= G. C. Foster =

Jamaican sportsman

Personal information
- Full name: Gerald Claude Eugene Foster
- Born: 30 November 1885; Spanish Town, Jamaica
- Died: 30 September 1966 (aged 80); Kingston, Jamaica

Domestic team information
- Years: Team
- 1909–1926: Jamaica

Career statistics
| Competition | FC |
|---|---|
| Matches | 9 |
| Runs scored | 321 |
| Batting average | 13.62 |
| 100s/50s | 0/1 |
| Top score | 61 |
| Balls bowled | 484 |
| Wickets | 8 |
| Bowling average | 37.00 |
| 5 wickets in innings | 0 |
| 10 wickets in match | 0 |
| Best bowling | 3/43 |
| Catches/stumpings | 4/- |
- Source: CricketArchive, 10 January 2013

Gerald Claude Eugene Foster (30 November 1885 – 25 February 1966), best known as G. C. Foster, was a Jamaican sportsman who excelled at sprinting, cricket, and tennis, and later became a well-known athletics coach and cricket umpire.

Born in Spanish Town, Foster was educated in Kingston, and participated in organised sport from an early age. Aged 19, he set a national record for the 100-yard dash, becoming recognised as one of Jamaica's top sprinters. Foster unsuccessfully attempted to participate at the 1908 Summer Olympics, and subsequently defeated several competitors at post-games meetings. On return to Jamaica, he concentrated more on cricket, playing irregularly at first-class level until the mid-1920s. Foster would go on to become one of Jamaica's foremost athletics coaches, helping to train athletes for both the Summer Olympics and Commonwealth Games. He died in 1966, with Jamaica's principal sporting college, the G. C. Foster College of Physical Education and Sport, later being named after him.

== Early life and athletics career ==
Born in Spanish Town, Saint Catherine Parish, Foster attended Wolmer's Boys' School in Kingston, where organised sport was an essential part of the school curriculum. He was very physically active from an early age, regularly hiking, cycling, and swimming across the Kingston Harbour. At the age of 14, Foster raced Kingston's leading sprinter, M. L. Ford, in the 100-yard dash, with a 10-yard handicap, and won by three yards. In 1904, at the age of 18, he was timed as having run the same race in 10 seconds, comparably favourably to the existing world record of 9.8 seconds. At Jamaica's first open track and field competition, held at the Kensington Cricket Club in 1906, Foster won both the 100-yard and 220-yard events, and went on to establish a Jamaican record in the 1908 championships. He later lowered his record time to 9.7 seconds, close to the then-world record of 9.6 seconds held by D. J. Kelly.

By the lead-up to the 1908 Summer Olympics, held in London, Foster was considered one of the top sprinters in the world, along with Reggie Walker, Robert Kerr, and James Rector. He booked passage to England on a banana boat, but on arrival was told that he could not compete in the games, as Jamaica was not affiliated to the International Olympic Committee (IOC). The Jamaica Olympic Association was not created until 1936. Despite being unable to participate, Foster remained in England during the Olympics, having been persuaded to stay by British athletics coach Harry Andrews. There were ten athletics meetings held in Britain and Ireland after the Olympics, most of them featuring Olympic competitors. Foster would defeat several of these leading sprinters, including John Morton, A. J. Northridge, and Patrick Roche, the Irish national champion.

== Cricket career and later life ==
On his return to Jamaica, Foster began to concentrate more on cricket, and made his first-class debut for the Jamaican representative side against the Gentlemen of Philadelphia, during the team's 1908–09 tour of the West Indies. In the match, played at Melbourne Park in February 1909, he scored 21 runs in his only innings, with the Philadelphians winning the match by eight wickets after a first-innings century by debutant Reggie Conyers. Foster's next matches for the national side did not come until the Marylebone Cricket Club (MCC) toured during the 1910–11 season. He played three against the MCC in March and April 1911, usually batting in the lower order and bowling second or third change. Foster was one of Jamaica's better players, averaging 27.20 from six innings and taking five wickets at an average of 19.40. Due to Jamaica's distance from the other British colonies in the West Indies, its cricket team did not compete in the Inter-Colonial Tournament (featuring Barbados, British Guiana, and Trinidad), and consequently rarely played at first-class level throughout the rest of the 1910s and the early 1920s. Foster was often unavailable for these matches, and did not play again until the 1924–25 season, when Barbados toured for three matches.

With almost 14 years having elapsed since he last played at first-class level, Foster scored 61 runs in his first innings after his return, putting on 108 runs for the fifth wicket with Frank Martin (195). He was less successful in the other matches against Barbados, but was still selected for Jamaica the following season in two matches against the touring MCC, having celebrated his 40th birthday in November 1925. He scored 29 not out and took 3/79 in his last first-class match. In later years, Foster became a noted athletics coach, accompanying the Jamaican team to its first international tournament, the 1934 British Empire Games (held in Hamilton, Canada). He was also involved in the Jamaican team at the 1948 Summer Olympics, the country's first Olympic team. As well as coaching, he umpired cricket and served as a schoolteacher. Foster died in Kingston in February 1966. In January 1978, the Government of Cuba announced a grant would be made to the Jamaican government, to be used for the construction of three separate education institutions. One of these, the G. C. Foster College of Physical Education and Sport, was named in honour of Foster, officially opening in Spanish Town in 1980. In November 2012, a bust of Foster was unveiled at the college's campus.
