= Mike Vehle =

American politician (born 1949)

Member of the South Dakota Senate from the 20th district
- Incumbent
- Assumed office January 2009
- Preceded by: Ed Olson

Member of the South Dakota House of Representatives from the 20th district
- In office January 2005 – January 2009 Serving with Lou Sebert (2005–2007); Lance Carson (2007–2009)
- Preceded by: Mel Olson
- Succeeded by: Noel Hamiel

Personal details
- Born: November 17, 1949 (age 76) Reliance, South Dakota, U.S.
- Party: Democratic (1969–2002) Republican (2002–present)
- Profession: Banker

Mike Vehle (born November 17, 1949) is an American politician and a Republican member of the South Dakota Senate representing District 20 since January 2009. Vehle served consecutively in the South Dakota Legislature from January 2005 until January 2009 in the South Dakota House of Representatives District 20 seat.

== Elections ==
- 2012 Begalka was challenged by his 2010 Independent opponent Steve Sibson in the June 5, 2012 Republican Primary but won with 1,812 votes (66.11%). Vehle won the November 6, 2012 General election with 5,734 votes (57.02%) against Democratic former Representative Quinten Burg.
- 2004 When House District 20 incumbent Democratic Representative Mel Olson left the Legislature and left a seat open, Vehle and incumbent Representative Lou Sebert were unopposed for the June 1, 2004 Republican Primary and won the four-way November 2, 2004 General election where Representative Sebert took the first seat and Vehle took the second seat with 4,646 votes (26.37%) ahead of Democratic nominees Gary Stadlman (who had run for the seat in 2000) and Kristin Wisnowski.
- 2006 When District 20 incumbent Republican Representative Sebert left the Legislature and left a District 20 seat open, Vehle and Lance Carson were unopposed for the June 6, 2006 Republican Primary and won the four-way November 7, 2006 General election where fellow Republican nominee Carson took the first seat and Vehle took the second seat with 4,442 votes (28.82%) ahead of Democratic nominees Susan Steele and David Mitchell.
- 2008 When District 20 incumbent Senator Ed Olson was term limited and left the seat open, Vehle was unopposed for the June 3, 2008 Republican Primary and won the November 4, 2008 General election with 6,320 votes (66.93%) against Democratic nominee Jack Mortenson.
- 2010 Vehle was unopposed for the June 8, 2010 Republican Primary and won the three-way November 2, 2010 General election with 4,827 votes (57.29%) against Democratic nominee Susan Thie and Independent candidate Steve Sibson.
