= Victor Henny =

Dutch sprinter (1887–1941)

Victor Henny (30 October 1887 in Salatiga, Dutch East Indies – 12 July 1941 in London, United Kingdom) was a Dutch athlete, who competed at the 1908 Summer Olympics in London.

Henny ran in the first heat of the 100 metres, placing third to Edward Duffy and Georgios Skoutarides and not advancing to the semifinals. In the 200 metres he again lost in the first round, placing second to John George with a time of 24.6 seconds to George's 23.4 seconds.

He also competed in the 400 metres, taking fourth and last in his preliminary heat to be eliminated in the first round again.

== Sources ==
- Cook, Theodore Andrea (1908). The Fourth Olympiad, Being the Official Report. London: British Olympic Association.
- De Wael, Herman (2001). "Athletics 1908". Herman's Full Olympians. Archived from the original on 27 September 2006.
- Wudarski, Pawel (1999). "Wyniki Igrzysk Olimpijskich" (in Polish).
