= Greece at the 1908 Summer Olympics =

- IOC code: GRE
- NOC: Committee of the Olympic Games

in London United Kingdom
- Competitors: 20
- Flag bearer: Nikolaos Georgantas
- Medals Ranked 15th: Gold 0 Silver 3 Bronze 1 Total 4

Summer Olympics appearances (overview)
- 1896; 1900; 1904; 1908; 1912; 1920; 1924; 1928; 1932; 1936; 1948; 1952; 1956; 1960; 1964; 1968; 1972; 1976; 1980; 1984; 1988; 1992; 1996; 2000; 2004; 2008; 2012; 2016; 2020; 2024; 2028

Other related appearances
- 1906 Intercalated Games

Greece competed at the 1908 Summer Olympics in London, England. Greek athletes have competed in every Summer Olympic Games.

== Medalists ==
Medal	Name	Sport	Event	Date
Silver	Konstantinos Tsiklitiras	Athletics	Men's standing high jump	August 23
Silver	Konstantinos Tsiklitiras	Athletics	Men's standing long jump	August 20
Silver	Michalis Dorizas	Athletics	Men's freestyle javelin	August 15
Bronze	Anastasios Metaxas^{[a]}	Shooting	Men's individual trap	July 11

== Results by event ==
=== Athletics ===
Greece's best results were a trio of silver medals, one by Konstantinos Tsiklitiras in each of the standing jumps and the third by Mikhail Dorizas in the freestyle javelin.

Event	Place	Athlete	Heats	Semifinals	Final
Men's 100 metres	Heats	Georgios Skoutarides	Unknown; 2nd, heat 1	Did not advance	
Men's 100 metres	Heats	Mikhail Paskalides	Unknown; 4th, heat 6	Did not advance	
Men's 200 metres	Heats	Mikhail Paskalides	Unknown; 2nd, heat 9	Did not advance	
Men's 1500 metres	Semi- finalist	Stefanos Demitrios	None held	Unknown; 4th, heat 4	Did not advance
Men's 110 metre hurdles	Heats	Georgios Skoutarides	Unknown; 2nd, heat 3	Did not advance	
Men's 5 miles	—	Georgios Koulouberdas	None held	Did not finish —, semifinal 2	Did not advance
Men's marathon	—	Georgios Koulouberdas	None held		Did not finish
Men's marathon	—	Anastasios Koutoulakis	None held		Did not finish

Event	Place	Athlete	Height/ Distance
Men's triple jump	10th	Dimitrios Muller	13.09 metres
Men's pole vault	6th	Georgios Banikas	3.50 metres
Men's pole vault	9th	Stefanos Kountouriotis	3.25 metres
Men's standing high jump	2nd	Konstantinos Tsiklitiras	1.55 metres
Men's standing long jump	2nd	Konstantinos Tsiklitiras	3.235 metres
Men's shot put	9-25	Mikhail Dorizas	Unknown
Men's shot put	9-25	Nikolaos Georgantas	Unknown
Men's discus throw	12-42	Mikhail Dorizas	Unknown
Men's discus throw	12-42	Nikolaos Georgantas	Unknown
Men's javelin throw	8-16	Kharalambos Zouras	Unknown
Men's Greek discus	5th	Mikhail Dorizas	33.34 metres
Men's Greek discus	6th	Nikolaos Georgantas	33.21 metres
Men's freestyle javelin	2nd	Mikhail Dorizas	51.36 metres
Men's freestyle javelin	4th	Kharalambos Zouras	48.61 metres
Men's freestyle javelin	10-33	Nikolaos Georgantas	Unknown

=== Cycling ===
Greece had one long-distance cyclist enter the cycling competitions in 1908. He did not finish either of his races.

Event	Place	Cyclist	Heats	Semifinals	Final
Men's 20 kilometres	—	Ioannis Santorinaios	None held	Did not finish —, semifinal 5	Did not advance
Men's 100 kilometres	—	Ioannis Santorinaios	None held	Did not finish —, semifinal 2	Did not advance

=== Shooting ===
Event	Place	Shooter	Score
Men's 1000 yard free rifle	45th	Alexandros Theofilakis	30
Men's team free rifle	9th	Ioannis Theofilakis; Matthias Triantafyllidis; Alexandros Theofilakis; Georgios Orphanidis; Defkalion Rediadis; Frangiskos Maurommatis	3789
Men's team military rifle	7th	Ioannis Theofilakis; Frangiskos Maurommatis; Alexandros Theofilakis; Georgios Orphanidis; Matthias Triantafilladis; Deukal. Rediadis	1999
Men's stationary target small-bore rifle	15th	Georgios Orphanidis	357
Men's individual pistol	25th	Frangiskos Maurommatis	419
Men's individual pistol	26th	Alexandros Theofilakis	409
Men's individual pistol	29th	Ioannis Theofilakis	406
Men's individual pistol	32nd	Deukal. Rediadis	397
Men's team pistol	7th	Frangiskos Maurommatis; Alexandros Theofilakis; Ioannis Theofilakis; Georgios Orphanidis	1576
Men's individual trap shooting	3rd	Anastasios Metaxas^{[a]}	57

^{a} Anastasios Metaxas (GRE) is generally credited with a bronze medal in men's individual trap shooting; no tie-breaker was held. The 1908 official report lists Metaxas as having tied with Alexander Maunder (GBR) and assigns bronze medals to each. However, Metaxas does not appear in the IOC medal database, which lists only Maunder as sole bronze medalist.

== Sources ==
- Cook, Theodore Andrea (1908). The Fourth Olympiad, Being the Official Report. London: British Olympic Association.
- De Wael, Herman (2001). "Top London 1908 Olympians". Herman's Full Olympians. Archived from the original on 12 July 2006.
