= Károly Radóczy =

Hungarian athlete

Károly Radóczy (30 August 1885 – 17 January 1962) was a Hungarian athlete. He competed at the 1908 Summer Olympics in London and at the 1912 Summer Olympics in Stockholm.

In 1908 in the 200 metres, Radóczy advanced to the semifinals after a walkover win in the preliminary heats. In Radóczy's first actual race he clocked in at 22.8 seconds, 0.2 seconds behind Robert Kerr and 0.1 seconds behind William Hamilton. His third-place finish in the heat did not qualify him to advance to the final. Four years later he was eliminated in the first round of the 800 metres competition.

== Sources ==
- Cook, Theodore Andrea (1908). The Fourth Olympiad, Being the Official Report. London: British Olympic Association.
- De Wael, Herman (2001). "Athletics 1908". Herman's Full Olympians. Archived from the original on 27 September 2006.
- Wudarski, Pawel (1999). "Wyniki Igrzysk Olimpijskich" (in Polish).
