= Sebert =

Sebert may refer to:

- Sæberht of Essex, (died c. 616), Anglo-Saxon King of Essex
- Günter Sebert (born 1948), German footballer
- Kesha Sebert (born 1987), American musician known mononymously as Kesha
- Lou Sebert (1935–2025), American politician
- Louis Sebert (sprinter) (1886–1942), Canadian athlete
- Louis Sebert (politician), Canadian politician
- Pebe Sebert (born 1956), American musician
