= Louis Sebert =

Louis Sebert may refer to:

- Lou Sebert (1935–2025), American politician
- Louis Sebert (sprinter) (1886–1942), Canadian athlete
- Louis Sebert (politician), Canadian politician
