= Athletics at the 1908 Summer Olympics – Men's 200 metres =

Men's 200 metres at the Games of the IV Olympiad
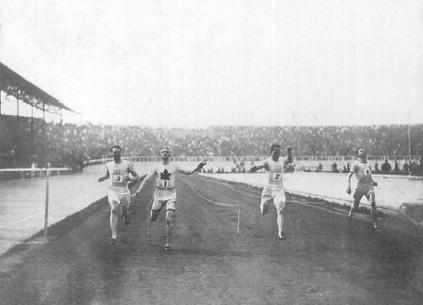
- Kerr winning the final
- Venue: White City Stadium
- Dates: 21 July 1908 (quarterfinals); 22 July 1908 (semifinals); 23 July 1908 (final)
- Competitors: 43 from 15 nations
- Winning time: 22.6

Medalists
1st place, gold medalist(s)		Robert Kerr; Canada
2nd place, silver medalist(s)		Robert Cloughen; United States
3rd place, bronze medalist(s)		Nathaniel Cartmell; United States

The men's 200 metre race was held for the third time at the 1908 Summer Olympics in London. The competition was held from 21 to 23 July 1908. NOCs could enter up to 12 athletes. 43 sprinters from 15 nations competed. The event was won by Robert Kerr of Canada, the first win by a nation other than the United States. Americans took silver (Robert Cloughen) and bronze (Nathaniel Cartmell), with Cartmell becoming the first person to win multiple 200 metres medals after taking earning silver in 1904.

== Background ==
This was the third appearance of the event, which was not held at the first Olympics in 1896 but has been on the program ever since. Two of the five runners from the 1904 Games returned: silver medalist Nathaniel Cartmell of the United States and fifth-place finisher Robert Kerr of Canada (the only man not to reach the four-man final in 1904). Kerr had won three Canadian titles and the 1908 AAA title since the previous Games.

Austria, Belgium, Finland, Great Britain, Greece, Italy, the Netherlands, South Africa, and Sweden each made their debut in the event. The United States made its third appearance, the only nation to have competed at each edition of the 200 metres to date.

== Competition format ==
There were three rounds: quarterfinals, semifinals, and a final. The quarterfinals consisted of 15 heats of between 1 and 5 athletes each; only the fastest man in each heat advanced to the semifinals. There were 4 semifinals, most with 4 runners but one with 3. Again, only the top athlete advanced. The final had 4 runners.

The race was run on a 1/3-mile track.

== Records ==
These were the standing world and Olympic records (in seconds) prior to the 1908 Summer Olympics.

World record	Jim Maybury (USA)^{*}	21.4	Chicago, United States	5 June 1897
Olympic record	Archie Hahn (USA)^{**}	21.6	St. Louis, United States	31 August 1904

^{*} unofficial 220 yards (= 201.17 m)

^{**} straight course

== Schedule ==
Date	Time	Round
Tuesday, 21 July 1908	11:00	Quarterfinals
Wednesday, 22 July 1908	10:15	Semifinals
Thursday, 23 July 1908	16:00	Final

== Results ==
=== Quarterfinals ===
The winner of each heat advanced, with all others eliminated. Heats were held on 21 July 1908.

==== Quarterfinal 1 ====
George led by ten yards when he crossed the finish line.

Rank	Athlete	Nation	Time	Notes
1	John George	Great Britain	23.4	Q
2	Victor Henny	Netherlands	24.6	

==== Quarterfinal 2 ====
In a tight race, Huff beat Duffy by less than two yards.

Rank	Athlete	Nation	Time	Notes
1	Harold Huff	United States	22.8	Q
2	Edward Duffy	South Africa	23.2	
3	Henk van der Wal	Netherlands	Unknown	
4	Knut Stenborg	Sweden	Unknown	

==== Quarterfinal 3 ====
Roche won by a mere yard.

Rank	Athlete	Nation	Time	Notes
1	Patrick Roche	Great Britain	22.8	Q
2	Lawson Robertson	United States	23.0	
3	Frank Lukeman	Canada	Unknown	
4	Evert Koops	Netherlands	Unknown	

==== Quarterfinal 4 ====
Cartmell won by about two yards.

Rank	Athlete	Nation	Time	Notes
1	Nathaniel Cartmell	United States	23.0	Q
2	Vilmos Rácz	Hungary	23.3	
3	Ragnar Stenberg	Finland	Unknown	

==== Quarterfinal 5 ====
Malfait had about a four-yard lead when he finished.

Rank	Athlete	Nation	Time	Notes
1	Georges Malfait	France	22.6	Q
2	Robert Duncan	Great Britain	23.1	

==== Quarterfinal 6 ====
Laaftman won by two yards.

Rank	Athlete	Nation	Time	Notes
1	Sven Låftman	Sweden	23.8	Q
2	Frigyes Wiesner	Hungary	24.0	
3	Ernst Greven	Netherlands	Unknown	

==== Quarterfinal 7 ====
There was no competition for Radóczy in the seventh heat.

Rank	Athlete	Nation	Time	Notes
1	Károly Radóczy	Hungary	walkover	Q

==== Quarterfinal 8 ====
Cloughen had a comfortable six-yard lead when he crossed the finish line.

Rank	Athlete	Nation	Time	Notes
1	Robert Cloughen	United States	23.4	Q
2	Umberto Barrozzi	Italy	24.1	

==== Quarterfinal 9 ====
Hurdsfield led by a yard and a half at the finish.

Rank	Athlete	Nation	Time	Notes
1	Samuel Hurdsfield	Great Britain	23.6	Q
2	Mikhail Paskalides	Greece	24.0	

==== Quarterfinal 10 ====
Hamilton's margin of victory was three yards.

Rank	Athlete	Nation	Time	Notes
1	William Hamilton	United States	22.4	Q
2	Louis Sebert	Canada	22.8	
3	Henry Pankhurst	Great Britain	Unknown	
4	Pál Simon	Hungary	Unknown	
5	Fernand Halbart	Belgium	Unknown	

==== Quarterfinal 11 ====
Kerr's victory was by about three yards.

Rank	Athlete	Nation	Time	Notes
1	Robert Kerr	Canada	22.2	Q
2	William W. May	United States	22.7	
3	James P. Stark	Great Britain	Unknown	
4	Knut Lindberg	Sweden	Unknown	
5	Emilio Brambilla	Italy	Unknown	

==== Quarterfinal 12 ====
Sherman led by two yards when he finished.

Rank	Athlete	Nation	Time	Notes
1	Nathaniel Sherman	United States	22.8	Q
2	John W. Morton	Great Britain	23.1	
3	Eduard Schönecker	Austria	Unknown	
4	Cornelis den Held	Netherlands	Unknown	

==== Quarterfinal 13 ====
Reed won by two and a half yards.

Rank	Athlete	Nation	Time	Notes
1	Lionel Reed	Great Britain	23.2	Q
2	Arthur Hoffmann	Germany	23.5	

==== Quarterfinal 14 ====
Guttormsen was the second runner to win without competition.

Rank	Athlete	Nation	Time	Notes
1	Oscar Guttormsen	Norway	walkover	Q

==== Quarterfinal 15 ====
The race was extremely tight until the final straightaway, where Hawkins pulled away to win.

Rank	Athlete	Nation	Time	Notes
1	George Hawkins	Great Britain	22.8	Q
2	Henri Meslot	France	23.2	
3	Jacobus Hoogveld	Netherlands	Unknown	

=== Semifinals ===
The semifinal round was held on 22 July 1908, a day after the heats. The winners of each semifinal advanced to the final, with the other runners being knocked out of competition.

==== Semifinal 1 ====
The first semifinal featured both of the runners who had won via walkover in the heats. There was very little room separating the lead three runners, with Kerr about nine inches in front of Hamilton and twelve ahead of Radoczy.

Rank	Athlete	Nation	Time	Notes
1	Robert Kerr	Canada	22.6	Q
2	William Hamilton	United States	22.7	
3	Károly Radóczy	Hungary	22.8	
4	Oscar Guttormsen	Norway	Unknown	

==== Semifinal 2 ====
This all-American heat was also close, but not as close as the first. Cartmell won by about five feet.

Rank	Athlete	Nation	Time	Notes
1	Nathaniel Cartmell	United States	22.6	Q
2	Nathaniel Sherman	United States	22.9	
3	Harold Huff	United States	23.0	

==== Semifinal 3 ====
Cloughen finally pulled ahead of Reed three-quarters of the way into the race, holding onto the lead until the finish.

Rank	Athlete	Nation	Time	Notes
1	Robert Cloughen	United States	22.6	Q
2	Lionel Reed	Great Britain	22.8	
3	John George	Great Britain	Unknown	
4	Samuel Hurdsfield	Great Britain	Unknown	

==== Semifinal 4 ====
Låftman was forced to scratch due to an injury. The three runners broke apart in the last ten metres, with Hawkins winning by a foot.

Rank	Athlete	Nation	Time	Notes
1	George Hawkins	Great Britain	22.6	Q
2	Patrick Roche	Great Britain	22.6	
3	Georges Malfait	France	Unknown	
—	Sven Låftman	Sweden	DNS	

=== Final ===
The final was held on 23 July 1908. The top three were within two feet of each other, as Kerr's early lead evaporated in the straight. He was able to hang onto nine inches, however, and defeated Cloughen by that small margin.

Rank	Athlete	Nation	Time
1st place, gold medalist(s)	Robert Kerr	Canada	22.6
2nd place, silver medalist(s)	Robert Cloughen	United States	22.6
3rd place, bronze medalist(s)	Nathaniel Cartmell	United States	22.7
4	George Hawkins	Great Britain	22.9

== Results summary ==
Rank	Athlete	Nation	Quarterfinals	Semifinals	Final	Notes
1st place, gold medalist(s)	Robert Kerr	Canada	22.2	22.6	22.6	
2nd place, silver medalist(s)	Robert Cloughen	United States	23.4	22.6	22.6	
3rd place, bronze medalist(s)	Nathaniel Cartmell	United States	23.0	22.6	22.7	
4	George Hawkins	Great Britain	22.8	22.6	22.9	
5	Patrick Roche	Great Britain	22.8	22.6	Did not advance	
6	William Hamilton	United States	22.4	22.7	Did not advance	
7	Lionel Reed	Great Britain	23.2	22.8	Did not advance	
7	Károly Radóczy	Hungary	Walkover	22.8	Did not advance	
9	Nathaniel Sherman	United States	22.8	22.9	Did not advance	
10	Harold Huff	United States	22.8	23.0	Did not advance	
11	Georges Malfait	France	22.6	Unknown	Did not advance	3rd in semifinal
11	John George	Great Britain	23.4	Unknown	Did not advance	3rd in semifinal
13	Samuel Hurdsfield	Great Britain	23.6	Unknown	Did not advance	4th in semifinal
13	Oscar Guttormsen	Norway	Walkover	Unknown	Did not advance	4th in semifinal
15	Sven Låftman	Sweden	23.8	DNS	Did not advance	
16	William W. May	United States	22.7	Did not advance		
17	Louis Sebert	Canada	22.8	Did not advance		
18	Lawson Robertson	United States	23.0	Did not advance		
19	Robert Duncan	Great Britain	23.1	Did not advance		
19	John W. Morton	Great Britain	23.1	Did not advance		
21	Edward Duffy	South Africa	23.2	Did not advance		
21	Henri Meslot	France	23.2	Did not advance		
23	Vilmos Rácz	Hungary	23.3	Did not advance		
24	Arthur Hoffmann	Germany	23.5	Did not advance		
25	Mikhail Paskalides	Greece	24.0	Did not advance		
25	Frigyes Wiesner	Hungary	24.0	Did not advance		
27	Umberto Barrozzi	Italy	24.1	Did not advance		
28	Victor Henny	Netherlands	24.6	Did not advance		
29	Ernst Greven	Netherlands	Unknown	Did not advance		3rd in quarterfinal
29	Jacobus Hoogveld	Netherlands	Unknown	Did not advance		3rd in quarterfinal
29	Frank Lukeman	Canada	Unknown	Did not advance		3rd in quarterfinal
29	Henry Pankhurst	Great Britain	Unknown	Did not advance		3rd in quarterfinal
29	Eduard Schönecker	Austria	Unknown	Did not advance		3rd in quarterfinal
29	James P. Stark	Great Britain	Unknown	Did not advance		3rd in quarterfinal
29	Ragnar Stenberg	Finland	Unknown	Did not advance		3rd in quarterfinal
29	Henk van der Wal	Netherlands	Unknown	Did not advance		3rd in quarterfinal
37	Cornelis den Held	Netherlands	Unknown	Did not advance		4th in quarterfinal
37	Evert Koops	Netherlands	Unknown	Did not advance		4th in quarterfinal
37	Knut Lindberg	Sweden	Unknown	Did not advance		4th in quarterfinal
37	Pál Simon	Hungary	Unknown	Did not advance		4th in quarterfinal
37	Knut Stenborg	Sweden	Unknown	Did not advance		4th in quarterfinal
42	Emilio Brambilla	Italy	Unknown	Did not advance		5th in quarterfinal
42	Fernand Halbart	Belgium	Unknown	Did not advance		5th in quarterfinal
