= Lance Carson =

American politician (1945–2020)

Member of the South Dakota House of Representatives from the 20th district
- In office January 9, 2007 – January 13, 2015 Serving with Mike Vehle (2007–2009); Noel Hamiel (2009–2011); Tona Rozum (2011–2015)
- Preceded by: Lou Sebert
- Succeeded by: Joshua Klumb
- In office January 10, 2017 – January 8, 2019 Serving with Tona Rozum
- Preceded by: Joshua Klumb
- Succeeded by: Paul Miskimins; Lance Koth

Personal details
- Born: December 3, 1945 Nunda, South Dakota, U.S.
- Died: October 14, 2020 (aged 74) Minneapolis, Minnesota, U.S.
- Party: Republican

Lance Allen Carson (December 3, 1945 – October 14, 2020) was an American politician. He was a Republican member of the South Dakota House of Representatives representing District 20 from 2007 to 2015 and 2017 to 2019.

== Biography ==
Carson was born in Nunda, South Dakota. He graduated from Rutland High School and Southern State Teachers College. He served in the United States Army during the Vietnam War. Carson owned a gas station and automobile repair shop in Brookings, South Dakota.

Carson and his wife moved to Mitchell, South Dakota, and operated Lance's Interstate Amoco for twenty-five years. After serving in the legislature Carson was elected to serve as the County Chair for the Davison County Republican Party. Prior to Carson's death he endorsed Barry Volk as his successor as State House Representative from District 20.

== Health and death ==
Carson had suffered from heart problems after having four heart attacks, including the first one at age 38. He wore a heart pump in his later years and undergone two bypass surgeries. Carson was hospitalized for a blood infection in 2012 which developed into leukemia. He died from COVID-19 in Minneapolis, on October 14, 2020, at age 74, during the COVID-19 pandemic in Minnesota.

== Elections ==
- 2012 Carson and incumbent Representative Tona Rozum were unopposed for the June 5, 2012 Republican Primary; and won the four-way November 6, 2012 General election where Carson took the first seat with 5,841 votes (32%) and Representative Rozum took the second seat against Democratic nominees James Schorzmann and Dave Mitchell, who had run for the seat in 2006 and 2008.
- 2006 When incumbent Republican Representative Lou Sebert was term limited and left the Legislature and left a District 20 seat open, Carson and incumbent Representative Mike Vehle were unopposed for the June 6, 2006 Republican Primary, and won the four-way November 7, 2006 General election, where Carson took the first seat with 4,530 votes (29.4%) and Representative Vehle took the second seat ahead of Democratic nominees Susan Steele and David Mitchell.
- 2008 With incumbent Republican Representative Vehle running for South Dakota Senate and leaving a District 20 seat open, Carson and Noel Hamiel were unopposed for the June 3, 2008 Republican Primary; in the four-way November 4, 2008 General election, Carson took the first seat with 5,599 votes (33.1%) and Hamiel took the second seat ahead of Democratic nominees Tony Sieler and returning 2006 opponent David Mitchell.
- 2010 With incumbent Republican Representative Hamiel leaving the Legislature leaving a District 20 seat open, Carson and Tona Rozum were unopposed for the June 8, 2010 Republican Primary; in the three-way November 2, 2010 General election Carson took the first seat with 5,363 votes (43.4%) and Rozum took the second seat ahead of Independent Becky Haslam.
