= Henk van der Wal =

Dutch athlete (1886–1982)

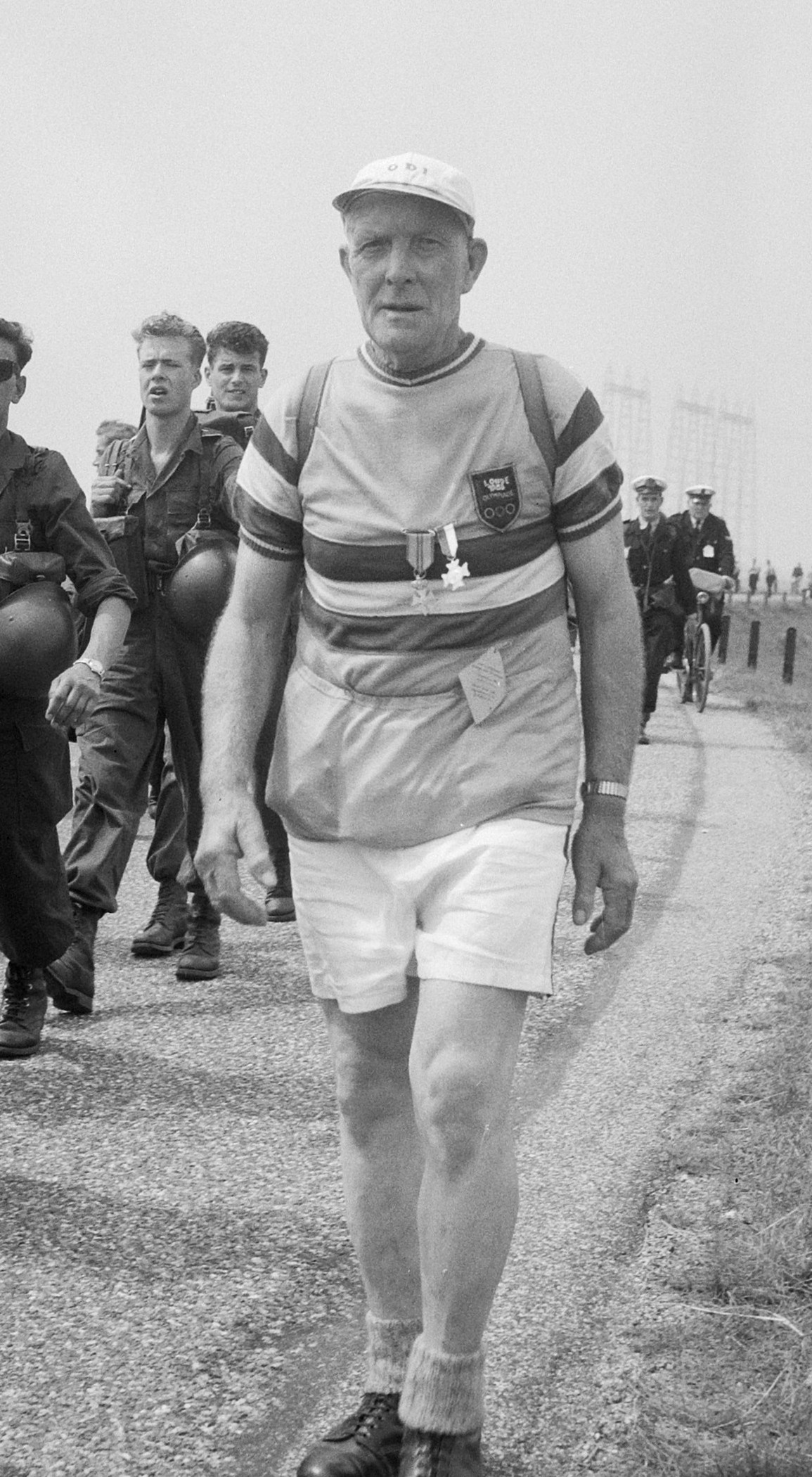
Henk van der Wal in 1961

Hendrik "Henk" Jacob van der Wal (20 August 1886 in Rotterdam – 4 August 1982 in Rotterdam) was a Dutch athlete. He competed at the 1908 Summer Olympics in London.

Van der Wal lost in the preliminary heats of the 200 metres, placing third to Harold Huff and Edward Duffy. In the 400 metres, van der Wal again was eliminated in the preliminary heats following his fourth-place finish in the four-man heat. He did not finish his semifinal heat of the 800 metres.

== Sources ==
- Evans, Hilary; Gjerde, Arild; Heijmans, Jeroen; Mallon, Bill; et al. "Henk van der Wal". Olympics at Sports-Reference.com. Sports Reference LLC. Archived from the original on 13 November 2013.
- Cook, Theodore Andrea (1908). The Fourth Olympiad, Being the Official Report. London: British Olympic Association.
- De Wael, Herman (2001). "Athletics 1908". Herman's Full Olympians. Archived from the original on 27 September 2006.
- Wudarski, Pawel (1999). "Wyniki Igrzysk Olimpijskich" (in Polish).
