= Athletics at the 1908 Summer Olympics – Men's 100 metres =

Men's 100 metres at the Games of the IV Olympiad
- Venue: White City Stadium
- Dates: July 20, 1908 (quarterfinals); July 21, 1908 (semifinals); July 22, 1908 (final)
- Competitors: 60 from 16 nations
- Winning time: 10.8

Medalists
1st place, gold medalist(s)		Reggie Walker	South Africa
2nd place, silver medalist(s)		James Rector	United States
3rd place, bronze medalist(s)		Robert Kerr	Canada

The men's 100 metres was the shortest of the sprint races at the 1908 Summer Olympics in London. The competition was held over the course of three days. The first round was held on 20 July, the semifinals on 21 July, and the final on 22 July. NOCs could enter up to 12 athletes, The event was won by Reggie Walker of South Africa, the first time the gold medal went to a nation other than the United States. The Americans did stay on the podium with James Rector's silver medal. Canada won its first medal in the event, a bronze by Robert Kerr.

== Background ==
This was the fourth time the event was held. Nathaniel Cartmell, the 1904 silver medalist, competed again in 1908, but gold medalist Archie Hahn did not. Other notable entrants included John W. Morton of Great Britain, the four-time AAA Championships winner; Reggie Walker, the 1907 South African champion; and Knut Lindberg of Sweden, the unofficial world record holder.

Austria, Belgium, Finland, the Netherlands, Norway, and South Africa were represented in the event for the first time. The United States and Hungary were the only two nations to have appeared at each of the first four Olympic men's 100 metres events.

== Competition format ==
With a larger field than in 1904, the event expanded from two rounds to three: heats, semifinals, and a final. Only the top runner in each heat, of which there were 17, advanced to the semifinals. These 17 semifinalists were divided into 4 semifinal heats; again, only the top runner advanced to the final.

== Records ==
These were the standing world and Olympic records (in seconds) prior to the 1908 Summer Olympics.

World record	10.6(*)	(Sweden) Knut Lindberg	Gothenburg (SWE)	August 26, 1906
Olympic Record	10.8	(United States) Frank Jarvis	Paris (FRA)	July 14, 1900
Olympic Record	10.8	(United States) Walter Tewksbury	Paris (FRA)	July 14, 1900

(*) unofficial

James Rector (in the 15th heat and the third semi-final) and Reggie Walker (in the first semi-final and final) both equalized the standing Olympic record. Reggie Walker's actual time in the first semi-final was 10.7, but was rounded up to the nearest fifth in accordance with rules in force at the time, so his time was given as 10 4/5.

== Results ==
=== Heats ===
Times were kept for the winning runner in each heat only. They were measured to the closest 1/5 second. The fastest runner advanced to the second round. The competition began at 3 p.m. on 20 July, the seventh day of the Games. A break was taken after the first nine heats to allow for four heats of the 800 metres to be run at 3:30 p.m., with the final eight heats of the 100 metres commencing at 4 p.m.

==== Heat 1 ====
Duffy won this heat by three yards.

Rank	Athlete	Nation	Time	Notes
1	Edward Duffy	South Africa	11.6	Q
2	Georgios Skoutarides	Greece	(11.9)	
3	Victor Henny	Netherlands	Unknown	

==== Heat 2 ====
George was ahead of Guttormsen by three yards when he finished.

Rank	Athlete	Nation	Time	Notes
1	John George	Great Britain	11.6	Q
2	Oscar Guttormsen	Norway	(12.0)	

==== Heat 3 ====
Cartmell crossed the finish line two yards ahead of Malfait.

Rank	Athlete	Nation	Time	Notes
1	Nate Cartmell	United States	11.0	Q
2	Georges Malfait	France	(11.2)	
3	Arthur Hoffmann	Germany	(11.4)	
4	Evert Koops	Netherlands	Unknown	

==== Heat 4 ====
Walker was four yards ahead of the field when he finished. Records do not indicate which of the final two runners took which place.

Rank	Athlete	Nation	Time	Notes
1	Reggie Walker	South Africa	11.0	Q
2	Jean Konings	Belgium	(11.6)	
3	Denis Murray	Great Britain	Unknown	
4–5	Edgar Kiralfy	United States	Unknown	
4–5	Ernestus Greven	Netherlands	Unknown	

==== Heat 5 ====
Harmer pulled up lame. Cloughen won by five yards.

Rank	Athlete	Nation	Time	Notes
1	Robert Cloughen	United States	11.0	Q
2	John Johansen	Norway	(11.7)	
3	David Beland	Canada	Unknown	
—	Henry Harmer	Great Britain	DNF	

==== Heat 6 ====
May won by about three yards.

Rank	Athlete	Nation	Time	Notes
1	William W. May	United States	11.2	Q
2	Victor Jacquemin	Belgium	(11.5)	
3	Louis Lesca (or Lescat)	France	Unknown	
4	Mikhail Paskalides	Greece	Unknown	

==== Heat 7 ====
Duncan won by a yard.

Rank	Athlete	Nation	Time	Notes
1	Robert Duncan	Great Britain	11.4	Q
2	Knut Stenborg	Sweden	(11.5)	
3	Hans Eicke	Germany	(11.6)	
4	Umberto Barrozzi	Italy	Unknown	
5	Ragnar Stenberg	Finland	Unknown	

==== Heat 8 ====
Stevens beat world record holder Lindberg by inches.

Rank	Athlete	Nation	Time	Notes
1	Lester Stevens	United States	11.2	Q
2	Knut Lindberg	Sweden	(11.2)	
3	Heinrich Rehder	Germany	(11.8)	
4	William Murray	Great Britain	Unknown	

==== Heat 9 ====
Morton won by about three yards.

Rank	Athlete	Nation	Time	Notes
1	John W. Morton	Great Britain	11.2	Q
2	Axel Petersen	Denmark	(11.5)	
3	Jacobus Hoogveld	Netherlands	Unknown	

==== Heat 10 ====
Fischer pulled up lame, leaving Kerr to defeat Chapman by three yards.

Rank	Athlete	Nation	Time	Notes
1	Robert Kerr	Canada	11.0	Q
2	Meyrick Chapman	Great Britain	(11.3)	
—	Paul Fischer	Germany	DNF	

==== Heat 11 ====
Phillips pulled up lame, allowing Hamilton to win by about three yards.

Rank	Athlete	Nation	Time	Notes
1	William Hamilton	United States	11.2	Q
2	Pál Simon	Hungary	(11.5)	
3	G. Lamotte	France	Unknown	
—	Herbert Phillips	South Africa	DNF	

==== Heat 12 ====
Huff was only about a yard ahead of Pankhurst when he finished.

Rank	Athlete	Nation	Time	Notes
1	Harold Huff	United States	11.4	Q
2	Henry Pankhurst	Great Britain	(11.5)	
3	Karl Fryksdal	Sweden	Unknown	

==== Heat 13 ====
Robertson won by about three yards.

Rank	Athlete	Nation	Time	Notes
1	Lawson Robertson	United States	11.4	Q
2	Frank Lukeman	Canada	(11.7)	
3	Henri Meslot	France	Unknown	
4	Eduard Schönecker	Austria	Unknown	

==== Heat 14 ====
Sherman's lead of four yards at the finish was one of the larger leads in the first round.

Rank	Athlete	Nation	Time	Notes
1	Nathaniel Sherman	United States	11.2	Q
2	Louis Sebert	Canada	(11.7)	
3	Harold Watson	Great Britain	Unknown	
4	Frigyes Wiesner	Hungary	Unknown	
5	Hermann von Bönninghausen	Germany	(12.0)	

==== Heat 15 ====
Rector's Olympic record-tying time gave him a relatively easy victory in the first round.

Rank	Athlete	Nation	Time	Notes
1	James Rector	United States	10.8	Q, =OR
2	Vilmos Rácz	Hungary	(11.4)	
3	Willy Kohlmey	Germany	(12.0)	

==== Heat 16 ====
In one of the slowest of the first round heads, Stark won by about two yards.

Rank	Athlete	Nation	Time	Notes
1	James P. Stark	Great Britain	11.8	Q
2	Gaspare Torretta	Italy	(12.0)	

==== Heat 17 ====
Roche won by about two yards.

Rank	Athlete	Nation	Time	Notes
1	Patrick Roche	Great Britain	11.4	Q
2	Carl Bechler	Germany	(11.4)	

=== Semifinals ===
The fastest runner in each semifinal advanced to the final. The semifinals were begun at 3:35 p.m. on 21 July.

==== Semifinal 1 ====
Cloughen withdrew to prepare for the 200m heats. Walker took the lead after about 50 metres and crossed the line about a yard in front of May to become the second sprinter to tie the Olympic record at the London Games. His actual time was 10.7, rounded up to the nearest fifth, in accordance with rules in force at the time; therefore, his time was given as 10 4/5.

Rank	Athlete	Nation	Time	Notes
1	Reggie Walker	South Africa	10.8	Q, =OR
2	William W. May	United States	(11.0)	
3	Patrick Roche	Great Britain	Unknown	
4	Lester Stevens	United States	Unknown	
—	Robert Cloughen	United States	DNS	

==== Semifinal 2 ====
Hamilton withdrew to prepare for the 200m heats. Kerr had little difficulty winning this heat, leading by three yards at the finish.

Rank	Athlete	Nation	Time	Notes
1	Robert Kerr	Canada	11.0	Q
2	Nathaniel Sherman	United States	(11.3)	
3	John W. Morton	Great Britain	Unknown	
—	William Hamilton	United States	DNS	

==== Semifinal 3 ====
Rector again won easily, tying the Olympic record for the second time.

Rank	Athlete	Nation	Time	Notes
1	James Rector	United States	10.8	Q, =OR
2	Harold Huff	United States	(11.1)	
3	Edward Duffy	South Africa	Unknown	
4	Robert Duncan	Great Britain	Unknown	

==== Semifinal 4 ====
Cartmell and Robertson ran a tight race, with Cartmell winning by about a foot.

Rank	Athlete	Nation	Time	Notes
1	Nate Cartmell	United States	11.2	Q
2	Lawson Robertson	United States	(11.2)	
3	James P. Stark	Great Britain	Unknown	
4	John George	Great Britain	Unknown	

=== Final ===
The Final of the 100 metres began at 4:15 p.m. on 22 July.

With Walker and Rector having already equalled the Olympic record before the final, it was widely expected that the final race of the 100 metres would be an exciting match between those two runners.

Walker got off to a quick lead, but Rector caught him about midway through the race and passed him. Walker responded with a great effort, pulling level with Rector, and the two ran side-by-side before Walker finally pulled ahead to win by half a yard.

Rector finished six inches ahead of Kerr, who finished two yards ahead of Cartmell for third place.

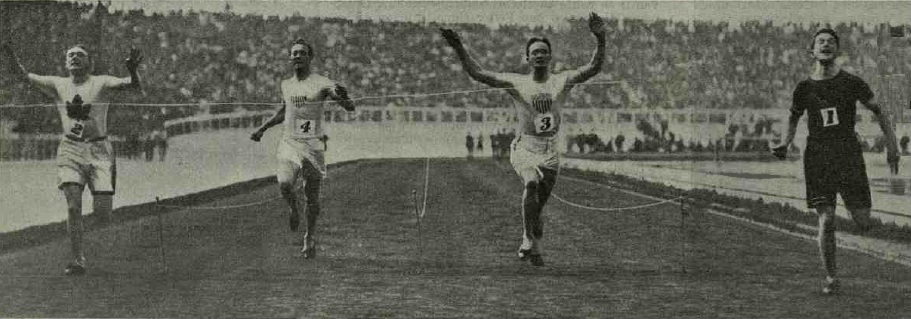
London 1908 Olympics-Walker wins 100 metres

Rank	Athlete	Nation	Time	Notes
1st place, gold medalist(s)	Reggie Walker	South Africa	10.8	=OR
2nd place, silver medalist(s)	James Rector	United States	(10.9)	
3rd place, bronze medalist(s)	Robert Kerr	Canada	(11.0)	
4	Nate Cartmell	United States	(11.2)	
