= Lionel Cornish =

British athlete

Personal information
- Nationality: British (English)
- Born: 25 December 1879 Hackney, London, England
- Died: 18 April 1939 (aged 59) Weybridge, Surrey, England

Sport
- Sport: Athletics
- Event: long jump
- Club: University of Oxford AC; Achilles Club

Lionel John Cornish (25 December 1879 – 18 April 1939) was a British track and field athlete, who competed at the 1908 Summer Olympics.

== Biography ==
Cornish born in Hackney, London, was educated at Merchant Taylors' School and Lincoln College in the University of Oxford.

In 1898 and while still at school, Cornish set 100 yards and 400 yards records at the L.A.C. Schools' Meeting. In 1900, as a Lincoln College student, he won his Oxford blue, winning the Oxbridge Sports long jump title the same year. He was also an accomplished runner and won the 440 yards and competed in the 100 yards at the varsity match in 1901.

Cornish finished second behind Irishman Peter O'Connor in the long jump event at the 1902 AAA Championships and repeated the feat three years later at the 1905 AAA Championships, where he was beaten by O'Connor again. In 1905 he set his personal best of 7.10.

After a third place finish at the 1906 AAA Championships, the AAA title eluded Cornish again when he finished runner-up to another Irishman Denis Murray.

Cornish represented the Great Britain team at the 1908 Olympic Games in London, and failed to advance to the finals of the men's long jump competition and the standing long jump event.

Cornish had been called to the Bar back in 1904 and would later forge a career in banking.
