= Stenberg =

Stenberg is a surname that was the 11,945th most common last name in the United States as of the 2000 census. One origin nationality for the surname is Swedish, though it was not uncommon for Swedish immigrants to the United States to change this surname to Stoneberg. According to the "Dictionary of American Family Names", this is a Swedish ornamental surname meaning "stone mountain" (or "stone hill" in Danish or Norwegian).

== People with the surname ==
- Amandla Stenberg (b. 1998), American actress
- Birgitta Stenberg (1932–2014), Swedish author, translator and illustrator
- Daniel Stenberg (b. 1970), Swedish Software Developer
- Dick Stenberg (1921–2004), Swedish Air Force lieutenant general
- Don Stenberg (b. 1948), American politician
- Eira Stenberg (b. 1943), Finnish playwright and poet
- Elli Stenberg (1903–1987), Finnish politician
- Gaby Stenberg (1923–2011), Swedish actress
- Georgii Stenberg (1900–1933), Russian artist and designer
- Hans Stenberg (b. 1953), Swedish politician
- Henry Wuorila-Stenberg (b. 1949), Finnish expressionist and surrealist artist
- Ivar Stenberg (b. 2007), Swedish ice hockey player
- Jan Stenberg (1938–2015), Swedish businessman
- Jeremy Stenberg (b. 1981), American motocross rider
- Johnny Stenberg (1925–1990), Norwegian politician
- Karin Stenberg (1884–1969), Swedish Sami activist and teacher
- Kurt Stenberg (1888–1936), Finnish gymnast
- Leif Stenberg (b. 1969), Swedish Muslim scholar
- Lennart Stenberg, Swedish author of Den nya nordiska floran
- Lisette Stenberg (1770–1847), Swedish actress and musician
- Logan Stenberg (b. 1997), American football player
- Otto Stenberg (b. 2005), Swedish ice hockey player
- Ragnar Stenberg (1887–1954), Finnish athlete
- Richard R. Stenberg (b. c. 1910), American historian
- Sirið Stenberg (b. 1968), Faroese politician
- Trine Stenberg (b. 1969), former Norwegian footballer
- Ulf Stenberg (born 1979), Swedish actor and theater director
- Ulla Stenberg (1792–1858), Swedish damask maker
- Vladimir Stenberg (1899–1982), Soviet artist and designer

== People with the surname Lillo-Stenberg ==
- Lars Lillo-Stenberg (b. 1962), Norwegian musician
- Per Lillo-Stenberg (1928–2014), Norwegian actor

== See also ==
- Stenberg v. Carhart, a Supreme Court case that ruled laws against partial birth abortions to be illegal
- Stenborg
