= James P. Stark =

British athlete

Jimmy Stark
Personal information
- Born: 7 March 1885 Glasgow, Scotland
- Died: 16 June 1929 (aged 44) Glasgow, Scotland

Sport
- Sport: Athletics
- Event: Sprints
- Club: University of Glasgow

James Primrose Stark (7 March 1885 – 16 June 1929) was a British & Scottish athlete who competed at the 1908 Summer Olympics in London.

== Biography ==
Stark was born in Glasgow and was a three times champion of Scotland over 100 yards and one time over 220 yards. He won two medals at the AAA Championships. He finished second behind John Morton in the 100 yards event and third in the 220 yards event behind Henry Hyman at the 1905 AAA Championships.

At the Olympic Games in 1908, represented Great Britain at the 1908 Summer Olympics and competed in the 100 metres; Stark won his first round heat with a time of 11.8 seconds to advance to the semifinals. He took third place in his race and was eliminated from further competition. He took third place in his preliminary heat of the 200 metres, not advancing to the semifinals.

He later worked for as a solicitor in Glasgow.

== Sources ==
- Cook, Theodore Andrea (1908). The Fourth Olympiad, Being the Official Report. London: British Olympic Association.
- De Wael, Herman (2001). "Athletics 1908". Herman's Full Olympians. Archived from the original on 27 September 2006.
- Wudarski, Pawel (1999). "Wyniki Igrzysk Olimpijskich" (in Polish). Archived from the original on 14 October 2008.
