= Jean Konings =

Belgian sprinter

Jean Konings (4 March 1886 – 29 May 1974) was a Belgian athlete who competed at the 1908 Summer Olympics in London. In the 100 metres event, Konings placed second in his first-round heat with a time of 11.6 seconds. His loss to Reggie Walker, who had run the race in 11.0 seconds, resulted in Konings' elimination from the competition.

== Sources ==
- www.sports-reference.com Jean Konings' profile
- Cook, Theodore Andrea (1908). The Fourth Olympiad, Being the Official Report. London: British Olympic Association.
- De Wael, Herman (2001). "Athletics 1908". Herman's Full Olympians. Archived from the original on 27 September 2006.
- Wudarski, Pawel (1999). "Wyniki Igrzysk Olimpijskich" (in Polish). Archived from the original on 16 February 2009.
