= Lionel Reed =

British athlete

Personal information
- Born: 31 December 1883 Kensington, London, England
- Died: 11 February 1957 (aged 73) Hastings, England

Sport
- Sport: Athletics
- Event: Sprints
- Club: London Athletic Club

Lionel James de Burgh Reed (31 December 1883 – 11 February 1957) was a British athlete. He competed at the 1908 Summer Olympics in London.

== Biography ==
Born in Kensington, London, Reed finished second behind Canadian Robert Kerr in the 220 yards at the 1908 AAA Championships.

At the 1908 Olympic Games, he competed in the 200 metres, Reed won his preliminary heat with a time of 23.2 seconds. He dropped his time to 22.8 seconds in the semifinal, but that wasn't enough to beat Robert Cloughen's 22.6 seconds and Reed was eliminated without advancing to the final.

In 1910 he became the National 440 yards champion after winning the AAA Championships title.

== Sources ==
- Cook, Theodore Andrea (1908). The Fourth Olympiad, Being the Official Report. London: British Olympic Association.
- De Wael, Herman (2001). "Athletics 1908". Herman's Full Olympians. Archived from the original on 27 September 2006.
- Wudarski, Pawel (1999). "Wyniki Igrzysk Olimpijskich" (in Polish).
