= Harold Watson (athlete) =

British sprinter

Harry Watson
Personal information
- Born: 1883
- Died: 15 February 1963 (aged 79–80) Sutton, London, England

Sport
- Sport: Athletics
- Event: Sprints
- Club: South London Harriers; London Athletic Club

Harold Watson (1883 – 15 February 1963) was a British athlete who competed at the 1908 Summer Olympics in London.

== Biography ==
Watson finished third behind John Morton in the 100 yards event at the 1905 AAA Championships.

Watson joined South London Harriers from L.A.C. in 1905, winning their 100 metres discipline at the Harriers' Autumn meeting at Kennington Oval.

At the 1908 Olympic Games in London, he represented Great Britain at the 1908 Summer Olympics and competed in the 100 metres, Watson took third place in his first round heat and did not advance to the semifinals.

He died in Sutton, London.

== Sources ==
- profile
- Cook, Theodore Andrea (1908). The Fourth Olympiad, Being the Official Report. London: British Olympic Association.
- De Wael, Herman (2001). "Athletics 1908". Herman's Full Olympians. Archived from the original on 27 September 2006.
- Wudarski, Pawel (1999). "Wyniki Igrzysk Olimpijskich" (in Polish). Archived from the original on 16 February 2009.
