= Karl Bechler =

German athletics competitor

Karl Bechler (14 February 1886 – 29 March 1945) was a German athlete, born in Danzig. He competed at the 1908 Summer Olympics in London. In the 100 metres, Bechler finished second in his first round heat with a time of 11.4 seconds, just behind winner Patrick Roche. The loss meant Bechler did not advance to the semifinals. He also participated in the javelin throw competition, but his result is unknown.

A veteran of World War I, in which he was awarded the Iron Cross, he died from shrapnel wounds in the last days of World War II in the cellar of his house in Danzig.

== Sources ==
- Cook, Theodore Andrea (1908). The Fourth Olympiad, Being the Official Report. London: British Olympic Association.
- De Wael, Herman (2001). "Athletics 1908". Herman's Full Olympians. Archived from the original on 27 September 2006.
- Wudarski, Pawel (1999). "Wyniki Igrzysk Olimpijskich" (in Polish). Archived from the original on 16 February 2009.
- Carl Bechler at World Athletics
- Carl Bechler at Olympedia
