= 1905 AAA Championships =

Outdoor track and field competition

- Dates: 1 July 1905
- Host city: London, England
- Venue: Stamford Bridge (stadium)
- Level: Senior
- Type: Outdoor
- Events: 16

The 1905 AAA Championships was the 1905 edition of the annual outdoor track and field competition organised by the Amateur Athletic Association (AAA). It was held on Saturday 1 July 1905 at the Stamford Bridge (stadium) in London, England, in front of 7–8,000 spectators.

The Championships consisted of 16 events.

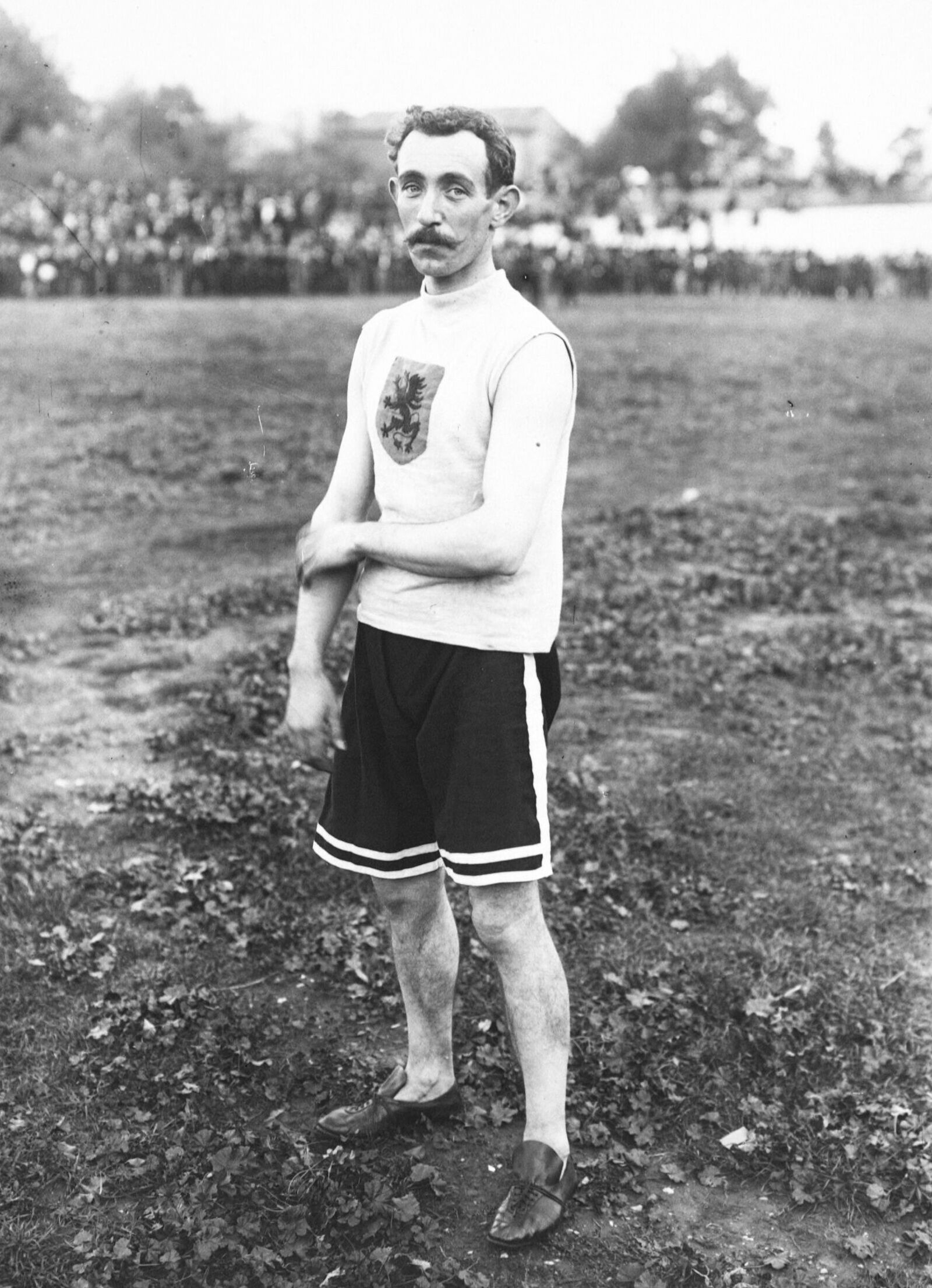
Frenchman Gonder won the pole jump event

== Results ==
Event	Gold		Silver		Bronze	
100 yards	John Morton	10.2	(Scotland) James Stark	2½ yd	Harold Watson	½ yd
220 yards	(United States) Henry Hyman	22.4	Claude Jupp	6 yd	(Scotland) James Stark	2 yd
440 yards	(Scotland) Wyndham Halswelle	50.8	(France) Georges Malfait	1½-5 yd	Edwin Montague	3 yd
880 yards	(Scotland) Bernard Blunden	2:02.0	Reginald Crabbe	2 yd	David Cowan	5 yd
1 mile	George Butterfield	4:25.2	(Scotland) John McGough	2-6 yd	E. Gardner	1 yd
4 miles	Josh Smith	21:08.8	(Scotland) Douglas McNicol	21:34.6	H. Hobbs	21:43.0
10 miles	Albert Aldridge	51:49.0	E. Gardner	53:12.2	Joe Deakin	53:44.2
steeplechase	Arthur Russell	11:11.0	Albert Aldridge	10 yd	only 2 finished	
120yd hurdles	(Scotland) Robert Stronach	16.8	(Wales) Wallis Walters	3 yd	(United States) Edward Amsler	
2 miles walk	George Larner	13:50.0	Robert Wilkinson	140 yd	W. H. Martindale	100 yd
7 miles walk	George Larner	52:34.0	Frederick Thompson	54:29.0	W. H. Martindale	54:47.0
high jump	(Leinster) Con Leahy	1.784	Edward Leader	1.733	only 2 competed	
pole jump	(France) Fernand Gonder	3.10	not awarded		only 1 competitor	
long jump	(Leinster) Peter O'Connor	7.25	Lionel Cornish	7.10	(Sweden) Hjalmar Mellander	6.60
shot put	(Leinster) Denis Horgan	13.55	(Scotland) Tom Nicolson	12.43	(Leinster) Michael Collins	11.35
hammer throw	(Scotland) Tom Nicolson	47.51	(Leinster) Denis Horgan	40.24	Alf Flaxman	35.46
