= Gerald Foster =

Gerald Foster may refer to:

- G. C. Foster (1885–1966), Jamaican sportsman
- Gerald Foster (painter) (1900–1987), American painter
