= Nathaniel Sherman =

American sprinter

Nathaniel Alden Sherman (February 7, 1888 – August 4, 1954) was an American athlete. He competed at the 1908 Summer Olympics in London. He was born in Boston, Massachusetts.

In the 100 meters, Sherman won his first round heat with a time of 11.2 seconds to advance to the semifinals. He lost his semifinal, taking second place with a time of 11.3 seconds to Robert Kerr's 11.0 seconds; this eliminated Sherman from the final.

Sherman also won his preliminary heat of the 200 meters with a time of 22.8 seconds. He again took second in the semifinals, losing to countryman Nate Cartmell with a time of 22.9 seconds to Cartmell's 22.6 seconds.

He attended Dartmouth College.

== Sources ==
- Cook, Theodore Andrea (1908). The Fourth Olympiad, Being the Official Report. London: British Olympic Association.
- De Wael, Herman (2001). "Athletics 1908". Herman's Full Olympians. Archived from the original on 27 September 2006.
- Wudarski, Pawel (1999). "Wyniki Igrzysk Olimpijskich" (in Polish).
