= Oscar Guttormsen =

Norwegian athlete (1884–1964)

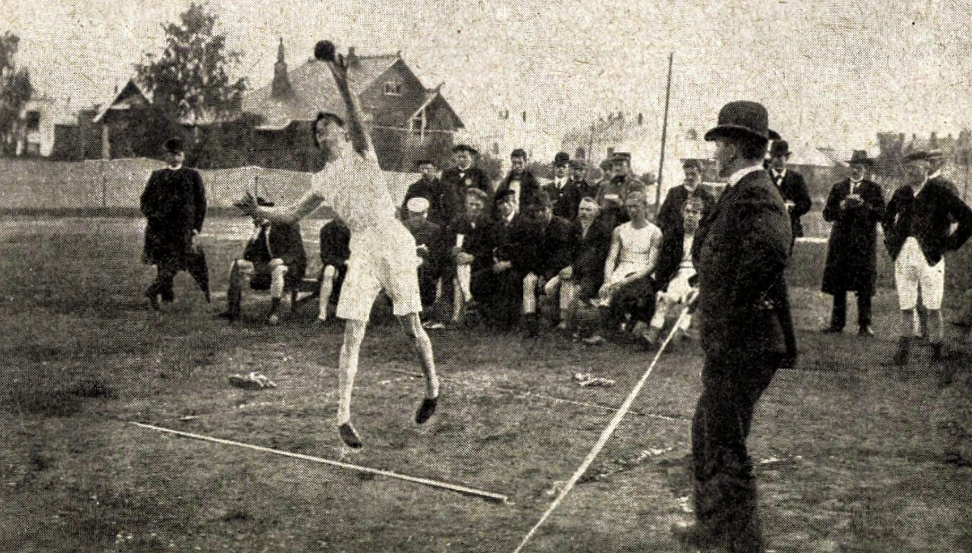
Oscar putting a shot on 1 September 1906, at the Old Frogner stadium in Oslo. He won the King's Cup this weekend as well.

Oscar Guttormsen (27 March 1884 – 15 January 1964) was a Norwegian athlete who specialized in sprints, jumps, and hurdles. He represented the sports club Ørnulf IF in Oslo.

He finished fourth in the triple jump at the 1906 Summer Olympics. At the 1908 Summer Olympics, he participated in several events, in addition to the triple jump where he finished fourteenth. Guttormsen ran in the second heat of the 100 metres, taking second place to John George to be eliminated. His time was 12.0 seconds. He advanced to the semifinals of the 200 metres after a walkover win in the preliminary heats. He placed fourth and last in his semifinal heat to not advance to the final. Finally, Guttormsen lost to George Nicol in the preliminary round of the 400 metres, not advancing to the semifinals. He was also eliminated in the heats of the 110 metres hurdles.

He became Norwegian champion in triple jump in 1905, 1907 and 1909, in the 100 metres in 1907 and 1908, in the 110 metres hurdles in the years 1906-1909, in the 400 metres in 1907 and 1908 long jump in 1907 and 1909, high jump in 1905, pole vault in 1907, pole jump in 1906 and shot put in 1908, but never became a medalist in the Olympic games.

== Sources ==
- Cook, Theodore Andrea (1908). The Fourth Olympiad, Being the Official Report. London: British Olympic Association.
- De Wael, Herman (2001). "Athletics 1908". Herman's Full Olympians. Archived from the original on 27 September 2006.
- Wudarski, Pawel (1999). "Wyniki Igrzysk Olimpijskich" (in Polish).
