= William W. May =

American athlete (1887–1979)

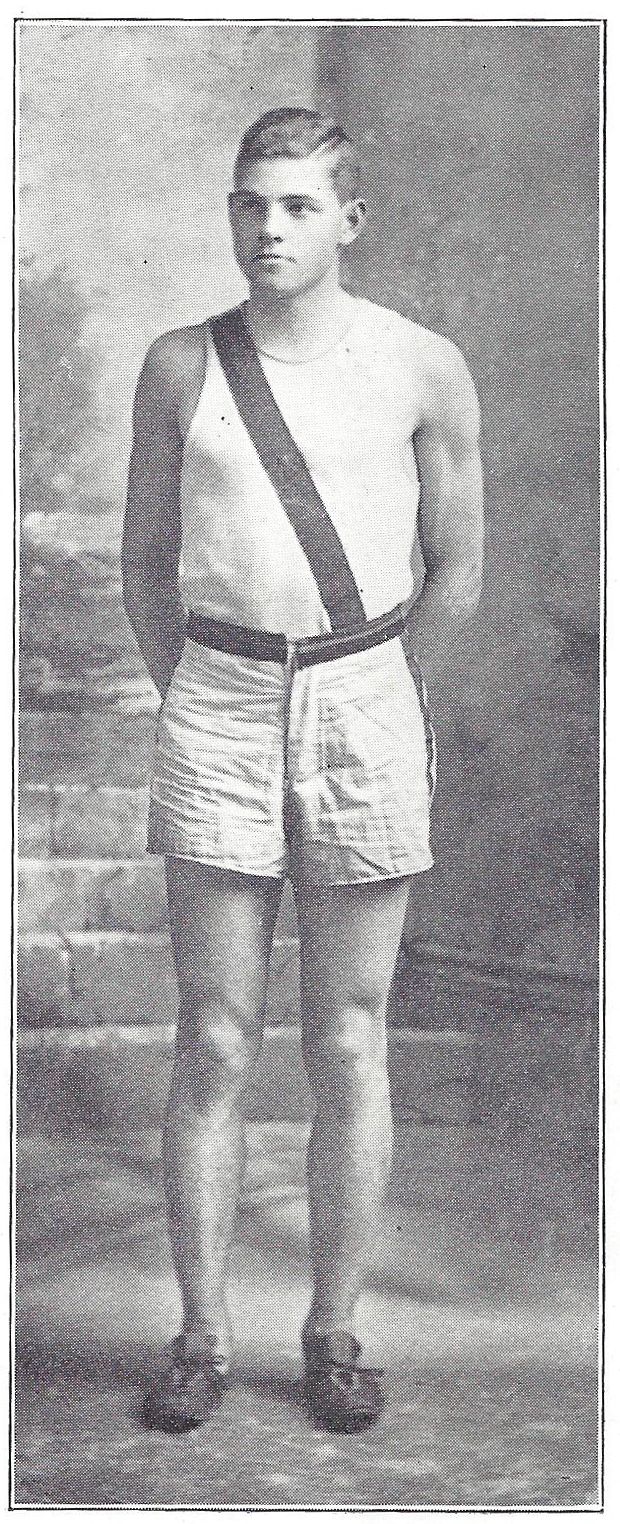
William W. May - America Olympic Athlete - 1905 Rochelle Township High School Graduate

William Wyman May (March 17, 1887 – November 1979) was an American athlete who competed at the 1908 Summer Olympics in London. He was born in Knoxville, Alabama and died in Utica, New York. He graduated from Rochelle Township High School in Rochelle, Illinois in 1905 and won the State Championship in the 50 yard dash.

In the 100 metres event, May won his first round heat with a time of 11.2 seconds. He was eliminated in the semifinals, running the course in 11.0 seconds but taking second place in his heat to Reggie Walker, who tied the Olympic record at 10.8 seconds. He lost to Robert Kerr in the preliminary heats of the 200 metres competition. May was eliminated while Kerr went on to win the gold medal in the event.

== Sources ==
- William W. May's profile at Sports Reference.com
- Cook, Theodore Andrea (1908). The Fourth Olympiad, Being the Official Report. London: British Olympic Association.
- De Wael, Herman (2001). "Athletics 1908". Herman's Full Olympians. Archived from the original on 27 September 2006.
- Wudarski, Pawel (1999). "Wyniki Igrzysk Olimpijskich" (in Polish).
