= Stenborg =

Stenborg is a surname. Notable people with the surname include:

- Åke Stenborg (1926–2010), Swedish chess player
- Carl Stenborg (1752–1813), Swedish singer
- Gray Stenborg (1921–1943), New Zealand flying ace
- Gustava Johanna Stenborg (1776–1819), Swedish artist
- Helen Stenborg (born 1925), American stage actress
- Knut Stenborg (1890–1946), Swedish athlete
- Petter Stenborg (1719–1781), Swedish actor

== See also ==
- Stenberg
