= Henry Pankhurst =

British sprinter (1884–1921)

Personal information
- Born: 1884 Newcastle-under-Lyme, England
- Died: 9 May 1921 (aged 36–37) Newcastle-under-Lyme, England

Sport
- Sport: Athletics
- Event: Sprints
- Club: Salford Harriers

Henry John Pankhurst (1884 – 9 May 1921) was a British track and field athlete who competed in sprinting events. He competed at the 1908 Summer Olympics.

== Biography ==
Pankhurst finished second behind Claude Jupp in the 220 yards event at the 1906 AAA Championships.

Pankhurst represented Great Britain at the 1908 Summer Olympics in London, in the 100 metres event and the 200 metres event. Pankhurst took second place in his first round heat with a time of 11.5 seconds, just behind Harold Huff, who won with 11.4 seconds. Pankhurst did not advance to the semifinals. In the 200 event, Pankhurst did not advance to the semifinals in the 200 metres, placing third in his preliminary heat.

Pankhurst was the Northern champion over 100 yards in 1908 and 1909 and 220 yards in 1908 and 1910.

== Sources ==
- Cook, Theodore Andrea (1908). The Fourth Olympiad, Being the Official Report. London: British Olympic Association.
- De Wael, Herman (2001). "Athletics 1908". Herman's Full Olympians. Archived from the original on 27 September 2006.
- Wudarski, Pawel (1999). "Wyniki Igrzysk Olimpijskich" (in Polish).
- Evans, Hilary; Gjerde, Arild; Heijmans, Jeroen; Mallon, Bill; et al. "Henry Pankhurst". Olympics at Sports-Reference.com. Sports Reference LLC. Archived from the original on 5 November 2012.
