= Tona Rozum =

American politician

Member of the South Dakota House of Representatives from the 20th district
- In office January 11, 2011 – January 8, 2019 Serving with Lance Carson (2011–2015); Joshua Klumb (2015–2017); Lance Carson (2017–2019)
- Preceded by: Noel Hamiel
- Succeeded by: Paul Miskimins; Lance Koth

Personal details
- Born: September 20, 1945 (age 80)
- Party: Republican

Tona L. Rozum (born September 20, 1945) is an American politician and a former Republican member of the South Dakota House of Representatives representing District 20 from January 11, 2011, to January 8, 2019.

== Elections ==
- 2012 Rozum and incumbent Representative Lance Carson were unopposed for the June 5, 2012 Republican Primary and won the four-way November 6, 2012 General election where Representative Carson took the first seat and Rozum took the second seat with 5,272 votes (28.85%) against Democratic nominees James Schorzmann and Dave Mitchell, who had run for the seat in 2006 and 2008.
- 2010 When incumbent Republican Representative Noel Hamiel left the Legislature and left a District 20 seat open, Rozum and incumbent Republican Representative Carson were unopposed for the June 8, 2010 Republican Primary and won the three-way November 2, 2010 General election where Representative Carson took the first seat and Rozum took the second seat with 4,611 votes (37.30%) against Independent Becky Haslam.
