= Vilmos Rácz =

Hungarian sprinter (1889–1976)

Vilmos Rácz (March 31, 1889 – July 18, 1976) was a Hungarian athlete. He competed at the 1908 Summer Olympics in London and at the 1912 Summer Olympics in Stockholm.

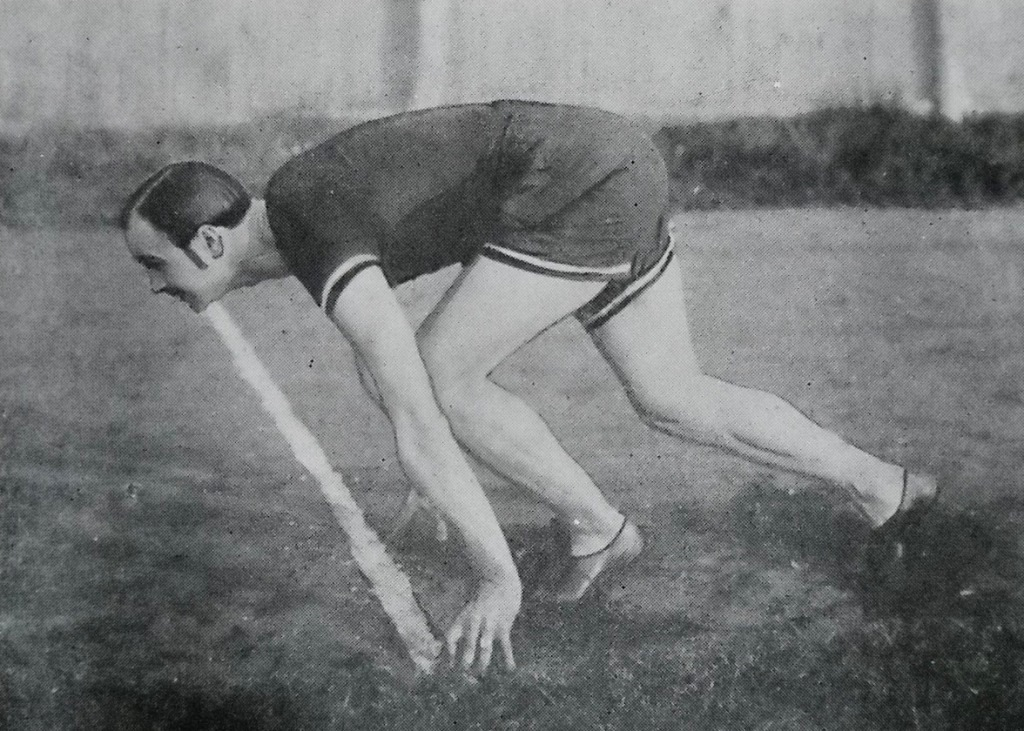
Vilmos Rácz, Hungarian athlete

In the 100 metres, Rácz took second place in his first round heat with a time of 11.4 seconds. He did not advance to the semifinals.

His result in the preliminary heats of the 200 metres was no different, with his time of 23.3 seconds putting him second in his heat again.

== Sources ==
- Cook, Theodore Andrea (1908). The Fourth Olympiad, Being the Official Report. London: British Olympic Association.
- De Wael, Herman (2001). "Athletics 1908". Herman's Full Olympians. Archived from the original on 27 September 2006.
- Wudarski, Pawel (1999). "Wyniki Igrzysk Olimpijskich" (in Polish).
