= John Murray (athlete) =

Irish athletics competitor

Personal information
- Nationality: Irish
- Born: 6 November 1869 Raheen, Carrigrohane, Cork, Ireland
- Died: 14 August 1933 (aged 63) Dundrum, Dublin, Ireland

Sport
- Sport: Athletics
- Events: Discus throw Hammer throw
- Club: County Dublin Harriers

John Murray (6 November 1869 – 14 August 1933) was an Irish athlete who competed at the 1908 Summer Olympics.

== Biography ==
Murray was born in Raheen, Carrigrohane, Cork, Ireland. He was part of a family that excelled in athletics. His younger brothers Denis (a long jumper and sprinter) and William (a sprinter) would both be selected for the 1908 London Olympics.

Murray won the Irish 120 yards title in 1904 and finished second behind Tom Nicolson in the hammer throw event at the British 1907 AAA Championships.

Murray represented the Great Britain team at the 1908 Olympic Games in London, where he participated in the men's discus throw and the men's hammer throw events. His marks in the events are unknown and he failed to progress.

In 1909, Murray won both the discus and hammer Irish titles and represented Ireland against Scotland in July 1909.

After retiring from athletics, Murray became the landlord of a pub in Dublin.
