= Henri Meslot =

French sprinter

Henri Meslot (4 September 1884 – 1 March 1973) was a French athlete who competed at the 1908 Summer Olympics in London. He was born in Paris and died in Toulon.

In the 100 metres event, Meslot took third place in his first round heat and did not advance to the semifinals. He finished second in his three-man heat of the 200 metres competition with a time of 23.2 seconds, not advancing in that event either. He was also eliminated in the first round in the 400 metre hurdles event.

== Sources ==
- Cook, Theodore Andrea (1908). The Fourth Olympiad, Being the Official Report. London: British Olympic Association.
- De Wael, Herman (2001). "Athletics 1908". Herman's Full Olympians. Archived from the original on 27 September 2006.
- Wudarski, Pawel (1999). "Wyniki Igrzysk Olimpijskich" (in Polish).
