= Robert W. Edgren =

American athlete, cartoonist, and journalist

Personal information
- Born: January 7, 1874 Chicago, Illinois, USA
- Died: September 9, 1939 (aged 65) Carmel, California, USA

Sport
- Sport: Athletics
- Event: Discus / shot put/ hammer throw
- Club: Olympic Club, San Francisco; California Golden Bears

Robert Wadsworth Edgren (January 7, 1874 – September 9, 1939) was a nationally syndicated American political and sports cartoonist, reporter, editor and Olympic athlete.

== Background ==
Edgren was born in Chicago, Illinois. During the 1890s Edgren studied at the Mark Hopkins Art Institute. Edgren attended the University of California at Berkeley where he was a member of the first Western track team to enter competitive events in the East.

Edgren placed second and third respectively in the shot put and hammer throw events at the British 1902 AAA Championships.

He competed in the discus and shot put for the American Olympic team at the 1906 Summer Olympics in Athens.

== Career ==
He began his journalism career in 1895 at the original Hearst newspaper, The San Francisco Examiner. He was given the "inconsequential" job of a "handy man" with the Examiner but his work on the build-up to the historic 1897 world heavyweight championship between Bob Fitzsimmons and "Gentleman Jim" Corbett launched his career.

== Political cartoonist ==
He was transferred to the Hearst paper in New York, The Evening Journal, where he was appointed political cartoonist.

He was dispatched to Cuba to cover the Spanish–American War in 1898. Reporting from the scenes of intense fighting, Edgren became famous for his "Sketches from Death," images of war atrocities that shocked readers of Hearst papers across America. When William Randolph Hearst himself told Edgren, "Don't exaggerate so much," an angered Edgren produced 500 photographs to prove the accuracy of his drawings. The images were eventually displayed before the United States Congress, causing a sensation.

Edgren was captured by the Spanish, who intended to try him in a military court, but the young reporter escaped and, disguised as a tugboat engineer, made his way to safety at Key West, Florida.

== Return to sports journalism ==
In 1904, Edgren was hired by Joseph Pulitzer as sports editor of The Evening World. The position gave him a national readership, as his writings and "Miracle of Sports" cartoons were syndicated widely.

=== "Known for truthfulness" ===
Edgren gained a reputation among his readers and his colleagues as being a straight shooter, from the time of his reporting from Cuba in the 1890’s.As The New York Times opined at the time of his death:

Even-tempered always, well-informed in all sports and particularly in boxing, to which he paid much notice, he was known the world over as an authority who always told the truth as he saw the events he watched.

It is a testimony to his integrity that in those days in New York, when the law did not permit the giving of decisions in fights, the wide world was willing to accept the judgment of Bob Edgren in deciding wagers made. When Bob Edgren, in his Evening World column, said so-and-so was the winner nobody complained.

== Declining health and death in California ==
Edgren was seriously injured in an automobile accident in the 1930s. He emerged from several weeks of hospitalization apparently recovered. He was appointed to the California Boxing Commission by Governor James Rolph, resigning in 1932 because of ill health. His health declined and he was bedridden for some time before he died at his apartment at the Monterey Peninsula Country Club in Del Monte, California on September 9, 1939.
