= Lester Stevens =

American athlete

Lester Barber Stevens (February 28, 1884, in Milwaukee, Wisconsin – January 1972, in Waukesha, Wisconsin) was an American athlete. He competed at the 1908 Summer Olympics in London. In the 100 meters, Stevens won his first round heat with a time of 11.2 seconds to advance to the semifinals. There, he placed fourth in his race and did not advance to the final.

== Sources ==
- Cook, Theodore Andrea (1908). The Fourth Olympiad, Being the Official Report. London: British Olympic Association.
- De Wael, Herman (2001). "Athletics 1908". Herman's Full Olympians. Archived from the original on 27 September 2006.
- Wudarski, Pawel (1999). "Wyniki Igrzysk Olimpijskich" (in Polish). Archived from the original on June 19, 2007.
