= Herbert Phillips (athlete) =

South African athlete (1883–1977)

Herbert "Bertie" Thorne Phillips (20 June 1883 – 5 August 1977) was a South African athlete who competed at the 1908 Summer Olympics in London. He was born and died in Pretoria. In the 100 metres, Phillips did not finish his first round heat.

== Sources ==
- Cook, Theodore Andrea (1908). The Fourth Olympiad, Being the Official Report. London: British Olympic Association.
- De Wael, Herman (2001). "Athletics 1908". Herman's Full Olympians. Archived from the original on 27 September 2006.
- Wudarski, Pawel (1999). "Wyniki Igrzysk Olimpijskich" (in Polish). Archived from the original on 16 February 2009.
