= 1902 AAA Championships =

Outdoor track and field competition

- Dates: 5 July 1902
- Host city: London, England
- Venue: Stamford Bridge (stadium)
- Level: Senior
- Type: Outdoor
- Events: 16

The 1902 AAA Championships was the 1902 edition of the annual outdoor track and field competition organised by the Amateur Athletic Association (AAA). It was held on Saturday 5 July 1902 at the Stamford Bridge (stadium) in London, England, in front of 4,000 spectators.

For the second successive year a new event was added to the Championships, when the 220 yards sprint was introduced. There were now 16 events contested.

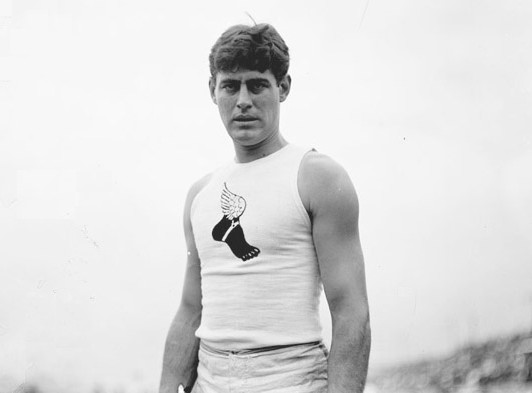
American Samuel Jones won the high jump

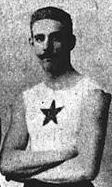
Hungarian Kauser won the pole jump

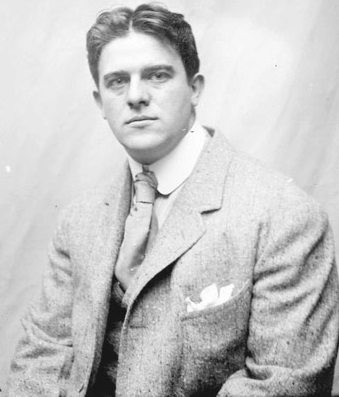
Wesley Coe successfully defended his shot put title

== Results ==
Event	Gold		Silver		Bronze	
100 yards	(United States) Arthur Duffey	10.0	Reginald Wadsley	1 yd	(Leinster) Denis Murray	2 ft
220 yards	Reginald Wadsley	22.4	Jimmy Tremeer	2 yd	George Brewill	1 yd
440 yards	George White	50.2	Reginald Wadsley	4 yd	G.P. Constantine	2 yd
880 yards	Arthur Manning	1:59.8	David Cowan	2 yd	J.H. Bessell	2 yd
1 mile	Joseph Binks	4:16.8 NR	Henry Hawtrey	2 yd	Albert Barker	12 yd
4 miles	Alfred Shrubb	20:01.4	Fred Appleby	20:16.6	(New Zealand) William Simpson	20:55.4
10 miles	Alfred Shrubb	52:25.4	Albert Barker	52:57.0	Albert Aldridge	53:19.0
steeplechase	George Martin	11:31.2	J. Sturt	5 yd	only 2 finished	
120yd hurdles	(New Zealand) George Smith	16.0	Alfred Trafford	2 yd	William Phillips	16.8
2 miles walk	William Sturgess	14:46.6	G. A. Bush	40 yd	W. Endean	50 yd
7 miles walk	William Sturgess	52:49.4	Jack Butler	52:58.0	H. W. Hartley	55:52.5
high jump	(United States) Samuel Jones	1.905	(Leinster) Peter O'Connor	1.880	(Leinster) Con Leahy	1.854
pole jump	(Hungary) Jakab Kauser	3.25	W. H. Hodgson	3.22	only 2 competitors	
long jump	(Leinster) Peter O'Connor	7.20	(Leinster) Con Leahy; Lionel Cornish	6.73; 6.73	not awarded	
shot put	(United States) Wesley Coe	13.07	(United States) Robert W. Edgren	11.78	only 2 competitors	
hammer throw	(Leinster) Tom Kiely	43.52	Ernest May	39.62 NR	(United States) Robert W. Edgren	36.90
