= Cornelis den Held =

Dutch sprinter

Cornelis Johannes den Held (born 19 July 1883 in Rotterdam, died 12 September 1962 in Rotterdam) was a Dutch athlete, who competed at the 1908 Summer Olympics in London. He was born and died in Rotterdam, South Holland.

In the 200 metres, Den Held took fourth place in his first round heat and did not advance to the semifinals. He also competed in the 400 metres, placing second in his two-man preliminary heat to not advance in that event either.

== Sources ==
- Cook, Theodore Andrea (1908). The Fourth Olympiad, Being the Official Report. London: British Olympic Association.
- De Wael, Herman (2001). "Athletics 1908". Herman's Full Olympians. Archived from the original on 27 September 2006.
- Wudarski, Pawel (1999). "Wyniki Igrzysk Olimpijskich" (in Polish). Archived from the original on 16 February 2009.
