= Karl Fryksdal =

Swedish athlete

Karl Fryksdal (22 June 1885 – 9 April 1944) was a Swedish athlete. He competed at the 1908 Summer Olympics in London. In the 100 metres, Fryksdal took third place in his first round heat and did not advance to the semifinals.

== Sources ==
- Cook, Theodore Andrea (1908). The Fourth Olympiad, Being the Official Report. London: British Olympic Association.
- De Wael, Herman (2001). "Athletics 1908". Herman's Full Olympians. Archived from the original on 27 September 2006.
- Wudarski, Pawel (1999). "Wyniki Igrzysk Olimpijskich" (in Polish).
