= Gloria (Rutter) =

1974 choral work by John Rutter

- Sacred vocal music by John Rutter
- Cover of the score published by Oxford University Press
- Text: Gloria
- Language: Latin
- Dedication: Mel Olson
- Performed: 5 May 1974: Omaha, Nebraska
- Published: 1976
- Movements: 3
- Scoring: mixed choir; brass ensemble; percussion; organ or orchestra

John Rutter's Gloria is a musical setting of parts of the Latin Gloria. He composed it in 1974 on a commission from Mel Olson, and conducted the premiere in Omaha, Nebraska. He structured the text in three movements and scored it for choir, brass, percussion and organ, with an alternative version for choir and orchestra. It was published in 1976 by Oxford University Press.

The work has been recorded several times, including a first recording conducted by the composer, and has enjoyed success over the years. It has been performed by both professionals and lay ensembles. Described as "exalted, devotional and jubilant", it has been part of Christmas concerts.

== History ==
John Rutter grew up in the tradition of Anglican church music. He was a chorister already at Highgate School, taking part in the first recording of Benjamin Britten's War Requiem, conducted by the composer in 1963. He was a choir member at Clare College, Cambridge, where he studied. He published his first compositions at age 18.

Gloria resulted from a commission of Mel Olson, who conducted choirs in Omaha, Nebraska, for his choir The Voices of Mel Olson. It was Rutter's first commission from the US. It is a setting of parts of the Latin Gloria, part of the mass. Rutter composed it in 1974. He structured the text in three movements and scored it for choir, brass, percussion and organ, with an alternative version for choir and orchestra. Although setting a liturgical text, it was conceived as a concert piece. Rutter composed it according to Olson's specifications, noting his influence: "Much of the credit must go to Mel Olson … because, in telling me what he was looking for in a new choral work, he was telling me what thousands of other choral directors were looking for too."

Rutter conducted the premiere in Omaha on 5 May 1974, as his first premiere in the United States. It was published in 1976 by Oxford University Press in versions for organ or orchestra.

== Music ==
The text of the piece is the Gloria, the second part of the Latin Order of Mass. Rutter structured it in three movements, following the fast-slow-fast scheme typical of concertos:

1. Allegro vivace – Gloria in excelsis Deo
2. Andante – Domine Deus
3. Vivace e ritmico – Quoniam tu solus sanctus

The instrumentation for the brass version is a brass ensemble of four trumpets, two tenor trombones, bass trombone, tuba, timpani and percussion, and organ. The duration is given as 17 minutes.

The composer explains the structure as "fast, slow, fast, in common with symphonic practice", and describes the movements as "exalted, devotional and jubilant". He notes about the scoring: "The accompaniment is for brass ensemble with timpani, percussion and organ – a combination which in the outer movements makes quite a joyful noise unto the Lord, but which is used more softly and introspectively in the middle movement".

=== I. Gloria in excelsis Deo ===
The text of the first movement is "Gloria in excelsis Deo" (Glory to God in the highest), the angels' song from the Annunciation to the shepherds, as narrated by Luke. It is marked Allegro vivace. It begins with a brass fanfare and stays mostly forte. Brass and voices often alternate. Reviewer Malcolm Riley of Gramophone notes the movement's "incisive, punchy, syncopated brass opening" which sets the scene. Bob Briggs notes in a review "strong rhythms and triumphant shouts from the chorus".

=== II. Domine Deus ===
The text of the second movement, "Domine Deus" (Lord God) addresses Jesus as the Lamb of God, asking for mercy and for listening to prayers. It is marked Andante. The movement is mostly soft (piano). It is dominated by an ostinato of the organ, and contains solos for the upper voices. It has been described as "a gentle and restrained prayer".

=== III. Quoniam tu solus sanctus ===
The text of the third movement is the conclusion, "Quoniam tu solus sanctus" (For you alone are Holy), ending in a doxology. It is marked Vivace e ritmico. The movement includes the climax of the work, a recapitulation of the beginning in text and music. It contains a fugue "Cum Sancto Spiritu", and ends with a fast Amen.

=== Influences and reception ===
Rutter notes to have been influenced by Francis Poulenc, Igor Stravinsky and William Walton. Poulenc composed a stand-alone Gloria for use in concerts in 1959. The brass treatment in Rutter's work shows similarities to Walton's cantata Belshazzar’s Feast. Rutter also notes the influence of Gregorian chant throughout the work. A reviewer notes as Rutter's hallmarks: "an unfailing knack to get to the root of the text, exquisitely balanced vocal writing, melting harmonies, intensely sweet turns of phrase (sometimes overtly saccharine), short ecstatic climaxes, but also a willingness to be astringent, and rhythmically powerful." Another reviewer attributes the lasting success of Rutter's music to the facts that he "writes music that people want to perform and to hear", and that it is interesting and challenging for performers "without putting insuperable obstacles in their path. Because of its relation to the angelic annunciation, it has been included in Christmas concerts. Riley described the work in 2011 as evergreen.

== Recordings ==
The composer conducted the Cambridge Singers, the Philip Jones Brass Ensemble and organist John Scott in the first recording in 1984. A 1995 recording combines Gloria with Leonard Bernstein's Chichester Psalms and works by Francis Poulenc, including Quatre petites prières de saint François d’Assise and Litanies à la Vierge Noire. Timothy Brown conducted the Choir of Clare College, Cambridge, The Wallace Collection and organist Richard Pearce.

The Mormon Tabernacle Choir recorded the work in 1997 in a collection A Christmas Gloria with the Canadian Brass. The version with orchestra was included in a 2001 collection Gloria & other sacred music by Rutter, performed by the choir Polyphony, the Wallace Collection, the City of London Sinfonia and organist Andrew Lumsden conducted by Stephen Layton. A 2011 recording of the brass version by the choirs of St Albans Cathedral, combines Gloria with Rutter's Magnificat and Te Deum. Andrew Lucas conducted the choirs with treble voices of the cathedral's boys and girls choirs, the ensemble DeChorum and organist Tom Winpenny, bringing the music which had "semi-secular" origins back to the text's sacred function. The singing was called "spectacular, polished and vibrant".
