= Gaston Lamotte =

French sprinter (1886–1964)

Gaston Marie Lamotte
Personal information
- National team: France
- Born: January 27, 1886 Paris, France
- Died: April 14, 1964 (aged 78) Corneville-sur-Risle, France

Sport
- Country: France
- Sport: Athletics

Gaston Lamotte (1886–1964) was a French athlete. He competed at the 1908 Summer Olympics in London. In the 100 metres, Lamotte took third place in his first round heat and did not advance to the semifinals.

== Sources ==
- Cook, Theodore Andrea (1908). The Fourth Olympiad, Being the Official Report. London: British Olympic Association.
- De Wael, Herman (2001). "Athletics 1908". Herman's Full Olympians. Archived from the original on 27 September 2006.
- Wudarski, Pawel (1999). "Wyniki Igrzysk Olimpijskich" (in Polish). Archived from the original on 16 February 2009.
