= Evert Koops =

Dutch athlete (1885–1938)

Personal information
- Full name: Evert Koops
- Nickname: Eddy
- Nationality: Dutch
- Born: January 2, 1885 Arnhem, Netherlands
- Died: November 10, 1938 (aged 53) Arnhem, Netherlands

Sport
- Country: Netherlands
- Sport: Athletics
- Events: 100 metres, 200 metres, 400 metre hurdles, standing long jump, medley relay

Achievements and titles
- Olympic finals: 1908 Summer Olympics

Evert "Eddy" Koops (2 January 1885 – 10 November 1938) was a Dutch athlete. He competed at the 1908 Summer Olympics in London. He was born and died in Arnhem.

In the 100 metres, Koops placed fourth of four in his first round heat, eliminating him from the competition. The next day, he did the same in his preliminary heat of the Men's 200 metres. He was eliminated in the semi-finals in the 400 metre hurdles competition. He also participated in the standing long jump event, but his result is unknown.

He was also a member of the Dutch relay team, which was eliminated in the first round of the medley contest.

== Sources ==
- Cook, Theodore Andrea (1908). The Fourth Olympiad, Being the Official Report. London: British Olympic Association.
- De Wael, Herman (2001). "Athletics 1908". Herman's Full Olympians. Archived from the original on 27 September 2006.
- Wudarski, Pawel (1999). "Wyniki Igrzysk Olimpijskich" (in Polish). Archived from the original on 16 February 2009.
- Heere, A. and Kappenburg, B. (2000) 1870 – 2000, 130 jaar atletiek in Nederland. Groenevelt b.v.
- Bijkerk, T. (2004) Olympisch Oranje. De Vrieseborch
