= Robert C. Duncan (athlete) =

British sprinter (1887–1957)

Robert Duncan
Personal information
- Nationality: British
- Born: 4 October 1887 Boston, USA
- Died: 3 May 1957 (aged 69) Montreal, Canada

Sport
- Sport: Athletics
- Event: Sprints
- Club: West of Scotland Harriers

Robert Cochran Duncan (4 October 1887 – 4 May 1957) was a British sprinter who competed at two Olympic Games; the 1908 Summer Olympics and the 1912 Summer Olympics.

== Biography ==
Duncan represented Great Britain at the 1908 Summer Olympics. In the 100 metres, Duncan won his first round heat with a time of 11.4 seconds to advance to the semifinals. There, he finished fourth and last in his semifinal heat to be eliminated. He was not as successful in the 200 metres. His time of 23.1 seconds put him in second place behind Georges Malfait and eliminated him from competition.

Four years later, Duncan represented Great Britain at the 1912 Summer Olympics in Stockholm. At the Olympics he was eliminated in the 100 metres heats but progresses to the semi-finals of the 200 metres.

From 1908 until 1912 he won four 220 yard races for Scotland against Ireland in the annual international match. Duncan was a mamber of the West of Scotland Harriers (a club which went out of existence in 1978).

== Sources ==
- Cook, Theodore Andrea (1908). The Fourth Olympiad, Being the Official Report. London: British Olympic Association.
- De Wael, Herman (2001). "Athletics 1908". Herman's Full Olympians. Archived from the original on 27 September 2006.
- Wudarski, Pawel (1999). "Wyniki Igrzysk Olimpijskich" (in Polish).
