= Sven Låftman =

Swedish athlete

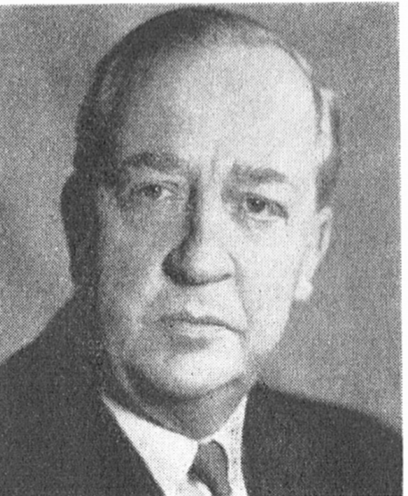
Sven Låftman

Sven Låftman (December 16, 1887 – July 5, 1977) was a Swedish athlete. He competed at the 1908 Summer Olympics in London.

Låftman won his preliminary heat in the 200 metres with a time of 23.8 seconds, the slowest winning time in the round. This qualified Låftman to compete in the semifinals, but he did not start in his semifinal heat.

He did not advance to the semifinals in the 400 metres after placing third and last in his preliminary heat.

== Sources ==
- Cook, Theodore Andrea (1908). The Fourth Olympiad, Being the Official Report. London: British Olympic Association.
- De Wael, Herman (2001). "Athletics 1908". Herman's Full Olympians.
- Wudarski, Pawel (1999). "Wyniki Igrzysk Olimpijskich" (in Polish).
