= Jacobus Hoogveld =

Dutch athlete (1884–1948)

Jacobus Johannes Hoogveld (August 4, 1884 in Arnhem – February 17, 1948 in Arnhem) was a Dutch athlete, who competed at the 1908 Summer Olympics in London.

In the 100 metres, Hoogveld took third place in his first round heat and did not advance to the semifinals. He took third and last place in his preliminary heat of the 200 metres to be eliminated in that event as well.

Hoogveld lost his preliminary heat in the 400 metres as well, placing second of two in the race.

== Sources ==
- Cook, Theodore Andrea (1908). The Fourth Olympiad, Being the Official Report. London: British Olympic Association.
- De Wael, Herman (2001). "Athletics 1908". Herman's Full Olympians. Archived from the original on 27 September 2006.
- Wudarski, Pawel (1999). "Wyniki Igrzysk Olimpijskich" (in Polish). Archived from the original on February 16, 2009.
