= The Lord Is My Shepherd (Rutter) =

- Anthem by John Rutter
- Key: C major
- Related: Requiem (1985)
- Text: Psalm 23
- Dedication: "For Mel Olson and the Chancel Choir of the First United Methodist Church in Omaha, Nebraska"
- Published: 1978
- Scoring: SATB choir and organ

The Lord Is My Shepherd is a sacred choral composition by John Rutter, a setting of Psalm 23. The work was published by Oxford University Press in 1978. Marked "Slow but flowing", the music is in C major and 2/4 time. Rutter composed it for Mel Olson and the Chancel Choir of the First United Methodist Church in Omaha, Nebraska. He later included the work as a movement in his Requiem of 1985, then with orchestra or chamber ensemble. In 1993, Rutter also made it part of his Psalmfest, a collection of nine psalms written over 20 years. For that version, he used also soloists.

== Text and music ==
The biblical text of Psalm 23 is from The 1928 U. S. Book of Common Prayer. After a short instrumental introduction, the first verses are sung by the sopranos, while the men's voices continue in unison "He shall convert my soul". "Yea, though I walk thro' the valley of the shadow of death" is expressed by five parts (with divided bass voices) in homophony in low register, while "I will fear no evil" turns to four part setting, which is kept for the following verses, structured by instrumental interludes. In a recapitulation of the beginning, sopranos and now also tenors sing in unison "But thy loving kindness". All four voices begin in unison "And I will dwell" but divide for the climax "in the house of the Lord", reaching forte this only time in the piece. The words are repeated a few times, diminishing and slowing down to a soft "for ever".

== Selected recordings ==
Psalmfest, including the version with soprano and tenor soloists, was recorded in 2014 by the St Albans Cathedral Choir, the Abbey Girls’ Choir and the Royal Philharmonic Orchestra, conducted by Andrew Lucas.
