= Edgar Kiralfy =

American sprinter

Edgar Graham Kiralfy (August 20, 1884 – May 13, 1928) was an American athlete. He competed at the 1908 Summer Olympics in London. He was born in New York City. In the 100 metres, Kiralfy placed fourth of five in his first round heat to be eliminated from competition.

== Sources ==
- Cook, Theodore Andrea (1908). The Fourth Olympiad, Being the Official Report. London: British Olympic Association.
- De Wael, Herman (2001). "Athletics 1908". Herman's Full Olympians. Archived from the original on September 27, 2006.
- Wudarski, Pawel (1999). "Wyniki Igrzysk Olimpijskich" (in Polish). Archived from the original on February 16, 2009.
