= Willy Kohlmey =

German sprinter

Wilhelm ("Willy") Kohlmey (July 19, 1881 – September 9, 1953) was a German athlete. He competed at the 1908 Summer Olympics in London. In the 100 metres, Kohlmey took third place in his first round heat with a time of 12.0 seconds. He did not advance to the semifinals.

== Sources ==
- Cook, Theodore Andrea (1908). The Fourth Olympiad, Being the Official Report. London: British Olympic Association.
- De Wael, Herman (2001). "Athletics 1908". Herman's Full Olympians. Archived from the original on 27 September 2006.
- Wudarski, Pawel (1999). "Wyniki Igrzysk Olimpijskich" (in Polish).
