= Eduard Schönecker =

Austrian athlete

Erich Eduard "Edi" Schönecker (January 21, 1885 – April 6, 1963) was an Austrian athlete, football (soccer) player, and architect. He competed at the 1908 Summer Olympics in London.

== Biography ==
In the 100 metres event, Schönecker finished fourth place in his first round heat and did not advance to the semifinals. He placed third in his preliminary heat of the 200 metres competition to be eliminated from that event as well. He played football for SK Rapid Wien and was able to win 1 cap for Austria. He is also well known for building sports stadiums. He designed the Stadium Pfarrwiese, which was the home of Rapid Wien until 1981. He was responsible for the construction of the Hohe Warte Stadium, which is the home of Austria's oldest football club First Vienna FC. This stadium was the biggest in Europe at this time and is still in use.

== Sources ==
- Eduard Schönecker's profile at Sports Reference.com
- Biography of Eduard Schönecker (in German)
- Cook, Theodore Andrea (1908). The Fourth Olympiad, Being the Official Report. London: British Olympic Association.
- De Wael, Herman (2001). "Athletics 1908". Herman's Full Olympians. Archived from the original on 27 September 2006.
- Wudarski, Pawel (1999). "Wyniki Igrzysk Olimpijskich" (in Polish). Archived from the original on 16 February 2009.
