= Knut Stenborg =

Swedish athlete

Knut Stenborg (25 March 1890, in Hjo – 10 October 1946, in Vänersborg) was a Swedish athlete. He competed in the 1908 Summer Olympics in London and in the 1912 Summer Olympics in Stockholm.

In the 100 metres, Stenborg placed second in his first round heat with a time of 11.5 seconds. His loss to Robert Duncan eliminated Stenborg from competition.

Stenborg placed fourth and last in his preliminary heat of the 200 metres, not advancing to the semifinals in that event either.

Four years later, he was eliminated in the first round of the 200 metres competition. In the 400 metres event he was eliminated in the semi-finals. He was also a member of the Swedish relay team, which was eliminated in the first round of the 4x400 metre relay contest.

== Sources ==
- Cook, Theodore Andrea (1908). The Fourth Olympiad, Being the Official Report. London: British Olympic Association.
- De Wael, Herman (2001). "Athletics 1908". Herman's Full Olympians. Archived from the original on 27 September 2006.
- Wudarski, Pawel (1999). "Wyniki Igrzysk Olimpijskich" (in Polish).
