= Denis Murray (athlete) =

Irish sprinter (1878–1944)

Personal information
- Born: 3 March 1878 Gurrane, Carriganimmy, Cork
- Died: 19 September 1944 (aged 66) Newcastle, Dublin

Sport
- Sport: Athletics
- Event: sprinting / long jump
- Club: County Dublin Harriers

Denis Bernard Murray (3 March 1878 – 19 September 1944) was an Irish athlete, who competed at the 1908 Summer Olympics in London.

== Biography ==
Murray finished third in the 100 yards behind Arthur Duffey and Reginald Wadsley, at the 1901 AAA Championships, a result which was repeated the following year at the 1902 AAA Championships. Murray finished runner-up behind John Morton at the 1906 AAA Championships and jumped to second place behind Wilfred Bleaden in the long jump event at the 1908 AAA Championships.

Murray represented Great Britain at the 1908 Summer Olympics in London. In the 100 metres, Murray placed third in his first round heat to be eliminated from competition. In the Men's Long jump, Murray finished 9th.

He was part of a family that excelled in athletics. His older brother John (who was a throw expert) and younger brother William (a sprinter) would both be selected for the 1908 London Olympics.

== Sources ==
- Cook, Theodore Andrea (1908). The Fourth Olympiad, Being the Official Report. London: British Olympic Association.
- De Wael, Herman (2001). "Athletics 1908". Herman's Full Olympians. Archived from the original on 27 September 2006.
- Wudarski, Pawel (1999). "Wyniki Igrzysk Olimpijskich" (in Polish). Archived from the original on 16 February 2009.
