= Samuel Hurdsfield =

British sprinter

Sam Hurdsfield
Personal information
- Nationality: British (English)
- Born: 19 March 1876 Knutsford, Cheshire East, England
- Died: 1965 (aged 88–89) Crewe, England

Sport
- Sport: Athletics
- Event: Sprints
- Club: Salford Harriers

Samuel Hurdsfield (19 March 1876 – 1965) was a British athlete and railway worker. He competed as a sprinter at the 1908 Summer Olympics in London.

== Biography ==
Hurdsfield was born in Knutsford and ran for Knutsford Harriers before also running for Crewe Tally Ho and then Salford Harriers who he joined in 1901.

By trade Hurdsfield worked for the London and North Western Railway as a machinist, won the 1906 Northern Counties 220 yards title and two years later in 1908 won a second title after success in the 440 yards event.

Hurdsfield represented Great Britain at the 1908 Summer Olympics. In the 200 metres, Hurdsfield won his preliminary heat with a time of 23.6 seconds to advance to the semifinals. There, he finished fourth and last in his heat to be eliminated without advancing to the final.

After he retired from running he acted as an official for the Railway Athletic Association Championships.

== Sources ==
- Cook, Theodore Andrea (1908). The Fourth Olympiad, Being the Official Report. London: British Olympic Association.
- De Wael, Herman (2001). "Athletics 1908". Herman's Full Olympians. Archived from the original on 27 September 2006.
- Wudarski, Pawel (1999). "Wyniki Igrzysk Olimpijskich" (in Polish).
