= Heinrich Rehder =

German sprinter

Heinrich Rehder (22 April 1887 – 19 December 1976) was a German athlete. He competed at the 1908 Summer Olympics in London. In the 100 metres, Rehder took third place in his first round heat with a time of 11.8 seconds to be eliminated without advancing to the semifinals.

== Sources ==
- Cook, Theodore Andrea (1908). The Fourth Olympiad, Being the Official Report. London: British Olympic Association.
- De Wael, Herman (2001). "Athletics 1908". Herman's Full Olympians. Archived from the original on 27 September 2006.
- Wudarski, Pawel (1999). "Wyniki Igrzysk Olimpijskich" (in Polish). Archived from the original on 16 February 2009.
