= William Murray (Irish athlete) =

Irish sprinter and Olympian

Personal information
- Nationality: Irish
- Born: 18 July 1881 Raheen, Carrigrohane, Cork, ireland
- Died: 17 October 1942 (aged 61) Dublin, Ireland

Sport
- Sport: Athletics
- Event: Sprints
- Club: County Dublin Harriers

William Andrew Murray (18 July 1881 – 17 October 1942) was an Irish athlete who competed at the 1908 Summer Olympics.

== Biography ==
Murray was born in Raheen in Ireland. In 1904 he set the second fastest time in the world after recording 22.3 over 220 yards at Glasgow on 13 August.

He was part of a family that excelled in athletics. His older brothers John (who was a throw expert) and Denis (a multiple AAA Championships medalist) would both be selected for the 1908 London Olympics.

William also represented Great Britain at the 1908 Summer Olympics. In the 100 metres event, Murray took fourth place in his first round heat to be eliminated without advancing to the semifinals.

== Sources ==
- Cook, Theodore Andrea (1908). The Fourth Olympiad, Being the Official Report. London: British Olympic Association.
- De Wael, Herman (2001). "Athletics 1908". Herman's Full Olympians. Archived from the original on 27 September 2006.
- Wudarski, Pawel (1999). "Wyniki Igrzysk Olimpijskich" (in Polish).
