= David Beland =

Canadian athlete

David Beland (October 23, 1886 – February 21, 1924) was a Canadian athlete. He competed at the 1908 Summer Olympics in London. In the 100 metres, Beland placed third of four in his first round heat to be eliminated from competition. Beland was born in Quebec City, and not in Louiseville, a perpetuated myth.
