= Ernst Greven =

Dutch sprinter

Ernestus "Ernst" Johannes Christiaan Greven (September 8, 1885 – March 8, 1924) was a Dutch athlete, who competed at the 1908 Summer Olympics in London. Born in The Hague, he died at age 38 in Zoppot near Danzig in Poland.

In the 100 metres, Greven placed fifth (last) in his first round heat to be eliminated from competition. He also placed last in his preliminary heat of the 200 metres, taking third in the three-man heat.

== Sources ==
- Cook, Theodore Andrea (1908). The Fourth Olympiad, Being the Official Report. London: British Olympic Association.
- De Wael, Herman (2001). "Athletics 1908". Herman's Full Olympians. Archived from the original on 27 September 2006.
- Wudarski, Pawel (1999). "Wyniki Igrzysk Olimpijskich" (in Polish). Archived from the original on 16 February 2009.
