= Ragnar Stenberg =

Finnish sprinter

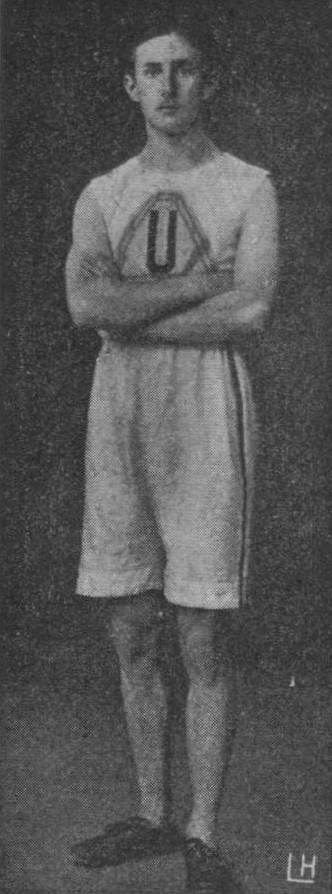
- Ragnar Stenberg circa 1906, wearing Helsingin Unitas uniform

Personal information
- Full name: Ragnar Olof Jakob Stenberg
- National team: Finland
- Born: 14 June 1887 Helsinki, Grand Duchy of Finland, Russian Empire
- Died: 6 December 1954 (aged 67) Helsinki, Finland
- Education: Licentiate of dentistry, 1914
- Occupation: Dentist

Sport
- Sport: Track and field
- Event: Sprint
- Club: Helsingin Unitas

Achievements and titles
- Personal bests: 100 m: 10.9 s; 200 m: 23.6 s; 400 m: 52.4 s; 110 m hurdles: 16.2 s

Ragnar Olof Jakob Stenberg (14 June 1887 – 6 December 1954) was a Finnish sprinter and a sports leader.

== Athletics ==
=== Olympic Games ===
He was injured during the Finnish Olympic trials of 1908, but was selected based on his performance the previous year.

Ragnar Stenberg at the Olympic Games
Games	Event	Result	Notes
1908 Summer Olympics	100 metres	5th in heat, did not advance to semifinals	Source:
1908 Summer Olympics	200 metres	3rd in heat, did not advance to semifinals	Official records say he finished his heat, but Finnish sources say he did not finish due to muscle strain
1908 Summer Olympics	400 metres	Did not start	Source:
1908 Summer Olympics	800 metres	Did not start	Source:
1908 Summer Olympics	110 metres hurdles	Did not start	Source:
1908 Summer Olympics	400 metres hurdles	Did not start	Source:

He was a board member of the Finnish Olympic Committee in 1919–1920 and 1923–1926.

=== National ===
He is credited with two Finnish record times in 400 metres:

- 9 September 1906, he tied the current record with 52.4 seconds
- 31 August 1908, his time 53.0 is noted as a national record

In the Finnish Championships in Athletics, he won a five golds:

- 400 metres: 1907
- 110 metre hurdles: 1907 and 1909
- combined running championship: 1907 and 1909

=== Other ===
Stenberg was a member of the International Association of Athletics Federations Council in 1921–1926.

He was the chairman of the track and field athletics chapter of the Finnish Gymnastics and Sports Federation, the predecessor of the Finnish Athletics Federation, in 1914–1915 and 1919–1922.

He was a manager of Clas Thunberg.

== Personal ==
His parents were father Jakob Esaias Stenberg and mother Anna Maria Brofeldt. His brother R. E. Stenberg was also a sprinter, who broke the Finnish record for 4 × 100 metres relay in 1917.

He graduated as a licentiate of dentistry in 1914. His practice was in Helsinki.
