= Georgios Skoutarides =

Greek athletics competitor

Georgios Skoutarides (Greek: Γεώργιος Σκουταρίδης) (1885 – 1962) was a Greek athlete. He competed at the 1906 Intercalated Games in Athens and at the 1908 Summer Olympics in London. In 1906, he was eliminated in the first round of the 110 metre hurdles competition. Two years later, Skoutarides ran in the first heat of the 100 metres, placing second to Edward Duffy and not advancing to the semifinals. He also participated in the 110 metre hurdles event where he was also eliminated in the first round.

== Sources ==
- Cook, Theodore Andrea (1908). The Fourth Olympiad, Being the Official Report. London: British Olympic Association.
- De Wael, Herman (2001). "Athletics 1908". Herman's Full Olympians. Archived from the original on 27 September 2006.
- Biography of Georgios Skoutarides (in Greek)
