= William Hamilton (sprinter) =

American athlete

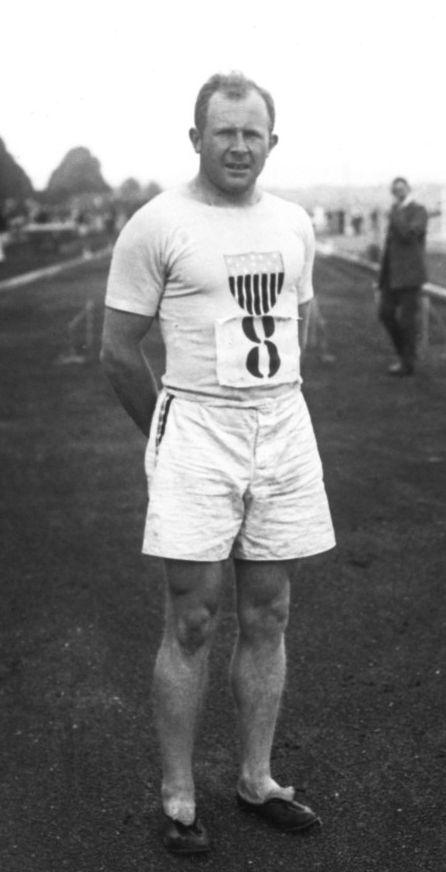
- Hamilton in 1908

Personal information
- Full name: William Franklin Hamilton
- Born: August 11, 1883 State Center Township, Iowa, U.S.
- Died: August 1, 1955 (aged 71) Los Angeles, California, U.S.
- Height: 5 ft 9 in (1.76 m)
- Weight: 150 lb (70 kg)

Sport
- Country: United States
- Sport: Athletics
- Event: 100–400 m
- Club: Chicago AA

Achievements and titles
- Personal bests: 100 m – 11.0 (1908); 200 m – 21.7 (1907); 400 m – 50.1 (1905)
Medal record
Men's athletics
Representing the United States
Olympic Games
Gold medal – first place	1908 London	Medley relay

William Franklin "Red" Hamilton (August 11, 1883 – August 1, 1955) was an American sprinter who competed at the 1908 Summer Olympics in London.

Hamilton was a member of the 1600 m medley relay team that won the gold medal. He ran the first leg of 200 meters and was followed by Nate Cartmell (200 m), John Taylor (400 m) and Mel Sheppard (800 m). Hamilton gave the team a six-yard lead over the nearest competitor, running a split time of 22.0 seconds. Hamilton also competed in the 100 m and the 200 m events. He won the first-round heat of the 100 m in a time of 11.2 seconds but did not start the second round. In the 200 m, he was eliminated in the semifinal.

Hamilton studied and competed for the Iowa Teachers College, now known as the University of Northern Iowa.
