= Edward Duffy (athlete) =

South African sprinter (1883–1918)

Edward John Duffy (6 June 1883 – 19 October 1918) was a South African athlete. He competed at the 1908 Summer Olympics in London.

He was born in Ryno, North West and died in Johannesburg.

Duffy was a semifinalist (top 17) in the 100 metres at the 1908 Olympic Games, winning the first heat with a time of 11 ^{3}/_{5} seconds. Duffy took third place in semifinal 3, losing to James Rector, the eventual silver medalist.

Duffy lost in the preliminary heats of the 200 metres, placing second to Harold Huff. His time was 23.2 seconds, .4 slower than Huff.
