= Defkalion Rediadis =

Greek sports shooter

Personal information
- Born: 2 February 1882 Syros, Greece
- Died: 1955 (aged 72–73)

Sport
- Sport: Sports shooting

Defkalion Rediadis (2 February 1882 – 5 February 1955) was a Greek politician, lawyer, and sports shooter. He competed in three events at the 1908 Summer Olympics.

He was born in Syros and studied law. He went into private practice as a lawyer and was actively involved in sports, competing in the Olympic Games of 1908 in shooting and taking several administrative positions. From 1924 to 1955, he was president of the Piraeus Association, general secretary of the Piraeus Hunters Club as well as a member of the Olympic Games Committee. In 1936, he was appointed deputy minister of finance and subsequently minister of merchant shipping until December 1938 when he resigned.

He was married to Mari Stai and had three children, Georgios Rediadis, who served as president of SEGAS and was a lawyer, Dimitrios Rediadis, also a lawyer and politician and Aspasia wife of Konstantinos Katris.

He died on 5 February 1955.
