= Mikhail Paskalides =

Greek sprinter

Mikhail Paskalides (also Michael Paschalidis, Greek: Μιχαήλ Πασχαλίδης) was a Greek athlete. He competed at the 1908 Summer Olympics in London.

In the 100 metres, Paskalides took fourth place in his first round heat and was eliminated from further competition. He took second in his two-man heat of the 200 metres with a time of 24.0 seconds and was eliminated from that competition as well.

== Sources ==
- Cook, Theodore Andrea (1908). The Fourth Olympiad, Being the Official Report. London: British Olympic Association.
- De Wael, Herman (2001). "Athletics 1908". Herman's Full Olympians.
- Wudarski, Pawel (1999). "Wyniki Igrzysk Olimpijskich" (in Polish).
