= Mel Olson =

American choral conductor (1930–2001)

- Born: Melvin Donald Olson; December 24, 1930; Wisconsin, US
- Died: December 15, 2001 (aged 70); Nevada City, California, US
- Occupation: Choral conductor

Melvin Donald Olson (December 24, 1930 – December 15, 2001) was an American choral conductor who introduced the compositions of John Rutter to the United States.

== Career ==
Born in Wisconsin, Olson studied at the Northwestern University and received his master's degree from Westminster Choir College. He directed, among others, the choir The Voices of Mel Olson, which was founded in 1969 and later called Master Singers, in Omaha, Nebraska.

Olson and his choirs are the dedicatees of several of Rutter's works. He commissioned Gloria in 1974 for The Voices of Mel Olson, which Rutter set according to Olson's specifications. Olson traveled to the UK to discuss details with the composer, who later credited him with influencing his compositions: "Much of the credit must go to Mel Olson … because, in telling me what he was looking for in a new choral work, he was telling me what thousands of other choral directors were looking for too.” Olson commissioned Rutter to compose "I will lift up mine eyes" (Psalm 121) for his church choir and orchestra at the First United Methodist Church of Omaha, where it was first performed one day after the Gloria.

In 1976, Olson commissioned James E. Fritschel to write Give Ear, O Ye Heavens, after Deuteronomy 32:1 for unaccompanied double chorus, for The Voices of Mel Olson. Rutter dedicated his anthem The Lord is my Shepherd (Psalm 23, published in 1978), to Olson and his Chancel Choir of the First United Methodist Church.

Edwin R. Fissinger composed on commission for Olson and the Voices of Mel Olson To Everything There Is A Season, after Ecclesiastes III, for soprano, mezzo-soprano, tenor, speaker and choir, published in 1979 by Jenson Publications. Olson died in Nevada City, California.
