= Patrick Roche (athlete) =

Irish sprinter and Olympian

James Patrick Roche
Personal information
- Nationality: Irish
- Born: 1886 Caherciveen, County Kerry, Ireland
- Died: 7 June 1917 (aged 30–31) France

Sport
- Sport: Athletics
- Events: Sprinting (100 meters, 200 meters)
- Club: Knockrea AC; Queens College, Cork

James Patrick Roche (1886 – 7 June 1917) was an Irish athlete who competed at the 1908 Summer Olympics.

== Biography ==
Roche was born in Cork, son of Stephen and Elsie Roche. He was later brought up at Cahirciveen, County Kerry.

Roche represented Great Britain at the 1908 Summer Olympics in London. In the 100 metres, Roche won his first round heat with a time of 11.4 seconds to advance to the semifinals. He finished third in his semifinal race, not advancing to the final. With a time of 22.8 seconds, Roche won his preliminary heat of the 200 metres. In that event, he had slightly better success in the semifinals but still lost to countryman George Hawkins. Hawkins edged out Roche for the win (and the right to advance to the final); both were timed at 22.6 seconds.

He was killed in action in France during World War I. He had been awarded the Military Cross, and at the time of his death was serving as a Captain in the 47th Trench Mortar Battery of the Royal Field Artillery. He was buried at Kemmel Chateau Military Cemetery.

== See also ==
- List of Olympians killed in World War I
