= John George (athlete) =

British sprinter (1882–1962)

Personal information
- Born: 26 April 1882 Croydon, London, England
- Died: 26 November 1962 (aged 80) Purley, London, England

Sport
- Sport: Athletics
- Event: Sprints
- Club: South London Harriers

John Phelps George (26 April 1882 – 26 November 1962) was a British athlete. He competed at the 1908 Summer Olympics in London.

== Biography ==
George born in Croydon, London, finished second behind Wyndham Halswelle in the 440 yards event at the 1906 AAA Championships. The following year he became the National 220 yards champion after winning the AAA Championships title at the 1907 AAA Championships.

At the 1908 Olympic Games, George won the second heat of the 100 metres with a time of 11 ^{3}/_{5} seconds, advancing to the semifinals. In the fourth semifinal, George placed last to drop out of further contention.

He also won his heat of the 200 metres, advancing to the semifinals with a time of 23.4 seconds. His third-place finish in his semifinal race kept him from advancing in that event as well.

George died in Purley, London.

== Sources ==
- profile
- Cook, Theodore Andrea (1908). The Fourth Olympiad, Being the Official Report. London: British Olympic Association.
- De Wael, Herman (2001). "Athletics 1908". Herman's Full Olympians. Archived from the original on 27 September 2006.
- Wudarski, Pawel (1999). "Wyniki Igrzysk Olimpijskich" (in Polish). Archived from the original on 16 February 2009.
