= George Hawkins (athlete) =

British athlete (1883–1917)

Personal information
- Nationality: British (English)
- Born: 15 October 1883 Tottenham, London, England
- Died: 22 September 1917 (aged 33) Ypres, West Vlaanderen, belgium

Sport
- Sport: Athletics
- Event: Sprints
- Club: Polytechnic Harriers

George Albert Hawkins (15 October 1883 – 22 September 1917) was a British athlete who competed in the 1908 Summer Olympics in London.

== Biography ==
Hawkins was born in Tottenham, London and was a surprise selection for Great Britain at the 1908 Summer Olympics because he failed to make the 1908 AAA Championships final.

Coached by Sam Mussabini (portrayed in the film Chariots of Fire), Hawkins ran in the 200 metres at the London Games. Hawkins ran the first round race in 22.8 seconds to beat two other runners and advance to the semifinals. There, he won again, this time finishing in 22.6 seconds. This qualified him for the final, where he finished fourth out of four finalists, running 22.9 seconds. The winner's time was 22.6, a time he had achieved in the semifinal.

Hawkins was killed in action, aged 33, during World War I, serving as a gunner with the Royal Garrison Artillery during the Third Battle of Ypres. He was buried in the Bard Cottage Cemetery nearby.

He had five children with Violet Freeman, with whom he was married.

== See also ==
- List of Olympians killed in World War I

== Sources ==
- Cook, Theodore Andrea (1908). The Fourth Olympiad, Being the Official Report. London: British Olympic Association.
- De Wael, Herman (2001). "Athletics 1908". Herman's Full Olympians. Archived from the original on 27 September 2006.
- Wudarski, Pawel (1999). "Wyniki Igrzysk Olimpijskich" (in Polish). Archived from the original on 16 February 2009.
