= Harold Huff =

American athlete (1880–1964)

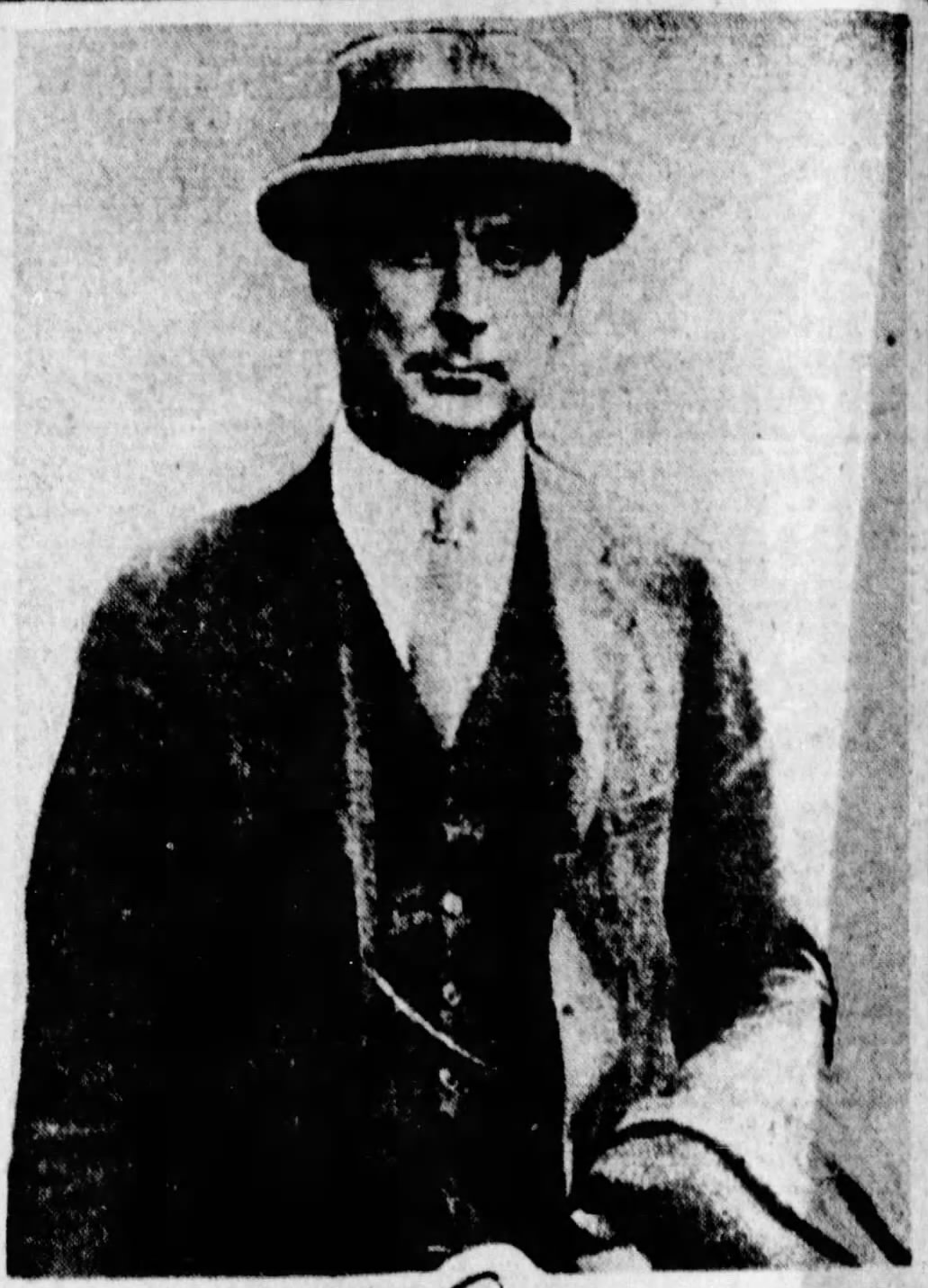
Huff in 1929

Harry J. "Doc" Huff (June 3, 1880 – May 29, 1964) was an American track and field athlete, coach, and college athletics administrator. He competed at the 1908 Summer Olympics in London. Huff served as the athletic director and head track and field coach at Grinnell College in Grinnell, Iowa from 1914 to 1926. He was the head track and field coach at the University of Kansas from 1926 to 1929 and the University of Missouri from 1929 to 1935.

Huff was born in Cedar Township, Van Buren County, Iowa to James K Polk Huff and Eleanor Virginia née: Sheldon Huff, and died in Kansas City, Missouri.

In the 100 metres, Huff won his first round heat with a time of 11.4 seconds, one of the slower winning times. He dropped his time to 11.1 seconds in his semifinal race to finish second behind eventual silver medallist James Rector, who tied the Olympic record at 10.8 seconds. Huff also won his preliminary heat in the 200 metres with a time of 22.8 seconds. He came in last in his three-man semifinal race, running the distance in 23.0 seconds.

== Sources ==
- Evans, Hilary; Gjerde, Arild; Heijmans, Jeroen; Mallon, Bill; et al. "Harry Huff". Olympics at Sports-Reference.com. Sports Reference LLC. Archived from the original on April 17, 2020.
- Cook, Theodore Andrea (1908). The Fourth Olympiad, Being the Official Report. London: British Olympic Association.
- De Wael, Herman (2001). "Athletics 1908". Herman's Full Olympians. Archived from the original on September 27, 2006.
- Wudarski, Pawel (1999). "Wyniki Igrzysk Olimpijskich" (in Polish). Archived from the original on February 16, 2009.
