= Louis Sebert (sprinter) =

Canadian athlete (1886–1942)

Louis Joseph Sebert (December 4, 1886 – December 2, 1942) was a Canadian athlete. He competed at the 1908 Summer Olympics in London.

In the 100 metres, Sebert took second place in his first round heat with a time of 11.7 seconds. He did not advance to the semifinals. His result in the 200 metres was similar. He placed second in his preliminary heat with a time of 22.8 seconds to not advance further.

Sebert finally won a preliminary heat in the 400 metres. His time of 50.2 seconds put him first among the three men in his heat. He dropped his time to 49.5 seconds for the semifinal but placed second behind William Robbins.

Sebert died on December 2, 1942, two days shy of his 56th birthday.

== Sources ==
- Cook, Theodore Andrea (1908). The Fourth Olympiad, Being the Official Report. London: British Olympic Association.
- De Wael, Herman (2001). "Athletics 1908". Herman's Full Olympians.
- Wudarski, Pawel (1999). "Wyniki Igrzysk Olimpijskich" (in Polish).
