= Noel Hamiel =

American politician

Member of the South Dakota House of Representatives from the 20th district
- In office 2009–2010

Personal details
- Born: December 24, 1947 (age 78) Chamberlain, South Dakota
- Party: Republican
- Spouse: Janet
- Children: three
- Profession: publisher/reporter

Noel L. Hamiel (born December 24, 1947) is an American former politician. He served as a Republican member for the 20th district in the South Dakota House of Representatives from 2009 to 2010. He was a career newspaperman who was elected to the South Dakota Newspaper Hall of Fame in 2012.
