= Robert Kerr (athlete) =

Canadian athlete (1882–1963)

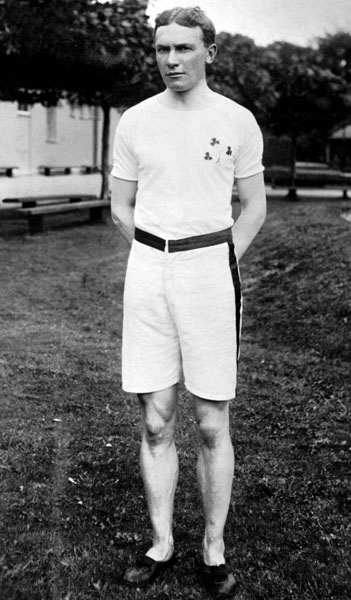

Personal information
- Born: June 9, 1882 Enniskillen, Ireland
- Died: May 12, 1963 (aged 80) Hamilton, Ontario, Canada

Sport
- Sport: Athletics
- Event: Sprints
- Club: West End Pleasure Club, Hamilton
Medal record
Men's athletics
Representing Canada
Olympic Games
Gold medal – first place	1908 London	200 metres
Bronze medal – third place	1908 London	100 metres

Robert Kerr (June 9, 1882 – May 12, 1963) was an Irish Canadian sprinter. He won the gold medal in the 200 metres and the bronze medal in the 100 metres at the 1908 Summer Olympics.

== Biography ==
Kerr was born in Enniskillen, County Fermanagh, Ireland. His family immigrated to Canada when he was five, eventually settling in Hamilton, Ontario. While working as a fireman, Kerr also enjoyed running in his spare time. He soon became the best regional sprinter, and in 1904 he used his savings to travel to Saint Louis, United States and compete in the 1904 Summer Olympics. There, he was eliminated in the heats of all three events he entered (60 metres, 100 metres and 200 metres).

However, Kerr's performances got better, and he set Canadian records in all sprint distances between 40 and 220 yards. He won Canadian titles in the 100 yards (1907) and 200 yards (1906 to 1908). In 1908, Kerr travelled to England, where he competed in the 1908 AAA Championships, winning both the 100 and 200 yards.

At the 1908 Summer Olympics, held in London, Kerr was considered to be somewhat of a home favourite by the crowd, as they saw him as a representative of the British Empire. He greatly improved on his Olympic performances of 1904, placing for the final of the 100 and 200 metres. In the 100 metres, he finished in third (behind South Africa's Reggie Walker and the United States' James Rector) with a time of 11.0 seconds. In the final of the 200 metres, held the next day, Kerr crossed the line first with a time of 22.6 seconds. News of his victory set off celebrations in his home town Hamilton.

During the First World War, Kerr became an officer with the 205th (Tiger) Battalion, CEF, which was also known as the Sportsmen's Battalion because many of its members were prominent local athletes. When that unit was disbanded, he was transferred to the 164th (Halton and Dufferin) Battalion, CEF and eventually was assigned to the Canadian Machine Gun Corps (misnamed the 1st Tank Battalion, CEF]).

In the 1920s, Kerr coached the track and field club at the Hamilton YMCA, including future Olympians Philip Granville and David Griffin. Kerr remained active in sports. He coached the athletics and football teams of Hamilton, and was an official at the 1928 and 1932 Summer Olympics. In 1928, he witnessed Percy Williams succeeding him as Canadian winner of the 200 metres. Furthermore, he was involved in the Canadian Olympic Association, and helped organize the 1930 British Empire Games in Hamilton.

Kerr died in Hamilton, aged 80. A park in his home town was named in his honour.

== Sources ==
- Cook, Theodore Andrea (1908). The Fourth Olympiad, Being the Official Report. London: British Olympic Association.
- De Wael, Herman (2001). "Athletics 1908". Herman's Full Olympians. Archived from the original on 27 September 2006.
- Wudarski, Pawel (1999). "Wyniki Igrzysk Olimpijskich" (in Polish).
