= Georges Malfait =

French sprinter (1878–1946)

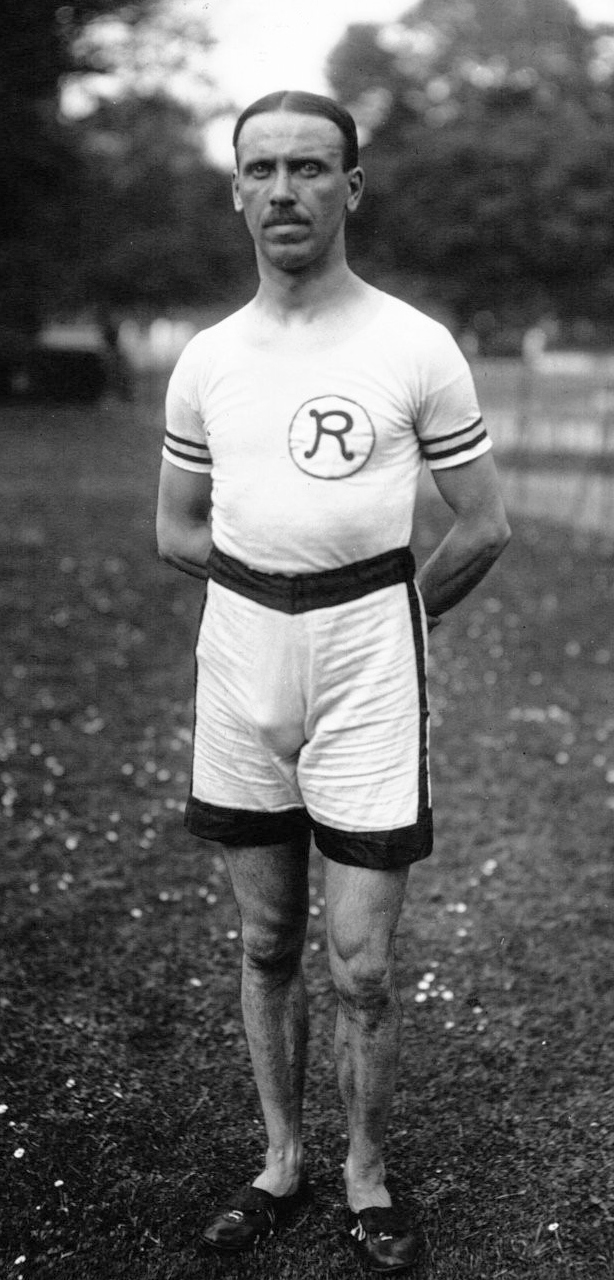
- Malfait in 1912

Personal information
- Born: 9 December 1878 Roubaix, France
- Died: 7 December 1946 (aged 67) Roubaix, France
- Height: 169 cm (5 ft 7 in)
- Weight: 60 kg (132 lb)

Sport
- Sport: Athletics
- Event: Sprint
- Club: RC Roubaix

Achievements and titles
- Personal best(s): 100 m – 10.6 (1905); 200 m – 22.6 (1908); 400 – 50.0 (1908)

Georges Désiré "Géo" Malfait (9 December 1878 – 7 December 1946) was a French sprinter. He competed in 100–400 m events at the 1906, 1908 and 1912 Summer Olympics, but failed to reach the finals. Malfait won the national titles in 100 m in 1904 and 1905 and 400 m in 1905.

Malfait finished second behind Wyndham Halswelle in the 440 yards event at the 1905 AAA Championships.
