= Reggie Walker (sprinter) =

South African athlete (1889–1951)

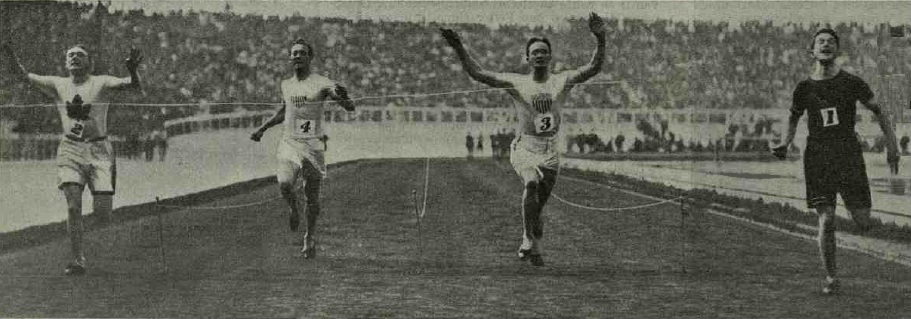
- London 1908 Olympics-Walker wins 100 metres

Personal information
- Born: Reginald Edgar Walker; 16 March 1889 Durban, Natal
- Died: 5 November 1951 (aged 62) Durban, Natal
Medal record
Men's athletics
Representing South Africa
Olympic Games
Gold medal – first place	1908 London	100 metres

Reginald Edgar Walker (16 March 1889 in Durban – 5 November 1951) was a South African athlete and the 1908 Olympic champion in the 100 metres.

== Biography ==
Born in the Colony of Natal, Walker, the 1907 South African Champion, was not among the big favourites for the 100 metres at the 1908 Summer Olympics. He even had trouble getting to London, as he lacked the necessary finances until a Natal sportswriter collected funds to support Walker's travel. In England, he was coached by Sam Mussabini, later also the coach of Harold Abrahams.

Several of the big names did not qualify for the final, but Walker did. His first round was a relatively easy victory run in 11.0 seconds. In the second round, Walker edged out William W. May of the United States while tying the Olympic record of 10.8 seconds. This qualified him for the final. There he competed against three North Americans, including James Rector of the United States, who had equalled the Olympic record in both of the qualifier rounds. Walker beat Rector in the final by about a foot and half, again equaling the Olympic record in 10.8 seconds.

Walker was still the youngest winner of the Olympic 100 metres as of 2021 (at 19 years and 128 days).

During World War I, Walker served with the 7th Infantry in German South West Africa, before joining the South African Overseas Expeditionary Force in 1917, serving in France, during which time he received a gunshot wound to the head. Walker was discharged from the Army in 1919 and later worked as a clerk with Ropes & Mattings in Nairobi, Kenya Colony, before returning to South Africa.

== Sources ==
- Cook, Theodore Andrea (1908). The Fourth Olympiad, Being the Official Report. London: British Olympic Association.
- De Wael, Herman (2001). "Athletics 1908". Herman's Full Olympians. Archived from the original on 27 September 2006.
- Wudarski, Pawel (1999). "Wyniki Igrzysk Olimpijskich" (in Polish).
