= Lou Sebert =

American politician (1935–2025)

Member of the South Dakota House of Representatives from the 20th district
- In office 1999–2006

Personal details
- Born: December 17, 1935 Java, South Dakota, U.S.
- Died: July 27, 2025 (aged 89) Mitchell, South Dakota, U.S.
- Party: Republican
- Spouse: Carol
- Children: 6
- Profession: Manager

Louis A. Sebert (December 17, 1935 – July 27, 2025) was an American politician. He served in the South Dakota House of Representatives from 1999 to 2006.

Sebert died in Mitchell, South Dakota on July 27, 2025, at the age of 89.
