= James Rector =

American athlete

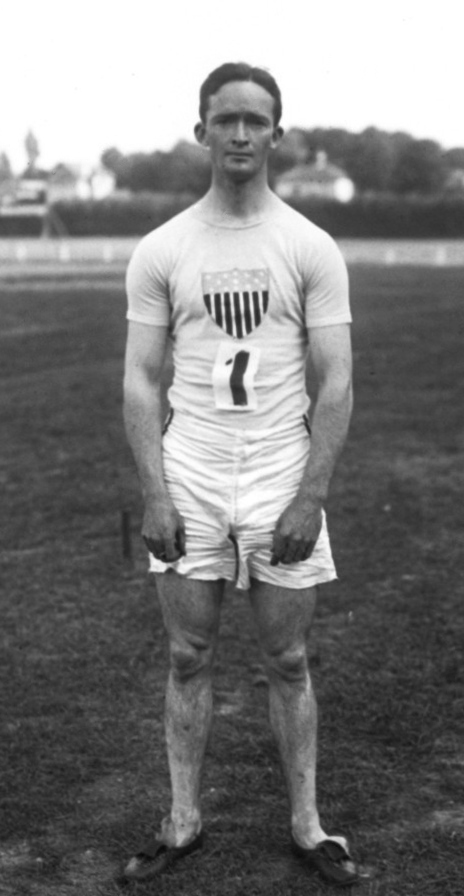

Medal record

Men's athletics

Representing the United States

Olympic Games
Silver medal – second place	1908 London	100 metres

John "James" Alcorn Rector (June 22, 1884 – March 10, 1949) was an American athlete. He was the first Arkansas-born athlete to compete in the Olympic Games. While competing he was a University of Virginia student and went there to train with Pop Lannigan.

James Rector was born in Hot Springs, Arkansas. He was the grandson of Arkansas Civil War governor Henry Massey Rector and Mississippi Reconstruction governor James Alcorn.

He won the silver medal in the 100 metres at the 1908 Summer Olympics, tying the Olympic record for the race (10.8 seconds at the time) during both the qualifying heats and the semifinals. He lost to Reggie Walker in the final, running the race in 10.9 seconds as Walker hit the 10.8 mark for his second time.

Rector was not only a track star at Virginia but also a star of the Virginia baseball and football teams. Rector was a prominent St. Louis, Missouri lawyer for more than thirty years before retiring in Hot Springs.

== Sources ==
- Cook, Theodore Andrea (1908). The Fourth Olympiad, Being the Official Report. London: British Olympic Association.
- De Wael, Herman (2001). "Athletics 1908". Herman's Full Olympians. Archived from the original on September 27, 2006.
- Wudarski, Pawel (1999). "Wyniki Igrzysk Olimpijskich" (in Polish). Archived from the original on October 14, 2008.
