= John W. Morton (runner) =

British athlete (1879–1950)

John Morton
Personal information
- Born: 13 February 1879 Handsworth, West Midlands, England
- Died: 5 September 1950 (aged 71) Brighton, England

Sport
- Sport: Athletics
- Event: Sprints
- Club: South London Harriers

John William Morton (13 February 1879 – 5 September 1950) was a British athlete who competed at the 1908 Summer Olympics in London.

== Biography ==
Morton, born in Handsworth, West Midlands became the National 100 yards champion after winning the AAA Championships title at the 1904 AAA Championships. He would go on to win the title for four consecutive years from 1904 to 1907, in addition to being the highest placed British athlete at the 1908 AAA Championships.

He competed in the 100 metres event at the 1908 Olympic Games. Morton won his first round heat with a time of 11.2 seconds to advance to the semifinals. There, he placed third and last in his race, not advancing to the final.

Morton placed second in his preliminary heat of the 200 metres with a time of 23.1 seconds. He did not advance to the semifinals.

In 1910, Morton was the editor for "How to Run 100 Yards" issued by Spalding Athletic Library.

== Sources ==
- profile
- Cook, Theodore Andrea (1908). The Fourth Olympiad, Being the Official Report. London: British Olympic Association.
- De Wael, Herman (2001). "Athletics 1908". Herman's Full Olympians. Archived from the original on 27 September 2006.
- Wudarski, Pawel (1999). "Wyniki Igrzysk Olimpijskich" (in Polish). Archived from the original on 16 February 2009.
