= Athletics at the 1908 Summer Olympics – Men's long jump =

Men's long jump at the Games of the IV Olympiad
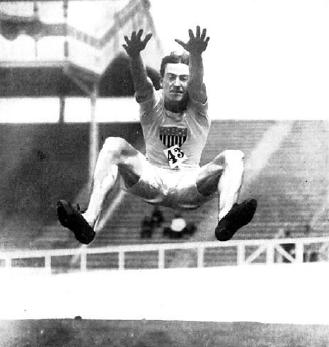
- Frank Irons
- Venue: White City Stadium
- Date: July 22, 1908
- Competitors: 32 from 9 nations
- Winning distance: 7.48 OR

Medalists
1st place, gold medalist(s)		Frank Irons; United States
2nd place, silver medalist(s)		Daniel Kelly; United States
3rd place, bronze medalist(s)		Calvin Bricker; Canada

The men's long jump was one of six jumping events on the Athletics at the 1908 Summer Olympics programme in London. The competition was held on July 22, 1908. Thirty-two athletes from 9 nations competed. NOCs could enter up to 12 athletes. The event was won by Frank Irons of the United States, the nation's fourth consecutive victory in the first four Olympic Games. Calvin Bricker of Canada took bronze to break up the Americans' attempt at another sweep (which they had accomplished in 1896 and 1904).

== Background ==
This was the fourth appearance of the event, which is one of 12 athletics events to have been held at every Summer Olympics. None of the jumpers from 1904 returned. The world's best jumpers, American Myer Prinstein and Irishman Peter O'Connor, had retired; there was no favorite coming into the event.

Canada, the Netherlands, and Norway each made their first appearance in the event. The United States appeared for the fourth time, the only nation to have long jumpers at each of the Games so far.

== Competition format ==
The 1908 format returned to the two-round format used in 1900. Only the top three jumpers in the qualifying round advanced to the final. Each jumper had three jumps in the qualifying round; finalists received an additional three jumps, with qualifying round jumps still counting if the final jumps were not better.

== Records ==
These are the standing world and Olympic records (in metres) prior to the 1908 Summer Olympics.

World record	Peter O'Connor (GBR)	7.61	Dublin, United Kingdom of Great Britain and Ireland	5 August 1901
Olympic record	Myer Prinstein (USA)	7.34	St. Louis, United States	1 September 1904

Frank Irons set two Olympic records. At first he jumped 7.44 metres and finally he set the new Olympic record with 7.48 metres.

== Schedule ==
Date	Time	Round
Wednesday, 22 July 1908	10:30	Qualifying; Final

== Results ==
All jumpers performed three jumps. The best three made another three attempts to improve their marks. Best marks are known for the top twenty jumpers, but no information about marks or placement for the bottom twelve.

Rank	Athlete	Nation	Distance			Notes
Rank	Athlete	Nation	Qualifier	Final	Best	Notes
1st place, gold medalist(s)	Frank Irons	United States	7.44	7.48	7.48	OR
2nd place, silver medalist(s)	Daniel Kelly	United States	7.09	Unknown	7.09	
3rd place, bronze medalist(s)	Calvin Bricker	Canada	7.08	Unknown	7.08	
4	Edward Cook	United States	6.97	Did not advance	6.97	
5	John Brennan	United States	6.86	Did not advance	6.86	
6	Frank Mount Pleasant	United States	6.82	Did not advance	6.82	
7	Albert Weinstein	Germany	6.77	Did not advance	6.77	
8	Tim Ahearne	Great Britain	6.72	Did not advance	6.72	
9	Denis Murray	Great Britain	6.71	Did not advance	6.71	
10	Gunnar Rönström	Sweden	6.66	Did not advance	6.66	
11	Charles Williams	Great Britain	6.65	Did not advance	6.65	
12	Sam Bellah	United States	6.64	Did not advance	6.64	
13	Frank Lukeman	Canada	6.59	Did not advance	6.59	
14	Ödön Holits	Hungary	6.54	Did not advance	6.54	
15	Arthur Hoffmann	Germany	6.50	Did not advance	6.50	
16	Alfred Bellerby	Great Britain	6.44	Did not advance	6.44	
17	Wilfred Bleaden	Great Britain	6.43	Did not advance	6.43	
18	Willie Watt	Great Britain	6.42	Did not advance	6.42	
19	George Barber	Canada	6.41	Did not advance	6.41	
20	Carl Silfverstrand	Sweden	6.34	Did not advance	6.34	
21–32	Hermann von Bönninghausen	Germany	Unknown	Did not advance	Unknown	
21–32	Lionel Cornish	Great Britain	Unknown	Did not advance	Unknown	
21–32	Géza Kövesdi	Hungary	Unknown	Did not advance	Unknown	
21–32	Bram Evers	Netherlands	Unknown	Did not advance	Unknown	
21–32	Henri Gutierrez	France	Unknown	Did not advance	Unknown	
21–32	Jacobus Hoogveld	Netherlands	Unknown	Did not advance	Unknown	
21–32	Garfield MacDonald	Canada	Unknown	Did not advance	Unknown	
21–32	James O'Connell	United States	Unknown	Did not advance	Unknown	
21–32	Henry Olsen	Norway	Unknown	Did not advance	Unknown	
21–32	Arvid Ringstrand	Sweden	Unknown	Did not advance	Unknown	
21–32	Ludwig Uettwiller	Germany	6.05	Did not advance	6.05	
21–32	Hugo Wieslander	Sweden	Unknown	Did not advance	Unknown	
—	Platt Adams	United States	DNS			
—	Géo André	France	DNS			
—	Carl Bechler	Germany	DNS			
—	Martin Brustmann	Germany	DNS			
—	István Czurgay	Hungary	DNS			
—	Cyril Dugmore	Great Britain	DNS			
—	Karl Fryksdahl	Sweden	DNS			
—	Alex Gordon	Great Britain	DNS			
—	Oswald Groenings	Great Britain	DNS			
—	Juho Halme	Finland	DNS			
—	Ernest Hutcheon	Australasia	DNS			
—	Evert Koops	Netherlands	DNS			
—	Nándor Kovács	Hungary	DNS			
—	Gustav Krojer	Austria	DNS			
—	Sven Låftman	Sweden	DNS			
—	Karl Lampelmayer	Austria	DNS			
—	Edvard Larsen	Norway	DNS			
—	Con Leahy	Great Britain	DNS			
—	Jeremiah Mahoney	United States	DNS			
—	Erik Majunko	Hungary	DNS			
—	Gaston Martens	Belgium	DNS			
—	Henri Meslot	France	DNS			
—	Robert Pascarel	France	DNS			
—	Armas Pesonen	Finland	DNS			
—	Uuno Railo	Finland	DNS			
—	Ede Rökk	Hungary	DNS			
—	Ted Savage	Canada	DNS			
—	Nate Sherman	United States	DNS			
—	István Somodi	Hungary	DNS			
—	E. Steiner	France	DNS			
—	Ragnar Stenberg	Finland	DNS			
—	Knut Stenborg	Sweden	DNS			
—	Ben Stephenson	United States	DNS			
—	Doug Stupart	South Africa	DNS			
—	Kálmán Szathmáry	Hungary	DNS			
—	Andor Szende	Hungary	DNS			
—	Gaspare Torretta	Italy	DNS			
—	Sandór Veres	Hungary	DNS			
—	Julius Wagner	Switzerland	DNS			
—	F. Young	United States	DNS			

== Sources ==
- Official Report of the Games of the IV Olympiad (1908).
- De Wael, Herman. Herman's Full Olympians: "Athletics 1908". Accessed 7 April 2006. Available electronically at.
