= Athletics at the 1912 Summer Olympics – Men's standing long jump =

Olympic athletics event

Men's standing long jump at the Games of the V Olympiad
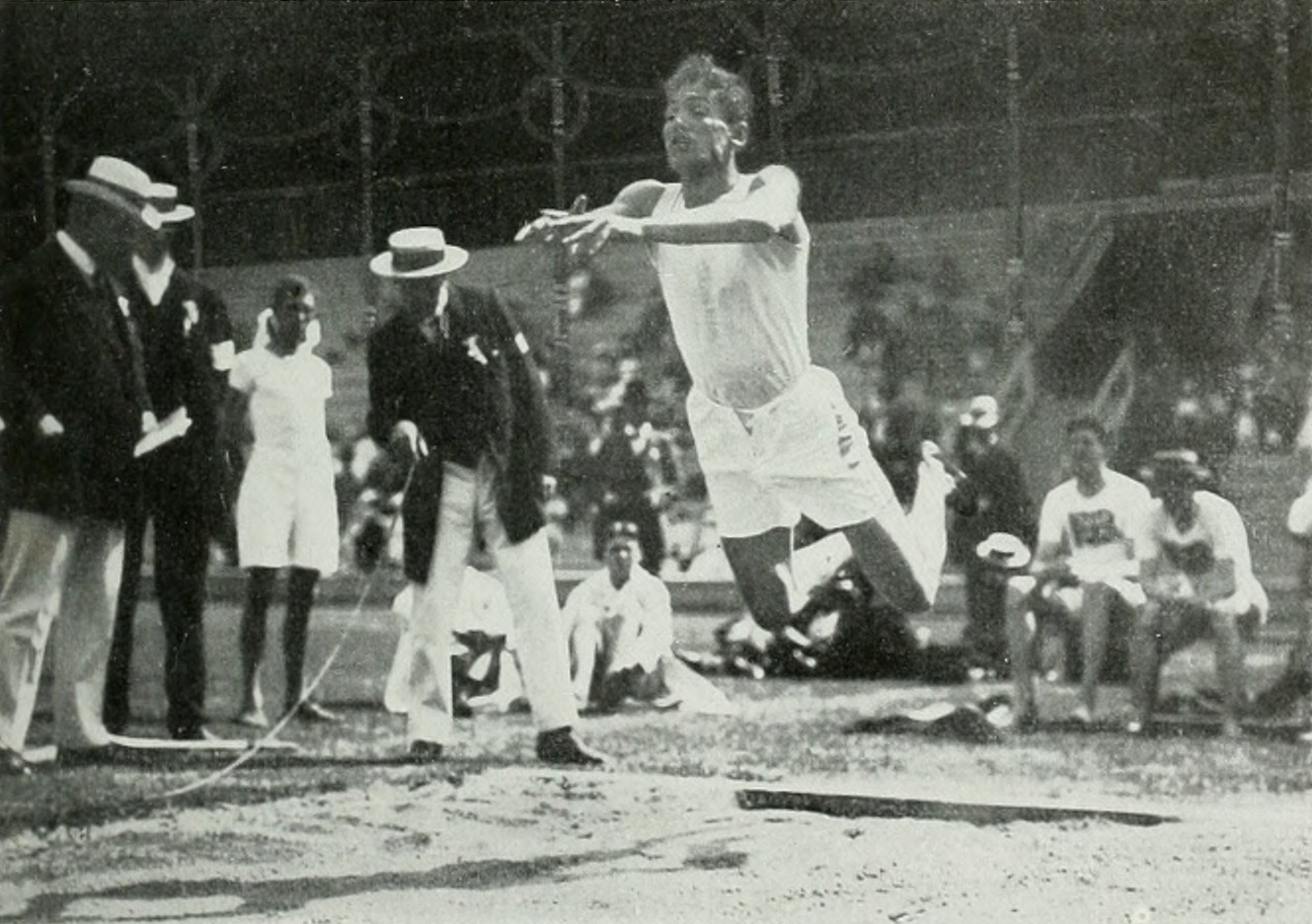
- Tsiklitiras on the way to win the gold medal.
- Venue: Stockholm Olympic Stadium
- Date: July 8, 1912
- Competitors: 19 from 8 nations
- Winning distance: 3.37

Medalists
1st place, gold medalist(s)		Konstantinos Tsiklitiras; Greece
2nd place, silver medalist(s)		Platt Adams; United States
3rd place, bronze medalist(s)		Benjamin Adams; United States

The men's standing long jump was a track and field athletics event held as part of the Athletics at the 1912 Summer Olympics programme. It was the fourth and final appearance of the event. The competition was held on Monday, July 8, 1912. Nineteen long jumpers from eight nations competed. NOCs could enter up to 12 athletes. Ray Ewry, who was the three-time defending champion in the event, did not compete in 1912. The silver medalist from 1908, Konstantinos Tsiklitiras, won the event. Platt Adams, the sixth-place finisher four years earlier, took second. Benjamin Adams finished third. Each of the three standing long jump medalists also medaled in the standing high jump, though in a different order.

The winning margin was 1 cm which was the only time the men's standing long jump was won by less than 9 cm at the Olympics.

== Background ==
This was the fourth and final appearance of the event, which was held four times from 1900 to 1912. Three of the top seven finishers (places behind that are not known) from the 1908 Games returned: silver medalist Konstantinos Tsiklitiras of Greece, fifth-place finisher Ragnar Ekberg of Sweden, and sixth-place finisher Platt Adams of the United States. The man who had won all three of the previous competitions (four if the 1906 Intercalated Games are counted), American Ray Ewry, did not compete.

Hungary and Norway each made their debut in the event. The United States made its fourth appearance, the only nation to have competed in all three editions of the standing long jump to that point.

== Competition format ==
The competition was described as two rounds at the time, but was more similar to the modern divided final. All athletes received three jumps initially. The top three after that received an additional three jumps to improve their distance, but the initial jumps would still count if no improvement was made.

== Records ==
These were the standing world and Olympic records (in metres) prior to the 1912 Summer Olympics.

World record	Ray Ewry (USA)	3.47	St. Louis, United States	3 September 1904
Olympic record	Ray Ewry (USA)	3.47	St. Louis, United States	3 September 1904

No new world or Olympic records were set during the competition.

== Schedule ==
Date	Time	Round
Monday, 8 July 1912	10:30	Qualifying; Final

== Results ==
Rank	Athlete	Nation	1	2	3	4	5	6	Distance
1st place, gold medalist(s)	Konstantinos Tsiklitiras	Greece	3.14	3.26	3.37	3.30	3.24	3.34	3.37
2nd place, silver medalist(s)	Platt Adams	United States	3.23	3.18	3.32	3.36	3.34	3.24	3.36
3rd place, bronze medalist(s)	Benjamin Adams	United States	3.28	3.21	3.24	3.18	3.23	3.28	3.28
4	Gustaf Malmsten	Sweden	3.11	3.20	3.12	Did not advance			3.20
5	Leo Goehring	United States	X	3.14	3.13	Did not advance			3.14
5	Edvard Möller	Sweden	3.13	3.14	3.09	Did not advance			3.14
7	András Baronyi	Hungary	3.12	3.13	3.02	Did not advance			3.13
8	Richard Byrd	United States	3.12	3.11	3.05	Did not advance			3.12
9	Forest Fletcher	United States	3.05	3.11	3.09	Did not advance			3.11
10	Alfred Motté	France	3.10	3.10	3.09	Did not advance			3.10
11	Gustaf Ljunggren	Sweden	3.01	3.04	3.09	Did not advance			3.09
12	Birger Brodtkorb	Norway	3.00	3.05	3.03	Did not advance			3.05
13	Ragnar Ekberg	Sweden	3.00	3.02	3.03	Did not advance			3.03
14	Géo André	France	3.02	2.96	X	Did not advance			3.02
14	Henry Ashington	Great Britain	2.95	2.79	3.02	Did not advance			3.02
14	Douglas Melin	Sweden	3.02	3.01	2.99	Did not advance			3.02
17	Arthur Maranda	Canada	2.80	2.83	2.98	Did not advance			2.98
18	Karl Bergh	Sweden	2.86	2.95	2.91	Did not advance			2.95
19	Philip Kingsford	Great Britain	2.60	2.75	2.72	Did not advance			2.75

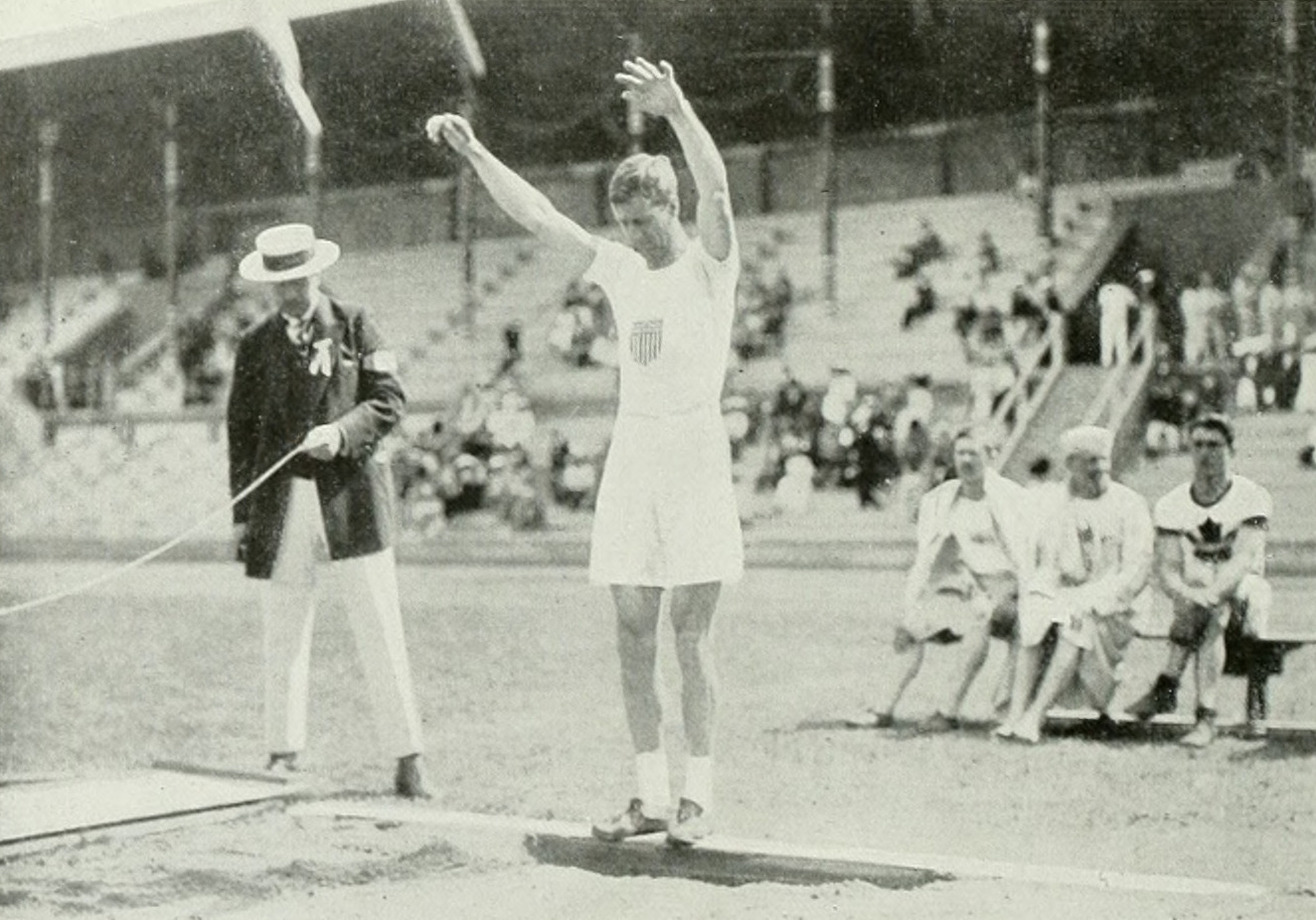
Platt Adams winning the silver medal.

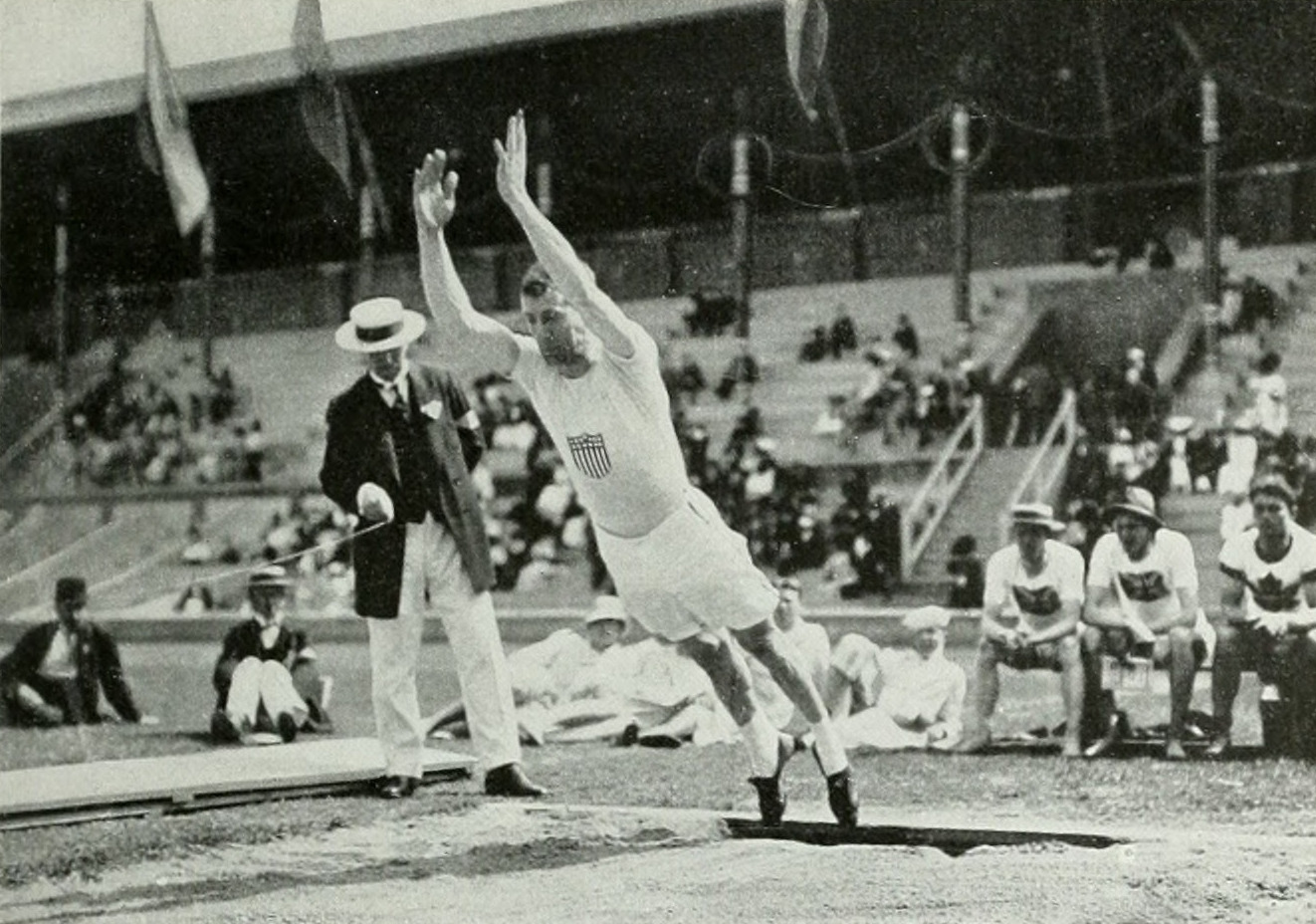
Platt Adams in action.

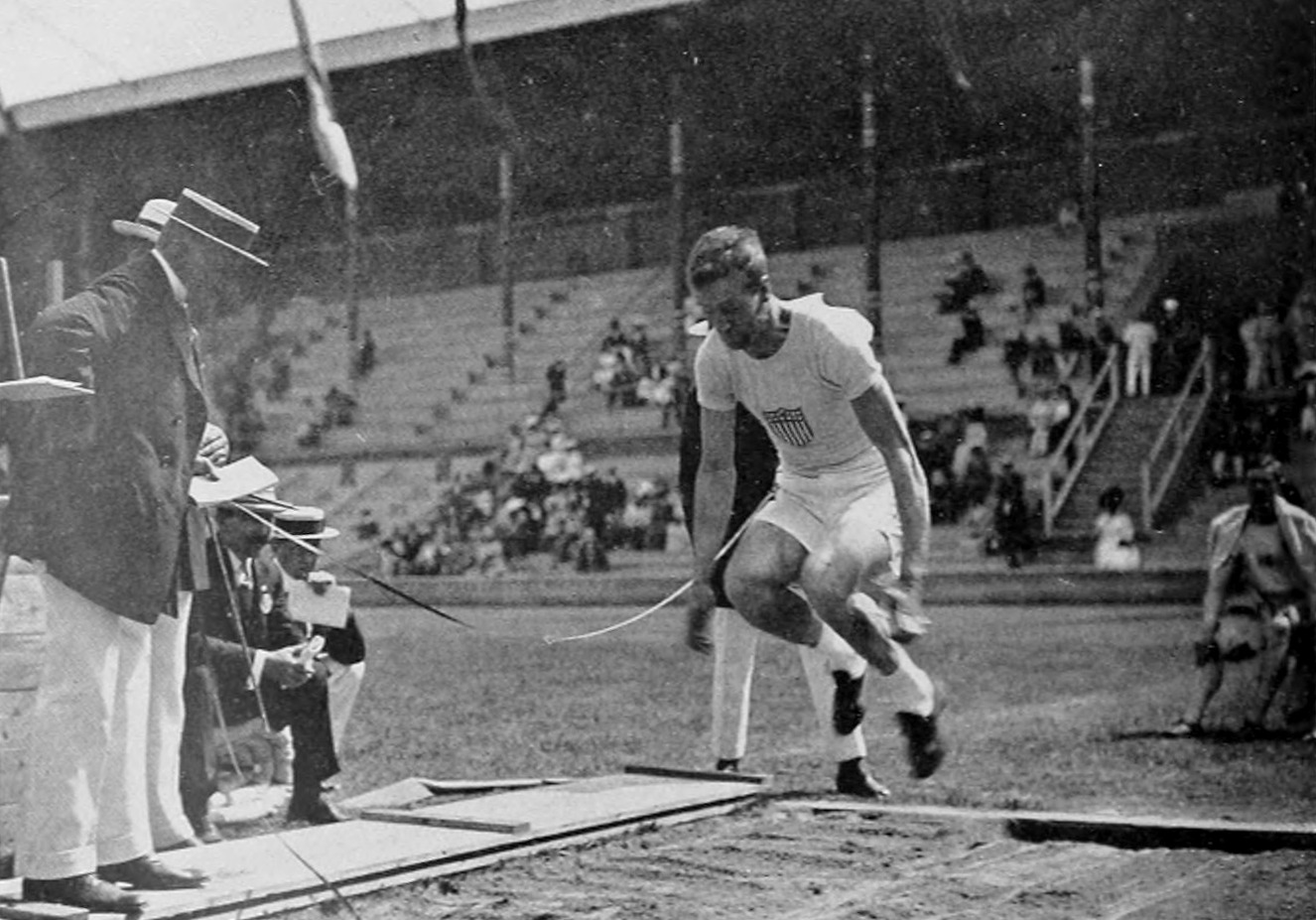
Bronze medalist Benjamin Adams.

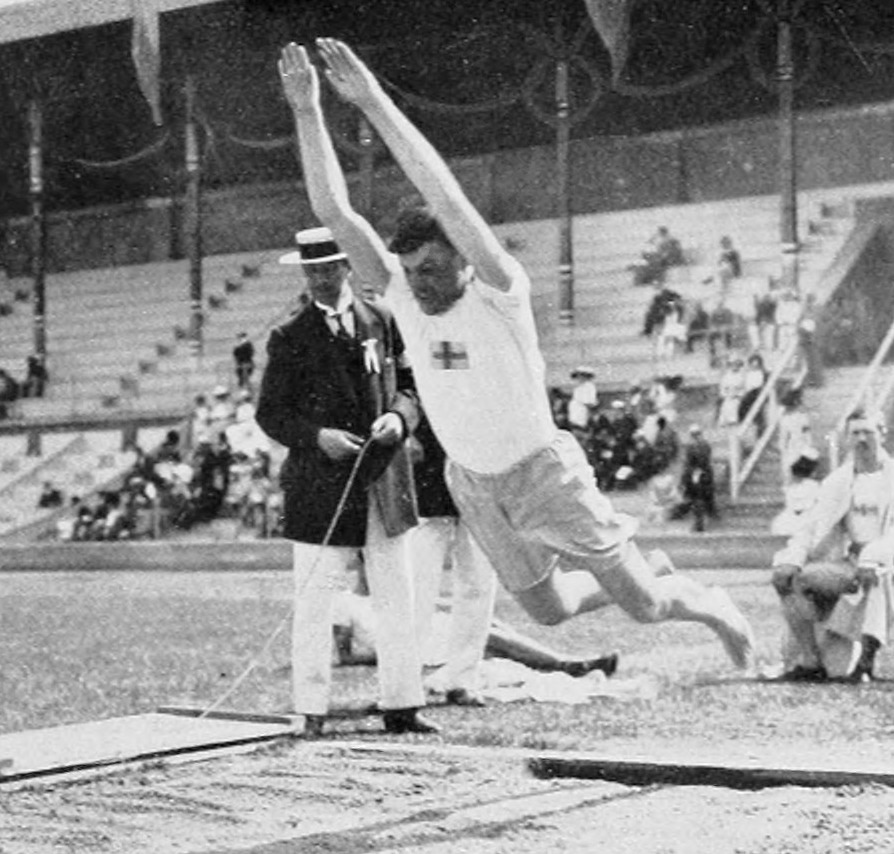
Gustaf Malmsten finishing fourth.
