= Athletics at the 1908 Summer Olympics – Men's triple jump =

Men's triple jump at the Games of the IV Olympiad
- Athletics pictogram
- Venue: White City Stadium
- Date: 25 July 1908
- Competitors: 20 from 8 nations
- Winning distance: 14.92 OR

Medalists
1st place, gold medalist(s)		Tim Ahearne; Great Britain
2nd place, silver medalist(s)		Garfield MacDonald; Canada
3rd place, bronze medalist(s)		Edvard Larsen; Norway

The men's triple jump was one of six jumping events on the Athletics at the 1908 Summer Olympics programme in London. The competition was held on 25 July 1908. Twenty athletes from eight nations competed. NOCs could enter up to 12 athletes. The event was won by Tim Ahearne of Great Britain, breaking a streak of three American victories in the triple jump. All three medal-winning nations were on the podium for the first time.

== Background ==
This was the fourth appearance of the event, which is one of 12 athletics events to have been held at every Summer Olympics. No athletes from the 1904 Games returned. The triple jump was still "rarely contested at national meets in this era" and once again there was no favorite in the Olympic event.

Canada, Finland, Norway, and South Africa each made their first appearance in the event. The United States competed for the fourth time, having competed at each of the Games so far.

== Competition format ==
The competition was described as two rounds at the time, but was more similar to the modern divided final. All athletes received three jumps initially. The top three after that received an additional three jumps to improve their distance, but the initial jumps would still count if no improvement was made. The jump format was codified: "The competitor shall first land upon the same foot with which he shall have taken off. The reverse foot shall be used for the second landing, and both feet shall be used for the third landing."

== Records ==
These are the standing world and Olympic records (in metres) prior to the 1908 Summer Olympics.

World record	John Breshnihan (GBR)	15.35(*)	Bandon, United Kingdom of Great Britain and Ireland	26 August 1906
Olympic record	Myer Prinstein (USA)	14.47	Paris, France	16 July 1900

(*) unofficial

At first Tim Ahearne set a new Olympic record with 14.72 metres. Then Garfield MacDonald improved the record to 14.76 metres and finally Ahearne took the new Olympic record with 14.92 metres.

== Schedule ==
Date	Time	Round
Saturday, 25 July 1908	10:00	Qualifying; Final

== Results ==
All jumpers performed three jumps. The best three made another three attempts to improve their marks. Best marks are known for the top seventeen jumpers, but no information about marks or placement for the bottom three.

Rank	Athlete	Nation	Qualifying	Final	Notes
1st place, gold medalist(s)	Tim Ahearne	Great Britain	14.72	14.92	OR
2nd place, silver medalist(s)	Garfield MacDonald	Canada	14.12	14.76	
3rd place, bronze medalist(s)	Edvard Larsen	Norway	14.37	14.39	
4	Calvin Bricker	Canada	14.10	Did not advance	
5	Platt Adams	United States	14.07	Did not advance	
6	Frank Mount Pleasant	United States	13.97	Did not advance	
7	Karl Fryksdal	Sweden	13.65	Did not advance	
8	John Brennan	United States	13.59	Did not advance	
9	Martin Sheridan	United States	13.42	Did not advance	
10	Doug Stupart	South Africa	13.40	Did not advance	
11	Cyril Dugmore	Great Britain	13.31	Did not advance	
12	Michael Dineen	Great Britain	13.23	Did not advance	
13	Henry Olsen	Norway	13.17	Did not advance	
14	Oscar Guttormsen	Norway	13.16	Did not advance	
15	Dimitrios Muller	Greece	13.09	Did not advance	
16	Frank Irons	United States	12.67	Did not advance	
17	Sam Bellah	United States	12.55	Did not advance	
18–20	Nathaniel Sherman	United States	Unknown	Did not advance	
18–20	George Mayberry	Great Britain	Unknown	Did not advance	
18–20	Juho Halme	Finland	Unknown	Did not advance	
—	21 nonstarters	Various	DNS	Did not advance	

== Sources ==
- Official Report of the Games of the IV Olympiad (1908).
- De Wael, Herman. Herman's Full Olympians: "Athletics 1908". Accessed 7 April 2006. Available electronically at.
