= Athletics at the 1908 Summer Olympics – Men's standing long jump =

Olympic athletics event

Men's standing long jump at the Games of the IV Olympiad
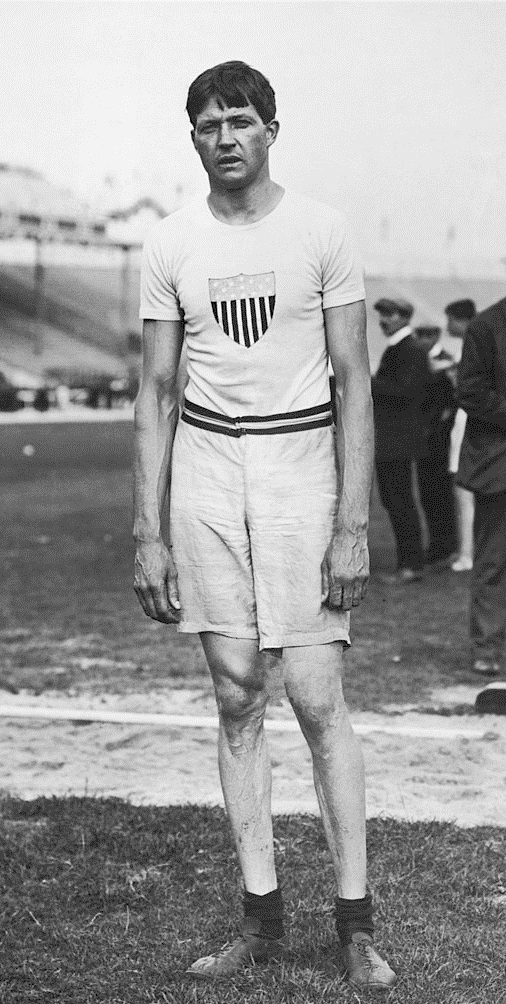
- Ray Ewry
- Venue: White City Stadium
- Date: July 20, 1908
- Competitors: 25 from 11 nations
- Winning distance: 3.33

Medalists
1st place, gold medalist(s)		Ray Ewry; United States
2nd place, silver medalist(s)		Konstantinos Tsiklitiras; Greece
3rd place, bronze medalist(s)		Martin Sheridan; United States

The men's standing long jump was one of six jumping events on the athletics at the 1908 Summer Olympics programme in London. The competition was held on Monday, July 20, 1908. Twenty-five long jumpers from eleven nations competed. NOCs could enter up to 12 athletes. The event was won by Ray Ewry of the United States, his third consecutive victory in the event. Ewry won all eight standing jump events from 1900 to 1908 as well as both events at the 1906 Intercalated Games. Konstantinos Tsiklitiras of Greece took silver. American Martin Sheridan earned bronze.

== Background ==
This was the third appearance of the event, which was held four times from 1900 to 1912. American Ray Ewry returned as the two-time defending Olympic champion and world record holder; he was heavily favored in this as well as all the standing jumps. Also returning from the 1904 competition was fellow American and bronze medalist John Biller.

Belgium, Canada, Denmark, Finland, Germany, Great Britain, Greece, the Netherlands, and Sweden each made their debut in the event. The United States made its third appearance, the only nation to have competed in all three editions of the standing long jump to that point.

== Competition format ==
The 1908 format introduced the two-round format. Only the top three jumpers in the qualifying round advanced to the final. Each jumper had three jumps in the qualifying round; finalists received an additional three jumps, with qualifying round jumps still counting if the final jumps were not better.

== Records ==
These were the standing world and Olympic records (in metres) prior to the 1908 Summer Olympics.

World record	Ray Ewry (USA)	3.47	St. Louis, United States	3 September 1904
Olympic record	Ray Ewry (USA)	3.47	St. Louis, United States	3 September 1904

== Schedule ==
Date	Time	Round
Wednesday, 22 July 1908		Qualifying; Final

== Results ==
Rank	Athlete	Nation	Distance		
Rank	Athlete	Nation	Qualifying	Final	Best
1st place, gold medalist(s)	Ray Ewry	United States	3.32	3.33	3.33
2nd place, silver medalist(s)	Konstantinos Tsiklitiras	Greece	3.235	3.22	3.235
3rd place, bronze medalist(s)	Martin Sheridan	United States	3.23	3.22	3.23
4	John Biller	United States	3.21	Did not advance	3.21
5	Ragnar Ekberg	Sweden	3.19	Did not advance	3.19
6	Platt Adams	United States	3.11	Did not advance	3.11
6	Frank Holmes	United States	3.11	Did not advance	3.11
8–25	Tim Ahearne	Great Britain	Unknown	Did not advance	Unknown
8–25	George Barber	Canada	Unknown	Did not advance	Unknown
8–25	Wilfred Bleaden	Great Britain	Unknown	Did not advance	Unknown
8–25	Lionel Cornish	Great Britain	Unknown	Did not advance	Unknown
8–25	Léon Dupont	Belgium	Unknown	Did not advance	Unknown
8–25	Bram Evers	Netherlands	Unknown	Did not advance	Unknown
8–25	Walter Henderson	Great Britain	Unknown	Did not advance	Unknown
8–25	Jacobus Hoogveld	Netherlands	Unknown	Did not advance	Unknown
8–25	Frank Irons	United States	Unknown	Did not advance	Unknown
8–25	Jarl Jakobsson	Finland	Unknown	Did not advance	Unknown
8–25	Henri Jardin	France	Unknown	Did not advance	Unknown
8–25	Frederick Kitching	Great Britain	Unknown	Did not advance	Unknown
8–25	Evert Koops	Netherlands	Unknown	Did not advance	Unknown
8–25	Svend Langkjær	Denmark	Unknown	Did not advance	Unknown
8–25	Arthur Mallwitz	Germany	Unknown	Did not advance	Unknown
8–25	Alfred Motté	France	Unknown	Did not advance	Unknown
8–25	Sigmund Muenz	United States	Unknown	Did not advance	Unknown
8–25	Lancelot Stafford	Great Britain	Unknown	Did not advance	Unknown

== Sources ==
- Official Report of the Games of the IV Olympiad (1908).
- De Wael, Herman. Herman's Full Olympians: "Athletics 1908". Accessed 7 April 2006. Available electronically at.
