= Athletics at the 1912 Summer Olympics – Men's standing high jump =

Olympic athletics event

Men's standing high jump at the Games of the V Olympiad
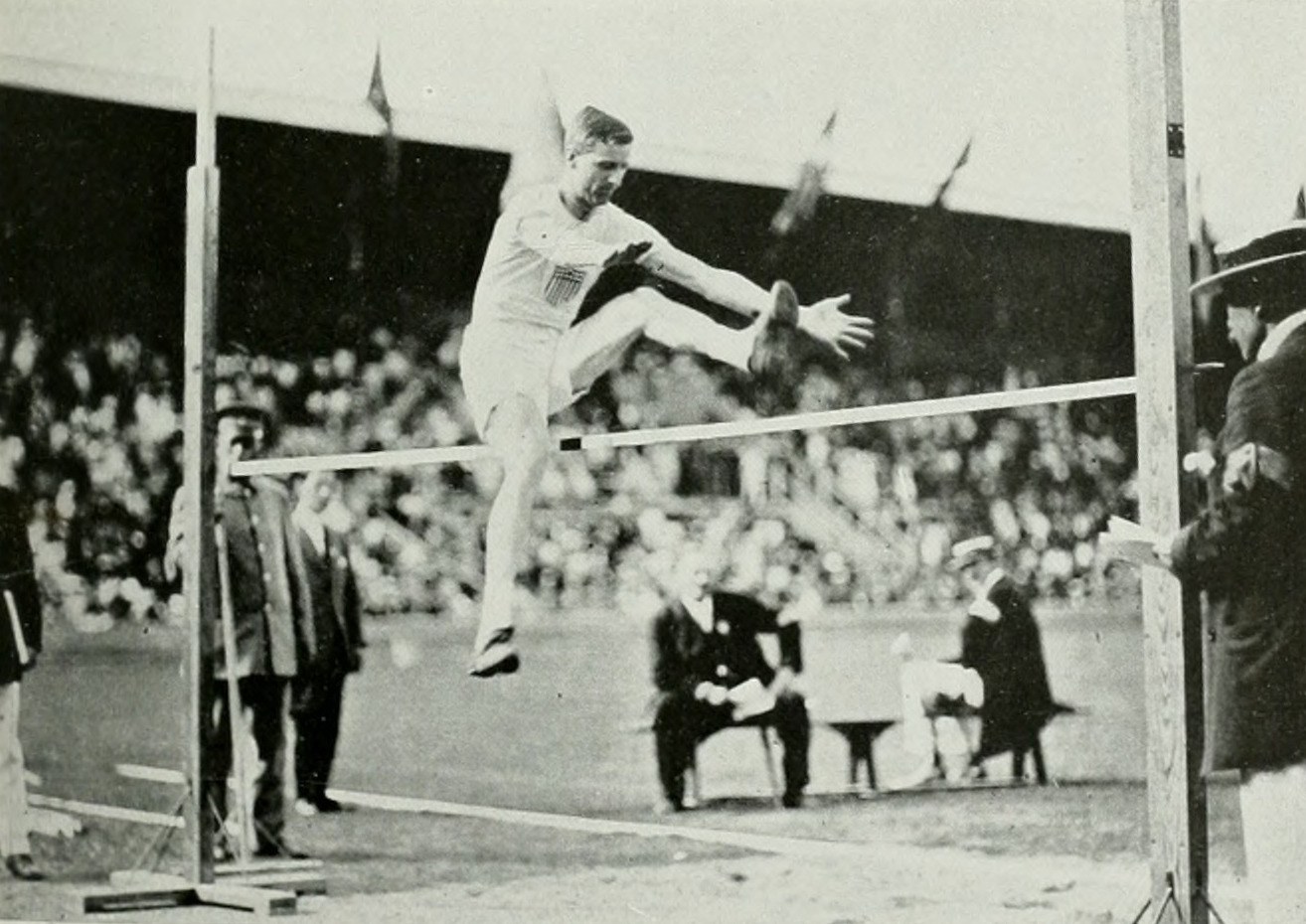
- Platt Adams on the way to win the gold medal.
- Venue: Stockholm Olympic Stadium
- Date: July 13, 1912
- Competitors: 17 from 9 nations
- Winning height: 1.63

Medalists
1st place, gold medalist(s)		Platt Adams; United States
2nd place, silver medalist(s)		Benjamin Adams; United States
3rd place, bronze medalist(s)		Konstantinos Tsiklitiras; Greece

The men's standing high jump was a track and field athletics event held as part of the athletics at the 1912 Summer Olympics programme. It was the fourth and final appearance of the event. The competition was held on Saturday, July 13, 1912.

Ray Ewry, who was the three-time defending champion in the event, did not compete in 1912. The silver medalist from 1908, Konstantinos Tsiklitiras, took bronze. Platt Adams, the fifth-place finisher four years earlier, won the event. Benjamin Adams finished second. It was the second time in Olympic history that brothers had finished first and second in an event, after the Paine brothers in the 1896 military pistol shooting event. Each of the three standing high jump medalists also medaled in the standing long jump, though in a different order.

Seventeen high jumpers from nine nations competed. NOCs could enter up to 12 athletes.

== Background ==
This was the fourth and final appearance of the event, which was held four times from 1900 to 1912. Three-time defending champion (four-time if the 1906 Intercalated Games are counted) Ray Ewry of the United States had retired, leaving the competition relatively open. Returning competitors from the 1908 Games were silver medalist Konstantinos Tsiklitiras of Greece and fifth-place finishers Platt Adams of the United States and Géo André of France.

Chile and Russia each made their debut in the event. The United States made its fourth appearance, the only nation to have competed in each appearance of the event.

== Competition format ==
For the first time, there were two distinct rounds of jumping with results cleared between rounds (the 1908 Games had featured a two-round event but the results from the qualifying round then carried over to the final). All jumpers clearing 1.50 metres in the qualifying round advanced to the final.

== Records ==
These were the standing world and Olympic records (in metres) prior to the 1912 Summer Olympics.

World record	Ray Ewry (USA)	1.655 m	Paris, France	16 July 1900
Olympic record	Ray Ewry (USA)	1.655 m	Paris, France	16 July 1900

No new world or Olympic records were set during the competition.

== Schedule ==
Date	Time	Round
Saturday, 13 July 1912	9:30; 16:00	Qualifying; Final

== Results ==
Key

- o = Height cleared
- x = Height failed
- – = Height passed
- r = Retired
- SB = Season's best
- PB = Personal best
- NR = National record
- AR = Area record
- OR = Olympic record
- WR = World record
- WL = World lead
- NM = No mark
- DNS = Did not start
- DQ = Disqualified

=== Qualifying ===
Rank	Athlete	Nation	1.30	1.35	1.40	1.45	1.48	1.50	Height	Notes
1	Benjamin Adams	United States	o	o	o	o	—	o	1.50	Q
1	Platt Adams	United States	o	o	o	o	o	o	1.50	Q
1	Konstantinos Tsiklitiras	Greece	o	o	o	o	—	o	1.50	Q
1	Edvard Möller	Sweden	o	o	o	o	—	o	1.50	Q
5	Leo Goehring	United States	o	o	o	xxo	—	xo	1.50	Q
6	Richard Byrd	United States	o	o	o	o	—	xxo	1.50	Q
7	Forest Fletcher	United States	o	o	o	o	—	xxx	1.45	
7	Rudolf Smedmark	Sweden	o	o	o	o	—	xxx	1.45	
7	Frank Belote	United States	o	o	xxo	o	—	xxx	1.45	
7	Géo André	France	—	o	xo	xo	—	xxx	1.45	
7	Leif Ekman	Sweden	o	o	o	xxo	—	xxx	1.45	
7	Karl Bergh	Sweden	o	o	o	xxo	xxx	—N/a	1.45	
13	Rodolfo Hammersley	Chile	o	o	o	xxx	—N/a		1.40	
13	Alfred Schwarz	Russian Empire	o	o	o	xxx	—N/a		1.40	
13	Birger Brodtkorb	Norway	xo	xo	xo	xxx	—N/a		1.40	
16	Benjamin Howard Baker	Great Britain	xo	o	xxx	—N/a			1.35	
17	Andor Horvag	Hungary	—	xxx	—N/a				NM	

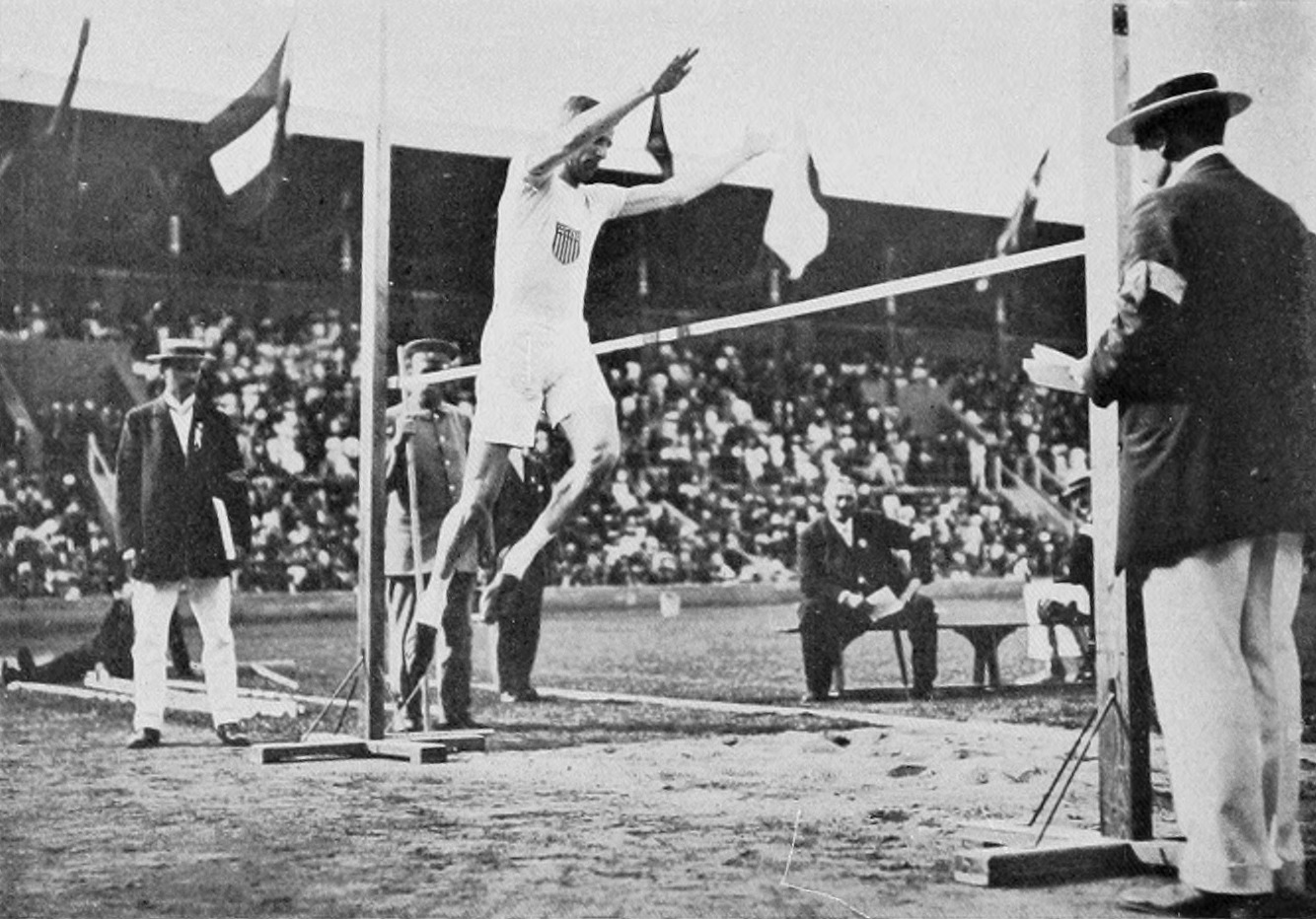
Platt Adams in action.

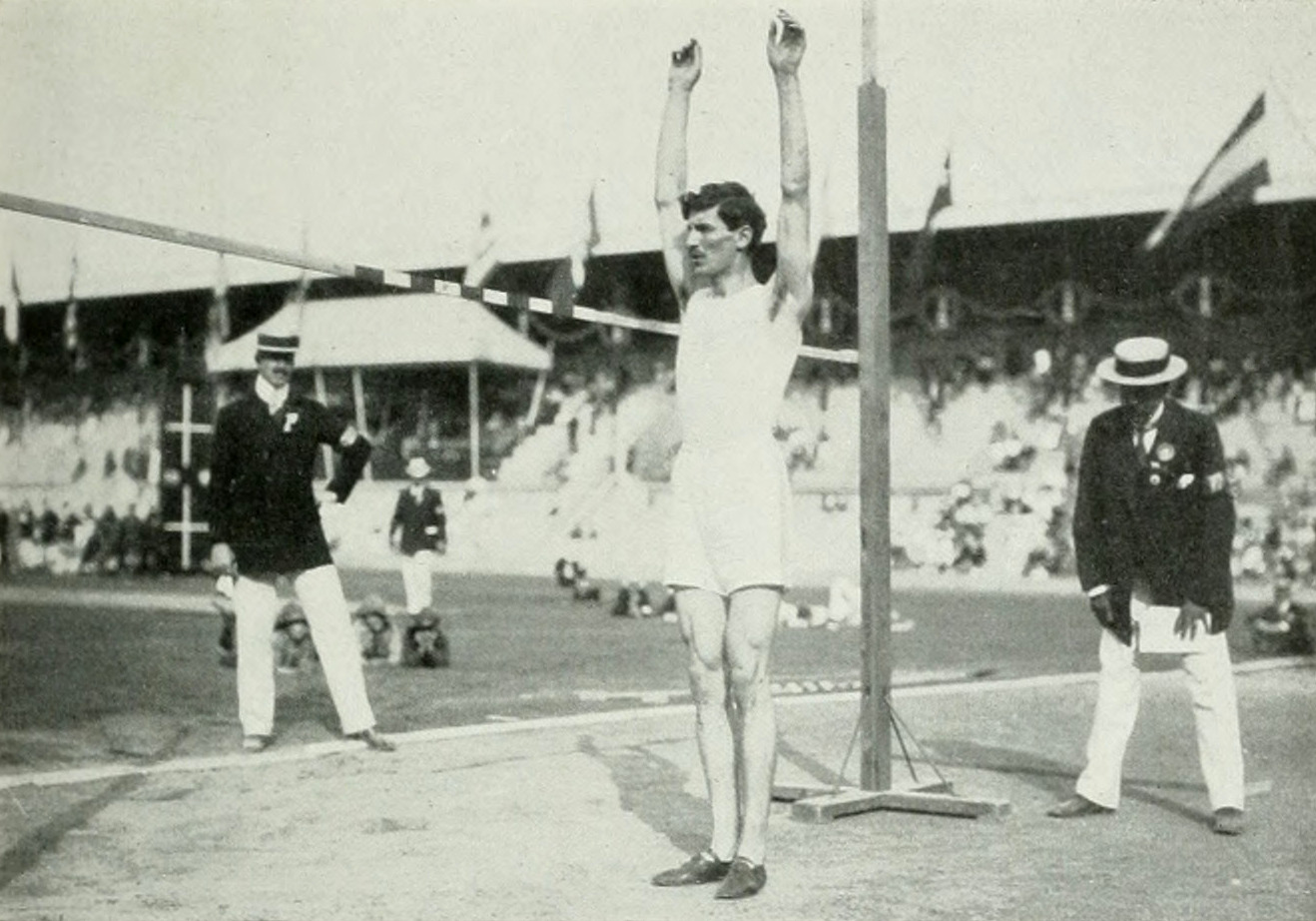
Bronze medalist Konstantinos Tsiklitiras.

=== Final ===
Rank	Athlete	Nation	1.30	1.40	1.45	1.50	1.55	1.60	1.63	1.66	Height
1st place, gold medalist(s)	Platt Adams	United States	o	o	o	o	o	xo	o	xxx	1.63
2nd place, silver medalist(s)	Benjamin Adams	United States	o	o	o	o	o	o	xxx	—N/a	1.60
3rd place, bronze medalist(s)	Konstantinos Tsiklitiras	Greece	o	o	o	xo	xo	xxx	—N/a		1.55
4	Edvard Möller	Sweden	o	o	o	o	xxx	—N/a			1.50
4	Leo Goehring	United States	o	xo	o	o	xxx	—N/a			1.50
4	Richard Byrd	United States	o	o	o	xo	xxx	—N/a			1.50
