= Wilfred Bleaden =

British athlete

Personal information
- Nationality: British (Scottish)
- Born: 6 March 1887 Aberdeen, Scotland
- Died: 30 August 1965 (aged 78) Westminster, London

Sport
- Sport: Athletics
- Event: long jump / shot put
- Club: University of Oxford AC; Achilles Club

Wilfred Harry Bleaden (6 March 1887 – 30 August 1965) was a British and Scottish track and field athlete who competed at the 1908 Summer Olympics.

== Biography ==
Bleaden born Aberdeen, Scotland, was educated at Brasenose College, Oxford in the University of Oxford. In 1908 Bleaden won the Oxbridge Sports and then became the British long jump champion after winning the British AAA Championships title at the 1908 AAA Championships. In July 1908 he also represented Scotland in the match against Ireland, coming second to Tim Ahearne.

Shortly after the international, Bleaden represented the Great Britain team at the 1908 Olympic Games in London, finishing 17th in the men's long jump competition and failed to advance to the final of the standing long jump event.

Bleaden finished third behind Tim Ahearne and Sidney Abrahams at the 1909 AAA Championships.

Bleaden also competed in shot put, setting a personal best of 11.33 in 1911 and winning against Cambridge in 1909. He was also third behind Denis Horgan at the 1910 AAA Championships.

Bleaden served in the Royal Naval Volunteer Reserve during World War I and studied medicine qualifying as a surgeon in 1920.
