= Norman Patterson =

Norman Patterson is the name of:

- Norman Patterson (athlete) (1886–1961), American athlete
- Norman Patterson (soccer) (1945–2012), Canadian soccer player

== See also ==
- Norman McLeod Paterson (1883–1983), Canadian politician
