= William Watt (long jumper) =

Irish athlete (1886–1957)

Personal information
- Nationality: Irish
- Born: Q1 1886 Roscommon, Ireland
- Died: 25 October 1957 (aged 71) Roscommon, Ireland

Sport
- Sport: Athletics
- Event: Long jump
- Club: Social Club, Irish AAA

William Cullen Watt (Q1 1886 – 25 October 1957) was an Irish athlete who competed in the 1908 Summer Olympics.

== Biography ==
Watt was born in Roscommon, Ireland and was the son of a Scottish-born plumber. In 1902, he enlisted in the Royal Horse Artillery.

In 1908 at the Irish Amateur Athletic Association Championships, Watt was runner-up behind Tim Ahearne and represented Ireland against Scotland in July 1908.

Watt represented the Great Britain team at the 1908 Olympic Games in London, where he participated in the men's long jump competition. In the event held on 22 July, Watt finished in 18th place with a jump of 6.42 metres.

Watt would become runner-up three more times at the Irish Amateur Athletic Association Championships, in 1909 behind Ahearne again, and in 1910 and 1911, behind Tom Maguire and Percy Kirwan respectively.

By trade he followed his father's profession and became a plumber, living locally in Abbey Street Lower, Roscommon, where he died in 1957.
