= Athletics at the 1908 Summer Olympics – Men's standing high jump =

Olympic athletics event

Men's standing high jump at the Games of the IV Olympiad
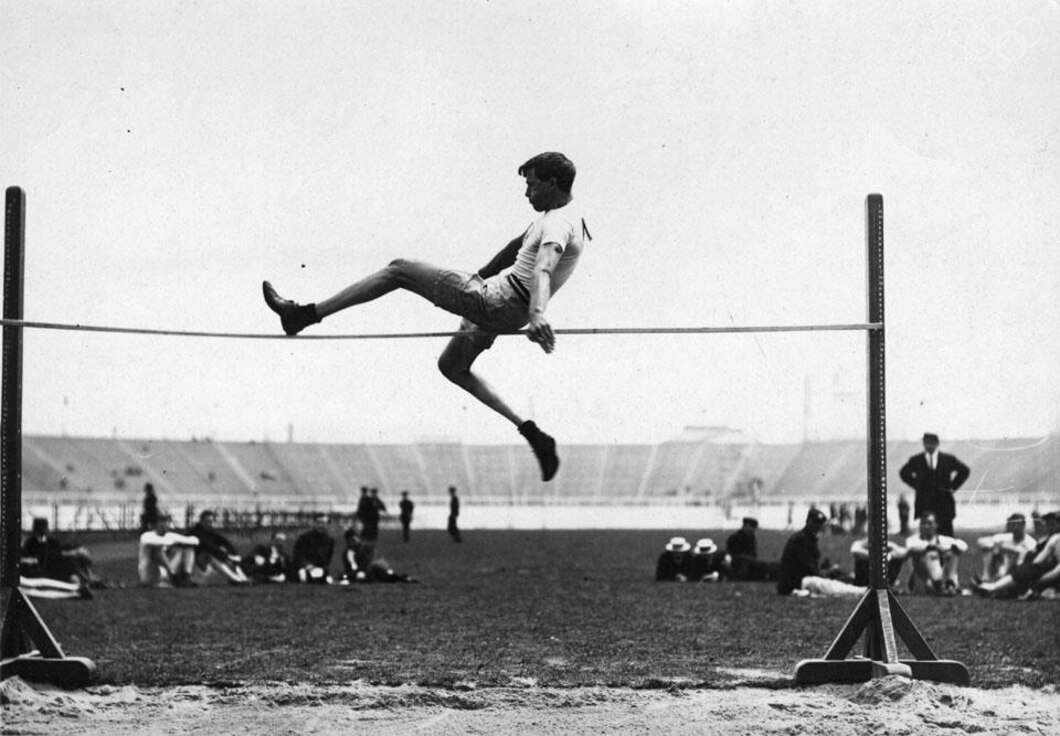
- Ray Ewry during standing high jump competition.
- Venue: White City Stadium
- Date: July 23, 1908
- Competitors: 23 from 11 nations
- Winning height: 1.57

Medalists
1st place, gold medalist(s)		Ray Ewry; United States
2nd place, silver medalist(s)		John Biller; United States
2nd place, silver medalist(s)		Konstantinos Tsiklitiras; Greece

The men's standing high jump was one of six jumping events on the athletics at the 1908 Summer Olympics programme in London. The competition was held on July 23, 1908. 23 high jumpers from eleven nations competed. NOCs could enter up to 12 athletes. The event was won by Ray Ewry of the United States, his third consecutive victory in the event. Ewry won all eight standing jump events from 1900 to 1908 as well as both events at the 1906 Intercalated Games. Konstantinos Tsiklitiras of Greece took silver, tying with American John Biller. Tsiklitiras was the first non-American to medal in the event; the United States had swept the medals in both 1900 and 1904.

== Background ==
This was the third appearance of the event, which was held four times from 1900 to 1912. Two-time defending champion (three-time if the 1906 Intercalated Games are counted) Ray Ewry of the United States was heavily favored.

Australasia, Belgium, Canada, Denmark, France, Germany, Great Britain, Greece, Norway, and Sweden each made their debut in the event. The United States made its third appearance, the only nation to have competed in each appearance of the event to that point.

== Competition format ==
There were two rounds of jumping, though the results from the qualifying round carried over to the final. The top four jumpers in the qualifying round advanced to the final. Each competitor received three attempts at each height. The judges determined the initial height of the bar and any increases. "Diving" and "somersaulting" were not allowed.

== Records ==
These were the standing world and Olympic records (in metres) prior to the 1908 Summer Olympics.

World record	Ray Ewry (USA)	1.655	Paris, France	16 July 1900
Olympic record	Ray Ewry (USA)	1.655	Paris, France	16 July 1900

No new world or Olympic records were set during the competition.

== Schedule ==
Date	Time	Round
Thursday, 23 July 1908		Qualifying; Final

== Results ==
Rank	Athlete	Nation	Height
1st place, gold medalist(s)	Ray Ewry	United States	1.57
2nd place, silver medalist(s)	John Biller	United States	1.55
2nd place, silver medalist(s)	Konstantinos Tsiklitiras	Greece	1.55
4	Frank Holmes	United States	1.52
5	Platt Adams	United States	1.47
5	Géo André	France	1.47
5	Alfred Motté	France	1.47
8	Wilhelm Blystad	Norway	1.42
8	Léon Dupont	Belgium	1.42
8	Walter Henderson	Great Britain	1.42
8	Frank Irons	United States	1.42
8	Svend Langkjær	Denmark	1.42
8	Arthur Mallwitz	Germany	1.42
14	Allan Bengtsson	Sweden	1.40
14	Karl Fryksdal	Sweden	1.40
16	Martin Sheridan	United States	1.37
17	Lancelot Stafford	Great Britain	1.32
17	Ludwig Uettwiller	Germany	1.32
19–23	George Barber	Canada	Unknown
19–23	Alfred Flaxman	Great Britain	Unknown
19–23	Ernest Hutcheon	Australasia	Unknown
19–23	Henri Jardin	France	Unknown
19–23	Lawson Robertson	United States	Unknown

== Sources ==
- Official Report of the Games of the IV Olympiad (1908).
- De Wael, Herman. Herman's Full Olympians: "Athletics 1908". Accessed 7 April 2006. Available electronically at.
