= Edvard Möller =

Swedish high and long jumper

Edvard Möller (Edvard Carl Möller 13 February 1888 – 23 June 1920) was a Swedish athlete who competed in the 1912 Summer Olympics. In 1912, he finished fifth in the standing long jump competition. He finished fourth in the standing high jump event.
