= Allan Bengtsson =

Swedish high jumper

Personal information
- Nationality: Swedish
- Born: 30 June 1889 Karlskrona, Sweden
- Died: 7 May 1955 (aged 65) Karlskrona, Sweden

Sport
- Sport: Athletics
- Event: High jump

Allan Bengtsson (30 June 1889 – 7 May 1955) was a Swedish athlete. He competed in the men's standing high jump at the 1908 Summer Olympics.
