= George Barber (jumper) =

Canadian long jumper

Personal information
- Born: 23 August 1884 Toronto, Ontario, Canada
- Died: 28 May 1938 (aged 53) Toronto, Ontario, Canada

Sport
- Sport: Athletics
- Events: Long jump High jump

George Henry Barber (23 August 1884 – 28 May 1938) was a Canadian athlete. He competed in four jumping events at the 1908 Summer Olympics.

Barber competed in both jumping and hurdling for the Central YMCA in Toronto during the early 1900s. At the 1908 Summer Olympics, Barber competed in the high jump, long jump, standing high jump, and standing long jump, but did not place in any event. Barber retired from high jumping the next year due to a prohibition on dericks being used during competitions.

During his sporting career, Barber was known as an all-around athlete and was described by reporters as a "good hop-step-and-jump artist". Outside of jumping, Barber also played rugby football for the Toronto Argonauts.
