= Wilhelm Blystad =

Norwegian high jumper and hurdler

Wilhelm Arnt Blystad (September 15, 1881 – July 4, 1954) was a Norwegian track and field athlete. He represented IK Tjalve.

Participating in the 1908 Summer Olympics, he first competed in the 110 metres hurdles but did not finish his heat and was eliminated. He then finished eighth in the standing high jump competition after clearing 1.42 metres. He became Norwegian champion in the 110 metres hurdles in 1904 and in the high jump in 1902.
