= Sam Bellah =

American track and field athlete

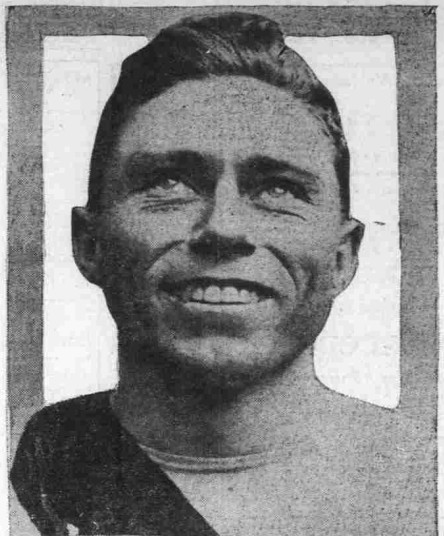
Bellah, circa 1918

Sam Bellah (Samuel Harrison Bellah; June 24, 1887 – January 9, 1963) was an American track and field athlete who competed in the 1908 Summer Olympics and in the 1912 Summer Olympics.

He was born in Metz, Monterey County, California and died in Oregon.

In 1908 he finished sixth in the pole vault competition, twelfth in the long jump event, and 17th in the triple jump competition.

Four years later he finished seventh in the pole vault event.

Bellah represented the Stanford Cardinal track and field team and San Francisco Olympic Club, and later Multnomah Athletic Club of Portland, Oregon. He was United States pole vault co-champion in 1911 and sole champion in 1915.
