= Walter McClure =

American athlete

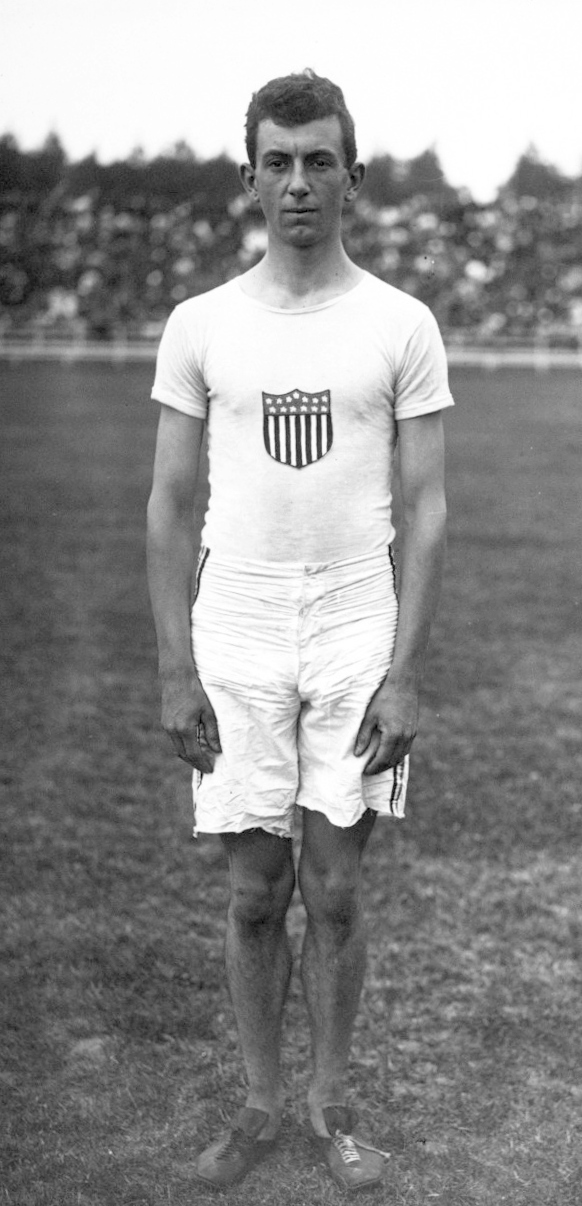
- Walter McClure in 1912

Personal information
- Born: August 24, 1892 Junction City, Oregon, United States
- Died: April 12, 1959 (aged 66) Portland, Oregon, United States
- Height: 1.80 m (5 ft 11 in)
- Weight: 66 kg (146 lb)

Sport
- Sport: Athletics
- Event: 400–5000 m
- Club: Multnomah AC, Portland; California Golden Bears, Berkeley

Achievements and titles
- Personal bests: 400 m – 49.7 (1913); 1500 m – 4:03.4 (1912)

Walter Rayburn McClure (August 24, 1892 – April 12, 1959) was an American middle-distance runner who competed at the 1912 Summer Olympics. He finished eighth in the 1500 m event and failed to reach the 800 m final. He also took part in the baseball event, which was held as demonstration sport.
