= Leif Ekman =

Swedish high jumper

Leif Ekman (January 16, 1893 – October 1, 1967) was a Swedish track and field athlete who competed in the 1912 Summer Olympics. He was born in Gothenburg and died in Råda, Västra Götaland County. In 1912, he finished seventh in the standing high jump event.
