= Ragnar Ekberg =

Swedish track and field athlete

Olle Ragnar B. Ekberg (12 August 1886, in Stockholm – 5 April 1966, in Saltsjöbaden, Sweden) was a Swedish track and field athlete who competed in the 1908 Summer Olympics and in the 1912 Summer Olympics.

In 1908, he finished fifth in the standing long jump competition. Four years later, he finished 13th in the standing long jump event. He also participated in the 100 metres competition but was eliminated in the first round.
