= Albert Weinstein =

German long jumper

Georg Albert Weinstein (October 13, 1885 – December 7, 1969) was a German track and field athlete who competed in the 1908 Summer Olympics. In 1908, he finished sixth, seventh, or possibly 8th in the long jump competition.
