= Henry Ashington =

English athlete

Personal information
- Born: 25 September 1891 Southport, England
- Died: 31 January 1917 (aged 25) near Combles, Somme, France

Sport
- Sport: Athletics
- Event: long jump / triple jump
- Club: University of Cambridge AC

Henry Sherard Osborn Ashington (25 September 1891 – 31 January 1917) was an English track and field athlete who competed in the 1912 Summer Olympics.

== Biography ==
Ashington was born in 1891 in Southport, Lancashire, the son of Sherard and Lydia Ashington. His father was a solicitor.

Ashington finished second behind Percy Kirwan in the long jump event at the 1912 AAA Championships.

Shortly after the 1912 AAA Championships, he finished tenth in the long jump competition and 15th in the standing long jump event at the 1912 Olympic Games in Stockholm, Sweden.

Ashington was killed in action, aged 25, during the First World War, serving as a captain with the East Yorkshire Regiment near Combles. He was buried in the Combles Communal Cemetery nearby.

== See also ==
- List of Olympians killed in World War I
