= Wesley Oler =

American baseball player (1891–1980)

Personal information
- Born: Wesley Marion Oler, Jr. December 15, 1891 Baltimore, Maryland, USA
- Died: April 5, 1980 (aged 88) Alexandria, Virginia, USA
- Education: Yale University

Sport
- Sport: Track and field, baseball

Wesley Marion Oler, Jr. (December 15, 1891 – April 5, 1980) was an American baseball player and track and field athlete who competed in the 1912 Summer Olympics.

== Biography ==
Oler was born in Baltimore, Maryland and died in Alexandria, Virginia. In 1912, he finished 13th in the high jump competition. He also competed in the exhibition baseball tournament in Stockholm. It was the first appearance of baseball at the Olympics, and Oler was one of four Americans who played for the Swedish team.

Oler won the British AAA Championships title in the high jump event at the 1914 AAA Championships.

While a student-athlete at Yale University, he was initiated into the 1916 class of the Skull and Bones Society.

After working at a brokerage, he joined General Motors in 1939 and retired as Director of Public Relations in 1956.
