= Arthur Mallwitz =

German long jumper

Personal information
- Nationality: British
- Born: 15 June 1880 Berlin, Germany
- Died: 20 May 1968 (aged 87) Bad Honnef, West Germany

Sport
- Sport: Athletics
- Events: High jump Long jump

Arthur Mallwitz (15 June 1880 – 20 May 1968) was a German athlete. He competed in the men's standing long jump and the men's standing high jump events at the 1908 Summer Olympics.
