= John Brennan (athlete) =

American track and field athlete

John Joseph Brennan (July 17, 1879 – February 21, 1964) was an American track and field athlete who competed in the 1908 Summer Olympics. He died in Wisconsin. In 1908 he finished fifth in the long jump event and eighth in the triple jump competition.
