= Henry Olsen =

Norwegian athlete (1887–1978)

Henry Martinus Olsen (March 11, 1887 – August 16, 1978) was a Norwegian track and field athlete who specialized in the jumping events. He represented Kristiania IF.

Participating at the 1908 Summer Olympics, he finished thirteenth in both high jump and triple jump. He also participated in the long jump competition but his result is unknown. Olsen became Norwegian champion, four times, in the events standing high jump twice and he won two titles in 1913, in the 110 hurles and in standing long jump. He came in second and third several times in the jumping events.

His strongest event by today's standards was the triple jump, in which his personal best was 13.82 metres, achieved in May 1908 in Kristiania.
