= Ben Adams (track and field) =

American athlete (1890–1961)

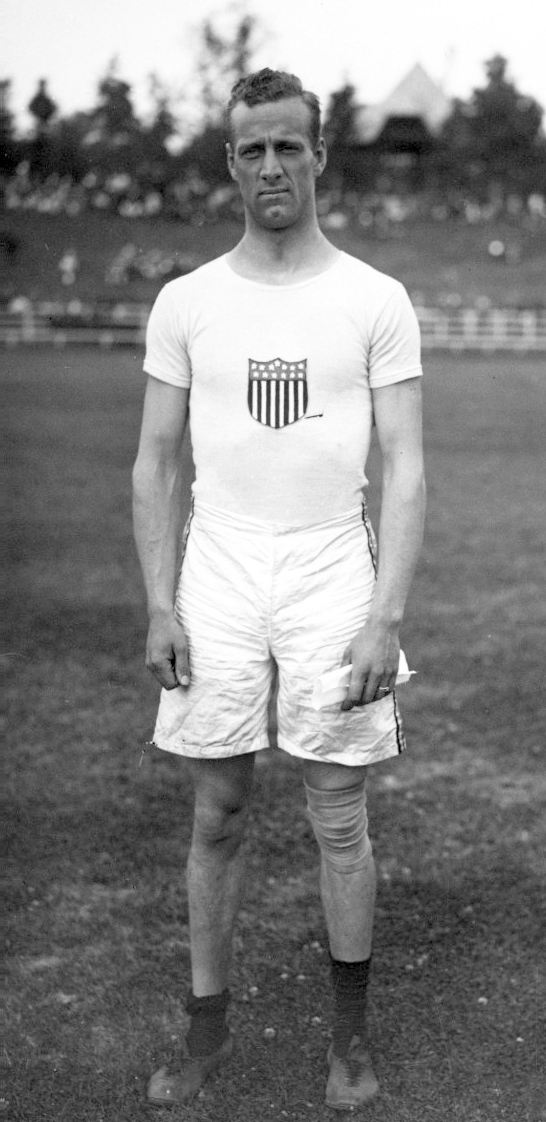
- Benjamin Adams in 1912

Personal information
- Born: March 31, 1890 Newark, New Jersey, United States
- Died: March 14, 1961 (aged 70) Neptune City, New Jersey, United States
- Height: 1.88 m (6 ft 2 in)
- Weight: 78 kg (172 lb)

Sport
- Sport: Athletics
- Event: Standing long/high jump
- Club: NYAC, New York
Medal record
Representing the United States
Olympic Games
Silver medal – second place	1912 Stockholm	Standing high jump
Bronze medal – third place	1912 Stockholm	Standing long jump

Benjamin Willard Adams (March 31, 1890 – March 14, 1961) was an American athlete who competed mainly in the standing jumps. At the 1912 Summer Olympics, he won a silver medal in the standing high jump and a bronze in the standing long jump, while his elder brother Platt Adams won a gold and a silver, respectively. Ben also competed in the exhibition baseball tournament for Sweden.
