= Karl Bergh =

Swedish long and high jumper

Karl Ebbe Bergh (9 March 1883 – 9 May 1954) was a Swedish track and field athlete who competed in the 1912 Summer Olympics. He was born in Härnösand and died in Gudmundrå, Västernorrland County. In 1912, he finished seventh in the standing high jump event and 18th in the standing long jump competition.
