= Gustaf Malmsten =

Swedish long jumper (1889–1976)

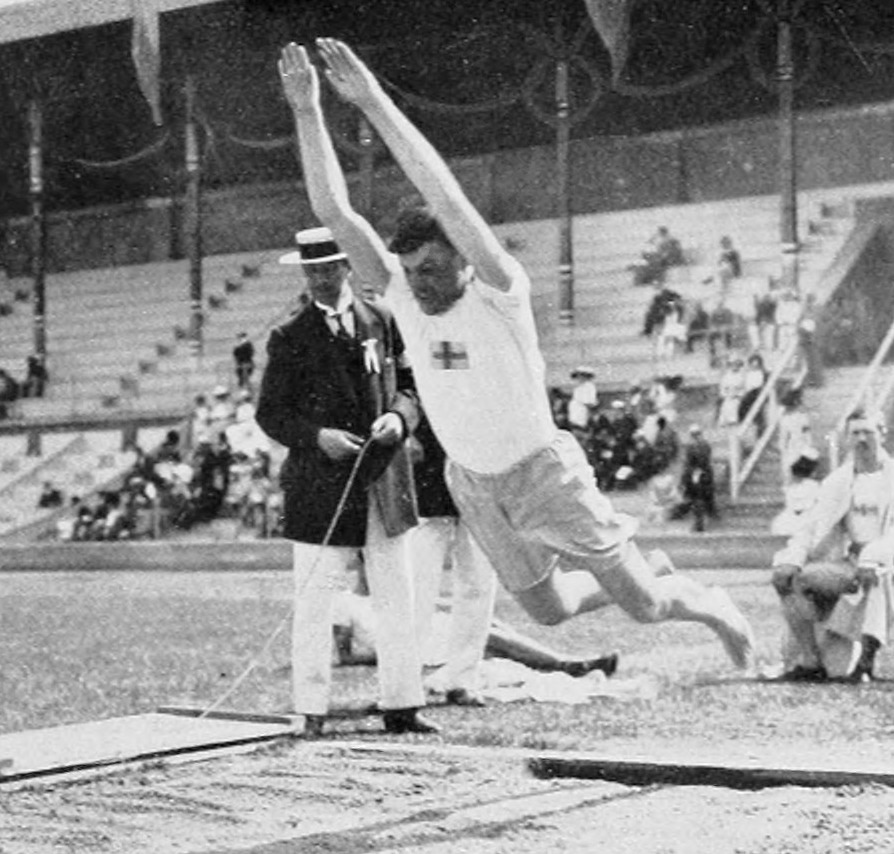
- Gustaf Malmsten at the 1912 Olympics

Personal information
- Born: 4 December 1889 Eskilstuna, Sweden
- Died: 30 March 1976 (aged 86) Eskilstuna, Sweden
- Height: 1.75 m (5 ft 9 in)
- Weight: 67 kg (148 lb)

Sport
- Sport: Long jump
- Club: IF Svea, Eskilstuna

Gustaf Malmsten (4 December 1889 – 30 March 1976) was a Swedish athlete. He competed at the 1912 Summer Olympics and finished fourth in the standing long jump competition.
