= Konstantinos Tsiklitiras =

Greek athlete (1888–1913)

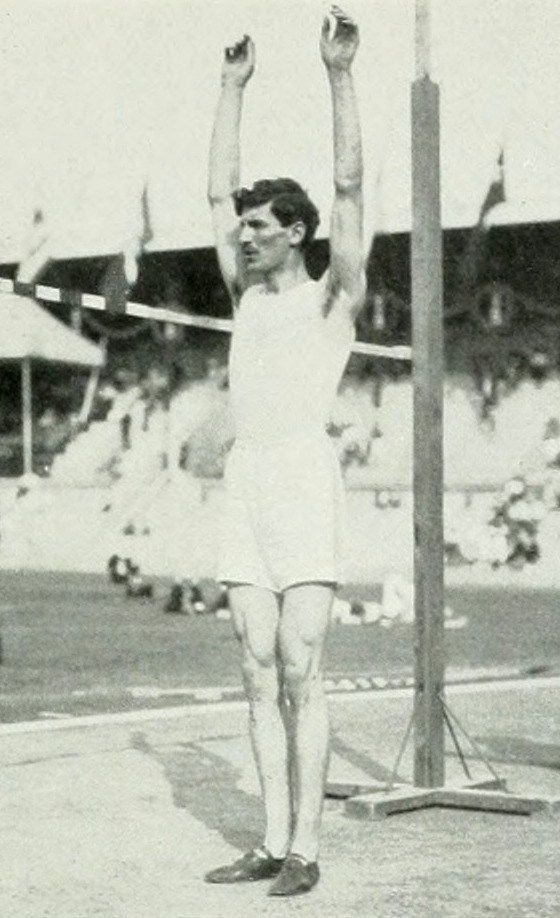
- Konstantinos Tsiklitiras competing at standing high jump at the 1912 Olympics

Personal information
- Native name: Κωνσταντίνος Τσικλητήρας
- Nickname: Kostas (Κώστας)
- Born: 30 October 1888 Pylos, Peloponnesos, Kingdom of Greece
- Died: 10 February 1913 (aged 24) Athens, Kingdom of Greece
- Height: 1.89 m (6 ft 2 in)
- Weight: 81 kg (179 lb)
- Military career
- Allegiance: Kingdom of Greece
- Branch: Hellenic Army
- Rank: Private
- Conflicts: Balkan Wars; First Balkan War; Battle of Bizani

Sport
- Country: Greece
- Sport: Jumping
- Club: Panellinios GS, Athina
Medal record
Representing Greece
Olympic Games
Gold medal – first place	1912 Stockholm	Standing long jump
Silver medal – second place	1908 London	Standing long jump
Silver medal – second place	1908 London	Standing high jump
Bronze medal – third place	1912 Stockholm	Standing high jump

Konstantinos "Kostis" Tsiklitiras (Greek: Κωνσταντίνος "Κωστής" Τσικλητήρας; 30 October 1888 – 10 February 1913) was a Greek athlete and Olympic champion.

Born in Pylos, he moved to Athens in 1905 to study medicine. Tsiklitiras soon took up sports and joined Panellinios GS. He practised football with Panellinios and Panathinaikos (he was the first goalkeeper of Panathinaikos) and water polo, but is best remembered for winning four Olympic medals in standing long jump and standing high jump in the 1908 and 1912 Summer Olympics. He was Greek champion 19 times.

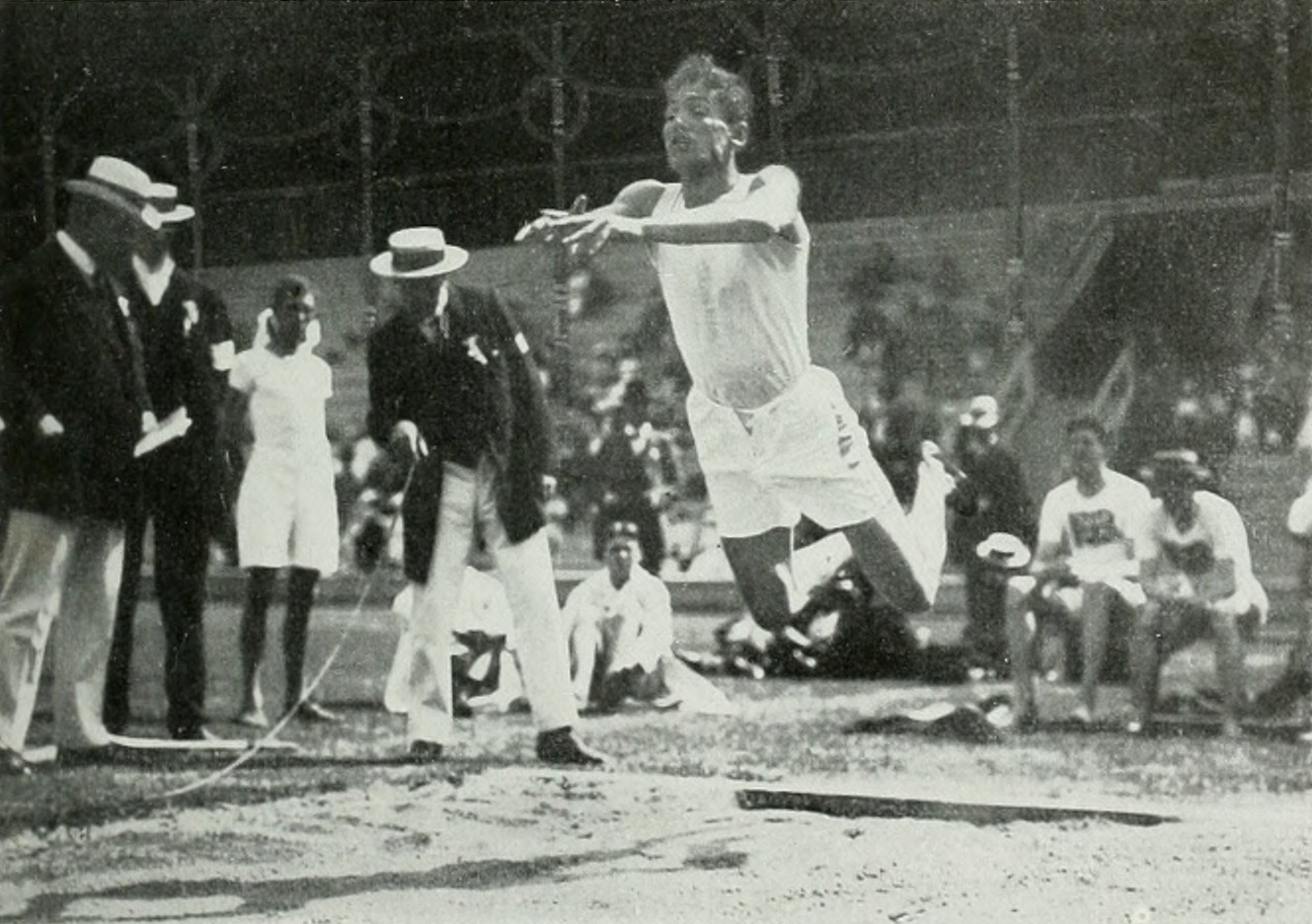
Tsiklitiras winning the gold medal in standing long jump in Stockholm, 1912

His career stopped in 1913 when he volunteered to fight in the Balkan Wars. Although he could avoid conscription, he insisted on fighting for his country and fought at the Battle of Bizani. He contracted meningitis and died in Athens at the age of 24. His family home still exists in Pylos and holds a museum of his athletic achievements. There is a marble statue in front.
