= Richard Byrd (athlete) =

American discus thrower

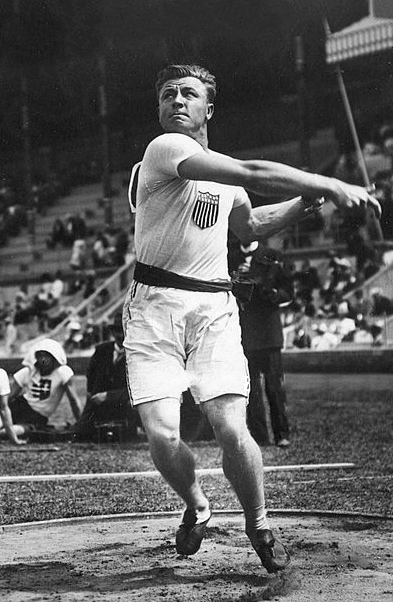
- Richard Byrd at the 1912 Olympics

Personal information
- Born: May 16, 1892 Shiloh, Indiana, United States
- Died: June 20, 1958 (aged 66)
- Height: 1.81 m (5 ft 11 in)
- Weight: 88 kg (194 lb)

Sport
- Sport: Discus throw, long jump, high jump, baseball
- Club: Adrian College
Medal record
Representing the United States
Olympic Games
Silver medal – second place	1912 Stockholm	Discus throw

Richard Leslie Byrd (May 16, 1892 – June 20, 1958) was an American athlete and baseball player who won the silver medal in the discus throw at the 1912 Summer Olympics. He finished fourth in the standing high jump, eighth in the standing long jump and 17th in the two handed discus throw event. At the same Olympics, he also was a member of USA national baseball team, which competed in a single baseball match held as a demonstration sport.
