= Frank Irons =

Athletics competitor (1886–1942)

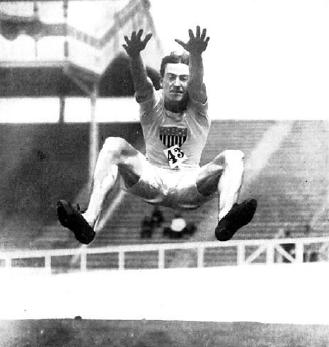
- Frank Irons in 1908

Medal record

Men's athletics

Representing the United States

Olympic Games
Gold medal – first place	1908 London	Long jump

Francis Cleveland Irons (March 23, 1886 – June 19, 1942) was an American athlete who competed in the 1908 Summer Olympics and in the 1912 Summer Olympics. He was born in Des Moines, Iowa and died in Palatine, Illinois.

Irons competed for the United States in the 1908 Games held in London, Great Britain in the long jump where he won the gold medal. In the standing high jump event, he finished eighth, and in the triple jump competition, he finished 16th. He also participated in the standing long jump contest, but his result is unknown.

Four years later, he finished ninth in the long jump competition at the 1912 Games. At this Olympics, he also competed in the exhibition baseball tournament.
