= Birger Brodtkorb =

Norwegian high jumper

Birger Brodtkorb (July 3, 1891 – July 24, 1935) was a Norwegian track and field athlete who specialized in the standing jumps. He represented Kristiania IF.

Participating in the 1912 Summer Olympics, he finished twelfth in the standing long jump competition. He also competed in standing high jump but did not advance to the final with a jump of 1.40 metres. He never became Norwegian champion but won a national silver medal in standing long jump in 1912.
