= Leo Goehring =

American track and field athlete

Leo Richard Goehring (November 5, 1891 – February 5, 1967) was an American track and field athlete who competed in the 1912 Summer Olympics. He was born in New York City and died in Bronx, New York. In 1912, he finished fourth in the standing high jump event and fifth in the standing long jump competition.
