= Alex Gordon (athlete) =

Scottish athlete and footballer

Personal information
- Nationality: British (Scottish)

Sport
- Sport: Athletics; Football
- Event: Long jump
- Club: West of Scotland Harriers

Alex Gordon
Personal information
- Position: Winger

Senior career*
Years	Team	Apps	(Gls)
1906–1908	Queen's Park	11	(1)
- * Club domestic league appearances and goals

Alexander Gordon was a Scottish footballer and athlete and was selected for the 1908 Summer Olympics.

== Biography ==
Gordon was educated at Allan Glen's School in Glasgow and dates the University of Glasgow. He was a winger with the Scottish football club Queen's Park F.C. and in 1907 won the sprint race for them at the annual Rangers F.C. athletic meeting.

Gordon won the Scottish Olympic trial over the 110 metres hurdles and finished second in the long jump. These performances at Ibrox Park led to qualification for both events at the Olympic Games.

Gordon was due to represent the Great Britain team at the 1908 Olympic Games in London, in both the long jump competition and the 110 metres hurdles competition but he injured his foot in an accident just two weeks before the start of the Olympics and was unable to start.

Gordon was one of 193 known Queens Park FC players to have served and survived World War I, while another 34 died.
