= Baseball at the 1912 Summer Olympics =

Demonstration sport

Tournament details
- Country: Sweden
- City: Stockholm
- Venue: Ostermalm Athletic Grounds
- Dates: July 15–16, 1912
- Teams: 2

Final positions
- Champions: United States
- Runners-up: Sweden

Tournament statistics
- Games played: 1

Baseball had its first appearance at the 1912 Summer Olympics as a demonstration sport. It became an official sport 70 years later at the 1992 Summer Olympics. (Note: Baseball was one of various sports appearing on schedules for the 1904 Summer Olympics in St. Louis; records or results of baseball games played during that Olympiad are lacking.) A game was played between the United States, the nation where the game was developed, and Sweden, the host nation. The game was held on Monday, 15 July 1912 and started at 10 a.m. on the Ostermalm Athletic Grounds in Stockholm; the U.S team won after six innings.

A second exhibition match was played between two American teams the next day, which notably included multi-sport Olympic athlete Jim Thorpe, a future Major League Baseball player and American football Hall of Famer.

== Game result ==
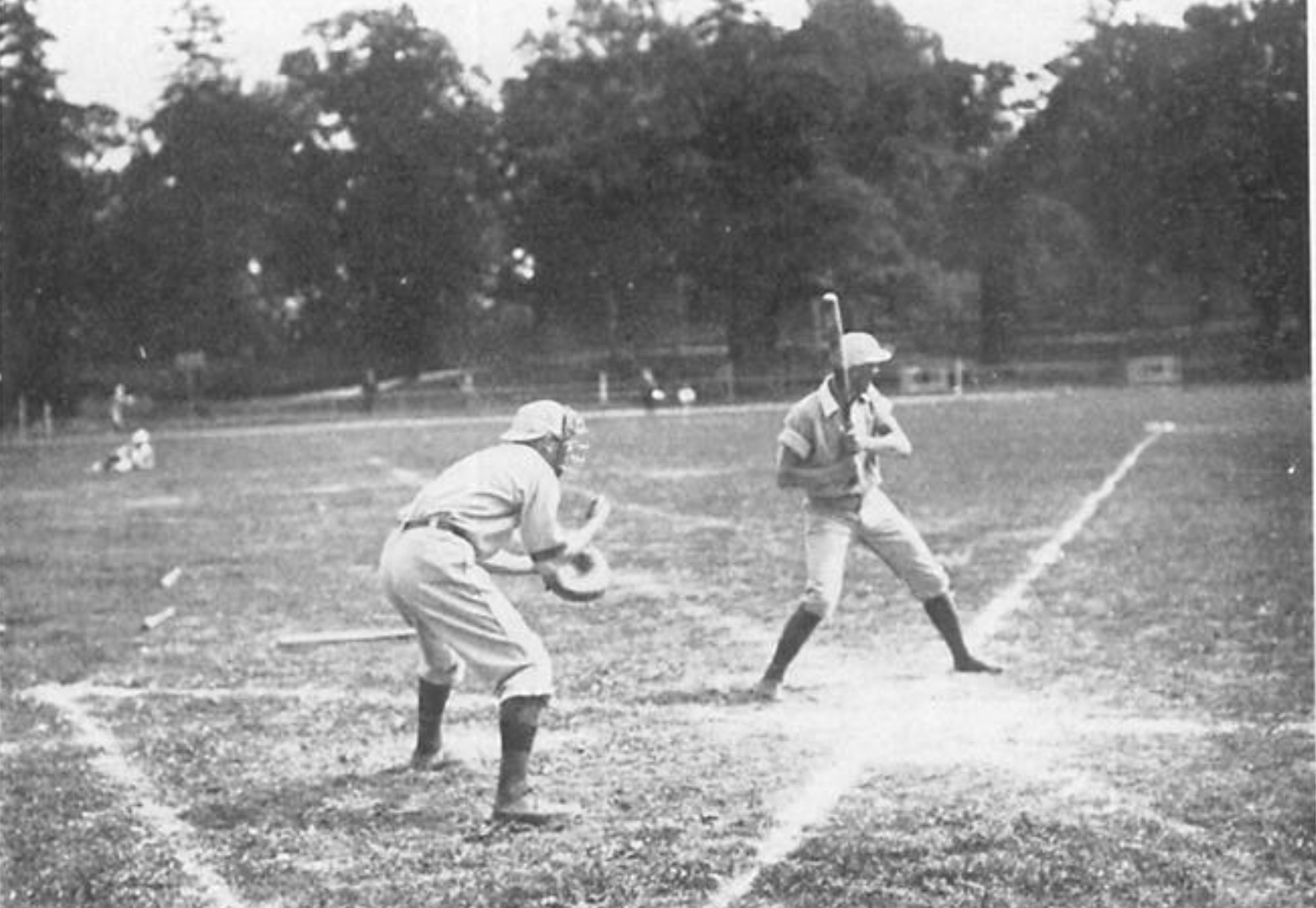
Sweden bats against the U.S. team

The Americans were represented by various members of the American Olympic track and field athletics delegation. The Swedish team was the Västerås baseball club, which had been formed by Swedish industrialist J. Sigfrid Edström (a future president of the International Olympic Committee) in 1910 as the first baseball club in Sweden.

Four of the Americans played for Sweden, as the Swedish pitchers and catchers were inexperienced. One area of concern was that the Swedes were unfamiliar with breaking balls; nevertheless, the Swedes were able to hold their own until the fifth inning, registering one extra-base hit. One Swede eventually relieved Adams and Nelson, the American pitchers.

Six innings were played, with the Americans not batting in the sixth and allowing the Swedes to have six outs in their half of the inning.

The game was umpired by George Wright, a retired American National League baseball player.

Since baseball was a demonstration sport, no official medals were awarded.

July 15, 10:00 at Ostermalm Athletic Grounds
Team	1	2	3	4	5	6	R	H	E
United States	4	1	0	0	8	X	13	10	2
Sweden (Note: Olympedia, a reference site administered by the International Olympic Committee, considers the Swedish squad that played on July 15 to be a "mixed team" as it featured American players.)	0	0	0	2	0	1	3	7	5
WP: Richard Byrd (1−0) LP: Benjamin Adams (0−1); Umpires: George Wright

=== Box score ===
United States	Pos.	AB	H	2B	3B	SB	R	E	vs.	Sweden	Pos.	AB	H	2B	3B	SB	R	E
Vaughn Blanchard	1B	1	1	0	0	0	0	1		Benjamin Adams (USA)	P	3	1	0	0	0	0	1
George Bonhag	1B	2	0	0	0	0	0	0		C. Axell	CF	3	0	0	0	0	0	0
Richard Byrd	P	0	0	0	0	0	0	0		Harlan Holden (USA)	P	0	0	0	0	0	0	0
J. Ira Courtney	3B	3	2	1	0	0	2	0		E. Johansson	LF	1	1	0	0	1	1	0
Ira Davenport	C	3	2	0	0	2	2	0		Landahl	2B	3	1	0	0	0	0	2
Howard Drew	RF	1	0	0	0	0	1	0		Y. Larson	RF	3	1	0	0	0	1	0
Carroll Haff	P	2	0	0	0	0	0	0		Frank Nelson (USA)	P	1	0	0	0	0	0	0
George Horine	LF	1	0	0	0	0	1	0		Wesley Oler (USA)	C	4	1	0	0	0	0	0
Frank Irons	LF	2	1	0	0	0	0	0		Sapery	SS	4	0	0	0	0	0	0
John Paul Jones	2B	3	1	0	0	2	1	0		Torsleff	LF	2	1	0	0	0	1	0
Fred Kelly	CF	3	1	0	0	0	1	1		Welin	1B	3	0	0	0	0	0	1
Abel Kiviat	SS	4	2	0	1	1	2	0		Wikman	3B	3	1	1	0	0	0	0
Walter McClure	P	0	0	0	0	0	1	0										
Norman Patterson	CF	1	0	0	0	0	0	0										
Lawrence Whitney	RF	1	0	0	0	0	1	0										
United States		27	10	1	1	5	13	2	Total	Sweden		30	7	1	0	1	3	5

== Exhibition match ==
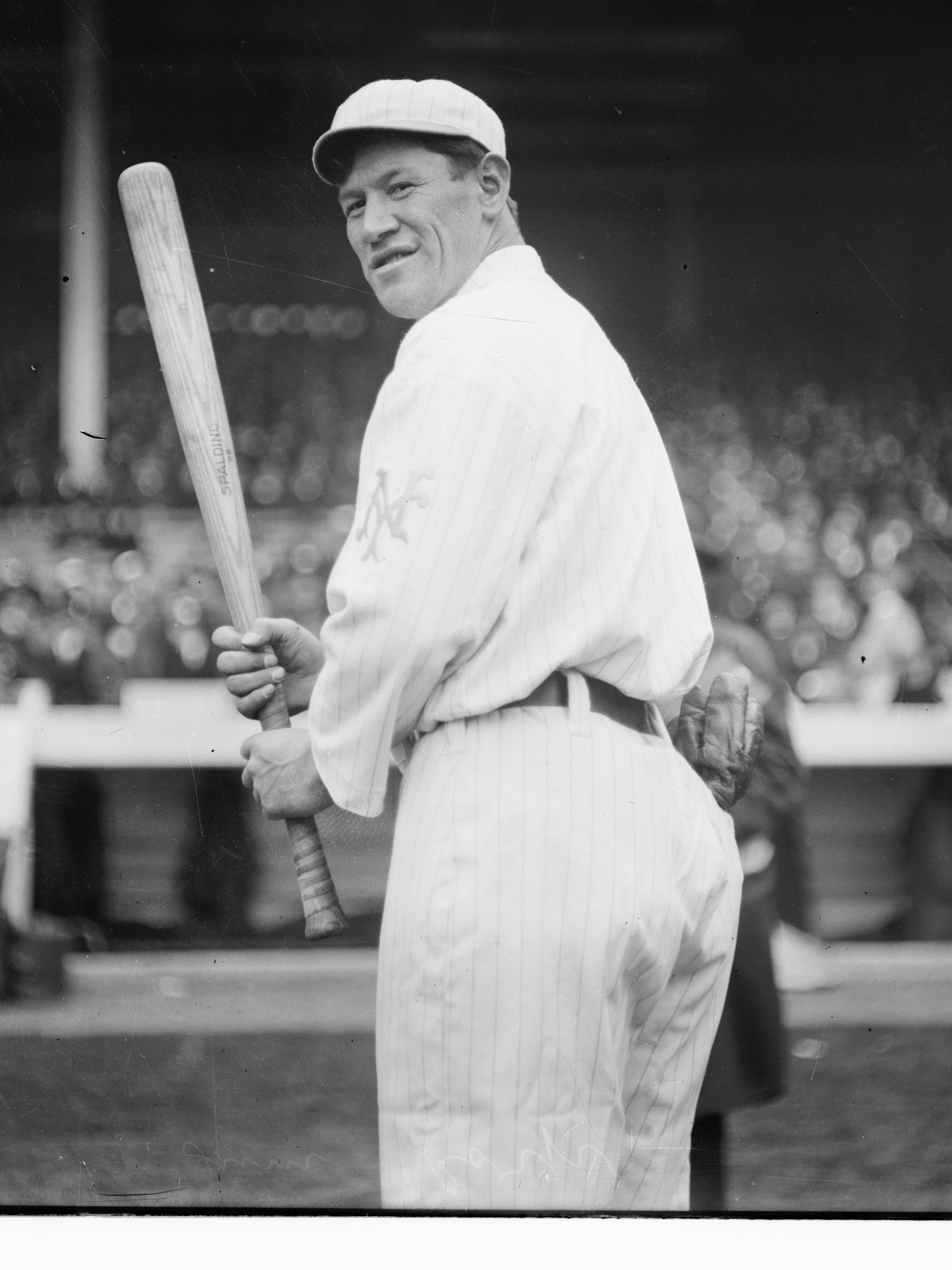
Jim Thorpe, pictured in 1913 with the New York Giants, played in the second exhibition game.

On the next day Tuesday, 16 July 1912 in the evening, two teams composed of an all-American line-up played an exhibition match against each other. This game included Jim Thorpe, who won two gold medals in the 1912 games (one in classic pentathlon and the other in decathlon); Thorpe, a noted college athlete, had briefly played minor league baseball in the Eastern Carolina League (which later caused the IOC to strip him of his medals; they were reinstated in 1983, thirty years after his death) and went on to play in MLB with the New York Giants.

=== Box score ===
US East "Olympics"	Pos.	AB	R	H	PO	A	E	vs.	US West "Finland"	Pos.	AB	R	H	PO	A	E
Benjamin Adams	CF	2	0	0	1	0	0		Richard Byrd	P/RF	3	0	0	1	1	0
Platt Adams	P	4	1	0	1	2	0		J. Ira Courtney	SS	3	0	0	1	1	0
George Bonhag	1B	4	0	0	8	0	1		Ira Davenport	LF	4	0	1	1	0	1
Charles Brickley	C	3	0	0	14	2	0		Carroll Haff	LB	4	0	0	7	0	0
Howard Drew	RF	3	1	1	0	0	0		George Horine	CF	4	1	1	3	0	0
Harlan Holden	LF	4	1	0	2	0	1		Frank Irons	2B	4	0	1	0	4	1
John Paul Jones	2B	2	0	1	0	1	0		Fred Kelly	3B	3	2	2	2	1	3
Abel Kiviat	SS	3	1	2	1	2	2		Edward Lindberg	C	4	0	0	12	2	1
Eugene Mercer	3B	4	1	1	0	1	0		Walter McClure	RF/P	4	0	2	0	1	0
Wesley Oler	CF	2	1	1	0	0	0									
Jim Thorpe	RF	2	0	1	0	0	0									
US East "Olympics"		33	6	7	27	8	4	Total	US West "Finland"		33	3	7	27	10	6

== Bibliography ==
- Cava, Pete (Summer 1992). "Baseball in the Olympics". Citius, Altius, Fortius. 1 (1): 7–15.
- Official Report. 1912 Stockholm Olympic Games. 1912.
