= Lancelot Stafford =

British athletics competitor (1887–1940)

Personal information
- Nationality: British (English)
- Born: 11 January 1887 Shepherd's Bush, London, England
- Died: 15 June 1940 (aged 53) Beckenham, London, England

Sport
- Sport: Athletics
- Events: High jump Long jump
- Club: London Athletic Club

Lancelot Henry Grahame Stafford (11 January 1887 – 15 June 1940) was a British athlete who competed at the 1908 Summer Olympics.

== Biography ==
Stafford was born in Shepherd's Bush, London, England. He was relatively unknown coming into 1908. He had won a high jump event at the Surbiton AA meeting but when he entered the Olympic trials and set two records in both the standing jump events it came as a surprise. He duly secured a place at the Olympic Games. It was only then that he decided to join a club and became a member of the London Athletic Club.

Stafford represented the Great Britain team at the 1908 Olympic Games in London, where he participated in the men's standing long jump and the men's standing high jump events. His mark in the standing long jump is unknown and he failed to progress. However, in the standing high jump event held on 23 July, Stafford finished in equal 17th place with a jump of 1.32 metres.

By 1911 he was working for Phoenix Assurance and in 1913 Stafford won the Amateur Field Events Association long jump title but has his career was effectively ended by World War I, where he served a with the Artists Rifles with the rank of captain. He worked as the Surrey area manager for Phoenix Assurance for over 30 years, retiring in 1935.
