= Charles Williams (athlete) =

British track and field athlete

Personal information
- Nationality: British (English)
- Born: 23 June 1887 Wolverhampton, England
- Died: 15 December 1971 (aged 84) Malvern, Worcestershire, England

Sport
- Sport: Athletics
- Event: long jump
- Club: University of Cambridge AC; Achilles Club

Charles Harold Williams (23 June 1887 – 15 December 1971) was a British track and field athlete who competed in the 1908 Summer Olympics.

== Biography ==
Wiliams was born in Wolverhampton and educated at Emmanuel College in the University of Cambridge, winning his blue in 1908.

Williams represented Great Britain at the 1908 Summer Olympics in London, where he finished eleventh in the long jump event.

In 1913 he won the Northern Counties title. He died in Malvern, Worcestershire on 15 December 1971.
