= Philip Kingsford =

British athlete (1891–1919)

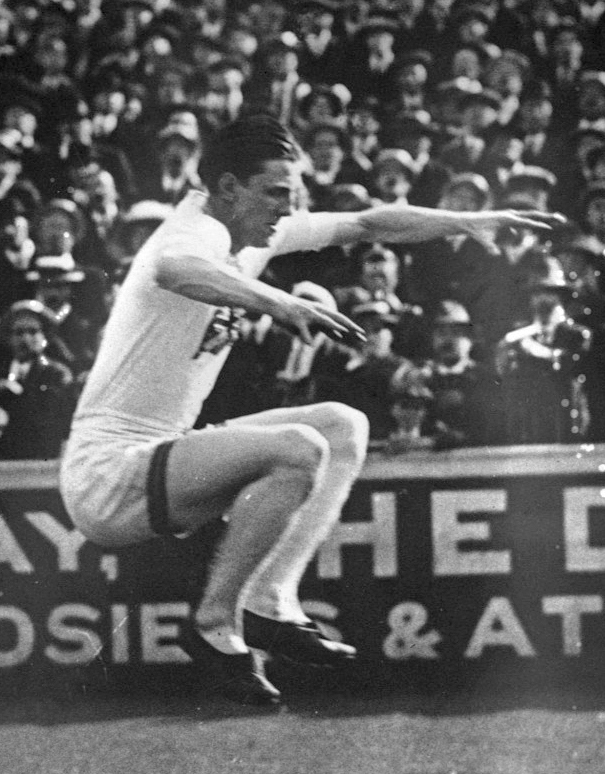
- Kingsford in 1914

Personal information
- Born: 10 August 1891 Lewisham, London
- Died: 26 July 1919 (aged 27) Hammersmith, London

Sport
- Sport: Athletics
- Events: Long jump, triple jump
- Club: L.A.C., London

Achievements and titles
- Personal bests: LJ – 7.09 m (1914); TJ – 13.57 m (1912)

Philip Cave Kingsford (10 August 1891 – 26 July 1919) was a British track and field athlete who competed at the 1912 Summer Olympics.

== Career ==
Kingsford finished second behind Percy Kirwan in the long jump event at the 1912 AAA Championships.

Shortly after the 1912 AAA Championships, he competed for Great Britain at the 1912 Olympic Games, in Stockholm, Sweden, where he finished 15th in the long jump and 19th in the standing long jump event.

In 1914, Kingsford became the National long jump champion after winning the 1914 AAA Championships title and finished fourth in the triple jump.

He served with the Middlesex Regiment in India.
