= Harlan Holden =

American baseball player

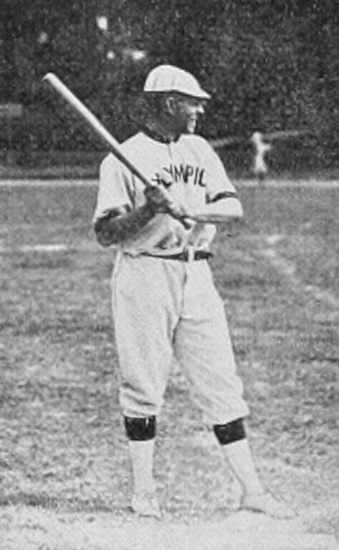
- Harlan Holden at the 1912 Olympics

Personal information
- Born: March 31, 1888 Cincinnati, Ohio, United States
- Died: June 7, 1962 (aged 74)
- Height: 1.92 m (6 ft 4 in)
- Weight: 77 kg (170 lb)

Sport
- Sport: Middle-distance running, baseball
- Club: Bates College and the Boston AA

Harlan Ware Holden (March 31, 1888 – June 7, 1962) was an American athlete who competed at the 1912 Summer Olympics in the track and field 800-meter run and in the exhibition baseball tournament. Holden was one of four Americans who played for the Swedish team. Harlan attended Bates College in Lewiston, Maine.
