= 1909 AAA Championships =

Outdoor track and field competition

- Dates: 3 July 1909
- Host city: London, England
- Venue: Stamford Bridge (stadium)
- Level: Senior
- Type: Outdoor
- Events: 16

The 1909 AAA Championships was the 1909 edition of the annual outdoor track and field competition organised by the Amateur Athletic Association (AAA). It was held on Saturday 3 July 1909 at the Stamford Bridge (stadium) in London, England. The attendance was estimated to be between 10 and 12,000.

The Championships consisted of 16 events.

== Results ==
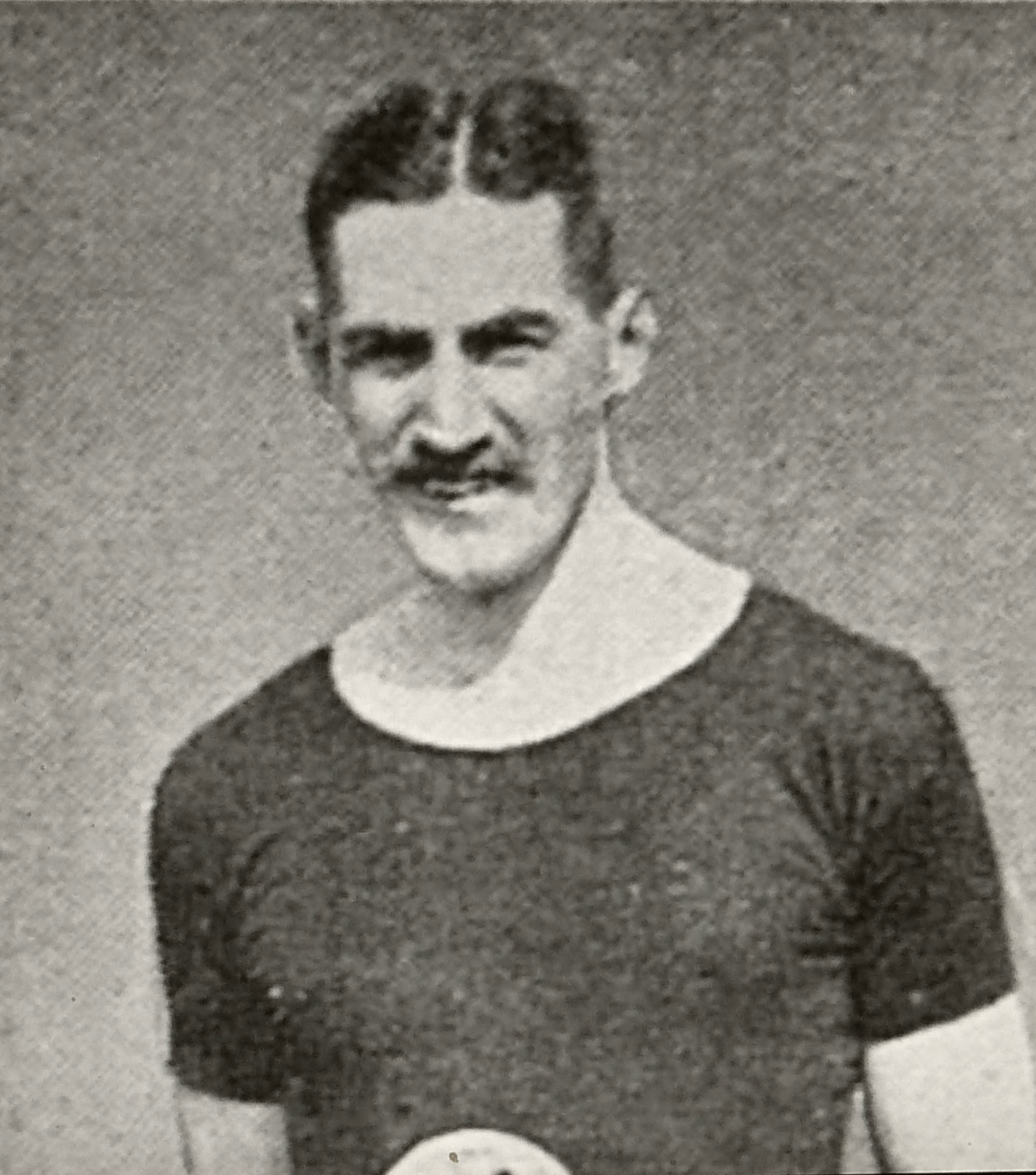
440 yards champion Alan Patterson would lose his life in WWI as did the 880 yards champion Hanns Braun of Germany

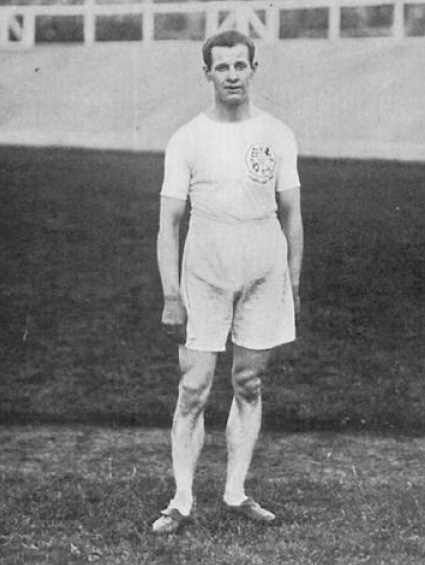
Olympic champion Emil Voigt won the 4 miles title

Event	Gold		Silver		Bronze	
100 yards	(South Africa) Reginald Walker	10.0	(United States) Nathaniel Cartmell	1 ft	(Canada) Robert Kerr	6 ins
220 yards	(United States) Nathaniel Cartmell	22.0	(Canada) Robert Kerr	2-3 yd	Ernest Haley	4 yd
440 yards	Alan Patterson	50.6/51.2	Lionel Reed	50.6/4 yd	Edwin Montague	
880 yards	(Germany) Hanns Braun	1:57.6	Arthur Astley	1:57.8	Ivo Fairbairn-Crawford	1:59.0
1 mile	Eddie Owen	4:23.0	(Scotland) Arthur Robertson	4:23.4	Richard Yorke	4:24.4
4 miles	Emil Voigt	19:57.6	Arthur Robertson	19:59.0	A. Edward Wood	20 yd
10 miles	A. Edward Wood	52:40.0	William Scott	53:49.0	Bertie Long	53:58.8
steeplechase	Reginald Noakes	11:02.4	Harry Hart	11:12.2	G. M. Parkinson	11:29.4
120yd hurdles	Alfred Healey	15.8	Kenneth Powell	inches-1 yd	(South Africa) John Duncker	inches-½ yd
2 miles walk	Ernest Webb	13:56.4	(New Zealand) Albert Rowland	14:26.6	T. J. Eaton	14:40.6
7 miles walk	Ernest Webb	52:37.0	Fred Carter	54:44.6	Alred Pateman	55:14.0
high jump	John Banks	1.753	(Leinster) Tim Ahearne	1.740	Cyril Dugmore	1.702
pole jump	Alf Flaxman	2.93	not awarded		only 1 competitor	
long jump	(Leinster) Tim Ahearne	6.81	Sidney Abrahams	6.53	(Scotland) Wilfred Bleaden	6.22
shot put	(Leinster) Denis Horgan	13.43	(Scotland) Tom Nicolson	12.20	Henry Alan Leeke	11.48
hammer throw	(Scotland) Tom Nicolson	50.20	(Leinster) Denis Horgan	41.80	Alan Fyffe	39.71
