= Frederick Kitching =

British athlete

Personal information
- Nationality: British (English)
- Born: 4 July 1886 Cockerton, County Durham, England
- Died: 11 August 1918 (aged 32) Dunkirk, France

Sport
- Sport: Track and field
- Event: Standing long jump
- Club: L.A.C.

Frederick Overend Kitching (4 July 1886 – 11 August 1918) was a British track and field athlete known for his performances in standing jumps and the javelin throw, including participation in the standing long jump at the 1908 Summer Olympics in London, where he placed outside the top positions.

== Early life ==
He was the fourth child of John Kitching, a resident of Darlington born on 28 January 1854, and Annie Elizabeth Bayne, born on 1 March 1861 as the eldest daughter of Edward Bayne of Sunderland Wick near Driffield and his wife Rachel Wilkinson. The family belonged to the Kitching lineage of Darlington, with John and Annie marrying on 28 April 1882 at Holy Trinity Church in Ripon.

Kitching had nine siblings: John (born 1883), Alfred (1884), Annie Isabelle (1885, died in infancy), Arthur Ernest (1887), William Henry (1889), Herbert (1890), Beatrice Madeline (1891), Ronald Cecil (1893), and Gerald (1896). He was one of seven grandsons of Alfred Kitching, an early railway engineer noted for building the Derwent locomotive for the Stockton and Darlington Railway.

== Athletics career ==
Frederick Kitching specialized in standing jumps at the outset of his athletic career, focusing on events such as the standing long jump that required explosive power without a run-up. He represented Great Britain at the 1908 Summer Olympics, where he competed in the men's standing long jump event. The standing long jump qualifying round occurred on 20 July 1908, featuring 25 athletes from 11 nations, with competitors performing three jumps from a stationary position without a run-up. Kitching did not advance to the final, and official records list his jump distance as unrecorded.

Following his participation in the standing long jump at the 1908 Summer Olympics, where he placed outside the medals, Frederick Kitching shifted focus toward the javelin throw, an event then underdeveloped in British athletics. Initially recognized as a specialist in standing jumps, Kitching achieved pioneering consistency in the javelin, becoming the first British athlete to exceed 120 feet (36.58 m), 130 feet (39.62 m), and 140 feet (42.68 m). This transition reflected broader experimentation amid modest national standards, as javelin throwing remained a neglected field event in Britain prior to its formal inclusion in the Amateur Athletic Association (AAA) Championships in 1914.

Kitching's advancements culminated in May 1914 at Stamford Bridge, where he established a new British native record with a throw of 143 feet 3 inches (43.66 m), marking his personal best. As one of Britain's early javelin pioneers, his efforts highlighted the event's gradual adoption amid limited domestic competition and training resources.

== Personal life ==
Kitching was a solicitor by trade and served as an orderly in the Friends' Ambulance Unit during the First World War. He joined the unit after declaring himself a conscientious objector. Serving for two years, Kitching died in a German air raid on Dunkirk on August 11, 1918. He is buried at Dunkirk Town Cemetery.

== See also ==
- List of Olympians killed in World War I
