= Frank Holmes (athlete) =

American long and high jumper

Francis LeRoy Holmes (January 23, 1885 – February 14, 1980) was an American track and field athlete who competed in the 1908 Summer Olympics. He was born in Brazil and died in Sherman Oaks, Los Angeles, California.

In 1908, he finished fourth in the standing high jump competition and sixth in the standing long jump event.
