= Henri Jardin =

French athletics competitor (1881–1946)

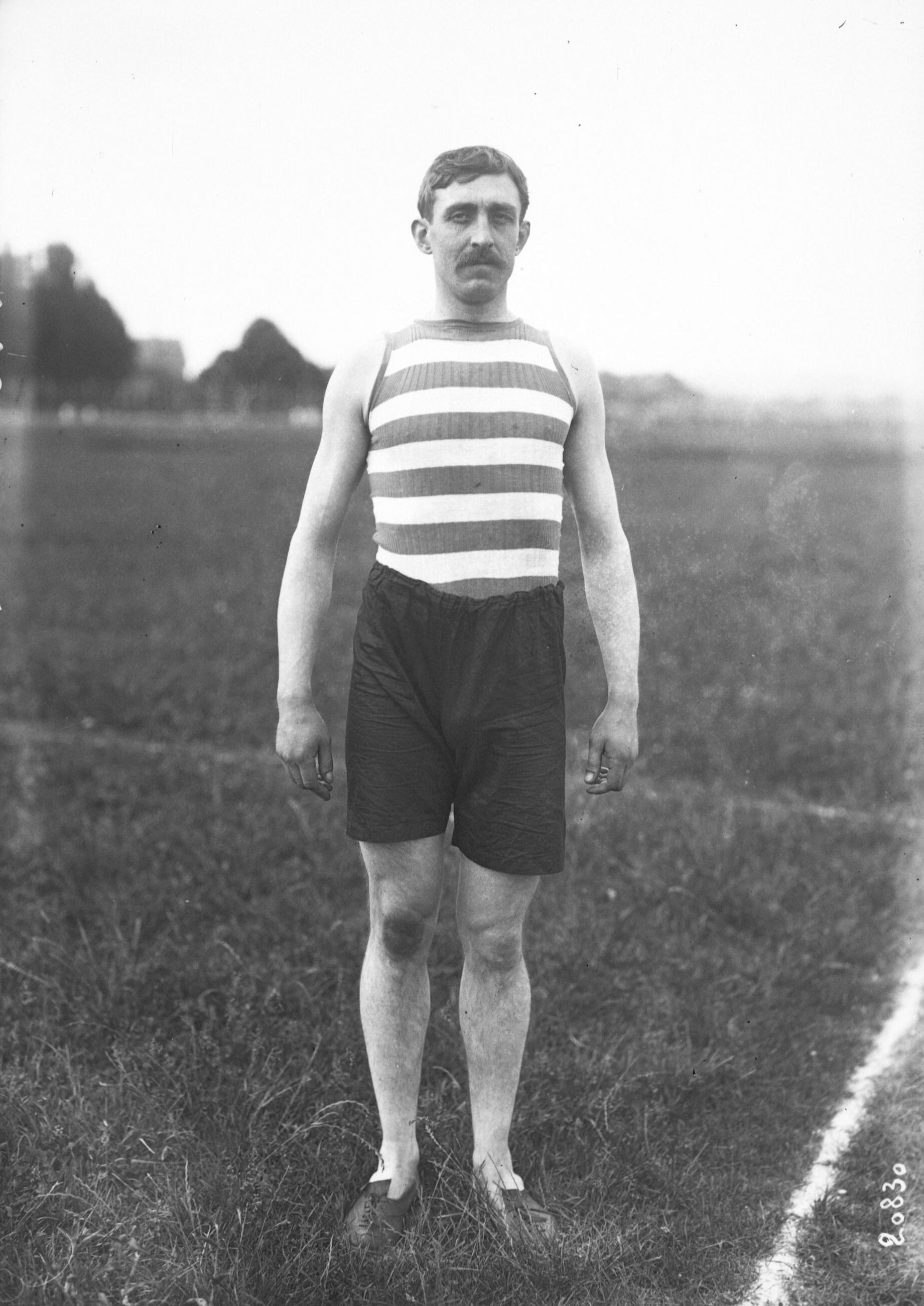
- Jardin in 1912

Personal information
- Born: 23 June 1881 Paris, France
- Died: 1 December 1946 (aged 64) Villejuif, France

Sport
- Sport: Athletics
- Club: Racing Club de France, Paris; Métropolitain Club Colombes

Henri Alphonse Jardin (23 June 1881 – 10 May 1946) was a French athlete. He competed in the standing long jump and standing high jump at the 1906 Intercalated Games and 1908 Summer Olympics with the best result of ninth place in the long jump in 1906. He was the national champion in standing long jump in 1905, 1907 and 1908 and finished second in 1911 and 1912.
