= Calvin Bricker =

Athletics competitor

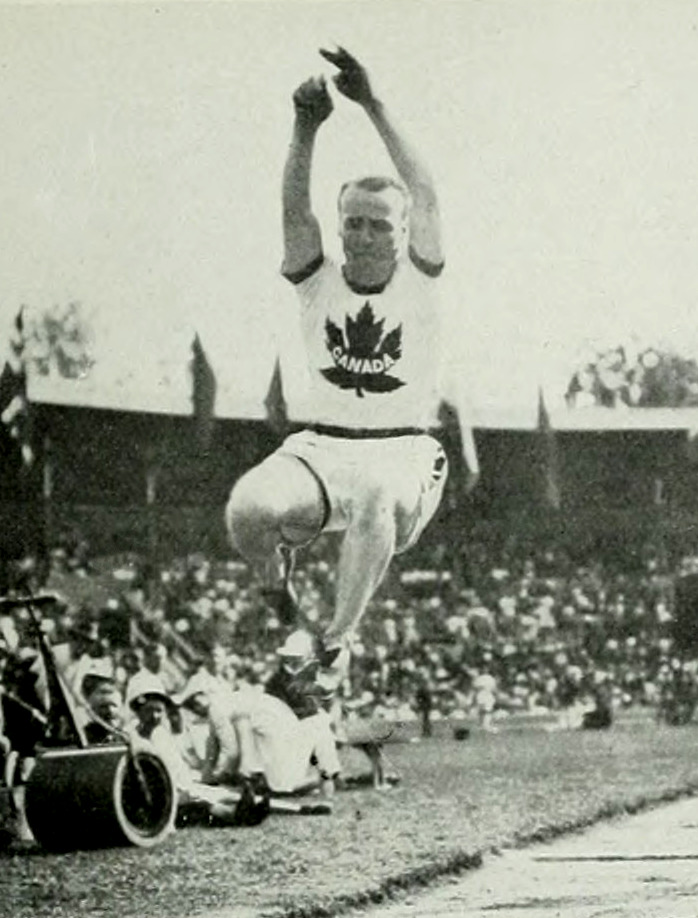
- Calvin Bricker at the 1912 Olympics

Personal information
- Born: 3 November 1884 Listowel, Ontario, Canada
- Died: 24 April 1963 (aged 78) Grenfell, Saskatchewan, Canada

Sport
- Sport: Long jump, triple jump
- Club: Toronto West End YMCA
Medal record
Representing Canada
Olympic Games
Bronze medal – third place	1908 London	Long jump
Silver medal – second place	1912 Stockholm	Long jump

Calvin David "Cal" Bricker (3 November 1884 – 24 April 1963) was a Canadian track and field athlete. He competed in the long jump and triple jump at the 1908 and 1912 Olympics and won a bronze and a silver medal in the long jump, respectively. At the 1908 Olympic trials, he set a national record in the long jump that stood for 27 years.

Bricker graduated from the University of Toronto in 1907 with a degree in dentistry. He served in World War I as a dentist and helped organize the 1919 Inter-Allied Games in Paris. He spent most of his later years practicing dentistry in Grenfell. He was inducted into Canada's (1956), the Saskatchewan (1966), and the University of Toronto (1996) Sports Halls of Fame. The Cal D. Bricker Memorial Trophy is given annually to the Canada's best long jumper.
