= Platt Adams =

American athlete (1885–1961)

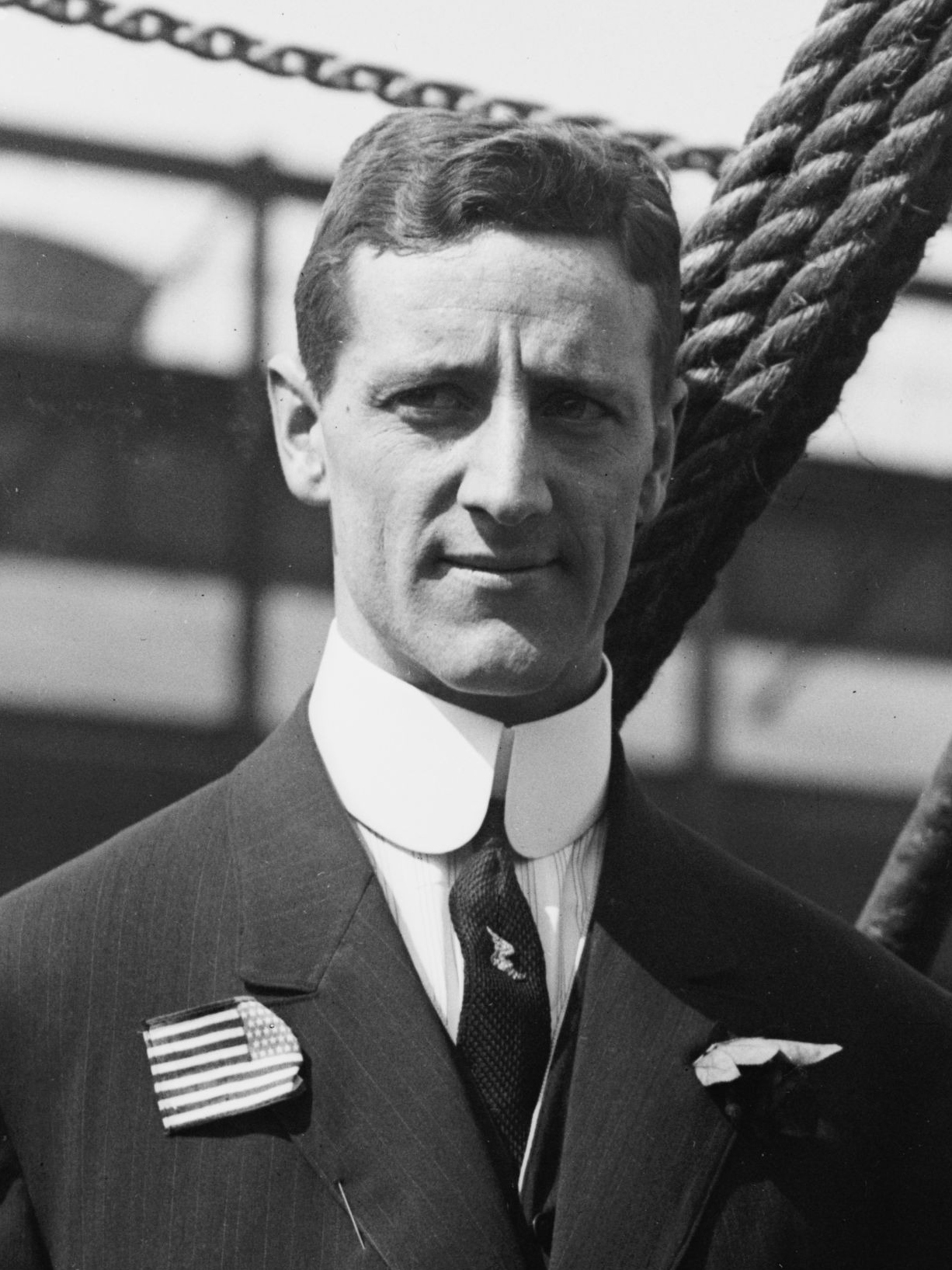
- Platt Adams in 1913

Personal information
- Born: March 23, 1885 Belleville, New Jersey, United States
- Died: February 27, 1961 (aged 75) Normandy Beach, United States
- Height: 1.88 m (6 ft 2 in)
- Weight: 78 kg (172 lb)

Sport
- Sport: Athletics
- Club: NYAC, New York
Medal record
Representing the United States
Olympic Games
| Gold medal – first place | 1912 Stockholm | Standing high jump |
| Silver medal – second place | 1912 Stockholm | Standing long jump |

Platt Adams (March 23, 1885 – February 27, 1961) was an American athlete. He competed in various events at the 1908 and 1912 Olympics and won a gold and a silver medal in jumping events in 1912.

== Biography ==
Adams was born in Belleville, New Jersey. He had a brother, Ben Adams, also an Olympic athlete. In 1908 he finished fifth in the triple jump competition as well as in the standing high jump event. In the standing long jump competition, he finished sixth. He also participated in the discus throw event and in the Greek discus contest but in both events his result is unknown.

Four years later, he won the gold medal in the standing high jump and the silver medal in the standing long jump. In 1912, he also finished fifth in the triple jump competition and 23rd in the high jump event. At the same Olympics, he competed in the baseball event, which was held as demonstration sport.

In January 1915, the Metropolitan Association of the Amateur Athletic Union found Adams not guilty on charges of professionalism, having sold a prize or accepted cash for a medal in violation of his amateur status, in connection with a claim the Adams had traded a trophy he had received at an exhibition jump in exchange for pins.

A resident of South Orange, Adams was serving in the New Jersey General Assembly when he was named as the state's Chief Boxing Inspector in March 1923.

He died at his home in the Normandy Beach section of Toms River, New Jersey on February 27, 1961.
