= Garfield MacDonald =

Canadian track and field competitor

Medal record

Men's athletics

Representing Canada

Olympic Games
Silver medal – second place	1908 London	Triple jump

James Abram Garfield MacDonald (August 8, 1881 – November 6, 1951) was a Canadian athlete who competed mainly in the triple jump. He was born in Lower South River, Nova Scotia. He competed for Canada in the 1908 Summer Olympics held in London in the triple jump where he won the silver medal.

== Sources ==
- Brannen, John (February 20, 2014). "Nova Scotia's first Olympic medalist: Garf Macdonald brought home silver in 1908". The News. Archived from the original on March 24, 2014.
