= Norman Patterson (athlete) =

American track and field athlete and baseball player

James Norman Carlton Patterson (July 4, 1886 – May 25, 1961) was an American track and field athlete who competed in the 1912 Summer Olympics. He was born in Chicago, Illinois, and died in Detroit, Michigan.

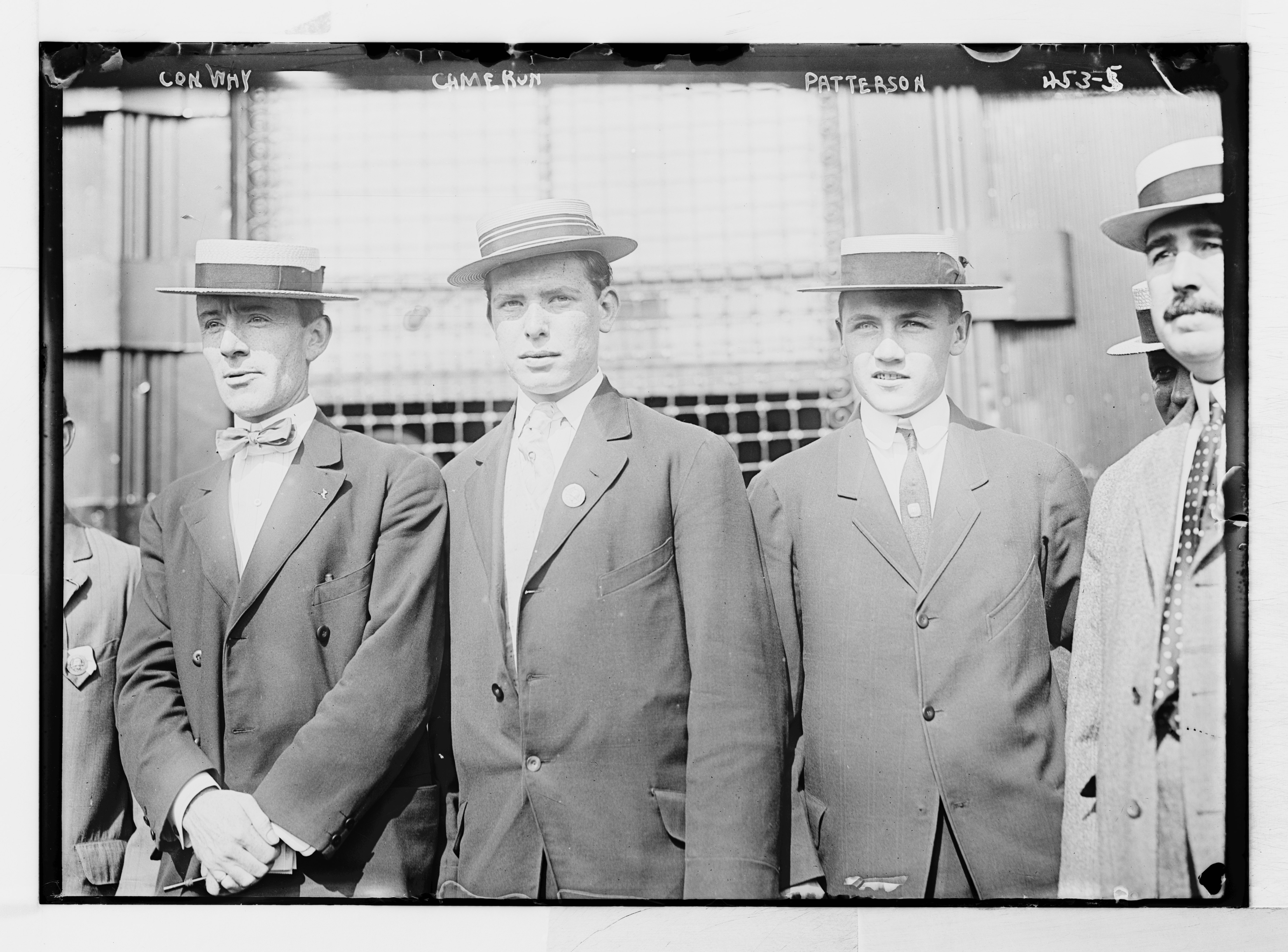

In 1912, he was eliminated in the first round of the 1500 metres event after finishing third in his heat. He also competed in the exhibition baseball tournament at the 1912 Olympics.
