= Ernest Hutcheon =

Australian cricketer (1889–1937)

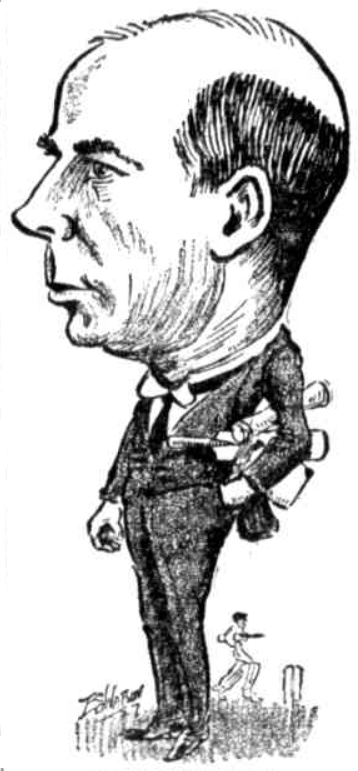

Personal information
- Full name: Ernest Henry Hutcheon
- Born: 17 June 1889; Toowoomba, Queensland, Australia
- Died: 9 June 1937 (aged 47); Brisbane, Queensland, Australia
- Batting: Right-handed
- Role: Batsman

Domestic team information
- Years: Team
- 1919/20–1925/26: Queensland

Career statistics
Competition	First-class
Matches	7
Runs scored	188
Batting average	17.09
100s/50s	0/1
Top score	71
Catches/stumpings	8/0
- Source: CricketArchive, 27 May 2021

Ernest Henry Hutcheon (17 June 1889 – 9 June 1937) was an Australian sportsman who played first-class cricket for Queensland and represented Australasia in standing high jump at the 1908 Summer Olympics.

Hutcheon, who was from Toowoomba, represented Australasia at the 1908 Summer Olympics in London as an 18-year-old. He competed in the Men's Standing High Jump, where he was the youngest out of the 23 athletes in the event and the only from the Australasian team.

In the Great War, Hutcheon fought in Europe, rising to the rank of lieutenant-colonel. He was badly hurt in a gas attack, which he never fully recovered from.

His Queensland representative cricket career began in 1920 when he made his first-class debut in a match against New South Wales. All but two of his first-class appearances were made against New South Wales; his other opponents were South Australia and the touring New Zealand national team. He made his highest score and only half century, an innings of 71 when Queensland took on New South Wales at the Sydney Cricket Ground in the 1925/26 season. The innings helped Queensland to draw the match, after following on. In 1927, the Queensland Cricket Association elected Hutcheon as a State selector, and he served as selector until being voted out in 1933.

Outside of sport, he worked as a barrister and, as well as practising in the Queensland Crown Law Office, also had a private practice in his hometown. He wrote a book, called 'A History of Queensland Cricket', which was released posthumously in 1946. Hutcheon's brother John was a more successful cricketer for Queensland and briefly served as the chairman of the Australian Cricket Board in the 1920s.

Hutcheon died in 1937 and was buried in Brisbane's Toowong Cemetery.
