= Edvard Larsen =

Norwegian triple jumper (1881–1914)

Olympic medal record

Men's athletics

Representing Norway
Bronze medal – third place	1908 London	Triple jump

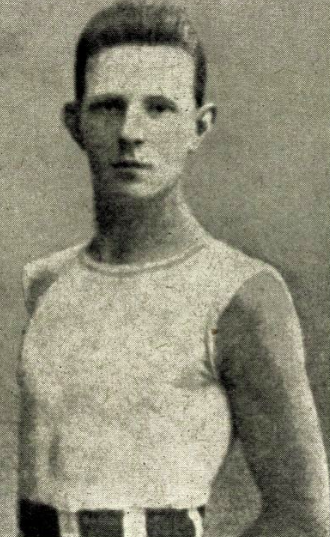

Edvard Larsen (Martin Edvard Larsen; 27 October 1881 – 10 September 1914) was a Norwegian triple jumper. He represented Kristiania IF.

At the 1908 Summer Olympics held in London, he won the bronze medal with a jump of 14.39 metres. This remained his career best jump. At the 1912 Summer Olympics he finished sixth with 14.06 metres, and he also competed for the 4 x 100 metres relay team that was disqualified. He became Norwegian champion in triple jump in 1900, 1906, 1908 and 1911 and in long jump in 1906 and 1908. Larsen died of an illness in Oslo, 32 years old.
