= Cyril Dugmore =

British military officer and athlete

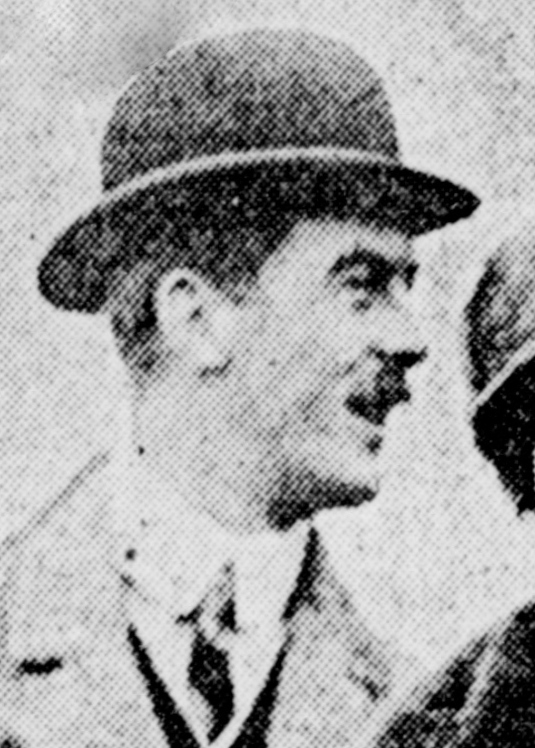
- Cyril P. W. F. R. Dugmore

Personal information
- Born: 20 May 1882 Birr, Ireland
- Died: 22 January 1966 (aged 83) Saint Sampson, Guernsey, Channel Islands

Sport
- Sport: Athletics
- Event: long jump / triple jump / high jump
- Club: Birchfield Harriers

Cyril Patrick William Francis Radclyffe Dugmore (20 May 1882 – 22 January 1966) was a British Army officer and track and field athlete who competed in the 1908 Summer Olympics.

== Biography ==
Dugmore was born in Birr and died on Guernsey. He was a grandson of William Brougham, 2nd Baron Brougham and Vaux, and a brother of artist-author Arthur Radclyffe Dugmore.

He was commissioned a second lieutenant in the Army Service Corps on 16 August 1902, and was stationed in South Africa in the aftermath of the Second Boer War. He was listed as returning to Southampton on the SS Orcana in January 1903, and as then stationed at Woolwich. He later fought in the First World War.

Dugmore represented Great Britain at the 1908 Summer Olympics in London, where he finished eleventh in the triple jump event.

Dugmore finished third in the high jump event at the 1909 AAA Championships.

He was married to New York socialite Lilla Gilbert (nee Brokaw), the widow of H. Bramhall Gilbert, in January 1914. They divorced in 1923.
