= Doug Stupart =

South African track and field athlete

Douglas Annesley David Stupart (30 March 1882 – 6 May 1953) was a South African track and field athlete who competed in the 1908 Summer Olympics. In 1908, he finished tenth in the triple jump event. He also participated in the 110 metre hurdles competition but was eliminated in the first round.
