= Forest Fletcher =

American athlete

Forest Fletcher (April 27, 1888 – November 27, 1945) was born in Lincoln, Nebraska and died in Lexington, Virginia.

Raised in Chicago, Fletcher attended the University of Notre Dame with his boyhood friend, legendary football player and coach Knute Rockne, with whom he shared Norwegian descent. As a track and field athlete, Fletcher competed in the 1912 Summer Olympics in Stockholm, Sweden, finishing seventh in men's standing high jump and ninth in the men's standing long jump. After college, he taught in Cedar City, Utah and Mitchell, South Dakota before being hired by Washington & Lee University, where he served as cross country and track coach and athletic director. During World War I, he organized students to serve with him in France with a medical ambulance unit. In 1936, he accompanied the US track and field team, which included the great Jesse Owens, to the Berlin Olympics.

Forest Fletcher running hurdles

== Personal life ==
Married to Laura Powell Tucker (1892-1986) of Lexington, Virginia, he was the father of Rosa Fletcher Crocker, Henrietta Fletcher Horan, and Forest Fletcher, Jr.
