= Tim Ahearne =

Irish long and triple jumper

Personal information
- Born: 17 August 1885 Athea, Limerick, Ireland
- Died: 12 December 1968 (aged 83) Deposit, New York, USA

Sport
- Sport: Athletics
- Event: long jump / high jump
- Club: Athea
Medal record
Representing Great Britain
Olympic Games
| Gold medal – first place | 1908 London | Triple jump |

Timothy Joseph Ahearne (17 August 1885 – 12 December 1968) was an Irish track and field athlete who competed for the United Kingdom of Great Britain and Ireland in the 1908 Summer Olympics.

== Biography ==
Son of William Aherne, a farmer, and Margaret Aherne (née Shine), he was born in Dirreen, Athea, Limerick, and was the older brother of Dan Ahearn, the world record holder of the triple jump from 1911–1924.

Ahearne won the gold medal in the triple jump at the 1908 Summer Olympics held in London while representing the United Kingdom of Great Britain and Ireland. He finished eighth in the long jump competition and also participated in the standing long jump event, but his result is unknown. In the 110 metre hurdles, where he was an Irish champion, he was eliminated in the semi-finals.

After his Olympic victory in 1908, Ahearne won the British AAA Championships title in the long jump event at the 1909 AAA Championships.

Ahearne emigrated to New York in 1909 and joined the Irish American Athletic Club. He also competed for a time for the rival New York Athletic Club. Later in life, Ahearne raised "prize-winning" cattle on a farm in upstate New York. His current relatives live in America today.
