= Alfred Motté =

French long jumper (1887–1918)

Personal information
- Born: 2 June 1887 Roubaix, France
- Died: 31 October 1918 (aged 31) Sézanne, France

Sport
- Sport: Track and field
- Events: Standing high jump Standing long jump

Alfred Motté (2 June 1887 – 31 October 1918) was a French athlete. He competed at the 1908 Summer Olympics and the 1912 Summer Olympics. He was killed in action during World War I.

== See also ==
- List of Olympians killed in World War I
