= Athletics at the 1912 Summer Olympics – Men's 100 metres =

Men's 100 metres at the Games of the V Olympiad
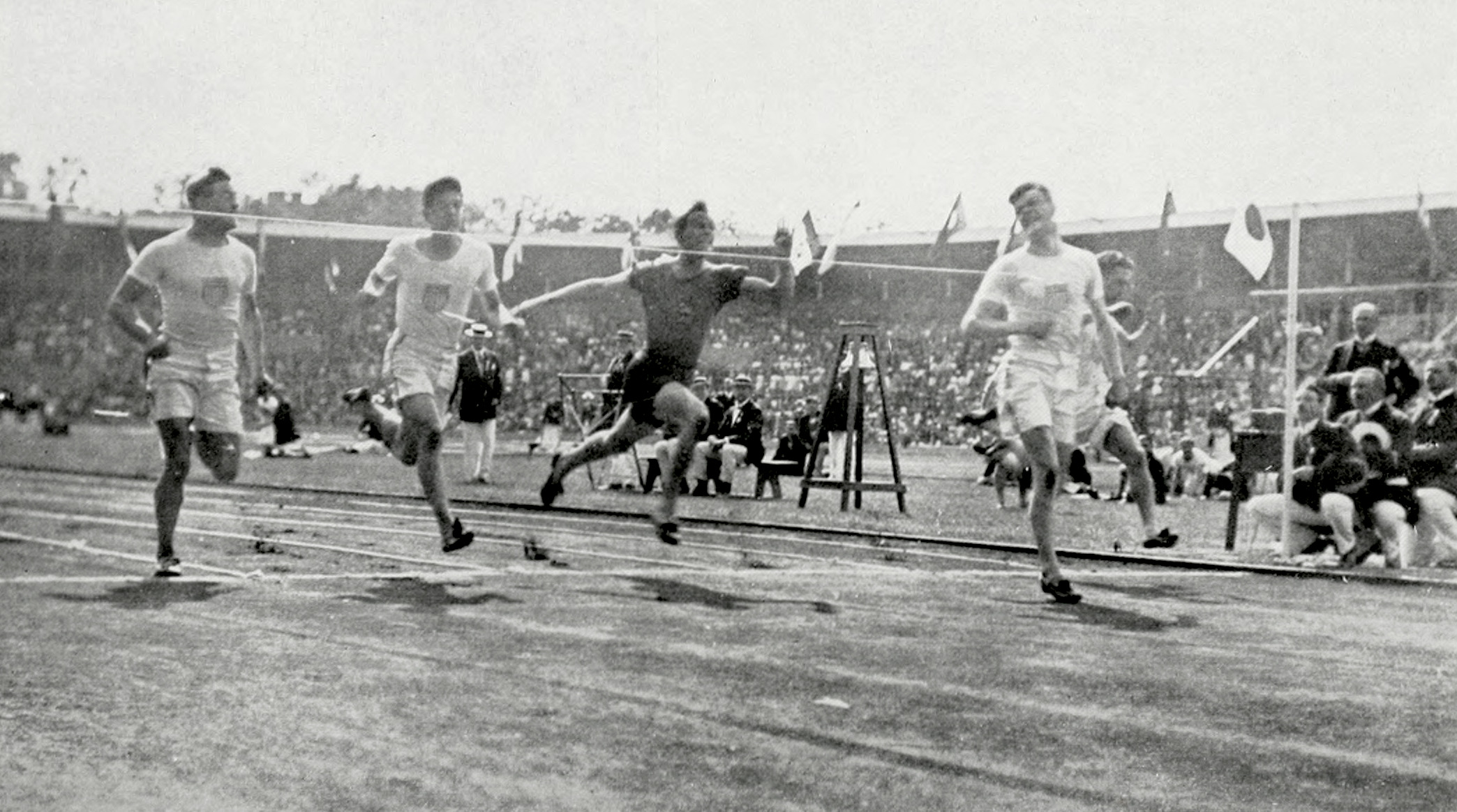
- The finish of the final.
- Venue: Stockholm Olympic Stadium
- Dates: 6–7 July 1912
- Competitors: 70 from 22 nations
- Winning time: 10.8

Medalists
1st place, gold medalist(s)		Ralph Craig	United States
2nd place, silver medalist(s)		Alvah Meyer	United States
3rd place, bronze medalist(s)		Donald Lippincott	United States

The men's 100 metres was a track and field athletics event held as part of the Athletics at the 1912 Summer Olympics programme. It was the fifth appearance of the event, which is one of 12 athletics events to have been held at every Summer Olympics. The competition was held on 6 July 1912 and on 7 July 1912. Seventy runners from 22 nations competed. NOCs could enter up to 12 athletes. The event was won by Ralph Craig of the United States, as the Americans swept the medals for a second time (previously having done so in 1904).

== Background ==
This was the fifth time the event was held, having appeared at every Olympics since the first in 1896. None of the 1908 medalists returned in 1912. Notable entrants included Erwin Kern, Emil Ketterer, and Richard Rau of Germany, who shared the unofficial world record; George Patching of South Africa, the 1912 AAA Championships winner; and United States Olympic Trials winners Ira Courtney, Clement Wilson, and Howard Drew.

Chile (disputed, as Luis Subercaseaux may have run in 1896), Iceland, Japan, Portugal, Russia, and Serbia were represented in the event for the first time. "Australasia" also appeared for the first time, though Australia had previously competed. The United States and Hungary were the only two nations to have appeared at each of the first five Olympic men's 100 metres events.

== Competition format ==
The event maintained the three round format from 1908: heats, semifinals, and a final. This time, however, the top two runners in each of the 17 heats advanced to the semifinals.

These 34 semifinalists (actually 33, as the first heat had only one runner compete) were divided into six semifinal heats, with only the winner in each semifinal advancing to the final.

== Records ==
These were the standing world and Olympic records (in seconds) prior to the 1912 Summer Olympics.

World Record	10.5(*)	(German Empire) Emil Ketterer	Karlsruhe (GER)	July 9, 1911
World Record	10.5(*)	(German Empire) Richard Rau	Braunschweig (GER)	August 13, 1911
World Record	10.5(*)	(German Empire) Richard Rau	Munich (GER)	May 12, 1912
World Record	10.5(*)	(German Empire) Erwin Kern	Munich (GER)	May 26, 1912
Olympic Record	10.8	(United States) Frank Jarvis	Paris (FRA)	July 14, 1900
Olympic Record	10.8	(United States) Walter Tewksbury	Paris (FRA)	July 14, 1900
Olympic Record	10.8	(United States) James Rector	London (GBR)	July 20, 1908
Olympic Record	10.8(**)	(South Africa) Reggie Walker	London (GBR)	July 21, 1908
Olympic Record	10.8	(United States) James Rector	London (GBR)	July 21, 1908
Olympic Record	10.8	(South Africa) Reggie Walker	London (GBR)	July 22, 1908

(*) unofficial

(**) Actual time was 10.7, rounded up to the nearest fifth in accordance with rules in force at the time: this time was thus given as 10 4/5.

The Olympic record for the 100 metres coming into 1912 was 10.8 seconds. It was matched by David Jacobs of Great Britain in the 10th heat before being broken by American Donald Lippincott with 10.6 seconds in the 16th heat. This was also the inaugural official world record in the 100 metres. Three semifinalists (including Lippincott) ran the race in 10.7 seconds, but the new record of 10.6 seconds stood for the rest of the event.

== Results ==
=== Heats ===
All heats were held on Saturday, July 6, 1912.

==== Heat 1 ====
Rank	Athlete	Nation	Time	Notes
1	Charles Luther	Sweden	12.8	Q

==== Heat 2 ====
Möller and Szalay were close at 70 metres; "Möller was stronger in the finish, however, and won by something more than half a metre."

Rank	Athlete	Nation	Time	Notes
1	Ivan Möller	Sweden	11.5	Q
2	Pál Szalay	Hungary		Q
3	Rudolf Rauch	Austria		

==== Heat 3 ====
There was much separation at the top of this heat; Courtney "won without being extended" and Jankovich "was a very easy second."

Rank	Athlete	Nation	Time	Notes
1	Ira Courtney	United States	11.2	Q
2	István Jankovich	Hungary		Q
3	Pierre Failliot	France		
4	Henry Blakeney	Great Britain		
5	Ladislav Jiránek-Strana	Bohemia		
6	Pablo Eitel	Chile		

==== Heat 4 ====
With both runners assured of advancement to the semifinals, they "ran the course very quietly" with Rice "breaking the tape easily ahead of" Smedmark.

Rank	Athlete	Nation	Time	Notes
1	Richard Rice	Great Britain	11.4	Q
2	Rolf Smedmark	Sweden		Q

==== Heat 5 ====
This was a close race between the top two placers, with d'Arcy "shak[ing] off" Povey at the end and winning "by a metre."

Rank	Athlete	Nation	Time	Notes
1	Victor d'Arcy	Great Britain	11.2	Q
2	Reuben Povey	South Africa		Q
3	António Stromp	Portugal		

==== Heat 6 ====
Rau started strongly and led throughout.

Rank	Athlete	Nation	Time	Notes
1	Richard Rau	Germany	11.5	Q
2	Vilmos Rácz	Hungary		Q
3	Ture Person	Sweden		
4	Robert Schurrer	France		
5	Dimitrios Triantafyllakos	Greece		
6	Leopolds Lēvenšteins	Russia		

==== Heat 7 ====
In one of the faster heats, Stewart finished "well in front of [Aelter], who also ran very well."

Rank	Athlete	Nation	Time	Notes
1	William Stewart	Australasia	11.0	Q
2	Léon Aelter	Belgium		Q
3	Charles Lelong	France		
4	Jan Grijseels	Netherlands		
5	Richard Schwarz	Russia		

==== Heat 8 ====
Lindberg won the heat "easily."

Rank	Athlete	Nation	Time	Notes
1	Knut Lindberg	Sweden	11.6	Q
2	Bedřich Vygoda	Bohemia	11.6	Q
3	Dušan Milošević	Serbia	11.6	
4	Jón Halldórsson	Iceland	12.1	

==== Heat 9 ====
Meyer "won without any apparent effort," as Giongo "ran well, although he was not the same class as the American."

Rank	Athlete	Nation	Time	Notes
1	Alvah Meyer	United States	11.6	Q
2	Franco Giongo	Italy		Q
3	Robert Duncan	Great Britain		
4	Georges Rolot	France		

==== Heat 10 ====
Jacobs matched the Olympic record in a tight heat, neck-and-neck with Wilson for most of the way before winning by "a hands-breadth."

Rank	Athlete	Nation	Time	Notes
1	David Jacobs	Great Britain	10.8	Q, =OR
2	Clement Wilson	United States		Q
3	Marius Delaby	France		
4	Herman Sotaaen	Norway		
5	Václav Labík-Gregan	Bohemia		

==== Heat 11 ====
Belote was "a safe winner, after a very quick finish."

Rank	Athlete	Nation	Time	Notes
1	Frank Belote	United States	11.0	Q
2	René Mourlon	France		Q
3	Henry Macintosh	Great Britain		
4	Harry Beasley	Canada		

==== Heat 12 ====
Weinzinger had a good start and led at 25 metres before falling to third. Gerhardt "was clearly the best man."

Rank	Athlete	Nation	Time	Notes
1	Peter Gerhardt	United States	11.2	Q
2	Frank Lukeman	Canada		Q
3	Fritz Weinzinger	Austria		
4	Alexander Pedersen	Norway		
5	Duncan Macmillan	Great Britain		

==== Heat 13 ====
Patching had a false start. The top three men were close, with Patching leading at 85 metres but Howard taking the lead at the end by "the least bit."

Rank	Athlete	Nation	Time	Notes
1	John Howard	Canada	11.0	Q
2	George Patching	South Africa		Q
3	Harold Heiland	United States		
4	Pavel Shtiglits	Russia		
—	Emil Ketterer	Germany	DNF	

==== Heat 14 ====
McConnell led early but faltered at the end; Thomas passed him for the second qualifying spot "just before reaching the post."

Rank	Athlete	Nation	Time	Notes
1	Arthur Anderson	Great Britain	11.0	Q
2	Rupert Thomas	United States		Q
3	Frank McConnell	Canada		
4	Skotte Jacobsson	Sweden		

==== Heat 15 ====
There was a false start. Drew "won easily" with Kern "a pretty good distance behind."

Rank	Athlete	Nation	Time	Notes
1	Howard Drew	United States	11.0	Q
2	Erwin Kern	Germany		Q
3	Julien Boullery	France		
—	James Barker	Great Britain	DNF	

==== Heat 16 ====
There were two false starts in this heat before, on the third try, Lippincott set a new Olympic record and the first official world record. He "led from start to finish, and gave the impression that he would be an easy winner, but Applegarth came on very quickly in the last 20 metres, and Lippincott had to do his very best in order to keep the lead."

Rank	Athlete	Nation	Time	Notes
1	Donald Lippincott	United States	10.6	Q, OR
2	Willie Applegarth	Great Britain		Q
3	Max Herrmann	Germany		
4	Ervin Szerelemhegyi	Hungary		
5	Yahiko Mishima	Japan		

==== Heat 17 ====
Ekberg started well and led through halfway before being passed by Craig and Szobota at around 60 metres. Craig then "won easily" over Szobota.

Rank	Athlete	Nation	Time	Notes
1	Ralph Craig	United States	11.2	Q
2	Ferenc Szobota	Hungary		Q
3	Ragnar Ekberg	Sweden		
4	Fritz Fleischer	Austria		

=== Semifinals ===
All semi-finals were held on Saturday, July 6, 1912.

==== Semifinal 1 ====
Drew "ran magnificently" and used a "powerful, concentrated finish" to become "a safe winner."

Rank	Athlete	Nation	Time	Notes
1	Howard Drew	United States	11.0	Q
2	Ira Courtney	United States		
3	Peter Gerhardt	United States		
4	Charles Luther	Sweden		
5	Erwin Kern	Germany		
6	Vilmos Rácz	Hungary		

==== Semifinal 2 ====
Patching had another false start in this round. Lindberg fell behind early, dropping to fourth place at the halfway mark, but challenged Patching with a "hard spurt" at the end. The distance between the two was too much for him to make up, however.

Rank	Athlete	Nation	Time	Notes
1	George Patching	South Africa	10.9	Q
2	Knut Lindberg	Sweden		
3	Richard Rice	Great Britain		
4	Franco Giongo	Italy		
5	Léon Aelter	Belgium		

==== Semifinal 3 ====
In an event marred by false starts, this semifinal heat was decided by a legal start that one runner thought false. Smedmark was off first, but came to a stop thinking he had false started. The remaining runners saw a "hard struggle between Meyer and Jacobs" with Meyer "strongest in the last 10 metres" to win.

Rank	Athlete	Nation	Time	Notes
1	Alvah Meyer	United States	10.7	Q
2	David Jacobs	Great Britain		
3	Frank Lukeman	Canada		
4	Pál Szalay	Hungary		
—	Rolf Smedmark	Sweden	DNF	

==== Semifinal 4 ====
This semifinal heat featured 9 false starts. Rau led for the first 70 metres before being caught by Craig, who "won by more than a metre."

Rank	Athlete	Nation	Time	Notes
1	Ralph Craig	United States	10.7	Q
2	Richard Rau	Germany	10.9	
3	William Stewart	Australasia		
4	István Jankovich	Hungary		
5	René Mourlon	France		
6	Ferenc Szobota	Hungary		

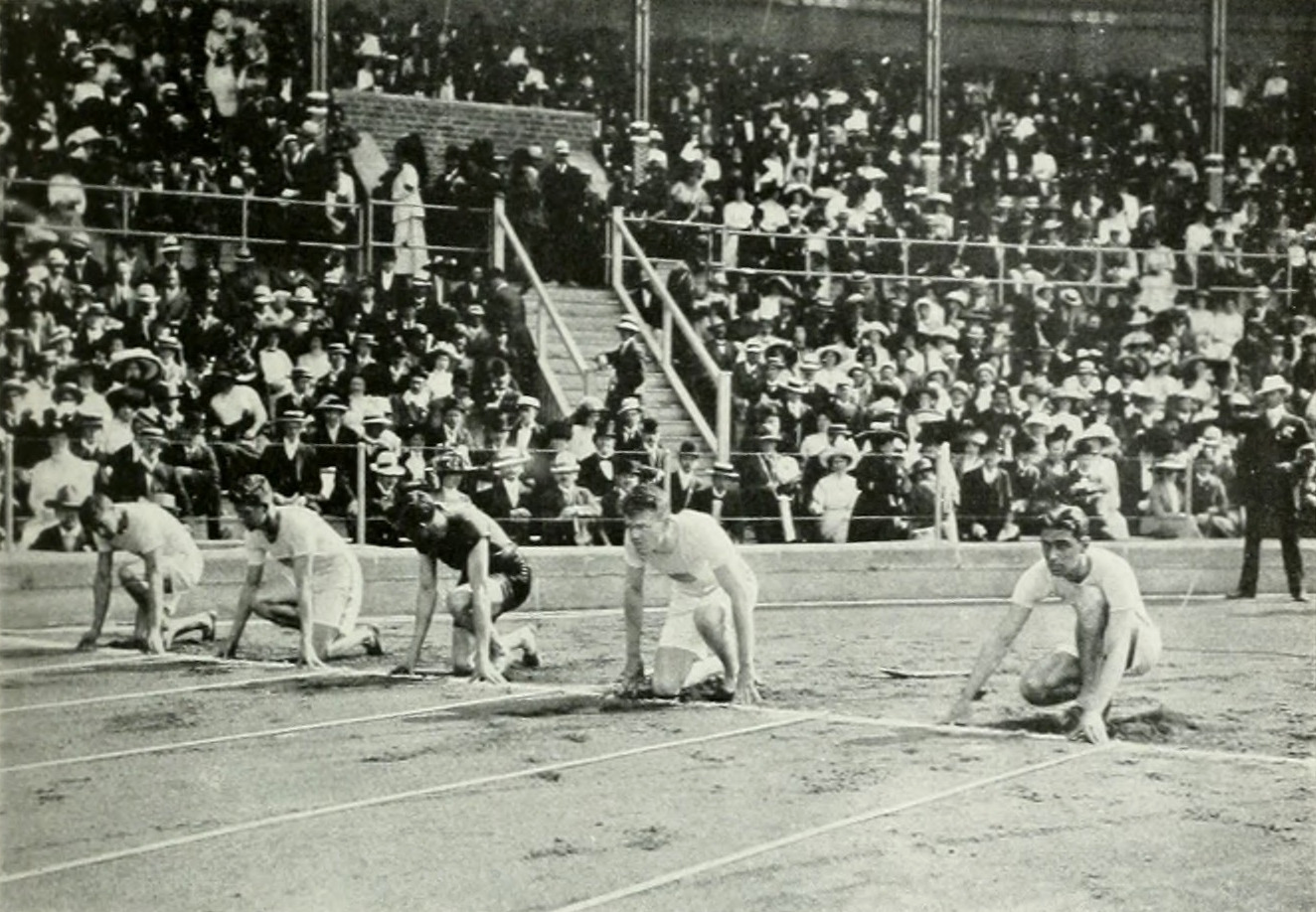
The start of the final.

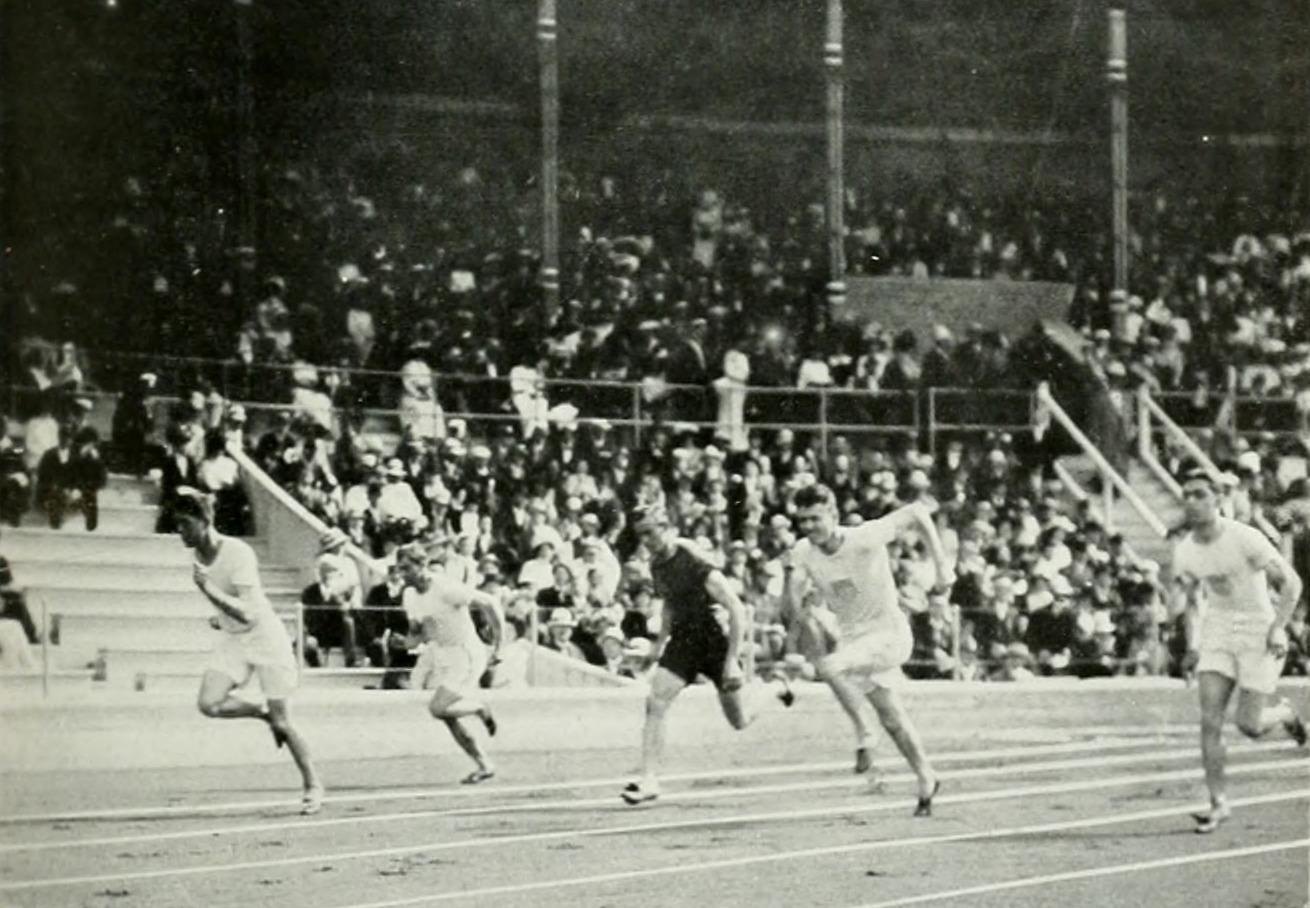
Immediately after the start of the final.

==== Semifinal 5 ====
This heat had a "sharp struggle for the lead during the whole of the race."

Rank	Athlete	Nation	Time	Notes
1	Donald Lippincott	United States	10.7	Q
2	Willie Applegarth	Great Britain		
3	Bedřich Vygoda	Bohemia		
4	Clement Wilson	United States		
5	Victor d'Arcy	Great Britain		
6	John Howard	Canada		

==== Semifinal 6 ====
Belote led throughout.

Rank	Athlete	Nation	Time	Notes
1	Frank Belote	United States	11.1	Q
2	Reuben Povey	South Africa		
3	Rupert Thomas	United States		
4	Ivan Möller	Sweden		
5	Arthur Anderson	Great Britain		

=== Final ===
The final was held on Sunday, July 7, 1912. Drew was forced to scratch from the final after he pulled a tendon at the end of the first semi-final.

The final featured eight false starts, one of which saw Craig and Lippincott fail to hear the recall gun and run to the finish line. On the ninth attempt, Patching had the strongest start and led at 40 metres by half a metre.

Craig caught Patching at 60 metres. At the 75-metre mark, Craig was "a hand's-breadth" ahead of Patching and Meyer, with Lippincott and Belote another half-metre back. At the end, "Craig ran brilliantly and with enormous power." Meyer separated from Patching, who stayed in the third spot until "the last few strides" before being passed "almost on the very line" by Lippincott.

The official report gives the result as Ralph Craig 10 4/5, Alvah Meyer 60 cm behind winner, and Donald Lippincott 15 cm behind second man.

Rank	Athlete	Nation	Time
1st place, gold medalist(s)	Ralph Craig	United States	10.8
2nd place, silver medalist(s)	Alvah Meyer	United States	10.9
3rd place, bronze medalist(s)	Donald Lippincott	United States	10.9
4	George Patching	South Africa	11.0
5	Frank Belote	United States	11.0
—	Howard Drew	United States	DNS
