= Kingston Athletic Club and Polytechnic Harriers =

British athletics club

Kingston & Poly AC
- Founded: 1883
- Ground: Kingsmeadow Athletics Stadium
- Location: Kingston Road, KT1 3PB
- Coordinates: 51°24′17″N 0°17′02″W
- Website: kingstonandpoly.org

The Kingston Athletic Club and Polytechnic Harriers or Kingston & Poly AC for short is an athletic club based in Kingston upon Thames in England.

== History ==
The club was founded by philanthropist Quintin Hogg in 1883, and they were known for four years as the Hanover United AC, and were the athletics arm of Quintin Hogg's Regent Street Polytechnic. The Polytechnic Harriers were based at the Chiswick track and their history with racing events predated "the Poly" since they oversaw walking races from London to Brighton as far back as 1897.

The club has long ties to what is now the London Marathon. In 1908 they oversaw the opening and closing ceremonies for the 1908 Olympics, the Game's marathon, and played a large part in the development of the Polytechnic Marathon, which ran from 1909- 1996.

In 1920, Harry Edward became Great Britain's first Black medalist at the Olympic Games.

In 1985 The Polytechnic Harriers merged with The Royal Borough of Kingston AC, a women's club founded in 1982, to become the Kingston AC and Polytechnic Harriers (Kingston & Poly). The Royal Borough of Kingston AC had been formed when Surrey AC disbanded that year. The male athletes from Surrey AC joined Belgrave Harriers.

The Polytechnic's Kinnaird and Sward Trophies are no longer contested and join the Polytechnic Marathon,which has been superseded by the London Marathon.

Kingston & Poly's men now compete nationally in the British Athletics League and, at area level, the men and women operate jointly in the Southern Athletics League, although they were relegated to lesser divisions in 2016.[10]

== Olympic athletes ==
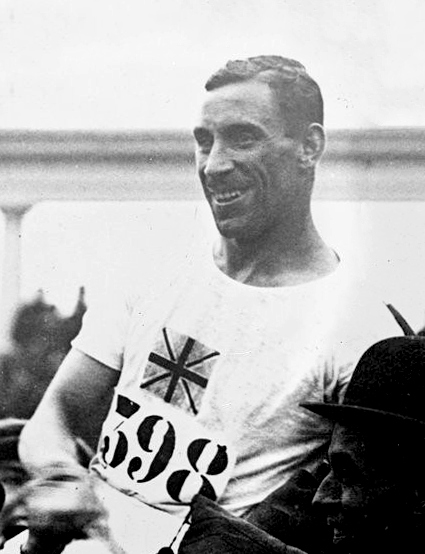
Albert Hill

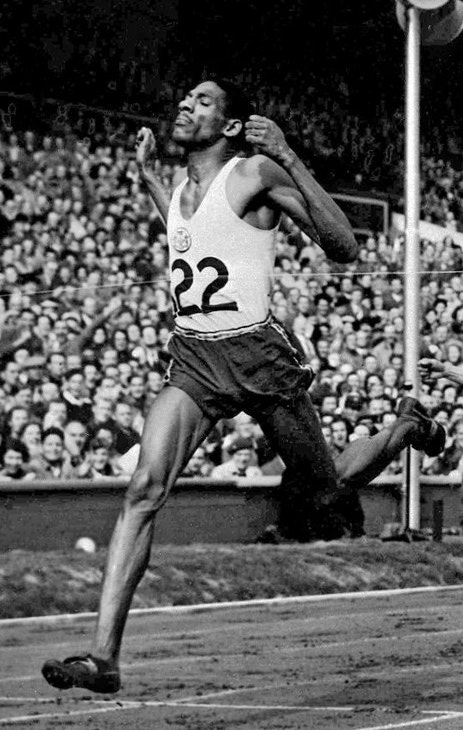
Arthur Wint

Athlete	Club	Games	Medals/Ref
Henry Barrett	Polytechnic Harriers	1908, 1912	
Jack Butler	Polytechnic Harriers	1908	
George Nicol	Polytechnic Harriers	1908, 1912	Bronze medal
James Barrett	Polytechnic Harriers	1908	
Michael Collins	Polytechnic Harriers	1908	
Charlie Davies	Polytechnic Harriers	1908	
Oswald Groenings	Polytechnic Harriers	1908	
George Hawkins	Polytechnic Harriers	1908	
Guy Holdaway	Polytechnic Harriers	1908	
Georg Lind	Polytechnic Harriers	1908	
Henry Murray	Polytechnic Harriers	1908	
Edward Spencer	Polytechnic Harriers	1908	Bronze medal
Jimmy Tremeer	Polytechnic Harriers	1908	Bronze medal
Timothy Carroll	Polytechnic Harriers	1912, 1920	
Willie Applegarth	Polytechnic Harriers	1912	Gold medal Bronze medal
James Barker	Polytechnic Harriers	1912	
Victor d'Arcy	Polytechnic Harriers	1912	Gold medal
Percy Mann	Polytechnic Harriers	1912	
Douglas McNicol	Polytechnic Harriers	1912	
Clive Taylor	Polytechnic Harriers	1912	
Arthur Treble	Polytechnic Harriers	1912	
Larry Cummins	Polytechnic Harriers	1920	Silver medal
Harry Edward	Polytechnic Harriers	1920	Bronze medal Bronze medal
Albert Hill	Polytechnic Harriers	1920	Gold medal Gold medal Silver medal
Eric Robertson	Polytechnic Harriers	1920	
Guy Brockington	Polytechnic Harriers	1924	
Fred Gaby	Polytechnic Harriers	1924, 1928	
John Odde	Polytechnic Harriers	1924	
Richard Ripley	Polytechnic Harriers	1924	Bronze medal
Frederick Chauncy	Polytechnic Harriers	1928	
Cyril Gill	Polytechnic Harriers	1928	Bronze medal
Jack London	Polytechnic Harriers	1928	Silver medal Bronze medal
Arthur Muggridge	Polytechnic Harriers	1928	
Lorna Frampton	Polytechnic Harriers	1936	
Bert Norris	Polytechnic Harriers	1936	
Aubrey Reeve	Polytechnic Harriers	1936	
Stan West	Polytechnic Harriers	1936	
McDonald Bailey	Polytechnic Harriers	1948, 1952	Bronze medal
Paul Crosfield	Polytechnic Harriers	1948	
Charles Denroche	Polytechnic Harriers	1948	
Rene Howell	Polytechnic Harriers	1948	
Stan Jones	Polytechnic Harriers	1948	
Leslie Laing	Polytechnic Harriers	1948, 1952	Gold medal
Ron Pavitt	Polytechnic Harriers	1948, 1952	
Martin Pike	Polytechnic Harriers	1948	
Doug Wilson|	Polytechnic Harriers	1948	
Arthur Wint	Polytechnic Harriers	1948, 1952	Gold medal Gold medal Silver medal Silver medal
Peter Hildreth	Polytechnic Harriers	1952, 1956, 1960	
Brian Shenton	Polytechnic Harriers	1952, 1956	
Jeannette Bailey	Polytechnic Harriers	1960	
Tim Graham	Polytechnic Harriers	1964	
Colin Campbell	Polytechnic Harriers	1968, 1972, 1976	
Alan Pascoe	Polytechnic Harriers	1968, 1972, 1976	

== Archives ==
The Club's archives are still held at the University of Westminster.
