= 1919 AAA Championships =

Outdoor track and field competition

- Dates: 5 July 1919
- Host city: London, England
- Venue: Stamford Bridge (stadium)
- Level: Senior
- Type: Outdoor
- Events: 17

The 1919 AAA Championships was the 1919 edition of the annual outdoor track and field competition organised by the Amateur Athletic Association (AAA). It was held on Saturday 5 July 1919 at the Stamford Bridge Stadium in London, England.

The Championships consisted of 17 events. The triple jump, javelin and discus throw were not held.

== Impact of WWI ==
The Championships returned after missing four years due to World War I. Many former AAA champions or medal winners who would have competed at the 1919 Championships had been killed in action from 1914 to 1918 as a result or cause of the war. They included -

- Gerard Anderson
- Henry Ashington
- (Germany) Hanns Braun
- (Finland) Juho Halme
- George Hutson
- Henry Alan Leeke
- (Germany) Georg Mickler
- (Hungary) Imre Mudin
- Alan Patterson
- Kenneth Powell
- Albert Rowland
- Clive Taylor
- Richard Yorke

== Results ==
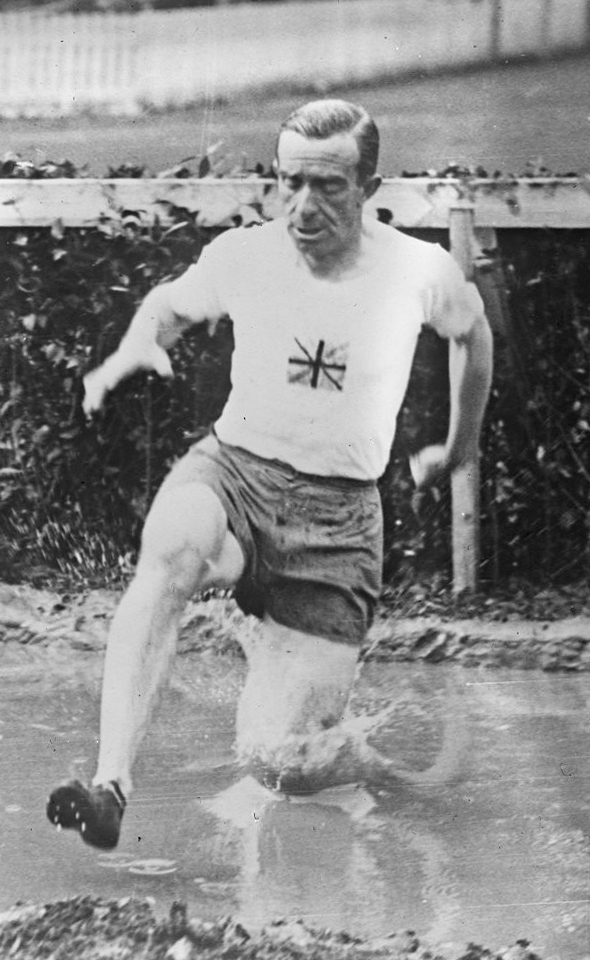
Percy Hodge

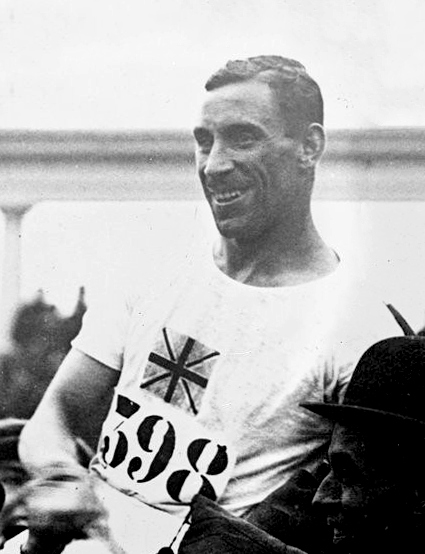
Albert Hill

Event	Gold		Silver		Bronze	
100 yards	William Hill	10.0	(New Zealand) Jack Lindsay	½ yd	Victor d'Arcy	inches
220 yards	William Hill	22.6	Harry Edward	1-5 yd	(New Zealand) Jack Lindsay	1 yd
440 yards	Guy Butler	49.8	(Sweden) Nils Engdahl	¾-1½ yd	(Wales) Cecil Griffiths	2 yd
880 yards	Albert Hill	1:55.2	(Sweden) Anatole Bolin	1:58.6	Percy Sweet	1:59.8
1 mile	Albert Hill	4:21.2	(Sweden) Sven Lundgren	4:26.2	John Quinn	4:28.8
4 miles	(Sweden) Eric Backman	19:56.4	Ernest Glover	20:19.0	E. J. Rogers	20:39.4
10 miles	Joe Blewitt	53:45.6	Walter Monk	55:46.6	(France) Ahmed Djebelia	56:16.4
2 miles steeplechase	Percy Hodge	11:53.6	(Republic of Ireland) Larry Cummins	12:04.0	Jack Cruise	12:16.4
120y hurdles	(New Zealand) Harry Wilson	15.8	George Gray	3 yd	(New Zealand) Gerald Keddell	1 yd
440y hurdles	George Gray	59.8	Joseph English	8-15 yd	Laurence Pullar	
2 miles walk	Bobby Bridge	14:18.4	(Denmark) Gunnar Rasmussen	14:28.8	J. W. Dowse	14:29.8
7 miles walk	William Hehir	53:23.6	Charles Dowson	53:31.2	J. W. Dowse	54:37.6
high jump	Benjamin Howard Baker	1.803	(Sweden) Georg Högström	1.778	(Republic of Ireland) Tim Carroll	1.753
pole jump	(Sweden) Georg Högström	3.35	(Denmark) Henry Petersen	3.27	only 2 competitors	
long jump	(Sweden) William Petersson	7.18	(Canada) Le Roy Haliburton	6.79	(Australia) Ethelbert Southee	6.72
shot put	(Sweden) Bertil Jansson	12.98	Rex Woods	12.25	A. Hamilton	10.78
hammer throw	(Denmark) Einar Midtgaard	44.00	John Freeborn	34.80	only 2 competitors	
