= 1914 AAA Championships =

Outdoor track and field competition

- Dates: 3–4 July 1914
- Host city: London, England
- Venue: Stamford Bridge (stadium)
- Level: Senior
- Type: Outdoor
- Events: 20

The 1914 AAA Championships was the 1914 edition of the annual outdoor track and field competition organised by the Amateur Athletic Association (AAA). It was held from 3–4 July 1914 at the Stamford Bridge (stadium) in London, England. The attendance was described as a record attendance of around 13,000, despite estimates that were higher the year previous.

The Championships consisted of 20 events and covered two days of competition for the first time, following the introduction of four new events. The new disciplines introduced were the 440 yards hurdles, javelin throw, discus throw and triple jump. It was also the last Championships for five years due to the outbreak of war shortly after the 1914 championships.

== Results ==
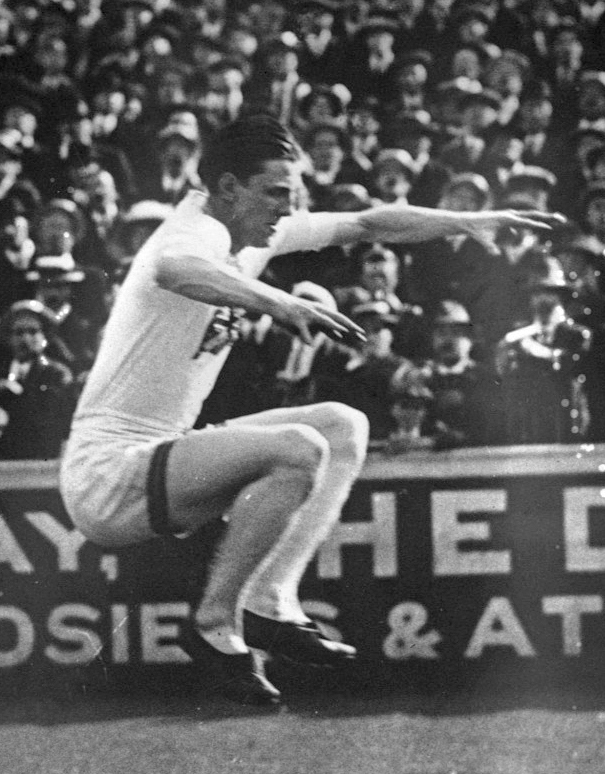
Philip Kingsford

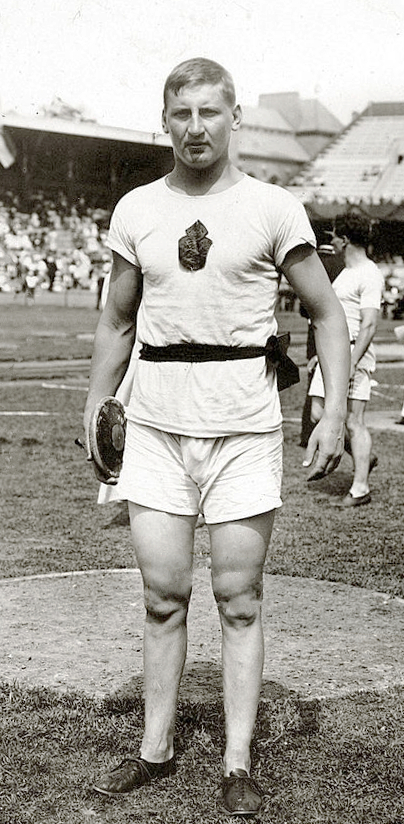
Armas Taipale

Event	Gold		Silver		Bronze	
100 yards	Willie Applegarth	10.0	Clive Taylor	2 ft	Victor d'Arcy	2 yd
220 yards	Willie Applegarth	21.2 WR	Victor d'Arcy	4½ yd	John Rooney	2½ yd
440 yards	Cyril Seedhouse	50.0	Andrew Mitchell	2½ yd	(United States) Homer Baker	1 yd
880 yards	(United States) Homer Baker	1:54.4	Albert Hill	3 yd	Rollo Atkinson	2 yd
1 mile	George Hutson	4:22.0	Samuel Wood	5 yd	(Scotland) Duncan McPhee	½ yd
4 miles	George Hutson	19:41.2	Alfred Nichols	19:50.0	Cliff Price	19:57.0
10 miles	Thomas Fennah	53:33.4	(Leinster) John Ireland Daly	54:10.2	Cliff Price	54:39.2
2 miles steeplechase	Sydney Frost	11:10.6	Jack Cruise	30-50 yd	Charles Ruffell	8-12 yd
120y hurdles	George Gray	15.8	(United States) William Potter	2 ft	Kenneth Powell	1 ft
440y hurdles	Joseph English	59.8	Harry Blakeney	10 yd	Percy Smith	30 yd
2 miles walk	Bobby Bridge	13:57.2	William Hehir	14:20.0	Jack Lynch	14:25.0
7 miles walk	Bobby Bridge	52:32.0	Jack Lynch	53:06.6	William Hehir	55:14.6
high jump	(United States) Wesley Oler	1.892	Benjamin Howard Baker	1.880	(United States) John Simons	1.829
pole jump	(Sweden) Richard Sjöberg	3.40	(Leinster) Tim Leahy	3.20	A. Anderson	2.74
long jump	Philip Kingsford	7.09	T. F. Garnier	6.78	E. T. Concannon	6.61
triple jump	(Sweden) Ivar Sahlin	14.03	(Finland) Juho Halme	14.02	(Sweden) Erik Almlöf	13.80
shot put	(Finland) Armas Taipale	13.60	(United States) Hugh Harbison	13.27	(Hungary) Imre Mudin	13.26
discus throw	(Finland) Armas Taipale	44.04	(Leinster) Patrick Quinn	38.12	(Hungary) Sándor Toldi	37.50
hammer throw	(Sweden) Carl Johan Lind	49.77	(Scotland) Tom Nicolson	49.59	(Leinster) Denis Carey	45.08
javelin throw	(Hungary) Mór Kóczán	59.72	(Finland) Juho Halme	59.05	(Denmark) Jorgen Kornerup-Bang	52.87
