= William Stewart (athlete) =

Australian sprinter (1889–1958)

Personal information
- Nationality: Australian
- Born: 22 October 1889 Launceston, Tasmania, Australia
- Died: 29 April 1958 (aged 68) Monegeetta, Victoria, Australia

Sport
- Sport: Sprinting
- Event: 100 yards/metres
- Club: London Athletic Club

William Allan Stewart (22 October 1889 – 29 April 1958) was an Australian sprinter who competed at the Olympic Games.

== Biography ==
Stewart finished third in the 100 yards event at the British 1911 AAA Championships and returned to compete in the 1912 AAA Championships, where he finished third behind South African George Patching.

Shortly after the 1912 AAA Championships, Stewart competed in the men's 100 metres at the 1912 Summer Olympics.

Stewart once again competed in the British AAA Championships and finished third behind Willie Applegarth in the 100 yards event at the 1913 AAA Championships.

Eligible by descent, in 1913 and 1914 Stewart represented the Scotland rugby union team in the annual Five Nations series.
