= 1910 AAA Championships =

Outdoor track and field competition

- Dates: 2 July 1910
- Host city: London, England
- Venue: Stamford Bridge (stadium)
- Level: Senior
- Type: Outdoor
- Events: 16

The 1910 AAA Championships was the 1910 edition of the annual outdoor track and field competition organised by the Amateur Athletic Association (AAA). It was held on Saturday 2 July 1910 at the Stamford Bridge (stadium) in London, England.

The Championships consisted of 16 events.

== Results ==
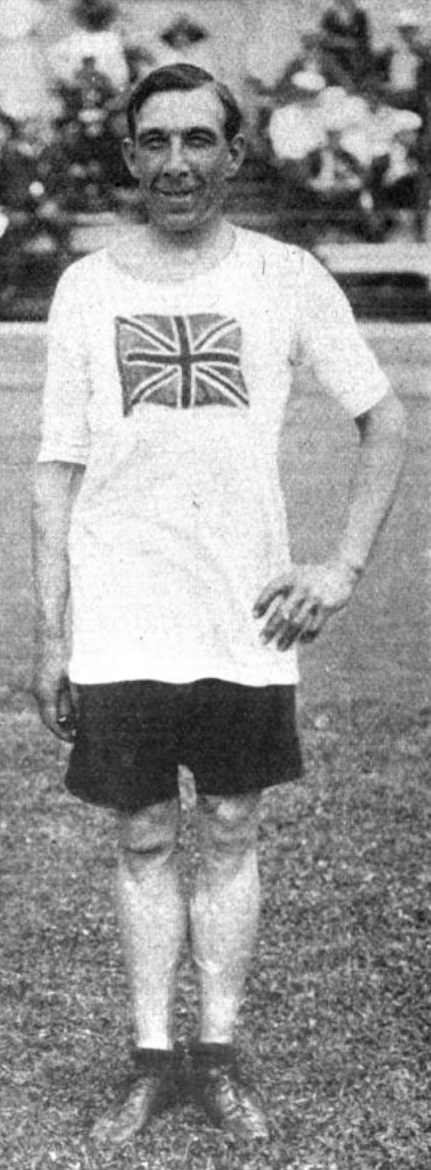
Ernest Webb successfully defended both of his walk titles

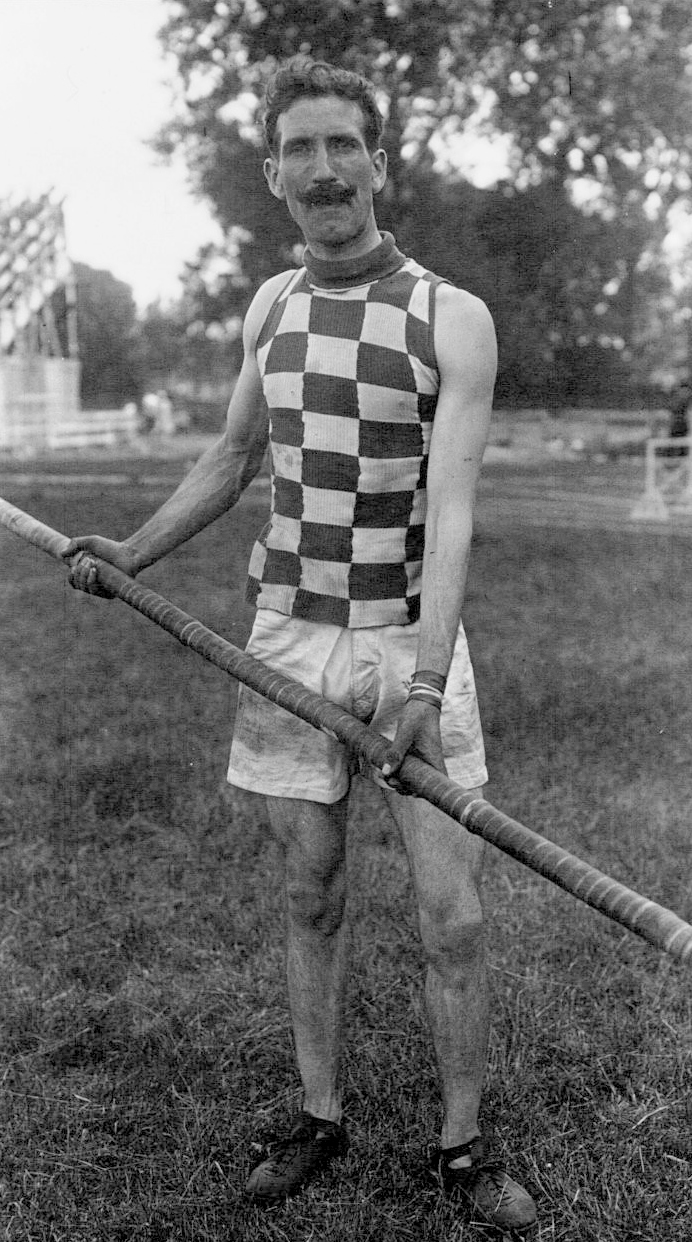
Paul Lagarde runner-up in the Pole jump

Event	Gold		Silver		Bronze	
100 yards	(United States) Frederick L. Ramsdell	10.4	(South Africa) Reginald Walker	1 ft	Willie Applegarth	2 yd
220 yards	(United States) Frederick L. Ramsdell	22.4	Ernest Haley	inches	John Wells	3 yd
440 yards	Lionel Reed	51.0	Edward Ryle	2 ft	(Wales) David Jacobs	3 yd
880 yards	(Leinster) James Hill	2:01.4	Eddie Owen	1½ yd	(Scotland) Dougles McNicol	1 yd
1 mile	Emil Voigt	4:26.2	Eddie Owen	3 yd	(Scotland) Douglas McNicol	5 yd
4 miles	Albert Hill	20:00.6	William Scott	20:03.4	Whit Norgrove	20:35.4
10 miles	(Leinster) Francis O'Neill	52:41.4	William Scott	52:41.8	Frank Reay	52:58.0
steeplechase	Joseph English	11:11.6	Reginald Noakes	5-6 yd	Sydney Frost	
120yd hurdles	Gerard Anderson	16.0	Alfred Healey	inches	Kenneth Powell	1 yd
2 miles walk	Ernest Webb	13:54.4	Harold Ross	13:58.6	R. Steels	14:21.0
7 miles walk	Ernest Webb	51:37.0	Alfred Pateman	54:17.4	Will Ovens	54:21.0
high jump	Benjamin Howard Baker	1.753	Clive Taylor	1.727	only 2 competitors	
pole jump	(Hungary) Kálmán Szathmáry	3.54	(France) Paul Lagarde	3.20	Joseph Young	3.15
long jump	(Leinster) Percy Kirwan	6.72	Edward Paget-Tomlinson	6.52	(Hungary) Kálmán Szathmáry	6.36
shot put	(Leinster) Denis Horgan	13.03	Henry Alan Leeke	11.20	(Scotland) Wilfred Bleaden	10.49
hammer throw	Alf Flaxman	35.80	Henry Alan Leeke	33.97	only 2 competitors	
