= Donald Lippincott =

American olympic athlete (1893-1962)

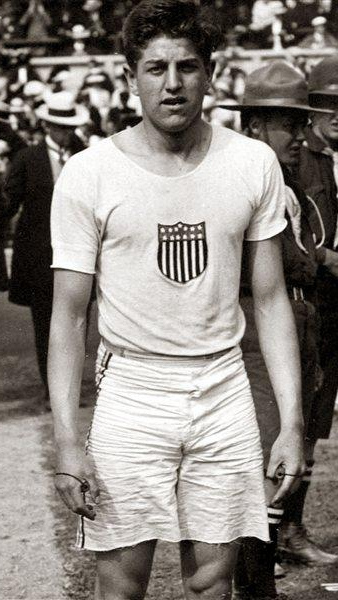
- Donald Lippincott at the 1912 Olympics

Personal information
- Nationality: American
- Born: November 16, 1893 Philadelphia, Pennsylvania, U.S.
- Died: January 9, 1962 (aged 68)
- Height: 178 cm / 5 ft 10 in
- Weight: 72 kg / 159 lb

Sport
- Sport: Running
- Events: 100 meters, 200 meters
- College team: Penn Quakers

Achievements and titles
- Personal bests: 100m – 10.6 s, WR (1912); 100 y – 9.6 s, WR (1913); 200 m – 21.8 s (1912); 220 y – 21.2 s, WR= straight track (1913); 4×440y – 3:18.0, WR (1915)
Medal record
Representing the United States
Olympic Games
Silver medal – second place	1912 Stockholm	200 metres
Bronze medal – third place	1912 Stockholm	100 metres

Donald Fithian Lippincott (November 16, 1893 – January 9, 1962) was an American Olympic athlete who competed in the 1912 Summer Olympics in Stockholm, Sweden. He won a bronze medal in the 100 metres and a silver medal in the 200 metres.

Lippincott was the first record holder in 100 metres to be recognized by the International Amateur Athletics Federation. He set the world record in a heat of 100 metres at the 1912 Olympics.

== Early life and education ==
Lippincott was born November 16, 1893, in Philadelphia into a wealthy banking family. He was a student at Episcopal Academy and entered the University of Pennsylvania in 1911. He was a member of the Delta Kappa Epsilon fraternity and the Sphinx Senior Society. He graduated from the Wharton school at Penn with a degree in Economics in 1915.

== College track career ==
In 1913, he tied the world record for the 100 yard dash at 9.6 seconds and tied Ralph Craig's record for 220 yard dash (straight track) at 21.2 seconds. In 1915, he was a member of the Penn 4×440 yard relay team that set a new world record of 3:18.0.

Lippincott also had a time recorded for 440 yard dash of 48.0 seconds although the time is considered suspect.

He was a member of the varsity track team that was the dominant force in college track and field at the time, winning 3 Intercollegiate association of Amateur Athletics of America (IC4A) championships in 4 years in the period 1910–13. The team was coached by Mike Murphy who died in 1913. It is said Lippincott ran the 220 yard dash in world record time to guarantee Murphy his last championship. In 1915, Lippincott was named captain of the track team.

== 1912 Olympics ==
Lippincott was identified as an Olympic talent as a freshman at Penn and was offered a place on the Olympics team if he could fund his own travel.

His mother tried to stop him from participating as she was worried about his sea voyage to Europe following the sinking of the Titanic only months before. She tried to persuade Lippincott's father to write his son a letter stating that the family business was struggling and no money for travel would be forthcoming. In the end he did raise the sponsorship money from Penn alumni and his parents relented.

In 1912, the USA Olympic trials consisted of 3 area meets (Western, Central and Eastern) that served as guides for team selection by the USOC and the AAU in conjunction. Lippincott ran in the Eastern trials (held in Cambridge, Massachusetts, on June 8) finishing fourth in the 100 m final but was eliminated at the semi-final stage in the 200 m. In the end, Lippincott was one of eleven American athletes selected for the 100 metres. (Note: From the 1920 Olympics, a maximum of 4 athletes could be selected in a single event, which was changed in 1932 to the present maximum of 3.)

=== 100 metres ===
Lippincott set the world record in heat 16 of the 100 metres. Richard Rau was considered to have the then unofficial world's best time of 10.5 s but this had not been properly ratified. The time was actually quoted as 10 3/5 seconds, as the hand watches of the day recorded race times in 1/5 (0.2) second increments. Lippincott would remain world record holder for eight years without peers (in 1920 Jackson Scholz gained a share of the record, and in 1921 Charlie Paddock recorded a new record of 10.4 seconds.)

In the 100 metres final itself there were seven false starts, one of which led to both Lippincott and the eventual winner Ralph Craig sprinting the whole length of the track. To relieve his tension at the start, Lippincott squeezed a cork that is still in the family's possession.

When the race finally got underway, George Patching from South Africa (the only non-American in the final) led until halfway, where the three Americans Craig, Lippincott and Alvah Meyer drew level. Craig then drew ahead, but it was a blanket finish and the crowd was unsure who had won. So it was left to the judges to announce the final result, Craig first, Meyer second and Lippincott third.

=== 200 metres ===
In the 200 m final, Craig won gold and Lippincott won silver.

== Later life ==
After graduation in 1915, Lippincott served as a lieutenant in the US Navy during World War I. After the war, he went into banking in Philadelphia and worked as a broker with Bache & Co. and Merrill Lynch.

Lippincott supported his alma mater, the University of Pennsylvania, as the president of the Class of 1915. He helped to establish the "Class of ’15 Award" for the male student who excelled best both athletically and academically. He also helped to establish the annual football club dinner.

He died January 9, 1962, and was interred at West Laurel Hill Cemetery in Bala Cynwyd, Pennsylvania.

== Personal life ==
He was married and had 4 children.

== Sources ==
- Quercetani, R. L. & Pallicca, G. (2006) A World History of Sprint Racing 1850–2005, SEP Editrice Srl, ISBN 978-88-87110-75-3.
