= Belote (disambiguation) =

Belote may refer to:

== Card games ==
- Belote, a card game popular in France

== People ==
- Frank Belote, an American track and field athlete who competed in the 1912 Summer Olympics
- Melissa Belote, an American swimmer and gold medalist form the 1972 Olympics
