= Clive Taylor (athlete) =

British high jumper

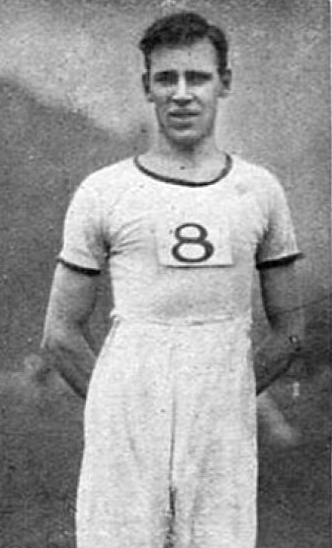

Personal information
- Nationality: British (English)
- Born: 8 May 1891 Kidsgrove, Staffordshire, England
- Died: 25 February 1917 (aged 25) France

Sport
- Sport: Athletics
- Event: High Jump
- Club: Polytechnic Harriers; Surrey AC

Clive Wailes Taylor (8 May 1891 – 25 February 1917) was a British athlete who was selected for the 1912 Summer Olympics.

== Biography ==
Taylor was born in Kidsgrove, Staffordshire, one of six children. He was educated at Polytechnic Day School. Aged 16 he gained work at his local post office before working in the London Post Office Savings Bank Department.

He was a member of the Polytechnic Harriers and won the 1910 Northern Counties high jump title before finishing runner-up in the high jump event behind Benjamin Howard Baker at the 1910 AAA Championships. Two years later was once again runner-up behind Baker at the 1912 AAA Championships.

He was selected to represent Great Britain at the 1912 Summer Olympics in Stockholm for the high jump and standing high jump events. It is not clear as to why he did not start the events.

Taylor was also a runner and in 1913, he was part of the Polytechnic Harriers team that broke the world record for the mile relay. His all-round athleticism was displayed at the 1914 AAA Championships, when he finished second to Willie Applegarth in the 100 yards. He was running for Surrey Athletic Club at this stage.

His career and life was cut short when he died during World War I in a French hospital of injuries sustained. He served with the Royal Fusiliers and was a second lieutenant and was awarded the Military Cross.
