= James Barker (athlete) =

British athlete (1892–1947)

Personal information
- Full name: James Jeffrey Barker
- Born: 6 November 1892 Ilkeston, England
- Died: 18 October 1947 (aged 54) Birmingham, England

Sport
- Sport: Athletics
- Event: Sprints
- Club: Polytechnic Harriers

James Jeffrey Barker (6 November 1892 – 18 October 1947) was a British track and field athlete who competed in the 1912 Summer Olympics.

== Career ==
Barker was selected to represent Great Britain in the 100 metres competition at the 1912 Olympic Games in Stockholm, Sweden. He was eliminated in the first round.

The following year, Barker finished second behind Willie Applegarth in the 100 yards event at the 1913 AAA Championships.

== Other achievements ==
- Midland Countries
  - 100 yards winner 1911–14 and 1919
  - 220 yards winner 1913 and 1914
- Meeting in Berlin 1913
  - 100 metres winner, beating Victor d'Arcy and Applegarth

== Personal bests ==
- 100 yards – 10.2 (1913)
- 100 metres – 10.9 (1913)
- 220 yards – 23.4 (1913)
