= 1913 AAA Championships =

Outdoor track and field competition

- Dates: 5 July 1913
- Host city: London, England
- Venue: Stamford Bridge (stadium)
- Level: Senior
- Type: Outdoor
- Events: 16

The 1913 AAA Championships was the 1913 edition of the annual outdoor track and field competition organised by the Amateur Athletic Association (AAA). It was held on Saturday 5 July 1913 at the Stamford Bridge (stadium) in London, England. The attendance was described as a record attendance of around 13,000, despite estimates that were higher the year previous.

The Championships consisted of 16 events but the steeplechase event was standardised at the distance of 2 miles for the first time.

== Results ==
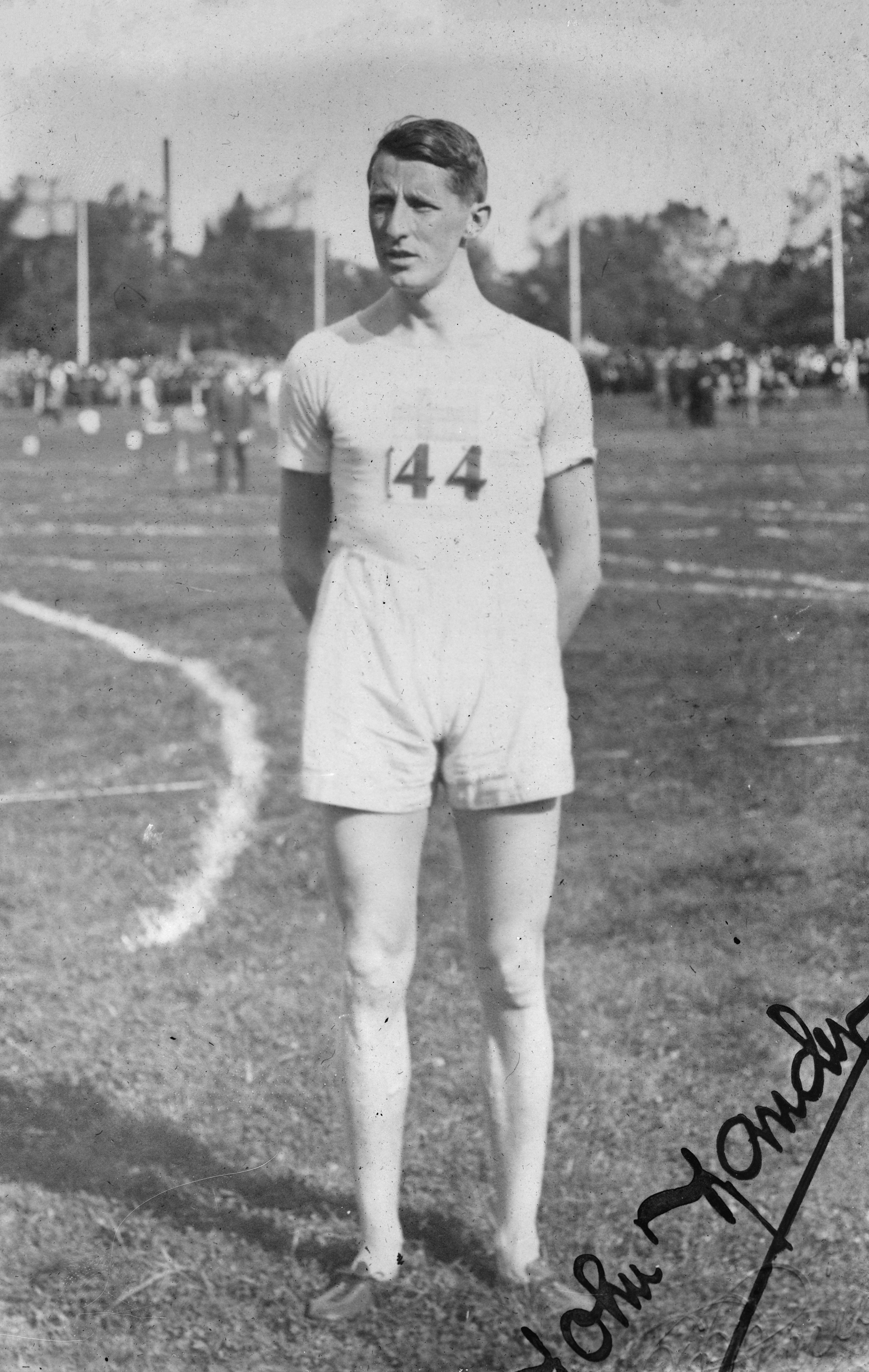
John Zander

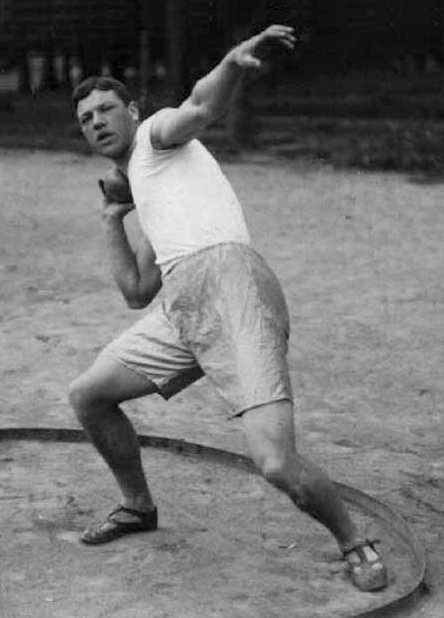
Einar Nilsson

Event	Gold		Silver		Bronze	
100 yards	Willie Applegarth	10.0	James Barker	1½ yd	(Australia) William Stewart	1 ft
220 yards	Willie Applegarth	21.6 NR	Victor d'Arcy	3-6 yd	(Germany) Richard Rau	1 yd
440 yards	George Nicol	49.4	(Wales) David Jacobs	6 yd	Ernest Haley	6-8 yd
880 yards	(Sweden) Ernst Wilde	2:00.6	Cyril Frisby	1-2 yd	(Leinster) James Hill	½ yd
1 mile	(Sweden) John Zander	4:25.8	Gerald Gorringe	8 yd	(Germany) Georg Mickler	inches
4 miles	George Hutson	19:32.0	Ernest Glover	19:43.0	(Sweden) Gustav Karlsson	20:10.2
10 miles	Ernest Glover	51:56.8	Harry Baldwin	52:44.4	W. J. Tucker	53:44.8
2 miles steeplechase	Charles Ruffell	11:03.6	Jack Cruise	11:13.2	Thomas Lee	11:20.0
120yd hurdles	George Gray	16.0	Kenneth Powell	½ yd	(Sweden) Gösta Holmér	1-2½ yd
2 miles walk	Bobby Bridge	13:51.8	Harold Ross	14:01.8	Jack Lynch	14:18.8
7 miles walk	Bobby Bridge; Harold Ross	52:08.4	not awarded		Jack Lynch	53:19.0
high jump	Benjamin Howard Baker	1.829	(Sweden) Anders Petterson	1.778	(Sweden) Inge Lindholm	1.727
pole jump	(Sweden) Clas Gille	3.68	(Sweden) Carl Hårleman	3.58	(France) Fernand Gonder	3.50
long jump	Sidney Abrahams	6.86	(Sweden) Inge Lindholm	6.61	(France) André Campana	6.59
shot put	(Sweden) Einar Nilsson	14.44	(France) André Tison	13.16	(Leinster) James Barrett	13.09
hammer throw	(Sweden) Carl Johan Lind	47.43	(Sweden) Nils Linde	46.04	Alf Flaxman	41.87
