= George Gray (hurdler) =

British hurdler

Personal information
- Nationality: British (English)
- Born: 25 December 1887 Chesterton, England
- Died: 11 December 1978 (aged 90) Stockport, England

Sport
- Sport: Track and field
- Event: Hurdles
- Club: Salford Harriers

George Henry Gray (25 December 1887 – 11 December 1970) was a British hurdler who competed at the 1920 Summer Olympics.

== Career ==
Gray finished second behind Gerard Anderson in the 120 yards hurdles event at the 1912 AAA Championships.

Gray became the National sprint hurdles champion after winning the 1913 AAA Championships title and successfully defended his title the following year at the 1914 AAA Championships.

After the war, Gray became the National 440 yards hurdles national champion at the 1919 AAA Championships and was also the highest placed British athlete in the 120 yards hurdles at both the 1919 AAA Championships and the 1920 AAA Championships.

Shortly after the 1920 AAA Championships, Gray competed in the men's 110 metres hurdles at the 1920 Summer Olympics, in Stockholm, Sweden.
