= Carl Hårleman (gymnast) =

Swedish gymnast

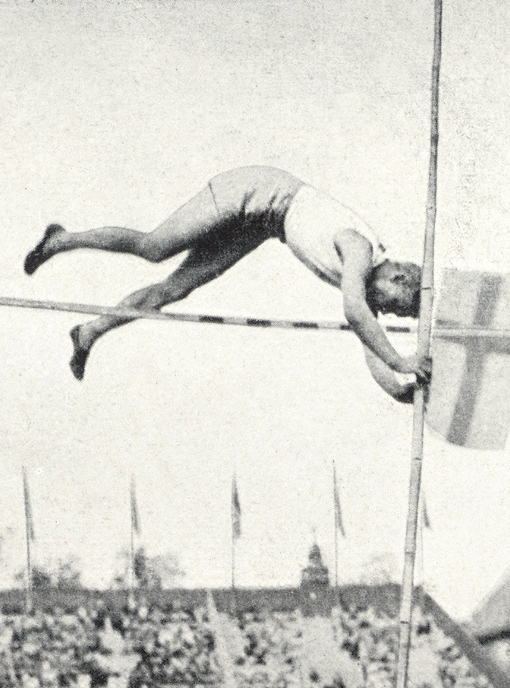
- Hårleman c. 1912

Personal information
- Born: 23 June 1886 Västerås, United Kingdoms of Sweden and Norway
- Died: 20 August 1948 (aged 62) Halmstad, Sweden
- Height: 1.71 m (5 ft 7 in)

Gymnastics career
- Discipline: Men's artistic gymnastics
- Country represented: Sweden
- Club: Västerås Gymnastikförening; Idrottsföreningen Kamraterna Falun
Medal record
Men's artistic gymnastics
Representing Sweden
Olympic Games
Gold medal – first place	1908 London	Team

Carl Hårleman (23 June 1886 – 20 August 1948) was a Swedish gymnast and track and field athlete who competed in the 1908 and 1912 Summer Olympics.

== Career ==
At the 1908 Olympic Games, he was part of the Swedish gymnastics team that won the all-around gold medal. Four years later in 1912, he finished twelfth in the pole vault competition at his home Olympics in Stockholm, Sweden.

The following year, he finished second behind fellow Swede Clas Gille in the pole jump event at the British 1913 AAA Championships.

In 1917, he won the Swedish pole vault title and set a national record that stood until 1921. His personal bests in athletics were 3.90 m in the pole vault (1917) and 5809 in the decathlon (1912).

Hårleman was born into a noble family. He worked in insurance, served in the Swedish Army, reached the rank of captain, and acted as secretary-general of several sports associations.

== See also ==
- Dual sport and multi-sport Olympians
