= Rupert Thomas =

American sprinter

Personal information
- Born: November 21, 1890 Kansas City, Missouri, United States
- Died: February 28, 1956 (aged 65) Flushing, New York, United States

Sport
- Sport: Sprinting
- Event: 100 metres

Rupert Thomas (November 21, 1890 – February 28, 1956) was an American sprinter. He competed in the men's 100 metres at the 1912 Summer Olympics.
