= J. Ira Courtney =

American sportsman

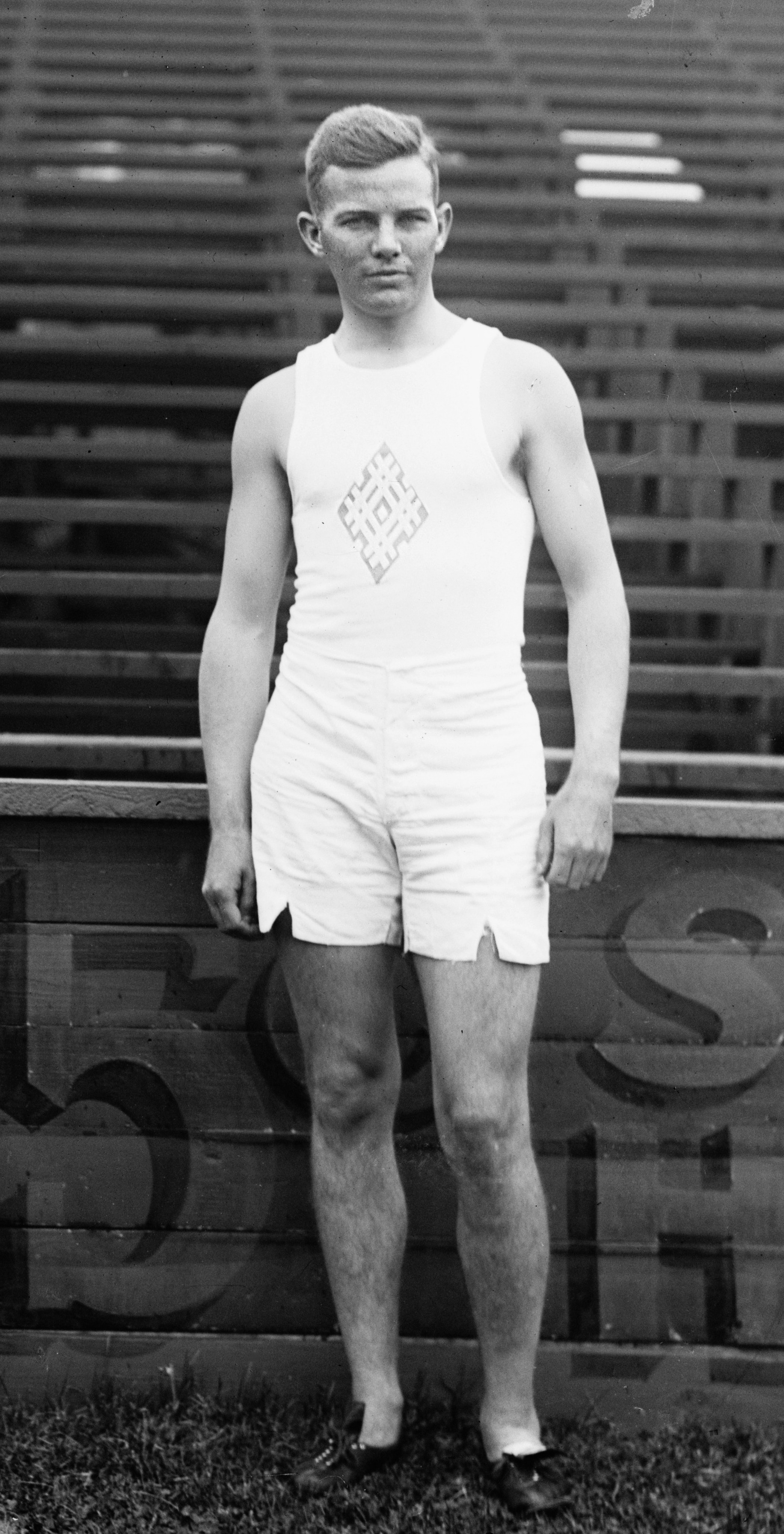
- Ira Courtney c. 1912

Personal information
- Born: April 27, 1889 Minneapolis, Minnesota, United States
- Died: April 15, 1968 (aged 78) Fontana, California, United States
- Education: Phillips Exeter Academy, University of Washington, University of Southern California
- Height: 1.80 m (5 ft 11 in)
- Weight: 72 kg (159 lb)

Sport
- Sport: Athletics
- Event(s): 100 m, 200 m
- Club: Seattle Athletic Club

Achievements and titles
- Personal best(s): 100 m – 10.8 (1912); 200 m – 21.8 (1912)

John Ira Courtney (April 27, 1889 – April 15, 1968) was an American sprinter who competed at the 1912 Summer Olympics in the 100 m, 200 m and 4 × 100 m relay events. In 1909–1914, he won several championships as a sprinter and hurdler and later became a handball player.

== Early years ==
J. Ira Courtney was born in Minneapolis, Minnesota. According to Jim Daves, the author of The Glory of Washington (his book about the University of Washington), it was there that young Ira first discovered his talent for sprinting when he and his brother outran some policemen when they were caught filching fruit in an orchard. After moving with his family to Seattle, Washington, Courtney competed on the Broadway High School track team. In 1909, he was the captain of Washington’s West Side Team in the state championship meet, where he won the low hurdles, and all three sprinting events, setting a new state record in the 220-yard dash of 22 and one-fifth of a second. (This was in the days long before modern technology, which now allows races to be recorded in one-hundredths of a second.) He also competed on Broadway’s swimming, baseball, and football teams. Courtney's victory in the 220-yard low hurdles on May 1, 1909, was the decisive race in Broadway's one-point victory over cross-town rival Lincoln High School. Later that year, he competed in track events for the Seattle Athletic Club.

== College career ==
In 1910, Courtney attended the Phillips Exeter Academy in Exeter, New Hampshire, where he equaled the interscholastic record in the 40-yard dash of 4 and 3/5 of a second while competing on a wooden track at the snow-bound college. In 1911, Courtney returned to Seattle and enrolled at the University of Washington, where his sprinting speed continued to improve. After a number of impressive victories in the spring of 1912, a growing movement of Courtney’s Seattle fans persuaded the Seattle Athletic Club to send him to the West Coast Olympic trials that May in California. During the trials on May 17 at Stanford University's track in Palo Alto, Courtney qualified for the Olympic team by winning the 100-meter dash, tying the then world Olympic record of 10.4 seconds which was set in 1908 by the South African sprinter Reggie Walker during the games in London. During the Olympic trials, Courtney also won the 200-meter dash. By qualifying, Courtney became both the University of Washington's first Olympic athlete and the first Olympic athlete from the Pacific Northwest.

== 1912 Olympic Games ==
At the Games, Courtney won both of his heats but was eliminated in the semi-finals of the 100 m and 200 m events.

Courtney was selected for the 4×100 meter relay and would almost certainly have won a gold medal in that race if the U.S. team had not been eliminated in a semi-final after two other members faulted the baton pass. It was the first and only time the United States team failed to win the 4 × 100 m relay until 1960 when they were eliminated for the same reason. Courtney also played on the U.S. team in the baseball demonstration event. Among his teammates was Abel Kiviat, the silver medalist in the 1500 metres and would become America's longest-living Olympic medal-winner. He died in 1991 at the age of 99.

== Post-Olympic career ==
In 1913, Courtney enrolled at the University of Southern California in Los Angeles, where he earned a law degree and continued running track. However, his shot at making another Olympic team in 1916 was dashed when the games were cancelled because of an event called World War I. In the 1920s, he won a number of Southern California doubles handball championships with his partner Fred Alney.

== Family ==
In 1918, Courtney married Pauline Regina Hollingsworth, whose brother Jim was the Ventura County district attorney for many years. Pauline would later become a prolific and award-winning painter, one of whose works depicting the forging area at the Fontana Kaiser Steel Mill, hung in the Library of Congress. After practicing law for a short time, Courtney became a partner in an engineering contracting business that specialized in road building. Among their many projects was the highway from Barstow to Baker. During the depression, the partnership dissolved, and Courtney again practiced law for a few more years. Then, except for two periods when he was the San Diego County Rent Attorney and worked for the State Pest Control registrar, Courtney was employed with the California Contractors' State License Board from 1940 to 1959. On May 1, 1959, Courtney returned to the practice of law when he entered into partnership with his son Norman P. Courtney in Fontana, California. In February 1968, he and Pauline celebrated their 50th wedding anniversary with a large gathering of their family and friends in the home of their daughter Shirley, whose husband, Elsworth Beam, was a superior court judge for 20 years. Also in attendance that day was their other son, Southern (named in tribute to the University of Southern California), a high school social studies teacher for many years.

== Death ==
On the morning of April 1, 1968, after he'd gone to open up the law office in downtown Fontana, Courtney thought he smelled gas and attempted to air out the building. Unfortunately, some source (most likely a spark when he flipped on a light switch) ignited the gas, and the office was rocked by a violent explosion, which blew out windows and buckled several walls. Legal papers were singed and Courtney was buffeted about the room. After emerging from the office (with his necktie still ablaze), people from an adjacent building helped snuff out his burning clothes and called paramedics. His scalp, face, neck, chest, and hands were badly burned. Courtney was taken to Fontana's Kaiser Foundation Hospital, where he died of pneumonia on April 15 due to complications and infections from his burns. Ironically, Courtney had saved a young neighbor girl from similar severe injuries at a Fourth of July party in the 1920s, when her frilly ballet dress was set on fire by another girl when she accidentally touched a lit sparkler to the flammable material in her friend’s dress during a dance presentation in his neighbor’s backyard. Hearing her screams, Courtney hurdled a hedge between the properties, chased down the panicked girl, and then wrapped her face and upper body with his coat, thereby sparing her from a lifetime of facial scars. J. Ira Courtney is buried in the Rialto Park Cemetery in Rialto, California.
