= Rolf Smedmark =

Swedish high jumper

Rolf Viktor Smedmark (January 1, 1886 – April 29, 1951) was a Swedish athlete who competed in the 1912 Summer Olympics. He was eliminated in the semifinals of the 100 metres competition. In the standing high jump event, he did not advance to the final and finished seventh. He died in his birthplace, Stockholm.
