= Clement Wilson (sprinter) =

American sprinter (1891–1983)

Clement Pierce Wilson (February 1, 1891 – April 7, 1983) was an American track and field athlete who competed in the 1912 Summer Olympics.

In 1912 he was eliminated in the semi-finals of the 100 metre competition as well as of the 200 metre event.

He was also a member of the American relay team, which was disqualified in the semi-finals of the 4x100 metre relay competition after a fault with its first baton passing.

He graduated from Coe College in Cedar Rapids, Iowa, where the "Clem Wilson Award" was presented annually to the school's outstanding track athlete for more than fifty years after his Olympic appearance.
