= Surrey Athletic Club =

British athletics club

- Founded: 1903
- Ground: Norbiton Recreation Ground
- Location: London, England

Surrey Athletic Club or Surrey AC for short, was a British athletics club based in London. The club was based at Norbiton Recreation Ground (the Kingsmeadow Athletics Stadium today).

== History ==
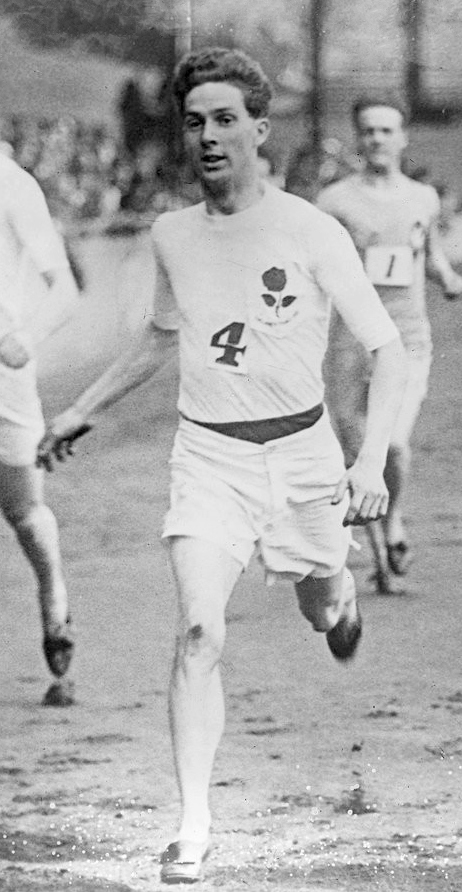
Cecil Griffiths gold medal winner at the 1920 Olympic Games

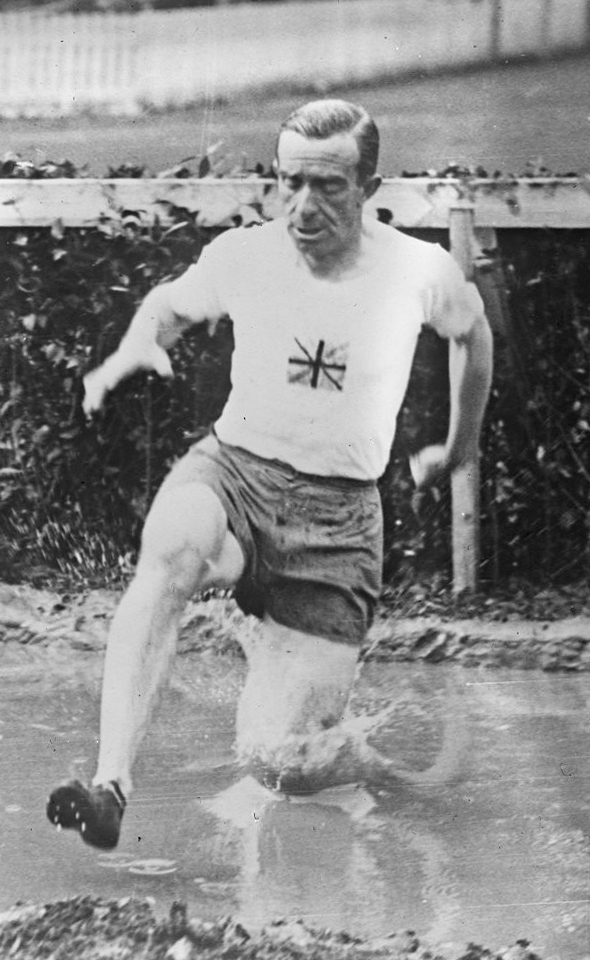
Percy Hodge secured another gold at the Olympics for Surrey AC

In 1903 the club was formed under the name Malden Harriers and the club's formation was largely attributed to Ted Vowles, a former Blackheath Harrier and Malden footballer. Mr F. B. Montague was elected president.

In 1907 the club changed its name to the Surrey Athletic Club and members of the club met at the Royal Oak in New Malden on a regular basis.

At the 1920 Summer Olympics two Surrey AC athletes, Cecil Griffiths and Percy Hodge won gold medals.

In 1969 the club joined the British Athletics League as a founder member.

In 1982, the Surrey Athletic Club disbanded and the male athletes from the club joined Belgrave Harriers, while the women decided to join Royal Borough of Kingston Athletic Club instead.

== Notable athletes ==
=== Olympic athletes ===
| Athlete | Event/s | Games | Medals/Ref |
|---|---|---|---|
| Richard Yorke | 3,200m steeplechase, 800m, 1500m | 1908, 1912 | |
| George Hutson | 5,000m, 3,000m team | 1912 | , |
| Clive Taylor | high jump (ns) | 1912 | |
| Charles Clibbon | 5,000/10,000 metres | 1920, 1924 | |
| Edgar Mountain | 800 metres | 1920, 1924 | |
| Cecil Griffiths | 4 × 400 m | 1920 | Gold medal |
| James Hatton | 10,000m, 3,000m team | 1920 | Silver medal |
| William Hill | 100, 200, 4 × 100 m | 1920 | |
| Percy Hodge | 3,000m steeplechase | 1920 | Gold medal |
| Alfred Nichols | 5,000m, cross country | 1920 | Silver medal |
| Edward Wheller | 400 metres hurdles | 1920 | |
| John Benham | cross country | 1924 | |
| Fred Blackett | 400 metres hurdles | 1924 | |
| Bill Cotterell | 10,000 metres (ns) | 1924 | |
| Eric Harrison | 110 metres hurdles | 1924 | |
| Lancelot Royle | 100 metres, 4 × 100 m | 1924 | Silver medal |
| George Constable | 10,000 metres | 1928 | |
| John Heap | 100 metres | 1928 | |
| Don Finlay | 110m hurdles, 4 × 100 m | 1932, 1936, 1948 | , |
| Frank Close | 5,000 metres | 1936 | |
| Jim Morris | 10 km walk | 1948 | |
| Maureen Barton-Chitty | long jump | 1968. 1972 | |
