= Richard Schwarz =

Russian sprinter

Richard Schwarz (January 8, 1890 – January 20, 1942) was a track and field athlete who competed for the Russian Empire in the 1912 Summer Olympics. He was born in Pavlovsk, Russian Empire. In 1912, he was eliminated in the first round of the 100 metres competition.
