= 1912 AAA Championships =

Outdoor track and field competition

- Dates: 22 June 1912
- Host city: London, England
- Venue: Stamford Bridge (stadium)
- Level: Senior
- Type: Outdoor
- Events: 16

The 1912 AAA Championships was the 1912 edition of the annual outdoor track and field competition organised by the Amateur Athletic Association (AAA). It was held on Saturday 22 June 1912 at the Stamford Bridge (stadium) in London, England. The attendance was between 12,000 and 15,000 spectators.

The Championships consisted of 16 events.

== Results ==
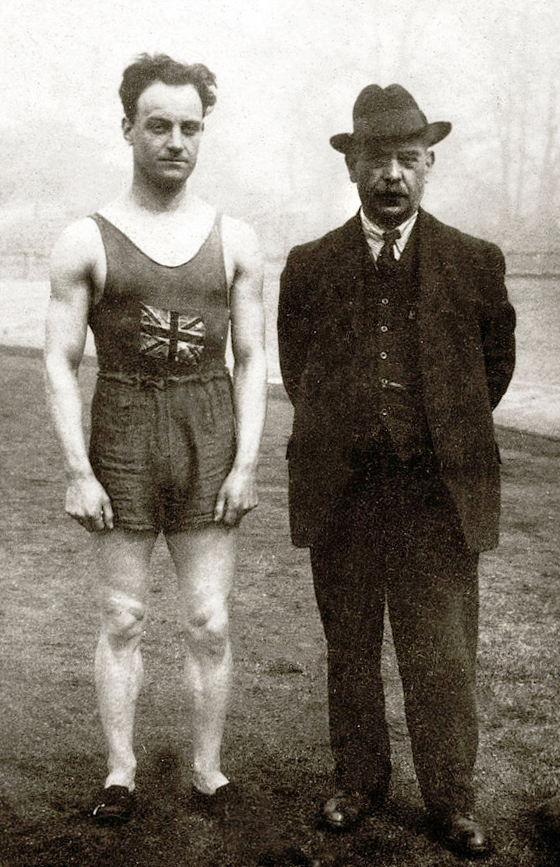
Willie Applegarth

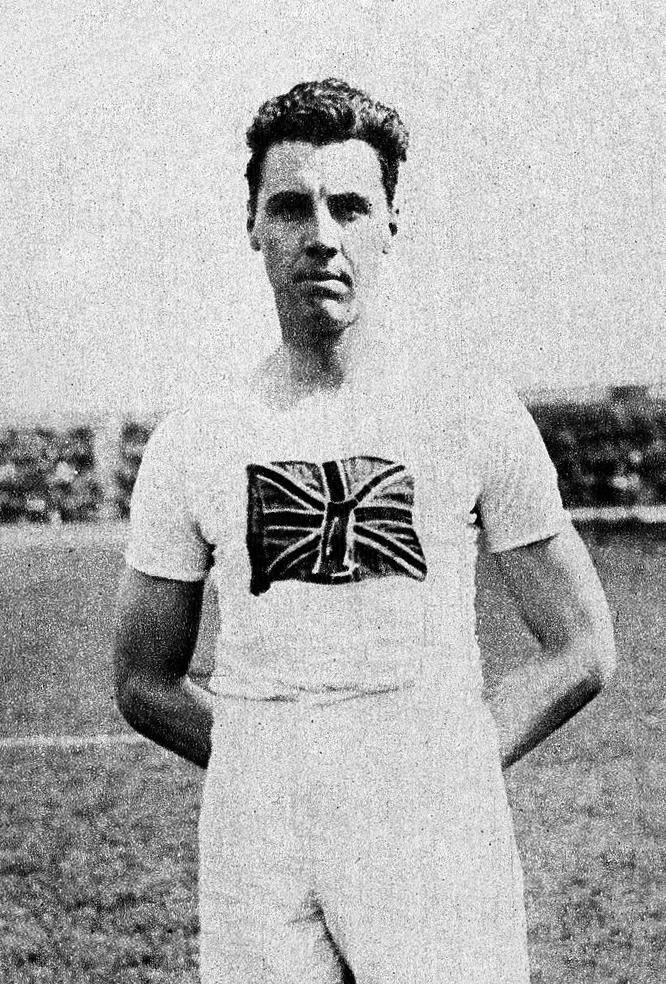
Benjamin Howard Baker

Event	Gold		Silver		Bronze	
100 yards	(South Africa) George Patching	9.8	Willie Applegarth	1½ yd	(Australia) William Stewart	½ yd
220 yards	Willie Applegarth	22.0	(Wales) David Jacobs	1¼ yd	(South Africa) George Patching	½ yd
440 yards	Cyril Seedhouse	49.8	(South Africa) George Patching	4 yd	Ernest Henley	6-7 yd
880 yards	(Germany) Hanns Braun	1:58.2	(Scotland) James Soutter	2-4 yd	Percy Mann	2 ft
1 mile	Eddie Owen	4:21.4	(Leinster) Richard Hales	3-5 yd	Joe Cottrill	3-5 yd
4 miles	George Hutson	20:10.8	William Scott	20:22.8	Amos Martin	20:53.2
10 miles	William Scott	52:35.0	Thomas Humphreys	53:55.4	W.J. Tucker	54:50.0
steeplechase	Sydney Frost	11:27.2	Jack Cruise	80-100 yd	Charles Ruffell	25-39 yd
120yd hurdles	Gerard Anderson	15.6	George Gray	2 yd	Kenneth Powell	inches
2 miles walk	Bobby Bridge	13:55.4	Ernest Webb	15-20 yd	Thomas Dumbill	30-40 yd
7 miles walk	Bobby Bridge	52:45.6	William Yates	52:59.8	Harold Ross	54:20.8
high jump	Benjamin Howard Baker	1.829	Clive Taylor	1.727	H. Ward	1.715
pole jump	Owen Conquest	2.91	not awarded		only 1 competitor	
long jump	(Leinster) Percy Kirwan	7.07	Philip Kingsford	6.86	Henry Ashington	6.78
shot put	(Leinster) Denis Horgan	13.66	(United States) Wesley Coe	3.35	(Scotland) Tom Nicolson	12.53
hammer throw	(Scotland) Tom Nicolson	49.43	(Leinster) Denis Carey	47.87	(United States) Benjamin Sherman	41.36
