= Erwin Kern =

German athlete

Erwin Kern (23 August 1888 – 20 March 1963) was a German track and field athlete who competed in the 1912 Summer Olympics. He was born in Pfirt and died in Schönau im Schwarzwald.

In 1912, he was eliminated in the semi-finals of the 100 metres competition. He was also a member of the German relay team, which was disqualified in the final of the 4x100 metre relay competition after a fault with its second baton passing.
