= David Jacobs (Welsh athlete) =

British athlete (1888–1976)

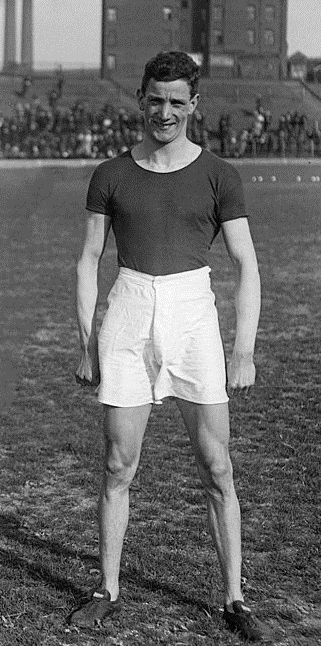
- David Jacobs in 1913

Personal information
- Born: 30 April 1888 Cardiff, Wales
- Died: 6 June 1976 (aged 88) Llandudno, Conwy, Wales
- Height: 1.75 m (5 ft 9 in)
- Weight: 70 kg (154 lb)

Sport
- Sport: Athletics
- Event: 100–400 m
- Club: Herne Hill Harriers, Mitcham

Achievements and titles
- Personal bests: 100 m – 10.8 (1912); 200 m – 21.9e (1912); 440 yd – 49.9e (1913)
Medal record
Representing Great Britain
Olympic Games
Gold medal – first place	1912 Stockholm	4 × 100 m relay

David Henry Jacobs (30 April 1888 – 6 June 1976) was a Welsh-born track and field sprinter. He was the first British Jew to win an Olympic gold medal.

== Biography ==
Jacobs was born in Cardiff to John Jacobs (previously Yaakov), who was a general dealer from London. His athletics career started in London with Herne Hill Harriers in 1908. His interest in athletics was aroused by watching the 1908 Olympic Games.

At the 1912 Summer Olympics in Stockholm, Jacobs won a gold medal as the first leg in the British 4 × 100 m relay team, despite finishing second behind the United States in the semifinals. The United States was later disqualified for a fault in passing the baton, the same mistake made in the finals by the world record holder and main favourite German team.

Jacobs competed in the 100 m and 200 m individual events but was eliminated in the semifinals.

Although many times a Welsh champion, Jacobs never succeeded in winning an AAA title. He finished third in the 440 yards event at the 1910 AAA Championships, second behind Willie Applegarth at the 1912 AAA Championships and second again behind George Nicol at the 1913 AAA Championships.

Jacobs retired from active sport after World War I. He died suddenly in Aberconwy, aged 88, while on holiday from his London home. His body was returned to London, where he was buried in a Jewish cemetery, at East Ham. At the time of his death, he was Britain's oldest Olympic gold medalist.

== See also ==
- List of British Jewish sportspeople
- Harold Abrahams, British Jewish sprint champion in the 1924 Olympics
- Chariots of Fire, award-winning 1981 film depicting Abrahams' story
