= Robert Bridge =

British racewalker

Personal information
- Nationality: British (English)
- Born: 16 April 1883 Chester-le-Street, England
- Died: 17 July 1953 (aged 70) Liverpool, England

Sport
- Sport: Athletics
- Event: Racewalking
- Club: Lancashire Walking Club

Achievements and titles
- Personal bests: 2 mile walk: 13:48.8 (1912) 7 mile walk: 52:06.8 (1914) 2 hr walk: 24.781 km (1914)

Robert Bridge (16 April 1883 – 17 July 1953) was a British racewalker who competed at the 1912 Summer Olympics.

== Career ==
Bridge became the National 2 miles walk champion and the National 7 miles walk champion after winning both AAA Championships titles at the 1912 AAA Championships.

Shortly after the 1912 AAA Championships, he competed in the 10 km walk at the 1912 Summer Olympics in Stockholm, Sweden.

Bridge retained his 2 miles and 7 miles walk titles at the 1913 AAA Championships and the 1914 AAA Championships. After World War I, Bridge successfully returned to action to win the 2 miles walk at the 1919 AAA Championships and finished third behind Ugo Frigerio in the 2 miles walk event at the 1922 AAA Championships.
