= André Campana =

French long jumper

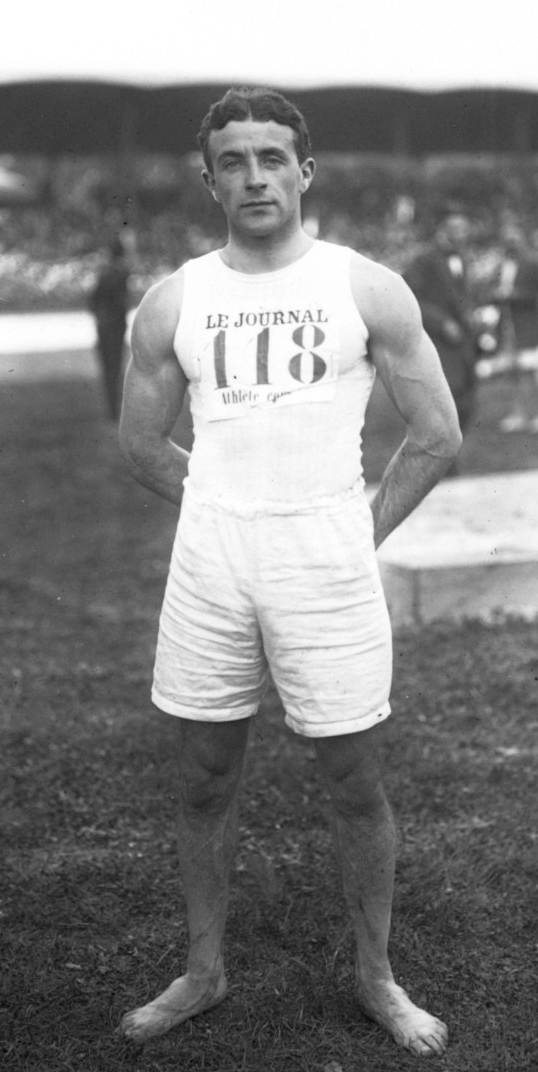
- André Campana in 1913

Personal information
- Born: 21 May 1886 Paris, France
- Died: 12 November 1931 (aged 45) Paris, France

Sport
- Sport: Athletics
- Event(s): Long jump, high jump, sprint, hurdles
- Club: Stade Bordelais, Bordeaux

Achievements and titles
- Personal best(s): LJ – 7.015 m (1913); HJ – 1.75 m (1906); 100 m – 10.9 (1905); 400 mH – 67.8 (1903)

François Laurent Joseph André Campana (21 May 1886 – 12 November 1931) was a French athlete who competed in the long jump at the 1912 Summer Olympics.

== Career ==
Campana was selected to represent France at the 1912 Olympics in Stockholm, Sweden. He finished 16th in the long jump.

The following year, he finished third behind Sidney Abrahams in the long jump event at the British 1913 AAA Championships.
