= John Heap (athlete) =

English sprinter

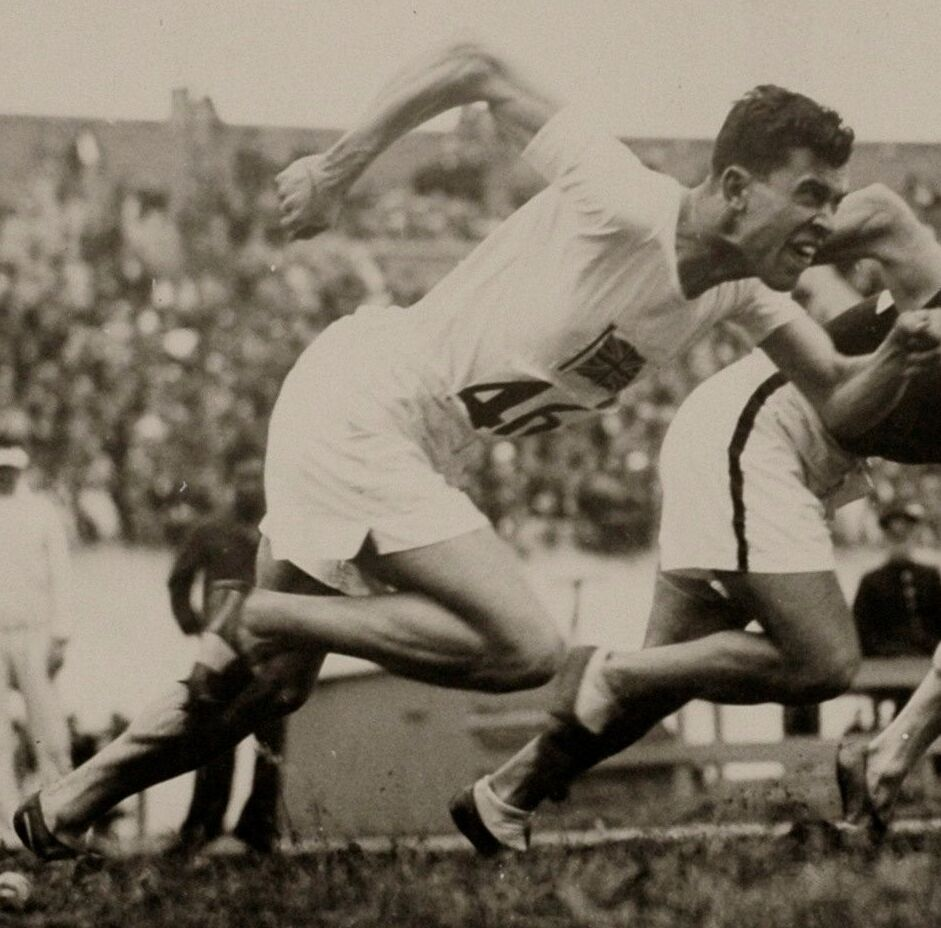

Personal information
- Nationality: British (English)
- Born: 9 November 1907 St Pancras, London, England
- Died: 6 April 2000 (aged 92) Dacorum, England

Sport
- Sport: Athletics
- Event: Sprints
- Club: Surrey AC
Medal record
Men's athletics
Representing England
British Empire Games
Silver medal – second place	1930 Hamilton	4×110 yards

John Crocker Heap (9 November 1907 – 6 April 2000) was an athlete who competed for Great Britain in the 1928 Summer Olympics.

== Biography ==
Heap was born in St Pancras, London and was a member of the Surrey Athletic Club.

In 1928 he was eliminated in the first round of the Olympic 100 metre event at the 1928 Olympic Games in Amsterdam.

He represented England at the 1930 British Empire Games in Hamilton, Ontario, where he won the silver medal with the relay team in the 4×110 yards competition.
