= E. A. Southee =

Australian educator

Ethelbert Southee
Personal information
- Born: 6 August 1890 Cootamundra, New South Wales, Australia
- Died: 27 December 1968 (aged 78)

Sport
- Sport: Athletics
- Event: long jump

Ethelbert Ambrook Southee (6 August 1890 – 27 December 1968), invariably referred to as E. A. Southee or Bert Southee, was an Australian educator.

== Biography ==
Southee was born in Cootamundra, New South Wales to Frederick Southee, a baker, and his wife Catherine Charlotte Southee, née McCutcheon; his older siblings were Fred, Ernest and Arthur and Alice. He was educated at Cootamundra Superior Public School, Sydney Boys' High School and the University of Sydney, graduating B.Sc. in 1912. A "brilliant academic and sportsman" (he was NSW long-jump champion) Southee won a Rhodes scholarship in 1913 and proceeded to St John's College, Oxford.

His academic career was "put on hold" by the outbreak of the First World War: he enlisted immediately and received a commission in the British Army, serving on the Western Front and in Italy, rising to the rank of Acting Major and was appointed O.B.E. in 1919. He resumed his studies in 1919 and was elected a representative for the Oxford University Athletic Club. He finished third behind William Petersson in the long jump event at the 1919 AAA Championships.

He graduated BSc.Agr in 1919 and was elected a fellow of the Linnean Society of London.

Southee and his wife Charlotte moved to Cornell University, Ithaca, New York State, to undertake research and further studies, but she suffered a miscarriage, losing twin sons. He cut their stay short to accept the post of principal of the Hawkesbury Agricultural College, Richmond, New South Wales, serving from 1921 to 1954 as "one of Australia's foremost agricultural educators".

== Other interests ==
Southee was a longtime member of the NSW Royal Agricultural Society and a vice-president of the Society 1939–1968.

== Personal ==
On 23 June 1918 in Sydney Southee married Charlotte Elizabeth "Lottie" Lappin (died 10 July 1944). Their children included:

- Joyce Elizabeth Southee (15 November 1921 – 28 June 2021), married Gordon Marshman on 29 January 1949
- Colin Ethelbert Southee (9 March 1928 – 7 November 2015)

== Recognition ==
- Southee horticultural pavilion at the former Sydney Showground was named for him, as was
- E. A. Southee Primary School in Cootamundra.
- Southee Rd, Richmond, running along the southern edge of town from the gates of the old Hawkesbury Agricultural College (now Western Sydney University), to Castlereagh Rd, is named in his honour.
