= Frank Belote =

US sprinter and high jumper (1883–1928)

Frank Vern Belote (October 8, 1883 – October 12, 1928) was an American track and field athlete who competed in the 1912 Summer Olympics. He was born in Burr Oak, Michigan.

In 1912, he finished fifth in the 100 metres event and seventh in the standing high jump competition. He was also a member of the American relay team, which was disqualified in the semi-finals of the 4x100 metre relay event after a baton-passing fault on the first transfer.

He died in October 1928 in Detroit, Michigan.
