= Alvah Meyer =

American athletics competitor

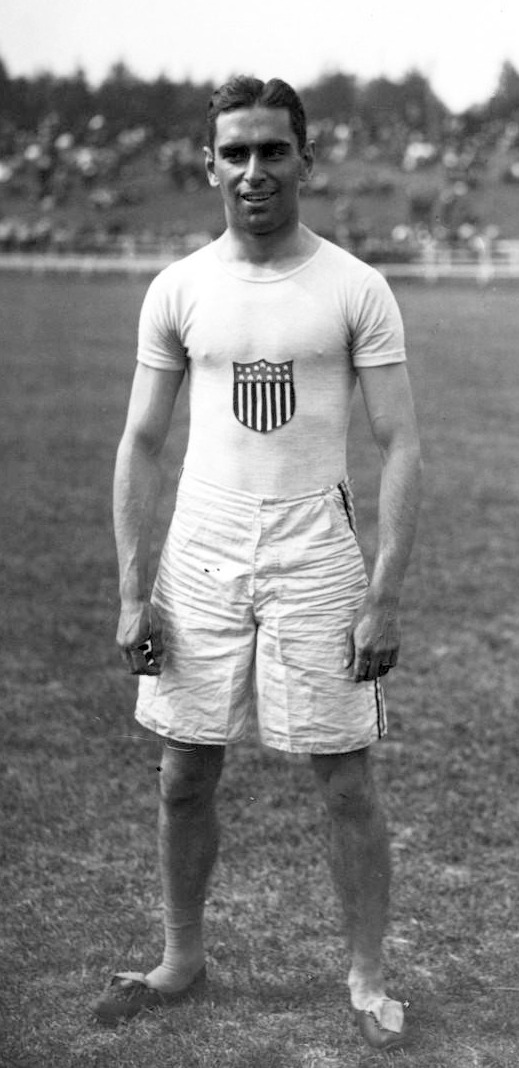
- Alvah Meyer in 1912

Personal information
- Born: July 18, 1888 New York City, United States
- Died: December 19, 1939 (aged 51) Tucson, Arizona, United States
- Height: 1.73 m (5 ft 8 in)
- Weight: 65 kg (143 lb)

Sport
- Sport: Track sprinter
- Events: 100m, 200m
- Club: I-AAC, Queens

Achievements and titles
- Personal bests: 100m – 10.7 seconds (1912); 200 – 21.7 seconds (1912)
Medal record
Representing the United States
Olympic Games
Silver medal – second place	1912 Stockholm	100 metres

Alvah T. Meyer (July 18, 1888 – December 19, 1939) was an American sprint runner. He was a Jewish member of the Irish American Athletic Club, which also included Abel Kiviat and Myer Prinstein.

He was born in New York City on July 18, 1888. Showing great promise prior to the 1912 Olympics, he won the AAU indoor 60y in 1911 and the 220 y outdoor in 1912.

== Olympic silver medalist ==
Meyer underperformed at the 1912 Olympic Trials and was only selected for the US Olympic team on the condition he pay for his travel, which his parents eventually covered. He won the silver medal in the 100 meters, but though he was the reigning American champion at the time, he was eliminated in the semi-finals of the 200 m event.

In 1914, he set a world indoor record at 60 yards; in 1915, he set a world record at 330 yards.

== See also ==
- List of select Jewish track and field athletes
