= Clas Gille =

Swedish pole vaulter

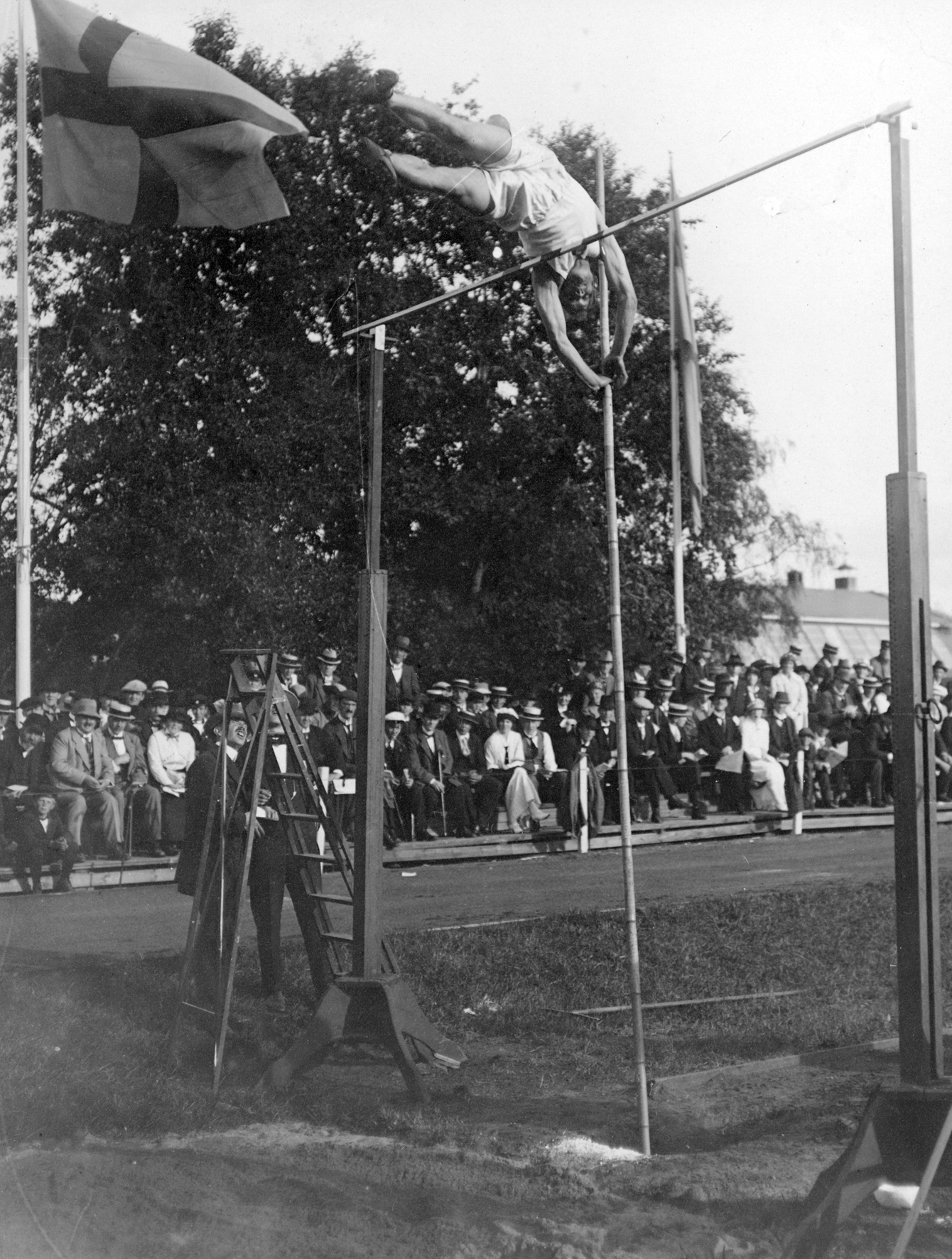

Personal information
- Born: 1 May 1888 Luleå, Sweden
- Died: 26 August 1952 (aged 64) Askim, Sweden
- Height: 1.71 m (5 ft 7 in)
- Weight: 72 kg (159 lb)

Sport
- Sport: Athletics
- Event: Pole vault
- Club: Gefle IF

Achievements and titles
- Personal best: 3.86 m (1916)

Clas Thorulf Gille (1 May 1888 – 26 August 1952) was a Swedish pole vaulter who competed at the 1912 Summer Olympics.

== Career ==
Gille was selected to represent Sweden in his home Olympics in 1912 in Stockholm. He competed in the pole jump event (as it was known as at the time) and finished in 12th place.

The following year, he won the British AAA Championships pole jump title at the British 1913 AAA Championships.

Gille was a top European pole vaulter of the 1910s. He won the Baltic Games in 1914, the Swedish Games in 1916 and four national titles in 1910, 1913–14 and 1916. Besides pole vaulting, he competed nationally in the high jump, long jump, and alpine ski jumping. After retiring from competitions, he worked as an athletics coach from 1918 to 1927 and as an athletic grounds supervisor. He died after being hit by a motorcycle.
