= Ralph Craig =

American athlete (1889–1972)

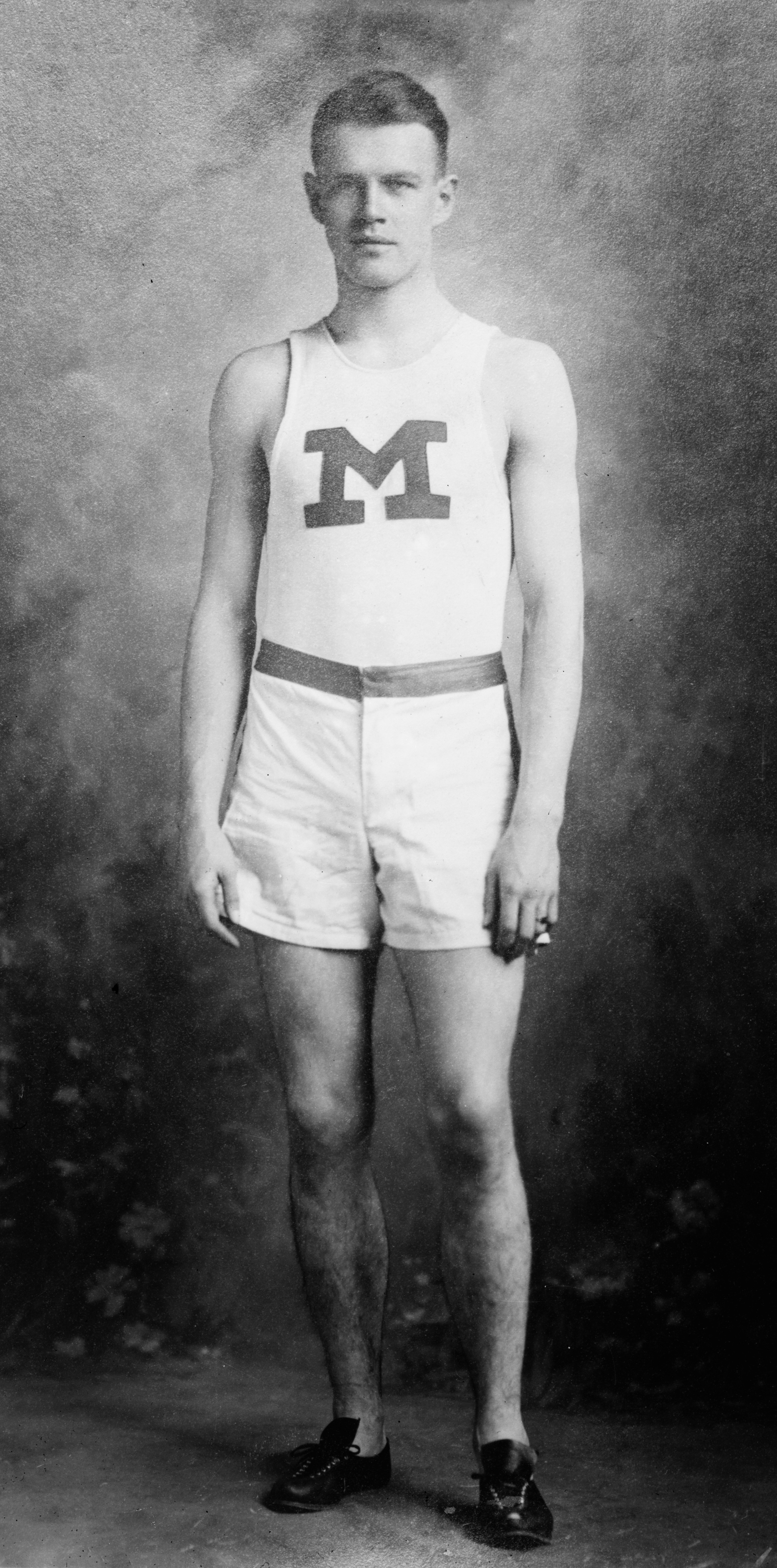
- Ralph Craig c. 1912

Personal information
- Born: June 21, 1889 Detroit, Michigan, United States
- Died: July 21, 1972 (aged 83) Lake George, New York, United States
- Height: 1.82 m (6 ft 0 in)
- Weight: 73 kg (161 lb)

Sport
- Sport: Sprint running
- Club: Detroit Athletic Club
Medal record
Representing the United States
Olympic Games
Gold medal – first place	1912 Stockholm	100 metres
Gold medal – first place	1912 Stockholm	200 metres

Ralph Cook Craig (June 21, 1889 – July 21, 1972) was an American track and field athlete. He was the winner of the sprint double at the 1912 Summer Olympics.

Craig began his track career as a hurdler at Detroit Central High School and only later developed into a sprinter at the University of Michigan. In 1910, he won the IC4A 220 y championship, repeating this the following year.

In 1912, Craig qualified for the Olympic team and went to Sweden, where he reached the final of the 100 m. A big favorite was his compatriot Donald Lippincott, who had set a world record of 10.6 in the heats. After no less than seven false starts, Craig won the race in 10.8 – Lippincott only finished third. Craig fought another battle with Lippincott in the 200 m, edging him to win the 200 m title. Craig was not a part of the American 4 × 100 m relay team, which was disqualified.

Immediately after the Olympics, Craig retired from the sport. His younger brother, James B. Craig, also ran track at Michigan and starred for the Michigan Wolverines football team, earning a consensus selection to the 1913 College Football All-America Team.

In 1948, Craig returned to the Olympics as an alternate on the US yachting team. Although he did not compete, Craig (59) carried the American flag at the opening ceremonies in London.

Craig was employed for many years as an administrator with the New York State Unemployment Bureau. He died at Lake George, New York.

In 2010, he was inducted into the National Track and Field Hall of Fame.

== Competitions ==
- In March 1911, Craig set a new record by running the 40-yard high hurdles in 5.2 seconds, breaking the prior record held by Forrest Smithson.
- In May 1911, at his last competition wearing the Michigan uniform, Craig helped the Wolverines to a third-place finish in the inter-collegiate meet. He tied the inter-collegiate record in the 100-yard dash with a time of 9.8 seconds. He also tied the world record in the 220-yard dash with a time of 21.2 seconds. The Wolverines finished the meet with 24 points, trailing only Cornell (30 points) and Yale (24-1/2 points).

Olympic Games
Preceded by John Heaton	Flagbearer for United States; London 1948	Succeeded by James Bickford
