= Richard Rau =

German sprinter (1889–1945)

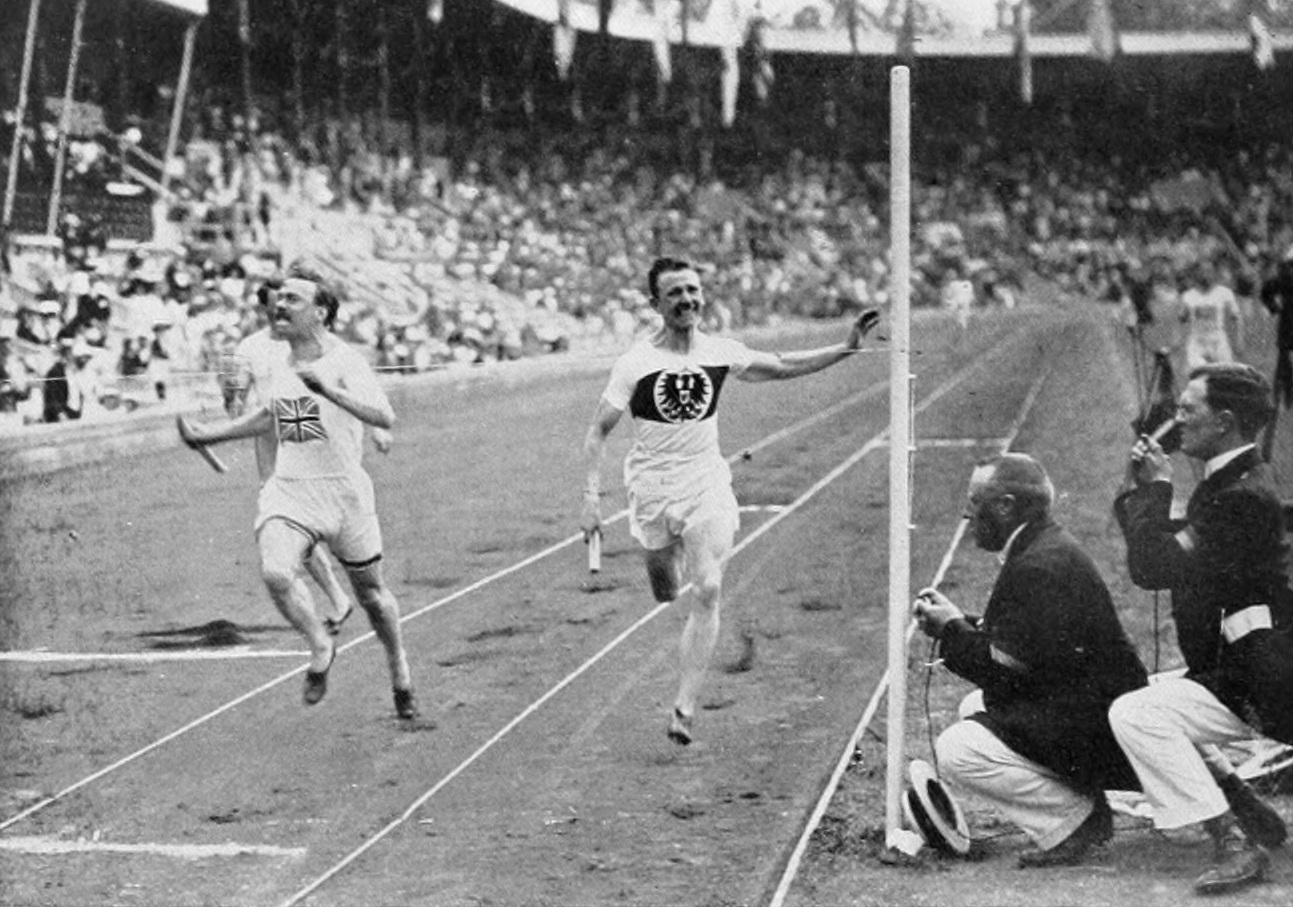
- Richard Rau (right) in the 4×100 m final at the 1912 Olympics

Personal information
- Born: 26 August 1889 Berlin, German Empire
- Died: 6 November 1945 (aged 56) Vyazma, Russian SFSR, Soviet Union
- Height: 1.78 m (5 ft 10 in)
- Weight: 67 kg (148 lb)

Sport
- Sport: Sprint running
- Club: SC Charlottenburg, Berlin

Richard Rau (26 August 1889 – 6 November 1945) was a German SS officer and track and field athlete who competed in the 1912 Summer Olympics.

== Biography ==
Rau started competing in flat sprint and hurdles in 1908, winning several national championships and setting 20 national records over his career, often under the pseudonym Richard Einsporn. Additionally, Rau finished third in the 220 yards event at the 1911 AAA Championships.

At the 1912 Olympic Games, Rau was eliminated in the semi-finals of the 100 m and finished fourth in the 200 m competition. He was also a member of the German relay team, which was disqualified in the final of the 4 × 100 m relay after a fault with its second baton passing.

The following year in 1913, Rau finished third behind Willie Applegarth in the 220 yards event at the British 1913 AAA Championships.

After retirement, he ran a sports shop and, in 1933, joined the Nazi Party, reaching the rank of SS-Sturmbannführer in 1938. During World War II, Wau served in the Waffen-SS. In 1945, he was captured by the American forces and handed over to the Soviet Union. He was shot during a failed escape attempt and moved to a prisoner camp in Vyasma, where he died in a few months.
