= Percy Mann =

British athlete

Personal information
- Born: 12 May 1888 Eltham, London
- Died: 23 September 1974 (aged 86) Warrington, England

Sport
- Sport: Athletics
- Event: 880y/880m
- Club: Polytechnic Harriers

Percy Edward Mann (12 May 1888 – 23 September 1974) was a British track and field athlete who competed in the 1912 Summer Olympics.

== Career ==
Mann, born in Eltham, finished third behind German Hanns Braun in the 880 yards event at the 1912 AAA Championships.

Shortly after the AAA Championships, Mann competed for Great Britain at the 1912 Summer Olympics held in Stockholm, Sweden. He was eliminated in the semi-finals of the 800 metres competition. He died in Warrington.
