= George Patching =

South African sprinter (1886–1944)

Personal information
- Nationality: South African
- Born: 15 September 1886 Queenstown, Cape Colony, South Africa
- Died: 31 March 1944 (aged 57) Pretoria, Gauteng, South Africa

Sport
- Sport: Sprinting
- Event: 100 metres

George Herbert Patching (15 September 1886 – 31 March 1944) was a South African sprinter who finished 4th in the 100 metres at the 1912 Summer Olympics.

== Career ==
Patching won the British AAA Championships title in the 100 yards event at the 1912 AAA Championships. The time recorded in the final was 9.8 seconds and was described as the outstanding feature of the day.

In addition to winning the 100 yards title he finished third behind Willie Applegarth in the 220 yards event and finished runner-up behind Cyril Seedhouse in the 440 yards, at the same championships.

Later that year, at the 1912 Olympic Games in Stockholm, Sweden, Patching competed in the men's 100 metres event, where he just missed out on a medal after finishing fourth in the final. Patching also competed in the 200 metres, where he won his quarter final race and the 400 metres, winning his heat before being eliminated in the semi-finals.
