= Joseph Aelter =

Belgian sprinter

Léon Joseph Aelter (born 6 January 1890) was a sprinter from Belgium.

Aelter competed for his home nation at the 1912 Summer Olympics in Stockholm, Sweden. He finished third in his heat in the 200 metres, failing to qualify for the following round. He finished second in his heat in the 100 metres qualifying, qualifying for the semi-final, which he was unable to finish.
