= Jón Halldórsson (athlete, born 1889) =

Icelandic sprinter

Jón Halldórsson (November 2, 1889 – July 7, 1984) was an athlete from Iceland who competed in the 1912 Summer Olympics.
