= Gerard Anderson =

English athlete

Personal information
- Born: 15 March 1889 Twickenham, London, England
- Died: 7, 9 or 11 November 1914 (aged 25) Ieper (Ypres), West-Vlaanderen, Belgium

Sport
- Sport: Athletics
- Event: 120y/440y hurdles
- Club: Oxford University AC

Gerard Rupert Laurie Anderson (15 March 1889 – November 1914), universally known as "Twiggy", was a British hurdler who participated in the 1912 Stockholm Olympics and held the world record for the 440-yards hurdles.

== Biography ==
Twiggy Anderson was born in Twickenham, then a village and parish in Brentford district, Middlesex county in Greater London, England. His parents were the Rev David Anderson, an Anglican prebendary, and Blanche Alice May Anderson (née Laurie). He had two sisters, Gladys and Mona Constance Amabel, and a brother, Arthur Emilius David. He attended Ludgrove School, Eton and Trinity College, Oxford. On graduating he was elected to a Fellowship of All Souls College.

He was the AAA champion at the 120-yards hurdles at the 1910 AAA Championships. and the 1912 AAA Championships. On 16 July 1910 at the Crystal Palace, Anderson set the IAAF world record in the 440-yards hurdles with a time of 56.8 seconds. Anderson took part in the Stockholm Olympics in 1912. He was favoured to win a medal but had an accident during the Men's 110 metres and was disqualified. Anderson's brother Arthur was also a noted track star, competing in the 100 metres competition and the 200 metres event. After graduating university, Anderson became a manager at the Cammell Laird shipyard in Birkenhead.

During the First World War, Anderson joined the British Army. He gained a commission as a Second Lieutenant. On 16 October 1914, he joined the 3rd Battalion, attached to the 1st Battalion of the Cheshire Regiment. He saw action with this unit in France and Belgium On 7 November, Anderson was shot and mortally wounded in the heart, aged 25, at Hooge, near Ypres. Also killed were Captain George Bertram Pollock-Hodsoll, a footballer who had played for Casuals and Corinthians (who had, on occasion, captained the Army team), and four enlisted men. Anderson's unit successfully repelled a German attack and captured twenty-five enemy troops. There are differing accounts of Anderson's death from his wounds. Battalion records state he was killed on 7 November, the day he was wounded. A sports biography places his death on 9 November and records from the Commonwealth War Graves Commission place his death on 11 November.

== See also ==
- List of Olympians killed in World War I
