= Benjamin Howard Baker =

English footballer and athlete

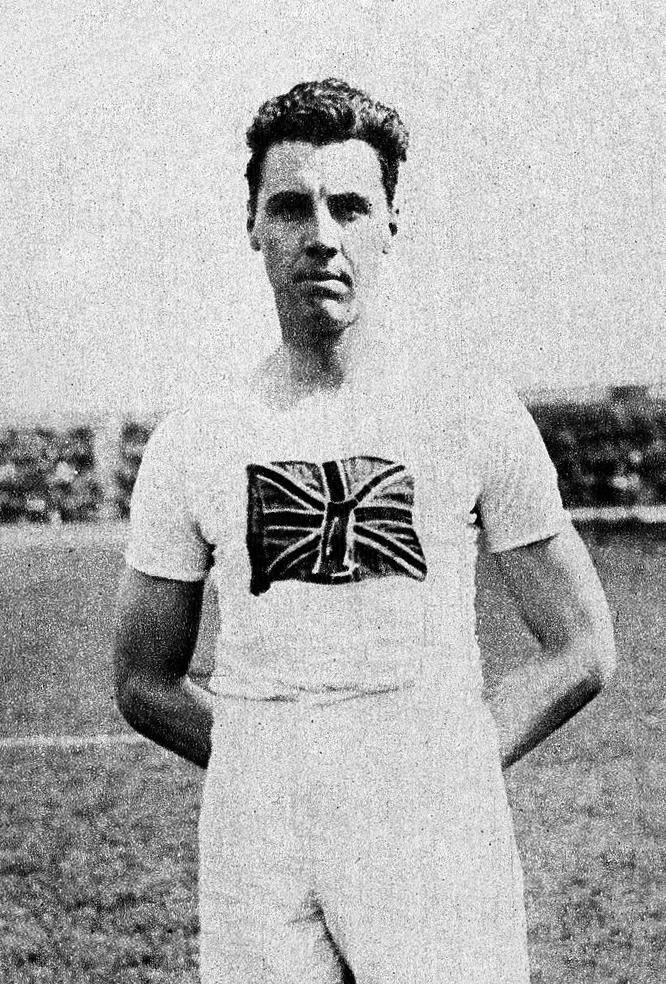
- Benjamin Howard Baker at the 1920 Olympics

Personal information
- Full name: Benjamin Howard Baker
- Date of birth: 13 February 1892
- Place of birth: Liverpool, England
- Date of death: 10 September 1987 (aged 95)
- Place of death: Warminster, England
- Height: 6 ft 2 in (1.88 m)
- Position: Goalkeeper

Youth career
- Marlborough Old Boys (Liverpool)
- Liverpool Balmoral

Senior career*
Years	Team	Apps	(Gls)
1913–1914	Blackburn Rovers	0	(0)
1914–1915	Preston North End	0	(0)
1919–1920	Liverpool	0	(0)
1919–1933	Corinthian	?	(?)
1921	Everton	2	(0)
1921–1926	Chelsea	92	(1)
1926	Everton	11	(0)
1928–1929	Oldham Athletic	1	(0)
Total		106	(1)

International career
1921–1925	England	2	(0)
- * Club domestic league appearances and goals

Benjamin Howard Baker (13 February 1892 – 10 September 1987) was an English athlete who excelled in a wide range of sports, mostly in association football and high jump.

== Biography ==
In team sports, Baker was goalkeeper for England, Chelsea, Everton and Oldham Athletic football clubs, having previously played for the renowned amateur team, the Corinthians. He played for the "Amateurs" in the 1925 FA Charity Shield. He was also an international-level water polo goalkeeper. Baker initially played as a defender and took the keeper position after his ankle was damaged in a naval mine sweeping operation during World War I.

In tennis singles, doubles and mixed doubles, Baker competed in the 1929 Northern Qualifying Tournament for Wimbledon without making the main draw in any event and won the 1932 Welsh Covered Courts tennis competition.

Individually, Baker held British records in the high jump (1.95 m, from 1921 to 1946) and triple jump. Baker became the National high jump champion for the first time after winning the AAA Championships title at the 1910 AAA Championships. He would go on to be the British champion from 1910 through to 1921, by virtue of either winning the AAA title or being the best placed British athlete in the event. His outright successes came in 1910, 1912, 1913, 1919, 1920 and 1921.

Baker competed in jump events at the 1912 and 1920 Olympic Games and finished in 6–11th places. At the Northern Counties Championships he won the high jump (1911–14, 1919–21), 120 yd hurdles (1921) and discus throw (1920); he also won the long jump at the 1920 Northern Olympic Trials. After retiring from sports, Baker joined the family firm that produces soap and chemicals and became a renowned businessman in the Liverpool area.

Although Baker was sometimes known as Benjamin Howard-Baker (such as in 'Play Up Corinth - A history of the Corinthian Football Club') his baptism record at St Margaret, Anfield on 28 March 1892 shows his Christian names as 'Benjamin Howard', and his surname as 'Baker'. His father had the same name.
