= Charles Ruffell =

British runner

Personal information
- Born: 16 September 1888 London, England
- Died: 9 November 1923 (aged 35) Regent's Park, London, England

Sport
- Sport: Athletics
- Event: middle-distance
- Club: Highgate Harriers

Charles Henry Ruffell (16 September 1888 – 9 November 1923) was a British track and field athlete who competed in the 1912 Summer Olympics.

== Career ==
Ruffell finished third behind Sydney Frost in the 2 miles steeplechase event at the 1912 AAA Championships.

Shortly after the AAA Championships, he competed in the 1912 Olympic Games, in Stockholm, Sweden, where he was eliminated in the first round of the 1500 metres competition, as well as in the first rounds of the 5000 metres competition and 10000 metres competition.

In 1913, he became the National steeplechase champion, and in 1914, he won the English National Cross Country Championships, which was held at Chesham.

During World War I, he served in Palestine as a sapper with the Royal Engineers. He died at the age of 35 from acute pneumonia following a bout of influenza.
