= Victor d'Arcy =

British sprinter (1887–1961)

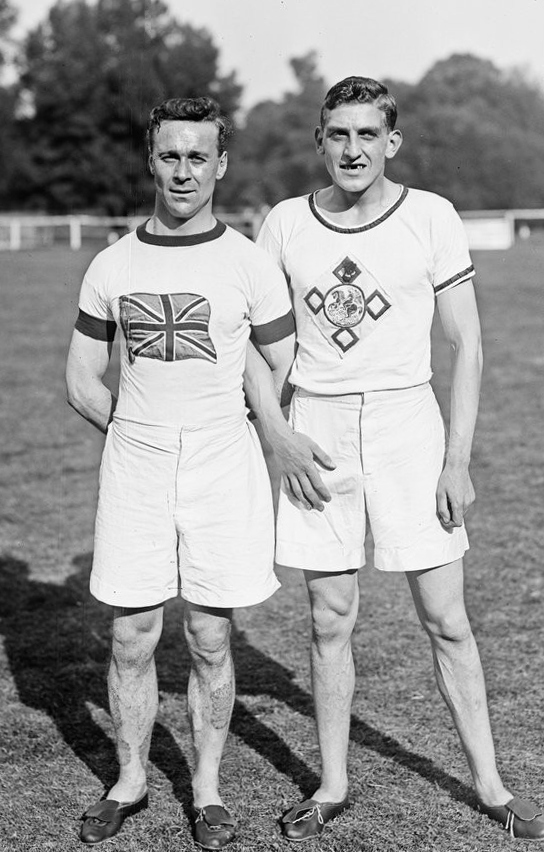
- Vic d'Arcy (left) and Harold Abrahams in 1920

Personal information
- Born: 30 June 1887 Rotherhithe, London, Great Britain
- Died: 12 March 1961 (aged 73) Fish Hoek, Cape Town, South Africa
- Height: 1.72 m (5 ft 8 in)
- Weight: 63 kg (139 lb)

Sport
- Sport: Athletics
- Events: 100 m, 200 m
- Club: Polytechnic Harriers, London

Achievements and titles
- Personal bests: 100 yd – 9.8 (1911); 100 m – 10.9 (1911); 200 m – 21.6 (1914)
Medal record
Representing Great Britain
Olympic Games
Gold medal – first place	1912 Stockholm	4 × 100 m relay

Victor Henry Augustus d'Arcy (30 June 1887 – 12 March 1961) was a British sprint runner who competed at the 1912 and 1920 Summer Olympics.

== Biography ==
D'Arcy finished second behind Frederick Ramsdell in the 100 yards event at the 1911 AAA Championships.

At the 1912 Olympic Games, d'Arcy was eliminated in the semifinals of both 100 m and 200 m events. As a third leg in the British 4 × 100 m relay team, he won a gold medal despite finishing second behind the United States in the semifinal. United States was later disqualified for a fault in passing the baton. The same mistake was made in the final by world record holder and main favourite German team.

The following year, D'Arcy finished second behind Willie Applegarth in the 220 yards event at the 1913 AAA Championships and this was repeated at the 1914 AAA Championships. After the war, d'Arcy continued to race and finished second behind William Hill in the 100 yards event at the 1919 AAA Championships.

At the 1920 Summer Olympics, d'Arcy again reached the semifinals of the 100 m and also ran in the heats of the 200 m. He ran again in the third leg in the British 4 × 100 m relay team, which finished fourth. After the Games, he moved to Rhodesia, where he lived until he died in 1961.
