= Willie Applegarth =

English sprinter (1890–1958)

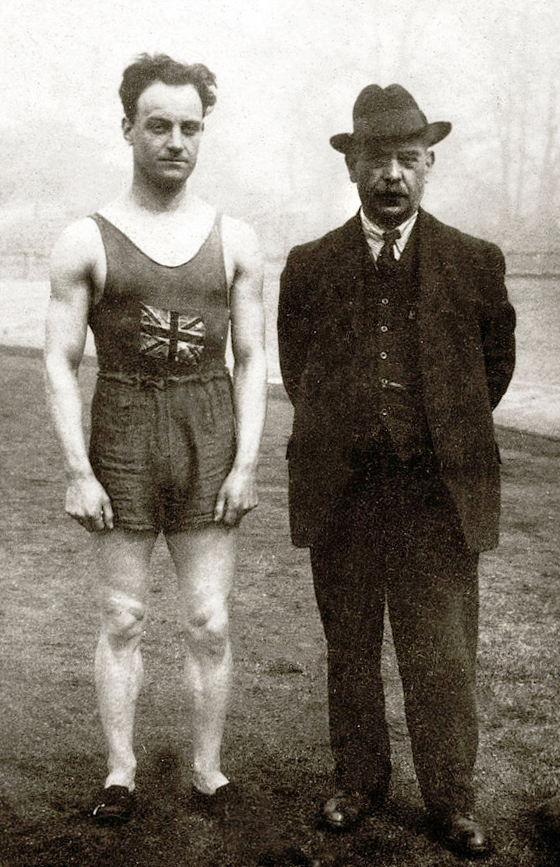
- Applegarth with coach Sam Mussabini at the 1912 Olympics

Personal information
- Nationality: British
- Born: 11 May 1890 Guisborough, North Riding of Yorkshire, England
- Died: 5 December 1958 (aged 68) Schenectady, New York, United States
- Height: 1.70 m (5 ft 7 in)
- Weight: 59 kg (130 lb)

Sport
- Sport: Athletics
- Events: 100 m, 200 m
- Club: Polytechnic Harriers
- Coached by: Sam Mussabini

Achievements and titles
- Personal bests: 100 m – 10.6 (1912); 200 m – 21.1 (1914)
Medal record
Representing Great Britain
Olympic Games
Gold medal – first place	1912 Stockholm	4 × 100 m relay
Bronze medal – third place	1912 Stockholm	200 metres

William Reuben Applegarth (11 May 1890 – 5 December 1958) was a British track and field athlete and winner of a gold medal in the 4 × 100 metres relay at the 1912 Summer Olympics.

== Biography ==
Born in Guisborough, then in the North Riding of Yorkshire, William Applegarth was one of the best European sprinters during World War I.

At the Stockholm Olympics, Applegarth was eliminated in the semifinals of the 100 m competition and won a bronze medal in the 200 m. As the anchoring leg in the British 4 × 100 m relay team, he won a gold medal despite finishing second after the US in the semifinal. The United States was later disqualified for a fault in passing the baton; the same mistake was made in the final by the world record holder and main favourite German team.

Applegarth was a British National AAA champion in 100 yd (91 m) at the 1913 AAA Championships and 1914 AAA Championships and was the highest British athlete at the 1912 AAA Championships, finishing behind South African George Patching. Additionally, he was the 220 yards champion from 1912 to 1914.

Shortly after the Olympics, Applegarth repeated Donald Lippincott's world record in the 100 m of 10.6 and set a new world record of 21.2 in the 200 m in the 1914 AAA meeting. His 200 m record was not broken until 1928.

In November 1914, Applegarth turned professional and, in 1922, emigrated to America, where he became the track and association football coach at Mercersburg Academy in Pennsylvania. He also played for Brooklyn in the American Soccer League. In 1925, he retired from sport and began working as a welder at the General Electric Company, where he stayed until 1955. He died aged 68, in the same year his British 100 yd (91 m) record of 9.8 s was finally broken.
