= Great Britain at the 1906 Intercalated Games =

- Flag of the United Kingdom
- IOC code: GBR
- NOC: British Olympic Association

in Athens
- Competitors: 47 in 9 sports
- Medals Ranked 4th: Gold 8 Silver 11 Bronze 5 Total 24

Summer appearances
- 1896; 1900; 1904; 1908; 1912; 1920; 1924; 1928; 1932; 1936; 1948; 1952; 1956; 1960; 1964; 1968; 1972; 1976; 1980; 1984; 1988; 1992; 1996; 2000; 2004; 2008; 2012; 2016; 2020; 2024

Winter appearances
- 1924; 1928; 1932; 1936; 1948; 1952; 1956; 1960; 1964; 1968; 1972; 1976; 1980; 1984; 1988; 1992; 1994; 1998; 2002; 2006; 2010; 2014; 2018; 2022; 2026

Athletes from the United Kingdom of Great Britain and Ireland competed at the 1906 Intercalated Games in Athens, Greece. 47 athletes, all men, competed in 42 events in 9 sports.

== Athletics ==
Track

Athlete	Events	Heat		Semifinals		Final	
Athlete	Events	Result	Rank	Result	Rank	Result	Rank
Wyndham Halswelle	100 metres	Unknown	2 Q	Unknown	3	did not advance	
Sidney Abrahams	100 metres	11.8	1 Q	Unknown	4	did not advance	
Alfred Healey	100 metres	12.2	1 Q	Unknown	4	did not advance	
Reginald Reed	100 metres	12.0	1 Q	did not start		did not advance	
Wyndham Halswelle	400 metres	54.0	1 Q	n/a		Unknown	2nd place, silver medalist(s)
William Anderson	400 metres	Unknown	2 q	54.8	1 Q	Unknown	7
John Horne	400 metres	Unknown	3	did not advance			
Reginald Reed	400 metres	Unknown	4	did not advance			
Wyndham Halswelle	800 metres	Unknown	2 Q	n/a		Unknown	3rd place, bronze medalist(s)
Reginald Crabbe	800 metres	2:07.6	1 Q	n/a		Unknown	4
John Horne	800 metres	Unknown	3	n/a		did not advance	
William Anderson	800 metres	Unknown	4	n/a		did not advance	
John McGough	800 metres	Unknown	Unknown	n/a		did not advance	
John McGough	1500 metres	4:18.8	1 Q	n/a		4:12.6	2nd place, silver medalist(s)
Reginald Crabbe	1500 metres	Unknown	2Q	n/a		Unknown	7
Arnold Churchill	1500 metres	Unknown	Unknown	n/a		did not advance	
Henry Hawtrey	1500 metres	did not finish		n/a		did not advance	
Henry Hawtrey	5 mile	n/a				26:11.8	1st place, gold medalist(s)
Francis Edwards	5 mile	n/a				Unknown	Unknown
John McGough	5 mile	n/a				Unknown	Unknown
Henry Weber	5 mile	n/a				Unknown	Unknown
Arnold Churchill	5 mile	n/a				Unknown	Unknown
Stephen Carnelly	5 mile	n/a				Unknown	Unknown
John Daly	5 mile	n/a				Disqualified	
James Cormack	Marathon	n/a				3-35:00.0	14
John Daly	Marathon	n/a				did not finish	
Alfred Healey	110 metres hurdles	16.5	1 Q	n/a		Unknown	2nd place, silver medalist(s)
Wallis Walters	110 metres hurdles	Unknown	3	n/a		did not advance	
Robert Wilkinson	1500 metre walk	n/a				Disqualified	
Robert Wilkinson	3000 metre walk	n/a				Disqualified	

Field

Athlete	Events	Final	
Athlete	Events	Result	Rank
Con Leahy	High jump	1.775	1st place, gold medalist(s)
Peter O'Connor	High jump	Unknown	Unknown
Peter O'Connor	Long jump	7.025	2nd place, silver medalist(s)
Sidney Abrahams	Long jump	6.210	5
Peter O'Connor	Triple jump	14.075	1st place, gold medalist(s)
Con Leahy	Triple jump	13.980	2nd place, silver medalist(s)

== Cycling ==
Athlete	Events	Heat		Semifinals		Final	
Athlete	Events	Result	Rank	Result	Rank	Result	Rank
William Pett	Individual road race	n/a				did not finish	
Herbert Bouffler	Sprint	n/a				Unknown	2nd place, silver medalist(s)
Herbert Crowther	Sprint	n/a				Unknown	Unknown
Thomas Matthews	Sprint	n/a				Unknown	Unknown
Arthur Rushen	Sprint	n/a				Unknown	Unknown
Herbert Crowther	333 metres time trial	n/a				23 1/5	2nd place, silver medalist(s)
Herbert Bouffler	333 metres time trial	n/a				24 1/5	8
Thomas Matthews	333 metres time trial	n/a				24 1/5	8
Arthur Rushen	333 metres time trial	n/a				24 3/5	15
Thomas Matthews; Arthur Rushen	Tandem sprint 2000 metres	2:32 3/5	1 Q OR	n/a		2:15	(gold) OR
Herbert Crowther	5000 metres	3:56 1/5	1 Q	8:41	1 Q	Unknown	2nd place, silver medalist(s)
Thomas Matthews	5000 metres	Unknown	2	did not advance			
Arthur Rushen	5000 metres	Unknown	2	did not advance			
Herbert Bouffler	5000 metres	3:40 3/5	1 Q	Unknown	3	did not advance	
William Pett	20 kilometres	Unknown	Unknown Q	n/a		29:00	1st place, gold medalist(s)
Herbert Bouffler	20 kilometres	Unknown	Unknown	n/a		did not advance	
Herbert Crowther	20 kilometres	Unknown	Unknown	n/a		did not advance	
Thomas Matthews	20 kilometres	Unknown	Unknown	n/a		did not advance	
Arthur Rushen	20 kilometres	Unknown	Unknown	n/a		did not advance	

== Diving ==
Athlete	Event	Points	Rank
Melville Clark	10 m platform	144.0	5
Harold Smyrk	10 m platform	126.4	17

== Fencing ==
Athlete	Events	Heat Group	Semifinal Group	Final Group
Athlete	Events	Rank	Rank	Rank
Edgar Seligman	Individual Foil	3	did not advance	
Howard de Walden Thomas	Individual Foil	Unknown	did not advance	
Edgar Seligman	Individual Épée	1 Q	Unknown	did not advance
Lord Desborough William; Cosmo Duff-Gordon; Charles Robinson; Edgar Seligman	Épée Team	Germany (GER); 9–2	Belgium (BEL); 14–9	France (FRA); 15–18 (silver)

== Football ==
Although Great Britain didn't send a team, eight British players (all from the same family) represented Smyrna from the Ottoman Empire, they lost their first match 0–5 against Denmark, but then won the silver medal match against one of the Greek sides after the original Greek side defaulted during the final. The eight British silver medal winners were:

- Edward Charnaud
- Zareh Couyoumdjian
- Percy La Fontaine
- Albert Whittall
- Donald Whittall
- Edward Whittall
- Godfrey Whittall
- Herbert Whittall

== Gymnastics ==
Athlete	Events	Final	
Athlete	Events	Result	Rank
Otto Bauscher	Individual All-Around	85	25
Stanley Cooper	Individual All-Around (5 events)	71	35
Otto Bauscher	Individual All-Around (5 events)	69	37
Stanley Cooper	Rope climb	17.6	15

== Rowing ==
The only British rower was Donald Whittall who competed for a mixed team in the coxed fours.

== Shooting ==
Athlete	Event	Target Hits	Points	Rank
Sidney Merlin	Free pistol, 25 metres	30	227	12
Gerald Merlin	Free pistol, 25 metres	30	203	24
Sidney Merlin	Free pistol, 50 metres	29	177	23
Gerald Merlin	Free pistol, 50 metres	28	151	29
Gerald Merlin	Gras Model Revolver, 20 metres	28	162	21
Sidney Merlin	Gras Model Revolver, 20 metres	did not finish		
Sidney Merlin	Military Revolver, 20 metres	30	222	16
Gerald Merlin	Military Revolver, 20 metres	29	191	28
Sidney Merlin	Dueling Pistol Au Visé, 20 metres	30	207	10
Gerald Merlin	Dueling Pistol Au Visé, 20 metres	29	191	16
Gerald Merlin	Dueling Pistol Au Commandement, 25 metres	26	111	4
Sidney Merlin	Dueling Pistol Au Commandement, 25 metres	23	103	7
Gerald Merlin	Free Rifle any position, 300 metres	30	188	24
Sidney Merlin	Free Rifle any position, 300 metres	did not finish		
Gerald Merlin	Rifle Gras Model Kneeling or Standing, 200 metres	26	169	6
Sidney Merlin	Rifle Gras Model Kneeling or Standing, 200 metres	28	166	7
Sidney Merlin	Rifle Kneeling or Standing, 300 metres	30	175	23
Gerald Merlin	Trap single shot 16 metres	n/a	24	1st place, gold medalist(s)
Sidney Merlin	Trap single shot 16 metres	n/a	23	3rd place, bronze medalist(s)
Sidney Merlin	Trap double shot 14 metres	n/a	15	1st place, gold medalist(s)
Gerald Merlin	Trap double shot 14 metres	n/a	12	3rd place, bronze medalist(s)

== Swimming ==
Athlete	Events	Heat		Final	
Athlete	Events	Result	Rank	Result	Rank
Paul Radmilovic	100 metres freestyle	1:41.0	1 Q	Unknown	4
John Derbyshire	100 metres freestyle	Unknown	3 Q	Unknown	5
Henry Taylor	400 metres freestyle	n/a		6:26.0	2nd place, silver medalist(s)
John Jarvis	400 metres freestyle	n/a		Unknown	3rd place, bronze medalist(s)
Paul Radmilovic	400 metres freestyle	n/a		Unknown	5
John Derbyshire	400 metres freestyle	n/a		Unknown	Unknown
Henry Taylor	One mile freestyle	n/a		28:28.0	1st place, gold medalist(s)
John Jarvis	One mile freestyle	n/a		30:07.6	2nd place, silver medalist(s)
Stanley Cooper	One mile freestyle	n/a		did not finish	
Paul Radmilovic	One mile freestyle	n/a		did not finish	
William Henry; John Derbyshire; Henry Taylor; John Jarvis	4 x 250 metres freestyle relay	n/a		Unknown	3rd place, bronze medalist(s)
