= Charles Davies (athlete) =

British sprinter (1881–1964)

Personal information
- Born: 28 September 1881 London, England
- Died: 13 August 1964 (aged 82) Bedfordshire, England

Sport
- Sport: Athletics
- Event: Sprints
- Club: Polytechnic Harriers

Charles Christie Davies (28 September 1881 – 13 August 1964) was a British sprint athlete. He competed at the 1908 Summer Olympics in London.

== Biography ==
Davies finished third behind Edwin Montague in the 440 yards event at the 1907 AAA Championships.

At the 1908 Olympic Games he represented Great Britain at the 1908 Summer Olympics in London, in the 400 metres, Davies won his preliminary heat with a time of 50.4 seconds to advance to the semifinals. There, he dropped his time to 49.8 seconds, but still lost to John Carpenter who ran the course in 49.4 seconds. Davies did not advance to the final.
