= Horace Ramey =

American athlete (1885–1974)

Horace Patton Ramey (February 12, 1885, Virginia – September 15, 1974, Sun City, Arizona) was an American athlete. He competed at the 1908 Summer Olympics in London.

Ramey won his preliminary heat of the 400 metres with a time of 51.0 seconds, advancing to the semifinals. There, he placed second to John Taylor in his semifinal heat. Ramey's time was 50.5 seconds; Taylor's was less than a second faster at 49.8 seconds. Ramey did not advance to the final.

In the 800 metres, Ramey did not finish his semifinal heat and did not advance to the final.

== Sources ==
- Cook, Theodore Andrea (1908). The Fourth Olympiad, Being the Official Report. London: British Olympic Association.
- De Wael, Herman (2001). "Athletics 1908". Herman's Full Olympians. Archived from the original on 27 September 2006.
- Wudarski, Pawel (1999). "Wyniki Igrzysk Olimpijskich" (in Polish).
