= Frederick de Selding =

American sprinter

Frederick Monroe de Selding (22 June 1887 – 25 November 1971, in Hackettstown, New Jersey) was an American athlete. He competed at the 1908 Summer Olympics in London.

In the 400 metres, de Selding placed second in his preliminary heat to Wyndham Halswelle, the eventual gold medalist. De Selding's time was 50.8 seconds. He did not advance to the semifinals.

He graduated from Harvard University.

== Sources ==
- Cook, Theodore Andrea (1908). The Fourth Olympiad, Being the Official Report. London: British Olympic Association.
- De Wael, Herman (2001). "Athletics 1908". Herman's Full Olympians. Archived from the original on 27 September 2006.
- Wudarski, Pawel (1999). "Wyniki Igrzysk Olimpijskich" (in Polish). Archived from the original on 16 February 2009.
