= Edward Ryle =

British athlete

Personal information
- Born: 1 October 1885 Cambridge, England
- Died: 5 April 1952 (aged 66) Navan, Meath, Ireland

Sport
- Sport: Athletics
- Event: 440y/400m
- Club: University of Cambridge AC; Achilles Club

Edward Hewish Ryle (1 October 1885 – 5 April 1952) was a British track and field athlete competing in the 400 metres at the 1908 Summer Olympics in London.

== Biography ==
Born in Cambridge, he was educated at Trinity College, Cambridge and was successful at Fives before his talent for running was discovered.

Ryle finished second behind Wyndham Halswelle in the 440 yards event at the 1908 AAA Championships.

At the 1908 Olympic Games, Montague won his preliminary heat in the 400 metres in a walkover. He placed third in his semifinal to be eliminated from competition.

Ryle once again finished second in the 440 yards event at the 1910 AAA Championships.
