= Robert Robb =

British athlete

Personal information
- Nationality: British (Northern Irish)
- Born: 20 February 1882 Belfast, Northern Ireland
- Died: 23 October 1941 (aged 59) Claygate, Surrey, England

Sport
- Sport: Athletics
- Event: 400m/440y
- Club: Cliftonville AC

Robert Campbell Robb (20 February 1882 – 23 October 1941) was a Northern Irish athlete who competed at the 1908 Summer Olympics.

== Biography ==
Robb was nicknamed Bertie and was the son of a prominent Belfast merchant Kirker Robb. He competed for the Belfast-based athletic club Cliftonville AC and was runner-up at the Irish Championships in 1907 and 1908.

He represented Great Britain at the 1908 Summer Olympics in London. In the 400 metres, Robb lost his preliminary heat with a time of 52.5 seconds to winner Ned Merriam's 52.2 seconds. Robb did not advance to the semifinals.

Robb and his brother Victor founded a car engineering company and Robert took out an aviator's licence in 1916. His brother Victor died of sepsis after being shot during World War I.

== Sources ==
- Cook, Theodore Andrea (1908). The Fourth Olympiad, Being the Official Report. London: British Olympic Association.
- De Wael, Herman (2001). "Athletics 1908". Herman's Full Olympians. Archived from the original on 27 September 2006.
- Wudarski, Pawel (1999). "Wyniki Igrzysk Olimpijskich" (in Polish).
