= Halswelle =

Halswelle is a surname. Notable people with the surname include:

- Keeley Halswelle (1831–1891), English artist
- Wyndham Halswelle (1882–1915), British athlete
