= Alan Patterson (athlete) =

British athlete

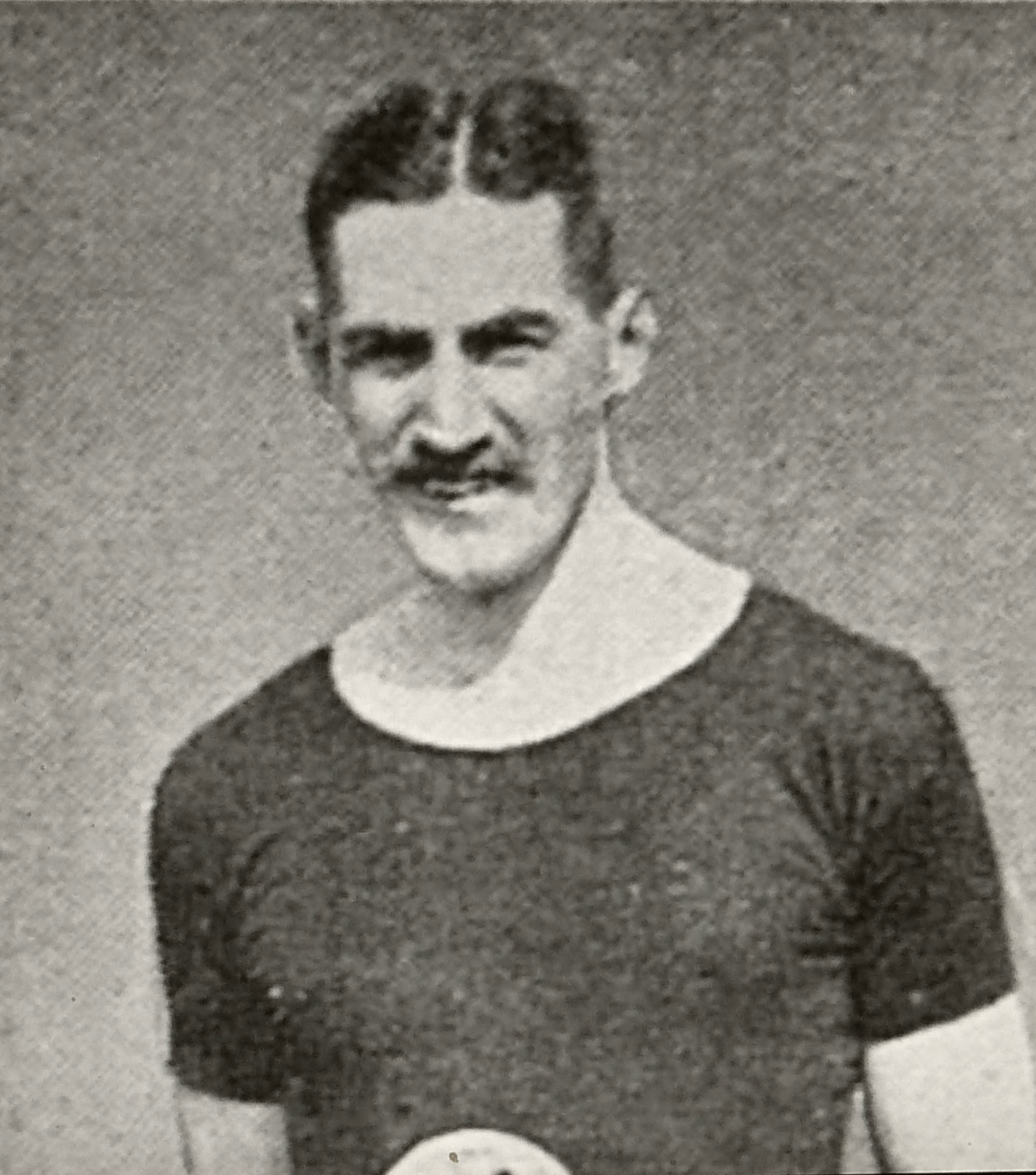

Personal information
- Nationality: British
- Born: 12 March 1886 Deal, Kent
- Died: 14 March 1916 (aged 30) Vermelles, Pas-de-Calais
- Resting place: Fosse 7 Military Cemetery

Sport
- Country: United Kingdom
- Sport: Athletics
- Event: 400m/800m
- Club: Sheffield United Harriers

Achievements and titles
- Olympic finals: 1908 and 1912

Alan Patterson (12 March 1886 – 14 March 1916) was a British track and field athlete who specialised in the 400 metres and 800 metres. He ran for the Sheffield United Harriers and the Salford Harriers and competed in the 1908 and 1912 Summer Olympics.

== Background ==
Patterson was born in Deal, Kent.

== Army career ==
Patterson was a lieutenant and then a captain in the British Army. Between the 1908 and 1912 Olympics, he served in India.

== Sports ==
Patterson ran for the Sheffield United Harriers, and later the Salford Harriers, and competed at the 1908 Summer Olympics in London and at the 1912 Summer Olympics in Stockholm.

In the 400 metres event in 1908, Patterson took second place in his preliminary heat with a time of 50.6 seconds to winner John Atlee's 50.4 seconds. Due to his loss, Patterson did not advance to the semifinals.

Four years later, he was eliminated in the first round of the 400 metres competition as well as of the 800 metres event.

Patterson became the National 440 yards champion after winning the AAA Championships title at the 1909 AAA Championships.

== Death ==
Patterson was killed in action at age 30 during the First World War in Vermelles, Pas-de-Calais, serving as a captain with the Royal Artillery near Mazingarbe. He is buried at the Fosse 7 Military Cemetery nearby.

== See also ==
- List of Olympians killed in World War I
