= Arvid Ringstrand =

Swedish sprinter

Arvid Ringstrand (February 3, 1888 – December 1, 1957) was a Swedish athlete. He competed at the 1908 Summer Olympics in London. In the 400 metres, Ringstrand finished third in his preliminary heat and did not advance to the semifinals.

== Sources ==
- Cook, Theodore Andrea (1908). The Fourth Olympiad, Being the Official Report. London: British Olympic Association.
- De Wael, Herman (2001). "Athletics 1908". Herman's Full Olympians. Archived from the original on 27 September 2006.
- Wudarski, Pawel (1999). "Wyniki Igrzysk Olimpijskich" (in Polish). Archived from the original on 14 June 2006.
