= G. W. Young =

G. W. Young may refer to:

- Geoffrey Winthrop Young (1876–1958), British climber, poet and educator
- G. W. Young (athlete), British track and field athlete who competed at the 1908 Summer Olympics in London
