= Cycling at the 1906 Intercalated Games =

Men's cycling at the 1906 Intercalated Games
- Dates: April 23–25
- Competitors: 45 from 11 nations

At the 1906 Summer Olympics in Athens, six cycling events were contested, all for men only. Now called the Intercalated Games, the 1906 Games are no longer considered as an official Olympic Games by the International Olympic Committee.

== Medal summary ==
| Games | Gold | Silver | Bronze |
|---|---|---|---|
| Road race | Fernand Vast; France | Maurice Bardonneau; France | Edmond Luguet; France |
| Sprint | Francesco Verri; Italy | Herbert Bouffler; Great Britain | Eugène Debongnie; Belgium |
| Tandem | John Matthews and Arthur Rushen; Great Britain | Bruno Götze and Max Götze; Germany | Karl Arnold and Otto Küpferling; Germany |
| Time trial | Francesco Verri; Italy | Herbert Crowther; Great Britain | Henri Menjou; France |
| 5 km | Francesco Verri; Italy | Herbert Crowther; Great Britain | Fernand Vast; France |
| 20 km | William Pett; Great Britain | Maurice Bardonneau; France | Fernand Vast; France |

== Participating nations ==
45 cyclists from 11 nations competed.

- Austria (4)
- Belgium (3)
- Denmark (1)
- Egypt (1)
- France (7)
- Germany (8)
- Great Britain (5)
- Greece (10)
- Italy (3)
- Sweden (1)
- Switzerland (2)

== Medal table ==
| Rank | Nation | Gold | Silver | Bronze | Total |
|---|---|---|---|---|---|
| 1 | Italy (ITA) | 3 | 0 | 0 | 3 |
| 2 | Great Britain (GBR) | 2 | 3 | 0 | 5 |
| 3 | France (FRA) | 1 | 2 | 4 | 7 |
| 4 | Germany (GER) | 0 | 1 | 1 | 2 |
| 5 | Belgium (BEL) | 0 | 0 | 1 | 1 |
| Totals (5 entries) | | 6 | 6 | 6 | 18 |
