= Fernand Vast =

French cyclist

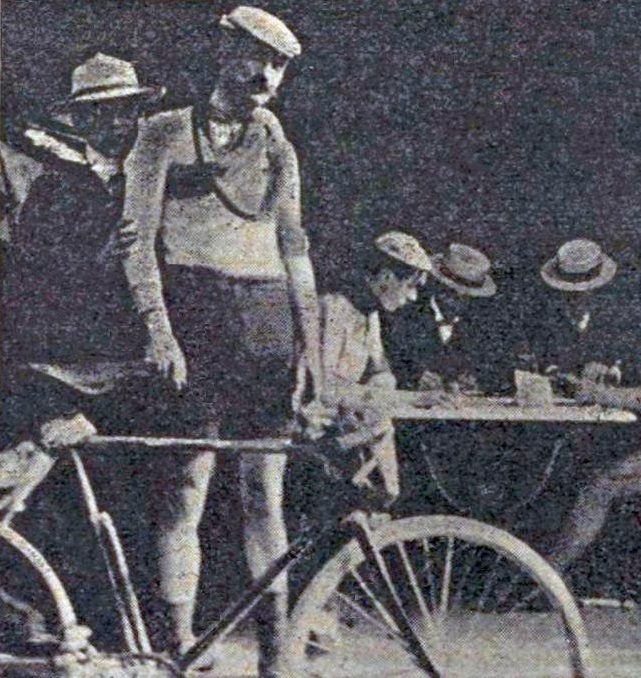
- Fernand Vast during the 1903 Paris-Troyes race

Personal information
- Born: 26 May 1886 Garches, Hauts-de-Seine, France
- Died: 7 June 1968 (aged 82) Saint-Cloud, Hauts-de-Seine, France

Cycling career
- Sport: Cycling
Medal record
Cycling
Intercalated Games
Representing France
| Gold medal – first place | 1906 Athens | Road race |
| Bronze medal – third place | 1906 Athens | 5km |
| Bronze medal – third place | 1906 Athens | 20km |

Fernand Vast (26 May 1886 – 7 June 1968) was a French cyclist, who won the road race at the 1906 Intercalated Games in Athens, Greece.

== Career ==
In 1903, Vast came fifth in the Amateurs event at the 1903 French National Road Race Championships. In the same year, he came second at the Paris–Troyes race. In 1905, Vast came second at the France amateur middle-distance championship, behind his coach. He won the Amateurs event at the 1905 French National Road Race Championships.

Vast won the road race at the 1906 Intercalated Games in Athens, Greece. The race ended in a sprint, where Vast beat Maurice Bardonneau, one of the race favourites. Vast also finished third in the 5,000m and 20 km track events. After the Games, Vast became a professional cyclist, and came fifth in the 1906 Paris-Brussels race. In the same year, he also came second at the 10 km "Athens Grand Prix" event, held on Bastille Day. Vast finished 20 metres (66 ft) behind race winner Maurice Bardonneau. In 1907, he came 11th at the French Road Championships, and 15th in the Paris–Tours race.
