= Victor Jacquemin =

Belgian sprinter

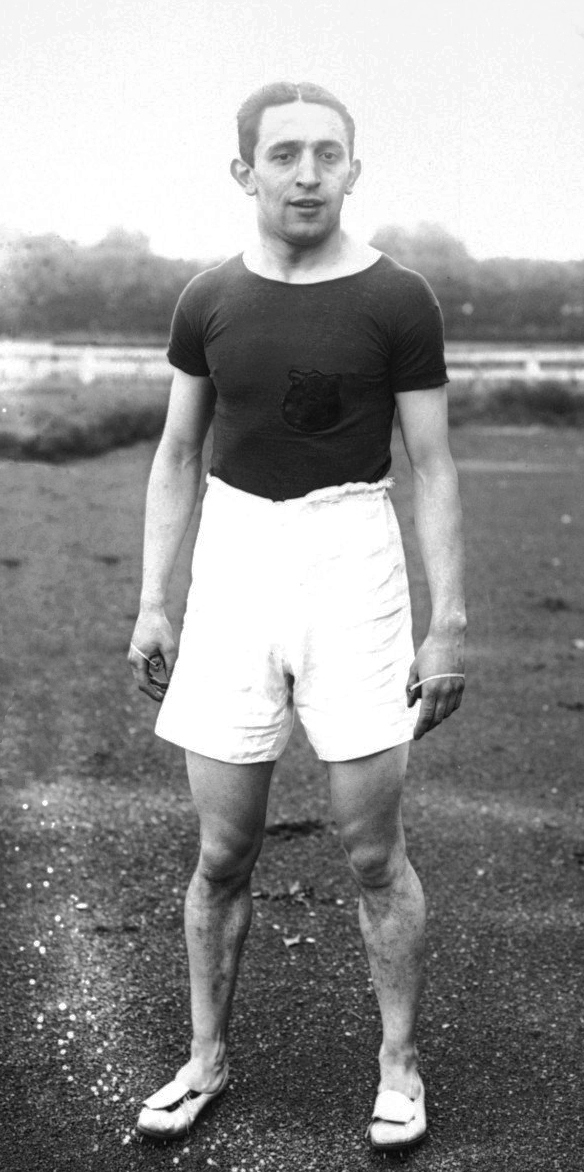
- Victor Jacquemin in 1913

Personal information
- Born: 12 March 1892
- Died: Unknown

Sport
- Sport: Athletics
- Event: 100–400 m

Achievements and titles
- Personal bests: 100 m – 11.2 (1908); 400 m – 50.0 (1914)

Victor Jacquemin (born 12 March 1892, date of death unknown) was a Belgian sprinter. He competed at the 1908 Summer Olympics in London, but failed to reach the finals of the 100 m and 400 m events.
