= Giuseppe Tarella =

Italian athlete

Personal information
- Nationality: Italian
- Born: 7 May 1883 Turin, Italy
- Died: 17 January 1968 (aged 84)

Sport
- Country: Italy
- Sport: Athletics
- Event: Sprint
- Club: Audace Torino

Giuseppe Tarella (May 7, 1883 – January 17, 1968) was an Italian athlete. He competed at the 1908 Summer Olympics in London. He was born in Turin.

== Biography ==
In the 400 metres event, Tarella finished fourth in his three-man preliminary heat and did not advance to the semifinals.

== Achievements ==
Year	Competition	Venue	Position	Event	Performance	Note
1908	Olympic Games	(United Kingdom) London	heat	400 metres	-	

== See also ==
- Italy at the 1908 Summer Olympics

== Notes ==
- Cook, Theodore Andrea (1908). The Fourth Olympiad, Being the Official Report. London: British Olympic Association.
- De Wael, Herman (2001). "Athletics 1908". Herman's Full Olympians. Archived from the original on 27 September 2006.
- Wudarski, Pawel (1999). "Wyniki Igrzysk Olimpijskich" (in Polish). Archived from the original on 16 February 2009.
