= Roberto Penna =

Italian athlete

Personal information
- Nationality: Italian
- Born: 19 April 1886 Alessandria, Italy
- Died: 17 June 1963 (aged 77)

Sport
- Country: Italy
- Sport: Athletics
- Event: Sprint
- Club: Sport Pedestre Genova

Roberto Penna (19 April 1886 – 17 June 1963) was an Italian athlete. He competed at the 1908 Summer Olympics in London.

== Biography ==
Penna placed second with a time of 52.4 seconds in his preliminary heat of the 400 metres, not advancing to the semifinals.

== Achievements ==
Year	Competition	Venue	Position	Event	Performance	Note
1908	Olympic Games	(United Kingdom) London	heat	100 metres	-	

== Notes ==
- Cook, Theodore Andrea (1908). The Fourth Olympiad, Being the Official Report. London: British Olympic Association.
- De Wael, Herman (2001). "Athletics 1908". Herman's Full Olympians. Archived from the original on 27 September 2006.
- Wudarski, Pawel (1999). "Wyniki Igrzysk Olimpijskich" (in Polish).
