= Richard Quinn (athlete) =

British athlete

Personal information
- Nationality: British (Scottish)
- Born: 3 December 1882 Ayr, Scotland
- Died: 6 November 1925 (aged 42) Hamilton, Ontario, Canada

Sport
- Sport: Athletics
- Event: Racewalking
- Club: Bellahouston Harriers

Richard Quinn (3 December 1882 – 6 November 1925) was a British track and field athlete who competed in the 1908 Summer Olympics.

== Biography ==
Born in Ayr, he won seven straight Scottish walks titles over the three-mile distance In 1907 he joined the Bellahouston Harriers of Glasgow, after leaving the Motherwell Harriers.

He represented Great Britain at the 1908 Summer Olympics in London, where he competed in the men's 3500 metres walk being disqualified in heat two and taking no further part.
