= John Atlee =

John Atlee may refer to:

- John Atlee (athlete) (1882–1958), American athlete
- John Light Atlee (1799–1885), American physician
- Samuel John Atlee (1739–1786), American soldier and statesman
- John Yorke AtLee (1853–1933), recording artist in the 1890s in the United States

== See also ==
- John Attlee, 3rd Earl Attlee (born 1956), British peer
