= Edwin Montague =

British athlete (1885–1937)

Personal information
- Born: 13 April 1885 Lambeth, London, England
- Died: 28 December 1937 (aged 52) Fulham, London, England

Sport
- Sport: Athletics
- Event: 400m/440y
- Club: South London Harriers

Edwin Herbert Montague (13 April 1885 – 28 December 1937) was a British athlete. He competed at the 1908 Summer Olympics in London.

== Biography ==
Montague finished third in the 440 yards AAA Championships event at the 1903 AAA Championships and second at the 1904 AAA Championships. Another third place at the 1905 AAA Championships was followed by him finally winning the 440 yards title at the 1907 AAA Championships.

At the 1908 Olympic Games, Montague won his preliminary heat in the 400 metres with a time of 50.2 seconds. He dropped his time to 49.8 seconds in the semifinals but lost to Wyndam Halswelle, who set a new Olympic record at 48.4 seconds in the race. Montague's second-place finish in the semifinals prevented him from advancing to the final.

He was also a member of the British team, which was eliminated in the first round of the medley relay event by the United States.

== Sources ==
- Cook, Theodore Andrea (1908). The Fourth Olympiad, Being the Official Report. London: British Olympic Association.
- De Wael, Herman (2001). "Athletics 1908". Herman's Full Olympians. Archived from the original on 27 September 2006.
- Wudarski, Pawel (1999). "Wyniki Igrzysk Olimpijskich" (in Polish). Archived from the original on 16 February 2009.
