= Athletics at the 1908 Summer Olympics – Men's 400 metres =

Men's 400 metres at the Games of the IV Olympiad
- Venue: White City Stadium
- Dates: 21 July 1908 (quarterfinals); 22 July 1908 (semifinals); 23 July 1908 (final)
- Competitors: 37 from 11 nations
- Winning time: 50.0

Medalists
1st place, gold medalist(s)		Wyndham Halswelle	Great Britain

The men's 400 metres was an Olympic event for the fourth time at the 1908 Summer Olympics in London. The competition was held from 21 July 1908, to 23 July 1908. The rerun of the final was held on 25 July 1908. The races were held on a track of 536.45 metres=1/3 mile in circumference.

37 runners from 11 nations competed. NOCs could enter up to 12 athletes.

It was the most controversial event of the London Games: the final resulted in the disqualification of American runner John Carpenter who was accused by the British officials of a manoeuvre that was legal under American rules (under which Carpenter normally competed) but prohibited by the British rules under which the race was run.

As part of the disqualification of Carpenter, a second final race was ordered, with Halswelle to face the other two finalists again. These athletes, William Robbins and John Taylor, were both Americans, and they boycotted the re-run final to protest the judges' decision.

Thus, Halswelle was the only medallist in the 400 metres.

== Background ==
This was the fourth time the event was held. Only one of the runners from 1904, Paul Pilgrim of the United States, returned. Defending gold medalist Harry Hillman, also American, was in London but competed only in the hurdles. The favorite was British runner Wyndham Halswelle, the 1905, 1906, and 1908 AAA champion.

Belgium, Sweden, and the Netherlands appeared in the event for the first time. The United States made its fourth appearance in the event, the only nation to compete in it at the first four Olympic Games.

== Competition format ==
The competition consisted of three rounds. The first round had 16 heats, ranging from 0 to 4 runners (the second heat was cancelled because no athletes started). Only the top runner in each heat advanced to the semifinals. The semifinal was to consist of 4 heats of 4 runners each, but the final heat had only 3 runners due to the cancellation of the second heat in the first round. Again, only the top runner in each semifinal heat advanced, making a four-man final.

== Records ==
These were the standing world and Olympic records (in seconds) prior to the 1908 Summer Olympics.

World record	Maxie Long (USA)	47.8(*)	New York, United States	29 September 1900
Olympic record	Harry Hillman (USA)	49.2(**)	St. Louis, United States	29 August 1904

(*) 440 yards (= 402.34 m)

(**) This track was 536.45 metres=1/3 mile in circumference.

In the semi-finals Wyndham Halswelle set a new Olympic record with 48.4 seconds.

== Schedule ==
Date	Time	Round
Tuesday, 21 July 1908		Round 1
Wednesday, 22 July 1908	17:30	Semifinals
Thursday, 23 July 1908	17:30	Final (original)
Saturday, 25 July 1908	12:00	Final (rerun)

== Results ==
=== Heats ===
The heats were run on 21 July 1908. The winner of each advanced to the semifinals, with all other runners eliminated.

==== Heat 1 ====
Montague led by twelve yards when he finished.

Rank	Athlete	Nation	Time	Notes
1	Edwin Montague	Great Britain	50.2	Q
2	Paul Pilgrim	United States	51.4	

==== Heat 2 ====
The second heat was scratched as there were no starters.

==== Heat 3 ====
Ryle had no competition in the third heat.

Rank	Athlete	Nation	Time	Notes
1	Edward Ryle	Great Britain	walkover	Q

==== Heat 4 ====
Taylor won by twelve yards.

Rank	Athlete	Nation	Time	Notes
1	John Taylor	United States	50.8	Q
2	Roberto Penna	Italy	52.4	
3	Sven Låftman	Sweden	Unknown	

==== Heat 5 ====
Nicol won easily, holding a twelve-yard lead over Guttormsen as he crossed the finish line.

Rank	Athlete	Nation	Time	Notes
1	George Nicol	Great Britain	50.8	Q
2	Oscar Guttormsen	Norway	52.4	

==== Heat 6 ====
Eight yards separated the two runners when Malfait crossed the line.

Rank	Athlete	Nation	Time	Notes
1	Georges Malfait	France	50.0	Q
2	Donald Buddo	Canada	51.2	

==== Heat 7 ====
Robbins had no difficulty in this race, leading from start to finish to win by six yards.

Rank	Athlete	Nation	Time	Notes
1	William Robbins	United States	50.4	Q
2	József Nagy	Hungary	51.1	
3	Noel Godfrey Chavasse	Great Britain	Unknown	
4	Victor Henny	Netherlands	Unknown	

==== Heat 8 ====
Prout's lead was only two yards when he finished.

Rank	Athlete	Nation	Time	Notes
1	William C. Prout	United States	50.4	Q
2	Christopher Maude Chavasse	Great Britain	50.7	

==== Heat 9 ====
Ramey's victory was one of the closest of the first round, with only a yard and a half separating him from Astley.

Rank	Athlete	Nation	Time	Notes
1	Horace Ramey	United States	51.0	Q
2	Arthur Astley	Great Britain	Unknown	

==== Heat 10 ====
Jacquemin took an early lead, but pulled up lame, allowing Sebert to win by 20 yards.

Rank	Athlete	Nation	Time	Notes
1	Louis Sebert	Canada	50.2	Q
2	Massimo Cartasegna	Italy	52.7	
—	Victor Jacquemin	Belgium	DNF	

==== Heat 11 ====
Rank	Athlete	Nation	Time	Notes
1	John Atlee	United States	50.4	Q
2	Alan Patterson	Great Britain	50.6	
3	Giuseppe Tarella	Italy	Unknown	

==== Heat 12 ====
Rank	Athlete	Nation	Time	Notes
1	Charles Davies	Great Britain	50.4	Q
2	Cornelis den Held	Netherlands	51.0	

==== Heat 13 ====
Rank	Athlete	Nation	Time	Notes
1	Ned Merriam	United States	52.2	Q
2	Robert Robb	Great Britain	52.5	

==== Heat 14 ====
Rank	Athlete	Nation	Time	Notes
1	John Carpenter	United States	49.8	Q
2	Otto Trieloff	Germany	50.9	
3	Arvid Ringstrand	Sweden	Unknown	
4	Henk van der Wal	Netherlands	Unknown	

==== Heat 15 ====
Rank	Athlete	Nation	Time	Notes
1	Wyndham Halswelle	Great Britain	49.4	Q
2	Frederick de Selding	United States	50.8	
3	Bram Evers	Netherlands	Unknown	

==== Heat 16 ====
Young won by 30 yards.

Rank	Athlete	Nation	Time	Notes
1	George Young	Great Britain	52.4	Q
2	Jacobus Hoogveld	Netherlands	54.3	

=== Semifinals ===
The semifinals were held on 22 July 1908. Winners advanced, all others were eliminated.

==== Semifinal 1 ====
Carpenter led throughout, with Davies challenging him at the end. Carpenter was "slowing fast in the last thirty yards" but managed to hold off Davies and win "by three yards."

Rank	Athlete	Nation	Time	Notes
1	John Carpenter	United States	49.4	Q
2	Charles Davies	Great Britain	49.8	
3	Ned Merriam	United States	Unknown	
4	George Young	Great Britain	Unknown	

==== Semifinal 2 ====
Halswelle broke the Olympic record in this semifinal. He took the lead early and "was right away at the half distance," ultimately winning "by 12 yards."

Rank	Athlete	Nation	Time	Notes
1	Wyndham Halswelle	Great Britain	48.4	Q, OR
2	Edwin Montague	Great Britain	49.8	
3	George Nicol	Great Britain	Unknown	
4	William C. Prout	United States	Unknown	

==== Semifinal 3 ====
Malfait took the lead at the start. Taylor caught him at 300 yards.

Rank	Athlete	Nation	Time	Notes
1	John Taylor	United States	49.8	Q
2	Horace Ramey	United States	50.5	
3	Edward Ryle	Great Britain	Unknown	
4	Georges Malfait	France	Unknown	

==== Semifinal 4 ====
Sebert started slow, but then lengthened his stride to pass Atlee and nearly catch Robbins, who held him off to win "by 3 yards."

Rank	Athlete	Nation	Time	Notes
1	William Robbins	United States	49.0	Q
2	Louis Sebert	Canada	49.5	
3	John Atlee	United States	Unknown	

=== Final ===
The final was initially held on 23 July 1908. After the disqualification of Carpenter, a re-run of the final was scheduled for 25 July.

First running

The first final ended with Carpenter winning ahead of Halswelle with Robbins in third, and Taylor last.

Roscoe Badger, one of the British umpires of the event, noticed Carpenter had maneuvered so as to prevent Halswelle from passing him; this was legal at the time under the American rules under which Carpenter normally competed, but prohibited by the British rules that were in effect for the Olympics.

Badger therefore signalled to the judges to declare the race null and void: his decision led to a thirty-minute argument between British and American team members.

At the official inquiry later that day, the judges upheld Badger's complaint, and Carpenter was disqualified. It was also ordered that the final be re-run with Carpenter excluded.

Rank	Athlete	Nation	Time
1	John Carpenter	United States	47.8
2	Wyndham Halswelle	Great Britain	Unknown
3	William Robbins	United States	Unknown
4	John Taylor	United States	Unknown

Second running

After the judges ruled that Carpenter was disqualified and barred from starting in the re-run, Robbins and Taylor withdrew in protest.

Halswelle, now assured of the gold medal, won in the only walkover in Olympic track and field history.

Rank	Athlete	Nation	Time
1st place, gold medalist(s)	Wyndham Halswelle	Great Britain	50.0
—	William Robbins	United States	DNS
—	John Taylor	United States	DNS
—	John Carpenter	United States	DSQ
