= William Robbins (athlete) =

American athlete (1885–1962)

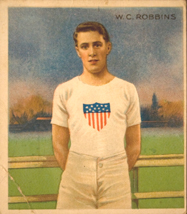
William C. Robbins, wearing the 1908 U.S. Olympic team shirt, from the 1910 Mecca Cigarettes Champion Athlete & Prize Fighter Series trading card.

William Corbett Robbins (August 9, 1885 – July 30, 1962) was an American athlete and a member of the Irish American Athletic Club. He was born in Cambridge, Massachusetts. In 1908, he was involved in a controversial race in the final of the Men's 400 metres and was later part of a team which broke the world's record for the one mile relay.

== 1908 Summer Olympics ==
Robbins advanced to the finals in the 400 metres race at the 1908 Summer Olympics, winning his preliminary heat with a time of 50.4 seconds and his semifinal in 49.0 seconds. In the first running of the final race, Robbins finished in front. However, teammate John Carpenter was disqualified after being accused of obstructing British runner Wyndham Halswelle, and the race was ordered to be repeated without Carpenter. Robbins and fellow American John Taylor refused to compete in the second final in protest of Carpenter's disqualification. Halswelle ran the race alone and was presented with the Gold medal. This race is the only case of a walkover in Olympic history.

According to Robbins' 1910 trading card, he was "one of the best quarter-milers in the United States. He was... (a) Cornell University student, and first came to prominence by the part he played in the 400-meter race held at London in 1908. 'Yank,' as he (was) called by his team mates, ran the first 300 yards at such a clip that it 'pulled the great Halswell's cork,' the later finishing in third place. Robbins won the Metropolitan Amateur Athletic Union quarter-mile championship in September 1909, and two weeks later captured the Canadian quarter-mile title, running the distance in the great time of 48 4/5 seconds."

== 1 Mile Relay World's Record ==
At the Amateur Athletic Union metropolitan championships held at Travers Island in 1909, Robbins was part of the Irish American Athletic Club's four-man relay team that broke the world's record for the one mile relay, with a time of 3 minutes 20 2/5 seconds. The other three men on the record-breaking team were C.S. Cassara, James Rosenberger, and Melvin Sheppard.
