= Herbert Bouffler =

British cyclist

Personal information
- Full name: Herbert Clifford Bouffler
- Born: 16 February 1881 Hackney, London, England
- Died: 27 November 1931 (aged 50) Durban, South Africa

Cycling career
- Sport: Cycling
Medal record
Representing United Kingdom
Men's cycling
Olympic Games
Silver medal – second place	Athens 1906	Sprint

Herbert Bouffler (16 February 1881 – 27 November 1931) was a British cyclist. He won a silver medal at the 1906 Intercalated Games and competed in the 20km event at the 1908 Summer Olympics.
