= Ned Merriam =

American athlete and coach (1884–1956)

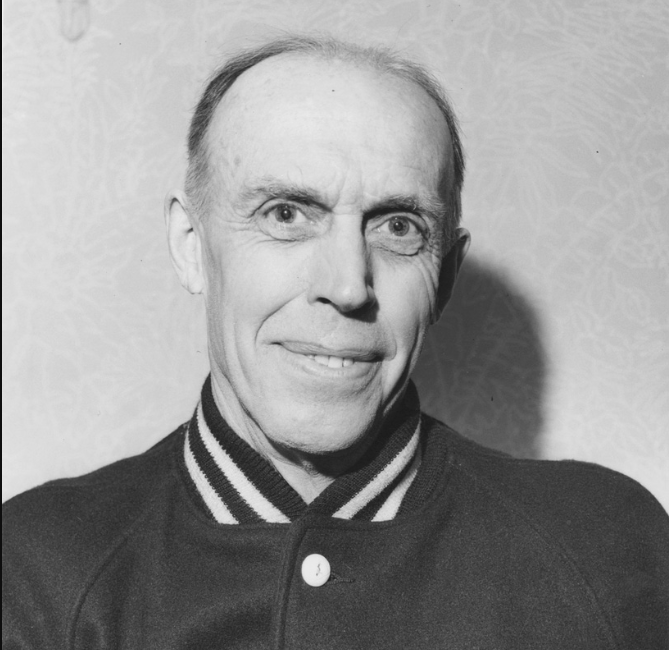

Biographical details
- Born: October 26, 1884; Wisconsin, U.S.
- Died: July 9, 1956 (aged 71); Tinley Park, Illinois, U.S.

Playing career

Football
- 1905–1907: Chicago
- Position: Fullback

Coaching career (HC unless noted)

Football
- 1908: Texas A&M

Track
- 1913–1921: Iowa State
- 1921–1922: DePauw
- 1922–1924: Yale
- 1927–1928: Chicago (assistant)
- 1928–1949: Chicago

Head coaching record
- Overall: 3–5 (football)

Ned Alvin Merriam (October 26, 1884 – July 9, 1956) was an American track athlete, college football player, and coach of track and football.

Merriam attended the University of Chicago, where he starred in football and track between 1905 and 1908. He was a member of the American track and field team at the 1908 Summer Olympics in London. In the 400 metres, Merriam won his preliminary heat with a time of 52.2 seconds. He advanced to the semifinals, where he finished third in his heat to be eliminated from further competition—the only 400-meter race he ever lost.

Merriam later coached track at Iowa State University, Texas A&M University, DePauw University, and Yale University. He was head track coach at the University of Chicago from 1929 until his retirement in 1950. He died of leukemia in Chicago in 1956.

In 2011, Merriam was inducted into the University of Chicago Athletics Hall of Fame. His plaque states that he was a three-time Big 10 champion in the 440-yard dash and a member of the U.S. Olympic Team, serving as head track and field coach from 1929 to 1949.

== Head coaching record ==
=== Football ===
Year	Team	Overall	Conference	Standing	Bowl/playoffs
Texas A&M Aggies (Independent) (1908)
1908	Texas A&M	3–5			
Texas A&M:		3–5			
Total:		3–5			
