= John Taylor (relay runner) =

American athlete (1882–1908)

John Baxter Taylor Jr.
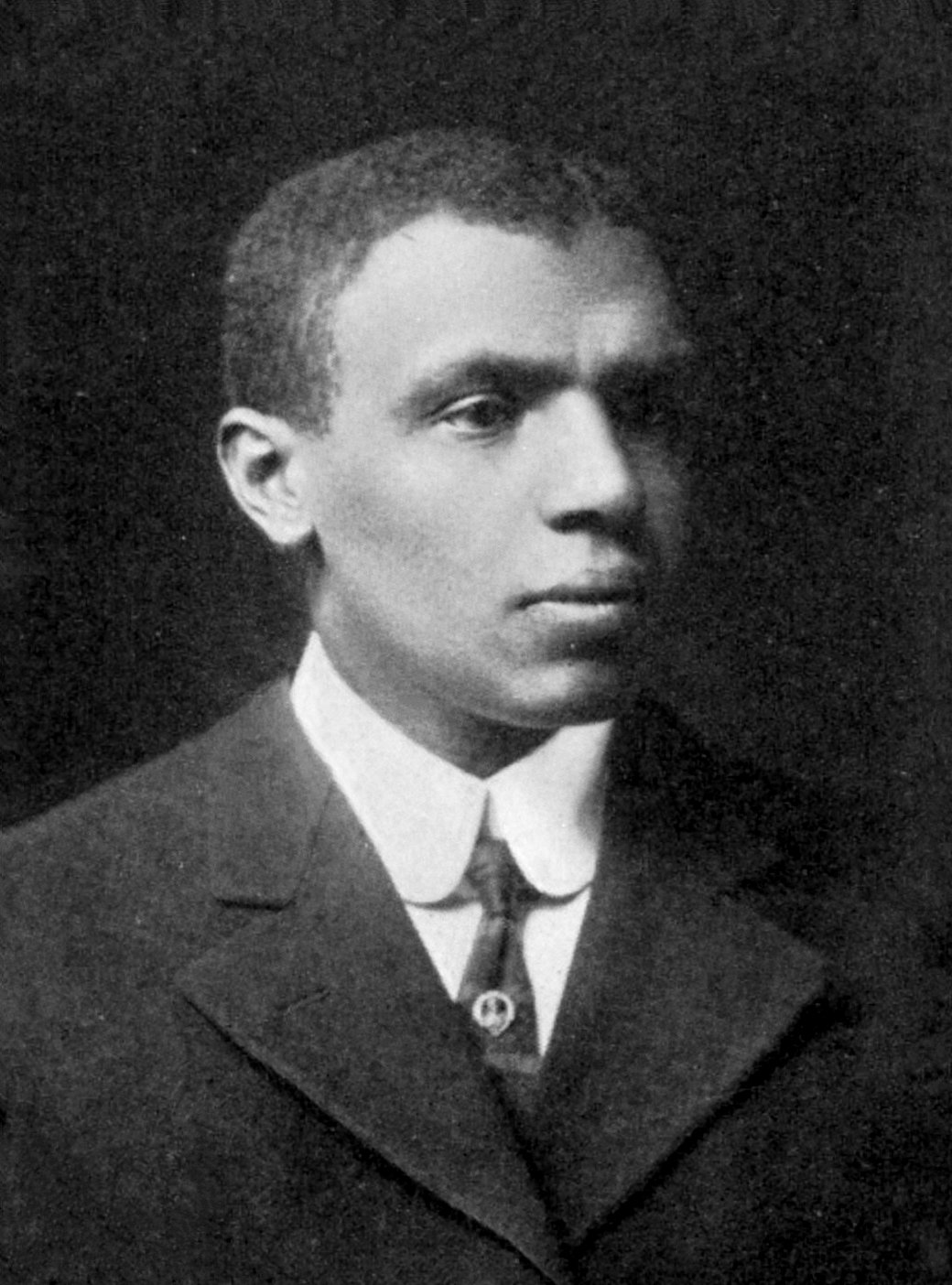
- Born: November 3, 1882; Washington, D.C., US
- Died: December 2, 1908 (aged 26); Philadelphia, Pennsylvania, US
- Education: University of Pennsylvania School of Veterinary Medicine
- Occupation: Athlete
- Known for: First African American to win an Olympic gold medal

John Taylor
Medal record

Men's athletics

Representing the United States

Olympic Games
Gold medal – first place	1908 London	Medley relay

John Baxter Taylor Jr. (November 3, 1882, Washington, D.C. – December 2, 1908, Philadelphia, Pennsylvania) was an American track and field athlete, notable as the first African American on a United States Olympic team and the first to win an Olympic gold medal.

== Biography ==
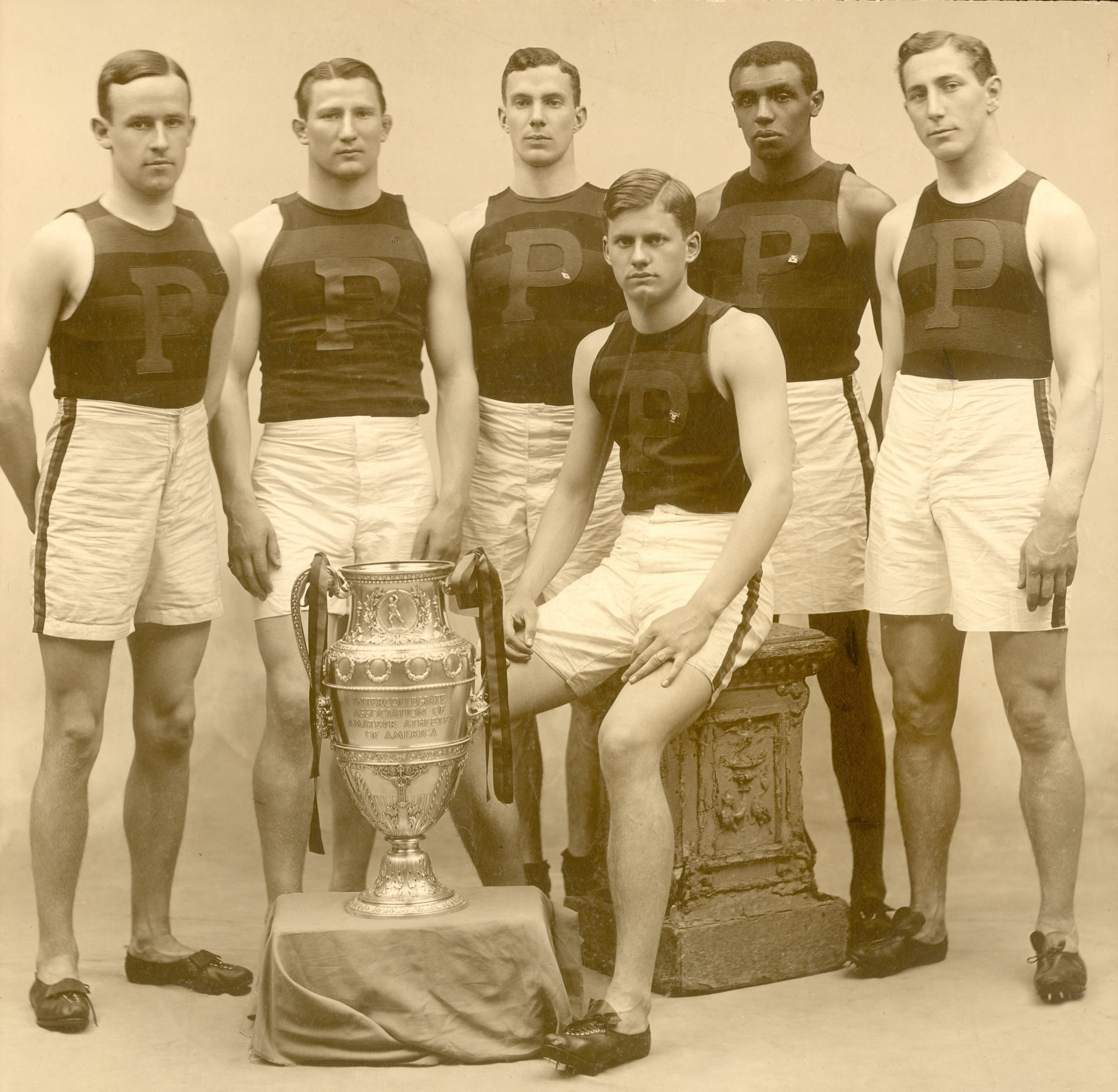
University of Pennsylvania Men's Track team that was the 1907 IC4A point winner: Left to Right: Guy Haskins, R.C. Folwell, T.R. Moffitt, John Baxter Taylor, Jr. (the first black athlete in America to win a Gold Medal in the Olympics), Nathaniel Cartmell, and seated, J.D. Whitham

Dr. Taylor was born in Washington D.C. to former slaves. The family settled in Philadelphia, Pennsylvania, where he attended public schools and graduated from Central High School in 1902. He spent a year at Brown Preparatory School, also in Philadelphia, where he was the fastest high school quarter-miler in the country. As a freshman at the Wharton School of Finance (Class of 1907) at University of Pennsylvania, he was the IC4A (Inter-Collegiate Association of Amateur Athletes of America) champion in the quarter mile. He bested his personal time in 1907, and again was the ICAAAA quarter mile champion. He transferred to and graduated from the University of Pennsylvania School of Veterinary Medicine (Class of 1908), and was a member of Sigma Pi Phi, the first black fraternity. He was recruited by the Irish American Athletic Club in New York, and was its most prominent African American member.

== 1908 Olympics ==
Taylor was a member of the gold medal-winning men's medley relay team at the 1908 Summer Olympics in London. He ran the third leg, performing the 400 meters. He followed William Hamilton and Nate Cartmell (fellow athletes from the University of Pennsylvania) and was followed by Mel Sheppard (a fellow athlete from Brown Preparatory School). In both the first round and the final, Taylor received a lead from Cartmell and passed one on to Sheppard. The team won both races, with times of 3:27.2 and 3:29.4. Taylor was the first African American to win an Olympic gold medal. His split for the final was 49.8 seconds.

He advanced to the finals in the men's 400 metres race at the 1908 Summer Olympics, winning his preliminary heat with a time of 50.8 seconds and his semifinal with 49.8 seconds. In the first running of the race, Taylor came in last place out of the four runners. However, teammate John Carpenter was disqualified after being accused of obstructing British runner Wyndham Halswelle and the race was ordered to be repeated without Carpenter. In protest at Carpenter's disqualification, Taylor and fellow American William Robbins refused to compete in the second final. Wyndham Halswelle ran the second final alone, with a time of 50 seconds, and was awarded the gold medal in the only walkover in Olympic history.

Less than five months after returning from the Olympic Games in London, Taylor died of typhoid fever on 2 December 1908 at the age of 26. He is interred at Eden Cemetery in Collingdale, Pennsylvania.

In his obituary, The New York Times called him "among the best quarter-milers in the world." In a letter to Taylor's parents, Harry Porter, fellow Irish American Athletic Club member and acting President of the 1908 U.S. Olympic Team wrote:

It is far more as the man (than the athlete) that John Taylor made his mark. Quite unostentatious, genial, (and) kindly, the fleet-footed, far-famed athlete was beloved wherever known...As a beacon of his race, his example of achievement in athletics, scholarship and manhood will never wane, if indeed it is not destined to form with that of Booker T. Washington.

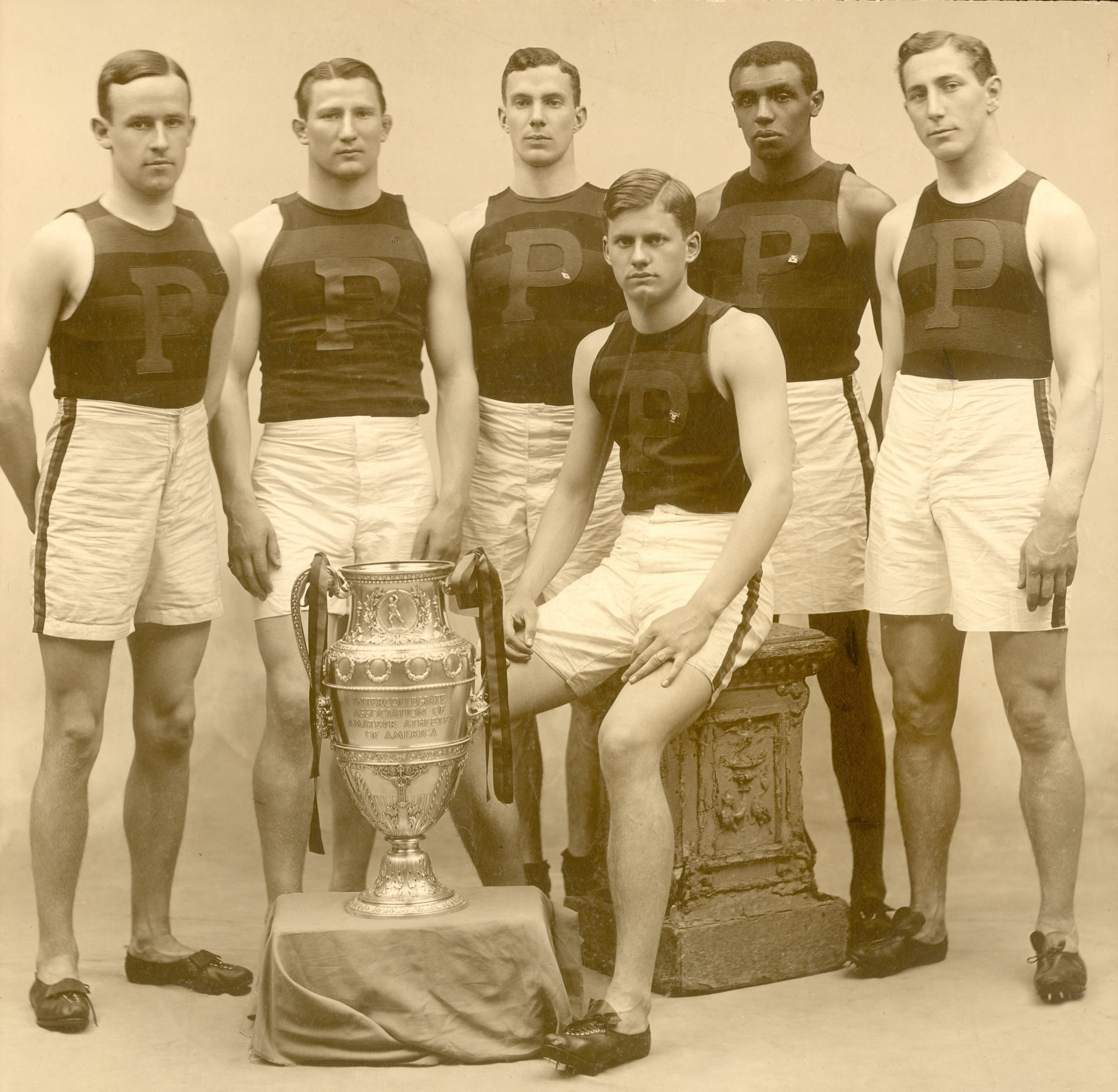
1907 University of Pennsylvania track team, with their ICAAAA trophy.

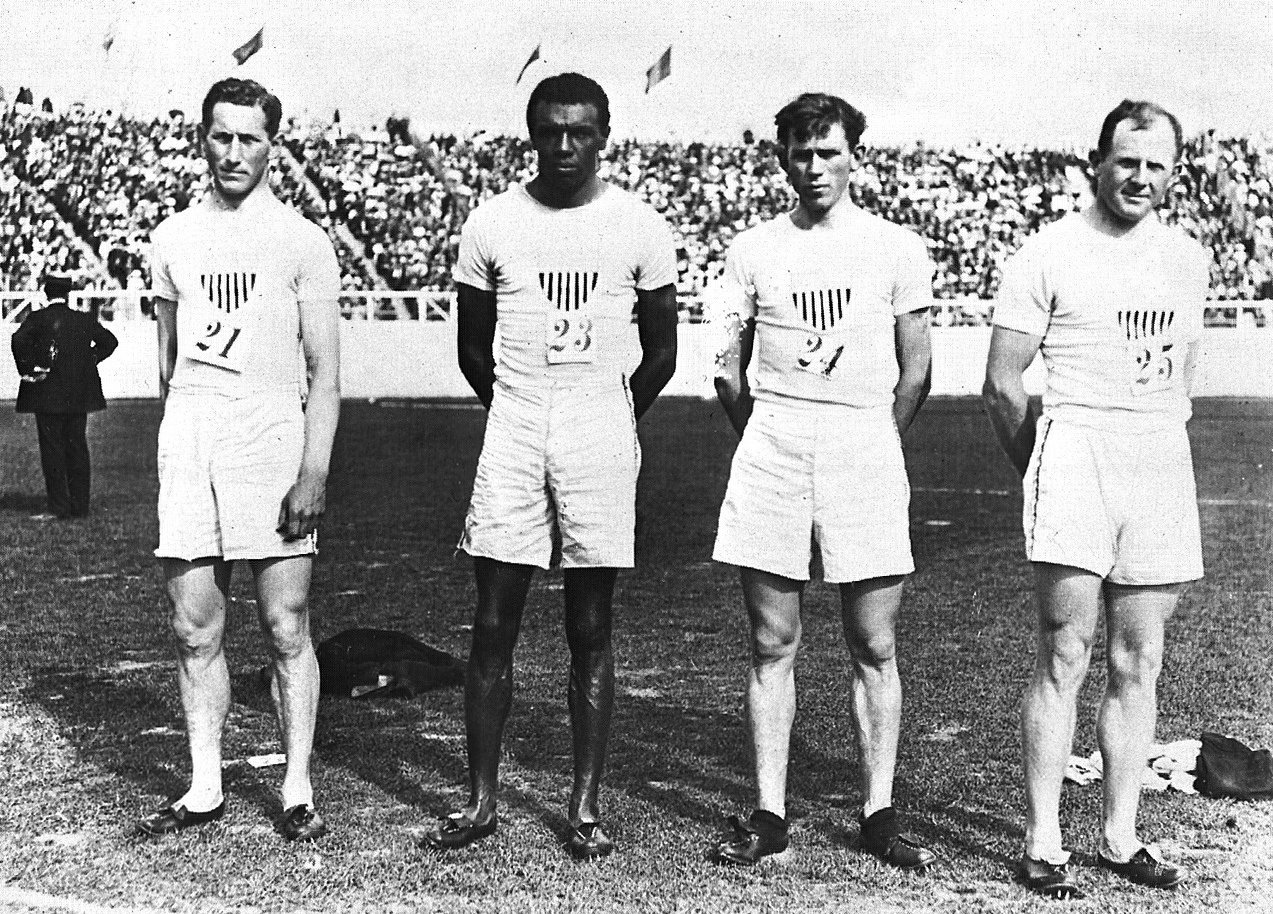
At the 1908 Olympic games.

John Baxter Taylor's death certificate.

== Notes ==
- Cook, Theodore Andrea (May 1909). The Fourth Olympiad London 1908 Official Report (PDF). London: British Olympic Association. Archived from the original (PDF) on 2007-09-27.
- De Wael, Herman (2001). "Athletics 1908". Herman's Full Olympians. Archived from the original on 27 September 2006.
- Greenberg, Stan (1987). Olympic Games: The Records. London: Guinness Books. ISBN 0-85112-896-3.
- Kieran, John (1977). The Story of the Olympic Games; 776 B.C. to 1976. Philadelphia and New York: J.B. Lippincott Company. ISBN 0-397-01168-7.
- Wudarski, Pawel (1999). "Wyniki Igrzysk Olimpijskich" (in Polish). Archived from the original on 16 February 2009.
- Williams, Craig (2010). The Olympian: An American Triumph. Bloomington, IN: iUniverse. ISBN 978-1-4502-6105-0.
