= Herbert Crowther =

British cyclist (1882–1916)

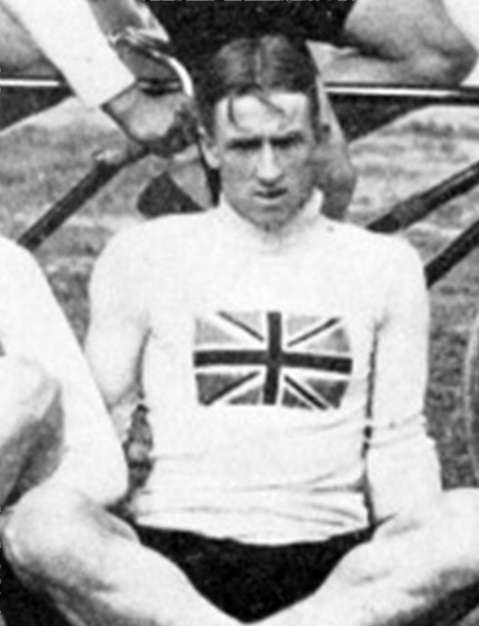
- Crowther at the 1906 Summer Olympics in Athens

Personal information
- Born: 28 October 1882 Dewsbury, England
- Died: 13 October 1916 (aged 33) Burley-in-Wharfedale, England

Cycling career
- Sport: Cycling
Medal record
Representing United Kingdom
Men's cycling
Olympic Games
Silver medal – second place	Athens 1906	Time Trial
Silver medal – second place	Athens 1906	5000 Metres

Herbert Crowther (28 October 1882 – 13 October 1916) was a British cyclist. He won two silver medals at the 1906 Intercalated Games and competed in one event at the 1908 Summer Olympics.

Crowther died in 1916, from a skull fracture he sustained two years earlier after crashing his motorcycle into a horse-drawn coach in Lancashire.
