= John McGough (athlete) =

Scottish athlete (1881–1967)

Personal information
- Born: 20 January 1881 Armagh, Northern Ireland
- Died: 23 April 1967 (aged 86) Castleblayney, County Monaghan, Ireland

Sport
- Sport: Athletics
- Event: middle-distance
- Club: Bellahouston Harriers

John McGough (20 January 1881 – 23 April 1967) was a Scottish/Irish athlete. He competed at the 1908 Summer Olympics in London.

== Biography ==
Born in Armagh, Ireland, John McGough moved to Scotland when only six months old and became the leading Scottish middle-distance runner in the early years of the century. Living and working as a postman in the famous Gorbals district of Glasgow, he joined the Bellahouston Harriers and won their 1900 cross-country title. At one time, he held every Scottish record from 1000y to 4 miles. He won a total of 12 Scottish AAA titles: 880y (1903–04, 1907), mile (1902–07, 1910), and 4 miles (1902–03). At Ibrox Stadium on 20 June 1903, McGough won the half-mile, mile and 4-miles titles all in the same afternoon. He was also the Irish AAA champion at both 2 and 3 miles in 1905 and at one mile in 1907.

McGough finished as runner-up in the mile event at three successive AAA Championships from 1904 to 1906. At the 1904 AAA Championships he finished runner-up behind Alfred Shrubb and then in 1905 and 1906 was beaten by George Butterfield.

The mile was undoubtedly his best distance, and he won a silver medal in the 1500 metres at the 1906 Intercalated Games. His journey to Athens for the Games was not a pleasant one as he suffered sea sickness during part of the trip.

At the 1908 Summer Olympics, he competed in the 1500 metres. McGough placed third in his initial semi-final heat and did not advance to the final. His time was 4:16.4. He also suffered in the 1500 metres with a bandaged ankle and missed the final after finishing third in his heat.

Between 1901 and 1911, McGough averaged more than 20 wins per year, and it is said that no Scottish runner won more handicap races off scratch than he did. In his younger days, McGough helped out Glasgow Celtic FC as a masseur in the winter months and, after his retirement from athletics in 1910, was appointed the assistant manager to Bob Davies at Celtic. When Davies took over at Manchester City FC, McGough moved with him and stayed until the outbreak of the war when he returned to his native Ireland and became a farmer. He also showed a great interest in Gaelic Football back in his home country and, in 1915, was a founder member of the Blackhill Emeralds GAA team; as a trainer, he helped Monaghan Juniors to win the Ulster title in 1939, 1940, and 1945. In 1947, he was one of the trainers of the Cavan team, which beat Kerry in the GAA All-Ireland final at the Polo Grounds, New York.

== Personal bests ==
800 – 1:57.6 (1906); 1000y – 2:18.2 (1905); 1500 – 4:12.6e (1906); Mile – 4:19.2 (1906); 2 miles – 9:32.4 (1904); 3 miles – 14:44.6 (1904); 4 miles – 20:06.2 (1905).

== Sources ==
- Cook, Theodore Andrea (1908). The Fourth Olympiad, Being the Official Report. London: British Olympic Association.
- De Wael, Herman (2001). "Athletics 1908". Herman's Full Olympians. Archived from the original on 27 September 2006.
- Wudarski, Pawel (1999). "Wyniki Igrzysk Olimpijskich" (in Polish). Archived from the original on 16 February 2009.
- John McGough at World Athletics
- John McGough at Olympedia
