= Gerald Merlin =

British sports shooter

Personal information
- Born: 3 August 1884 Athens, Greece
- Died: 7 April 1945 (aged 60) India

Sport
- Sport: Sports shooting
Medal record
Men's shooting
Representing United Kingdom
Intercalated Games
Gold medal – first place	1906 Athens	Trap, single shot
Bronze medal – third place	1906 Athens	Trap, double shot

Gerald Merlin (3 August 1884 – 7 April 1945) was a British sports shooter. He competed at the 1906 Intercalated Games and the 1908 Summer Olympics. At the 1906 Intercalated Games, he won a gold and a bronze medal.
