= Arthur Rushen =

British cyclist

Personal information
- Full name: Arthur Rushen
- Born: 10 June 1884
- Died: 1968 (aged 83–84)

Cycling career
- Sport: Cycling
Medal record
Representing United Kingdom
Men's cycling
Olympic Games
Gold medal – first place	Athens 1906	2000m tandem

Arthur Rushen (10 June 1884 – 1968) was a British cyclist. He won a gold medal at the 1906 Intercalated Games and competed in one event at the 1908 Summer Olympics.
