= Bellahouston Harriers =

Scottish athletics club

- Founded: August 1892
- Ground: Hutchesons', Pollok Country Park; Hutchesons' Grammar School
- Location: 97 Haggs Road, Bellahouston, Glasgow G41 4AL
- Coordinates: 55.833501°N 4.296676°W
- Website: official website

Bellahouston Harriers is a Scottish athletics club based in Glasgow, Scotland and is affiliated to Scottish Athletics. The club is based at Hutchesons' in Pollok Country Park on Haggs Road and at the athletics track at Hutchesons' Grammar School. The club specialises in road races and cross country events, with training held on Tuesdays and Thursdays.

== History ==
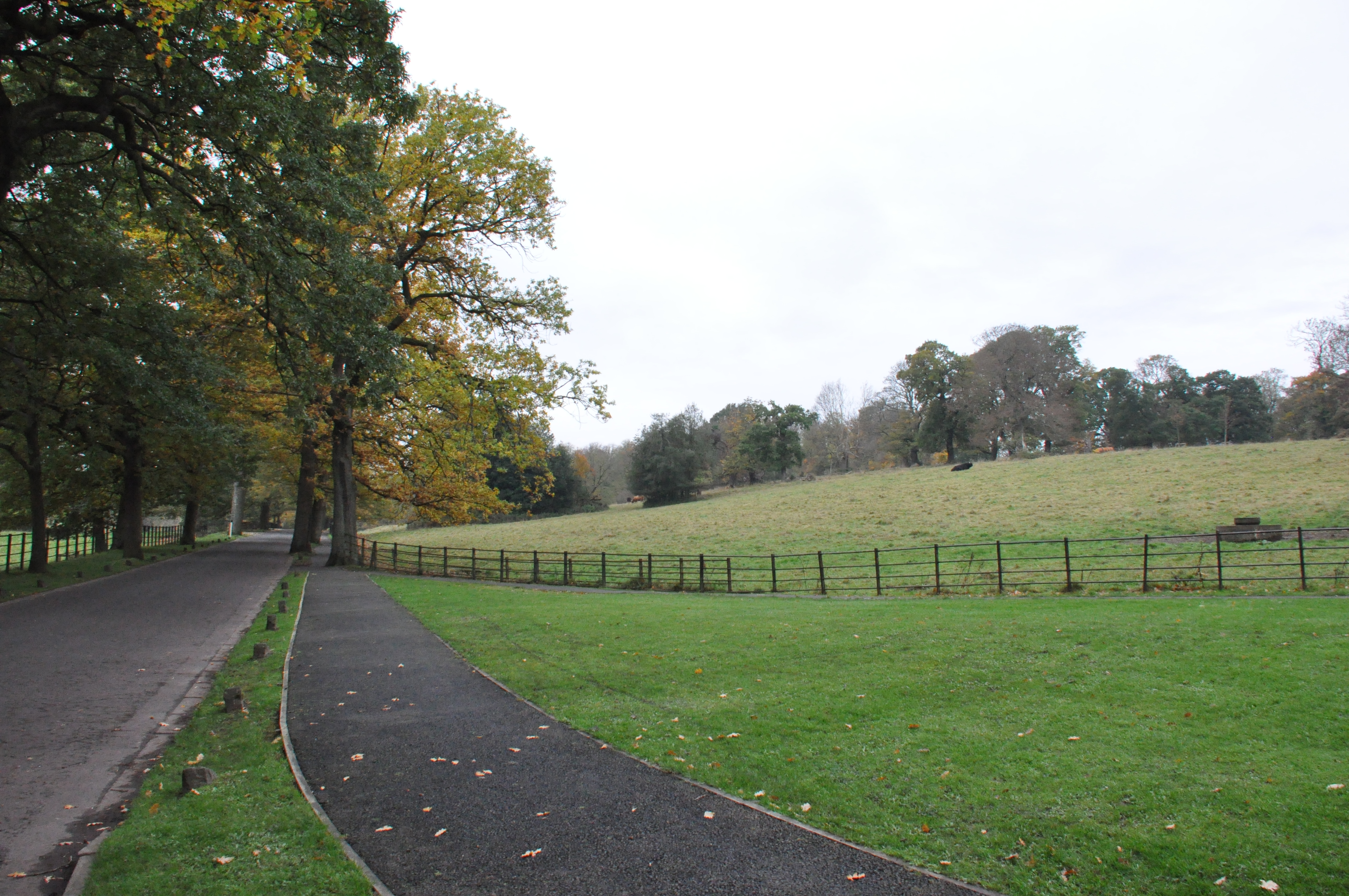
Pollok County Park

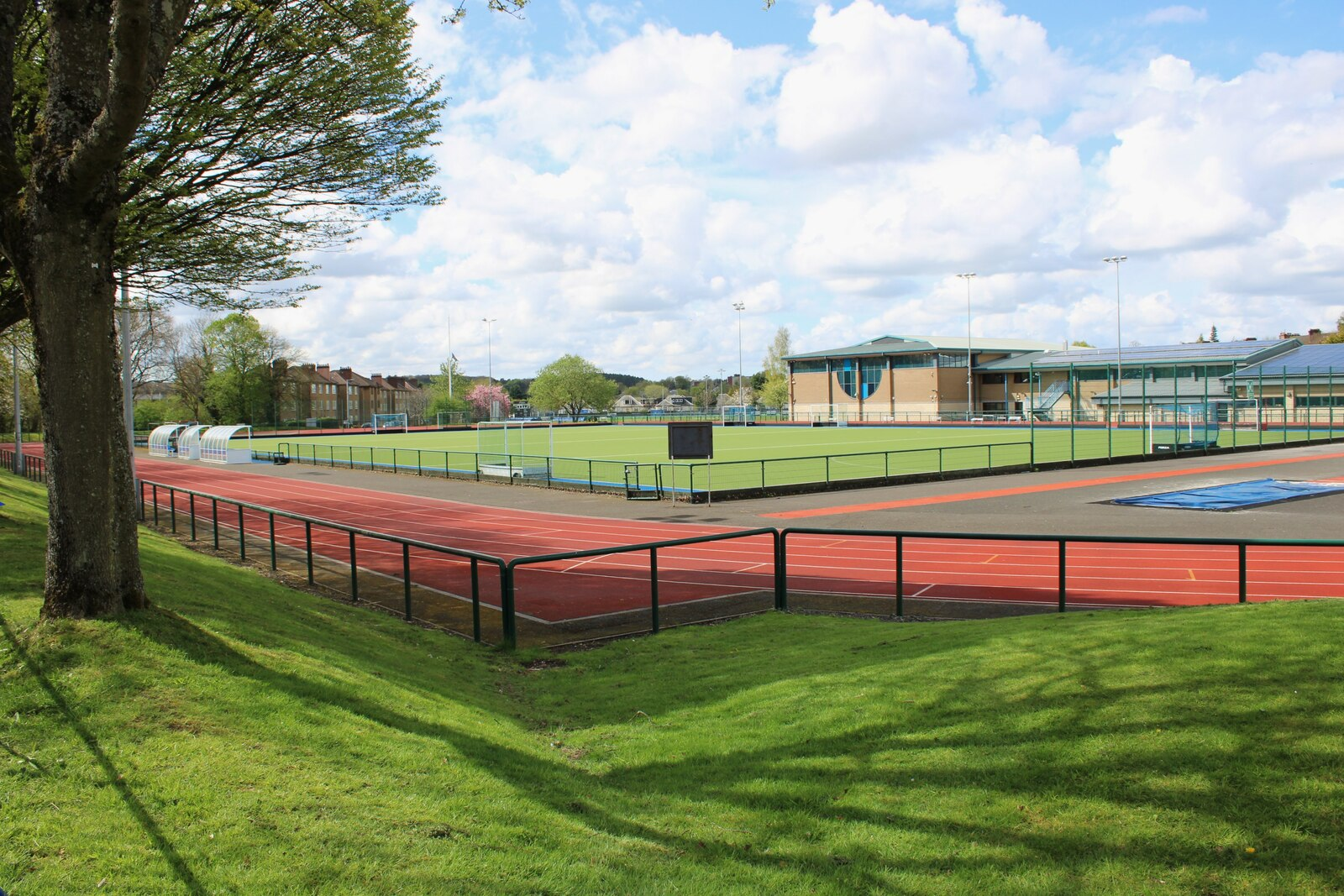
the track at Hutchesons' Grammar School

The club was founded in August 1892, with the first president being Alexander Donald and vice-president W. Campbell.

The club's first Olympian was William Anderson in the 400 and 800 metres events at the 1906 Olympics or 1906 Intercalated Games in Athens.

== Notable athletes ==
=== Olympians ===
| Athlete | Events | Games | Medals/Ref |
|---|---|---|---|
| William Anderson | 400m, 800m | 1906 | |
| John McGough | 800, 1500m, 5 miles | 1906, 1908 | |
| Tom Kirkwood | Shot put (non starter) | 1908 | |
| Richard Quinn | 3,500m walk | 1908 | |
| George Young | 400m | 1960 | |
| Frank Clement | 800, 1500m | 1960 | |

- Scottish unless stated

=== Commonwealth Games ===
| Athlete | Events | Games | Medals/Ref |
|---|---|---|---|
| Joe Connolly | 3/6 miles | 1958 | |
| Harry Fenion | marathon | 1958 | |
| Graham Fleck | 220 yards | 1958 | |
| Mary Symon | 100y, 4×110 relay | 1958 | |
