= George Young (British athlete) =

British athlete

Personal information
- Nationality: British
- Born: 19 April 1885 Fulham, London, England
- Died: 2 June 1952 (aged 67) Adelaide, Australia

Sport
- Sport: Athletics
- Event: 400m/440y
- Club: Bellahouston Harriers

George William Young (19 April 1885 – 2 June 1952) was a British track and field athlete who competed at the 1908 Summer Olympics.

== Biography ==
Young, although born in London, competed for the Bellahouston Harriers in Glasgow. He participatedin the Scottish AAA Championships, finishing third in the 440 yards event in 1908 and a year later finished runner-up in the 220 yards and third in the 440 yards.

Young represented Great Britain at the 1908 Summer Olympics in London. In the 400 metres, Young won his preliminary heat with a time of 52.4 seconds. He advanced to the semifinals, where he finished fourth in his four-man heat and did not advance to the final.

He served as a lieutenant with the Australian Division during World War I.

== Sources ==
- Cook, Theodore Andrea (1908). The Fourth Olympiad, Being the Official Report. London: British Olympic Association.
- De Wael, Herman (2001). "Athletics 1908". Herman's Full Olympians. Archived from the original on 27 September 2006.
- Wudarski, Pawel (1999). "Wyniki Igrzysk Olimpijskich" (in Polish). Archived from the original on 16 February 2009.
