= William Pett =

British cyclist

Personal information
- Born: 25 August 1873 Derby, England
- Died: 28 December 1954 (aged 81) Ewell, Surrey, England

Cycling career
- Sport: Cycling
Medal record
Representing United Kingdom
Men's cycling
Olympic Games
Gold medal – first place	Athens 1906	20km

William Pett (25 August 1873 – 28 December 1954) was a British cyclist. He won a gold medal at the 1906 Intercalated Games and competed in one event at the 1908 Summer Olympics.
