= William Anderson (athlete) =

Irish athlete

Personal information
- Nationality: Irish
- Born: William Davidson Anderson; 14 April 1878 Ireland
- Died: 25 January 1958 (aged 79) Windsor, Ontario

Sport
- Sport: Athletics
- Event(s): Men's 400 metres Men's 800 metres
- Club: Bellahouston Harriers

William Davidson Anderson (14 April 1878 – 25 January 1958) was an Irish athlete. He competed for Great Britain in two events at the 1906 Intercalated Games.

== Personal life ==
Born in Ireland, Anderson moved to Scotland with his family when he was six months old. He moved to Saskatchewan prior to World War I, during which he served as a private in the 5th Battalion, Canadian Expeditionary Force.
