= Maurice Bardonneau =

French cyclist (1885–1958)

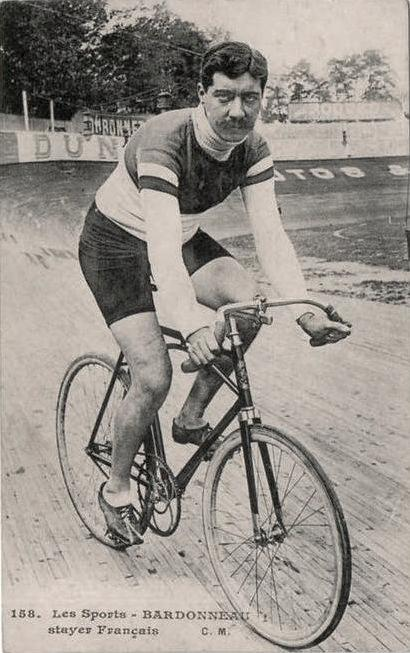

Personal information
- Born: 22 May 1885 Saint-Maurice, Val-de-Marne, France
- Died: 3 July 1958 (aged 73) Issy-les-Moulineaux, France

Sport
- Sport: Cycling
- Club: Association Vélocipédique d'Amateurs
Medal record
Representing France
Olympic Games
Silver medal – second place	1906 Athens	Road race
Silver medal – second place	1906 Athens	20 km
UCI Motor-paced World Championships
Gold medal – first place	1906 Geneva	Amateurs

Maurice Charles Adolphe Bardonneau (22 May 1885 – 3 July 1958) was a French cyclist. He competed at the 1906 Summer Olympics (Intercalated Games) in the 5 km, 20 km and road race and won two silver medals in the last two events. In the same year he also won the UCI Motor-paced World Championships and the first stage of the Paris–Brussels road race.
