= John Carpenter (athlete) =

American sprinter (1884–1933)

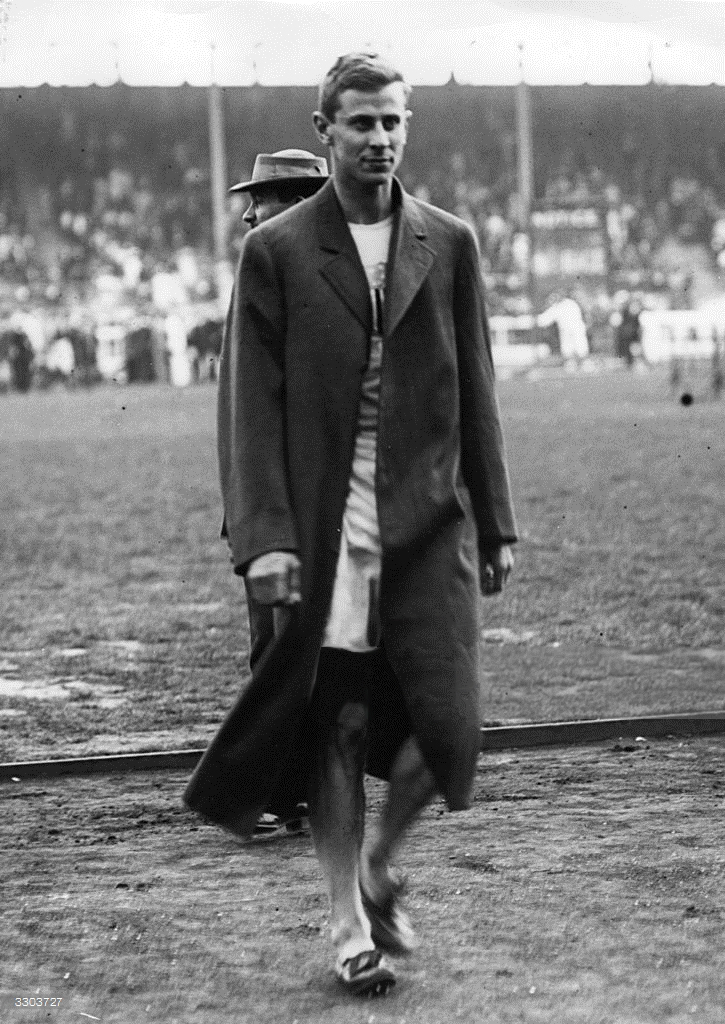
- John Carpenter, 1908 Olympic Games

Personal information
- Nationality: American
- Born: John Condict Carpenter; December 7, 1884 Washington, DC
- Died: June 4, 1933 (aged 48)
- Spouse: Laura Helen Carpenter (née Elliott)

Sport
- Sport: Track
- Event: 400 meters
- College team: Cornell
- Retired: 1908
Medal record
Representing United States
Olympic Games
| Disqualified | 1908 London | 400 metres |

John Condict Carpenter (December 7, 1884 – June 4, 1933) was an American sprinter. He competed at the 1908 Summer Olympics in London, contributing to one of the many sporting controversies of the 1908 Games.

== Early life ==
John Carpenter was born in Washington, DC, in 1884, the oldest child of noted travel writer Frank G. Carpenter and Joanna Carpenter (née Condict), and the brother of future author and folklorist Frances Carpenter. Carpenter traveled widely in his family's company throughout his childhood before matriculating at Cornell University, from which he graduated in 1907. Carpenter placed third in the 1908 collegiate national track and field championship, 440 yards while running for Cornell.

== Participation in the 1908 London Olympics ==
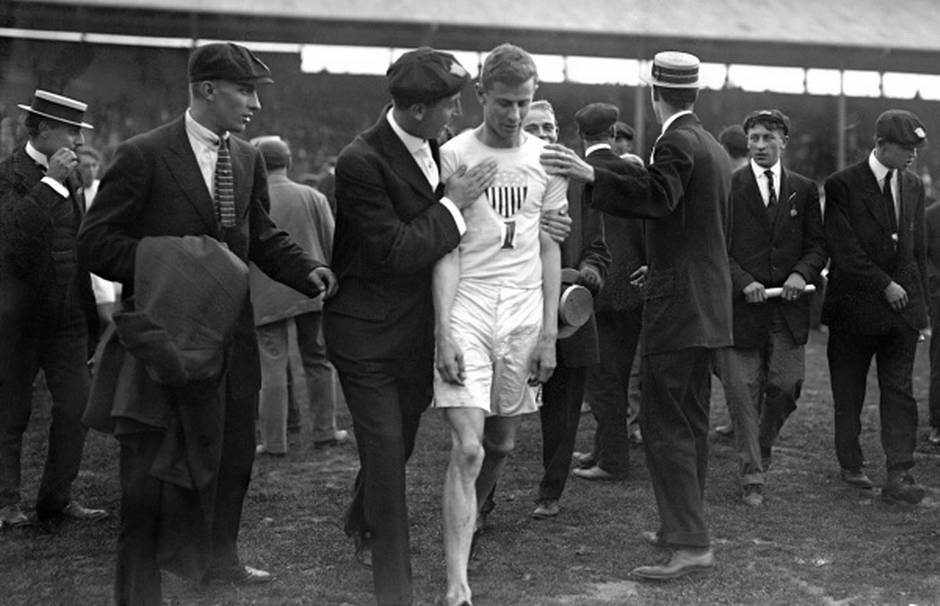
Carpenter learning of his disqualification, 1908 Olympic Games

He advanced to the finals in the men's 400 meters race at the 1908 Summer Olympics after winning his preliminary heat with a time of 49.8 seconds and his semifinal in 49.4 seconds. In the first running of the final race, Carpenter came in first out of the four runners, clocking 47.8 seconds. However, umpire Roscoe Badger determined that Carpenter had willfully interfered with British runner Wyndham Halswelle. Though the obstructing maneuver was then legal under American rules, the Olympic contests were held under British rules, which did not allow it. Carpenter was disqualified, and the race was ordered to be repeated without him. His countrymen, John Taylor and William Robbins, protested the ruling by boycotting the second final, leaving Halswelle to take the gold medal uncontested in the only walkover in the modern Olympic history.

== Legacy and death ==
The disputed race was instrumental in the formation of the International Amateur Athletic Federation before the next Olympics, which sought to standardize the rules by which various sports played around the world. Additional reforms inspired by the dispute included a shift from the host country's providing judges to judges' being allocated from an international pool. As for the 400 meter sprint, following 1908, lanes were introduced to reduce incidents of runner-interference.

Carpenter dropped racing after 1908 and became a patent attorney and investment broker in Chicago. He married Laura Helen Elliott and had three children: Frank George Carpenter, Marion Frances Carpenter, and John Elliot Carpenter. He was hit and killed by a train in 1933.

== Sources ==
- Cook, Theodore Andrea (1908). The Fourth Olympiad, Being the Official Report. London: British Olympic Association.
- De Wael, Herman (2001). "Athletics 1908". Herman's Full Olympians. Archived from the original on September 27, 2006.
- Wudarski, Pawel (1999). "Wyniki Igrzysk Olimpijskich" (in Polish). Archived from the original on February 16, 2009.
- "Family takes pride in Olympic disqualification". The Dallas News (August 2, 2012).
