= Melville Clark =

British diver

Personal information
- Born: 30 August 1882 Hampstead, England
- Died: 21 February 1950 (aged 67) Marylebone, England

Sport
- Country: Great Britain
- Sport: Diving

Gordon Melville Clark (30 August 1882 – 21 February 1950) was a British diver who competed at the 1906 Intercalated Games in Athens, Greece.

Melville was the British Amateur Diving Champion in 1904 and 1905, he was selected for the 1906 Intercalated Games and competed in the platform event, where each diver had nine dives three from three different heights, at the end Clark was judged to have finished fifth overall, just 3.4 points behind the bronze medal position.

There is a G Melville Clark National Memorial Trophy held annually by the Amateur Swimming Association for team diving.
