= John Atlee (athlete) =

American athlete

John Cox Atlee (October 30, 1882 – August 2, 1958) was an American athlete. He competed at the 1908 Summer Olympics in London.

In the 400 meters, Atlee won his preliminary heat with a time of 50.4 seconds to advance to the semifinals. There, he finished third and last in his heat and did not move on to the final.

== Sources ==
- Cook, Theodore Andrea (1908). The Fourth Olympiad, Being the Official Report. London: British Olympic Association.
- De Wael, Herman (2001). "Athletics 1908". Herman's Full Olympians. Archived from the original on 27 September 2006.
- Wudarski, Pawel (1999). "Wyniki Igrzysk Olimpijskich" (in Polish). Archived from the original on 16 February 2009.
