= Keeley Halswelle =

English painter

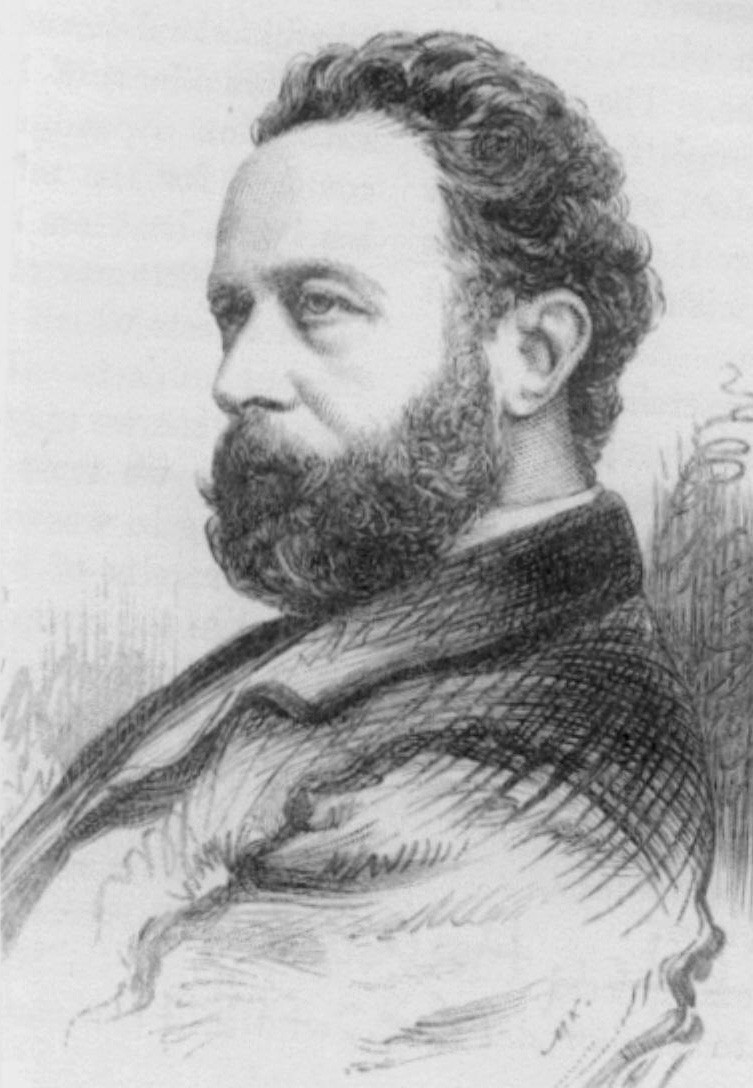
- Halswelle in an 1881 illustration
- Born: John Keeley Haswell; April 23, 1831; Richmond, London, U.K.
- Died: April 11, 1891 (aged 59); Paris, France
- Burial place: Steep, Hampshire, England
- Occupation: Artist
- Spouses: Mary Jane Blackwood Gilbert (1852-1854); Maria Browne (1861-1873); Helen Gordon (1873-?)
- Children: 2, including Wyndham

Signature
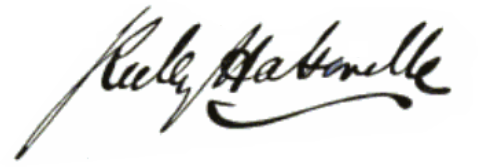

Keeley Halswelle (1831–1891), born John Keeley Haswell, was an English artist.

== Life ==
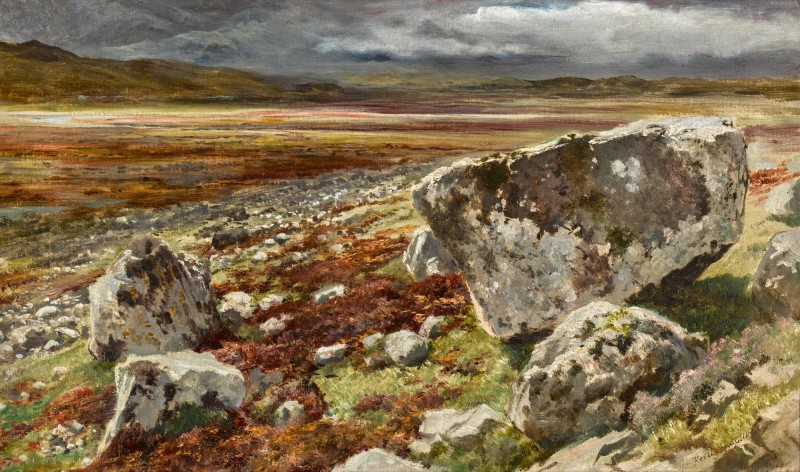
Painting of Glen Sligachan, Skye, by Keeley Halswelle

Keeley Halswelle was born John Keeley Haswell, son of David and Elizabeth Haswell, at Richmond, Surrey on 23 April 1831 and baptized 6 July 1831 at St. Dionis Blackchurch, London. At an early age he contributed drawings to the Illustrated London News, and took up book illustration. Work for the Illustrated Shakespeare of Robert Chambers took him to Edinburgh, where he found a good friend in William Nelson, the publisher. In 1863 he is listed as living at Bellfield House in Duddingston Village on the southern outskirts of Edinburgh.

In 1869 Halswelle left Britain for Italy, and during the next few years concentrated on subjects found there. He was elected a member of the Institute of Painters in Oil Colours in 1882.

Halswelle lived his later years at Stoner House, Steep, near Petersfield in Hampshire, where he was a ruling councillor of the Primrose League. He died of pneumonia in Paris on 11 April 1891, and was buried at Steep on 20 April.

== Works ==
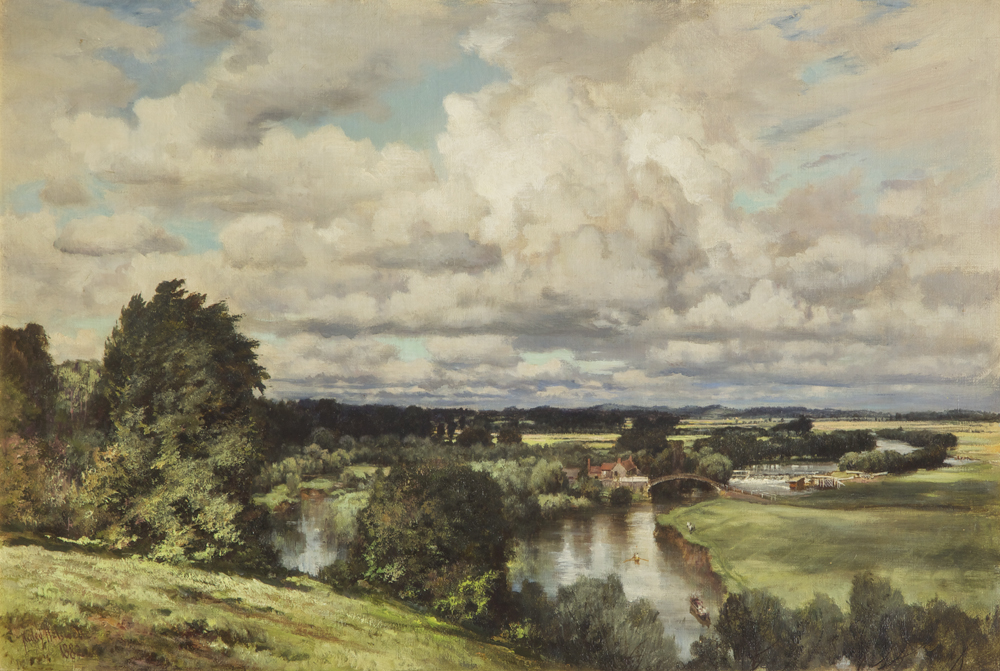
Valley of the Thames, 1882 landscape by Keeley Halswelle

Among the books which Halswelle illustrated were:

- The Falls of Clyde, 1859;
- Byron's Poems, 1861;
- Scott's Poems, 1861;
- Thomas Morris's Poems, 1863;
- Wordsworth's Poems, 1863; and
- The Knight of the Silver Shield, 1885.

In 1857 a painting of his was exhibited at the Royal Scottish Academy, and in 1866 Halswelle was elected associate. The Roba di Roma, exhibited at Burlington House, gained a prize at Manchester; but the popular work of this period was Non Angli sed Angeli, painted in 1877, which was exhibited at the Royal Scottish Academy in 1878.

Halswelle in later life added to his reputation, as a landscapist. A painting in oil of the River Thames above Maidenhead was included in Henry Tate's gift to the nation, and went to the Millbank Gallery. In 1884 some of his views of the Thames, Six Years in a Houseboat, were shown in London; and he wrote a book under the same title.

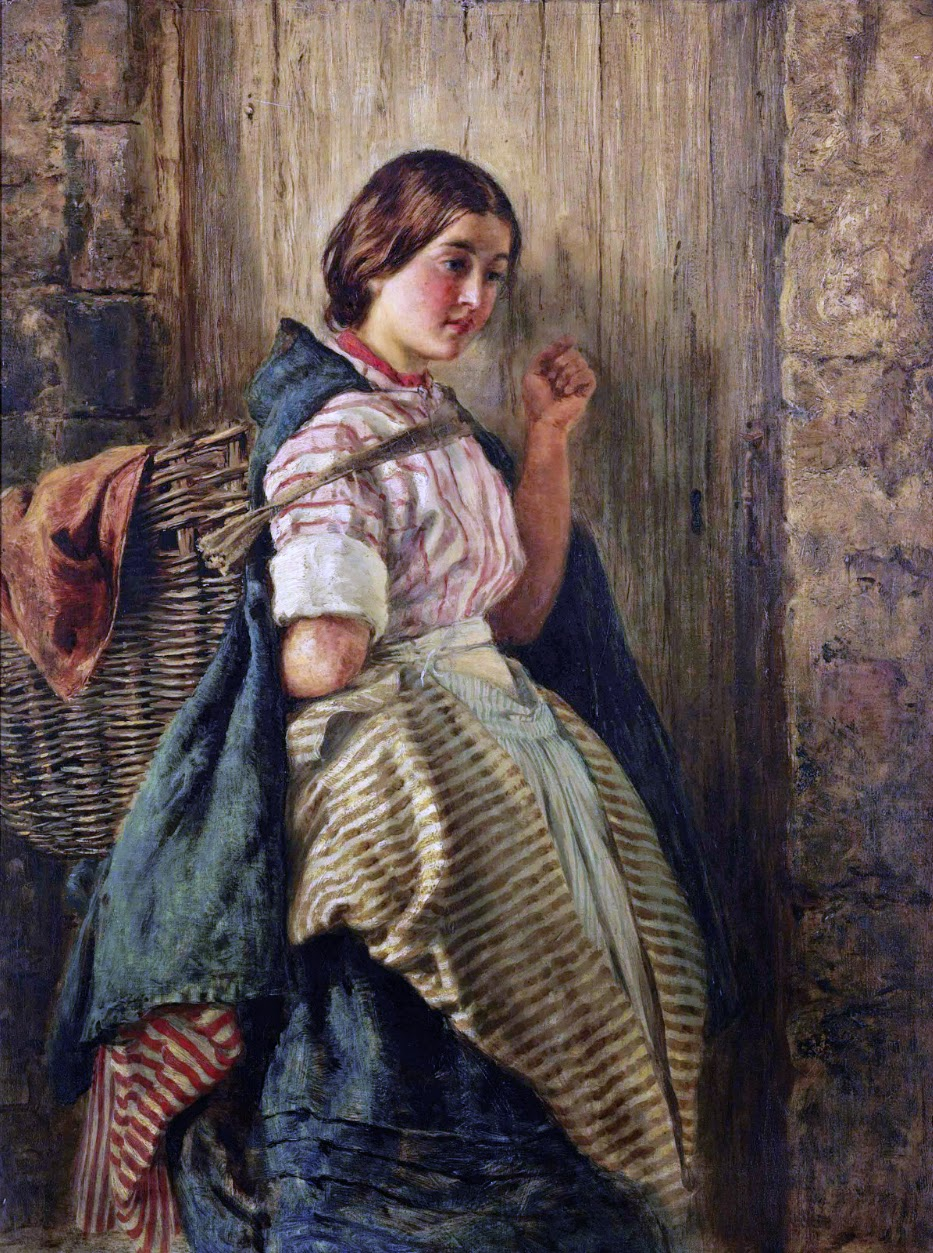
A Newhaven Fish-Lassie (1864), by Keeley Halswelle

== Family ==
Halswelle first married clandestinely on 25 May 1852 at the Independent Chapel, Bethnal Green, to Mary Jane Blackwood Gilbert, but they never lived together and Halswelle broke off contact the following November due to her infidelity and left London for Scotland in 1854. In 1859 he successfully petitioned for divorce. He next married at Edinburgh, 18 June 1861, to Maria Browne, daughter of the advocate James Browne, and Isabella Stewart. Following her death, in 1873 he married Helen, daughter of Major-General N. J. Gordon, who survived him with two sons, Major Gordon Halswelle (1874–1935) and Wyndham Halswelle.

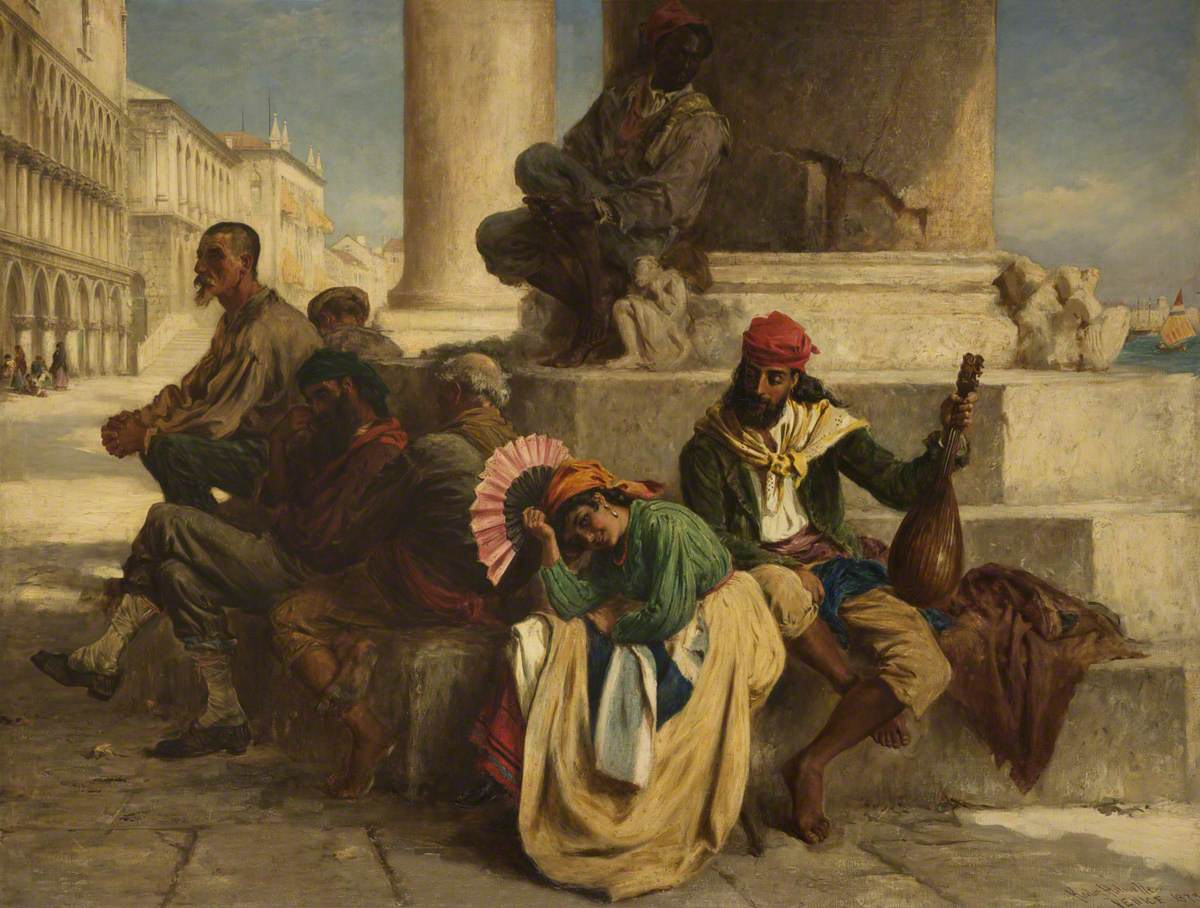
Under the Lion of St. Mark's, by Keeley Halswelle
