= Wyndham Halswelle =

British athlete and soldier (1882–1915)

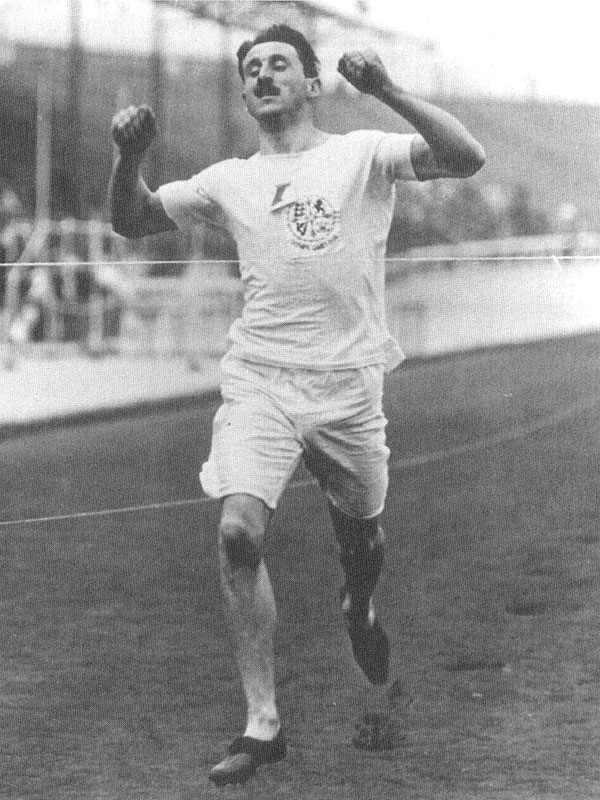
- Halswelle in 1908
- Born: 30 May 1882; London, England
- Died: 31 March 1915 (aged 32); Artois, France
- Burial place: Royal Irish Rifles Graveyard, Laventie
- Education: Charterhouse School; Royal Military College, Sandhurst
- Occupation: Athlete
- Father: Keeley Halswelle
- Sports career
- Club: Edinburgh Harriers
Medal record
Men's athletics
Representing United Kingdom
Intercalated Games
Silver medal – second place	1906 Athens	400 metres
Bronze medal – third place	1906 Athens	800 metres
Olympic Games
Gold medal – first place	1908 London	400 metres

Wyndham Halswelle (30 May 1882 – 31 March 1915) was a British athlete. He won the controversial 400 m race at the 1908 Summer Olympics, becoming the only athlete to win an Olympic title by a walkover.

Halswelle was also an infantry officer who served in the Second Boer War and World War I. He was killed by a sniper at the Battle of Neuve Chapelle in 1915.

== Early life ==
Born in London to London-born, Edinburgh-trained artist Keeley Halswelle and Helen Marianna Elizabeth Gordon, he is nonetheless usually referred to as being Scottish, the nationality of his maternal grandfather, General Nathaniel J. Gordon. Wyndham Halswelle had a notable athletic career at Charterhouse School and the Royal Military College, Sandhurst, before being commissioned into the Highland Light Infantry as a second lieutenant on 8 January 1901. Serving in South Africa in 1902 for the Second Boer War, Halswelle's ability was recognised by Jimmy Curran, a coach and amateur athlete. Halswelle returned to his regiment in January 1903, and was with the 1st battalion as they left South Africa for Egypt the same month. It was Curran who persuaded Halswelle to take up athletics seriously when his regiment returned to Edinburgh in 1904.

== Domestic athletics ==
In 1904 he was army champion for 880 yards, and in 1905 he won the Scottish and AAA 440 yard (402 m) titles. In the 1906 Athens Intercalated Olympics, he achieved a silver medal in the 400 metres and a bronze in the 800 metres. On his return, in a single afternoon in 1906 at the Scottish championships in Powderhall, he won the 100, 220, 440 and 880 yards races (91, 201, 402, 805 m), a feat that has not been matched since. His season was cut short by a leg injury in 1907, but he came back the following year to set a world record of 31.2 s for 300 yards (274 m) and a British record over 440 yards of 48.4 s that lasted over a quarter of a century until it was eventually broken by Godfrey Rampling. In 1908 he set a Scottish 300 yards record that lasted until 1961 when it was beaten by Menzies Campbell, then a Glasgow University student.

== 1908 Summer Olympics ==
In 1908 Summer Olympics, Halswelle reached the final of the 400 m with the fastest qualifying time (an Olympic record of 48.4 s). The 400 m was not run in lanes at this point. Halswelle was baulked by William Robbins in the first 50 m. Then, coming off the final bend, Robbins led John Carpenter by a yard, with Halswelle waiting to pass him in the last straight, as he had done to other athletes in the earlier rounds. Carpenter ran wide, forcing Halswelle to within eighteen inches of the outside of the track, using his right elbow to prevent Halswelle overtaking. British umpire Roscoe Badger observed that Carpenter manoeuvred so as to prevent Halswelle from passing him. While blocking competitors was an acceptable strategy in the United States, it was prohibited by the British rules under which the 1908 London Olympics were organised. Badger immediately signalled the judges to declare the race void. Pictures of the race indicate that Carpenter (intentionally or not) blocked Halswelle.

Carpenter was disqualified, and the race was ordered to be rerun in lanes two days later; however, the other two U.S. runners refused to race, so a reluctant Halswelle ran the race by himself to win the gold in a time of 50.2 s. It is the only occasion in Olympic history where the final was a walkover. As a result of the controversy, from the next Olympics in 1912 onwards all 400 metre races were run in lanes, and the International Amateur Athletic Federation was founded to establish uniform worldwide rules for athletics.

The controversy soured Halswelle's view of athletics. He was also under pressure from his senior officers, who felt he was being exploited, and he retired from athletics after a farewell appearance at the 1908 Glasgow Rangers Sports.

== Death ==
Halswelle, by then a captain, was killed by a sniper at the Battle of Neuve Chapelle in France, during World War I, on 31 March 1915 aged 32 while attempting to rescue an injured fellow officer. Earlier in the same battle (12 March) he was hit by shrapnel or shell fragments while leading his men across an area known as Layes Brook but despite his wounds he refused to be evacuated and continued at the front, although heavily bandaged.

In the issue of the HLI regimental magazine that announced his death also appeared a piece he wrote days before it. It described a battle where 79 of his fellow soldiers died to gain 15 yards:

"I called on the men to get over the parapet... There is great difficulty in getting out of a trench, especially for small men laden with a pack, rifle and perhaps 50 rounds in the pouch, and a bandolier of 50 rounds hung around them, and perhaps four feet of slippery clay perpendicular wall with sandbags on the top. I got about three men hit actually on top of the parapet. I made a dash at the parapet and fell back. The Jocks then heaved me up and I jumped into a ditch – an old trench filled with liquid mud – which took me some time to get out of."

His grave was marked with a wooden cross, with his name in charcoal. Later his remains were re-interred in the Royal Irish Rifles Graveyard at Laventie, near Armentières.

In 2003, he was posthumously inducted into the Scottish Sports Hall of Fame. His Olympic medals and other trophies are displayed there.

Halswelle's regiment, now the Royal Highland Fusiliers, awards the Wyndham Halswelle Memorial Trophy to the winner of the 400 m at the Scottish under-20 championships.

== See also ==
- List of Olympians killed in World War I
