= 1908 Summer Olympics =

Multi-sport event held in London, England

Games of the IV Olympiad
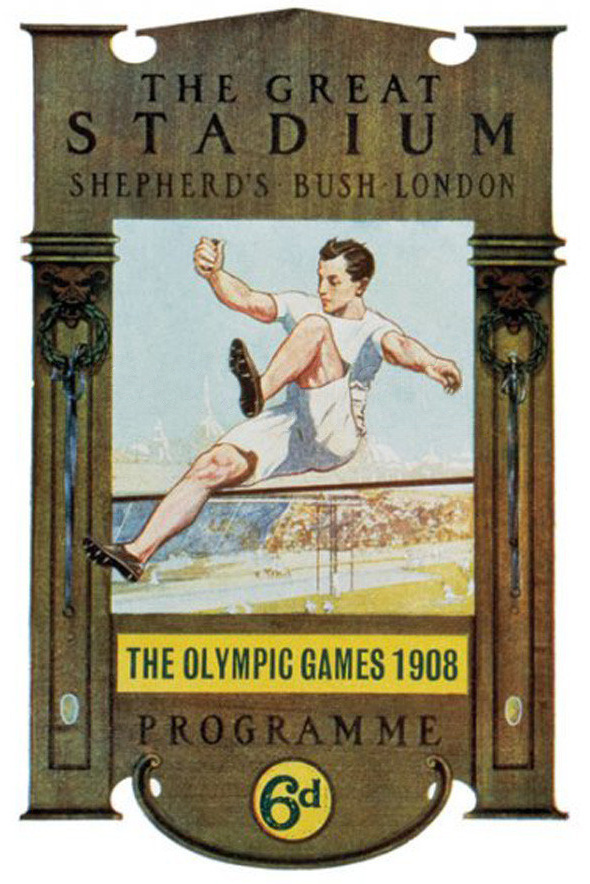
- Programme for the 1908 Summer Olympics
- Location: London, United Kingdom
- Nations: 22
- Athletes: 2,008 (1,971 men, 37 women)
- Events: 110 in 22 sports (25 disciplines)
- Opening: 27 April 1908
- Closing: 31 October 1908
- Opened by: King Edward VII
- Stadium: White City Stadium

The 1908 Summer Olympics (officially the Games of the IV Olympiad and also known as London 1908) were an international multi-sport event held in London, United Kingdom, from 27 April to 31 October 1908.

The 1908 Games were relocated to London after Italy withdrew from hosting on financial grounds. Rome had been awarded the games at the 6th IOC Session in 1904, but Italy formally relinquished its obligation during the 8th IOC Session at the Intercalated Games in Athens in April 1906, with Italy's IOC member Count Eugenio Brunetta d'Usseaux citing the financial consequences of the eruption of Mount Vesuvius (4–22 April 1906) as the reason. Mallon and Buchanan cite personal communications from Italian Olympic historian Giuseppe Odello, suggesting that the decision to withdraw had effectively been made before the eruption, claiming that Prime Minister Giovanni Giolitti had already withheld the government funds necessary to finance the games, which were competing with major public works projects including the Simplon Tunnel, an aqueduct in the Puglia region, relief efforts following the Calabrian earthquake of 1905, and expenditure planned for the celebrations of the 50th anniversary of Rome as capital. Archival research has established that the British Olympic Association was already privately exploring the possibility of London hosting the games as early as 5 January 1906, three months before the eruption began. London was formally confirmed as host on 19 November 1906. Rome eventually hosted the games in 1960.

These were the fourth chronological modern Summer Olympics in keeping with the now-accepted four-year cycle as opposed to the alternate four-year cycle of the proposed Intercalated Games. The IOC president for these games was Baron Pierre de Coubertin.

Lasting a total of 187 days (six months and four days), these were the longest games in modern Olympics history.

== Background ==
There were four bids for the 1908 Summer Olympics. Rome was selected ahead of London, Berlin and Milan. The selection was made at the 6th IOC Session in London in 1904.

Italian authorities were preparing to stage the games when Mount Vesuvius erupted on 7 April 1906, devastating the city of Naples. Funds were diverted to the reconstruction of Naples, so a new host country was required. During the Intercalated Games of Athens, still in April 1906, Coubertin approached Lord Desborough about alternatively hosting in London. Accepting the offer and with a mere 18 months in which to prepare, London was selected for the first time to hold the games, which were held at White City alongside the Franco-British Exhibition, at the time the more noteworthy event.

The White City Stadium, built in short time for the games, held 68,000 people, with full crowds turning up to watch the events. The stadium track was three laps to the mile (536.448 metres per lap), as the current standard of 400 metres did not exist until 1962, with a pool (for swimming and diving events) and platforms (for wrestling and gymnastics) in the centre field.

The distance from the start of the marathon to the finish at the stadium was established at these games: the original distance of 25 miles was changed to 26 miles so the marathon could start at Windsor Castle and then changed again at the request of Princess Mary so the start would be beneath the windows of the Royal Nursery. To ensure that the race would finish in front of the King, the finish line was moved by British officials who "felt compelled to restore the importance of the monarchy." As a result of these changes, the marathon covered a distance of 26 miles and 385 yards (42.195 km), which became the standard length starting with the 1924 Summer Olympics.

== The games ==
There were controversies at the games. On the opening day, following the practice introduced at the Intercalated Games of 1906, teams paraded behind national flags. However, the arrangement caused complications:

- Since Finland was part of the Russian Empire, members of the Finnish team were expected to march under the Russian rather than Finnish flag, so many chose to march without a flag at all.
- The Swedish flag had not been displayed above the stadium, so the members of the Swedish team decided not to take part in the ceremony.
- The United States' flag bearer, Ralph Rose, refused to dip the flag to King-Emperor Edward VII in the royal box. His fellow athlete Martin Sheridan allegedly declared that "this flag dips to no earthly King." The quote is held as an example of Irish and American defiance of the British monarchy, though its historicity is disputed.

=== Events ===
The 1908 Olympics also prompted establishment of standard rules for sports, and selection of judges from different countries rather than just the host. One reason was the 400 metre race, in which a US runner, John Carpenter, was accused by the British officials of interfering with a British runner. Part of the problem was the different definition of interference under British and international rules (the events were held under British rules by the decision of the Organising Committee). The officials decided to disqualify Carpenter and ordered a second final race without him. British Halswelle was to face the other two finalists. These athletes, William Robbins and John Taylor, were both Americans and decided not to participate in the repeat of the final to protest against the judges' decision. Halswelle was thus the only medallist in the 400 metres.

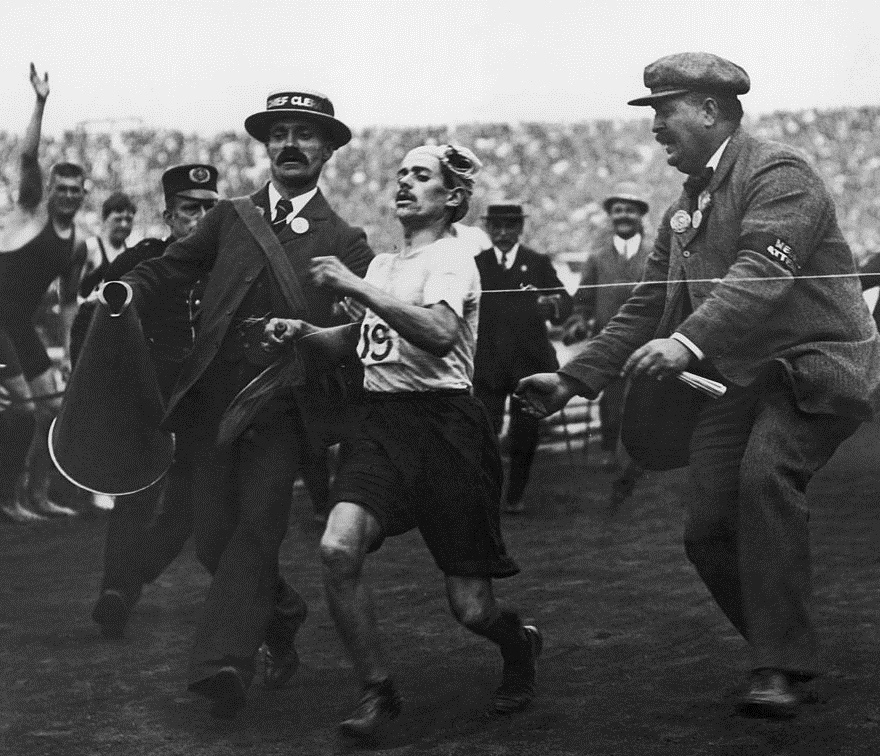
Dorando Pietri finishes the marathon.

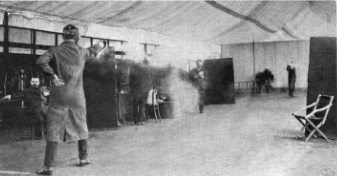
Original caption: "One of the most curious contests at the Olympic Games is the duelling with wax bullets. The combatants are as elaborately protected as a German student duellist, and even the revolver has a large hand-guard. The helmet has a plate-glass window."

The most famous incident of the games came at the end of the marathon. Dorando Pietri, Italy, began his race at a rather slow pace, but in the second half of the course began a powerful surge moving him into second position by the 32 km (20 mi) mark, 4 minutes behind South African Charles Hefferon. When he knew that Hefferon was in crisis, Pietri further increased his pace, overtaking him at the 39 km (24 mi) mark.

The effort took its toll and with only two kilometres to go, Pietri began to feel the effects of extreme fatigue and dehydration. When he entered the stadium, he took the wrong path and when umpires redirected him, he fell down for the first time. He got up with their help, in front of 75,000 spectators.

He fell four more times, and each time the umpires helped him up. In the end, though totally exhausted, he managed to finish the race in first place. Of his total time of 2h 54min 46s, ten minutes were needed for that last 340 metres. Second was American Johnny Hayes. The American team immediately lodged a complaint against the help Pietri received from the umpires. The complaint was accepted and Pietri was disqualified and removed from the final standings of the race. Since he had not been responsible for his disqualification, Queen Alexandra awarded him a gilded silver cup the next day.

These games were the first to include winter events, as had originally been proposed for the games. There were four figure skating events, although held on 28 and 29 October, months after most of the other events.

Oscar Swahn from Sweden, who won the gold medal for running deer shooting, became the oldest Olympic champion of all time, and set another age record by being 72 years and 279 days old during his triumph at the 1920 Summer Olympics in Antwerp, Belgium. One of the more unusual shooting events in 1908 was Olympic dueling. The discipline, which was an associate event (that is, not official), was performed by facing opponents wearing protective clothing and masks and firing wax bullets.

American John Taylor was a member of the winning medley relay team, making him the first African-American athlete to win an Olympic gold medal. Times for the winning team were United States (3:29.4): William Hamilton, 200 metres (22.0); Nathaniel Cartmell, 200 metres (22.2); John Taylor, 400 metres (49.8); and Melvin Sheppard, 800 metres (1:55.4). Less than five months after returning from the Olympic Games in London, Taylor died of typhoid fever on 2 December 1908 at the age of 26.

The budget of the organising committee showed a cost of £15,000; over one-third was labelled "entertainment expense". Donations were the major source of revenue; only 28% of income derived from ticket sales. Total receipts of £21,378 resulted in organisers claiming a profit. Construction of the White City Stadium, which cost the government about £60,000, was not counted.

== Sports ==
Twenty-two sports, representing 110 events in 25 sporting disciplines, were competed. A golf tournament had also been planned but it was cancelled a few days before it was scheduled to start. Swimming, diving, and water polo are considered three disciplines of the same sport, aquatics. At the time, tug-of-war was part of athletics and the two different football codes (association and rugby (union)) were listed together. The International Olympic Committee now considers tug-of-war a separate sport as well as referring to association football as simply "football" and to rugby union as "rugby." In one of seven cycling events (cycling sprint) no medals were awarded. The sailing program was open for a total of five sailing classes, but actually only four sailing events were competed. The number of events in each discipline is noted in parentheses.

- Aquatics
  - Diving (2) (14 July 1908 to 24 July 1908)
  - Swimming (6) (13–25 July 1908)
  - Water polo (1) (July 15 (quarterfinal), July 20 (semifinal) July 22 (final))
- Archery (3) (17–20 July 1908)
- Athletics (26) (13–25 July 1908)
- Boxing (5) (27 October 1908)
- Cycling (7) (13 –18 July 1908)
- Fencing (4) (July 17–24)
- Figure skating (4) (October 28-29)
- Football (1) (19–24 October 1908)
- Gymnastics (2) (July 14–16, 1908)
- Field hockey (1) (29–31 October 1908)
- Jeu de paume (1) (May 18–23)
- Lacrosse (1) (October 24)
- Polo (1) (18 June & 21 June 1908)
- Rackets (2) (April 27–May 1)
- Rowing (4) (28–31 July 1908)
- Rugby union (1) (26 October)
- Sailing (4) (27-29 July 1908 (Ryde), 11-12 August 1908 (Hunters Quay))
- Shooting (15) (8 – 11 July 1908)
- Tennis (6) (6–11 May 1908 (indoor), 6-11 July 1908 (outdoor))
- Tug of war (1) (July 17–18, 1908)
- Water motorsports (3) (August 28–29)
- Wrestling (20–25 July 1908)
  - Wrestling Freestyle (5)
  - Wrestling Greco-Roman (4)

Cycle polo, glima and pistol dueling were demonstration sports.

== Venues ==
Map of London with Olympic venues marked
Map of Great Britain with Olympic venues marked

Thirteen sports venues were used for the 1908 Summer Olympics. The first winter sports took place at Prince's Skating Club in Knightsbridge. White City Stadium served as a precursor to modern stadiums. The figure skating events were not held at the next Olympics in Stockholm, but returned for the 1920 Games in Antwerp, heralding the first Winter Olympics that took place in Chamonix in 1924. White City was the main venue for the 1934 British Empire Games (known as the Commonwealth Games since 1978) and, before its demolition in 1985, also served as a venue for the 1966 FIFA World Cup. The All England Lawn Tennis Club continues to host the Wimbledon championships and is the only venue of the 1908 Games that was used for the 2012 Summer Olympics.

Bisley and Henley served as venues in the 1948 Games when the Olympics returned to London forty years later.

Venue	Sports	Capacity	Ref.
All England Lawn Tennis and Croquet Club	Tennis	Not listed	
Bisley Ranges, Surrey	Shooting (pistol/rifle)	Not listed	
Franco-British Exhibition Fencing Grounds, Shepherd's Bush	Fencing	Not listed	
Henley Royal Regatta, Oxfordshire	Rowing	Not listed	
Hunters Quay, Scotland	Sailing (12 Metre)	Not listed	
The Hurlingham Club	Polo	Not listed	
Northampton Institute, Islington	Boxing	Not listed	
Prince's Skating Club	Figure skating	Not listed	
Queen's Club	Jeu de paume, Rackets	Not listed	
Royal Victoria Yacht Club, Ryde	Sailing (6, 7, 8 and 15 Metre)	Not listed	
Southampton Water	Water motorsports	Not listed	
Uxendon Shooting School Club	Shooting (shotgun)	Not listed	
White City Stadium	Archery, Athletics, Cycling (track), Diving, Field hockey, Football, Gymnastics, Lacrosse, Rugby union, Swimming, Tug of war, Water polo (final), Wrestling	68,000	

== Participating nations ==
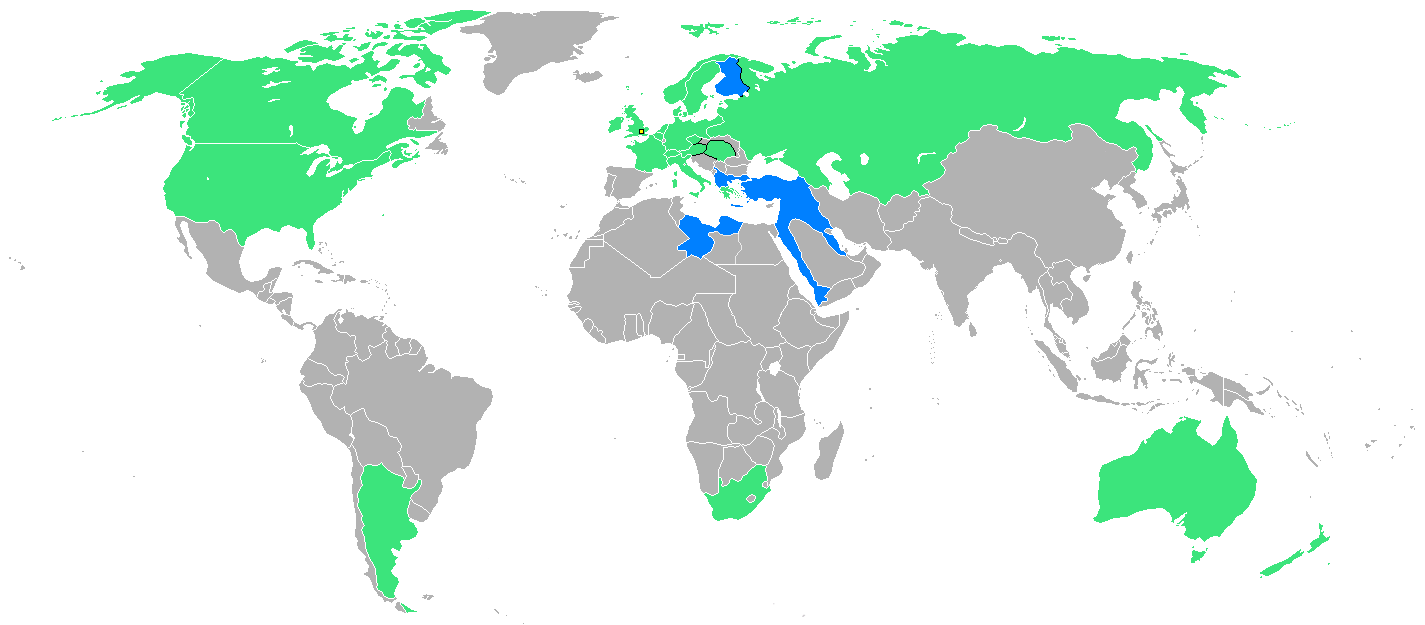
Participants of the 1908 Games

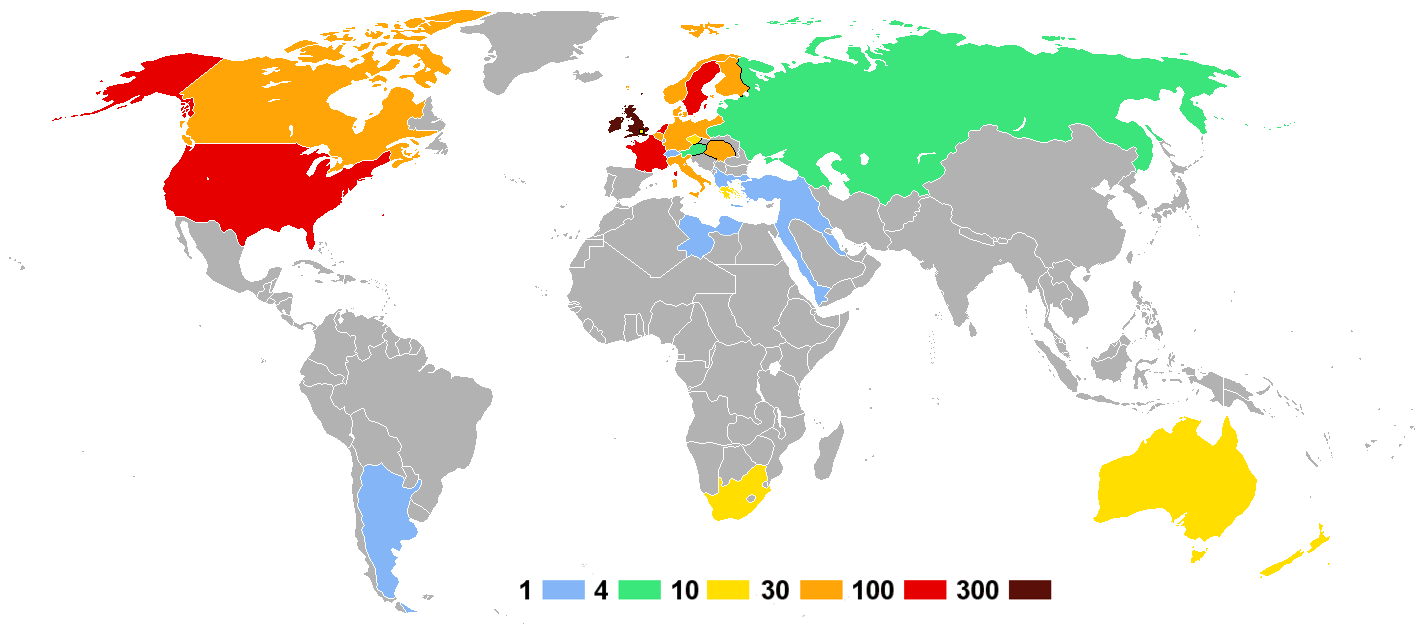
Number of participating athletes per country

The 1908 Games featured athletes representing 22 National Olympic Committees. Finland, Turkey and New Zealand (as part of the team from Australasia) made their first appearance at the Olympic Games. The fact that the United Kingdom competed as a single team was upsetting to some Irish competitors, who felt that Ireland should compete on its own, despite being part of the UK at the time. They relied on the precedent set by Grand Duchy of Finland, which while being a part of the Russian Empire, competed in London as a separate country. Fearing an Irish boycott, the authorities changed the name of the team to Great Britain/Ireland, and in two sports, field hockey and polo, Ireland participated as a separate country, winning silver medals in both, although their medals counted towards the UK's tally. Irish athletes in the United States were not affected by this controversy, and many Irish immigrants to the United States competed for the U.S. Olympic team as members of the Irish American Athletic Club. Members of the Irish American Athletic Club won ten of the U.S. Olympic team's total 23 gold medals, or as many as the nations of France, Germany and Italy combined.

Britain had more than a quarter of competitors in their team, with 676, compared to 112 on the American team which placed second in the medal standings.

Participating National Olympic Committees
- Argentina (1)
- Australasia (30)
- Austria (7)
- Belgium (88)
- Bohemia (19)
- Canada (87)
- Denmark (79)
- Finland (67)
- France (363)
- Germany (81)
- Great Britain (676) (host)
- Greece (20)
- Hungary (63)
- Italy (68)
- Netherlands (113)
- Norway (69)
- Russian Empire (6)
- South Africa (14)
- Sweden (168)
- Switzerland (1)
- Turkey (1)
- United States (112)

- Iceland (1) – Some historians claim that the country first participated in these games while still being a part of Denmark.

=== Number of athletes by National Olympic Committees ===
Country	Athletes
Great Britain	676
France	363
Sweden	168
Netherlands	113
United States	112
Belgium	88
Canada	87
Denmark	81
Germany	81
Norway	69
Italy	68
Finland	67
Hungary	63
Australasia	32
Greece	20
Bohemia	19
South Africa	14
Austria	7
Russian Empire	6
Argentina	1
Switzerland	1
Turkey	1
Total	2,008

== Medal count ==
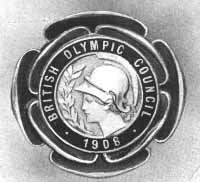
The medal of the 1908 British Olympic Council

These are the top ten nations that won medals at the 1908 Games.

* Host nation (Great Britain)

Rank	Nation	Gold	Silver	Bronze	Total
1	Great Britain*	56	51	39	146
2	United States	23	12	12	47
3	Sweden	8	6	11	25
4	France	5	5	9	19
5	Germany	3	5	5	13
6	Hungary	3	4	2	9
7	Canada	3	3	10	16
8	Norway	2	3	3	8
9	Italy	2	2	0	4
10	Belgium	1	5	2	8
Totals (10 entries)		106	96	93	295

== See also ==
- Olympic Games held in Great Britain
  - 1908 Summer Olympics – London
  - 1948 Summer Olympics – London
  - 2012 Summer Olympics – London
- List of IOC country codes
- History of Shepherd's Bush

Summer Olympics
Preceded by St. Louis	IV Olympiad; London; 1908	Succeeded by Stockholm
