= Athletics at the 1908 Summer Olympics =

Coordinates: 51.5136°N 0.2274°E

Athletics at the Games of the IV Olympiad
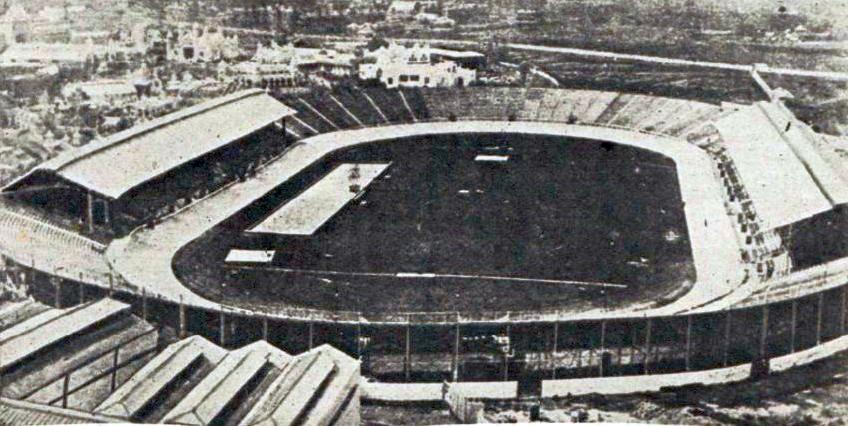
- Host stadium (shown in 1908)
- Venue: White City Stadium
- Dates: 13–25 July 1908
- No. of events: 26
- Competitors: 446 from 20 nations

At the 1908 Summer Olympics held in London, England, 26 athletics events were contested, all for men only. A total of 79 medals (27 gold, 27 silver, 25 bronze) were awarded.

Each nation was allowed to enter up to 12 competitors in most of the events. In the team races (the medley relay and the 3 mile team race), each nation entered one team. The medley relay was run by four athletes, with four alternates allowed. In the 3 mile team race, five athletes from each nation ran with only three counting.

The competition was restricted to amateurs, and was held under the rules of the British Amateur Athletic Association.

== Medal summary ==
Event	Gold		Silver		Bronze	
100 metres	Reggie Walker; South Africa	10.8 OR	James Rector; United States	(10.9) (Note: Estimated from 1.5 ft distance behind winner)	Robert Kerr; Canada	(11.0) (Note: Estimated from "close behind" distance behind 2nd place)
200 metres	Robert Kerr; Canada	22.6	Robert Cloughen; United States	22.6	Nate Cartmell; United States	22.7
400 metres	Wyndham Halswelle; Great Britain	50.0	none awarded		none awarded	
800 metres	Mel Sheppard; United States	1:52.8 WR	Emilio Lunghi; Italy	1:54.2	Hanns Braun; Germany	1:55.2
1500 metres	Mel Sheppard; United States	4:03.4 OR	Harold Wilson; Great Britain	4:03.6	Norman Hallows; Great Britain	4:04.0
5 miles	Emil Voigt; Great Britain	25:11.2 OR	Edward Owen; Great Britain	25:24.0	John Svanberg; Sweden	25:37.2
Marathon	Johnny Hayes; United States	2:55:18.4 WR	Charles Hefferon; South Africa	2:56:06.0	Joseph Forshaw; United States	2:57:10.4
110 metres hurdles	Forrest Smithson; United States	15.0 WR	John Garrels; United States	15.7	Arthur Shaw; United States	15.8
400 metres hurdles	Charles Bacon; United States	55.0 WR	Harry Hillman; United States	55.3	Jimmy Tremeer; Great Britain	57.0
3200 metres steeplechase	Arthur Russell; Great Britain	10:47.8	Arthur Robertson; Great Britain	10:48.4	John Eisele; United States	11:00.8
Medley relay	United States; William Hamilton; Nate Cartmell; John Taylor; Mel Sheppard	3:29.4	Germany; Arthur Hoffmann; Hans Eicke; Otto Trieloff; Hanns Braun	3:32.4	Hungary; Pál Simon; Frigyes Wiesner; József Nagy; Ödön Bodor	3:32.5
3 miles team race	Great Britain; William Coales 14:41.6; Joe Deakin 14:39.6; Arthur Robertson 14:41.0	6 pts	United States; George Bonhag 15:05.0; John Eisele 14:41.8; Herbert Trube 15:11.0	19 pts	France; Joseph Dreher 15:40.0; Louis de Fleurac 14:56.0; Paul Lizandier 15:56.6	32 pts
3500 metres walk	George Larner; Great Britain	14:55.0 WR	Ernest Webb; Great Britain	15:07.4	Harry Kerr; Australasia	15:43.4
10 miles walk	George Larner; Great Britain	1:15:57.4 WR	Ernest Webb; Great Britain	1:17:31.0	Edward Spencer; Great Britain	1:21:20.2
Long jump	Frank Irons; United States	7.48 m OR	Daniel Kelly; United States	7.09 m	Calvin Bricker; Canada	7.08 m
Triple jump	Tim Ahearne; Great Britain	14.92 m OR	Garfield MacDonald; Canada	14.76 m	Edvard Larsen; Norway	14.39 m
High jump	Harry Porter; United States	1.90 m OR	Géo André; France	1.88 m	none awarded	
High jump	Harry Porter; United States	1.90 m OR	Con Leahy; Great Britain	1.88 m	none awarded	
High jump	Harry Porter; United States	1.90 m OR	István Somodi; Hungary	1.88 m	none awarded	
Pole vault	Edward Cook; United States	3.71 m OR	none awarded		Edward Archibald; Canada	3.58 m
Pole vault	Edward Cook; United States	3.71 m OR	none awarded		Clare Jacobs; United States	3.58 m
Pole vault	Alfred Gilbert; United States	3.71 m OR	none awarded		Clare Jacobs; United States	3.58 m
Pole vault	Alfred Gilbert; United States	3.71 m OR	none awarded		Bruno Söderström; Sweden	3.58 m
Standing long jump	Ray Ewry; United States	3.33 m	Konstantinos Tsiklitiras; Greece	3.235 m	Martin Sheridan; United States	3.23 m
Standing high jump	Ray Ewry; United States	1.57 m	John Biller; United States	1.55 m	none awarded	
Standing high jump	Ray Ewry; United States	1.57 m	Konstantinos Tsiklitiras; Greece	1.55 m	none awarded	
Shot put	Ralph Rose; United States	14.21 m	Denis Horgan; Great Britain	13.62 m	John Garrels; United States	13.18 m
Discus throw	Martin Sheridan; United States	40.89 m OR	Merritt Giffin; United States	40.70 m	Bill Horr; United States	39.45 m
Hammer throw	John Flanagan; United States	51.92 m OR	Matt McGrath; United States	51.18 m	Con Walsh; Canada	48.51 m
Javelin throw	Eric Lemming; Sweden	54.83 m WR	Arne Halse; Norway	50.57 m	Otto Nilsson; Sweden	47.11 m
Greek discus	Martin Sheridan; United States	37.99 m	Bill Horr; United States	37.32 m	Verner Järvinen; Finland	36.48 m
Freestyle javelin	Eric Lemming; Sweden	54.44 m WR	Michalis Dorizas; Greece	51.36 m	Arne Halse; Norway	49.73 m

== Medal table ==
Rank	Nation	Gold	Silver	Bronze	Total
1	United States	16	10	8	34
2	Great Britain	7	7	3	17
3	Sweden	2	0	3	5
4	Canada	1	1	4	6
5	South Africa	1	1	0	2
6	Greece	0	3	0	3
7	Norway	0	1	2	3
8	France	0	1	1	2
8	Germany	0	1	1	2
8	Hungary	0	1	1	2
11	Italy	0	1	0	1
12	Australasia	0	0	1	1
12	Finland	0	0	1	1
Totals (13 entries)		27	27	25	79

== Events ==
The 1908 Games were the first to feature race walking, with two different events held. Two different forms of javelin throwing also appeared, introducing the new throwing apparatus to the programme. The 60 metre short sprint was dropped from the programme, as was the middle hurdle distance. Steeplechasing was done at 3200 metres instead of the 2500 metres that had been included at the previous two editions; the team race also had its distance shortened. A short track relay event was added. The multi-discipline triathlon and decathlon events that had been held at the 1904 Games were both absent. An event featuring the discus, which had become a staple of Olympic athletics, was held in which throwers had to follow a very specific throwing style. Overall there was one more event on the 1908 programme than there had been in 1904.

== Calendar ==
●	Event competitions	●	Event finals

July	13th	14th	15th	16th	17th	18th	19th	20th	21st	22nd	23rd	24th	25th
100 metres								●	●	●			
200 metres									●	●	●		
400 metres									●	●	●		●
800 metres								●	●				
1500 metres	●	●											
110 metres hurdles											●	●	●
400 metres hurdles								●	●	●			
3200 metres steeplechase					●	●							
Medley relay												●	●
3 miles team race		●	●										
5 miles			●			●							
marathon												●	
3500 metres walk		● ●											
10 miles walk				●	●								
Long jump										●			
Triple jump													●
High jump									●				
Pole vault												●	
Standing long jump								●					
Standing high jump											●		
Shot put				●									
Discus throw				●									
Hammer throw		●											
Javelin throw					●								
Greek discus						●							
Freestyle javelin			●										
July	13th	14th	15th	16th	17th	18th	19th	20th	21st	22nd	23rd	24th	25th

== Participating nations ==
446 athletes from 20 nations competed. Argentina and Turkey were the only two nations not to compete in athletics.

- Australasia (9)
- Austria (3)
- Belgium (6)
- Bohemia (3)
- Canada (27)
- Denmark (8)
- Finland (15)
- France (19)
- Germany (21)
- Great Britain (126)

- Greece (12)
- Hungary (20)
- Italy (13)
- Netherlands (20)
- Norway (11)
- Russian Empire (1)
- South Africa (9)
- Sweden (33)
- Switzerland (1)
- United States (89)
