= Team races at the Olympics =

Team race at the Olympic Games
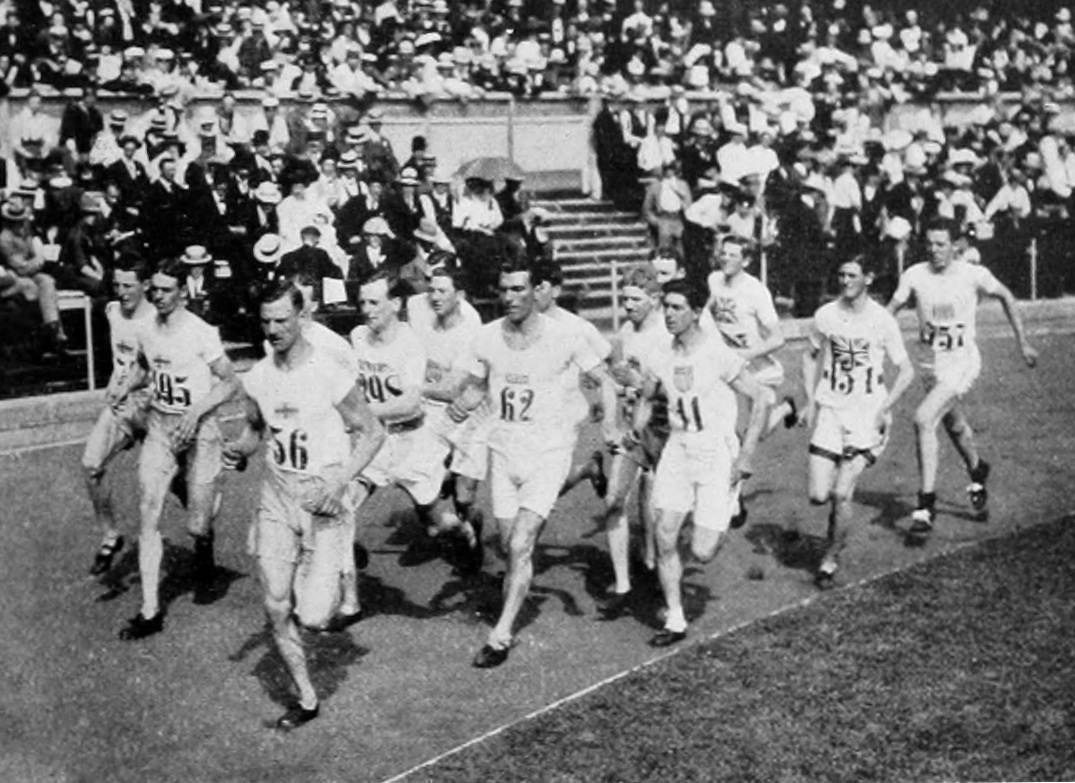
- The 1912 team race final

Overview
- Sport: Athletics
- Gender: Men
- Years held: Men: 1900–1924

Team races at the Summer Olympics were track running competitions contested at the multi-sport event from 1900 to 1924.

The first such event was over 5000 metres at the 1900 Summer Olympics. This became a 4-mile race for the 1904 Summer Olympics, then a 3-mile race for the 1908 Summer Olympics. The most consistent format was over 3000 metres: this distance was contested on three consecutive occasions from 1912 to 1924, at which point track team races were removed from the Olympic athletics programme.

The races typically permitted up to five athletes per nation, with a minimum of three required to form a team. Each team score was the sum of the finishing positions of that nation's top three athletes. For example, first, second and third places would create a team score of six.

For 1900 and 1904 only two teams were entered: the point scoring format incorporated all five of each team's runners. On both occasions these were races between two major athletic clubs. In 1900 Racing Club de France competed against the Amateur Athletic Association (AAA) of Great Britain. In 1904 the New York Athletic Club took on the Chicago Athletic Association. Until 2024, the International Olympic Committee (IOC) classified all teams composed of athletes from different countries in the early Olympics (1896–1904) as mixed teams (IOC code ZZX), regardless of whether they represented an established club. Since 2024, teams representing a club have been attributed to the club's country, even if they included foreign athletes. Therefore, the medals of AAA (with Australian Stan Rowley) and the Chicago team (with French immigrant to the United States Albert Corey) are now attributed to Great Britain and the United States, respectively.

== Medal summary ==
Games	Gold	Silver	Bronze
1900 Paris (5000 m)	Great Britain; Charles Bennett (GBR); John Rimmer (GBR); Sidney Robinson (GBR); Alfred Tysoe (GBR); Stan Rowley (AUS)	France; Henri Deloge; Gaston Ragueneau; Jacques Chastanié; André Castanet; Michel Champoudry	none awarded
1904 St. Louis (4 miles)	United States; Arthur Newton; George Underwood; Paul Pilgrim; Howard Valentine; David Munson	United States; James Lightbody (USA); Frank Verner (USA); Lacey Hearn (USA); Albert Corey (FRA); Sidney Hatch (USA)	none awarded
1908 London (3 miles)	Great Britain; Joe Deakin; Archie Robertson; William Coales; Harold A. Wilson; Norman Hallows	United States; John Eisele; George Bonhag; Herbert Trube; Gayle Dull; Harvey Cohn	France; Louis de Fleurac; Joseph Dreher; Paul Lizandier; Jean Bouin; Alexandre Fayollat
1912 Stockholm (3000 m)	United States; Tell Berna; George Bonhag; Abel Kiviat; Louis Scott; Norman Taber	Sweden; Bror Fock; Nils Frykberg; Thorild Olsson; Ernst Wide; John Zander	Great Britain; Joe Cottrill; George Hutson; William Moore; Edward Owen; Cyril Porter
1920 Antwerp (3000 m)	United States; Horace Brown; Ivan Dresser; Arlie Schardt	Great Britain; Joe Blewitt; Albert Hill; William Seagrove	Sweden; Eric Backman; Sven Lundgren; Edvin Wide
1924 Paris (3000 m)	Finland; Elias Katz; Paavo Nurmi; Ville Ritola	Great Britain; Herbert Johnston; Bertram Macdonald; George Webber	United States; William Cox; Edward Kirby; Willard Tibbetts

=== Multiple medalists ===
Rank	Athlete	Nation	Olympics	Gold	Silver	Bronze	Total
1	George Bonhag	United States	1908–1912	1	1	0	2

- Note: William Seagrove was a 1920 silver medallist and was part of the British team in 1924, but as he was not in the top three British runners he did form part of their silver medal-winning team.

=== Medals by country ===
Rank	Nation	Gold	Silver	Bronze	Total
1	United States	3	2	1	6
2	Great Britain	2	2	1	5
3	Finland	1	0	0	1
4=	France	0	1	1	2
4=	Sweden	0	1	1	2

== Non-canonical Olympic events ==
In addition to the main 1904 4-mile team race, a handicap competition was also staged. This race, contested over one mile, saw Missouri Athletic Club take on fellow American sports club St. Louis Southwest Turnverein. Missouri won the race in a time of 3:52.2, with the St. Louis team finishing some 80 yards off the winners.

This handicap race, along with numerous other handicap athletics events, is no longer considered part of the official Olympic history of the team race or the athletics programme in general. Consequently, medals from these competitions have not been assigned to nations on the all-time medal tables.
