= United States at the 1908 Summer Olympics =

- Flag of the United States (despite receiving the 46th star on July 4, 1908, after Oklahoma gained statehood, the 45-star flag was used in the early days of the games)
- IOC code: USA
- NOC: United States Olympic Committee

in London
- Competitors: 112
- Flag bearer: Ralph Rose
- Medals Ranked 2nd: Gold 23 Silver 12 Bronze 12 Total 47

Summer Olympics appearances (overview)
- 1896; 1900; 1904; 1908; 1912; 1920; 1924; 1928; 1932; 1936; 1948; 1952; 1956; 1960; 1964; 1968; 1972; 1976; 1980; 1984; 1988; 1992; 1996; 2000; 2004; 2008; 2012; 2016; 2020; 2024; 2028

Other related appearances
- 1906 Intercalated Games

The United States, the previous host of the 1904 Summer Olympics in St. Louis, Missouri, competed at the 1908 Summer Olympics in London, England, United Kingdom. During the opening ceremony, American athletes did not dip their flag to the British royalty in support of the Irish boycott over Great Britain's refusal to grant Irish independence.

== Medalists ==
Medal	Name	Sport	Event	Date
Gold	Mel Sheppard	Athletics	Men's 800 m	July 21
Gold	Mel Sheppard	Athletics	Men's 1500 m	July 14
Gold	Johnny Hayes	Athletics	Men's marathon	July 24
Gold	Forrest Smithson	Athletics	Men's 110 m hurdles	July 25
Gold	Charles Bacon	Athletics	Men's 400 m hurdles	July 22
Gold	Nathaniel Cartmell, William Hamilton, John Taylor, Mel Sheppard	Athletics	Men's medley relay	July 25
Gold	Frank Irons	Athletics	Men's long jump	July 22
Gold	Harry Porter	Athletics	Men's high jump	July 21
Gold	Edward Cook	Athletics	Men's pole vault	July 24
Gold	Alfred Carlton Gilbert	Athletics	Men's pole vault	July 24
Gold	Ray Ewry	Athletics	Men's standing long jump	July 20
Gold	Ray Ewry	Athletics	Men's standing high jump	July 23
Gold	Ralph Rose	Athletics	Men's shot put	July 16
Gold	Martin Sheridan	Athletics	Men's discus throw	July 16
Gold	Martin Sheridan	Athletics	Men's Greek discus	July 18
Gold	John Flanagan	Athletics	Men's hammer throw	July 14
Gold	Jay Gould II	Jeu de paume		May 23
Gold	Charles Benedict, Kellogg Casey, Ivan Eastman, William Leushner, William Martin, Charles Winder	Shooting	Men's military rifle, team	July 11
Gold	Walter W. Winans	Shooting	Men's double-shot running deer	July 10
Gold	Charles Axtell, Irving Calkins, John Dietz, James Gorman	Shooting	Men's 50 yd free pistol, team	July 11
Gold	Charles Daniels	Swimming	Men's 100 m freestyle	July 20
Gold	George Mehnert	Wrestling	Men's freestyle bantamweight	July 20
Gold	George Dole	Wrestling	Men's freestyle featherweight	July 22
Silver	James Rector	Athletics	Men's 100 m	July 22
Silver	Robert Cloughen	Athletics	Men's 200 m	July 23
Silver	John Garrels	Athletics	Men's 110 m hurdles	July 24
Silver	Harry Hillman	Athletics	Men's 400 m hurdles	July 22
Silver	George Bonhag, John Eisele, Herbert Trube	Athletics	Men's 3 miles team race	July 15
Silver	Daniel Kelly	Athletics	Men's long jump	July 22
Silver	John Biller	Athletics	Men's standing high jump	July 23
Silver	Merritt Giffin	Athletics	Men's discus throw	July 18
Silver	Matt McGrath	Athletics	Men's hammer throw	July 14
Silver	Bill Horr	Athletics	Men's Greek discus	July 18
Silver	Kellogg Casey	Shooting	Men's 1000 yd free rifle	July 9
Silver	Harry Simon	Shooting	Men's 300 m free rifle, three positions	July 11
Bronze	Henry B. Richardson	Archery	Men's double York round	July 18
Bronze	Nathaniel Cartmell	Athletics	Men's 200 metres	July 23
Bronze	Joseph Forshaw	Athletics	Men's marathon	July 24
Bronze	Arthur Shaw	Athletics	Men's 110 m hurdles	July 25
Bronze	John Eisele	Athletics	Men's 3200 m steeplechase	July 18
Bronze	Clare Jacobs	Athletics	Men's pole vault	July 24
Bronze	John Garrels	Athletics	Men's shot put	July 16
Bronze	Bill Horr	Athletics	Men's discus throw	July 16
Bronze	Martin Sheridan	Athletics	Men's standing long jump	July 20
Bronze	George Gaidzik	Diving	Men's 3 m springboard	July 18
Bronze	James Gorman	Shooting	Men's 50 yd free pistol	July 10
Bronze	Charles Daniels, Leo Goodwin, Harry Hebner, Leslie Rich	Swimming	Men's 4 × 200 m freestyle relay	July 20

== Results by event ==
=== Archery ===
The United States had one archer present in 1908. The 19-year-old Richardson had already won an Olympic bronze medal, in the team event at the 1904 Summer Olympics. He competed in both events open to men, taking the bronze medal in the York rounds and 15th place in the Continental style.

Event	Place	Archer	Score
Men's double York round	3rd	Henry B. Richardson	760
Men's Continental style	15th	Henry B. Richardson	171

=== Athletics ===
American track & field athletes continued to dominate the sport, taking more than twice as many championships as the next most successful nation, host Great Britain.

==== Running ====
Event	Place	Athlete	Heats	Semifinals	Final
Men's 100 metres	2nd	James Rector	10.8 seconds (=OR); 1st, heat 15	10.8 seconds (=OR); 1st, semifinal 3	10.8 seconds (=OR)
Men's 100 metres	4th	Nate Cartmell	11.0 seconds 1st, heat 3	11.2 seconds 1st, semifinal 4	11.0 seconds
Men's 100 metres	Semi- finalist	William W. May	11.2 seconds 1st, heat 6	11.0 seconds 2nd, semifinal 1	Did not advance
Men's 100 metres	Semi- finalist	Harold Huff	11.4 seconds 1st, heat 12	11.1 seconds 2nd, semifinal 3	Did not advance
Men's 100 metres	Semi- finalist	Lawson Robertson	11.4 seconds 1st, heat 13	11.2 seconds 2nd, semifinal 4	Did not advance
Men's 100 metres	Semi- finalist	Nathaniel Sherman	11.2 seconds 1st, heat 14	11.3 seconds 2nd, semifinal 2	Did not advance
Men's 100 metres	Semi- finalist	Lester Stevens	11.2 seconds 1st, heat 8	Unknown; 4th, semifinal 1	Did not advance
Men's 100 metres	Semi- finalist	Robert Cloughen	11.0 seconds 1st, heat 5	Did not start —, semifinal 1	Did not advance
Men's 100 metres	Semi- finalist	William Hamilton	11.2 seconds 1st, heat 11	Did not start —, semifinal 2	Did not advance
Men's 100 metres	Heats	Edgar Kiralfy	Unknown; 4th/5th, heat 4	Did not advance	
Men's 200 metres	2nd	Robert Cloughen	23.4 seconds 1st, heat 8	22.6 seconds 1st, semifinal 3	22.6 seconds
Men's 200 metres	3rd	Nate Cartmell	23.0 seconds 1st, heat 4	22.6 seconds 1st, semifinal 2	22.7 seconds
Men's 200 metres	Semi- finalist	William Hamilton	22.4 seconds 1st, heat 10	Unknown; 2nd, semifinal 1	Did not advance
Men's 200 metres	Semi- finalist	Nathaniel Sherman	22.8 seconds 1st, heat 12	Unknown; 2nd, semifinal 2	Did not advance
Men's 200 metres	Semi- finalist	Harold Huff	22.8 seconds 1st, heat 2	Unknown; 3rd, semifinal 2	Did not advance
Men's 200 metres	Heats	Lawson Robertson	Unknown; 2nd, heat 3	Did not advance	
Men's 200 metres	Heats	William W. May	Unknown; 2nd, heat 11	Did not advance	
Men's 400 metres	Finalist	John Taylor	50.8 seconds 1st, heat 4	49.8 seconds 1st, semifinal 3	Did not start
Men's 400 metres	Finalist	William Robbins	50.4 seconds 1st, heat 7	49.0 seconds 1st, semifinal 4	Did not start
Men's 400 metres	Finalist	John Carpenter	49.8 seconds 1st, heat 14	49.4 seconds 1st, semifinal 1	Disqualified
Men's 400 metres	Semi- finalist	Horace Ramey	51.0 seconds 1st, heat 9	Unknown; 2nd, semifinal 3	Did not advance
Men's 400 metres	Semi- finalist	Ned Merriam	52.2 seconds 1st, heat 13	Unknown; 3rd, semifinal 1	Did not advance
Men's 400 metres	Semi- finalist	John Atlee	50.4 seconds 1st, heat 11	Unknown; 3rd, semifinal 4	Did not advance
Men's 400 metres	Semi- finalist	William C. Prout	50.4 seconds 1st, heat 8	Unknown; 4th, semifinal 2	Did not advance
Men's 400 metres	Heats	Paul Pilgrim	Unknown; 2nd, heat 1	Did not advance	
Men's 400 metres	Heats	Frederick de Selding	Unknown; 2nd, heat 15	Did not advance	
Men's 800 metres	1st	Mel Sheppard	None held	1:58.0; 1st, semifinal 2	1:52.8 (OR)
Men's 800 metres	6th	John Halstead	None held	2:01.4; 1st, semifinal 3	Unknown
Men's 800 metres	7-8	Clarke Beard	None held	1:59.2; 1st, semifinal 5	Did not finish
Men's 800 metres	Semi- finalist	Harry Coe	None held	Unknown; 2nd, semifinal 4	Did not advance
Men's 800 metres	Semi- finalist	Joseph Bromilow	None held	Unknown; 2nd, semifinal 7	Did not advance
Men's 800 metres	Semi- finalist	Lloyd Jones	None held	Unknown; 3rd, semifinal 4	Did not advance
Men's 800 metres	Semi- finalist	Francis Sheehan	None held	Unknown; 3rd, semifinal 8	Did not advance
Men's 800 metres	Semi- finalist	James Lightbody	None held	Unknown; 4th, semifinal 1	Did not advance
Men's 800 metres	—	Charles French	None held	Did not finish —, semifinal 5	Did not advance
Men's 800 metres	—	Horace Ramey	None held	Did not finish —, semifinal 7	Did not advance
Men's 1500 metres	1st	Mel Sheppard	None held	4:05.0 (OR); 1st, semifinal 2	4:03.4 (=OR)
Men's 1500 metres	7-8	James P. Sullivan	None held	4:07.6; 1st, semifinal 1	Did not finish
Men's 1500 metres	Semi- finalist	James Lightbody	None held	Unknown; 2nd, semifinal 1	Did not advance
Men's 1500 metres	Semi- finalist	John Halstead	None held	Unknown; 2nd, semifinal 2	Did not advance
Men's 1500 metres	Semi- finalist	Harry Coe	None held	Unknown; 2nd, semifinal 4	Did not advance
Men's 1500 metres	—	Frank Riley	None held	Did not finish —, semifinal 3	Did not advance
Men's 110 metre hurdles	1st	Forrest Smithson	15.8 seconds 1st, heat 10	15.4 seconds (OR); 1st, semifinal 2	15.0 seconds (WR)
Men's 110 metre hurdles	2nd	John Garrels	16.2 seconds 1st, heat 2	15.8 seconds 1st, semifinal 4	15.7 seconds
Men's 110 metre hurdles	3rd	Arthur Shaw	Walkover; 1st, heat 14	15.6 seconds 1st, semifinal 1	15.8 seconds
Men's 110 metre hurdles	4th	William Rand	15.8 seconds 1st, heat 5	15.8 seconds 1st, semifinal 3	16.0 seconds
Men's 110 metre hurdles	Semi- finalist	Leonard Howe	15.8 seconds 1st, heat 13	Unknown; 3rd, semifinal 2	Did not advance
Men's 400 metre hurdles	1st	Charles Bacon	57.0 seconds (OR); 1st, heat 3	58.8 seconds 1st, semifinal 2	55.0 seconds (OR)
Men's 400 metre hurdles	2nd	Harry Hillman	59.2 seconds 1st, heat 6	56.4 seconds (OR); 1st, semifinal 1	55.3 seconds
Men's 400 metre hurdles	Semi- finalist	Harry Coe	58.8 seconds 1st, heat 2	Unknown; 2nd, semifinal 1	Did not advance
Men's 3200 metre steeplechase	3rd	John Eisele	None held	11:13.6; 1st, semifinal 2	11:00.8
Men's 3200 metre steeplechase	Semi- finalist	Gale Dull	None held	Unknown; 2nd, semifinal 4	Did not advance
Men's 3200 metre steeplechase	Semi- finalist	James Lightbody	None held	Unknown; 2nd, semifinal 6	Did not advance
Men's 3200 metre steeplechase	Semi- finalist	Roger Spitzer	None held	Unknown; 3rd, semifinal 5	Did not advance
Men's 3200 metre steeplechase	Semi- finalist	Charles Hall	None held	Unknown; 4th, semifinal 5	Did not advance
Men's 3200 metre steeplechase	—	Edward Carr	None held	Did not finish —, semifinal 1	Did not advance
Men's 3200 metre steeplechase	—	George Bonhag	None held	Did not finish —, semifinal 4	Did not advance
Men's medley relay	1st	William Hamilton; Nate Cartmell; John Taylor; Mel Sheppard	None held	3:27.2; 1st, semifinal 3	3:29.4
Men's 3 mile team race	2nd	John Eisele	None held	14:55.0; 2 points, team=10	14:41.8; 4 points, team=19
Men's 3 mile team race	2nd	George Bonhag	None held	14:56.4; 5 points, team=10	15:05.0; 6 points, team=19
Men's 3 mile team race	2nd	Herbert Trube	None held	14:55.0; 3 points, team=10	15:11.0; 9 points, team=19
Men's 3 mile team race	No place	Gale Dull	None held	15:37.4; No score, team=10	15:27.0; No score, team=19
Men's 3 mile team race	No place	Harvey Cohn	None held	Did not start No score, team=10	15:40.2; No score, team=19
Men's 5 miles	8th	Frederick Bellars	None held	Unknown; 2nd, semifinal 2	Unknown
Men's 5 miles	10-12	Edward Carr	None held	Unknown; 2nd, semifinal 3	Did not start
Men's 5 miles	Semi- finalist	Charles Hall	None held	Unknown; 4th, semifinal 3	Did not advance
Men's marathon	1st	Johnny Hayes	None held		2:55:18.4
Men's marathon	3rd	Joseph Forshaw	None held		2:57:10.4
Men's marathon	4th	Alton Welton	None held		2:59:44.4
Men's marathon	9th	Lewis Tewanima	None held		3:09:15.0
Men's marathon	14th	Sidney Hatch	None held		3:17:52.4
Men's marathon	—	Tom Morrissey	None held		Did not finish
Men's marathon	—	Michael Ryan	None held		Did not finish
Men's marathon	—	J. J. Lee	None held		Did not start
Men's marathon	—	Frederick Lorz	None held		Did not start
Men's marathon	—	W. O'Mara	None held		Did not start
Men's marathon	—	Alexander Thibeau	None held		Did not start
Men's marathon	—	W. Wood	None held		Did not start

==== Jumping ====
Event	Place	Athlete	Height/ Distance
Men's high jump	1st	Harry Porter	1.90 metres
Men's high jump	5th	Herbert Gidney	1.85 metres
Men's high jump	5th	Tom Moffitt	1.85 metres
Men's high jump	7th	Neil Patterson	1.83 metres
Men's long jump	1st	Frank Irons	7.48 metres
Men's long jump	2nd	Daniel Kelly	7.09 metres
Men's long jump	4th	Edward Cook	6.97 metres
Men's long jump	5th	John Brennan	6.86 metres
Men's long jump	7th	Frank Mount Pleasant	6.82 metres
Men's long jump	12th	Sam Bellah	6.64 metres
Men's long jump	21-32	John O'Connell	Unknown
Men's triple jump	5th	Platt Adams	14.07 metres
Men's triple jump	6th	Frank Mount Pleasant	13.97 metres
Men's triple jump	8th	John Brennan	13.59 metres
Men's triple jump	9th	Martin Sheridan	13.42 metres
Men's triple jump	16th	Frank Irons	12.67 metres
Men's triple jump	17th	Sam Bellah	12.55 metres
Men's triple jump	18-20	Nathaniel Sherman	Unknown
Men's pole vault	1st	Edward Cook	3.71 metres
Men's pole vault	1st	Alfred Carlton Gilbert	3.71 metres
Men's pole vault	3rd	Clare Jacobs	3.58 metres
Men's pole vault	6th	Sam Bellah	3.50 metres
Men's pole vault	12th	Thomas Jackson	3.05 metres
Men's standing high jump	1st	Ray Ewry	1.57 metres
Men's standing high jump	2nd	John Biller	1.55 metres
Men's standing high jump	4th	Leroy Holmes	1.52 metres
Men's standing high jump	5th	Platt Adams	1.47 metres
Men's standing high jump	8th	Frank Irons	1.42 metres
Men's standing high jump	16th	Martin Sheridan	1.37 metres
Men's standing high jump	19-23	Lawson Robertson	Unknown
Men's standing long jump	1st	Ray Ewry	3.33 metres
Men's standing long jump	3rd	Martin Sheridan	3.23 metres
Men's standing long jump	4th	John Biller	3.21 metres
Men's standing long jump	6th	Platt Adams	3.11 metres
Men's standing long jump	6th	Leroy Holmes	3.11 metres
Men's standing long jump	8-25	Frank Irons	Unknown
Men's standing long jump	8-25	Sigmund Muenz	Unknown

==== Throwing ====
Event	Place	Athlete	Distance
Men's shot put	1st	Ralph Rose	14.21 metres
Men's shot put	3rd	John Garrels	13.18 metres
Men's shot put	4th	Wesley Coe	13.07 metres
Men's shot put	6th	Bill Horr	12.83 metres
Men's shot put	8th	Lee Talbott	11.63 metres
Men's shot put	9-25	Wilbur Burroughs	Unknown
Men's shot put	9-25	Martin Sheridan	Unknown
Men's discus throw	1st	Martin Sheridan	40.89 metres
Men's discus throw	2nd	Merritt Giffin	40.70 metres
Men's discus throw	3rd	Bill Horr	39.45 metres
Men's discus throw	5th	Arthur Dearborn	38.52 metres
Men's discus throw	6th	Lee Talbott	38.40 metres
Men's discus throw	9th	John Flanagan	37.80 metres
Men's discus throw	10th	Wilbur Burroughs	37.43 metres
Men's discus throw	12-42	Platt Adams	Unknown
Men's discus throw	12-42	John Garrells	Unknown
Men's discus throw	12-42	Simon Gillis	Unknown
Men's hammer throw	1st	John Flanagan	51.92 metres
Men's hammer throw	2nd	Matthew McGrath	51.18 metres
Men's hammer throw	5th	Lee Talbott	47.86 metres
Men's hammer throw	6th	Bill Horr	46.97 metres
Men's hammer throw	7th	Simon Gillis	45.59 metres
Men's hammer throw	10-19	Benjamin Sherman	Unknown
Men's Greek discus	1st	Martin Sheridan	37.99 metres
Men's Greek discus	2nd	Bill Horr	37.32 metres
Men's Greek discus	4th	Arthur Dearborn	35.65 metres
Men's Greek discus	8th	Wilbur Burroughs	32.81 metres
Men's Greek discus	11-23	Platt Adams	Unknown
Men's Greek discus	11-23	John Garrels	Unknown

=== Cycling ===
Event	Place	Cyclist	Heats	Semifinals	Final
Men's 660 yards	Semi- finalist	George Cameron	1:05.2; 1st, heat 15	Unknown; 3rd, semifinal 3	Did not advance
Men's 20 kilometres	4th	Louis Weintz	None held	33:39.8; 1st, semifinal 3	Unknown
Men's 20 kilometres	Semi- finalist	George Cameron	None held	33:39.2; 2nd, semifinal 4	Did not advance
Men's 100 kilometres	—	Louis Weintz	None held	Did not finish —, semifinal 2	Did not advance
Men's sprint	Semi- finalist	George Cameron	1:29.4; 1st, heat 8	Unknown; 2-4, semifinal 2	Did not advance
Men's sprint	Heats	Louis Weintz	Unknown; 3rd, heat 13	Did not advance	
Men's team pursuit	—	Unknown	Did not start —, heat 2	Did not advance	

=== Diving ===
The Americans sent two divers in 1908. Gaidzik made it to the finals in both diving events, after a successful protest in the platform competition. He won a bronze medal in the springboard after tying with the third-place German diver.

Event	Place	Diver	Preliminary groups	Semi- finals	Final
Men's 10 metre platform	5th	George Gaidzik	81.80 points 1st, group 1	61.0 points 3rd, semifinal 2	56.30 points
Men's 10 metre platform	18th	Harold Grote	62.80 points 3rd, group 5	Did not advance	
Men's 3 metre springboard	3rd	George Gaidzik	82.80 points 1st, group 1	85.60 points 1st, semifinal 2	80.80 points
Men's 3 metre springboard	9th	Harold Grote	79.50 points 2nd, group 5	74.50 points 5th, semifinal 2	Did not advance

=== Figure skating ===
Event	Place	Skater	Score
Men's individual	6th	Irving Brokaw	232.0

=== Jeu de paume ===
In the jeu de paume competition, Gould won the gold medal while Sands was eliminated in the first round by the eventual silver medallist.

Event	Place	Player	Round of 16	Quarter- finals	Semi- finals	Final/ Bronze match
Jeu de paume	1st	Jay Gould	Bye	Defeated Pennell; 6-3, 6-3, 6-2	Defeated Page; 6-1, 6-0, 6-0	Defeated Miles; 6-5, 6-4, 6-4
Jeu de paume	9th	Charles Sands	Lost to Miles; 6-3, 6-3, 6-3	Did not advance		

Opponent nation	Wins	Losses	Percent
Great Britain	3	1	.750
Total	3	1	.750

=== Shooting ===
Event	Place	Shooter	Score
Men's 1000 yard free rifle	2nd	Kellogg Casey	93
Men's 1000 yard free rifle	11th	William Leuschner	89
Men's 1000 yard free rifle	13th	Charles Benedict	88
Men's 1000 yard free rifle	13th	Ivan Eastman	88
Men's 1000 yard free rifle	13th	Charles Jeffers	88
Men's 1000 yard free rifle	16th	Charles Winder	87
Men's 1000 yard free rifle	19th	Harry Simon	86
Men's 1000 yard free rifle	24th	Edward Greene	84
Men's 1000 yard free rifle	24th	John Hessian	84
Men's 300 metre free rifle	2nd	Harry Simon	887
Men's 300 metre free rifle	16th	Edward Greene	792
Men's 300 metre free rifle	29th	John Hessian	746
Men's team military rifle	1st	William Leuschner; William Martin; Charles Winder; Kellogg Casey; Ivan Eastman; Charles Benedict	2537
Men's moving target small-bore rifle	10th	Walter Winans	13
Men's disappearing target small-bore rifle	19th	Walter Winans	30
Men's single-shot running deer	6th	Walter Winans	21
Men's double-shot running deer	1st	Walter Winans	46
Men's individual pistol	3rd	James Gorman (sport shooter)	485
Men's individual pistol	4th	Charles Axtell	480
Men's individual pistol	8th	Irving Calkins	457
Men's individual pistol	9th	John Dietz	455
Men's individual pistol	19th	Thomas LeBoutillier	436
Men's individual pistol	21st	Reginald Sayre	430
Men's individual pistol	38th	Walter Winans	368
Men's team pistol	1st	James Gorman; Irving Calkins; John Dietz; Charles Axtell	1914

=== Swimming ===
Event	Place	Swimmer	Heats	Semifinals	Final
Men's 100 metre freestyle	1st	Charles Daniels	1:05.8; 1st, heat 5	1:10.2; 1st, semifinal 2	1:05.6
Men's 100 metre freestyle	4th	Leslie Rich	1:14.6; 1st, heat 9	1:10.8; 2nd, semifinal 2	Unknown
Men's 100 metre freestyle	Semi- finalist	Harry Hebner	1:11.0; 1st, heat 6	1:11.8; 3rd, semifinal 1	Did not advance
Men's 100 metre freestyle	Heats	Conrad Trubenbach	Unknown; 3-5, heat 2	Did not advance	
Men's 100 metre freestyle	Heats	Robert Foster	Unknown; 3-4, heat 4	Did not advance	
Men's 400 metre freestyle	Heats	Budd Goodwin	Unknown; 3rd, heat 1	Did not advance	
Men's 400 metre freestyle	Heats	Conrad Trubenbach	Unknown; 3rd, heat 4	Did not advance	
Men's 1500 metre freestyle	Heats	James Greene	28:09.0; 2nd, heat 5	Did not advance	
Men's 100 metre backstroke	Heats	Augustus Goessling	1:29.0; 2nd, heat 6	Did not advance	
Men's 200 metre breaststroke	Heats	Augustus Goessling	Unknown; 3rd, heat 2	Did not advance	
Men's 4x200 metre freestyle relay	3rd	Harry Hebner; Budd Goodwin; Charles Daniels; Leslie Rich	None held	11:01.4; 2nd, semifinal 2	11:02.8

=== Tug of war ===
Event	Place	Athletes	Quarterfinals	Semifinals	Final
Tug of war	5th	Wilbur Burroughs, Wesley Coe, Arthur Dearborn, John Flanagan, Bill Horr, Matthew McGrath, Ralph Rose, Lee Talbott	Lost to Great Britain; Liverpool Police	Did not advance	

=== Wrestling ===
Event	Place	Wrestler	Round of 16	Quarter- finals	Semi- finals	Final
Freestyle bantamweight	1st	George Mehnert	Bye	Defeated; Sprenger	Defeated; Côté	Defeated; Press
Freestyle featherweight	1st	George Dole	Defeated; Cockings	Defeated; Webster	Defeated; McKie	Defeated; Slim
Freestyle lightweight	5th	John Krug	Defeated; Hoy	Lost to Wood	Did not advance	
Freestyle middleweight	5th	John Craige	Bye	Lost to Andersson	Did not advance	
Freestyle middleweight	5th	Frederico Narganes	Bye	Lost to Beck	Did not advance	
Freestyle heavyweight	9th	Lee Talbott	Lost to O'Kelly	Did not advance		

Opponent nation	Wins	Losses	Percent
Canada	1	0	1.000
Great Britain	7	3	.700
Sweden	0	1	.000
Total	8	4	.667

== Sources ==
- Cook, Theodore Andrea (1908). The Fourth Olympiad, Being the Official Report. London: British Olympic Association.
- De Wael, Herman (2001). "Top London 1908 Olympians". Herman's Full Olympians. Archived from the original on July 12, 2006.
