= Athletics at the 1908 Summer Olympics – Men's 3 miles team race =

Athletics at the Olympics

Men's 3 miles team race at the Games of the IV Olympiad
- Venue: White City Stadium
- Dates: July 14, 1908 (semifinals); July 15, 1908 (final)
- Competitors: 28 from 6 nations

Medalists
1st place, gold medalist(s)		Coates, Deakin, Robertson, Wilson, Hallows	Great Britain
2nd place, silver medalist(s)		Eisele, Bonhag, Trube, Dull, Cohn	United States
3rd place, bronze medalist(s)		Fleurac, Fayollat, Lizandier, Bouin, Dréher	France

The men's 3 miles team race was a unique event featured only at the 1908 Summer Olympics in London. In the team race, each competing nation sent five athletes. For each heat, the top three athletes from each nation had their placings counted as part of the team score, though good performances by the other two could also help the team by worsening the scores of other teams. Team scores were arrived at by adding the rankings of the top three runners from the team, with low scores being desirable. Thus, a team that took the first three places in a heat would receive 1+2+3=6 points, the best possible score.

== Records ==
This was the Olympic debut of this event. The world record for the 3 miles individual event at the time was 14:17 3/5.

World record	Alfred Shrubb (GBR)	14:17 3/5	South London	21 May 1903
Olympic record	N/A			

== Results ==
=== First round ===
There were two heats in the first round, with three teams competing in each. The top two teams from each heat advanced to the final.

==== Heat 1 ====
The four British athletes finished the race hand-in-hand; official reports give them a joint first place in the heat though assigning points to the team as if they had placed first through fourth. Thus, Great Britain received 1+2+3=6 points. Neither Italy nor the Netherlands had three men finish the race, and thus they had no score and were unable to advance to the final.

Individual standings

Rank	Name	Nation	Time	Points
1	William Coales	Great Britain	15:05.6	1
1	Joe Deakin	Great Britain	15:05.6	2
1	Archie Robertson	Great Britain	15:05.6	3
1	Harold A. Wilson	Great Britain	15:05.6	–
5	Pericle Pagliani	Italy	15:22.6	5
6	Massimo Cartasegna	Italy	16:26.0	6
7	Arie Vosbergen	Netherlands	17:15.8	7
8	Willem Wakker	Netherlands	17:46.4	8
–	Wilhelmus Braams	Netherlands	DNF	–
–	Dorando Pietri	Italy	DNF	–
–	Emilio Giovanoli	Italy	DNF	–
–	Norman Hallows	Great Britain	DNF	–
–	Emilio Lunghi	Italy	DNF	–

Team standings

Rank	Nation	Athletes	Score		Notes
Rank	Nation	Athletes	Ind.	Team	Notes
1	Great Britain	William Coales	1	6	Q
1	Great Britain	Joe Deakin	2	6	Q
1	Great Britain	Archie Robertson	3	6	Q
–	Italy	Pericle Pagliani	5	–	
–	Italy	Massimo Cartasegna	6	–	
–	Italy	No third finisher	–	–	
–	Netherlands	Arie Vosbergen	7	–	
–	Netherlands	Willem Wakker	8	–	
–	Netherlands	No third finisher	–	–	

==== Heat 2 ====
The United States team finished with 10 points, France had 15, and Sweden had 21. The top six runners finished in proximity, but the fact that three of the runners were American ensured the top spot to the United States.

Individual standings

Rank	Name	Nation	Time	Points
1	Jean Bouin	France	14:53.0	1
2	John Eisele	United States	14:55.0	2
3	Herbert Trube	United States	14:55.0	3
4	Louis Bonniot de Fleurac	France	14:56.0	4
5	George Bonhag	United States	14:56.4	5
6	John Svanberg	Sweden	14:57.0	6
7	Georg Peterson	Sweden	15:14.4	7
8	Edward Dahl	Sweden	15:21.0	8
9	Axel Wiegandt	Sweden	15:33.0	–
10	Joseph Dréher	France	15:37.2	10
11	Gayle Dull	United States	15:37.4	–
12	Seth Landqvist	Sweden	15:46.4	–
13	Alexandre Fayollat	France	15:52.2	–
14	Paul Lizandier	France	15:56.6	–
–	Harvey Cohn	United States	DNS	–

Team standings

Rank	Nation	Athletes	Score		Notes
Rank	Nation	Athletes	Ind.	Team	Notes
1	United States	John Eisele	2	10	Q
1	United States	Herbert Trube	3	10	Q
1	United States	George Bonhag	5	10	Q
2	France	Jean Bouin	1	15	Q
2	France	Louis Bonniot de Fleurac	4	15	Q
2	France	Joseph Dréher	10	15	Q
3	Sweden	John Svanberg	6	21	
3	Sweden	Georg Peterson	7	21	
3	Sweden	Edward Dahl	8	21	

=== Final ===
Individual standings

Rank	Name	Nation	Time	Points
1	Joe Deakin	Great Britain	14:39.6	1
2	Arthur Robertson	Great Britain	14:41.0	2
3	William Coales	Great Britain	14:41.6	3
4	John Eisele	United States	14:41.8	4
5	Harold A. Wilson	Great Britain	14:57.0	–
6	George Bonhag	United States	15:05.0	6
7	Norman Hallows	Great Britain	15:08.0	–
8	Louis Bonniot de Fleurac	France	15:08.4	8
9	Herbert Trube	United States	15:11.0	9
10	Gayle Dull	United States	15:27.0	–
11	Joseph Dréher	France	15:40.0	11
12	Harvey Cohn	United States	15:40.2	–
13	Paul Lizandier	France	16:03.0	13
–	Jean Bouin	France	DNS	–
–	Alexandre Fayollat	France	DNS	–

Team standings

Rank	Nation	Athletes	Score	
Rank	Nation	Athletes	Ind.	Team
1st place, gold medalist(s)	Great Britain	Joe Deakin	1	6
1st place, gold medalist(s)	Great Britain	Arthur Robertson	2	6
1st place, gold medalist(s)	Great Britain	William Coales	3	6
2nd place, silver medalist(s)	United States	John Eisele	4	19
2nd place, silver medalist(s)	United States	George Bonhag	6	19
2nd place, silver medalist(s)	United States	Herbert Trube	9	19
3rd place, bronze medalist(s)	France	Louis Bonniot de Fleurac	8	32
3rd place, bronze medalist(s)	France	Joseph Dréher	11	32
3rd place, bronze medalist(s)	France	Paul Lizandier	13	32
