= 1908 International Cross Country Championships =

- Organisers: ICCU
- Edition: 6th
- Date: 26 March
- Host city: Colombes, Île-de-France, France
- Venue: Stade de Matin
- Events: 1
- Distances: 10 mi (16.1 km)
- Participation: 54 athletes from 5 nations

The 1908 International Cross Country Championships was held in Colombes, France, at the Stade de Matin on 26 March 1908. A report on the event was given in the Glasgow Herald.

Complete results, medalists, and the results of British athletes were published.

== Medalists ==
Event	Gold		Silver		Bronze	
Individual
Men; 10 mi (16.1 km)	Arthur Robertson; England	50:26.8	Fred Neaves; England	50:31	George Pearce; England	50:42
Team
Men	England	24	France	81	Ireland	104

== Individual Race Results ==
=== Men's (10 mi / 16.1 km) ===
Rank	Athlete	Nationality	Time
1st place, gold medalist(s)	Arthur Robertson	England	50:26.8
2nd place, silver medalist(s)	Fred Neaves	England	50:31
3rd place, bronze medalist(s)	George Pearce	England	50:42
4	Gaston Ragueneau	France	50:45
5	William Clarke	England	50:58
6	Joe Deakin	England	51:09
7	Edward Wood	England	51:22
8	James Murphy	Ireland	51:26
9	Marcel Courbaton	France	51:32
10	Sammy Welding	England	51:39
11	Tom Downing	Ireland	51:45
12	Tom Johnston	Scotland	51:52
13	Harry Young	Ireland	52:17
14	Alexandre Fayollat	France	52:31
15	P.J. McGuinness	Ireland	52:32
16	George Rhodes	England	52:43
17	Joseph Dreher	France	52:47
18	R. Staath	France	52:56
19	Victor Millerot	France	52:57
20	Thomas Robertson	Scotland	52:59
21	Jim Kerr	Ireland	53:00
22	Bill Coales	England	53:01
23	Louis Haller	France	53:05
24	John Ranken	Scotland	53:35
25	Pat Melville	Scotland	53:40
26	Billy Day	England	53:42
27	George MacKenzie	Scotland	53:44
28	Thomas Miller	Scotland	53:45
29	J.S. Matthews	Scotland	53:50
30	A. Delmotte	France	53:56
31	Rhys Evans	Wales	53:59
32	Frank Melville	England	53:59
33	Tom Jack	Scotland	54:05
34	Eddie Ace	Wales	54:11
35	Lucien Fremont	France	54:15
36	C.W. Sparkes	Ireland	54:17
37	Tommy Arthur	Wales	54:28
38	Frank Buckley	Ireland	54:51
39	Sam Lee	Ireland	54:59
40	William Bowman	Scotland	55:01
41	J. Cully	Ireland	55:09
42	Paul Lizandier	France	55:15
43	L. Brulé	France	55:17
44	C. Gould	Wales	55:22
45	H. Granger	Wales	55:43
46	Eddie O'Donnell	Wales	56:03
47	T. Bunford	Wales	57:37
48	Ben Christmas	Wales	57:37
49	George Duggan	Ireland	57:50
—	Harry Bennion	England	DNF
—	Jacques Versel	France	DNF
—	J. O'Regan	Ireland	DNF
—	Alex McPhee	Scotland	DNF
—	Sam Stevenson	Scotland	DNF

== Team Results ==
=== Men's ===
Rank	Country	Team	Points
1	England	Arthur Robertson; Fred Neaves; George Pearce; William Clarke; Joe Deakin; Edward Wood	24
2	France	Gaston Ragueneau; Marcel Courbaton; Alexandre Fayollat; Joseph Dreher; R. Staath; Victor Millerot	81
3	Ireland	James Murphy; Tom Downing; Harry Young; P.J. McGuinness; Jim Kerr; C.W. Sparkes	104
4	Scotland	Tom Johnston; Thomas Robertson; John Ranken; Pat Melville; George MacKenzie; Thomas Miller	136
5	Wales	Rhys Evans; Eddie Ace; Tommy Arthur; C. Gould; H. Granger; Eddie O'Donnell	237

== Participation ==
An unofficial count yields the participation of 54 athletes from 5 countries.

- England (12)
- France (12)
- Ireland (11)
- Scotland (11)
- Wales (8)

== See also ==
- 1908 in athletics (track and field)
