= Athletics at the Summer Olympics =

- IOC Code: ATH
- Governing body: World Athletics
- Events: 48 (men: 23; women: 23; mixed: 2)

Summer Olympics
- 1896; 1900; 1904; 1908; 1912; 1920; 1924; 1928; 1932; 1936; 1948; 1952; 1956; 1960; 1964; 1968; 1972; 1976; 1980; 1984; 1988; 1992; 1996; 2000; 2004; 2008; 2012; 2016; 2020; 2024; 2028; 2032
- Medalists; men; women; Records

Athletics has been contested at every Summer Olympics since the birth of the modern Olympic movement at the 1896 Summer Olympics. The athletics program traces its earliest roots to events used in the ancient Greek Olympics. The modern program includes track and field events, road running events, and race walking events. Cross country running was also on the program in earlier editions but it was dropped after the 1924 Summer Olympics.

== Summary ==
Games	Year	Events	Best Nation
1	1896	12	United States (1)
2	1900	23	United States (2)
3	1904	25	United States (3)
4	1908	26	United States (4)
5	1912	30	United States (5)
6			
7	1920	29	United States (6)
8	1924	27	United States (7)
9	1928	27	United States (8)
10	1932	29	United States (9)
11	1936	29	United States (10)
12			
13			
14	1948	33	United States (11)
15	1952	33	United States (12)
16	1956	33	United States (13)
17	1960	34	United States (14)

Games	Year	Events	Best nation
18	1964	36	United States (15)
19	1968	36	United States (16)
20	1972	38	Soviet Union (1)
21	1976	37	East Germany (1)
22	1980	38	Soviet Union (2)
23	1984	41	United States (17)
24	1988	42	United States (18)
25	1992	43	United States (19)
26	1996	44	United States (20)
27	2000	46	United States (21)
28	2004	46	United States (22)
29	2008	47	United States (23)
30	2012	47	United States (24)
31	2016	47	United States (25)
32	2020	48	United States (26)
33	2024	48	United States (27)
34	2028	48	

== Events ==
The events contested have varied widely. From 1900 to 1920, tug of war was considered to be part of the Olympic athletics programme, although the sports of tug of war and athletics are now considered distinct.

Since 2021, the International Olympic Committee (IOC) has also listed the medals from the athletics triathlon event at the 1904 Summer Olympics as part of artistic gymnastics under the designation "Individual All-Around, Field Sports Men".
Nonetheless, this event is included in the medal table below, as this reflects an original IOC sporting classification. However, some sources, such as Olympedia, include these medals in artistic gymnastics, resulting in the United States being credited with an additional gold, silver, and bronze medal in artistic gymnastics rather than in athletics.

=== Men's events ===
No new events have been added to the men's athletics programme since the 1956 addition of the short racewalk. The roster of events has not changed since then, with the exception of the omission of the long racewalk in 1976 (the IAAF held a 50 km walk World Championships that year instead and as a result the event was restored in 1980). The long racewalk is the only event currently held for men but not included on the women's programme, with the exception of women taking part in the heptathlon rather than the decathlon and the 100 metres hurdles rather than the 110 metres hurdles. The last women's event added to the roster was the 3000 metres steeplechase in 2008.

A total of 52 different events have been held in the men's competition. The current list comprises 23 events. Many of the discontinued events were similar to modern ones but at different lengths, especially in the steeplechasing, hurdling, and racewalking disciplines. Team racing events have been eliminated after appearing in six early editions of the Games. The athletic triathlon (an unusual event, held only once and featuring gymnasts competing in the long jump, shot put, and 100 metre dash) and pentathlon multi-discipline events were phased out in favor of the decathlon, and the medley relay replaced with even-leg relays. Standing jump competitions are no longer held, nor are the various modified throwing events which were experimented with in 1908 and 1912. Cross country running was on the program from 1912 to 1924 and is the most prominent form of athletics not to feature at the Olympics.

Current program
Event	96	00	04	08	12	20	24	28	32	36	48	52	56	60	64	68	72	76	80	84	88	92	96	00	04	08	12	16	20	24	28	Years
100 metres	X	X	X	X	X	X	X	X	X	X	X	X	X	X	X	X	X	X	X	X	X	X	X	X	X	X	X	X	X	X	X	31
200 metres	–	X	X	X	X	X	X	X	X	X	X	X	X	X	X	X	X	X	X	X	X	X	X	X	X	X	X	X	X	X	X	30
400 metres	X	X	X	X	X	X	X	X	X	X	X	X	X	X	X	X	X	X	X	X	X	X	X	X	X	X	X	X	X	X	X	31
800 metres	X	X	X	X	X	X	X	X	X	X	X	X	X	X	X	X	X	X	X	X	X	X	X	X	X	X	X	X	X	X	X	31
1500 metres	X	X	X	X	X	X	X	X	X	X	X	X	X	X	X	X	X	X	X	X	X	X	X	X	X	X	X	X	X	X	X	31
5000 metres	–	–	–	–	X	X	X	X	X	X	X	X	X	X	X	X	X	X	X	X	X	X	X	X	X	X	X	X	X	X	X	27
10,000 metres	–	–	–	–	X	X	X	X	X	X	X	X	X	X	X	X	X	X	X	X	X	X	X	X	X	X	X	X	X	X	X	27
Marathon	X	X	X	X	X	X	X	X	X	X	X	X	X	X	X	X	X	X	X	X	X	X	X	X	X	X	X	X	X	X	X	31
Half marathon race walk	–	–	–	–	–	–	–	–	–	–	–	–	–	–	–	–	–	–	–	–	–	–	–	–	–	–	–	–	–	–	X	1
110 metres hurdles	X	X	X	X	X	X	X	X	X	X	X	X	X	X	X	X	X	X	X	X	X	X	X	X	X	X	X	X	X	X	X	31
400 metres hurdles	–	X	X	X	–	X	X	X	X	X	X	X	X	X	X	X	X	X	X	X	X	X	X	X	X	X	X	X	X	X	X	29
3000 metres steeplechase	–	–	–	–	–	X	X	X	X	X	X	X	X	X	X	X	X	X	X	X	X	X	X	X	X	X	X	X	X	X	X	26
4 × 100 metres relay	–	–	–	–	X	X	X	X	X	X	X	X	X	X	X	X	X	X	X	X	X	X	X	X	X	X	X	X	X	X	X	27
4 × 400 metres relay	–	–	–	–	X	X	X	X	X	X	X	X	X	X	X	X	X	X	X	X	X	X	X	X	X	X	X	X	X	X	X	27
High jump	X	X	X	X	X	X	X	X	X	X	X	X	X	X	X	X	X	X	X	X	X	X	X	X	X	X	X	X	X	X	X	31
Pole vault	X	X	X	X	X	X	X	X	X	X	X	X	X	X	X	X	X	X	X	X	X	X	X	X	X	X	X	X	X	X	X	31
Long jump	X	X	X	X	X	X	X	X	X	X	X	X	X	X	X	X	X	X	X	X	X	X	X	X	X	X	X	X	X	X	X	31
Triple jump	X	X	X	X	X	X	X	X	X	X	X	X	X	X	X	X	X	X	X	X	X	X	X	X	X	X	X	X	X	X	X	31
Shot put	X	X	X	X	X	X	X	X	X	X	X	X	X	X	X	X	X	X	X	X	X	X	X	X	X	X	X	X	X	X	X	31
Discus throw	X	X	X	X	X	X	X	X	X	X	X	X	X	X	X	X	X	X	X	X	X	X	X	X	X	X	X	X	X	X	X	31
Hammer throw	–	X	X	X	X	X	X	X	X	X	X	X	X	X	X	X	X	X	X	X	X	X	X	X	X	X	X	X	X	X	X	30
Javelin throw	–	–	–	X	X	X	X	X	X	X	X	X	X	X	X	X	X	X	X	X	X	X	X	X	X	X	X	X	X	X	X	28
Decathlon	–	–	–	–	X	X	X	X	X	X	X	X	X	X	X	X	X	X	X	X	X	X	X	X	X	X	X	X	X	X	X	27
Total	12	15	15	16	20	22	22	22	22	22	22	22	23	23	23	23	23	23	23	23	23	23	23	23	23	23	23	23	23	23	23	

Past events that occurred only once

Only at the 1900 Summer Olympics

- 2500 metres steeplechase
- 4000 metres steeplechase
- 5000 metres team race

Only at the 1904 Summer Olympics

- 2590 metres steeplechase
- 4-mile team race
- All-around
- Triathlon

Only at the 1908 Summer Olympics

- 3200 metres steeplechase
- Medley relay
- 3-mile team race
- 5 miles
- 3500 metres race walk
- 10 miles race walk
- Discus throw, Greek style
- Javelin throw, freestyle

Only at the 1912 Summer Olympics

- Shot put, two hands
- Discus throw, two hands
- Javelin throw, two hands

Only at the 1920 Summer Olympics

- 3000 metres race walk

Past events that occurred twice to five times

- 60 metres: 1900, 1904
- 200 metres hurdles: 1900, 1904
- 3000 metres team race: 1912, 1920, 1924
- 10 kilometres race walk: 1912, 1920, 1924, 1948, 1952
- Pentathlon: 1912, 1920, 1924
- Standing long jump: 1900, 1904, 1908, 1912
- Standing triple jump: 1900, 1904
- Standing high jump: 1900, 1904, 1908, 1912
- 56 pound weight throw: 1904, 1920
- Cross country
  - Individual: 1912, 1920, 1924
  - Team: 1912, 1920, 1924

Past events that occurred twenty or more times
Event	96	00	04	08	12	20	24	28	32	36	48	52	56	60	64	68	72	76	80	84	88	92	96	00	04	08	12	16	20	24	28	Years
20 kilometres race walk	–	–	–	–	–	–	–	–	–	–	–	–	X	X	X	X	X	X	X	X	X	X	X	X	X	X	X	X	X	X	–	18
50 kilometres race walk	–	–	–	–	–	–	–	–	X	X	X	X	X	X	X	X	X	–	X	X	X	X	X	X	X	X	X	X	X	-	-	20

=== Women's events ===
Women's competition in athletics began at the 1928 Summer Olympics.

Current program
Event	28	32	36	48	52	56	60	64	68	72	76	80	84	88	92	96	00	04	08	12	16	20	24	28	Games
100 metres	X	X	X	X	X	X	X	X	X	X	X	X	X	X	X	X	X	X	X	X	X	X	X	X	24
200 metres	–	–	–	X	X	X	X	X	X	X	X	X	X	X	X	X	X	X	X	X	X	X	X	X	21
400 metres	–	–	–	–	–	–	–	X	X	X	X	X	X	X	X	X	X	X	X	X	X	X	X	X	16
800 metres	X	–	–	–	–	–	X	X	X	X	X	X	X	X	X	X	X	X	X	X	X	X	X	X	19
1500 metres	–	–	–	–	–	–	–	–	–	X	X	X	X	X	X	X	X	X	X	X	X	X	X	X	15
5000 metres	–	–	–	–	–	–	–	–	–	–	–	–	–	–	–	X	X	X	X	X	X	X	X	X	9
10,000 metres	–	–	–	–	–	–	–	–	–	–	–	–	–	X	X	X	X	X	X	X	X	X	X	X	11
Marathon	–	–	–	–	–	–	–	–	–	–	–	–	X	X	X	X	X	X	X	X	X	X	X	X	12
Half marathon race walk	–	–	–	–	–	–	–	–	–	–	–	–	–	–	–	–	–	–	–	–	–	–	–	X	1
100 metres hurdles	–	–	–	–	–	–	–	–	–	X	X	X	X	X	X	X	X	X	X	X	X	X	X	X	15
400 metres hurdles	–	–	–	–	–	–	–	–	–	–	–	–	X	X	X	X	X	X	X	X	X	X	X	X	12
3000 metres steeplechase	–	–	–	–	–	–	–	–	–	–	–	–	–	–	–	–	–	–	X	X	X	X	X	X	6
4 × 100 metres relay	X	X	X	X	X	X	X	X	X	X	X	X	X	X	X	X	X	X	X	X	X	X	X	X	24
4 × 400 metres relay	–	–	–	–	–	–	–	–	–	X	X	X	X	X	X	X	X	X	X	X	X	X	X	X	15
High jump	X	X	X	X	X	X	X	X	X	X	X	X	X	X	X	X	X	X	X	X	X	X	X	X	24
Pole vault	–	–	–	–	–	–	–	–	–	–	–	–	–	–	–	–	X	X	X	X	X	X	X	X	8
Long jump	–	–	–	X	X	X	X	X	X	X	X	X	X	X	X	X	X	X	X	X	X	X	X	X	21
Triple jump	–	–	–	–	–	–	–	–	–	–	–	–	–	–	–	X	X	X	X	X	X	X	X	X	9
Shot put	–	–	–	X	X	X	X	X	X	X	X	X	X	X	X	X	X	X	X	X	X	X	X	X	21
Discus throw	X	X	X	X	X	X	X	X	X	X	X	X	X	X	X	X	X	X	X	X	X	X	X	X	24
Hammer throw	–	–	–	–	–	–	–	–	–	–	–	–	–	–	–	–	X	X	X	X	X	X	X	X	8
Javelin throw	–	X	X	X	X	X	X	X	X	X	X	X	X	X	X	X	X	X	X	X	X	X	X	X	23
Heptathlon	–	–	–	–	–	–	–	–	–	–	–	–	X	X	X	X	X	X	X	X	X	X	X	X	12

Past events
Event	28	32	36	48	52	56	60	64	68	72	76	80	84	88	92	96	00	04	08	12	16	20	24	28	Games
80 metres hurdles	–	X	X	X	X	X	X	X	X	–	–	–	–	–	–	–	–	–	–	–	–	–	–	–	8
Pentathlon	–	–	–	–	–	–	–	X	X	X	X	X	–	–	–	–	–	–	–	–	–	–	–	–	5
3000 metres	–	–	–	–	–	–	–	–	–	–	–	–	X	X	X	–	–	–	–	–	–	–	–	–	3
10 kilometres race walk	–	–	–	–	–	–	–	–	–	–	–	–	–	–	X	X	–	–	–	–	–	–	–	–	2
20 kilometres race walk	–	–	–	–	–	–	–	–	–	–	–	–	–	–	–	–	X	X	X	X	X	X	X	–	7
Total	5	6	6	9	9	9	10	12	12	14	14	14	17	18	19	20	22	22	23	23	23	23	23	23	

=== Mixed events ===
The mixed event, a 4 × 400 metres relay, first made an appearance at the 2020 Summer Olympics. The event includes teams of four athletes, two men and two women who run in the order man–woman–man–woman (before 2022, each team was allowed to decide the running order individually). Paris 2024 featured another mixed team event: the Marathon Race Walking Mixed Relay, which includes teams of two athletes, one male and one female. Another mixed event called 4 × 100 metres relay was added to the Athletics programme by IOC in 2025 and is scheduled to debut at the 2028 Olympic Games in Los Angeles.

Current program
Event	20	24	28	Games
4 × 100 metres relay	–	–	X	1
4 × 400 metres relay	X	X	X	3
Marathon race walk mixed relay	–	X	–	1
Total	1	2	2	

== Nations ==
Every nation that has competed at the Olympics has entered the athletics competition. The numbers below represent how many athletes each nation sent that year, starting with 1896.

NOTE: This table is a work in progress. The empty boxes in the 2016, 2020, and 2024 columns do not necessarily mean that the country did not send athletes that year.

Nation	96	00	04	08	12	20	24	28	32	36	48	52	56	60	64	68	72	76	80	84	88	92	96	00	04	08	12	16	20	24	Years
Afghanistan										2				5									2		2	2	2	2	2	2	9
Albania																						1	2	2	2	2	1	2	2	2	9
Algeria																	4		9	9	12	9	8	21	20	12	6	15	5	8	13
American Samoa																					1		2	2	2	1	1	2	1	1	9
Andorra																					1	1	1	2	2	2	2	1	1	1	10
Angola																			3		6	5	2	2	1	1	2	2	1	1	11
Antigua and Barbuda																		8		10	10	5	8	2	3	4	3	7	2	2	12
Argentina							10	7	11	8	24	16	2	4	6	6	9	2		7	2	4	8	11	8	11	9	13	5	6	23
Armenia																							2	3	2	2	4	5	1	1	8
Aruba																					2	2	1	2	1						5
Australasia				9	5																										2
Australia	1	1	2			4	9	7	4	5	18	17	76	28	35	24	22	27	21	30	28	35	60	82	42	40	50	59	63	75	28
Austria		1		2	12		7	4	2	29	15	15	3	9	8	12	15	6	11	6	10	16	11	12	6	3	7	6	7	7	27
Azerbaijan																							4	4	4	2	3	4	2	1	8
Bahamas													1	2	3	8	8	8		14	11	8	20	19	16	18	20	24	13	16	17
Bahrain																				1	3	6	1	2	6	11	9	26	14	8	11
Bangladesh																				1	4	4	2	2	1	2	1	2	1	1	11
Barbados																2	7	9		9	6	8	4	11	3	3	4	6	6	2	14
Belarus																							34	31	41	47	44	36	30		7
Belgium				6	2	42	17	32		13	18	21	6	12	10	15	15	25	19	15	13	7	12	9	9	17	14	26	29	43	26
Belize																2		2		4	5	5	4	2	2	3	2	2	2	1	13
Benin																	1		9		6	4	5	2	2	2	2	2	3	2	12
Bermuda											6	2				2		8		4	5	4	3	1	1	2	2	2		1	14
Bohemia		4		3	11																										3
Bolivia																	4	1		3	2	6	3	2	2	2	2	6	2	2	13
Bosnia and Herzegovina																						4	2	4	2	2	2	5	2	1	9
Botswana																			7	6	6	5	6	6	9	7	3	9	9	10	12
Brazil							8		19	10	12	10	6	5	1	3	2	8	11	20	20	24	40	18	34	41	30	67	53	44	23
British Virgin Islands																				4	2	1	6	1	1	2	2	3	2	3	11
British West Indies														7																	1
Brunei																								1	1		2	2	1	1	6
Bulgaria							4			2		4		8	9	9	18	19	47		22	21	17	22	19	15	8	11	5	5	19
Burkina Faso																	1				4	3	4	2	3	2	2	2	2	2	11
Burundi																							7	6	5	2	3	6	3	4	8
Cameroon															1	1	4		4	9	5	7	8	11	7	5	2	2	1	2	15
Cambodia																	4						2	2	2	2	2	2	1	1	9
Canada		4	6	27	18	14	27	32	29	28	27	22	18	16	16	27	32	55		61	63	48	39	36	21	29	42	66	57	48	28
Cape Verde																							3	2	1	1	2	2	1	1	8
Cayman Islands																					2	1	1	2	2	2	2	2	2	1	10
Central African Republic																1				1	1	8	5	2	2	2	2	2	1	1	12
Chad															2	3	3			3	6	4	4	2	1	2	1	2	1	1	14
Chile					6	2	3	8		10	15	15	6	4	3	8	2	1		6	5	3	4	7	3	6	8	10	3	9	24
China									1	22	3									22	44	33	31	26	52	66	51	56	50	54	14
Chinese Taipei													4	6	5	11	7			10	12	2	7	2	2	3	6	6	6	4	16
Colombia									1	5	2		4		4	4	7	7	4	5	8	5	13	11	11	14	29	34	26	18	20
Comoros																							4	2	2	2	2	2	2	1	8
Republic of the Congo															2		6		6	6	7	6	2	2	1	2	2	2	1	1	14
Democratic Republic of the Congo																				2	6	7	2	2	2	2	2	2	1	1	11
Cook Islands																					2	1	1	1	2	2	2	2	1	1	10
Costa Rica																2	1			3	4	8	2	1		3	4	3	3	1	12
Croatia																						2	3	15	12	10	9	10	7	9	9
Cuba			1					1			3	5	2	3	3	18	19	26	17			34	46	33	33	43	46	43	18	18	20
Cyprus																				3	4	5	8	10	7	6	4	7	3	3	11
Czech Republic																							23	24	36	29	31	26	26	30	11
Czechoslovakia						16	18	11	3	31	11	20	16	22	12	13	27	14	22		23	18									16
Denmark	3	4		8	14	18	9	10	2	10	16	11	2	9	4	6	13	3	2	3	5	3	7	4	5	3	6	8	13	4	29
Djibouti																				3	5	5	3	2		2	2	5	3	4	10
Dominica																							5	2	2	2	2	2	2	2	8
Dominican Republic															1	9		2	2	4	3		3	2	5	6	9	13	7	9	14
East Germany																47	62	58	82		58										5
Timor-Leste																									2	1	2	2	1	1	8
Ecuador							3									1			1	3	5	7	4	3	8	11	13	16	17	15	14
Egypt						2	1			4	2	7					1			7	4			2	2	4	6	4	4	6	15
Eritrea																								3	4	10	11	10	9	8	7
Equatorial Guinea																				4	6	7	5	2	2	2	2	2	2	2	11
El Salvador																10				4	2	2	2	2	2	2	2	2	1		11
Estonia						7	11	4	1	7												5	13	5	15	14	10	18	7	5	14
Ethiopia													8	5	5	9	20		25			15	16	24	24	27	31	35	33	32	15
Federated States of Micronesia																								2	2	2	2	2	1	1	7
Fiji													1	2		1	2	2		4	8	7	7	1	2	2	2	2	1	1	16
Finland				15	23	26	52	35	22	37	36	69	19	26	17	10	32	31	26	22	18	26	26	23	23	19	17	16	21	25	27
France	5	21	(1)	19	25	59	70	50	12	40	65	54	29	36	38	40	49	44	31	43	55	57	49	53	55	48	47	54	65	90	30
Gabon																				2	1	2	4	2	2	2	2	2	1	1	11
The Gambia																				10	3	5	9	2	2	2	2	2	2	3	11
Georgia																							2	2	3	2	4	5	5	1	8
Germany	5	6	2	20	24			62	27	77		39										79	85	64	71	53	71	71	90	79	18
Ghana												7		7	12	8	13			15	11	8	15	18	10	3	2	9	7	5	16
Great Britain	5	9	3	126	61	41	65	55	24	52	79	66	55	61	62	68	70	52	61	85	102	91	77	72	54	58	69	80	77	63	30
Greece	30	2	10	12	5	9	12	13	7	14	15	11	6	19	5	7	12	12	8	10	6	11	25	43	56	32	23	25	20	13	30
Grenada																				2	2	4	5	2	3	8	6	5	4	4	11
Guam																					6	2	2	2	2	2	2	2	1	1	10
Guatemala												6				5	3			7	1		6	7	5	4	6	9	9	5	13
Guinea																			3		2	5	4	2	1	2	2	2	1	1	11
Guinea-Bissau																							2	2	2	2	2	2	1	1	8
Guyana											1		2	4		1			2	4	3	3	6	4	2	3	3	4	3	2	16
Haiti							3	2	2								7	10		1	3	2	3	3	4	4	4	3	1	2	16
Honduras																6		3		3	3	4	1	1	1	2	2	1	1	1	13
Hong Kong															4					3	3	3	1	5	1	2	5	2	2	1	12
Hungary	3	9	2	19	27		16	26	5	25	12	35	19	26	31	31	33	16	27		15	24	22	37	35	20	18	19	18	18	28
Iceland					1					4	11	9	2	7	2	3	4	7	4	7	7	4	3	6	2	3	3	3	1	1	22
India		1				3	7	7	4	4	8	8	8	11	13	2	8	4	11	8	5	2	6	24	17	14	14	34	26	27	26
Independent Olympic Participants																						9		2			2				3
Indonesia												1	3	1			1	1		5	5		1	5	2	2	2	2	2	1	15
Iran												1	2	1	8	1	3	4			1	2	1	1	2	6	10	10	3	2	17
Iraq											2			11	4				6		2		1	2	2	2	2		1	1	12
Ireland							10	10	4		10	2	3	9	7	5	13	7	7	17	18	19	24	32	11	16	21	16	27	25	23
Israel												7	1	8	5	2	2			6		4	4	8	5	4	3	8	9	6	16
Italy		2		12	12	24	36	24	21	32	25	33	21	47	22	26	40	32	26	51	38	39	50	47	35	45	33	38	76	76	28
Ivory Coast															6	7	6	8		6	9	9	5	8	2	1	3	4	3	6	15
Jamaica											10	7	6		15	15	21	14	16	32	26	28	38	43	41	45	42	59	57	57	19
Japan					2	11	8	16	34	46		19	20	20	64	19	19	15		22	29	31	32	40	38	37	44	56	65	51	24
Jordan																				5		2	2	2	2	2	2	1	1	1	10
Kazakhstan																							18	25	21	19	24	23	9	7	8
Kenya													8	5	11	18	22			32	33	38	43	36	31	37	42	50	40	45	16
Kiribati																									2	1	2	2	1	1	6
Kuwait																2	2	6	8	2	6	4	1	4	5	2	3		2	2	14
Kyrgyzstan																							6	8	7	5	2	5	2	1	8
Laos																			7		1	5	5	2	2	2	2	2	1	1	11
Latvia							10	6	2	7												7	16	17	15	16	22	15	8	8	13
Lebanon														1			2	1	2	3	3	1		2	2	2	2	2	1	1	14
Lesotho																	1		5	2	3	6	9	2	2	4	3	5	2	2	13
Liberia													4	4	1		5			7	4		5	8	2	3	3	2	3	7	14
Libya																1			7		2	1	4	1	2	2	2	1	1	1	12
Liechtenstein										2	2			2	2	2		3		3	3	2	1			1	1				12
Lithuania								5														8	14	18	12	18	20	17	11	11	10
Luxembourg					2	6	3	4		6	6	7	3	6	3	1	1	3	1	1	3		1		1			2	2	4	21
North Macedonia																								2	2	2	2	2	1	1	7
Madagascar															3	3	7		3	2		5	6	7	3	2	2	2	1	2	14
Malawi																	11			5	5	4	2	2	2	2	2	2	1	1	12
Malaysia													7	3																	2
Malaysia															12	10	8	3		2	2	1	3	2	2	3	2	2	2	1	15
Maldives																					7	5	5	2	2	2	2	2	1	1	10
Mali															2	1	1		3	2	3	3	3	2	2	2	2	2	2	1	15
Malta										2	1									1		2	2	2	2	2	2	2	1	1	12
Marshall Islands																										2	2	2		1	4
Mauritius																				4	3	3	12	6	4	3	2	3	1	2	11
Mauritania																					2	6	4	2	2	2	2	2	2	1	10
Mexico							11	11	25	3	5	2	1	5	5	26	11	7	7	16	21	24	15	22	27	23	18	20	20	18	24
Moldova																							7	11	12	14	8	9	6	5	8
Monaco						2	1	1													1				1	1	1	1	1	1	10
Montenegro																										2	2	2	2	1	5
Mongolia															3	1	1					1	2	2	2	2	2	5	3	3	12
Morocco														8	4	4	8			3	11	13	17	24	22	26	21	18	16	13	15
Mozambique																			9	7	3	3	1	2	2	1	2	1	1	1	12
Myanmar											1		1	1	2	2	2		1		2	3	2	2		2	2	2			14
Namibia																						3	3	6	3	4	3	4	4	1	9
Nepal															2		2	1	5	5	7	1	2	2	2	2	2	2	1	1	15
Netherlands				19	1	11	20	50	7	18	22	10		10	8	12	7	5	9	13	18	15	10	9	20	14	18	32	43	40	26
Netherlands Antilles																		2		3		1	1	2	2	1					7
New Zealand						2	1	3	6	3	3	4	9	14	14	9	16	10		14	6	13	18	8	13	10	8	14	13	17	24
Nicaragua																7	5	5	2			1	2	1	2	2	2	1	1	1	16
Niger																				2	3	3	3	2	2	2	2	2	2	1	11
Nigeria												9	10	8	14	15	19		16	17	23	14	32	28	17	22	21	25	14	36	18
North Borneo													2																		1
North Korea																	2	3	3			3	4	6	4	6	5	4		1	11
North Yemen																				2	4										2
Norway		2		11	21	16	10	13	3	11	20	19	5	11	6	5	13	10		13	12	9	13	12	9	9	11	15	15	25	27
Oman																				7	5	4	1	4	1	2	2	2	2	2	11
Pakistan											5	16	19	12	6		5	2		3	7	4	2	2	2	2	2	2	2	2	19
Palau																								2	2	2	2	1	1	1	7
Palestine																							1	1	2	2	2	2	1	2	8
Panama											1			4	4		1	1		2		1	1	1	2	2	3	3	4	2	15
Papua New Guinea																		3		5	6	6	6	2	2	2	2	2	1	1	12
Paraguay																	2	1		5	3	3	2	2	2	2	2	2	2	2	13
Peru										9	9				3	4	3	1	5	2	1	2	5	2	2	3	5	14	8	9	18
Philippines							1	2	1	6	1	1	4	7	11	4	6	1		6	4	3	2	2	2	2	2	3	2	3	23
Poland							14	15	7	17	7	29	23	49	35	31	45	32	48		21	24	23	35	45	60	52	70	63	58	23
Portugal					3		3	3	1	2	4	7		5	3	1	6	6	3	14	28	36	30	21	26	27	24	26	20	22	24
Puerto Rico											4	10	7	7	6	6	9	10		14	5	7	5	8	3	5	10	12	4	8	19
Qatar																				6	8	11	9	12	10	14	6	8	8	7	11
Rhodesia														2	3																2
Russia				1	32																		85	109	115	104	97	1			8
ROC																													1		1
Romania								13		5		12	5	9	12	11	18	16	21	9	5	25	25	23	26	17	17	22	10	12	21
Rwanda																				3	6	7	4	3	3	2	3	3	2	2	11
Saar												6																			1
Saint Kitts and Nevis																							10	2	2	4	4	7	2	2	8
Saint Lucia																							5	3	1	3	2	3	1	2	8
Saint Vincent and the Grenadines																					6	6	8	2	2	2	2	2	1	2	10
Samoa																				2	1		2		2	2	1	2	1	1	9
San Marino																		2	1	2	2	5	1	1	1	1	1	1		1	12
São Tomé and Príncipe																							2	2	2	2	2	2	1	1	8
Saudi Arabia																	10	14			6	2	9	11	7	8	10	6	2	2	12
Senegal															12	9	12	10	10	11	12	9	7	9	9	2	6				13
Serbia					2																					10	14				3
Serbia and Montenegro																							8	24	7						3
Seychelles																			9	5		4	2	2	2	2	2				9
Sierra Leone																2			12	5	8	11	12	2	2	2	2				10
Singapore											1	1	4			1	3	1					2		2	2	2				10
Slovakia																							14	16	12	18	11				5
Slovenia																						4	10	19	19	17	12				8
Solomon Islands																				2	1		3	2	2	2	2				7
Somalia																	3			7	5		4	2	2	2	2				8
South Africa			3	6	7	13	12	9	4	14	6	13	9	7								16	22	23	32	23	20				18
South Korea											9	6	7	6	17	4	2			11	47	11	17	13	18	17	17				15
South Vietnam												1			2	1															3
South Yemen																					3										1
Soviet Union												77	75	81	84	70	74	70	99		83										9
Spain						14	13	10			7			13	6	10	11	17	21	26	34	59	56	58	56	54	46				18
Sri Lanka											3	1	1	1	1	1	3		4		2	7	6	13	4	2	2				15
Suriname																1	1	2		2	3	2	2	2	2	2	2				11
Sudan														2		2	6			3	3	3	3	2	4	8	4				11
Swaziland																	1			3	5	5	4	2	2	2	2				9
Sweden	1	8		31	106	64	33	29	9	37	50	45	17	26	16	18	26	19	16	24	11	19	17	14	12	12	9				26
Switzerland				1	1	13	17	9	3	19	20	28		21	12	22	28	7	15	17	19	15	23	13	9	7	11				23
Syria																	1		12		1	3	1	3	2	2	2				9
Tajikistan																							1	2	2	2	2				5
Tanzania															4	3	7		16	12	6	4	5	4	8	7	3				12
Thailand												8	8	8	18		4	4		10	4	18	8	12	3	11	2				14
Togo																	2			3	3	4	5	2	2	1	2				9
Tonga																					2	4	2	2	2	2	2				7
Trinidad and Tobago											3		3		6	8	10	10	9	11	3	5	6	15	14	23	20				15
Tunisia														11	6	3	4			2	2	1	6	9	3	4	5				12
Turkey					2		4	5			13	13		13	4	4	3	2		5	4	2	3	5	13	15	31				18
Turkmenistan																							1	2	2	2	2				5
Tuvalu																										2	2				2
Uganda													3	4	8	3	8		6	10	13	4	4	5	4	7	11				14
Ukraine																							43	54	50	66	73				5
Unified Team																						99									1
United Team of Germany													43	90	97																3
United Arab Emirates																				7		4	1	1	1	1	2	3	1	1	10
United Arab Republic														2																	1
United States	10	41	86	84	109	90	96	98	82	77	76	71	81	81	86	91	95	92		110	114	117	121	116	116	121	125	128	128	120	29
Uruguay											5	2	1	1		3	2	1			1	2	2	4	3	3	2	6	3	3	17
Uzbekistan																							12	22	10	12	13	16	7	4	8
Vanuatu																					3	6	4	2	2	2	2			1	8
Venezuela												7	4	7	6	6	10	1	1	3			4	6	5	4	12	15	4	6	17
Vietnam																			7		2	4	2	2	2	2	2	2	1	1	11
Virgin Islands																2	1	3		4	7	10	7	3	2	2	4	3	1	1	14
West Germany																67	87	54		58	47										5
Yemen																						3	3	2	1	2	2	1	1	1	9
Yugoslavia							5	4	1	21	15	19	7	22	9	8	16	13	14	6	10										15
Zambia															5	3	7		9	4	4	4	4	4	2	2	3	3	2	4	15
Zimbabwe															3				4	6	7	7	6	8	6	7	3	6	1	4	13
No. of nations	10	15	10	20	27	25	40	40	34	43	53	57	59	72	80	92	104	79	70	124	148	156	190	193	196	200	201	201	196	200	
Year	96	00	04	08	12	20	24	28	32	36	48	52	56	60	64	68	72	76	80	84	88	92	96	00	04	08	12	16	20	24	

== Medal table ==
Updated after the 2024 Summer Olympics, considering stripped medals and reallocated medals as of June 2026.

Rank	Nation	Gold	Silver	Bronze	Total
1	United States	359	282	226	867
2	Soviet Union	64	55	74	193
3	Great Britain	57	87	77	221
4	Finland	48	36	30	114
5	Kenya	38	44	35	117
6	East Germany	38	36	35	109
7	Poland	29	20	18	67
8	Jamaica	27	39	27	93
9	Italy	24	16	28	68
10	Ethiopia	24	16	22	62
11	Australia	22	29	32	83
12	Sweden	21	23	41	85
13	Germany	20	30	37	87
14	Canada	18	19	32	69
15	Russia	18	19	19	56
16	France	14	27	30	71
17	West Germany	12	14	17	43
18	China	12	13	18	43
19	Cuba	11	14	20	45
20	Romania	11	14	10	35
21	Czechoslovakia	11	8	5	24
22	New Zealand	11	4	13	28
23	Hungary	10	13	18	41
24	Netherlands	10	8	12	30
25	Norway	10	8	8	26
26	South Africa	9	15	6	30
27	Greece	9	12	11	32
28	Japan	8	10	10	28
29	Morocco	8	5	8	21
30	Unified Team	7	11	3	21
31	Belgium	7	6	4	17
32	Bahamas	7	2	5	14
33	Bulgaria	5	8	6	19
34	Spain	5	6	9	20
35	Brazil	5	4	12	21
36	Portugal	5	4	4	13
37	Czech Republic	5	3	8	16
38	Uganda	5	2	2	9
39	United Team of Germany	4	18	8	30
40	Algeria	4	3	3	10
41	Ireland	4	2	1	7
42	Mexico	3	6	2	11
43	Belarus	3	5	7	15
44	Trinidad and Tobago	3	4	8	15
45	Ukraine	3	3	15	21
46	Bahrain	3	3	0	6
46	Dominican Republic	3	3	0	6
48	Lithuania	3	2	2	7
49	Croatia	3	1	2	6
50	Nigeria	2	5	7	14
51	Argentina	2	3	0	5
52	Tunisia	2	2	1	5
53	Ecuador	2	2	0	4
54	Estonia	2	1	3	6
55	Kazakhstan	2	1	2	5
56	Cameroon	2	0	0	2
57	Colombia	1	3	1	5
58	India	1	3	0	4
59	Austria	1	2	5	8
60	Qatar	1	2	2	5
61	Botswana	1	2	1	4
61	Slovenia	1	2	1	4
63	Grenada	1	1	3	5
64	Venezuela	1	1	1	3
65	Burundi	1	1	0	2
65	ROC (ROC)	1	1	0	2
65	Saint Lucia	1	1	0	2
65	South Korea	1	1	0	2
69	Panama	1	0	2	3
69	Puerto Rico	1	0	2	3
71	Mozambique	1	0	1	2
72	Dominica	1	0	0	1
72	Luxembourg	1	0	0	1
72	Pakistan	1	0	0	1
72	Slovakia	1	0	0	1
72	Syria	1	0	0	1
72	Tajikistan	1	0	0	1
78	Switzerland	0	6	2	8
79	Namibia	0	5	0	5
80	Denmark	0	4	3	7
81	Latvia	0	4	1	5
82	Chile	0	2	0	2
82	Sri Lanka	0	2	0	2
82	Tanzania	0	2	0	2
82	Yugoslavia	0	2	0	2
86	Chinese Taipei	0	1	1	2
86	Iceland	0	1	1	2
86	Zambia	0	1	1	2
89	Bohemia	0	1	0	1
89	Guatemala	0	1	0	1
89	Haiti	0	1	0	1
89	Iran	0	1	0	1
89	Ivory Coast	0	1	0	1
89	Saudi Arabia	0	1	0	1
89	Senegal	0	1	0	1
89	Sudan	0	1	0	1
97	British West Indies	0	0	2	2
97	Philippines	0	0	2	2
97	Turkey	0	0	2	2
100	Australasia	0	0	1	1
100	Barbados	0	0	1	1
100	Burkina Faso	0	0	1	1
100	Djibouti	0	0	1	1
100	Eritrea	0	0	1	1
100	Serbia	0	0	1	1
Totals (105 entries)		1,075	1,084	1,073	3,232

== See also ==
- Athletics at the Summer Paralympics
- Athletics at the Youth Olympic Games
