= Francis Knott =

British athlete

Personal information
- Born: 11 August 1882 Haringey, England
- Died: 24 March 1958 (aged 75) Worthing, England

Sport
- Sport: Athletics
- Event: middle-distance
- Club: South London Harriers

Francis Arthur Knott (11 August 1882 – 24 March 1958) was a British middle-distance running athlete. He competed in the 1908 Summer Olympics in London.

== Biography ==
Knott, born in Haringey, was a member of the South London Harriers and finished third behind Harold Wilson in the 1 mile event at the 1908 AAA Championships.

Knott represented Great Britain at the 1908 Summer Olympics and competed in the 1500 metres, where he placed fourth in his initial semifinal heat and did not advance to the final.

== Sources ==
- Francis Knott's profile at Sports Reference.com
- Cook, Theodore Andrea (1908). The Fourth Olympiad, Being the Official Report. London: British Olympic Association.
- De Wael, Herman (2001). "Athletics 1908". Herman's Full Olympians. Archived from the original on 27 September 2006.
- Wudarski, Pawel (1999). "Wyniki Igrzysk Olimpijskich" (in Polish). Archived from the original on 16 February 2009.
- Francis Knott at World Athletics
- Francis Knott at Olympics.com
- Francis Knott at Olympedia
