= 1905 International Cross Country Championships =

- Organisers: ICCU
- Edition: 3rd
- Date: 25 March
- Host city: Dublin, Leinster, Ireland
- Venue: Baldoyle Racecourse
- Events: 1
- Distances: 8 mi (12.9 km)
- Participation: 48 athletes from 4 nations

The 1905 International Cross Country Championships was held in Dublin, Ireland, at the Baldoyle Racecourse on 25 March 1905. A report on the event was given in the Glasgow Herald.

Complete results, medalists, and the results of British athletes were published.

== Medalists ==
Event	Gold		Silver		Bronze	
Individual
Men; 8 mi (12.9 km)	Albert Aldridge; England	40:20	Tom Hynes; Ireland	40:35	Joe Deakin; England	41:14
Team
Men	England	28	Scotland	82	Ireland	97

== Individual Race Results ==
=== Men's (8 mi / 12.9 km) ===
Rank	Athlete	Nationality	Time
1st place, gold medalist(s)	Albert Aldridge	England	40:20
2nd place, silver medalist(s)	Tom Hynes	Ireland	40:35
3rd place, bronze medalist(s)	Joe Deakin	England	41:14
4	William Pickup	England	41:33
5	W.G. Dunkley	England	41:37
6	Sam Stevenson	Scotland	41:58
7	Sammy Welding	England	42:03
8	George Pearce	England	42:09
9	Eddie Francis	Wales	42:21
10	Hugh Muldoon	Ireland	42:22
11	Tom Johnston	Scotland	42:25
12	John Ranken	Scotland	42:26
13	T. Hughes	Wales	42:33
14	Peter Russell	Scotland	42:34
15	Frederick Hulford	England	42:35
16	George MacKenzie	Scotland	42:38
17	James Hosker	England	42:39
18	P.J. Whyte	Ireland	42:40
19	Billy Day	England	42:41
20	Harry Cleaver	Wales	42:52
21	J.J. Doyle	Ireland	42:56
22	Will Delaney	Ireland	42:59
23	Sam Elliot	Scotland	43:00
24	Michael McDonagh	Ireland	43:14
25	Tommy Arthur	Wales	43:20
26	Paul Kelly	Ireland	43:21
27	Sam Kennedy	Scotland	43:28
28	W. Francis	Wales	43:41
29	J. Burke	Ireland	43:42
30	Ernest Thomas	Wales	43:47
31	Charlie Harris	Ireland	43:55
32	Eddie Ace	Wales	44:06
33	L.J. Donelan	Ireland	44:08
34	Robert Davies	Wales	44:27
35	Thomas Robertson	Scotland	44:28
36	George Arnot	Scotland	44:32
37	Thomas Young	Scotland	44:48
38	T.T. Wynn	Wales	45:05
39	H.T. Johnstone	Wales	45:18
—	Arthur Ashby	England	DNF
—	Fred Neaves	England	DNF
—	George Whiston	England	DNF
—	John Daly	Ireland	DNF
—	Tom Hamilton	Ireland	DNF
—	Thomas Mulrine	Scotland	DNF
—	James Sommerville	Scotland	DNF
—	Eddie O'Donnell	Wales	DNF
—	Edgar Price	Wales	DNF

== Team Results ==
=== Men's ===
Rank	Country	Team	Points
1	England	Albert Aldridge; Joe Deakin; William Pickup; W.G. Dunkley; Sammy Welding; George Pearce	28
2	Scotland	Sam Stevenson; Tom Johnston; John Ranken; Peter Russell; George MacKenzie; Sam Elliot	82
3	Ireland	Tom Hynes; Hugh Muldoon; P.J. Whyte; J.J. Doyle; Will Delaney; Michael McDonagh	97
4	Wales	Eddie Francis; T. Hughes; Harry Cleaver; Tommy Arthur; W. Francis; Ernest Thomas	125

== Participation ==
An unofficial count yields the participation of 48 athletes from 4 countries.

- England (12)
- Ireland (12)
- Scotland (12)
- Wales (12)

== See also ==
- 1905 in athletics (track and field)
