= Arno Hesse =

German middle-distance runner

Arno Hesse (born 1887, date of death unknown) was a German athlete. He competed in the 1908 Summer Olympics in London. In the 1500 metres, Hesse placed seventh and last in his initial semifinal heat and did not advance to the final.

== Sources ==
- Cook, Theodore Andrea (1908). The Fourth Olympiad, Being the Official Report. London: British Olympic Association.
- De Wael, Herman (2001). "Athletics 1908". Herman's Full Olympians. Archived from the original on 27 September 2006.
- Wudarski, Pawel (1999). "Wyniki Igrzysk Olimpijskich" (in Polish). Archived from the original on 16 February 2009.
- Arno Hesse at World Athletics
- Arno Hesse at Olympedia
