= Axel Andersson =

Swedish athlete

E. Axel Andersson (19 June 1887 – 17 August 1951) was a Swedish athlete. He competed at the 1908 Summer Olympics in London. In the 1500 metres, Andersson placed sixth of seven in his initial semifinal heat and did not advance to the final.

== Sources ==
- Cook, Theodore Andrea (1908). The Fourth Olympiad, Being the Official Report. London: British Olympic Association.
- De Wael, Herman (2001). "Athletics 1908". Herman's Full Olympians. Archived from the original on 27 September 2006.
- Wudarski, Pawel (1999). "Wyniki Igrzysk Olimpijskich" (in Polish).
