= Emilio Giovanoli =

Italian long-distance runner

Personal information
- Nationality: Italian
- Born: 1886
- Died: unknown

Sport
- Country: Italy
- Sport: Athletics
- Event: Long-distance running

Emilio Giovanoli (1886 – date of death unknown) was an Italian long-distance runner who competed in the men's 3 miles team race at the 1908 Summer Olympics.
