= Charles Swain (athlete) =

Australian athlete

Personal information
- Born: 16 January 1885 Brisbane, Australia
- Died: 9 February 1974 (aged 89) Brisbane, Australia

Sport
- Country: Australia
- Sport: Track and field
- Club: Toowong Harriers, Toowong, Brisbane

Charles Edward Swain (16 January 1885 – 9 February 1974) was an Australian athlete. He competed in the 1908 Summer Olympics in London on the Australasia team, a combined squad of competitors from Australia and New Zealand.

Born in Brisbane, Swain participated in the 1500 metres at the 1908 Summer Olympics held in London. He was drawn in a heat with five other runners, but Swain was one of the four athletes who did not finish the race and qualify for the final.

Swain was a member of the Toowong Harriers in Brisbane, and his best race at the National Track and Field events came in the 1909–10 season when he was runner-up in the 880-yard race.
