= Edward Dahl =

Swedish athlete

Medal record

Men's athletics

Representing Sweden

Intercalated Games
Bronze medal – third place	1906 Athens	5 miles

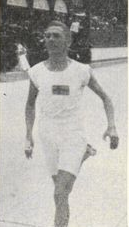
Edward Dahl.png

Edward Martin Dahl (3 August 1886, in Bromma – 21 November 1961) was a Swedish athlete. He competed in the 1906 Intercalated Games in Athens and in the 1908 Summer Olympics in London.

At the Intercalated Games in 1906, he won the bronze medal in the 5-mile competition. He also participated in the 1500 metres event.

In 1908 Dahl placed second in his semifinal heat of the 1500 metres with a time of 4:10.4, not advancing to the final.

In the 800 metres, Dahl did not finish his semifinal heat and did not advance to the final.

== Sources ==
- Cook, Theodore Andrea (1908). The Fourth Olympiad, Being the Official Report. London: British Olympic Association.
- De Wael, Herman (2001). "Athletics 1908". Herman's Full Olympians. Archived from the original on 27 September 2006.
- Wudarski, Pawel (1999). "Wyniki Igrzysk Olimpijskich" (in Polish). Archived from the original on 16 February 2009.

Records
Preceded by (France) Louis de Fleurac	Men's 3,000 m World Record Holder; 27 October 1907 – 21 August 1908	Succeeded by (Sweden) John Svanberg
