= Arie Vosbergen =

Dutch athlete (1882–1918)

Ary ("Arie") Carel Hugo Vosbergen (June 10, 1882 in Rotterdam – November 14, 1918 in Rotterdam) was a Dutch middle distance and long distance runner. He competed in the 1908 Summer Olympics in London.

Vosbergen finished third and last in his initial semifinal heat of the 1500 metres with a time of 4:38.6, not advancing to the final.

In the 800 metres, Vosbergen did not finish his initial semifinal heat and did not advance to the final. He was also a member of the Dutch 3-mile team race team, which lost its heat, and he competed in the 5 mile race and the Marathon, both of which he failed to finish.

In 1914, Vosbergen became Dutch champion in the 10,000 metres.

He died of the Spanish flu.

== Sources ==
- Cook, Theodore Andrea (1908). The Fourth Olympiad, Being the Official Report. London: British Olympic Association.
- Wudarski, Pawel (1999). "Wyniki Igrzysk Olimpijskich" (in Polish). Archived from the original on 14 June 2006.
- Heere, A. and Kappenburg, B. (2000) 1870 – 2000, 130 jaar atletiek in Nederland. Groenevelt b.v.
- De Wael, Herman (2001). "Athletics 1908". Herman's Full Olympians. Archived from the original on 27 September 2006.
- Arie Vosbergen at World Athletics
- Arie Vosbergen at Tilastopaja (registration required)
- Arie Vosbergen at Olympedia
