= Emilio Lunghi =

Italian athlete

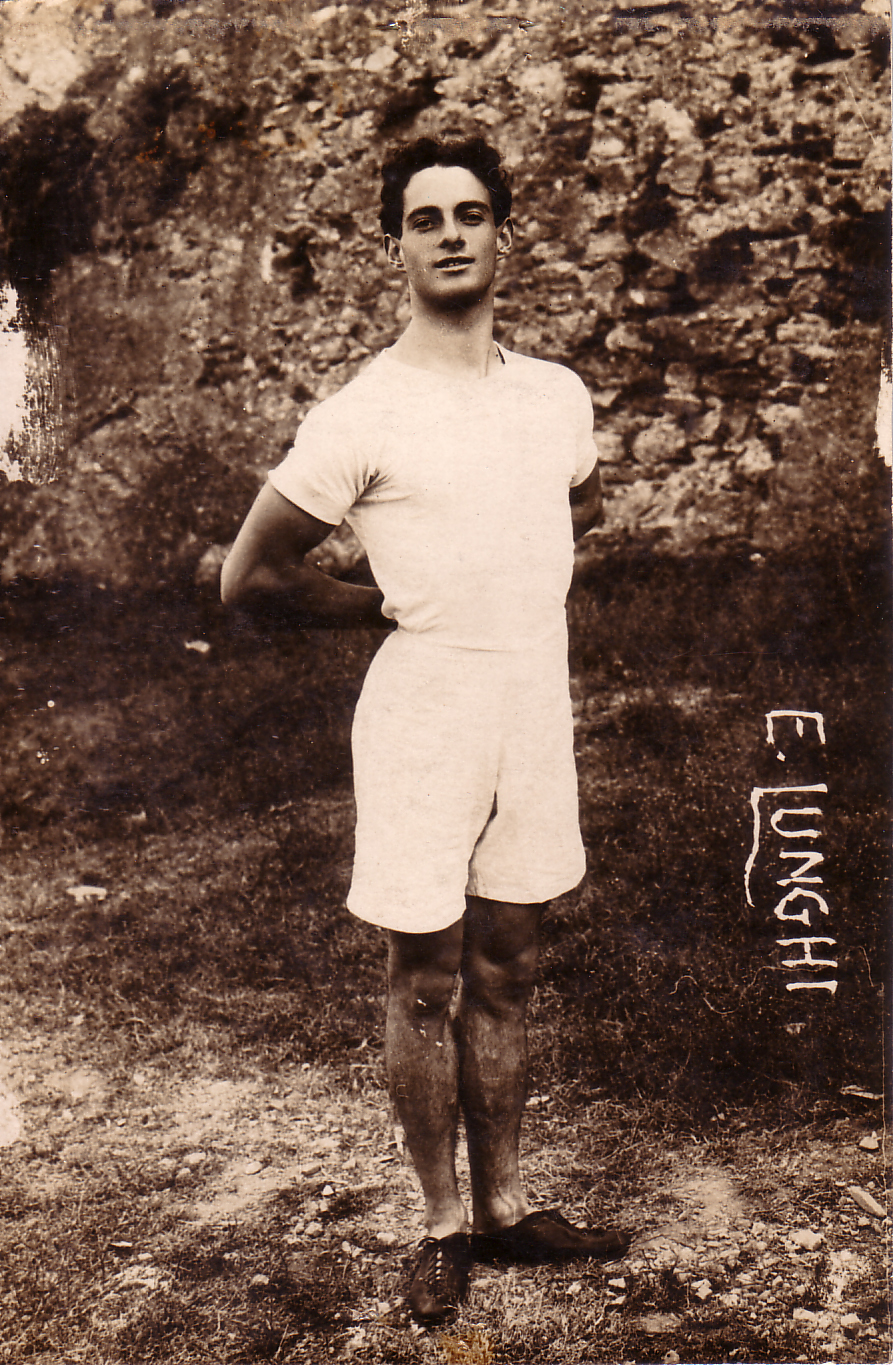

Personal information
- Born: 16 March 1887 Genoa
- Died: 27 September 1925 (aged 38) Genoa
- Height: 1.79 m (5 ft 10 in)
- Weight: 70 kg (154 lb)

Sport
- Country: Italy
- Sport: Athletics
- Event: Middle-distance running
Medal record
Olympic Games
Silver medal – second place	1908 London	800 metres

Emilio Lunghi (16 March 1887, in Genoa – 27 September 1925) was an Italian athlete. He won the silver medal in the men's 800 metres race at the 1908 Summer Olympics in London, making him the first Italian to win an Olympic medal.

== Biography ==
His time in the race was 1:54.2, which beat the previous Olympic record by 1.8 seconds but was still 1.4 seconds behind the time of Mel Sheppard, who took gold and set a new record at 1:52.8. Lunghi had won his semifinal heat with a time of 1:57.2 to advance to the final.

Lunghi also competed in the 1500 metres. His first-round heat also included Norman Hallows; both of the two runners broke the Olympic record in that heat, but Hallows came out on top by running the race in 4:03.4 as opposed to Lunghi's 4:03.8.

After the 1908 Olympics, Lunghi spent a year in New York City, and competed as a member of the Irish American Athletic Club while in the U.S., establishing three world records in the 700 yard, 880 yard and two-thirds of a mile distances.

== National titles ==
Emilio Lunghi won the individual national championship nine times in six different events.

- 1 win on 400 metres (1908)
- 1 win on 800 metres (1914)
- 3 wins on 1000 metres (1908, 1911, 1912)
- 2 wins on 1500 metres (1906, 1913)
- 1 win on 1200 metres steeplechase (1912)
- 1 win on 400 metres hurdles (1913)

== Sources ==
- Cook, Theodore Andrea (1908). The Fourth Olympiad, Being the Official Report. London: British Olympic Association.
- De Wael, Herman (2001). "Athletics 1908". Herman's Full Olympians. Archived from the original on 27 September 2006.
- Greenberg, Stan (1987). Olympic Games: The Records. London: Guinness Books. ISBN 0-85112-896-3.
- Wudarski, Pawel (1999). "Wyniki Igrzysk Olimpijskich" (in Polish). Archived from the original on 16 February 2009.
