= Joe Deakin =

British athlete (1879–1972)

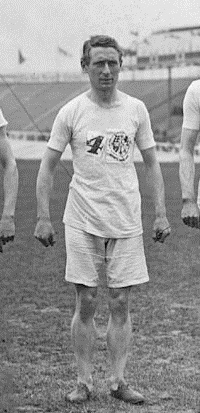
- Joe Deakin at the 1908 Olympics

Personal information
- Born: 6 February 1879 Shelton, Staffordshire, England
- Died: 30 June 1972 (aged 93) Dulwich, London, Great Britain
- Height: 1.70 m (5 ft 7 in)
- Weight: 59 kg (130 lb)

Sport
- Sport: Athletics
- Event: 800–10,000 m

Achievements and titles
- Personal bests: 800 m – 1:58.3 (1902); 1500 m – 4:07.9e (1908); 5000 m – 15:06.9 (1907); 10000 m – 32:36.5 (1908)
Medal record
Representing United Kingdom
Olympic Games
Gold medal – first place	1908 London	3 mile team
International Cross Country Championships
Gold medal – first place	1905 Dublin	Team
Bronze medal – third place	1905 Dublin	Individual
Gold medal – first place	1906 Caerleon	Team
Gold medal – first place	1908 Colombes	Team

Joseph Edmund Deakin (6 February 1879 – 30 June 1972) was a British athlete who competed at the 1908 Summer Olympics in London.

== Biography ==
Deakin served with the Rifle Brigade and fought in the Boer War. During this time, he set South African records at both the 880 yards and 1 mile. While posted to Ireland, he ran with Clonliffe Harriers and won the Irish 1 mile and 4 mile titles in 1901. Returning to England, he joined Herne Hill Harriers in 1903 and soon established a reputation as one of the country's finest cross-country runners, winning an individual bronze (1905) and team gold medals (1905, 1906 and 1908) at the International Cross Country Championships.

Deakin finished second behind George Butterfield in the 1 mile event and second behind Alexander Duncan in the 4 mile event at the 1907 AAA Championships. He also finished second in the English national cross-country championships in 1907 and showed sufficient form in track races during the early part of the 1908 season to be selected to race in three events at the Olympic Games. Deakin won his first round heat of the 1500 metres event with a time of 4:13.6. Despite being one of the slowest first round winners, Deakin won by seventy-five yards. His time in the final was better, though he still finished sixth at 4:07.9. The next morning, Deakin led the British team home to victory in the 3 mile team race, with Arthur Robertson, William Coales, Harold Wilson and Norman Hallows. After a celebratory lunch, complete with champagne refreshments, he lined up for the heats of the five miles competition. Unsurprisingly, he dropped out of the race before the finish.

Deakin joined Surrey AC after the Olympics and competed for his new club in the Polytechnic Marathon. He finished in 20th place. After service in World War I, which saw him temporarily blinded, he returned to racing and improved his previous marathon performance by finishing 8th in the 1920 "Poly". He continued in competition as a veteran, and his last race was not until the eve of his 90th birthday. He died just three years after his last race.

== See also ==
- Herne Hill Harriers
