= Charles Benedict (sport shooter) =

Sport shooter and Olympian

Personal information
- Born: May 5, 1867 Barlow Township, Ohio, United States
- Died: November 22, 1952 (aged 85) Gallipolis, Ohio, United States

Sport
- Sport: Sports shooting
Medal record
Men's shooting
Representing United States
Olympic Games
Gold medal – first place	1908 London	Military rifle, team

Charles Sumner Benedict (May 5, 1867 – November 22, 1952) was an American sport shooter, who competed in the 1908 Summer Olympics.

He was born in Barlow Township and died in Gallipolis, Ohio.

In the 1908 Olympics, he won a gold medal in the team military rifle event and finished 13th in the 1000 yard free rifle event.
