= George Butterfield (athlete) =

British middle-distance runner

Personal information
- Born: April 1879 Stockton-on-Tees, England
- Died: 24 September 1917 (aged 38) near Ieper (Ypres), West-Vlaanderen, Belgium

Sport
- Sport: Athletics
- Event: middle-distance
- Club: Darlington Harriers

George Butterfield (April 1879 – 24 September 1917) was a British athlete running for Darlington Harriers. He ran the world's fastest mile in 1906 and competed at the 1908 Summer Olympics in London.

== Biography ==
Born in Stockton on Tees, Butterfield became the National mile champion after winning the AAA Championships title at the 1905 AAA Championships. He went on to successfully defend the title in both 1906 and 1907.

Butterfield came in second in his semi-final heat in the 800 metres at the 1908 Olympic Games, with a time of 1:58.9. His finish, while behind Ödön Bodor's, was ahead of defending champion James Lightbody's. Butterfield did not advance to the final.

At the same Olympics, he also competed in the 1500 metres, placing third in his initial semifinal heat and not advancing to the final. Butterfield's time was 4:11.8; Mel Sheppard had set a new Olympic record at 4:05.0 in winning the heat and eliminating Butterfield and the other five runners.

Butterfield was killed in action during the First World War, serving as a private with the Royal Garrison Artillery. He was buried in the Birr Cross Roads Cemetery.

His obituary in the Northern Despatch recorded that he had once raced against a greyhound. The dog came second.

== See also ==
- List of Olympians killed in World War I
