= Herbert Trube =

American middle-distance runner

Olympic medal record

Men's athletics

Representing the United States
Silver medal – second place	1908 London	3 mile team

Herbert Lawrence Trube (September 3, 1886 – July 13, 1959) was an American athlete who competed in the 1908 Summer Olympics.

He competed for the United States in the 1908 Summer Olympics held in London, Great Britain in the 3 mile team, where he won the silver medal with his teammates John Eisele and George Bonhag. He also participated in the five miles competition and was eliminated in the first round after being unable to finish his run.

Trube graduated from Cornell University in 1908, where he was also a member of the Quill and Dagger society.
