= Willem Wakker =

Dutch athlete

Personal information
- Nationality: Dutch
- Born: 8 December 1879
- Died: 20 November 1959 (aged 79)

Sport
- Sport: Long-distance running
- Event: Marathon

Willem Wakker (8 December 1879 – 20 November 1959) was a Dutch long-distance runner. He competed in the men's marathon at the 1908 Summer Olympics.
