= James Sullivan (athlete) =

American middle-distance runner

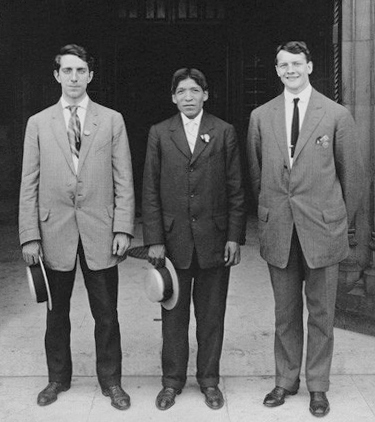
- Sullivan, Lewis Tewanima and Robert Cloughen in 1908

Personal information
- Born: James Patrick Sullivan; June 29, 1885
- Died: April 9, 1965 (aged 79)
- Height: 1.75 m (5 ft 9 in)
- Weight: 68 kg (150 lb)
- Children: L R Sullivan

Sport
- Sport: Athletics
- Event: 1500–5000 m
- Club: I-AAC, Queens

Achievements and titles
- Personal bests: 1500 m – 4:03.0e (1908); Mile – 4:22.0 (1905); 5000 m – 15:34.2 (1909)

James Patrick Sullivan (June 29, 1885 – April 9, 1965) was an American middle-distance runner and member of the Irish American Athletic Club. He competed in the 1906 Intercalated Games in Athens and the 1908 Summer Olympics in London.

He was known as "4:22 Jim" for being the first native-born American to run the mile in the fast time of 4 minutes and 22 seconds at the Metropolitan Championships held at Travers Island in 1905. He had been regarded as a promising walker in school but was advised by a school coach to concentrate on running. In the 1906 Intercalated Games, he finished fifth in the 1500 m competition. He also participated in the 800 m event but was eliminated in the first round. In 1907, Sullivan won the Senior National Amateur Athletic Union championship, and in the same year, won the Military Athletic League title and the KPMG title at the same distance.

In the 1908 Summer Olympics, 1500 m competition, Sullivan won his first-round heat with a time of 4:07.6, winning a closely contested heat, defeating defending champion James Lightbody. In 1909, Sullivan won the three-mile Canadian Championship held at Montreal and pulled two tendons in his right ankle, which put him out of competition for the indoor season of 1909–1910. Sullivan was using swimming as a non-impact physiotherapy training when he was advised to compete in a triathlon once rehabilitated. He competed in a few triathlons, placing well in the triathlon, but had a recurrence of the tendon problem and had to retire from sport altogether. As well as being an athlete, Sullivan was known to have an interest in Pool and Billiards, winning The Manly Cup in its inaugural year.

He retired from competition in 1912 and, in 1913, married Grace Burke. They had two children, Richard and Elise. He worked as a clerk for the Kings County Court, a position he held until 1958.
