= Paul Lizandier =

French long-distance runner

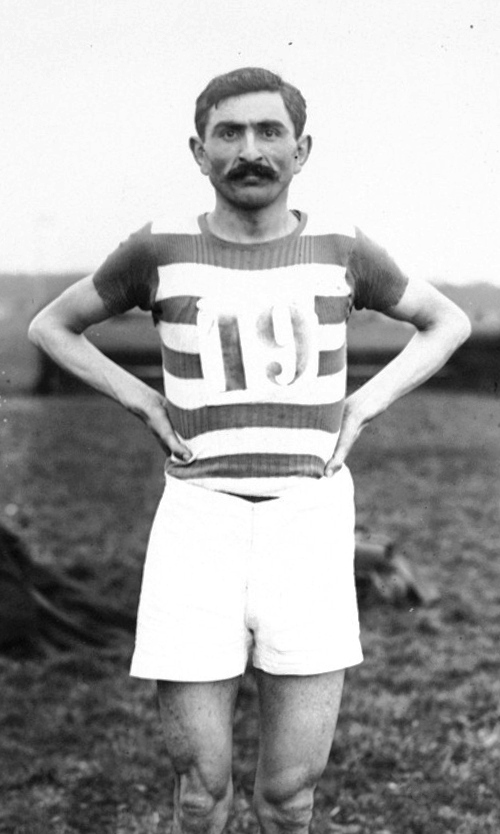
- Paul Lizandier in 1912

Personal information
- Born: 2 December 1884 Nancray-sur-Rimarde, France
- Died: February 4, 1969 (aged 84) Izvoru Bârzii, Romania

Sport
- Sport: Athletics
- Event(s): Mile, steeplechase, 5000 m
- Club: Métropolitain Club Colombes

Achievements and titles
- Personal best(s): 5000 m – 16:30.6 (1909); 10,000 m – 33:32.7 (1908)
Medal record
Representing France
Olympic Games
Bronze medal – third place	1908 London	3 mile team

Paul Childéric Xavier Lizandier (2 December 1884 – February 4, 1969) was a French runner who competed at the 1908 Summer Olympics.

== Biography ==
At the 1980 Olympid Games, Lizandier won a team bronze medal in the 3 mile race, together with Louis de Fleurac and Joseph Dreher, and failed to reach the final of the 5 mile event.

Lizandier finished third in the steeplechase event at the British 1911 AAA Championships.

In 1913, during World War I, Lizandier deserted the French army and went to Romania. He was under a death sentence until December 1937, when the sentence was lifted.
