= Alexandre Fayollat =

French middle-distance runner

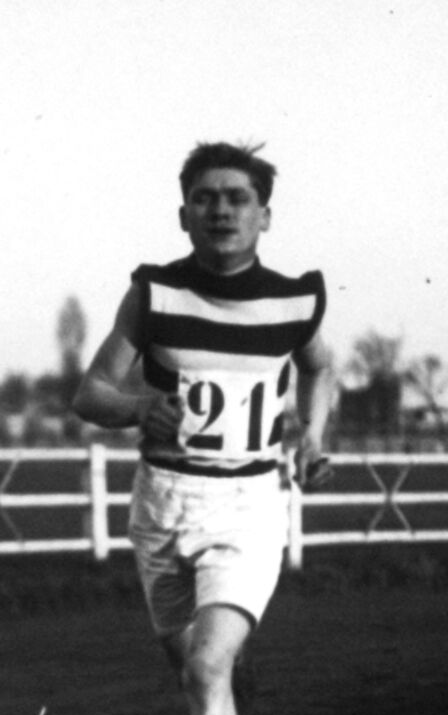

Personal information
- Nationality: French
- Born: 6 March 1889
- Died: 12 April 1957 (aged 68)

Sport
- Sport: Athletics
- Event: Middle-distance running

Alexandre Fayollat (6 March 1889 – 12 April 1957) was a French athlete. He competed in the men's 3 miles team race at the 1908 Summer Olympics, winning a bronze medal by virtue of competing for his team in the heats.

In the semifinals, Fayollat ran 15:52.2 for 3 miles and placed 13th, fourth of five runners on the French team. Fayollat did not run the final.

After the Olympics, on 11 October 1908 in Vanves, Fayollatt ran the 9th-fastest 10000 metres time of the year, with a personal best of 33:05.0.

On 5 July 1908, Fayollat won the French national outdoor 5000m championships with a time of 16:05.8.
