= Louis Bonniot de Fleurac =

French middle-distance runner (1876–1965)

Olympic medal record

Men's athletics

Representing France
Bronze medal – third place	1908 London	3 mile team

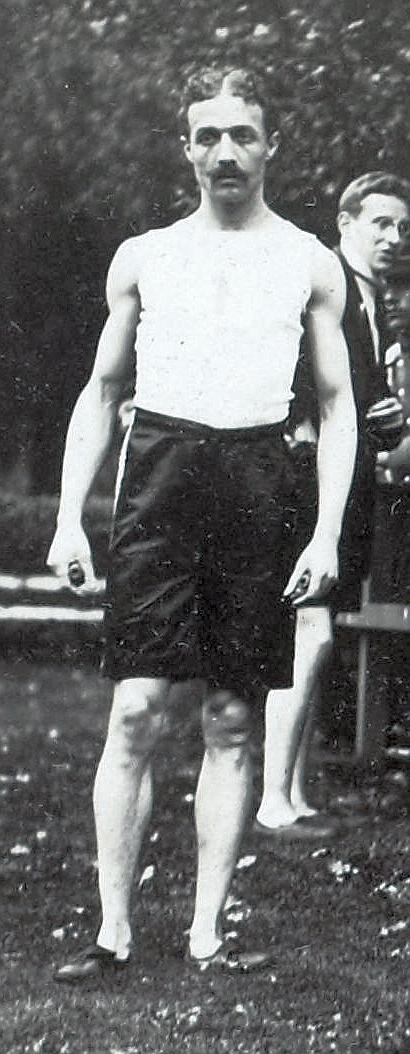
Louis Bonniot de Fleurac

Louis Bonniot de Fleurac (Louis Victor Marie Bonniot de Fleurac [lwi bɔnjo də flœʁak]; 19 November 1876 in Paris – 20 March 1965) was a French athlete. He competed in the 1906 Summer Olympics in Athens and in the 1908 Summer Olympics in London. In the 1500 metres, de Fleurac placed sixth in his initial semifinal heat and did not advance to the final.

His work was also part of the painting event in the art competition at the 1928 Summer Olympics.

== Sources ==
- Cook, Theodore Andrea (1908). The Fourth Olympiad, Being the Official Report. London: British Olympic Association.
- De Wael, Herman (2001). "Athletics 1908". Herman's Full Olympians.
- Wudarski, Pawel (1999). "Wyniki Igrzysk Olimpijskich" (in Polish).
- Louis Bonniot de Fleurac at World Athletics
- Louis Bonniot de Fleurac at Tilastopaja (registration required)
- Louis Bonniot de Fleurac at Athletics Podium
- Louis Bonniot de Fleurac at Olympedia

Records
Preceded by Incumbent	Men's 3.000m World Record Holder; 19 June 1904 – 27 October 1907	Succeeded by (Sweden) Edward Dahl
