= John Eisele =

American middle-distance runner

Medal record

Men's athletics

Representing the United States

Olympic Games
Silver medal – second place	1908 London	3 mile team
Bronze medal – third place	1908 London	3200 m steeplechase

John Eisele (John Lincoln Eisele; January 18, 1884 – March 30, 1933) was an American athlete. He won the silver medal in the 3 mile team race and bronze medal in the 3,200 meters steeplechase at the 1908 Summer Olympics in London.

Eisele was the only runner in his first round heat to finish, moving to the final after running the first round in 11:13.6. He kept pace with the leader, Arthur Russell of Great Britain and Ireland, from about the halfway mark to the bell. Archie Robertson, also of Britain, passed him then. Eisele finished third, about twenty-five yards behind the British pair. His time was 11:00.8. He also won a silver medal in the 3 miles team race together with George Bonhag and Herbert Trube.

== See also ==
- List of Princeton University Olympians
