= Arthur Robertson (athlete) =

Scottish long-distance runner

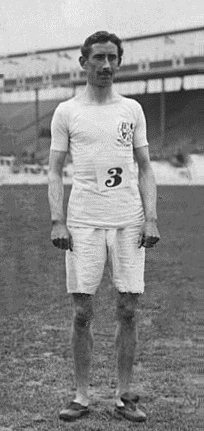
- Arthur Robertson at the 1908 Olympics

Personal information
- Born: 19 April 1879 Harthill, Sheffield, England
- Died: 18 April 1957 (aged 77) Peterborough, England

Sport
- Country: Great Britain
- Sport: Athletics
- Event: 1500–10,000 m (1-10 miles)
- Club: Birchfield Harriers

Achievements and titles
- Olympic finals: 1908
- Personal bests: Mile – 4:23.4e (1909); 5000 m – 15:01.2 (1908); 10,000 m – 31:30.4 (1908); Hour – 18,479 m
Medal record
Representing Great Britain
Olympic Games
Gold medal – first place	1908 London	3 mile team
Silver medal – second place	1908 London	3200 m s'chase
Representing England
International Cross Country Championships
Gold medal – first place	1908 Colombes	Individual
Gold medal – first place	1908 Colombes	Team

Arthur James Robertson (Note: Some sources report a nickname "Archie".) (19 April 1879 – 18 April 1957) was a British runner who competed at the 1908 Summer Olympics in London. He won the gold medal in the 3-mile team race and a silver in the steeplechase.

== Biography ==
Robertson born in Sheffield, was the son of a Glasgow doctor and was educated at Kelvinside Academy, Glasgow, before moving to King's School, Peterborough at the age of 14. A brilliant all-round sportsman, he initially concentrated on cycling and only took up serious athletics at the age of 25, after a cycling injury.

In 1906, he joined Birchfield Harriers. In March 1908 he won both the English and International Cross-Country Championships and a second-place finish in the 4 mile race at the AAA Championships earned him a place at the Olympics.

Robertson represented Great Britain at the 1908 Summer Olympics in London. Robertson won easily in the first round of the 3200 metres steeplechase, finishing in 11:10.0. In the final, he trailed for most of the race. At the bell, he passed one of the two then-leaders, American John Eisele. Robertson was not quite able to catch the other leader, however, and trailed fellow Briton Arthur Russell by two yards at the finish. His final time was 10:48.4. At the same Olympics he won gold as a member of the 5-man 3 mile team race with Joe Deakin, William Coales, Norman Hallows and Harold Wilson; the first Olympic gold won by a Scottish and Birchfield athlete. He also participated in the five miles event and finished fifth. His brother David was a member of the British cycling team at the same olympics.

On 13 September 1908 Robertson set a world record at 15:01.2 over 5,000 metres, running on a concrete cycle track in Stockholm. He retired from athletics after 1909 season and returned to cycling. Later, together with his brother, he ran a sports shop in Peterborough, and then passed it over to his son.

Robertson finished second behind Eddie Owen (1 mile) and Emil Voigt (4 miles) at the 1909 AAA Championships.

Robertson was posthumously inducted into the Scottish Sporting Hall of Fame in 2004. In January 2010, a new J D Wetherspoon pub in Perry Barr, Birmingham (close to Perry Barr Stadium, the former home of Birchfield Harriers) was named 'The Arthur Robertson' in his honour.
