= John Svanberg =

Swedish long-distance runner

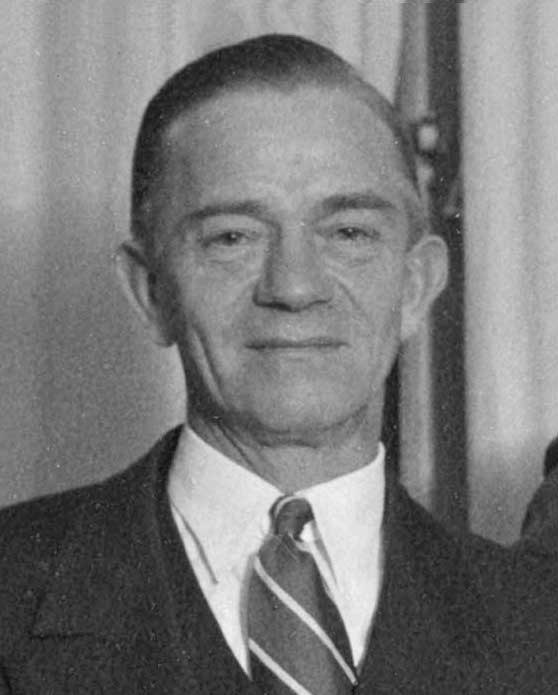

Personal information
- Born: 1 May 1881 Stockholm, Sweden
- Died: 11 September 1957 (aged 76) New York City, United States
- Height: 168 cm (5 ft 6 in)
- Weight: 59 kg (130 lb)

Sport
- Sport: Athletics
- Event: Marathon
- Club: Fredrikshofs IF, Stockholm

Achievements and titles
- Personal bests: 5 miles – 24:47.6 (1907); Marathon – 2:58:21 (1906)
Medal record
Representing Sweden
Olympic Games
Bronze medal – third place	1908 London	5 miles
Intercalated Games
Silver medal – second place	1906 Athens	5 miles
Silver medal – second place	1906 Athens	Marathon

Johan Frithiof Isidor "John" Svanberg (1 May 1881 – 11 September 1957) was a Swedish runner. He competed in the 5 miles and marathon at the 1906 Intercalated Games and 1908 Summer Olympics and won two silver and one bronze medals. In 1908 he set a world record over 3000 m that stood until 1911.

After the 1908 Olympics, Svanberg was deprived of his amateur status for some commercial activities. He moved to the United States, where he worked as a painter and continued competing in running. He died in New York in 1957.

Records
Preceded by (Sweden) Edward Dahl	Men's 3,000 m World Record Holder; 21 August 1908 – 11 June 1911	Succeeded by (France) Jean Bouin
