= Merritt Giffin =

American discus thrower

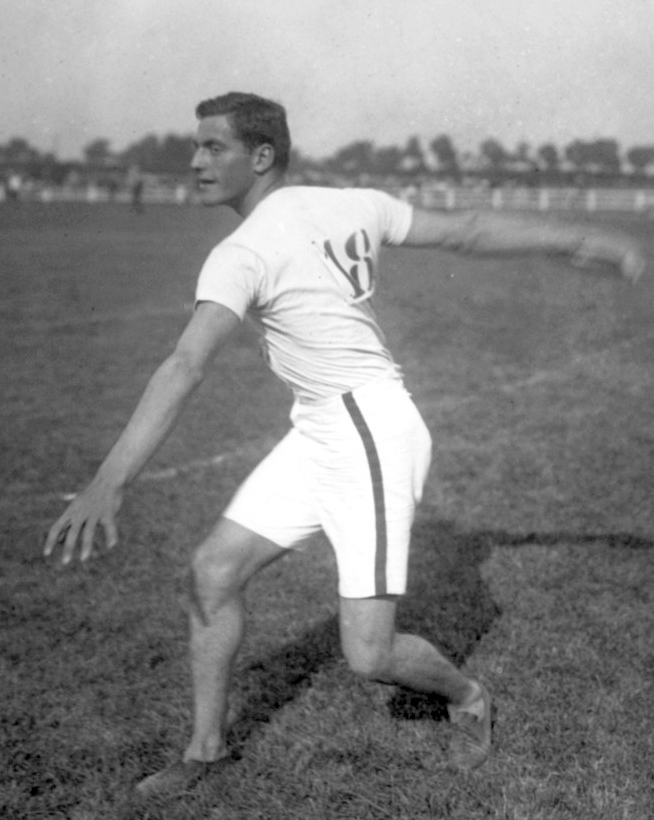
- Merritt Giffin in France in 1908

Personal information
- Born: August 20, 1887 Lockport, Illinois, United States
- Died: July 11, 1911 (aged 23) Joliet, Illinois, United States
- Height: 186 cm (6 ft 1 in)
- Weight: 84 kg (185 lb)

Sport
- Sport: Athletics
- Event: Discus throw
- Club: Chicago AA

Achievements and titles
- Personal best: DT – 42.06 m (1908)
Medal record
Representing the United States
Olympic Games
Silver medal – second place	1908 London	Discus throw

Merritt Hayward Giffin (August 20, 1887 – July 11, 1911) was an American athlete who won a silver medal in the discus throw at the 1908 Summer Olympics. He also won the AAU discus title in 1910.
