= Athletics at the 1908 Summer Olympics – Men's 1500 metres =

Men's 1500 metres at the Games of the IV Olympiad
- Venue: White City Stadium
- Dates: 13 July 1908 (semifinals); 14 July 1908 (final)
- Competitors: 44 from 15 nations
- Winning time: 4:03.4 =OR

Medalists
1st place, gold medalist(s)		Mel Sheppard; United States
2nd place, silver medalist(s)		Harold A. Wilson; Great Britain
3rd place, bronze medalist(s)		Norman Hallows; Great Britain

The men's 1500 metres was an Olympic event for the fourth time at the 1908 Summer Olympics. The competition was held on 13 and 14 July 1908. The races were held on a track of 536.45 metre (1/3 mile) circumference. The event was won by Mel Sheppard of the United States, the second consecutive Games an American had won the event. Sheppard, like Jim Lightbody in 1904, would also win the 800 metres for a middle-distance double.

44 runners from 15 nations competed. NOCs could enter up to 12 athletes. There were eight heats of the first round, with the winners of those heats competing in the final.

== Background ==
This was the fourth appearance of the event, which is one of 12 athletics events to have been held at every Summer Olympics. The only runner from 1904 to return was the champion, Jim Lightbody. Unlike the previous two Games, the field included some top runners in 1908. Harold A. Wilson had broken the world record in the British Olympic trials. His countryman George Butterfield had won the AAA one-mile title through 1905–07. John Halstead, Mel Sheppard, and Lightbody were among the top American runners.

Australasia, Belgium, Finland, Hungary, Italy, the Netherlands, Norway, and Sweden each made their first appearance in the event (though Australia had previously competed, in 1896). The United States made its fourth appearance, the only nation to have competed in the men's 1500 metres at each Games to that point.

== Competition format ==
For the first time, the competition consisted of two rounds. In previous Games, there had never been more than 9 runners; now, there were 44. Eight unseeded semifinals were held, with anywhere between 3 and 9 runners in each. Only the top runner advanced. This format left many of the top runners out of the final.

== Records ==
These were the standing world and Olympic records prior to the 1908 Summer Olympics.

World record	Harold A. Wilson (GBR)	3:59.8 (u)	London, United Kingdom	30 May 1908
Olympic record	Jim Lightbody (USA)	4:05.4	St. Louis, United States	3 September 1904

In the second semifinal Mel Sheppard set a new Olympic record at 4:05.0 only to be improved in the next run by Norman Hallows, who ran 4:03.4. In the final Mel Sheppard equalized this time when he also ran 4:03.4.

== Schedule ==
Date	Time	Round
Monday 13 July 1908	16:00	Semifinals
Tuesday 14 July 1908	17:20	Final

== Results ==
=== Semifinals ===
The semifinals of the 1500 metres were the first competitions of the athletics programme held, on Monday 13 July. The fastest runner in each semifinal heat advanced to the final the next day while all other runners were eliminated.

==== Semifinal 1 ====
Meadows, de Fleurac, Smith, and Lightbody all had the lead during the race. Sullivan won by six yards.

Rank	Athlete	Nation	Time	Notes
1	James Sullivan	United States	4:07.6	Q
2	James Lightbody	United States	4:08.6	
3	Frederick Meadows	Canada	4:12.2	
4	Francis Knott	Great Britain	Unknown	
5	Josh Smith	Great Britain	Unknown	
6	Louis de Fleurac	France	Unknown	
7	Nils Dahl	Norway	Unknown	
8	Ödön Bodor	Hungary	Unknown	
9	Jacques Keyser	Netherlands	Unknown	

==== Semifinal 2 ====
Butterfield and Lee were ahead of Sheppard and Halstead at the bell, but the American pair proved the better runners on the straight and passed the English duo. Sheppard's time set a new Olympic record, with Halstead just behind him clocking in at the old record time.

Rank	Athlete	Nation	Time	Notes
1	Mel Sheppard	United States	4:05.0	Q, OR
2	John Halstead	United States	4:05.6	
3	George Butterfield	Great Britain	4:11.8	
4	John W. Lee	Great Britain	(4:12.4)	
5	Joseph Lynch	Australasia	Unknown	
6	Kjeld Nielsen	Denmark	Unknown	
7	Arno Hesse	Germany	Unknown	

==== Semifinal 3 ====
Lunghi was passed by Hallows on the last lap, who won by two yards. Both Hallows and Lunghi beat the Olympic record set by Sheppard in the previous heat; the pace caused the remaining four competitors to drop out.

Rank	Athlete	Nation	Time	Notes
1	Norman Hallows	Great Britain	4:03.4	Q, OR
2	Emilio Lunghi	Italy	4:03.8	
—	Evert Björn	Sweden	DNF	
—	Massimo Cartasegna	Italy	DNF	
—	Frank Riley	United States	DNF	
—	Charles Swain	Australasia	DNF	

==== Semifinal 4 ====
McGough led for the greater part of the race, with Loney and Coe passing him late and battling to the finish. Loney won by two yards.

Rank	Athlete	Nation	Time	Notes
1	Ernest Loney	Great Britain	4:08.4	Q
2	Harry Coe	United States	4:09.2	
3	John McGough	Great Britain	4:16.4	
4	Stefanos Dimitrios	Greece	Unknown	
5	Joseph Dreher	France	Unknown	

==== Semifinal 5 ====
Raugeneau pulled up lame on the second lap, leaving Tait to win by fifty yards.

Rank	Athlete	Nation	Time	Notes
1	John Tait	Canada	4:12.2	Q
2	József Nagy	Hungary	4:19.6	
3	Fredrik Svanström	Finland	4:25.2	
—	Gaston Ragueneau	France	DNF	

==== Semifinal 6 ====
Deakin won by seventy-five yards.

Rank	Athlete	Nation	Time	Notes
1	Joe Deakin	Great Britain	4:13.6	Q
2	Andreas Breynck	Germany	4:30.0	
3	Arie Vosbergen	Netherlands	4:38.6	

==== Semifinal 7 ====
Galbraith led most of the race, but was passed by Wilson, who won by 30 yards.

Rank	Athlete	Nation	Time	Notes
1	Harold A. Wilson	Great Britain	4:11.4	Q
2	Jean Bouin	France	4:17.0	
3	William Galbraith	Canada	4:20.2	

==== Semifinal 8 ====
Braun, Dahl, and Crawford were the clear frontrunners for the entire race. Crawford pulled in front late, and won by four yards.

Rank	Athlete	Nation	Time	Notes
1	Ivo Fairbairn-Crawford	Great Britain	4:09.2	Q
2	Edward Dahl	Sweden	4:10.4	
3	Hanns Braun	Germany	4:18.2	
4	Oscar Larsen	Norway	Unknown	
5	François Delloye	Belgium	Unknown	
6	Axel Andersson	Sweden	Unknown	
7	James Fitzgerald	Canada	Unknown	

=== Final ===
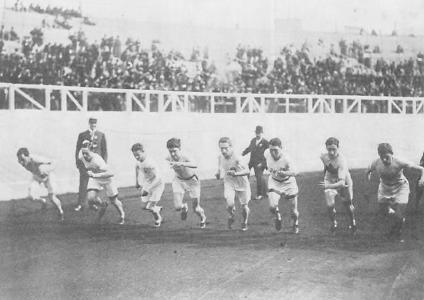
The start of the final.

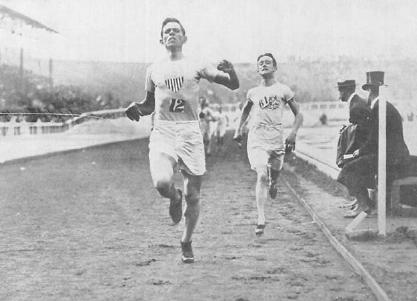
Mel Sheppard winning the final.

The final was held on Tuesday 14 July. Crawford went out fast, leading for the first 500 metres before tiring badly. Wilson, Hallows, and Sheppard led out going into the final straight, but Sheppard's late burst powered him to the front. He won by about 2 yards and equalled the Olympic record that Hallows had set in the first round.

Rank	Athlete	Nation	Time	Notes
1st place, gold medalist(s)	Mel Sheppard	United States	4:03.4	=OR
2nd place, silver medalist(s)	Harold A. Wilson	Great Britain	4:03.6	
3rd place, bronze medalist(s)	Norman Hallows	Great Britain	4:04.0	
4	John Tait	Canada	4:06.8	
5	Ivo Fairbairn-Crawford	Great Britain	4:07.6	
6	Joe Deakin	Great Britain	4:07.9	
—	Ernest Loney	Great Britain	DNF	
—	James Sullivan	United States	DNF	

== Sources ==
- Cook, Theodore Andrea (1908). The Fourth Olympiad, Being the Official Report. London: British Olympic Association.
- De Wael, Herman (2001). "Athletics 1908". Herman's Full Olympians. Archived from the original on 27 September 2006.
- Wudarski, Pawel (1999). "Wyniki Igrzysk Olimpijskich" (in Polish).
