= William Coales =

English long-distance runner

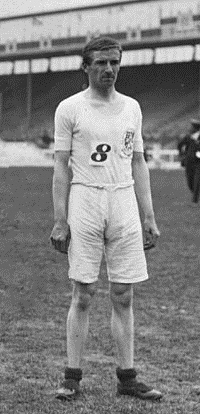
- Coales at the 1908 Olympics

Personal information
- Born: 8 January 1886 Aldwinkle, Northamptonshire, England
- Died: 19 January 1960 (aged 74) Sudbury, Suffolk, England
- Height: 1.67 m (5 ft 6 in)
- Weight: 56 kg (123 lb)

Sport
- Sport: Athletics
- Event: long-distance
- Club: Thrapston & District Harriers & Athletic Club

Achievements and titles
- Personal bests: 5000 m – 15:06.1 (1908); 10,000 m – 32:41.0 (1910)
Medal record
Representing Great Britain
Olympic Games
Gold medal – first place	1908 London	3 mile team

William Coales (8 January 1886 – 19 January 1960) was an English long-distance runner who competed at the 1908 Summer Olympics.

== Biography ==
Coales represented Great Britain at the 1908 Summer Olympics in London.

Coales won a gold medal in the 3 mile team, together with Joe Deakin, Arthur Robertson, Harold Wilson and Norman Hallows. On the same day, he ran the five mile heats but failed to finish.
