= Norman Hallows =

English middle-distance runner

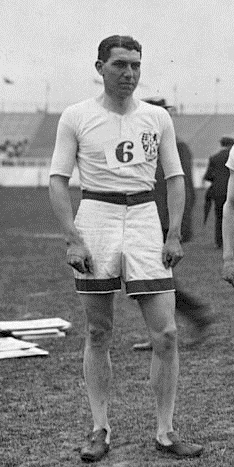
- Norman Hallows at the 1908 Olympics

Personal information
- Born: 29 December 1886 Doncaster, South Yorkshire, England
- Died: 16 October 1968 (aged 81) Marlborough, Wiltshire, England
- Education: University of Oxford
- Height: 1.75 m (5 ft 9 in)
- Weight: 60 kg (130 lb)

Sport
- Sport: Athletics
- Event: 1500–5,000 m
- Club: University of Oxford AC; Achilles Club

Achievements and titles
- Personal bests: 1500 m: 4:03.4 (1908); 5000 m: 15:32.0 (1908)
Medal record
Representing Great Britain
Olympic Games
Gold medal – first place	1908 London	3 mile team
Bronze medal – third place	1908 London	1500 metres

Norman Frederick Hallows (29 December 1886 – 16 October 1968) was an English middle-distance runner who competed at the 1908 Summer Olympics.

== Biography ==
Hallows was educated at Felsted School and Keble College, Oxford (University of Oxford).

Hallows represented Great Britain at the 1908 Summer Olympics in London and won the bronze medal and set an Olympic record in the 1500 metres race. His time in the first round was 4:03.4, beating the Olympic record set by American Mel Sheppard only minutes earlier by 1.6 seconds. In the final, Sheppard matched Hallows' first round time while Hallows finished in third place at 4:04.0. Hallows was also a member of the 3 miles team race with Joe Deakin, Arthur Robertson, William Coales and Harold Wilson, which claimed the gold medal at the same games.

Hallows studied at Leeds University, and St Thomas' Hospital in London. He took part in the Balkan Wars of 1912–13 as a Red Cross staff and later in World War I, as a Captain of the Royal Army Medical Corps in France. In 1919 he was appointed as the resident Medical Officer at Marlborough College. Using the pen name "Duplex" he co-wrote several books on engineering.
