= Gayle Dull =

American middle-distance runner

Personal information
- Full name: Gayle Albert Dull
- Nationality: American
- Born: May 4, 1883
- Died: October 16, 1918 (aged 35)

Sport
- Sport: Middle-distance running
- Event: Steeplechase

Gayle Albert Dull (May 4, 1883 – October 16, 1918) was an American middle-distance runner. He competed in the men's 3200 metres steeplechase at the 1908 Summer Olympics.
