= Harold A. Wilson (athlete) =

British athlete (1885 – 1932)

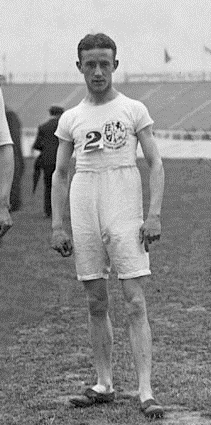
- Harold Wilson at the 1908 Olympics

Personal information
- Born: 22 January 1885 Horncastle, Lincolnshire, England
- Died: 17 May 1932 (aged 47) South Africa
- Height: 5 ft 4 in (1.63 m)
- Weight: 8 st 3 lb (52 kg)

Sport
- Sport: Athletics
- Event: 800-5,000 m
- Club: Hallamshire Harriers, Sheffield

Achievements and titles
- Personal bests: 800 m – 1:57.2 (1904); 1500 m – 3:59.8 (1908); 5000 m – 15:32.5 (1908)
Medal record
Representing United Kingdom
Olympic Games
Gold medal – first place	1908 London	3 miles team race
Silver medal – second place	1908 London	1500 metres

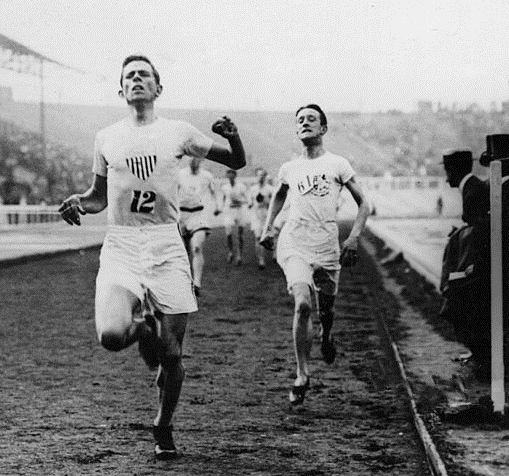
Mel Sheppard narrowly defeating Wilson in the 1500 metres race in the 1908 Olympics.

Harold Allan Wilson (22 January 1885 – 17 May 1932) was an English runner. Born in Horncastle, Lincolnshire, he was a member of the Hallamshire Harriers in Sheffield. He competed at the 1908 Summer Olympics in London and won a team gold in the 3 mile and an individual silver in the 1500 metres race. He was the first man to run a sub four minute 1,500 metres, with a time of 3:59.8 in May 1908.

Wilson became the National 1 mile champion after winning the AAA Championships title at the 1908 AAA Championships.

At the 1908 Olympics, Wilson won his 1500 m semi-final in a time of 4:11.4; his time in the final was 4:03.6, fractions of a second behind Melvin Sheppard. He was also part of Britain's five-man gold medal-winning team in the three-mile race. He was Britain's fourth man home in fifth place overall. His teammates were Archie Robertson, Norman Hallows, Joe Deakin and William Coales.

The following year, Wilson was in Queens, New York, competing alongside Sheppard. He spent the 1909 season in the U.S. and was considered one of the best mile runners. The same year, he turned professional and raced in Australia and South Africa. On 29 November 1915, he enlisted as a private in the West Yorkshire Regiment, serving overseas during World War I. He later emigrated to South Africa, where he died in 1932 aged 47.
