= Joseph Dreher =

French athlete

Olympic medal record

Men's athletics

Representing France
Bronze medal – third place	1908 London	3 mile team

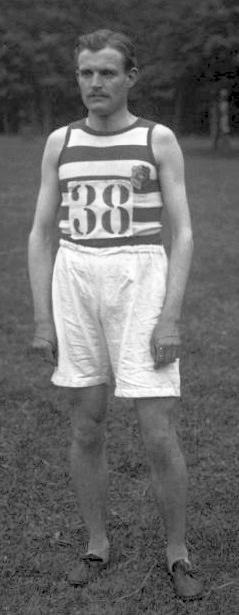
Joseph Dreher, winner of the 1500m. qualifying dish for the Olympic Games (June 8, 1908, Saint-Cloud stadium

Joseph Dreher (15 May 1884 – 28 September 1941) was a French athlete. He competed at the 1908 Summer Olympics in London. In the 1500 metres, Dreher placed fifth and last in his initial semifinal heat and did not advance to the final.

== Sources ==
- Cook, Theodore Andrea (1908). The Fourth Olympiad, Being the Official Report. London: British Olympic Association.
- De Wael, Herman (2001). "Athletics 1908". Herman's Full Olympians. Archived from the original on 27 September 2006.
- Wudarski, Pawel (1999). "Wyniki Igrzysk Olimpijskich" (in Polish). Archived from the original on 14 October 2008.
- Joseph Dreher's profile at Sports Reference.com
