= George Bonhag =

American athlete

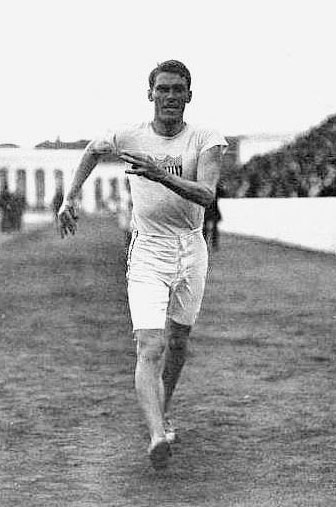
- Bonhag winning the 1500 m walk at the 1906 Intercalated Games

Personal information
- Full name: George Valentine Bonhag
- Born: January 31, 1882 Boston, Massachusetts, U.S.
- Died: October 30, 1960 (aged 78) Bronx, New York City, U.S.
- Height: 5 ft 10 in (178 cm)
- Weight: 132 lb (60 kg)

Sport
- Sport: Athletics
- Event: 1-6 miles
- Club: Irish-American Athletic Club

Achievements and titles
- Personal bests: Mile – 4:22.4i (1910); 2 miles – 9:20.8i (1911); 5000 m – 15:05.8i (1912); 6 miles – 30:42.0i (1909)
Medal record
Representing the United States
Olympic Games
Gold medal – first place	1912 Stockholm	3000 m team
Silver medal – second place	1908 London	3 mile team
Intercalated Games
Gold medal – first place	1906 Athens	1500 m walk

George Valentine Bonhag (January 31, 1882 – October 30, 1960) was an American athlete and a member of the Irish American Athletic Club and the New York City Police Department. He competed in distance events, both racewalking and running, at the 1904, 1908 and 1912 Olympics and at the 1906 Intercalated Games.

An announcement in the August 6, 1904, issue of The New York Times indicated that the Metropolitan Association of the Amateur Athletic Union would hold a "special five-mile race" at Celtic Park on August 13, 1904, with the eight top finishers receiving a paid trip to compete in the marathon at the Olympic Games in St. Louis on August 30, 1904. Bonhag, listed as representing the Greater New York Irish Athletic Association, was named as one of 19 "probable competitors" in the event.

At the 1904 Summer Olympics he competed in 800 m running but his result is unknown. At the 1906 Intercalated Games he placed fourth over 5 miles and sixth over 1500 m. Disappointed and highly motivated to make up for his loss, he entered the 1500 m walk and won the gold medal. This was the only time he competed in this event, and the first walking race at Olympics. The rules were not clearly set, and many of the nine competitors, including Bonhag, were "skipping" (i.e. changing to half-running). The first two finishers, Robert Wilkinson and Eugen Spiegler were disqualified for skipping. Two of four judges voted to disqualify Bonhag too, but he was defended by James Sullivan, chief judge of the event, and Prince George, who was president of the jury. A re-walk was set up between Bonhag and Don Linden, who finished fourth. Bonhag did not show up at the re-walk, and for uncertain reasons the jury did not change the race results and gave the gold medal to Bonhag and silver to Linden.

Two years later Bonhag was part of the American 3 mile team that won the silver medal. Bonhag also participated in the 3200 m steeplechase event, but was eliminated in the first round. In his fourth Olympics in 1912 he won a team gold medal in the 3000 m race and placed fourth over 5000 m. He also participated in the individual cross country contest. As he was one of three Americans who did not finish the race, his team was unplaced.

Bonhag also competed in the exhibition baseball tournament at the 1912 Olympics.

Olympic Games
Preceded by Ralph Rose	Flagbearer for United States; Stockholm 1912	Succeeded by Pat McDonald
