= Athletics at the 1912 Summer Olympics =

Athletics at the Games of the V Olympiad
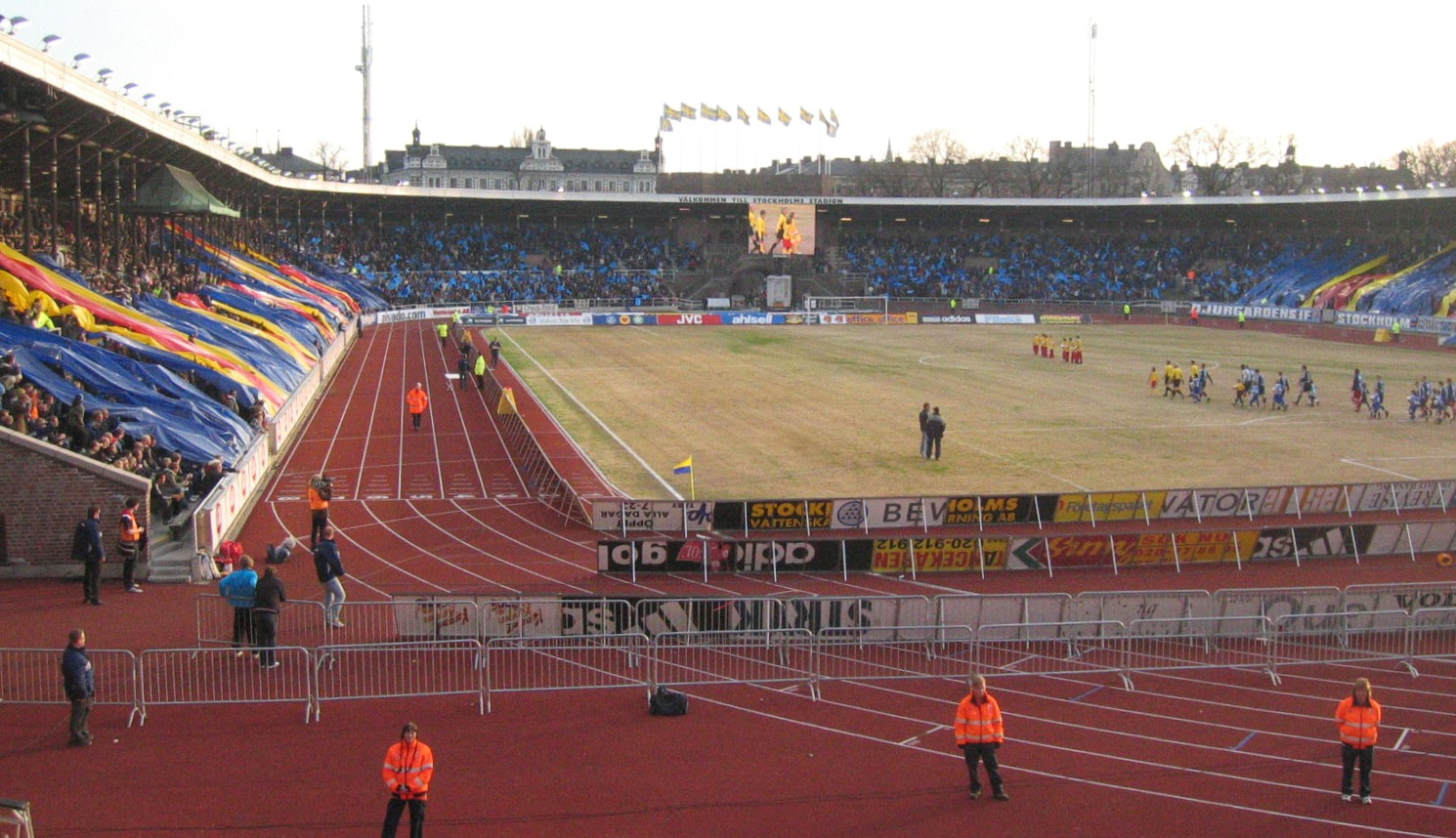
- Host stadium (shown in 2006)
- Venue: Stockholm Olympic Stadium
- Dates: 6–15 July
- No. of events: 30
- Competitors: 556 from 27 nations

These are the results of athletics competition at the 1912 Summer Olympics. 30 events were contested, all for men only.

The athletics programme grew by four events since the 1908 Summer Olympics. The 5000 and 10,000 metre races were introduced, as the 5 mile event was eliminated. The 400 metre hurdle event made a brief disappearance, making the 1912 Olympics the only time that event was not held since its introduction in 1900. The 4 × 100 and 4 × 400 relays replaced the medley relay while the team race was shortened from 3 miles to 3000 metres. The decathlon, which had been held in 1904 but not in 1908, returned to the programme. Steeplechasing was eliminated, while racewalking was cut from 2 events to 1 with the 10 kilometre replacing the 10 mile and the 3500 metre eliminated. The pentathlon was introduced (as well as the separate sport modern pentathlon). The 1908 experiments of the Greek-style discus and the restricted javelin were replaced with two-handed throwing, for the shot put, discus, and javelin. Cross-country events, both for the individual and the team, were introduced. The competitions were held from Saturday, July 6, 1912, to Monday, July 15, 1912.

== Medal summary ==
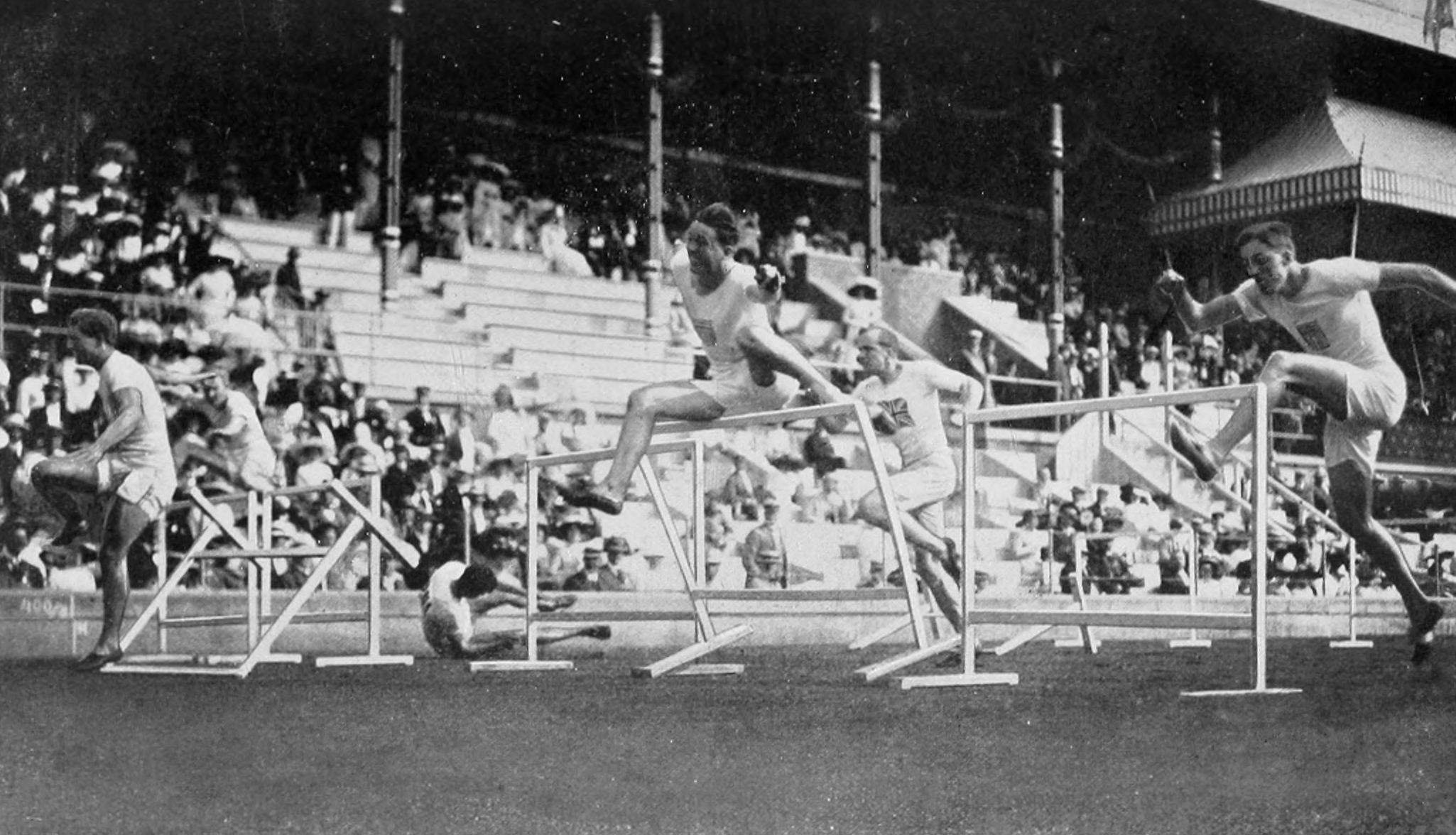
110 metre hurdles final.

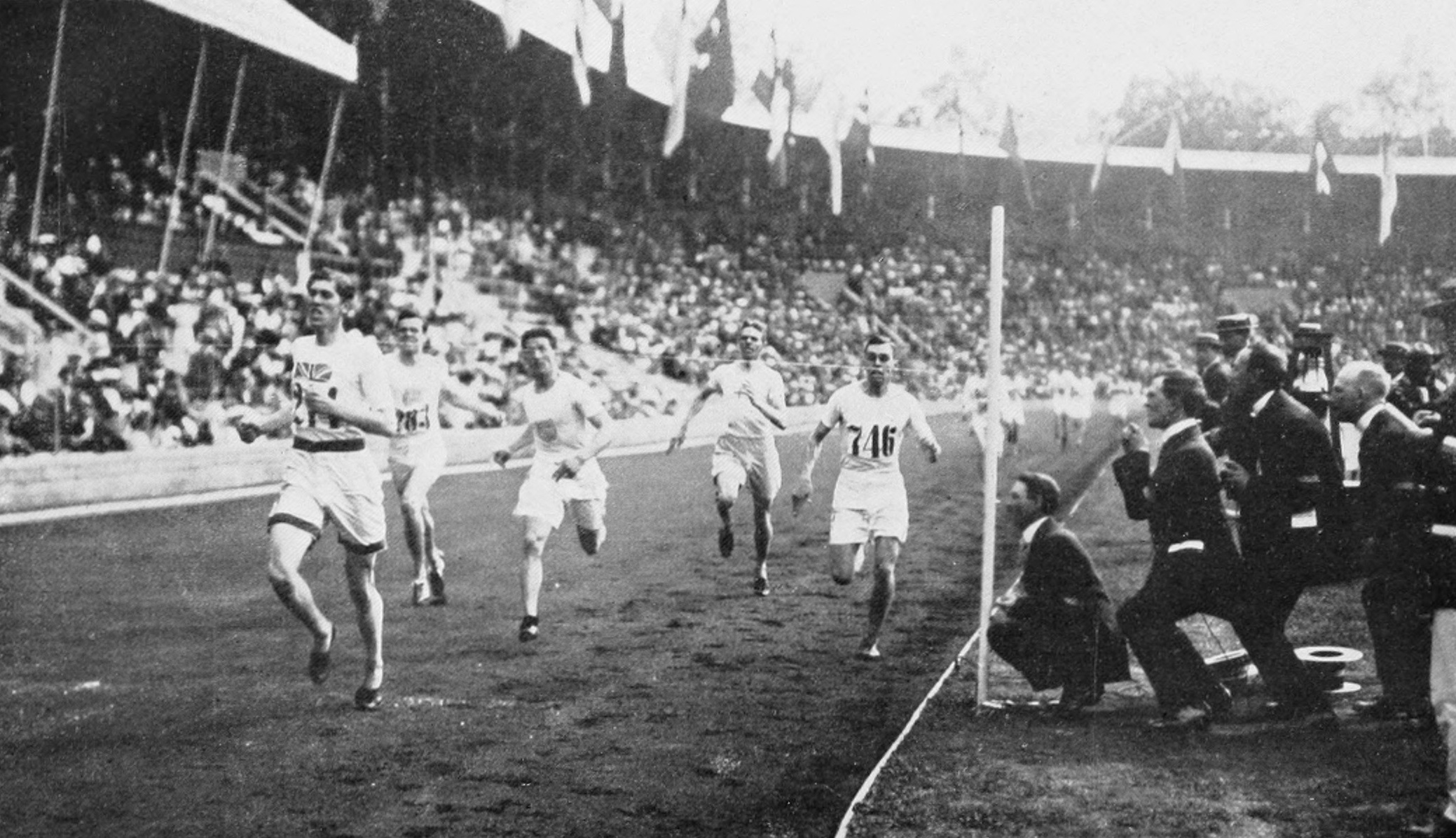
1500 metre final.

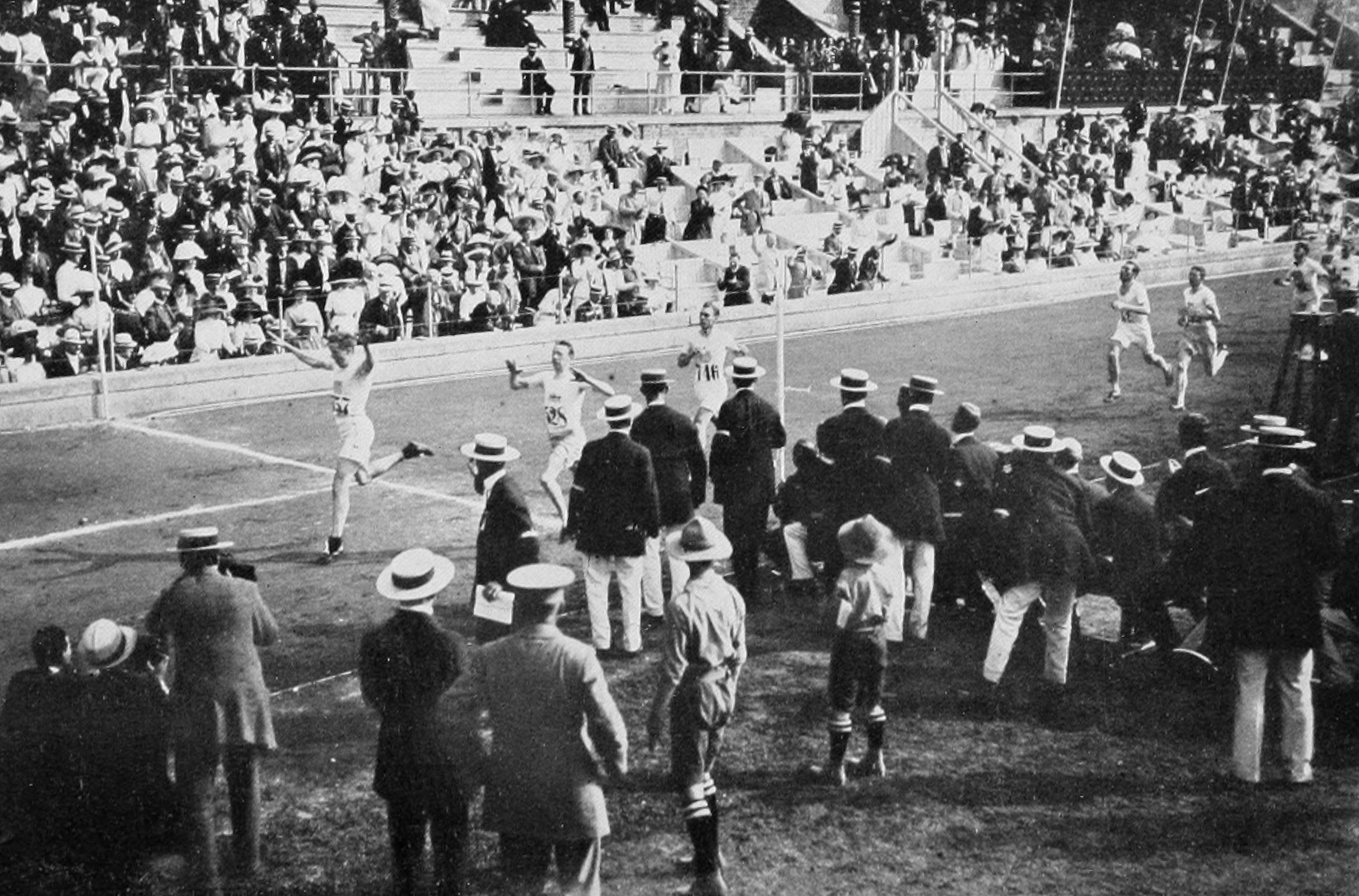
3000 metre team race final.

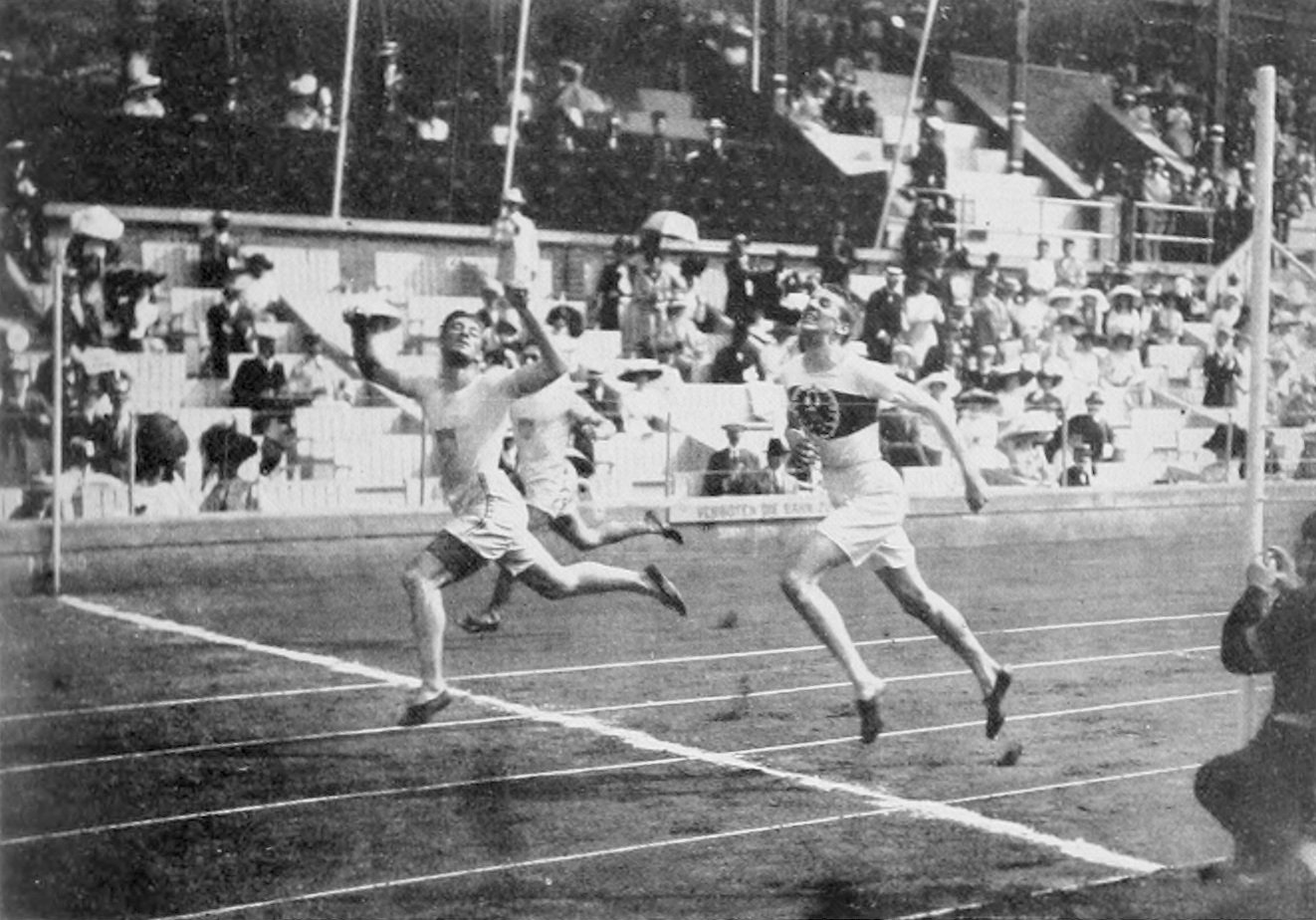
400 metre final.

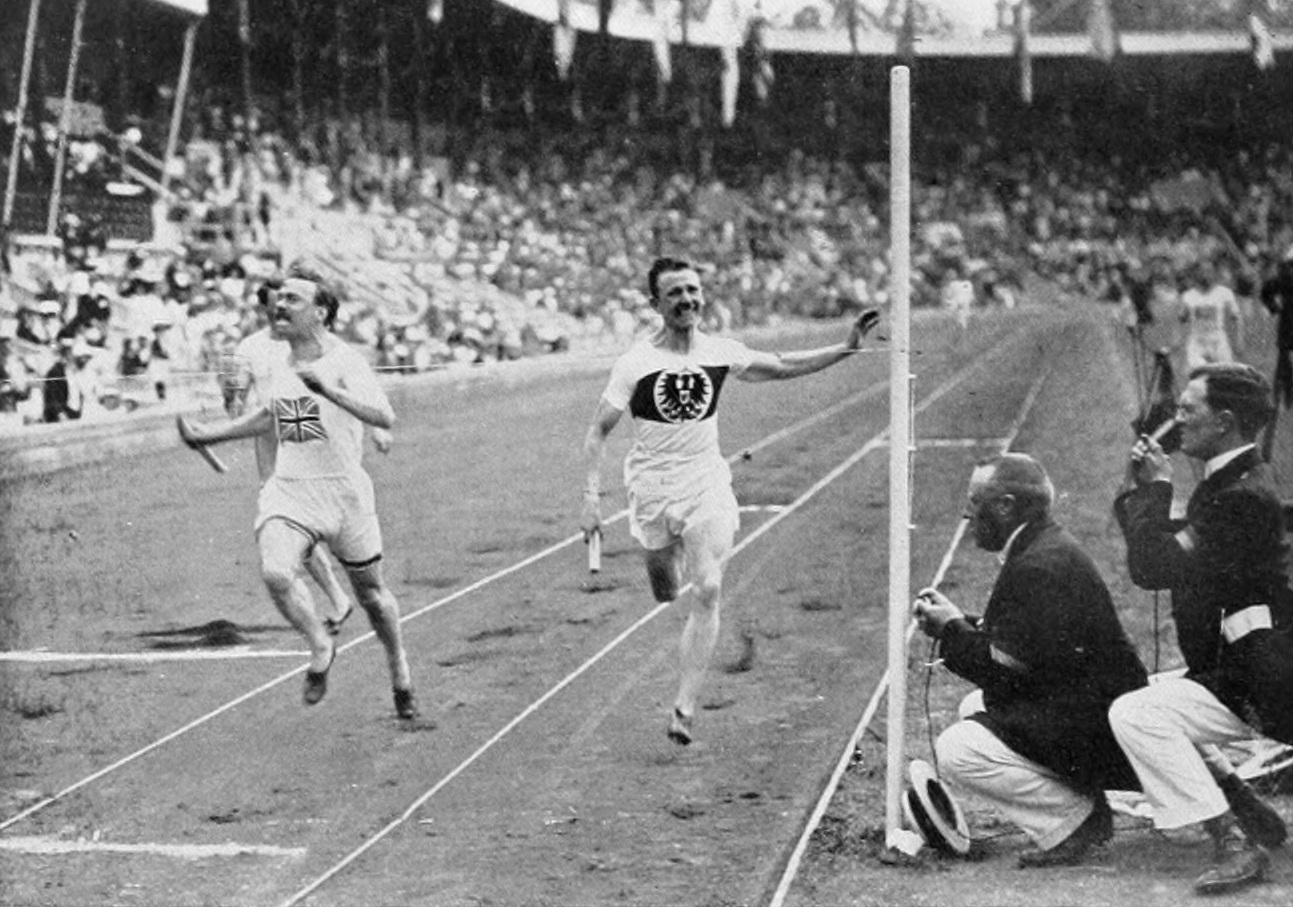
4 × 100 metre final.

| Event | Gold | | Silver | | Bronze | |
|---|---|---|---|---|---|---|
| 100 metres | Ralph Craig; United States | 10.8 | Alvah Meyer; United States | 10.9 | Donald Lippincott; United States | 10.9 |
| 200 metres | Ralph Craig; United States | 21.7 | Donald Lippincott; United States | 21.8 | Willie Applegarth; Great Britain | 22.0 |
| 400 metres | Charles Reidpath; United States | 48.2 WR | Hanns Braun; Germany | 48.3 | Edward Lindberg; United States | 48.4 |
| 800 metres | Ted Meredith; United States | 1:51.9 WR | Mel Sheppard; United States | 1:52.0 | Ira Davenport; United States | 1:52.0 |
| 1500 metres | Arnold Jackson; Great Britain | 3:56.8 OR | Abel Kiviat; United States | 3:56.9 | Norman Taber; United States | 3:56.9 |
| 5000 metres | Hannes Kolehmainen; Finland | 14:36.6 WR | Jean Bouin; France | 14:36.7 | George Hutson; Great Britain | 15:07.6 |
| 10,000 metres | Hannes Kolehmainen; Finland | 31:20.8 OR | Lewis Tewanima; United States | 32:06.6 | Albin Stenroos; Finland | 32:21.8 |
| 110 metres hurdles | Fred Kelly; United States | 15.1 | James Wendell; United States | 15.2 | Martin Hawkins; United States | 15.3 |
| 4 × 100 m relay | Great Britain; Willie Applegarth; Victor d'Arcy; David Jacobs; Henry Macintosh | 42.4 | Sweden; Knut Lindberg; Charles Luther; Ivan Möller; Ture Person | 42.6 | none awarded | |
| 4 × 400 metres relay | United States; Edward Lindberg; Ted Meredith; Charles Reidpath; Mel Sheppard | 3:16.6 WR | France; Pierre Failliot; Charles Lelong; Charles Poulenard; Robert Schurrer | 3:20.7 | Great Britain; Ernest Henley; George Nicol; Cyril Seedhouse; James Soutter | 3:23.2 |
| 3000 metres team race | United States; Tell Berna; George Bonhag; Abel Kiviat; Louis Scott; Norman Taber | 9 pts | Sweden; Bror Fock; Nils Frykberg; Thorild Olsson; Ernst Wide; John Zander | 13 pts | Great Britain; Joe Cottrill; George Hutson; William Moore; Edward Owen; Cyril Porter | 23 pts |
| Marathon | Ken McArthur; South Africa | 2:36:54.8 OR | Christian Gitsham; South Africa | 2:37:52.0 | Gaston Strobino; United States | 2:38:42.4 |
| 10 kilometres walk | George Goulding; Canada | 46:28.4 | Ernest Webb; Great Britain | 46:50.4 | Fernando Altimani; Italy | 47:37.6 |
| Individual cross country | Hannes Kolehmainen; Finland | 45:11.6 | Hjalmar Andersson; Sweden | 45:44.8 | John Eke; Sweden | 46:37.6 |
| Team cross country | Sweden; Hjalmar Andersson; John Eke; Josef Ternström | 10 pts | Finland; Jalmari Eskola; Hannes Kolehmainen; Albin Stenroos | 11 pts | Great Britain; Ernest Glover; Frederick Hibbins; Thomas Humphreys | 49 pts |
| Long jump | Albert Gutterson; United States | 7.60 m OR | Calvin Bricker; Canada | 7.21 m | Georg Åberg; Sweden | 7.18 m |
| Triple jump | Gustaf Lindblom; Sweden | 14.76 m | Georg Åberg; Sweden | 14.51 m | Erik Almlöf; Sweden | 14.17 m |
| High jump | Alma Richards; United States | 1.93 m OR | Hans Liesche; Germany | 1.91 m | George Horine; United States | 1.89 m |
| Pole vault | Harry Babcock; United States | 3.95 m OR | Frank Nelson; United States Marc Wright; United States | 3.85 m | William Halpenny; Canada Frank Murphy; United States Bertil Uggla; Sweden | 3.80 m |
| Standing long jump | Konstantinos Tsiklitiras; Greece | 3.37 m | Platt Adams; United States | 3.36 m | Benjamin Adams; United States | 3.28 m |
| Standing high jump | Platt Adams; United States | 1.63 m | Benjamin Adams; United States | 1.60 m | Konstantinos Tsiklitiras; Greece | 1.55 m |
| Shot put | Pat McDonald; United States | 15.34 m OR | Ralph Rose; United States | 15.25 m | Lawrence Whitney; United States | 13.93 m |
| Discus throw | Armas Taipale; Finland | 45.21 m OR | Richard Byrd; United States | 42.32 m | James Duncan; United States | 42.28 m |
| Hammer throw | Matt McGrath; United States | 54.74 m OR | Duncan Gillis; Canada | 48.39 m | Clarence Childs; United States | 48.17 m |
| Javelin throw | Eric Lemming; Sweden | 60.64 m OR | Julius Saaristo; Finland | 58.66 m | Mór Kóczán; Hungary | 55.50 m |
| Two handed shot put | Ralph Rose; United States | 15.23 + 12.47 = 27.70 m | Pat McDonald; United States | 15.08 + 12.45 = 27.53 m | Elmer Niklander; Finland | 14.71 + 12.43 = 27.14 m |
| Two handed discus throw | Armas Taipale; Finland | 44.68 + 38.18 = 82.86 m | Elmer Niklander; Finland | 40.28 + 37.68 = 77.96 m | Emil Magnusson; Sweden | 40.58 + 36.79 = 77.37 m |
| Two handed javelin throw | Julius Saaristo; Finland | 61.00 + 48.42 = 109.42 m | Väinö Siikaniemi; Finland | 54.09 + 47.04 = 101.13 m | Urho Peltonen; Finland | 53.58 + 46.66 = 100.24 m |
| Pentathlon | Jim Thorpe; United States | 7 pts | Ferdinand Bie; Norway | 16 pts | Frank Lukeman; Canada | 24 pts |
| Pentathlon | Jim Thorpe; United States | 7 pts | James Donahue; United States | 24 pts (Note: The tie between Donahue and Lukeman was broken by calculating each athlete's score on the decathlon table, originally deciding between a bronze medal and fourth place. Donahue won, 3475.865 points to 3396.975 points, to take the bronze medal. Thorpe's disqualification in 1913 resulted in Bie being awarded the gold medal, while Donahue and Lukeman moved up to silver and bronze, respectively. When Thorpe's results were reinstated 70 years later, his gold medal status was returned while the other three athletes kept their upgraded placings—resulting in two gold medalists. In 2022, the IOC reinstated Thorpe as the sole winner of the gold medal, and named Bie a co-winner of silver alongside Donahue.) | Frank Lukeman; Canada | 24 pts |
| Decathlon | Jim Thorpe; United States | 8412.955 pts (Note: Total as given in Wudarski. A sum of the scores given by formula gives a total of 8412.995 points.) | Hugo Wieslander; Sweden | 7724.495 pts | Gösta Holmér; Sweden | 7347.855 pts |
| Decathlon | Jim Thorpe; United States | 8412.955 pts | Charles Lomberg; Sweden | 7413.510 pts (Note: Thorpe's disqualification in 1913 and subsequent reinstatement 70 years later resulted in there being awarded two gold, one silver, and one bronze medals awarded. The IOC's 2022 decision to reinstate Thorpe as sole gold medallist resulted changed it to one gold, two silver, and one bronze.) | Gösta Holmér; Sweden | 7347.855 pts |

== Medal table ==
| Rank | Nation | Gold | Silver | Bronze | Total |
|---|---|---|---|---|---|
| 1 | United States | 16 | 14 | 12 | 42 |
| 2 | Finland | 6 | 4 | 3 | 13 |
| 3 | Sweden | 3 | 6 | 6 | 15 |
| 4 | Great Britain | 2 | 1 | 5 | 8 |
| 5 | Canada | 1 | 2 | 2 | 5 |
| 6 | South Africa | 1 | 1 | 0 | 2 |
| 7 | Greece | 1 | 0 | 1 | 2 |
| 8 | France | 0 | 2 | 0 | 2 |
| 8 | Germany | 0 | 2 | 0 | 2 |
| 10 | Norway | 0 | 1 | 0 | 1 |
| 11 | Hungary | 0 | 0 | 1 | 1 |
| 11 | Italy | 0 | 0 | 1 | 1 |
| Totals (12 entries) | | 30 | 33 | 31 | 94 |

== Participating nations ==
556 athletes from 27 nations competed. Egypt was the only nation not to compete in athletics.

- Australasia (5)
- Austria (12)
- Belgium (2)
- Bohemia (11)
- Canada (18)
- Chile (6)
- Denmark (14)
- Finland (23)
- France (32)

- Germany (24)
- Great Britain (65)
- Greece (5)
- Hungary (27)
- Iceland (1)
- Italy (14)
- Japan (2)
- Luxembourg (2)
- Netherlands (1)

- Norway (23)
- Portugal (4)
- Russia (35)
- Serbia (3)
- South Africa (7)
- Sweden (108)
- Switzerland (1)
- Turkey (2)
- United States (109)
