= Athletics at the 1912 Summer Olympics – Men's 5000 metres =

Men's 5000 metres at the Games of the V Olympiad
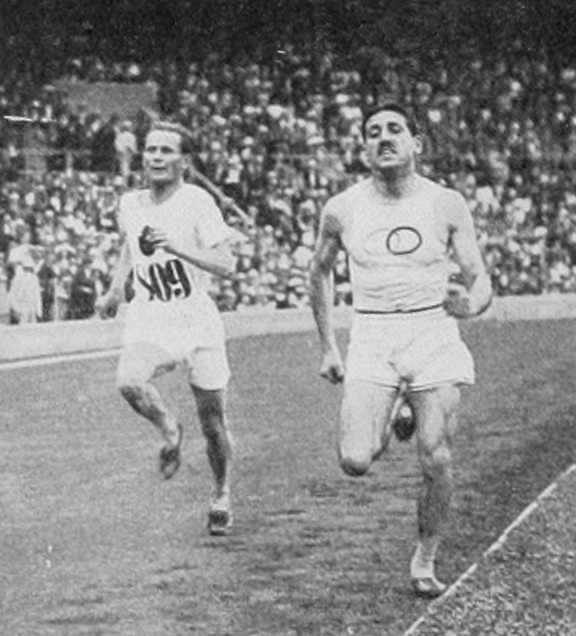
- The finish: Kolehmainen on the way to pass Bouin who is still in the lead.
- Venue: Stockholm Olympic Stadium
- Dates: July 9, 1912 (semifinals); July 10, 1912 (final)
- Competitors: 31 from 11 nations

Medalists
1st place, gold medalist(s)		Hannes Kolehmainen	Finland
2nd place, silver medalist(s)		Jean Bouin	France
3rd place, bronze medalist(s)		George Hutson	Great Britain

The men's 5000 metres was a track and field athletics event held as part of the Athletics at the 1912 Summer Olympics programme. It was the debut of the event, which along with the 10000 metre event replaced the 5 mile race held at the 1908 Summer Olympics. The competition was held on Tuesday, July 9, 1912, and on Wednesday, July 10, 1912. Thirty-one long-distance runners from eleven nations competed. NOCs could enter up to 12 athletes.

== Records ==
These were the standing world and Olympic records (in minutes) prior to the 1912 Summer Olympics.

World record	14:59.0(*)	(United Kingdom) Alfred Shrubb	Glasgow (GBR)	June 13, 1904
Olympic record	-	none	-	-

(*) unofficial

George Bonhag, in winning the first semifinal, which was the first Olympic 5000 ever, set the Olympic record at 15:22.6. It lasted until the 5th and last semifinal, in which Jean Bouin broke it by finishing in 15:05.0. Unsurprisingly, that record stood only until the next race—Hannes Kolehmainen won the final at 14:36.6 as both he and Bouin (just behind Kolehmainen, at 14:36.7) surpassed the best time of the semifinals. This record became the first official world record for the 5000 metres.

== Results ==
=== Semifinals ===
All semi-finals were held on Tuesday, July 9, 1912.

==== Semifinal 1 ====
Place	Athlete	Time	Qual.
1	George Bonhag (USA)	15:22.6 OR	QF
2	Alex Decoteau (CAN)	15:24.2	QF
3	Frederick Hibbins (GBR)	15:27.6	QF
4	George Hill (ANZ)	15:56.8	
—	Klas Lundström (SWE)	Did not finish	

==== Semifinal 2 ====
Place	Athlete	Time	Qual.
1	Louis Scott (USA)	15:23.5	QF
2	Joe Keeper (CAN)	15:28.9	QF
3	George Hutson (GBR)	15:29.0	QF
4	Bror Modigh (SWE)	16:07.1	
—	Eddie Fitzgerald (USA)	Did not finish	
—	Martin Persson (SWE)	Did not finish	
—	Charles Ruffell (GBR)	Did not finish	

==== Semifinal 3 ====
Place	Athlete	Time	Qual.
1	Mauritz Carlsson (SWE)	15:34.6	QF
2	Ernest Glover (GBR)	16:09.1	QF
3	Cyril Porter (GBR)	16:23.4	QF
4	Mikhail Nikolsky (RUS)	17:21.7	
—	Aarne Lindholm (FIN)	Did not finish	
—	Garnett Wikoff (USA)	Did not finish	

==== Semifinal 4 ====
Place	Athlete	Time	Qual.
1	Hannes Kolehmainen (FIN)	15:38.9	QF
2	Henrik Nordström (SWE)	15:49.1	QF
3	Tell Berna (USA)	15:53.3	QF
4	George Lee (GBR)		
—	Gregor Vietz (GER)	Did not finish	

==== Semifinal 5 ====
Place	Athlete	Time	Qual.
1	Jean Bouin (FRA)	15:05.0 OR	QF
2	Thorild Olsson (SWE)	15:25.2	QF
3	Viljam Johansson (FIN)	15:31.4	QF
—	Gaston Heuet (FRA)	Did not finish	
—	Wallace McCurdy (USA)	Did not finish	
—	Alfonso Orlando (ITA)	Did not finish	
—	Alfonso Sánchez (CHI)	Did not finish	
—	Arnold Treble (GBR)	Did not finish	

=== Final ===
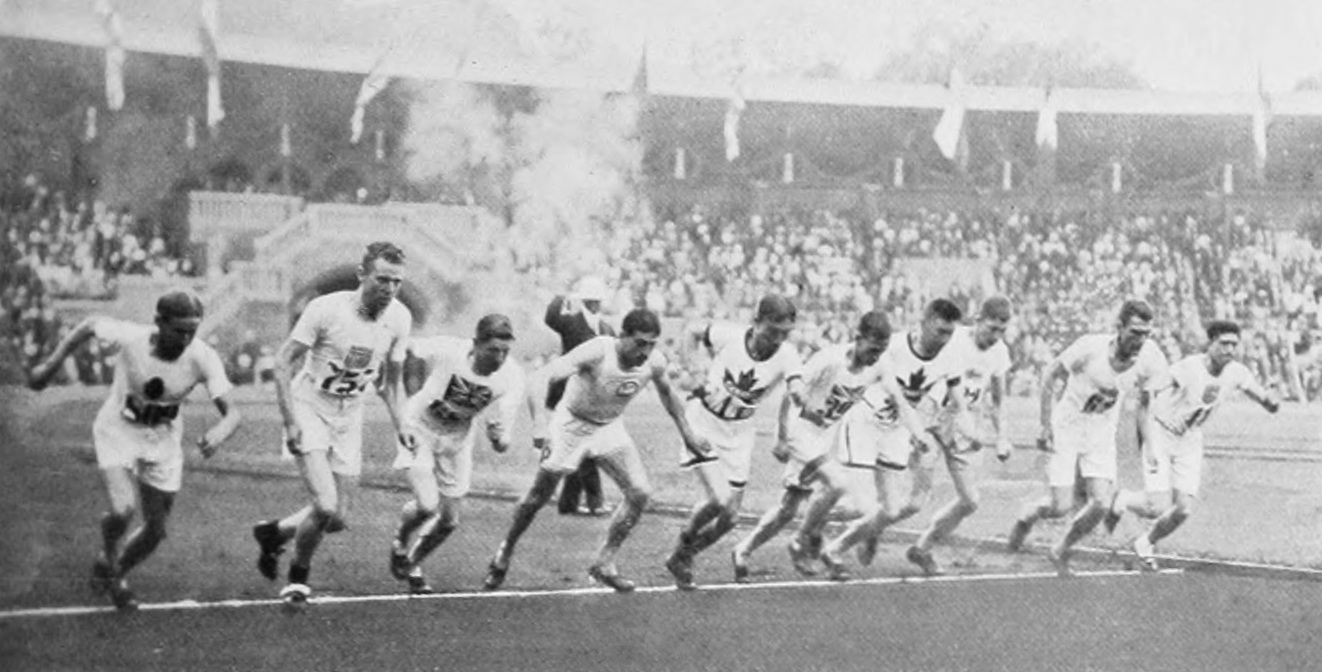
The start of the final.

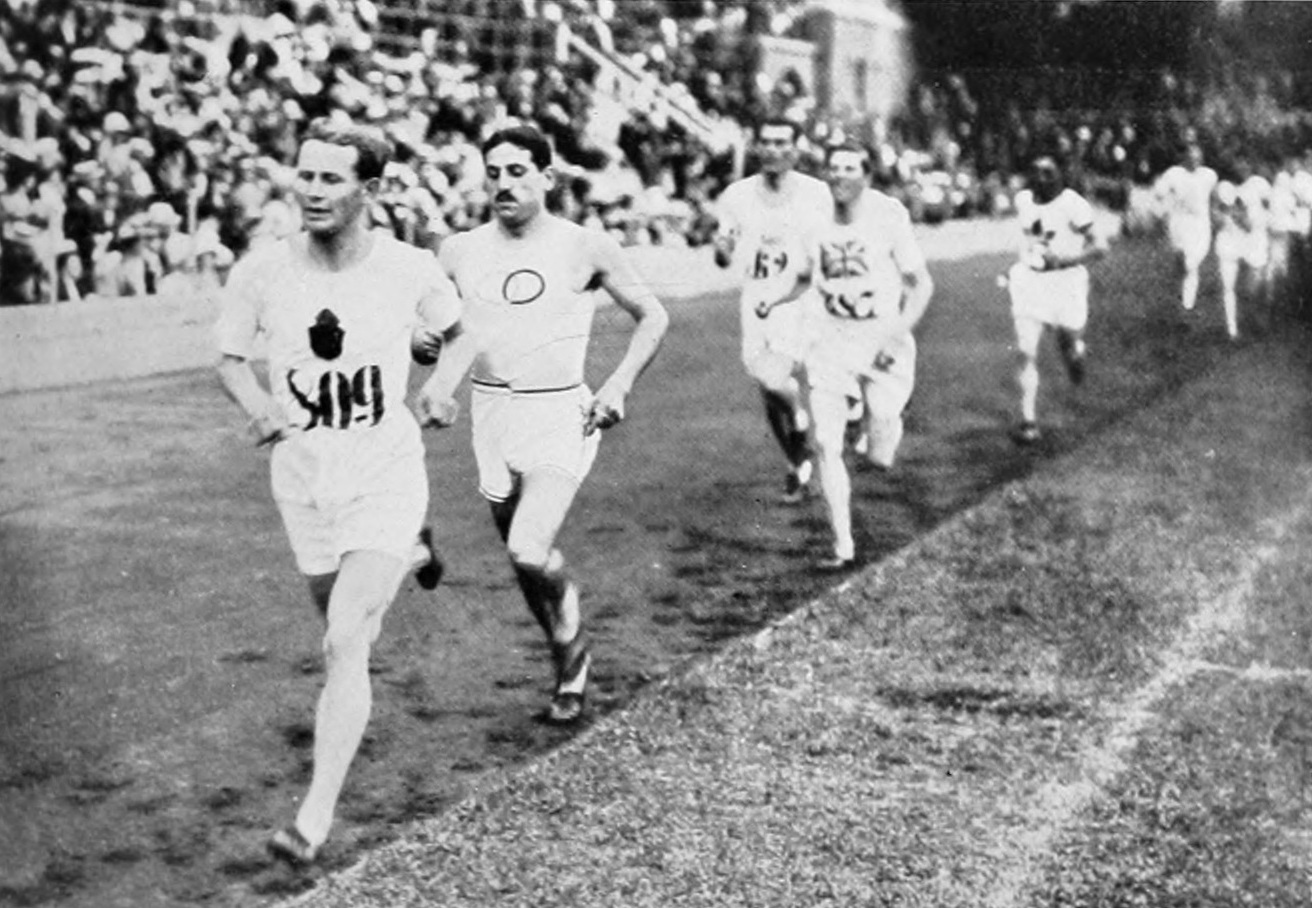
The upcoming winner Hannes Kolehmainen in the lead with Jean Bouin behind.

The final was held on Wednesday, July 10, 1912.

Place	Athlete	Time
1	Hannes Kolehmainen (FIN)	14:36.6 WR
2	Jean Bouin (FRA)	14:36.7
3	George Hutson (GBR)	15:07.6
4	George Bonhag (USA)	15:09.8
5	Tell Berna (USA)	15:10.0
6	Alex Decoteau (CAN)	
7	Mauritz Carlsson (SWE)	15:18.6
8-11	Frederick Hibbins (GBR)	
8-11	Joe Keeper (CAN)	
8-11	Cyril Porter (GBR)	
8-11	Louis Scott (USA)	
—	Ernest Glover (GBR)	Did not start
—	Viljam Johansson (FIN)	Did not start
—	Henrik Nordström (SWE)	Did not start
—	Thorild Olsson (SWE)	Did not start

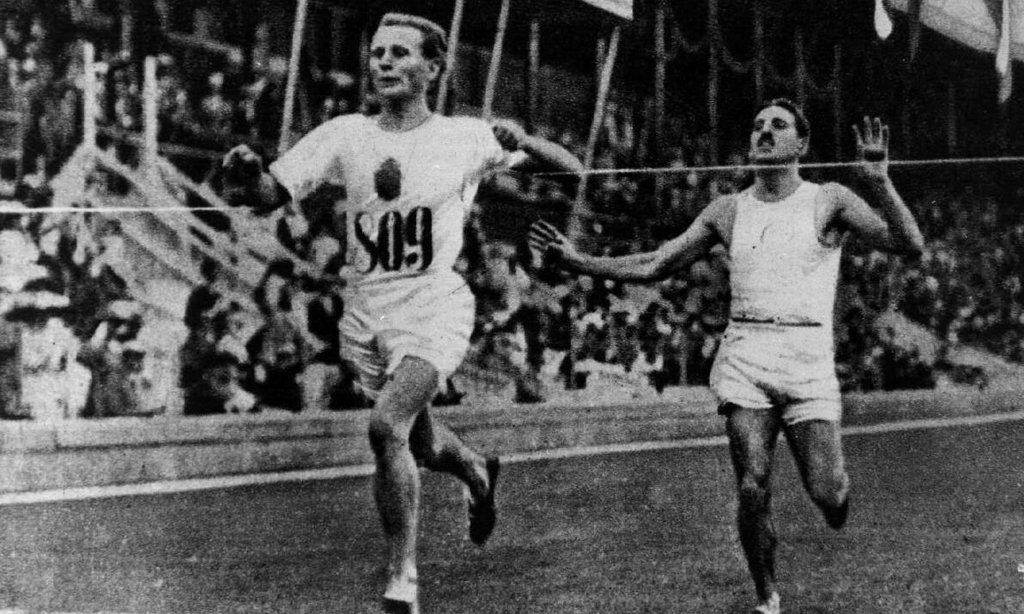
Finish

== Notes ==
- Bergvall, Erik, ed. (1913). The Official Report of the Olympic Games of Stockholm 1912. Translated by Adams-Ray, Edward. Stockholm: Wahlström & Widstrand.
- Wudarski, Pawel (1999). "Wyniki Igrzysk Olimpijskich" (in Polish).
