= Dicksonpokalen =

Swedish athletics award

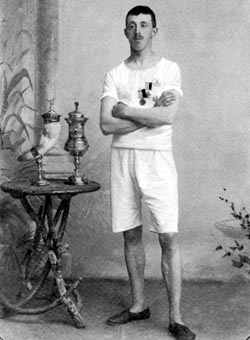
Patrik Löfgren with the trophy in 1891

The Dicksonpokalen (lit. 'the Dickson Trophy') is an annual athletics award given to the winner of the 1500 metres event at the DN Galan (now known as BAUHAUS-galan) meeting in Stockholm, Sweden.

The award was created by James F. Dickson, a stable master or equerry for the royal court. Dickson had previously given an award for the best runner of the English mile as part of a public sports festival in Gothenburg as early as 1887. A Swede, H. Lönnroth, was the first known winner of the award with a time of six minutes and two seconds, competing against one other man in heavy rain. No trophy was provided to Lönnroth given the lack of competition and slow performance. The first trophy proper was given in 1891 as part of the sports festival at the Svea Life Guards sports ground. Hans Haugom, a Norwegian, won the event and returned to win again the following year. Patrik Löfgren of Sweden won three years in a row from 1892 to 1894 and was awarded the trophy permanently as a result.

The current trophy traces its history to 1895 and is no longer permanently awarded to an athlete, but the athlete has their name engraved on the award instead. Taking on an international aspect, the competition was open to all runners from the Nordic countries. Since 1906, the winning athlete's club gained the right to host the following year's competition. The race remained among the foremost annual athletics events in the region until the early 1920s. With diminishing interest, the management of the competition was given to the Swedish Athletics Association, who awarded it to the winner of the men's 1500 m at the annual Swedish Athletics Championships.

In the post-war era, the trophy returned to its roots as an international mile run event and Dutchman Willem Slijkhuis became the first non-Nordic winner in 1948. The trophy became tied to the annual DN Galan athletics meeting in Stockholm when it started in 1967. The distance was changed from the mile to 1500 m in 1981. Since its residency at the DN Galan, numerous high-profile middle-distance athletes have won the title, including Olympic champions Kipchoge Keino, John Walker, Sebastian Coe, Steve Ovett, Saïd Aouita, Noureddine Morceli, Hicham El Guerrouj and Kenenisa Bekele.

A new era for the trophy began in 2010 with the first women's winner, Nancy Langat of Kenya. Since that year, the Dicksonpokalen has been awarded to women in even-numbered years and men in odd-numbered years.

== Winners ==
Year	Country	Winner (club)	Time	Distance
1891^{1}	Norway	Hans Haugom	5:07.0	Mile
1891^{2}	Norway	Hans Haugom	4:48.8	Mile
1892	Sweden	Patrik Löfgren (AIK)	4:43.4	Mile
1893	Sweden	Patrik Löfgren (AIK)	4:48.8	Mile
1894	Sweden	Patrik Löfgren (AIK)	4:52.4	Mile
1895	Sweden	Oscar Johansson (Vårblomman)	4:55.4	Mile
1896	Sweden	Patrik Löfgren (AIK)	4:44.8	Mile
1897	Denmark	Axel Valdemar Hansen (Københavns FF)	5:01.0	Mile
1898	Denmark	Poul Harboe-Christensen (Københavns FF)	4:54.4	Mile
1899	Denmark	Christian Christensen (Københavns FF)	4:50.8	Mile
1900	Denmark	Christian Christensen (Københavns FF)	4:44.6	Mile
1901	Sweden	Kristian Hellström (IF Sleipner)	4:42.2	Mile
1902	Sweden	Kristian Hellström (IF Sleipner)	4:42.2	Mile
1903	Sweden	Kristian Hellström (IF Sleipner)	4:31.8	Mile
1904	Sweden	Kristian Hellström (IF Sleipner)	4:40.4	Mile
1905	Sweden	Edward Dahl (Sundbybergs IK)	4:52.8	Mile
1906	Sweden	Edward Dahl (Sundbyberg)	4:34.6	Mile
1907	Sweden	John Svanberg (Fredrikshofs IF)	4:31.2	Mile
1908	Sweden	Anton Nilsson (Fredrikshof)	4:37.6	Mile
1909	Sweden	Ernst Wide (IK Göta)	4:33.2	Mile
1910	Sweden	Ernst Wide (IK Göta)	4:21.6	Mile
1911	Sweden	Ernst Wide (IK Göta)	4:34.7	Mile
1912	Sweden	Ernst Wide (IK Göta)	4:26.8	Mile
1913	Sweden	Ernst Wide (IK Göta)	4:25.4	Mile
1914	Sweden	Ernst Wide (IK Göta)	4:36.3	Mile
1915	Sweden	John Zander (Mariebergs IK)	4:27.7	Mile
1916	Sweden	John Zander (Marieberg)	4:22.3	Mile
1917	Sweden	John Zander (Marieberg)	4:18.6	Mile
1918	Sweden	John Zander (Marieberg)	4:16.8	Mile
1919	Sweden	Sven Lundgren (IK Göta)	4:22.8	Mile
1920	Sweden	Sven Lundgren (IK Göta)	4:25.4	Mile
1921	Finland	Paavo Nurmi	4:13.9	Mile
1922	Sweden	Sven Lundgren (IK Göta)	4:24.2	Mile
1923	Sweden	Edvin Wide (IF Linnéa)	4:25.0	Mile
1924	Sweden	Edvin Wide (IF Linnéa)	4:25.8	Mile
1925	Sweden	Folke Eriksson (MP)	4:25.2	Mile
1926	Sweden	Gunnar Sjögren (IFK Sundsvall)	4:15.9	Mile
1927	Sweden	Nils Eklöf (Finspångs IK)	4:22.2	Mile
1928	Sweden	Artur Svensson (Finspång)	4:24.7	Mile
1929	Sweden	Bror Öhrn (IFK Borås)	4:00.4	1500 m
1930	Sweden	Karl-Gustav Dahlström (IK Göta)	4:07.6	1500 m
1931	Sweden	Eric Ny (IK Mode)	3:58.8	1500 m
1932	Sweden	Alfons Holmgren (IF Elfsborg)	4:04.2	1500 m
1933	Sweden	Alfons Holmgren (IF Elfsborg)	3:58.2	1500 m
1934	Sweden	Olle Pettersson (IK Ymer)	3:57.0	1500 m
1935	Sweden	Lennart Nilsson (Örgryte IS)	3:59.8	1500 m
1936	Sweden	Henry Jonsson (SoIK Hellas)	3:57.0	1500 m
1937	Sweden	Lennart Nilsson (Örgryte)	3:54.2	1500 m
1938	Sweden	Åke Jansson (Brandkårens IK)	3:53.0	1500 m
1939	Sweden	Åke Jansson (Brandkåren)	3:55.6	1500 m
1940	Sweden	Henry Kälarne (Brandkåren)	3:52.4	1500 m
1941	Sweden	Gunder Hägg (Gefle IF)	3:47.6	1500 m
1942	Sweden	Åke Jansson (Brandkåren)	3:50.6	1500 m
1943	Sweden	Arne Andersson (SoIK Hellas)	3:50.4	1500 m
1944	Sweden	Arne Andersson (SoIK Hellas)	3:49.6	1500 m
1945	Sweden	Lennart Strand (Malmö AI)	3:47.6	1500 m
1946	Sweden	Lennart Strand (Malmö)	4:06.6	Mile
1947	Sweden	Lennart Strand (Malmö)	4:07.0	Mile
1948	Netherlands	Willem Slijkhuis	4:09.4	Mile
1949	Sweden	Olle Åberg (Gefle IF)	4:05.4	Mile
1950	Sweden	Lennart Strand (Malmö)	4:07.2	Mile
1951	Sweden	Olle Åberg (Gefle IF)	4:08.8	Mile
1952	Belgium	Gaston Reiff	4:03.4	Mile
1953	United States	Wes Santee	4:06.6	Mile
1954	Sweden	Ingvar Ericsson (Brandkåren)	4:09.8	Mile
1955	United States	Fred Dwyer	4:07.8	Mile
1956	Sweden	Ingvar Ericsson (Brandkåren)	4:14.6	Mile
1957	Sweden	Dan Waern (Örgryte)	4:01.1	Mile
1958	Australia	Herb Elliott	3:58.0	Mile
1959	Sweden	Dan Waern (Örgryte)	3:59.2	Mile
1960	Hungary	László Tábori	4:06.4	Mile
1961	Sweden	Dan Waern (Örgryte)	3:58.9	Mile
1962	Sweden	Tommy Holmestrand (IFK Lidingö)	4:06.6	Mile
1963	West Germany	Jörg Balke	4:11.4	Mile
1964	Sweden	Karl-Uno Olofsson (IFK Umeå)	4:02.6	Mile
1965	Czechoslovakia	Josef Odložil	3:58.7	Mile
1966	Sweden	Sven-Olov Larsson (IFK Sundsvall)	4:07.1	Mile
1967	Belgium	André Dehertoghe	3:57.3	Mile
1968	West Germany	Bodo Tümmler	3:54.7	Mile
1969	West Germany	Bodo Tümmler	3:58.8	Mile
1970	Poland	Henryk Szordykowski	4:02.3	Mile
1971	Kenya	Kipchoge Keino	3:54.4	Mile
1972	United Kingdom	Brendan Foster	3:57.2	Mile
1973	Kenya	Ben Jipcho	3:52.17	Mile
1974	Tanzania	Filbert Bayi	3:54.10	Mile
1975	New Zealand	John Walker	3:52.24	Mile
1976	New Zealand	John Walker	3:53.07	Mile
1977	Czechoslovakia	Jozef Plachý	3:54.68	Mile
1978	West Germany	Thomas Wessinghage	3:52.50	Mile
1979	United States	Steve Scott	3:55.96	Mile
1980	United States	Steve Scott	3:53.59	Mile
1981	United Kingdom	Sebastian Coe	3:31.95	1500 m
1982	United States	Sydney Maree	3:32.89	1500 m
1983	United States	Jim Spivey	3:36.94	1500 m
1984	United Kingdom	Steve Ovett	3:35.65	1500 m
1985	United States	Steve Scott	3:37.30	1500 m
1986	Australia	Michael Hillardt	3:34.51	1500 m
1987	Somalia	Abdi Bile	3:35.77	1500 m
1988	Morocco	Saïd Aouita	3:35.70	1500 m
1989	Morocco	Saïd Aouita	3:34.59	1500 m
1990	United States	Joe Falcon	3:35.52	1500 m
1991	Algeria	Noureddine Morceli	3:31.01	1500 m
1992	Morocco	Rachid El Basir	3:36.21	1500 m
1993	Algeria	Noureddine Morceli	3:31.83	1500 m
1994	Algeria	Noureddine Morceli	3:34.09	1500 m
1995	No race			
1996	Morocco	Hicham El Guerrouj	3:29.59	1500 m
1997	Morocco	Hicham El Guerrouj	3:29.30	1500 m
1998	Kenya	John Kibowen	3:51.32	Mile
1999	Kenya	Noah Ngeny	4:50.08	2000 m
2000	Spain	Andrés Manuel Díaz	3:32.75	1500 m
2001	Spain	José Antonio Redolat	3:31.21	1500 m
2002	Kenya	Bernard Lagat	3:31.38	1500 m
2003	Kenya	Bernard Lagat	3:32.99	1500 m
2004	Ethiopia	Mulugeta Wendimu	3:32.39	1500 m
2005	Ukraine	Ivan Heshko	3:33.18	1500 m
2006	Ethiopia	Kenenisa Bekele	3:33.08	1500 m
2007	Bahrain	Belal Mansoor Ali	2:15.88	1000 m
2008	Sudan	Abubaker Kaki Khamis	2:13.93	1000 m
2009	Bahrain	Belal Mansoor Ali	2:16.55	1000 m
2010	Kenya	Nancy Langat	4:00.70	1500 m
2011	Kenya	Silas Kiplagat	3:33.94	1500 m
2012	Bahrain	Maryam Yusuf Jamal	4:01.19	1500 m
2013	Djibouti	Ayanleh Souleiman	3:33.59	1500 m
2014	United States	Jenny Simpson	4:00.38	1500 m
2015	Djibouti	Ayanleh Souleiman	3:33.33	1500 m
2016	Poland	Angelika Cichocka	4:03.25	1500 m
2017	Kenya	Timothy Cheruiyot	3:30.77	1500 m
2018	Ethiopia	Gudaf Tsegay	3:57.64	1500 m
2019	Kenya	Timothy Cheruiyot	3:35.79	1500 m

== See also ==
- Dream Mile
- Emsley Carr Mile
- Wanamaker Mile
