= Athletics at the 1912 Summer Olympics – Men's 3000 metres team race =

Athletics at the Olympics

Men's 3000 metres team race at the Games of the V Olympiad
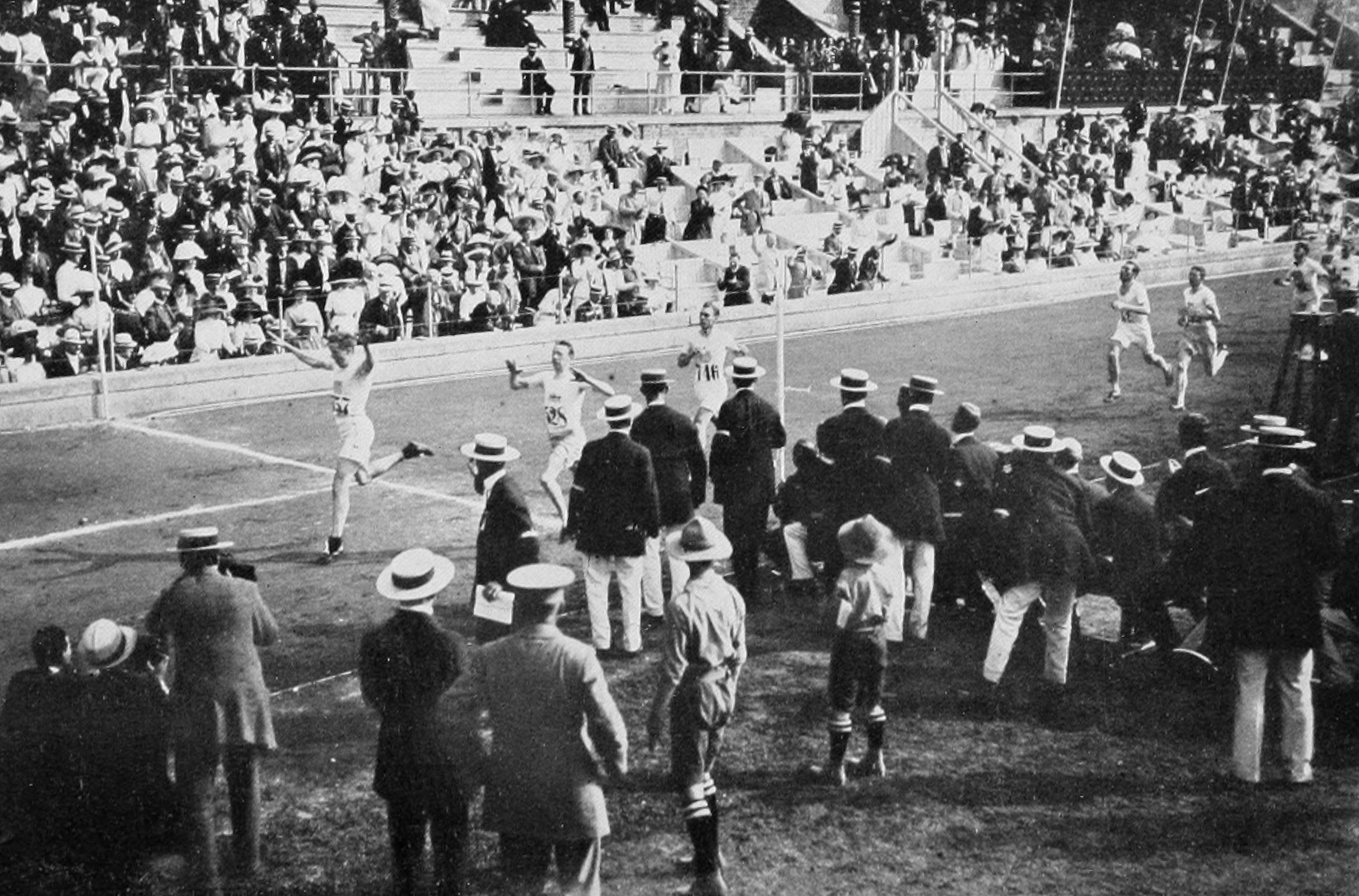
- Crossing the finish line in the final
- Venue: Stockholm Olympic Stadium
- Dates: July 12, 1912 (semifinals); July 13, 1912 (final)
- Competitors: 24 from 5 nations

Medalists
1st place, gold medalist(s)		Tell Berna, George Bonhag, Abel Kiviat, Louis Scott, Norman Taber; United States
2nd place, silver medalist(s)		Bror Fock, Nils Frykberg, Thorild Olsson, Ernst Wide, John Zander; Sweden
3rd place, bronze medalist(s)		Joe Cottrill, George Hutson, William Moore, Edward Owen, Cyril Porter; Great Britain

The men's 3000 metres team race was a track and field athletics event held as part of the athletics at the 1912 Summer Olympics programme. It was the fourth appearance of a team race style event, though the first to be held at the distance of 3000 metres, which became the standard until the event was eliminated following the 1924 Summer Olympics. The competition was held on Friday, July 12, 1912, and on Saturday, July 13, 1912.

Twenty-four runners from five nations competed. NOCs could enter 1 team of 5 athletes, with up to 3 reserves.

According to the International Olympic Committee medal database all five runners were awarded medals.

== Records ==
The world record in the individual 3000 metres run was held by Bror Fock of Sweden in a time of 8:46.6.

World record	Bror Fock (SWE)	8:46.6	Stockholm	24 May 1912
Olympic record	N/A			

The record was broken in the first semifinal by Johannes Kolehmainen with a time of 8:36.9, which would be named as the first official record recognized by the IAAF.

== Results ==
=== Semifinals ===
All three semi-finals were held on Friday, July 12, 1912.

==== Semifinal 1 ====
Team result:

Place	Team	Scores				Qual.
Place	Team	1	2	3	Total	Qual.
1	United States	2	3	4	9	Q
2	Finland	1	5	6	12	

Individual race result:

Place	Athlete	Time	Score
1	Hannes Kolehmainen (FIN)	8:36.9	1
2	Abel Kiviat (USA)	8:46.3	2
3	Tell Berna (USA)	8:50.2	3
4	Norman Taber (USA)	8:51.1	4
5	George Bonhag (USA)	8:52.2	—
6	Louis Scott (USA)	8:53.4	—
7	Albin Stenroos (FIN)	8:54.1	5
8	Viljam Johansson (FIN)	8:57.2	6
9	Aarne Lindholm (FIN)	9:46.4	—
10	Efraim Harju (FIN)	10:10.6	—

==== Semifinal 2 ====
Team result:

Place	Team	Scores				Qual.
Place	Team	1	2	3	Total	Qual.
1	Sweden	2	3	4	9	Q
2	Germany	1	5	6	12	

Individual race result:

All five Swedish runners finished side by side.

Place	Athlete	Time	Score
1	Erwin von Sigel (GER)	9:06.8	1
2	Bror Fock (SWE)	9:14.7	2
2	Nils Frykberg (SWE)	9:14.7	3
2	Ernst Wide (SWE)	9:14.7	4
2	Thorild Olsson (SWE)	9:14.7	—
2	John Zander (SWE)	9:14.7	—
7	Georg Amberger (GER)	9:32.5	5
8	Gregor Vietz (GER)	9:34.2	6
—	Georg Mickler (GER)	DNF	—

==== Semifinal 3 ====
Great Britain had a walkover.

Team result:

Place	Team	Scores				Qual.
Place	Team	1	2	3	Total	Qual.
1	Great Britain	1	2	3	6	Q

Individual race result:

As there was no competition all five British runners ran and finished side by side.

Place	Athlete	Time	Score
1	Cyril Porter (GBR)	10:21.6	1
1	Edward Owen (GBR)	10:21.6	2
1	William Moore (GBR)	10:21.6	3
1	George Hutson (GBR)	10:21.6	—
1	Joe Cottrill (GBR)	10:21.6	—

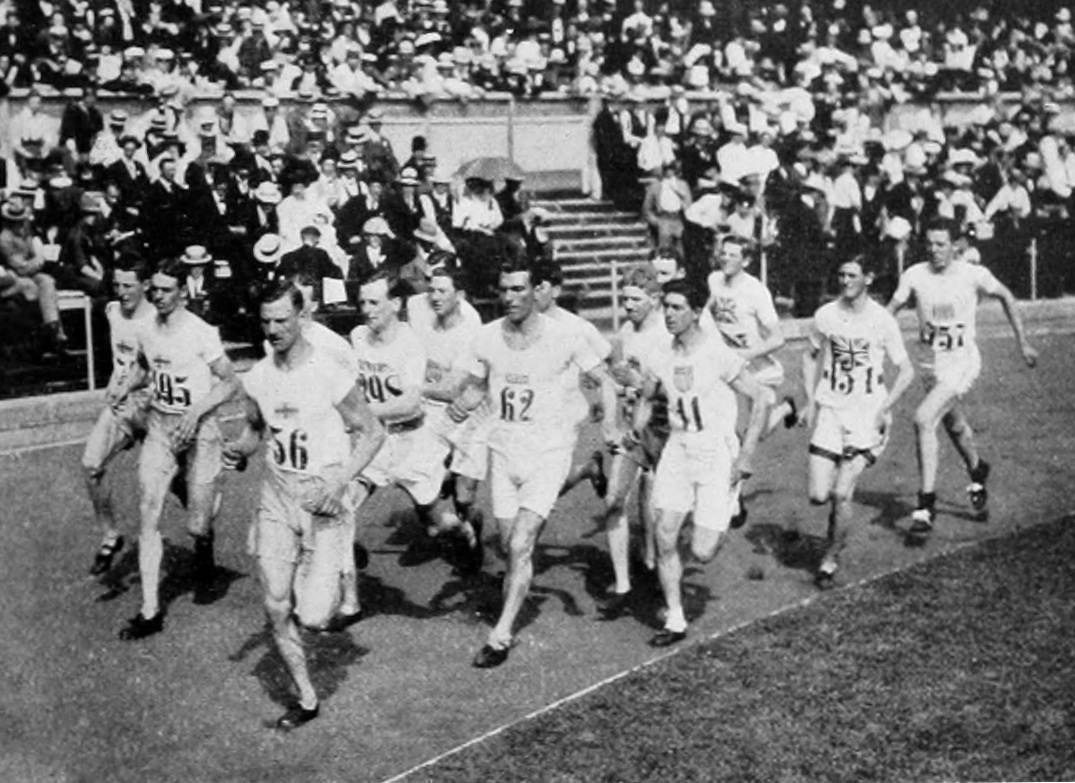
The final: Immediately after the start

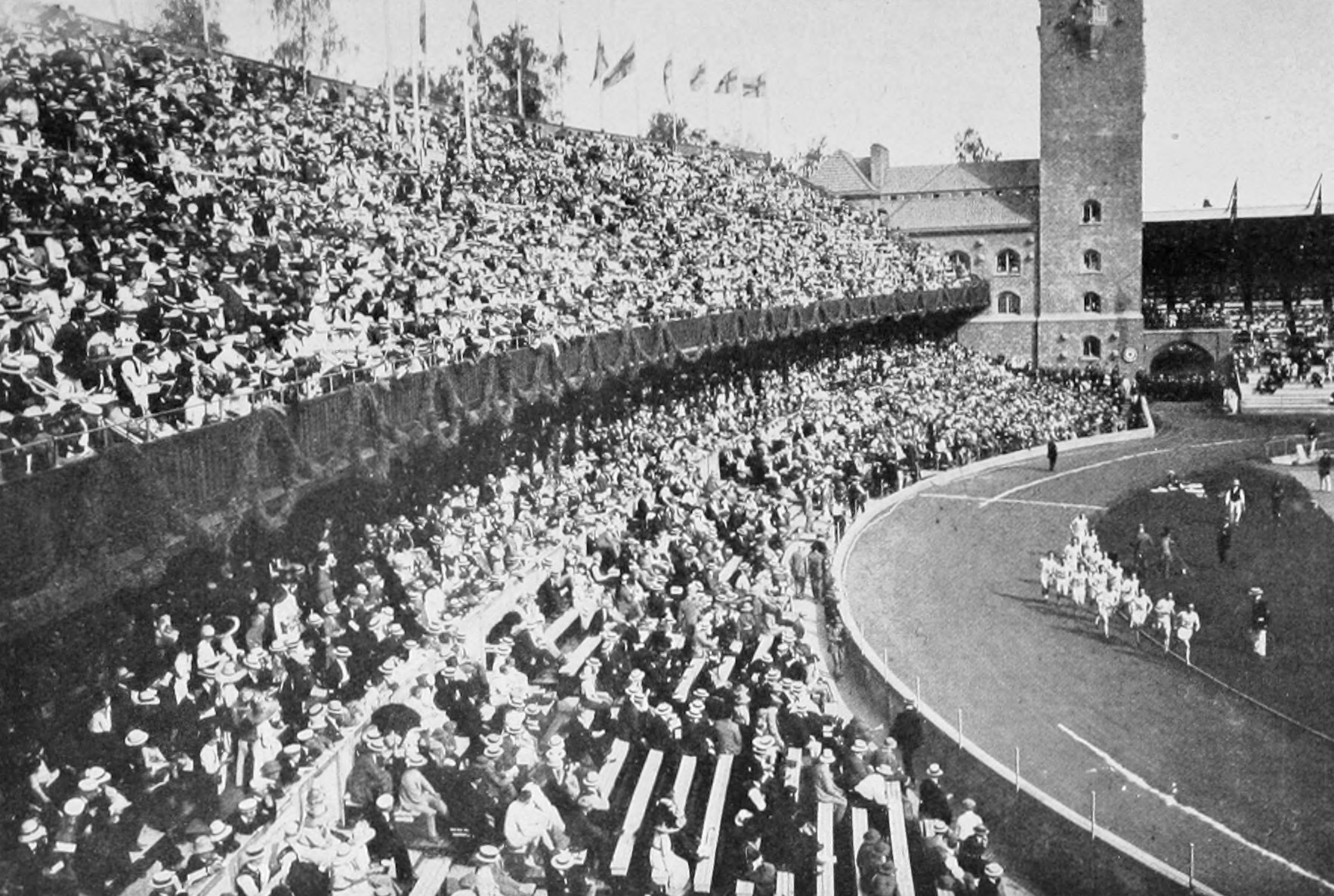
The final under way

=== Final ===
The final was held on Saturday, July 13, 1912.

Team result:

Place	Team	Scores			
Place	Team	1	2	3	Total
1	United States	1	3	5	9
2	Sweden	2	4	7	13
3	Great Britain	6	8	9	23

Individual race result:

Place	Athlete	Time	Score
1	Tell Berna (USA)	8:44.6	1
2	Thorild Olsson (SWE)	8:44.6	2
3	Norman Taber (USA)	8:45.2	3
4	Ernst Wide (SWE)	8:46.2	4
5	George Bonhag (USA)	8:46.6	5
6	Joe Cottrill (GBR)	8:46.8	6
7	Bror Fock (SWE)	8:47.2	7
8	George Hutson (GBR)	8:47.2	8
9	Cyril Porter (GBR)	8:48.0	9
10	John Zander (SWE)	8:48.9	—
11	Nils Frykberg (SWE)	8:49.0	—
12	Edward Owen (GBR)		—
—	Abel Kiviat (USA)	DNF	—
—	William Moore (GBR)	DNF	—
—	Louis Scott (USA)	DNF	—
