= Garnett Wikoff =

American long-distance runner

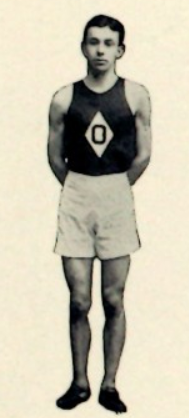
- Wikoff in 1911

Personal information
- Born: November 12, 1886 Thornville, Ohio, U.S.
- Died: November 5, 1959 (aged 72) Napa, California, U.S.
- Height: 5 ft 8 in (1.73 m)
- Weight: 141 lb (64 kg)

Sport
- Sport: Long-distance running
- Event: 5000 metres
- College team: Ohio State Buckeyes
- Club: Cleveland Athletic Club; Chicago Athletic Association

Garnett Merrill Wikoff (November 12, 1886 – November 5, 1959) was an American long-distance runner. He attended Ohio State University and competed for the Ohio State Buckeyes track and field program for three years, later being named to the Ohio State All-Century team. He competed in the men's 5000 metres at the 1912 Summer Olympics.

== Early life ==
Garnett Merrill Wikoff was born on November 12, 1886, in Thornville, Ohio. He was the oldest of six children of Catharine and William Wikoff, a public school teacher. He attended North High School in Columbus and while there became friends with future Olympian Carl Cooke.

== Athletic career ==
After graduating from high school, Wikoff began attending Ohio State University (OSU) with Cooke. He ran three years on the Ohio State track team, being declared ineligible for one due to having competed with the professional Cleveland Athletic Club.

Wikoff was described in the MakiO as having been one of "the most remarkable men ever" at Ohio State. He was one of the best two-mile racers in the country, and broke the school's indoor and outdoor records for the event in 1910, and then repeatedly broke his own records the following year. He was the track team captain as a senior, and was given a gold medal by the OSU Athletic Board in 1911. At the Amateur Athletic Union tournament in 1910, he took first place "easily" against 13 of the best runners in the country. Over 90 years following his time at OSU, Wikoff was named to the school's track and field All-Century team in 2002.

To have the money to attend college, Wikoff delivered newspapers. It was this that was credited for his talents in long-distance running, with an article from the Norwalk Evening Herald saying,

He has a route and it is a large one, covering territory of nine or ten miles. This has to be traversed each morning before breakfast and school. It is to this work that Wikoff owes his successes and fame as a long-distance runner, and from this work, he also earns enough to pay for his education. For two years, he has had the route and has carried papers in rain or shine, in heat or cold. Each morning, the young man is up at an hour when most of his schoolmates are asleep. Daily, he began to quicken his pace. First, he adopted a brisk walk, then a dog trot, and now he runs at full speed, stopping only to deliver his papers.

In June 1912, Wikoff went to an event in Evansville, Illinois which would determine a spot on the United States team for the 1912 Summer Olympics. He won the Central Olympic Trial and made the team. Cooke was also selected, and they became the first two Ohio State varsity athletes to make the Olympics. At the Olympics, held in Stockholm, Sweden, Wikoff competed in the men's 5000 metres event, but did not advance in the third heat. He competed against Mauritz Carlsson (Sweden), Ernest Glover (Great Britain), Cyril Porter (Great Britain), Mikhail Nikolsky (Russian Empire), and Aarne Lindholm (Finland), but was "not in good condition," and partway through started "going lame" until by the 3500 metre point could no longer participate.

== Later life ==
After the Olympics, Wikoff graduated from Ohio State and competed for the Chicago Athletic Association. He also officiated track meets and coached track at Ohio State for a time. He served in the United States Army Corps of Engineers during World War I and his brother, Walter, later captained the Ohio State cross country team. Following the war, Wikoff worked at an insurance company in Columbus and married Laura Evans in 1923. The couple moved to California and he died childless in California in November 1959, at the age of 72.
