= Georg Mickler =

German middle-distance runner

Personal information
- Born: 7 September 1892 Charlottenburg, Berlin, Germany
- Died: 14 June 1915 (aged 22) Tarnów, Małopolskie, Poland

Sport
- Sport: Athletics
- Event: middle-distance
- Club: SC Charlottenburg

Alfred Georg Mickler (7 September 1892 – 14 June 1915) was a German track and field athlete who competed in the 1912 Summer Olympics.

== Biography ==
Mickler was selected to represent Germany at the 1912 Olympic Games in Stockholm, Sweden. He was eliminated in the first round of the 1500 metres competition. He was also a member of the German team which was eliminated in the first round of the 3000 metres team race by Sweden.

The following year, he finished third behind John Zander in the 1 mile event at the British 1913 AAA Championships.

Mickler was killed in action during World War I in Poland.

== See also ==
- List of Olympians killed in World War I
