= John Paul Jones (runner) =

American athlete

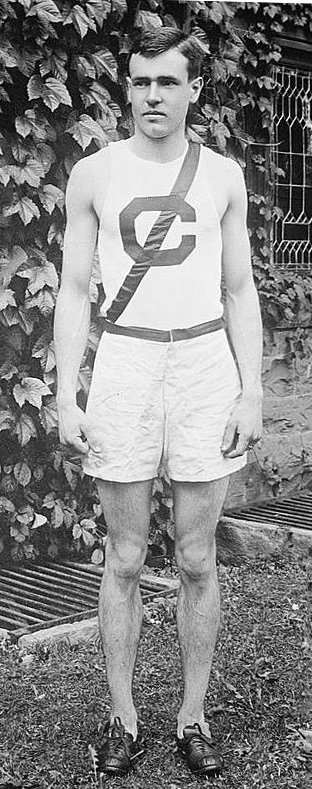
- Jones c. 1911

Personal information
- Born: October 15, 1890 Washington, D.C., United States
- Died: January 5, 1970 (aged 79) Tucson, Arizona, United States
- Education: Cornell University
- Height: 179 cm (5 ft 10 in)
- Weight: 66 kg (146 lb)

Sport
- Sport: Athletics
- Event: 800 m – mile
- Club: Cornell Big Red, Ithaca

Achievements and titles
- Personal best(s): 800 m – 1:53.1y (1912); 1500 m – 3:57.2 (1912); Mile – 4:14.4 (1913)

John Paul Jones (October 15, 1890 – January 5, 1970) was an American track athlete who set several world records in the mile, including the first mile record to be ratified by the International Association of Athletics Federations in 1913.

== Biography ==
Jones entered Cornell University in 1909, majoring in mechanical engineering. He showed little initial promise in track, not making the team until his last year and not impressing until his last race. An extremely popular and handsome man, Jones worked long hours on his studies, played basketball and tennis in the summer and ran as a pastime. As a senior, he was selected for membership in the Quill and Dagger society.

But he worked and trained hard as a runner and had the most successful coach of the era, Jack Moakley. Initially a cross country runner, he easily won the freshman intercollegiate championships and, in the fall of his second year, won the IC4A cross country championship.

On May 27, 1911, Jones ran in the IC4A championships at the Soldiers Field Soccer Stadium in Allston, Massachusetts in front of 12,000 spectators. Entered in the mile, Boyle of Penn State led at the quarter in 59 2/5 followed by his teammate Wilton Paull. Jones hung back in fifth place. Hanavan of Michigan State led at the half-mile mark with a 2:08 1/5, with Paull in second and Jones in third. Paull grabbed the lead at 1,000 yards, but Hanavan regained it for a lap. Then, Jones lengthened his stride and passed Paull and Hanavan, winning by 10 yards. His time: 4:15 2/5, a new amateur world record, finally surpassing Thomas Conneff's 4:15 3/5 set 16 years earlier. However, the time was inferior to the professional record of 4:12 3/4 set by Walter George in 1886.

Jones was not done for the day. He additionally ran and won the 880 yards to give Cornell the IC4A championship.

He spent the summer playing baseball and tennis, won the IC4A cross country championship again in the fall, then tied for first in the mile with a 4:20 3/5 at the 1912 IC4A. He won the 880 in a collegiate record time of 1:53 4/5.

=== 1912 Olympics ===
He had no desire to compete in the Olympics but was talked into it and made the ship shortly before it departed for Stockholm.

The 1912 Olympic 1500 metre competition featured the greatest field of mile/1500 m runners ever assembled to that point. Besides Jones, the 1908 Olympic champion Mel Sheppard was entered, as was the speedy Arnold Jackson of Britain, and the promising miler Norman Taber from Providence, Rhode Island. Additionally, American Abel Kiviat, who held the world record in the 1500 m, was in the field.

Jones was not as prepared as he could have been as he could not train on the ship across the Atlantic, so Kiviat, who had set his 1500 m record of 3:55 4/5 only on 26 May of that year, barely missing Jones' mile record in the process, was favored.

In the end, Jackson prevailed in the final, held July 10, with Kiviat and Taber so close an official camera needed to be consulted to determine who won silver. Jones finished fourth. He also participated in the 800 metres event but was eliminated in the first round. At the same Olympics, he competed in the baseball event, which was held as demonstration sport.

Jones, out of the medals, won his third IC4A cross country championship that fall, then ran an indoor mile in 4:19 4/5 early in 1913 in Ann Arbor, Michigan.

=== Second mile record ===
On 31 May, Jones ran again in the IC4A championships in Cambridge and was up against Olympic 1,500 m silver medalist Taber in the mile.

Taber led in the first three quarters, in 61.6, 2:09.3 and 3:16.1. But Jones launched into his drive as the bell for the final lap sounded, and Taber couldn't respond. He crossed the finish line in 4:14 2/5, a new world amateur record and the first mile record to be recognized by the new governing body of track and field, the IAAF, known then as the International Amateur Athletics Federation.

Jones subsequently lost his next race, the 880 yd, which proved to be his final race. He graduated from college and retired from the sport.

Records
Preceded by N/A	Men's Mile World Record Holder; May 31, 1913 – July 16, 1915	Succeeded by (United States) Norman Taber
