= Georg Amberger =

German middle-distance runner

Georg Wilhelm Amberger (31 July 1890 – 6 February 1949) was a German track and field athlete who competed in the 1912 Summer Olympics.

In 1912, he was eliminated in the first round of the 1500 metres competition. He was also a member of the German team which was eliminated in the first round of the 3000 metres team race by Sweden.
