= Henrik Nordström =

Swedish long-distance runner

Johan Henrik Nordström (April 30, 1891 – February 10, 1982) was a Swedish track and field athlete who competed in the 1912 Summer Olympics. In 1912, he qualified for the final of the 5000 metres event but did not participate in the race. He also started in the individual cross country competition but did not finish the race.
