= Gregor Vietz =

German long-distance runner

Gregor Vietz (26 June 1890 – 10 September 1965) was a German track and field athlete who competed in the 1912 Summer Olympics. He was born in Berlin. In 1912, he finished 27th in the individual cross country event. In the 5000 metres competition as well as of the 10000 metres event he was eliminated in the first round. He was also a member of the German team which was eliminated in the first round of the 3000 metres team race by Sweden.
