= Arthur Treble =

British athlete

Arthur Leonard Treble
Personal information
- Nationality: British
- Born: October 8, 1889 Chichester, England
- Died: September 1, 1966 Newtown, Connecticut, United States

Sport
- Sport: Track and field
- Event: 5000 metres

Achievements and titles
- Olympic finals: 1912 Summer Olympics

Arthur Leonard Treble (8 October 1889 – 1 September 1966) was a British track and field athlete who competed in the 1912 Summer Olympics in Stockholm, Sweden. He was born in Chichester.

In 1912, he was eliminated in the first round of the 5000 metres event.

He died on 1 September 1966, at age 76, in Newtown, Connecticut, United States.
