= Arnold Jackson (British Army officer) =

Athletics competitor, army officer, and lawyer

Brigadier-General Arnold Jackson CBE DSO & Three Bars
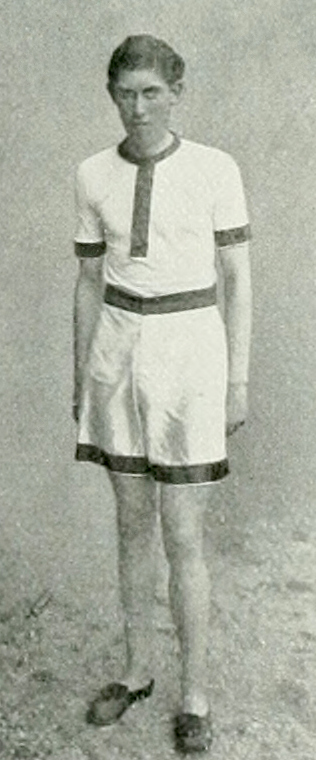
- Born: 5 April 1891; Addlestone, Surrey
- Died: 13 November 1972 (aged 81); Oxford, Oxfordshire
- Military career
- Allegiance: United Kingdom
- Branch: British Army
- Service years: 1914–1919
- Rank: Brigadier-General
- Nickname: "Jackers"
- Service number: 81135
- Units: Loyal Regiment (North Lancashire)
- Commands: 13th (Service) Battalion, King's Royal Rifle Corps (1918)
- Conflicts: First World War
- Awards: Commander of the Order of the British Empire; Companion of the Distinguished Service Order & Three Bars; Mentioned in Despatches (6)

Brigadier-General Arnold Nugent Strode Strode-Jackson, CBE, DSO & Three Bars (5 April 1891 – 13 November 1972) was a British athlete, British Army officer, and a barrister. He was the winner of the 1500 m at the 1912 Summer Olympics, in what was hailed at the time as "the greatest race ever run". He was a brigadier general and amongst the most highly decorated British general officers of the First World War.

== Early life ==
He was born Arnold Nugent Strode Jackson at Addlestone, Surrey, changing his surname to Strode-Jackson on 31 March 1919 (as noted in The London Gazette of 1 April 1919). He was the son of Morton Strode Jackson and Edith Rosine Martin and grandson of Lieutenant General George Jackson.

His uncle was Clement Jackson, athlete, academic, bursar of Hertford College, Oxford, and co-founder of the Amateur Athletic Association. His sister was the novelist Myrtle Beatrice Strode Strode-Jackson.

He was educated at Malvern College, where he was head of his house and head of the athletics team, and there he acquired the nickname "Jackers". Jackson entered Brasenose College, Oxford in 1910, where he took a degree in law.

== Athletic career ==
Arnold Jackson
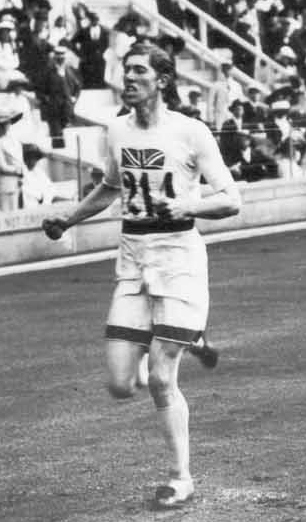
- Jackson winning the 1500 m race at the 1912 Olympics

Personal information
- Height: 176 cm (5 ft 9 in)
- Weight: 67 kg (148 lb)

Sport
- Sport: Athletics
- Events: 1500 m, mile
- Club: University of Oxford AC; Achilles Club

Achievements and titles
- Personal bests: 1500 – 3:56.8 (1912); Mile – 4:21.4 (1912)
Medal record
Representing Great Britain
Olympic Games
Gold medal – first place	1912 Stockholm	1500 metres

Jackson rowed and played football and hockey for Brasenose College, being captain of the hockey team. He won the mile race for Oxford against Cambridge three times. He was President of the Oxford University Athletic Club.

In 1912, while still an undergraduate, Jackson cut short his fishing holiday in Norway and travelled by train to compete in that year's Olympic Games in Sweden. He had to compete as a private entry, not having been chosen by the Great Britain team, along with his friend from Cambridge, Philip Baker, another private entry. This was the last Olympics at which such private entries were allowed. Even when compared to the amateurish race preparation of the era, Jackson's training regime of massage, golf and walking seemed very relaxed.

At Stockholm, American hopes were high to win a gold in 1500 m, as the USA was successful in mile racing at that time, and seven of the runners in the final were from the USA. The race started at a modest 65 second pace, until Norman Taber took the lead and increased the pace. At the bell for the final lap, Abel Kiviat, a world record holder in 1500 m, was first, followed by Taber and John Paul Jones, the mile world record holder. On the final turn, Mel Sheppard and Jackson also joined the crowd on his heels, with Sweden's Ernst Wide closing fast. The three Americans ran abreast, so Jackson had to run wide. With 50 yards left, Jackson came even with Kiviat and Taber as Jones and Wide started to fade. Jackson summoned one last burst and captured the gold in 3:56.8, an Olympic record. Kiviat and Taber both clocked 3:56.9, and the photo had to be reviewed before officials handed the silver to Kiviat. Baker finished sixth. At the time, it was widely acclaimed as being "the greatest race ever run". Aged 21, Jackson was the youngest ever Olympic 1500 m gold medalist until Asbel Kiprop in 2008, aged 19.

== Military career ==
At the outbreak of the First World War in August 1914, Jackson was commissioned in the Loyal North Lancashire Regiment and, in September 1914, was attached to the 13th (Service) Battalion, Rifle Brigade as a Second lieutenant. In December 1914, he was promoted to temporary Lieutenant. He went over to France with the battalion and was promoted to Captain on 1 July 1916. He was made an acting Major by the time of his appointment as Companion of the Distinguished Service Order (DSO) on 4 June 1917. On 30 August 1917 he was transferred as acting Lieutenant-Colonel to take command of 13th (Service) Battalion, King's Royal Rifle Corps, whose CO had just been killed. He commanded the battalion during the latter stages of the Battle of Passchendaele and the German spring offensive and was made a full lieutenant colonel in May 1918. He was wounded in the right arm during the battalion's attack on Achiet-le-Grand and Bihucourt on 23 August and left the battalion. He was promoted to acting Brigadier-General in October 1918.

The war put an end to his sporting career, for he was wounded three times and left permanently lame.

=== Medals and honours ===
He was awarded his DSO and three Bars, with citations from The London Gazette, as follows:

- Appointed as DSO on 4 June 1917, general citation.
- 1st Bar awarded on 18 July 1917, "for conspicuous gallantry during lengthy operations, when he assumed command of the battalion and, although wounded on two separate occasions, was able to carry out most valuable work. By his skill and courage he offered a splendid example to all ranks with him."
- 2nd Bar awarded on 13 May 1918, "for conspicuous gallantry and devotion to duty. His battalion was subjected to an intense bombardment throughout a whole day, which caused many casualties and cut off all communication by wire with the front-line companies. He handles the situation with such skill and initiative that when the enemy attacked towards evening the casualties caused by the bombardment had been evacuated and replaced by reinforcements and communication with the front line had been re-established. It was entirely due to his powers of command and the splendid spirit with which he inspired his men that the attack on the greater part of his front was repulsed, and that the enemy, though they penetrated into parts of the front line, were counter-attacked and held at bay until the arrival of reinforcements. By his skilful dispositions he materially assisted the counter-attack which finally drove the enemy back with heavy losses and completely re-established the position."
- 3rd Bar awarded on 2 December 1918, "for conspicuous gallantry and brilliant leadership. During an attack by our troops Lt-Col Jackson advanced with the leading wave of his battalion, and was among the first to reach the railway embankment. The machine-gun fire against them was intense, but the gallant leading of this officer gave such impetus to the assault that the enemy¹s main line of resistance was broken. He was subsequently wounded during the work of consolidation."

Jackson was also Mentioned in Despatches six times during the war, all published in the Gazette: 15 June 1916, 23 July 1917, 21 December 1917, 24 May 1918, 28 December 1918 and 12 January 1920.

== Later life ==
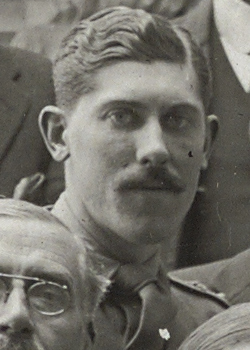
Arnold Jackson in May 1919

He was a member of the British delegation at the Paris Peace Conference, 1919 and was appointed a Commander of the Order of the British Empire for his work there. He was called to the Bar at Middle Temple.

He went on to be a member of the British Olympic Council in 1920 and a major force in the founding of the Achilles Club.

He emigrated to the United States in 1921, where he worked in industry and as a Justice of the Peace in Connecticut. He directed the first Kentucky Derby Festival in 1935. During the Second World War, he was a colonel on the staff of the Governor of Kentucky and Administration Officer of the Inspection Board of U.K. and Canada in New York and Ottawa, in charge of Inspectors and anti-sabotage precautions. He also met convoys arriving in New York and gave what help he could to returning servicemen.

He was the author of Kentucky Heyday: 1787–1827; the life and times of Kentucky's foremost portrait painter, published in 1956, a book about the artist Matthew Jouett

He became a U.S. citizen in 1945.

After his wife Dora's death in 1963, he returned to Oxford, where he lived until his death on 13 November 1972.

== Personal life ==
In 1918, he married Dora Mooney, daughter of the late William Allen Mooney of Silver Hills, New Albany, Indiana, USA.

== Legacy ==
Mike Hodd and Jack Thorington wrote a play about his life, "Strode-Jackson," which premiered at the King's Head Theatre in London in 1979.

A full-length oil painting of Jackson is prominently displayed at Vincent's Club in Oxford, having been rescued and repaired after lying neglected for many years in a Brasenose College cellar.
