= George Hutson =

British long-distance runner

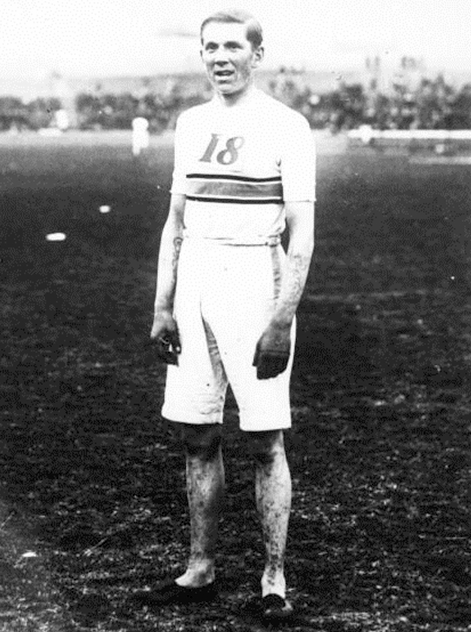

Personal information
- Born: 22 December 1889 Lewes, East Sussex, England
- Died: 14 September 1914 (aged 24) Venizel, Aisne, France

Sport
- Sport: Athletics
- Event: middle-distance
- Club: Surrey AC
Medal record
Men's athletics
Representing Great Britain
Olympic Games
Bronze medal – third place	1912 Stockholm	5000 metres
Bronze medal – third place	1912 Stockholm	3000 m team race

George William Hutson (22 December 1889 – 14 September 1914) was a British athlete who competed at the 1912 Summer Olympics.

== Biography ==
Hutson, born in Lewes, East Sussex, became the National 4 miles champion after winning the AAA Championships title at the 1912 AAA Championships.

Shortly after the 1912 AAAs he competed for Great Britain in the 5,000 metres event at the 1912 Summer Olympics held in Stockholm, Sweden. He won the bronze medal and also joined teammates Joe Cottrill and Cyril Porter to win his second bronze of the games in the 3000 metre team race.

Hutson went on to win the British AAA 4 miles championship again in both 1913 and 1914.

Hutson was killed in action, aged 24, during World War I, serving as a serjeant with the Royal Sussex Regiment during the Battle of the Marne. His remains were not recovered, and his name is recorded on the La Ferte-sous-Jouarre Memorial.

== See also ==
- List of Olympians killed in World War I
