= Joe Cottrill =

British middle-distance runner

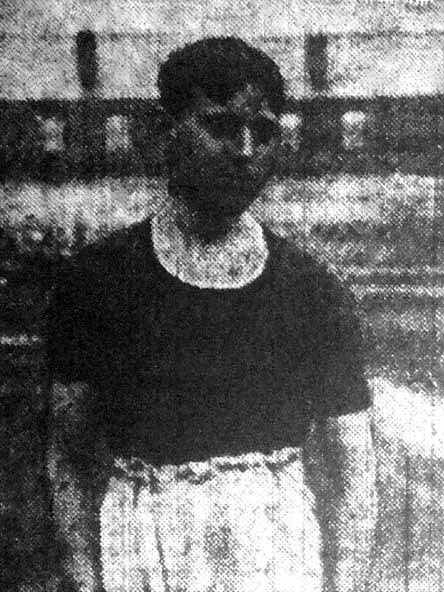
- Cottrill of Hallamshire Harriers and Athletic Club in 1912

Personal information
- Born: 14 October 1888 Woodhouse, South Yorkshire, England
- Died: 26 October 1972 (aged 84) Sheffield, England

Sport
- Sport: Athletics
- Event: middle-distance
- Club: Hallamshire Harriers
Medal record
Olympic Games
Representing Great Britain
Men's athletics
| Bronze medal – third place | 1912 Stockholm | 3000 m team race |

William Cottrill (14 October 1888 – 26 October 1972) was a British athlete who competed at the 1912 Summer Olympics.

== Career ==
Cottrill finished third behind Eddie Owen in the 1 mile event at the 1912 AAA Championships.

Shortly after the AAA Championships, he competed for Great Britain in the 1912 Summer Olympics held in Stockholm, Sweden, in the 1,500 metres, in which he did not qualify for the final, and in the 3,000 metres team race, where he won a bronze medal with his teammates George Hutson and Cyril Porter. The photographs below of the 3,000 metres team race show Cottrill in the middle of the pack, partially obscured by athlete No.62, and finishing in sixth place on the extreme right of the picture. He was also a member of Hallamshire Harriers and Athletic Club.

== Gallery ==
Media related to Joe Cottrill at Wikimedia Commons

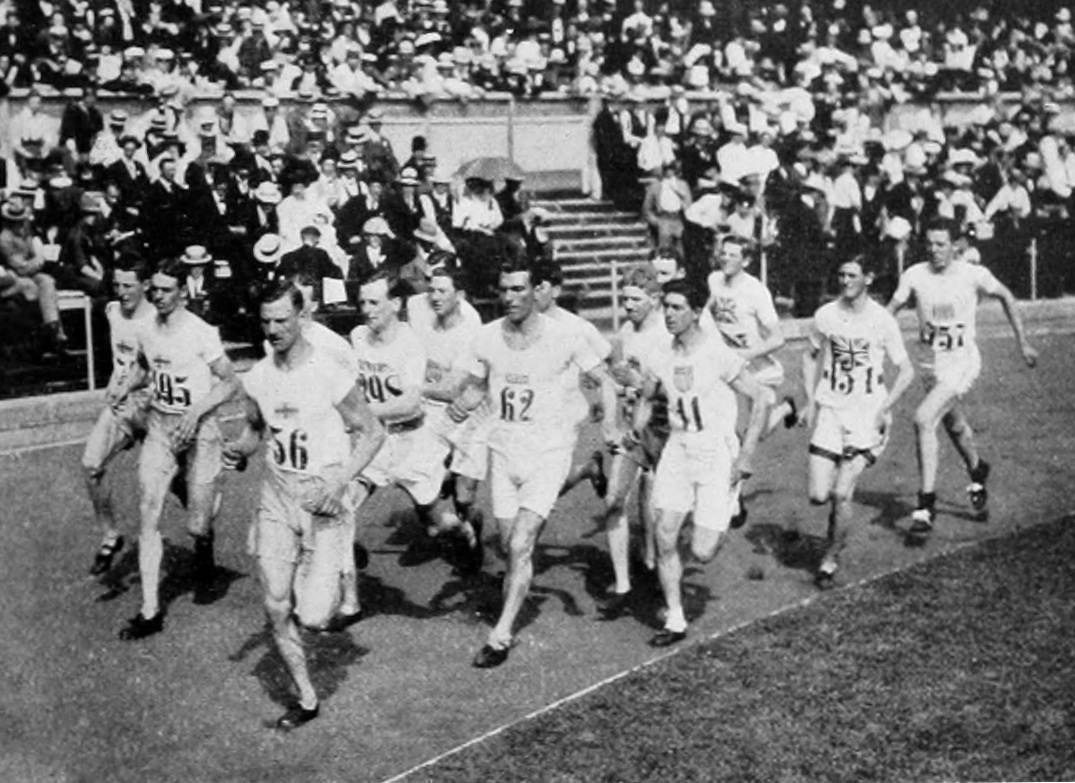
1912 Athletics men's 3000 metre team race final2

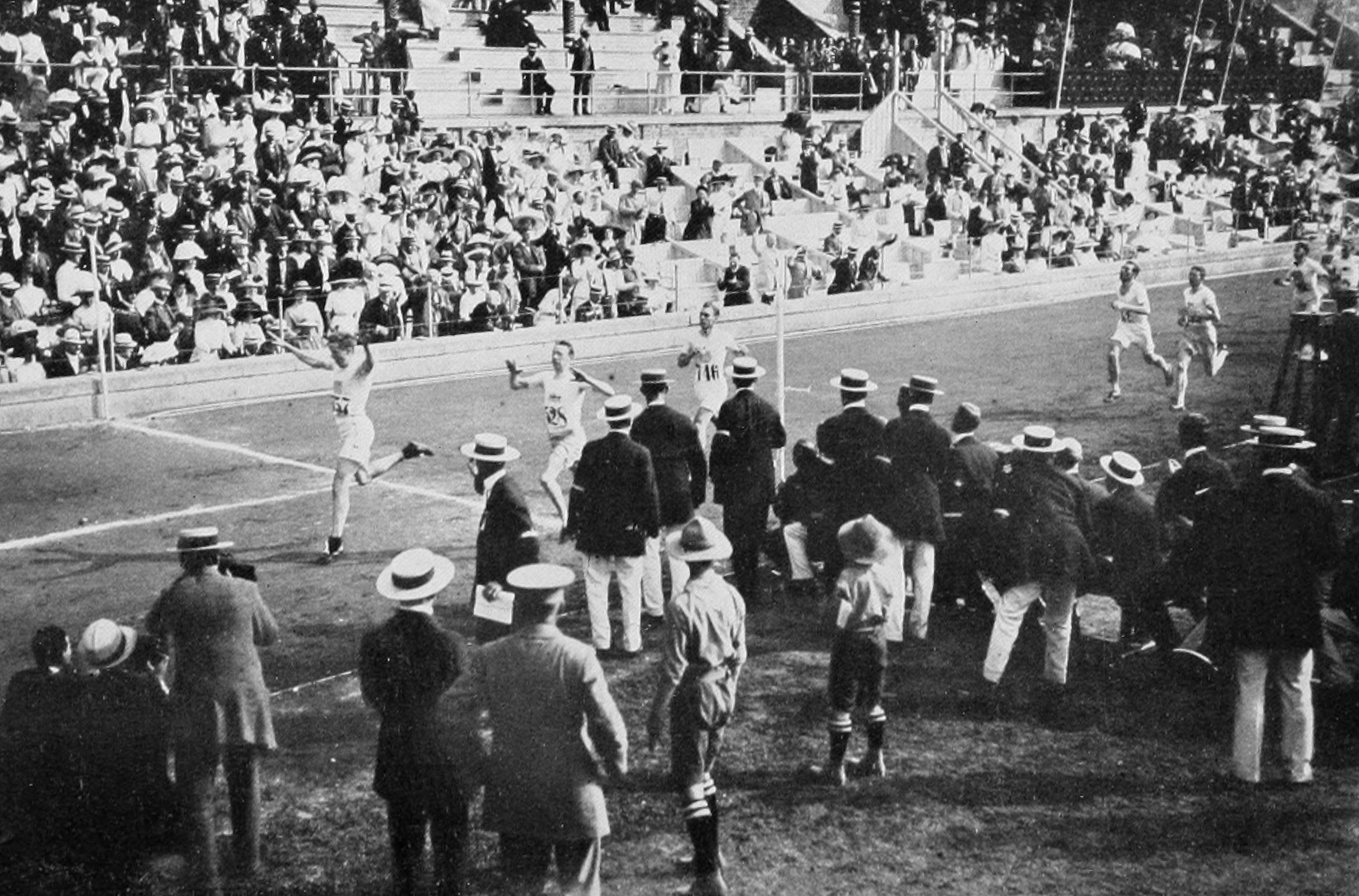
1912 Athletics men's 3000 metre team race final3

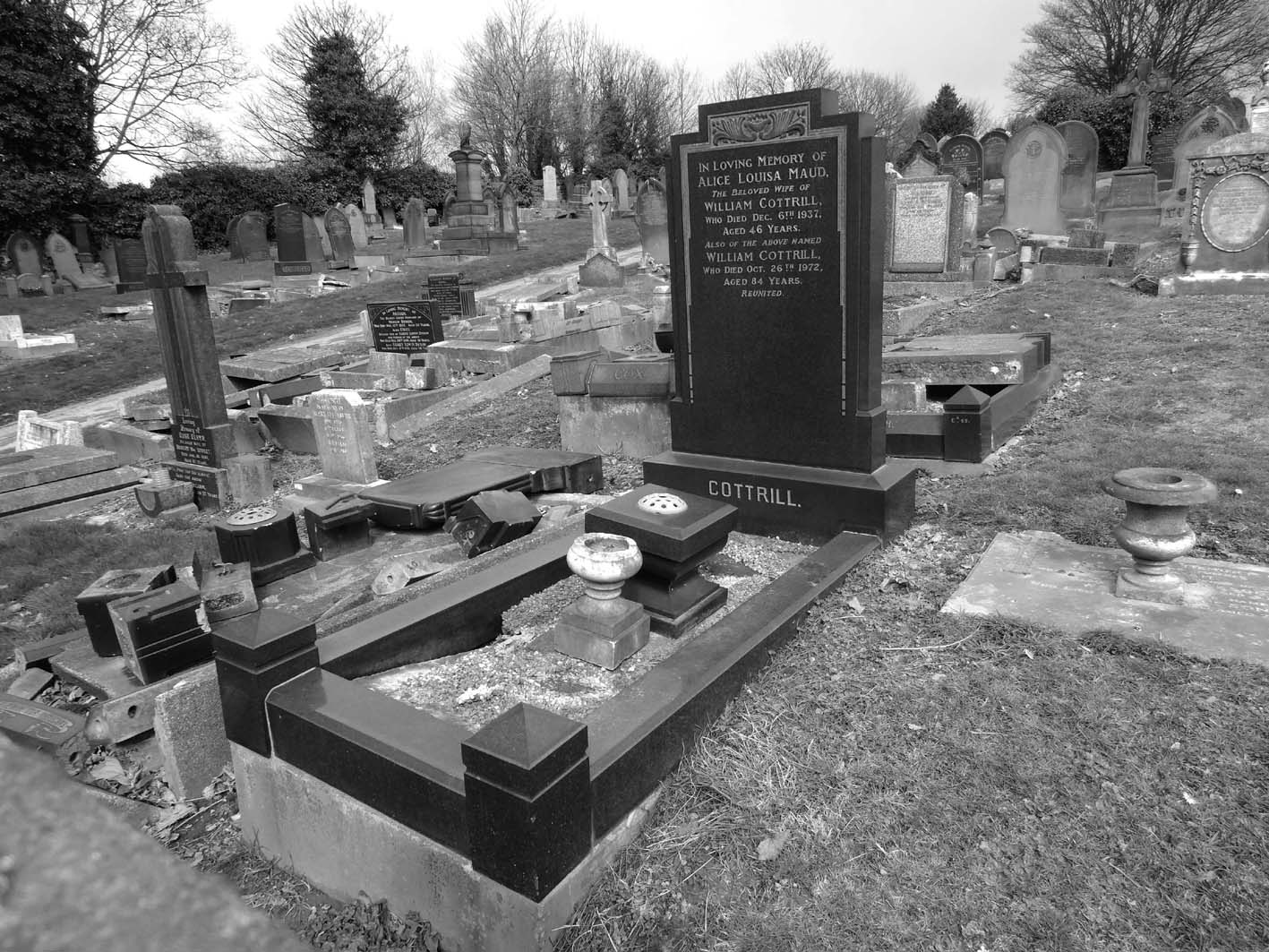
The grave of William Cottrill at Tinsley Park Cemetery, Sheffield
