= Bror Modigh =

Swedish long-distance runner

Bror Oscar Anders Modigh (10 February 1891 – 22 February 1956) was a Swedish track and field athlete who competed in the 1912 Summer Olympics. In 1912, he was eliminated in the first round of the 5000 metres competition.
