= Joe Keeper =

Canadian long-distance runner

Personal information
- Born: January 17, 1886 Walker Lake, Manitoba
- Died: September 29, 1971 (aged 85)
- Education: Brandon Indian Residential School
- Spouse: Christina McLeod

Sport
- Country: Canada
- Sport: Athletics

Achievements and titles
- Olympic finals: 1912 - fourth in the 10,000 and ninth in the 5,000
- Personal bests: 15:28.9 for the 5000 and 32:36.2 for the 10,000

Joseph Benjamin Keeper (January 17, 1886 – September 29, 1971) was a Canadian long-distance runner, and a member of the 1912 Canadian Olympic team.

== Early and personal life ==
Joseph Benjamin Keeper, a member of the Norway House Cree Nation, was born at Walker Lake, Manitoba. He was sent to Brandon for schooling at the Brandon Indian Residential School, and it was while there that he showed an enthusiasm for long-distance running. During his upbringing, he was raised to practice the Methodist religion.

In 1916, Keeper joined the Army and served for two years in France. He received The Military Medal for his actions at Cambrai during WWI. In 1917, Keeper joined with Tom Longboat to win an inter-Allied cross country championship near Vimy Ridge. Longboat, Keeper, and other First Nation long-distance runners A. Jamieson and John Nackaway served as dispatch carriers for the 107th Pioneer Battalion. In addition to the Military Medal, Keeper received the British War Medal and the Victory Medal.

Following the war, he returned to Winnipeg, where he worked as a carpenter, before moving back to the northern part of the province, where he worked for the Hudson's Bay Company until he retired in 1951. He and his wife, Christina McLeod had four sons and three daughters. He is the grandfather of actress and Canadian politician Tina Keeper.

== Career ==
In 1910, Keeper moved to Winnipeg, where he joined the North End Amateur Athletic Club. The following year, he set a Canadian record for the ten-mile run.

In 1912, he was selected to the Canadian Olympic team and participated at the 1912 Summer Olympics at Stockholm, Sweden. He raced in the 5000 metre run and in the 10,000 metre run, where he finished fourth in the 10,000 and ninth in the 5,000, the best result ever for a Canadian runner in those events. His 5000-meter and 10,000 meter personal bests also came from the 1912 Stockholm games where he ran a time of 15:28.9 for the 5000 and 32:36.2 for the 10,000 meter run.

Keeper was inducted into the Canadian Olympic Hall of Fame and Canada's Sports Hall of Fame in 2015 and also the Manitoba Sports Hall of Fame and Museum in 1984.

== Legacy ==
The Joe Keeper Memorial Run (now the Joe Keeper - Angela Chalmers celebration run) is held each spring by the Manitoba Runners’ Association. The Norway House Cree Nation holds memorial races in Keeper's name.
