= Mauritz Carlsson =

Swedish long-distance runner

Gustaf Mauritz "Sörle" Carlsson (January 5, 1890 – February 11, 1953) was a Swedish track and field athlete who competed in the 1912 Summer Olympics.

In 1912 he finished seventh in the 5000 metres event. He also started in the 10000 metres competition but did not finish the final.
