= Kristian Hellström =

Swedish middle-distance runner

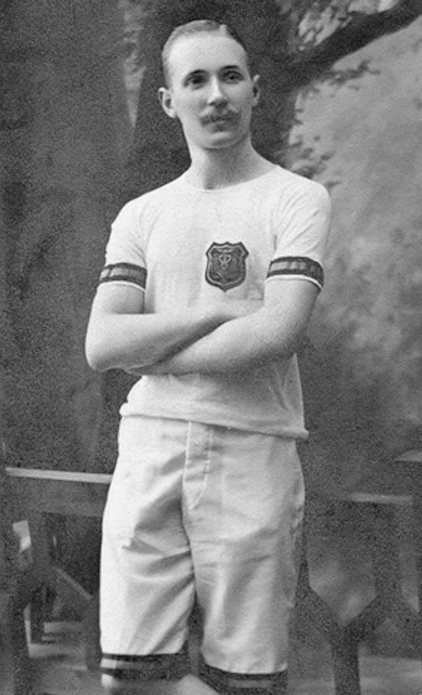

Personal information
- Born: 24 July 1880 Stockholm, Sweden
- Died: 14 June 1946 (aged 65) Stockholm, Sweden
- Height: 1.80 m (5 ft 11 in)
- Weight: 77 kg (170 lb)

Sport
- Sport: Athletics
- Event: 400–10000 m
- Club: IF Sleipner, Stockholm; L.A.C. BFC Preußen Berlin; Teutonia 1899 Berlin

Achievements and titles
- Personal best(s): 400 m – 50.7 (1907); 800 m – 1:59.1y (1907); 1500 m – 4:12.6 (1902); Mile – 4:30.8 (1907); 5000 m – 16:14.4 (1903); 10000 m – 34:24.0 (1904)
Medal record
Men's athletics
Representing Sweden
Intercalated Games
Bronze medal – third place	1906 Athens	1500 metres

Kristian Hellström (24 July 1880 – 14 June 1946) was a Swedish middle-distance runner and a sports administrator. He competed at the 1906 Intercalated Games in the 800 m and 1500 m events and finished in fifth and third place, respectively. At the 1908 Summer Olympics, he failed to reach the final of the 800 m event.

Nationally, he won the 1500 m title in 1900 and 1901 and the 10,000 m title in 1902. He was also the German champion for the 1500 m in 1905.

Hellström was a prolific sports administrator who founded his first sports club, IF Sleipner Stockholm, in 1897 at age 17. In 1901, he launched the first cross-country race in Sweden. In 1912, Hellström became Secretary-General of the Organizing Committee of the Stockholm Olympics. He was also a founding member of the International Association of Athletics Federations (IAAF), becoming its first Secretary-General from 1913 to 1914.

Hellström finished second behind Ivo Fairbairn-Crawford in the 880 yards event at the British 1907 AAA Championships.
