= Tell Berna =

American athlete

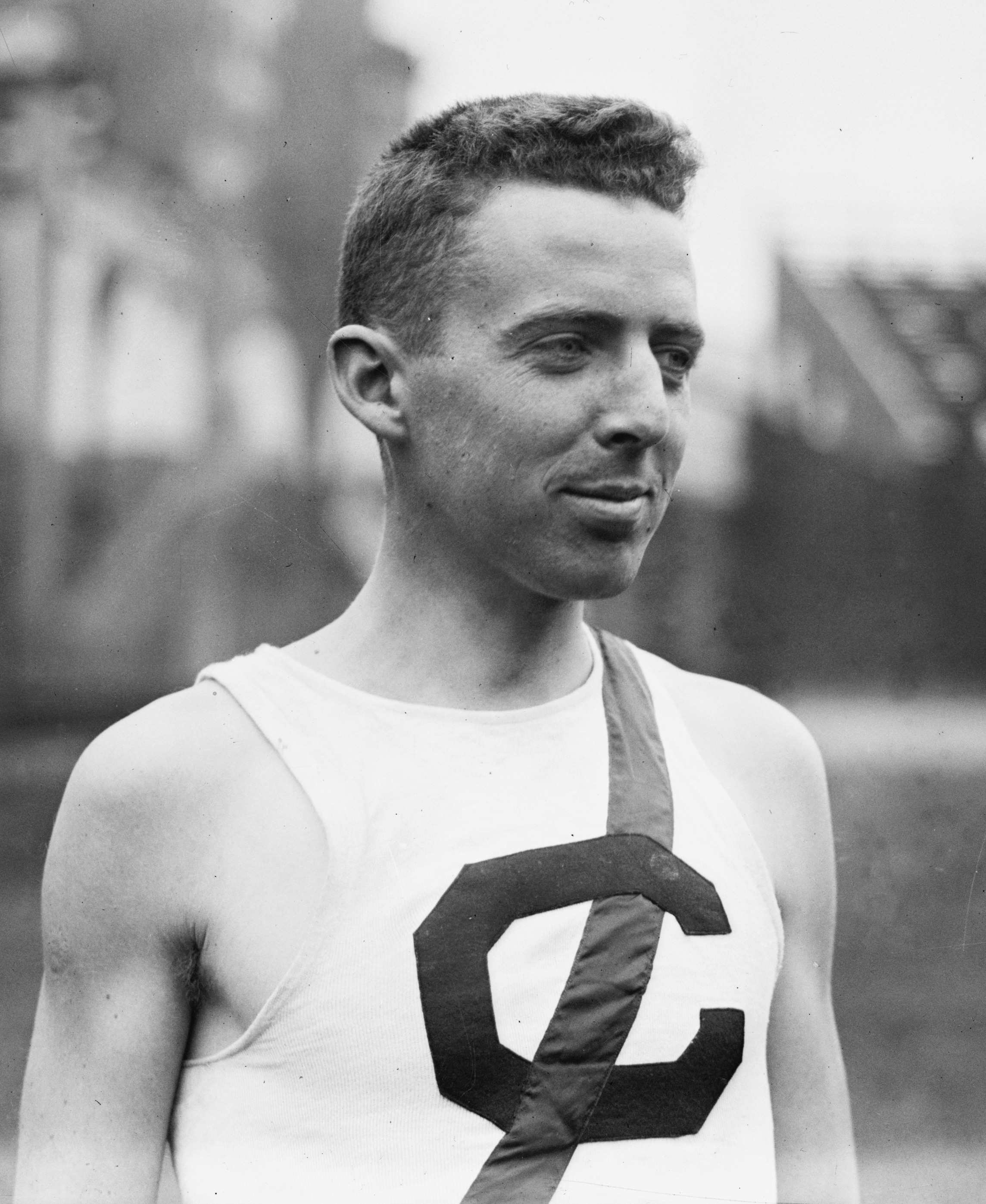

Personal information
- Born: July 24, 1891 Pelham Manor, New York, United States
- Died: April 5, 1975 (aged 83) Nantucket, Massachusetts, United States
- Height: 1.88 m (6 ft 2 in)
- Weight: 70 kg (154 lb)

Sport
- Sport: Running
- Club: Cornell Big Red, Ithaca
Medal record
Representing the United States
Olympic Games
Gold medal – first place	1912 Stockholm	3000 m team

Tell Schirnding Berna (July 24, 1891 – April 5, 1975) was an American middle-distance and long-distance runner.

His 1912 American record at two miles stood for twenty years. He competed for the United States in the 1912 Summer Olympics held in Stockholm, Sweden in the 3000 metre team, where he won the gold medal with his teammates Norman Taber and George Bonhag. He also finished fifth in the individual 5000 meters.

Berna graduated from Cornell University in 1912 and was a member of the Sphinx Head Society. After college, Berna had a career in the machine tool industry; in 1937, he became general secretary of the National Machine Tools Business Association and served in that post through World War II. He was serving as general manager of the organization in 1950 when he contributed an article to American Affairs.
