= Louis Scott (runner, born 1889) =

American long-distance runner

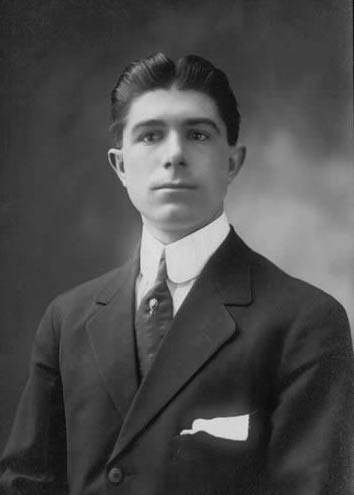

Personal information
- Born: November 16, 1889 Paterson, New Jersey, United States
- Died: June 1960 (aged 70)
- Height: 1.72 m (5 ft 8 in)
- Weight: 64 kg (141 lb)

Sport
- Sport: Athletics
- Events: 5000 m, 10000 m
- Club: South Paterson AC, Paterson

Achievements and titles
- Personal bests: 5000 – 15:06.4 (1912); 10000 m – 34:14.2 (1912)
Medal record
Representing the United States
Olympic Games
Gold medal – first place	1912 Stockholm	3000 m team race

Henry Louis Scott (November 16, 1889 – June 1960) was an American long-distance runner who competed in the 1912 Summer Olympics. He was part of the American team which won the gold medal in the 3000 m team event. He also competed in the final of the 5000 m, but his place is unknown. In the 10000 m competition he did not finish the final, due to a strong heat. At the same Olympics he finished 24th in the individual cross country race.
