= Nils Frykberg =

Swedish middle-distance runner

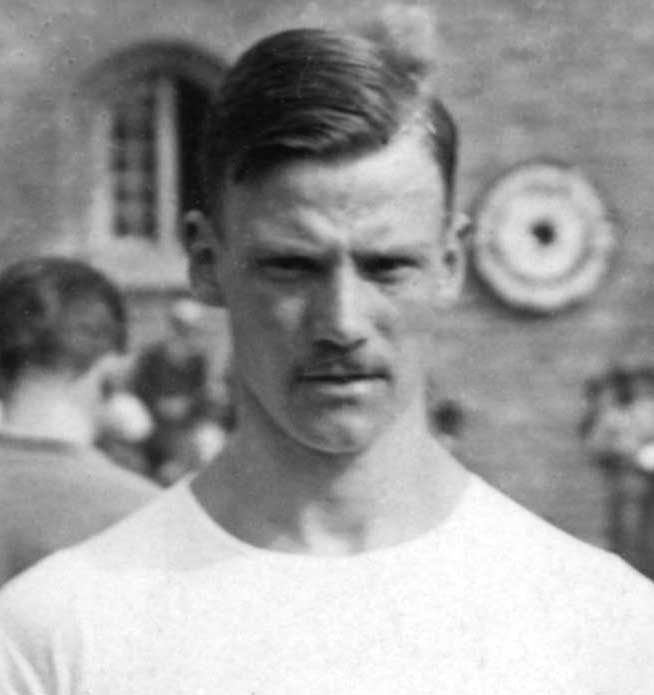

Personal information
- Born: 13 March 1888 Uppsala, Sweden
- Died: 13 December 1966 (aged 78) Gävle, Sweden

Sport
- Sport: Athletics
- Event: 800–5000 m
- Club: IFK Gävle

Achievements and titles
- Personal bests: 800 m – 2:01.8 (1917); 1500 m – 4:05.3 (1913); Mile – 4:25.1 (1913); 5000 m – 15:26.3 (1917)
Medal record
Representing Sweden
Olympic Games
Silver medal – second place	1912 Stockholm	3000 m team race

Nils Frykberg (13 March 1888 – 13 December 1966) was a Swedish runner who competed in the 1912 Summer Olympics. He was part of the Swedish 3000 m race team that won a silver medal. Individually, he was eliminated in the first round of the 1500 metre competition.
