= Norman Taber =

American middle-distance runner

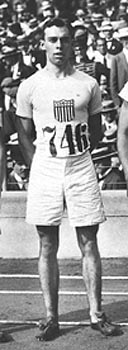
- Norman Taber at the 1912 Olympics

Personal information
- Born: September 3, 1891 Providence, Rhode Island, United States
- Died: July 15, 1952 (aged 60) Orange, New Jersey, United States
- Height: 1.74 m (5 ft 9 in)
- Weight: 52 kg (115 lb)

Sport
- Sport: Middle-distance running
- Club: University of Oxford AC; Achilles Club
Medal record
Representing the United States
Olympic Games
Gold medal – first place	1912 Stockholm	3000 m team race
Bronze medal – third place	1912 Stockholm	1500 m

Norman Stephen Taber (September 3, 1891 – July 15, 1952) was an American middle distance runner. He was the first amateur runner to surpass Walter George's professional record in the mile, set nearly 30 years previously. He also won a bronze medal over 1500 m and a gold medal in the team 3000 m at the Olympic Games in Stockholm 1912.

== 1912 Olympics ==
Taber emerged as a top runner in 1910 when he finished third in the IC4A championship mile for Brown University. Missing the 1911 season, he re-emerged in 1912, finishing sixth in the IC4A cross country, then surprising many by tying mile record holder John Paul Jones over that distance at the IC4A championships.

He was selected for the Olympic 1500 m team and was one of the favorites for that event at the 1912 Olympics held at Stockholm. When the final was held July 10, he led for part of the race and challenged leader Abel Kiviat on the final homestretch. However, Arnold Jackson of Britain passed them both, and a photo-finish between Kiviat and Taber awarded Kiviat the silver medal and Taber the bronze.

He nevertheless won an Olympic gold medal in the 3000 m team race.

== The first IAAF mile record ==
On May 31, 1913, Taber ran again in the IC4A championships, and was up against world record-holder Jones in the mile. Taber led at the first three quarters, in 61.6, 2:09.3 and 3:16.1. But Jones launched into his drive as the bell for the final lap sounded and Taber couldn't respond. He crossed the finish line in 4:14 2/5, a new world amateur record, and the first mile record to be recognized by the new governing body of track and field, the IAAF, known then as the International Amateur Athletics Federation. Taber's 4:16 2/5 made him the fourth-best amateur over the distance.

Taber won the AAU championship over the mile later that year with a 4:26 2/5 clocking, then went to St John's College, Oxford, as a Rhodes Scholar. He ran for Oxford, but did not find much success.

== Taber eclipses George ==
In 1915, he decided to make an attempt to break Jones' mile record, and he trained with coach Eddie O'Connor for six months to do so. By June, he was in top form. He defeated Kiviat on June 26 in 4:15 1/5 in the Eastern Trials for the AAU, then won a mile at the Milrose AA in 4:17 3/5 a few weeks later.

He chose July 16 to make a special attempt to break the mile record. But he was not just aiming for Jones' world record – he was also aiming for Walter George's professional record of 4:12 3/4, set in 1886.

The Harvard track at Allston, Massachusetts was extremely fast and the weather was perfect for the attempt. Five seasoned timers were on hand, as were three pace-setters who were given handicaps to best assist Taber in his quest.

J.W. Ryan, who was given a 10-yard lead, set a fast pace, clocking 58 s for the first lap. Then, D.S. Mahoney, who had been given a 120-yard lead, took up the pace-setting duties and pulled Taber through the half in 2:05, then 3:13 at the three-quarter mark.

J.M. Burke, given a lead of 355 yards, carried Taber on through the final lap, and the crowd, sensing a record, cheered loudly: Taber passed 1500 m unofficially in 3:55, faster than the world record, and it was clear Jones' amateur record would fall. Taber passed Burke into the homestretch and slowed, but kept his form and crossed the finish line.

After a few moments, the official time was announced as 4:12 3/5, and pandemonium ensued, with the crowd invading the track. Taber had beaten George's 29-year-old professional record by 3/20 of a second, and had become the fastest miler in history.

While some raised objections over the pacing involved and the lack of any race, the IAAF ratified the record, and it stood until Paavo Nurmi eclipsed it in 1923.

== Personal life ==
After retiring from competitions Taber became an expert in municipal finances and founded a company in this field. He later became a Life Trustee of Brown University.

Records
Preceded by (United States) John Paul Jones	Men's Mile World Record Holder; July 16, 1915 – August 23, 1923	Succeeded by (Finland) Paavo Nurmi
