= William Moore (athlete) =

Track and field athlete from Great Britain

Personal information
- Nationality: British (English)
- Born: 5 April 1890 Fulham, England
- Died: 12 May 1956 (aged 66) Worthing, England

Sport
- Sport: Athletics
- Event: middle-distance
- Club: University of Oxford AC; Achilles Club
Medal record
Men's athletics
Representing United Kingdom
Bronze medal – third place	1912 Stockholm	3000 m team race

William Craig Moore (5 April 1890 – 12 May 1956) was a British track and field athlete who competed in the 1912 Summer Olympics.

== Biography ==
Moore was educated at Felsted School and Exeter College, Oxford.

In 1911, Moore was elected honorary secretary of OUAC and in 1912 was president.

In 1912, he was eliminated in the first round of the 1500 metres competition. He also helped Great Britain to qualify for the final in the 3000 metre team race. In the final, however, he was the team's weakest link. Nevertheless, he was awarded with a bronze medal.

By trade, Moore was a civil servant.
