= Åke Jansson =

Swedish long-distance runner

Personal information
- Full name: Åke Gilbert Jansson
- Nationality: Swedish
- Born: 3 March 1916 Stockholm, Sweden
- Died: 14 September 1998 (aged 82) Vallingby, Sweden

Sport
- Sport: Long-distance running
- Event: 5000 metres

Åke Gilbert Jansson (also known as Åke Spångert; 3 March 1916 – 14 September 1998) was a Swedish long-distance runner. He competed in the men's 5000 metres at the 1936 Summer Olympics.
