= Aarne Lindholm =

Finnish long-distance runner

Personal information
- Nationality: Finnish
- Born: 12 February 1889
- Died: 19 July 1972 (aged 83)

Sport
- Sport: Long-distance running
- Event: 5000 metres

Aarne Lindholm (12 February 1889 – 19 July 1972) was a Finnish long-distance runner. He competed in the men's 5000 metres at the 1912 Summer Olympics.
