= Eddie Owen (runner) =

British long-distance runner

Personal information
- Born: 6 November 1886 Manchester, England
- Died: 24 September 1949 (aged 62) Woolwich, England

Sport
- Country: Great Britain
- Sport: Long-distance running
Medal record
Men's athletics
Representing Great Britain
Olympic Games
Silver medal – second place	1908 London	5 miles
Bronze medal – third place	1912 Stockholm	3000 m team race

Edward Owen (6 November 1886 – 24 September 1949) was a British athlete who competed mainly in long-distance races.

== Biography ==
Owen competed for Great Britain in the 1908 Summer Olympics, held in London, in the 5 miles race, where he won the silver medal. In the 1912 Summer Olympics he was able to win the bronze medal in the 3000 m team event.

Born in Manchester, he ran for Salford Harriers and Manchester Athletic Club during his career. He twice won at the AAA Championships at the 1909 AAA Championships and 1912 AAA Championships.

He served with the Irish Guards regiment during World War I. After working at Belle Vue Stadium, he went on to manage Crayford & Bexleyheath Stadium (another greyhound track) in Bexley. He died in Woolwich.

== Sources ==
- Profile at Sports-Reference.com
- Edward Owen at World Athletics
- Edward Owen at Olympics.com
- Edward Owen at Olympedia
- Edward Owen at InterSportStats
