= Cyril Porter =

British athlete

Personal information
- Nationality: British (English)
- Born: 12 January 1890 Bridstow, England
- Died: 16 January 1964 (aged 74) Callow, England

Sport
- Sport: Athletics
- Event: long-distance
- Club: University of Oxford AC; Achilles Club
Medal record
Men's athletics
Representing Great Britain
Olympic Games
Bronze medal – third place	1912 Stockholm	3000 m team race

Cyril Henry Atwell Porter (12 January 1890 – 16 January 1964) was a British track and field athlete who competed mainly long-distance running, who competed at the 1912 Summer Olympics.

== Biography ==
Porter was born in Bridstow, Herefordshire and studied at Brasenose College, Oxford.

He competed for Great Britain at the 1912 Olympic Games held in Stockholm, Sweden, in the 3000 metre team, where he won the bronze medal with his teammates Joe Cottrill and George Hutson.
