= Ernst Wide =

Swedish runner

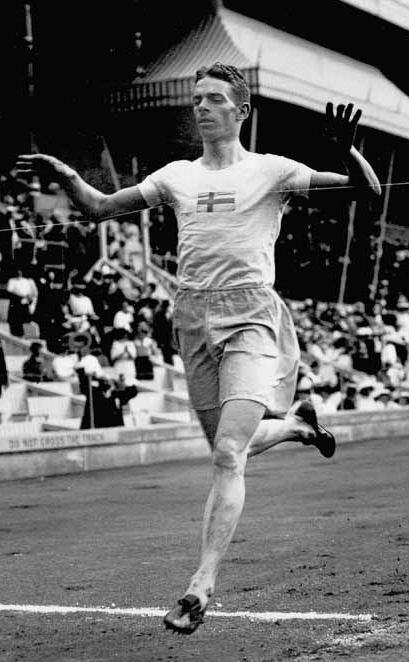
- Wide at the 1912 Olympics

Personal information
- Born: 9 November 1888 Stockholm, Sweden
- Died: 8 April 1950 (aged 61) Stockholm, Sweden
- Height: 1.74 m (5 ft 9 in)
- Weight: 64 kg (141 lb)

Sport
- Sport: Athletics
- Event: 400–5000 m
- Club: IK Göta

Achievements and titles
- Personal best(s): 400 m – 50.0 (1913); 800 m – 1:55.7 (1910); 1500 m – 3:57.6 (1912); 3000 m – 8:46.2 (1912); 5000 m – 15:48.0 (1909)
Medal record
Representing Sweden
Olympic Games
| Silver medal – second place | 1912 Stockholm | 3000 m team race |

Ernst Theodor Wide (9 November 1888 – 8 April 1950) was a Swedish runner. He competed at the 1912 Summer Olympics held in Stockholm in the 1500 m and 3000 m events, and finished in fifth and fourth place, respectively. His fourth finish earned him a silver medal with the Swedish team.
