= Abel Kiviat =

American middle-distance runner

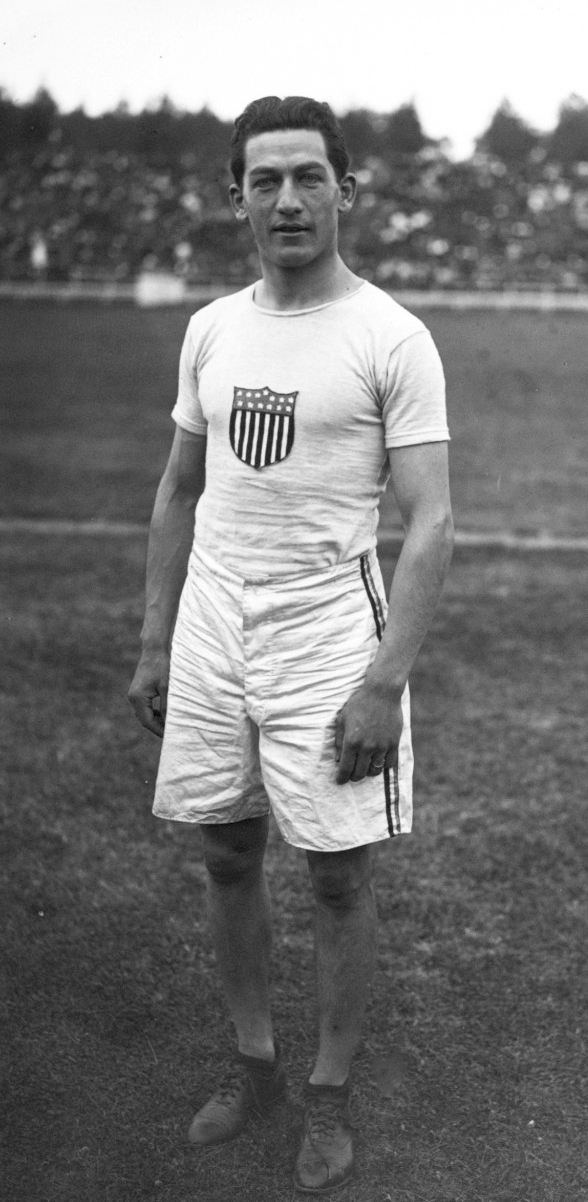
- Kiviat in 1912

Personal information
- Full name: Abel Richard Kiviat
- Born: June 23, 1892 Manhattan, New York City, U.S.
- Died: August 24, 1991 (aged 99) Lakehurst, New Jersey, U.S.
- Height: 5 ft 5 in (165 cm)
- Weight: 110 lb (50 kg)
- Spouse: Isabelle

Sport
- Sport: Middle distance track
- Events: 800 m, 1500 m, 5000 m
- Club: I-AAC, Queens

Achievements and titles
- Personal bests: 800 m – 1:54.1 (1910); 1500 m – 3:55.8 (1912); 5000 m – 15:06.4 (1912)
Medal record
Representing the United States
Olympic Games
| Gold medal – first place | 1912 Stockholm | 3000 m team race |
| Silver medal – second place | 1912 Stockholm | 1500 m |

Abel Richard Kiviat (June 23, 1892 – August 24, 1991) was an American track coach, press agent, and highly accomplished middle-distance runner. He won a gold medal in the 3000m team race and a silver medal in the 1500m at the 1912 Stockholm Olympics. He was the oldest living American Olympic medalist at the time of his death. He competed for and coached the Irish American Athletic Club, and was later a member of the New York Athletic Club.

== Early life ==
Kiviat was the oldest of seven children of Polish immigrants Zelda and Morris Kiviat in New York's Lower East Side. When he was six years old, the family moved to Staten Island and he attended Curtis High School.

== Running career ==
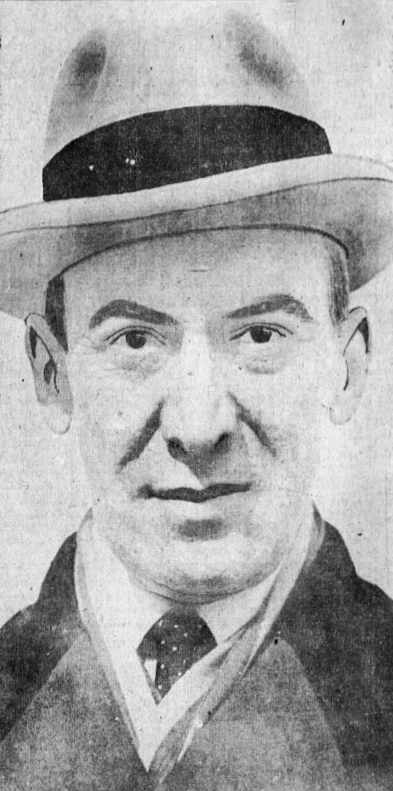
Lawson Robertson, 1927

A track star by his Senior year in High School, he was recruited to join the accomplished Irish American Athletic Club in Queens, New York, by their coach Lawson Robertson, who would be both an American Olympic medalist and Olympic Track coach. Joining the club at age 17, he was made a team captain by 1910.

In 1908, at Travers Island, he won the Junior Championship for one mile for the Metropolitan District, making the fast time of 4:24. In the same year, he won the Baxter Cup in the Columbia University races at Madison Square Garden, making the fast time of 4:23 2–5. He broke the world's record in the 2,400 yard relay race, his time for his 600 yards being 1:16 and 5:4 for the entire distance. He also won the Canadian mile championship in 1909 and again in 1910.

He set a 1500 meter world record of 3:55.8 minutes in Cambridge, Massachusetts in June 1912. In the same year, he set the world record for 1500 meters three times in 15 days; during the third effort, Harvard stadium was sold out with 15,000 in attendance – referenced in "The Milers" by Cordner Nelson.

=== Olympic silver medal ===
He competed for the U.S. Olympic Team as a member of the Irish American Athletic Club. He won a silver medal in the 1500 m at the Olympic Games in Stockholm 1912. For the first time, the Olympics used a photo finish to determine who won the medal. With Kiviat leading until the final lap of the 1500, English gold medal winner Arnold Jackson outkicked him in the final stretch at a last turn in the track. Kiviat called the loss "the greatest disappointment of my life."

In Stockholm, he also raced on the gold-medal US team in the 3000 m relay and competed for the US team in the exhibition baseball tournament. During the trip to Sweden in 1912, he was cabin mates with Jim Thorpe, a much renowned Native American athlete.

After serving on the front lines with the US Army in France in WWI, he continued his athletic career until 1925. After retirement from competition, he acted as an official at track meets for 60 years and served as chief press steward at the Penn Relays and many Madison Square Garden meets. He later participated in the Olympic Torch Relay before the 1984 Olympics.

In 1984, Kiviat, who was Jewish, was inducted into the International Jewish Sports Hall of Fame, in 1985, he was inducted into the USA Track & Field Hall of Fame, and in 2023 he was inducted into the National Jewish Sports Hall of Fame.

He died of prostate cancer on August 24, 1991, at his home in Lakehurst, New Jersey. Aged 99, he was the oldest living Olympian. He was survived by a son Arthur, two brothers and a grandchild. He was predeceased by his wife Isabelle.

== Legacy ==
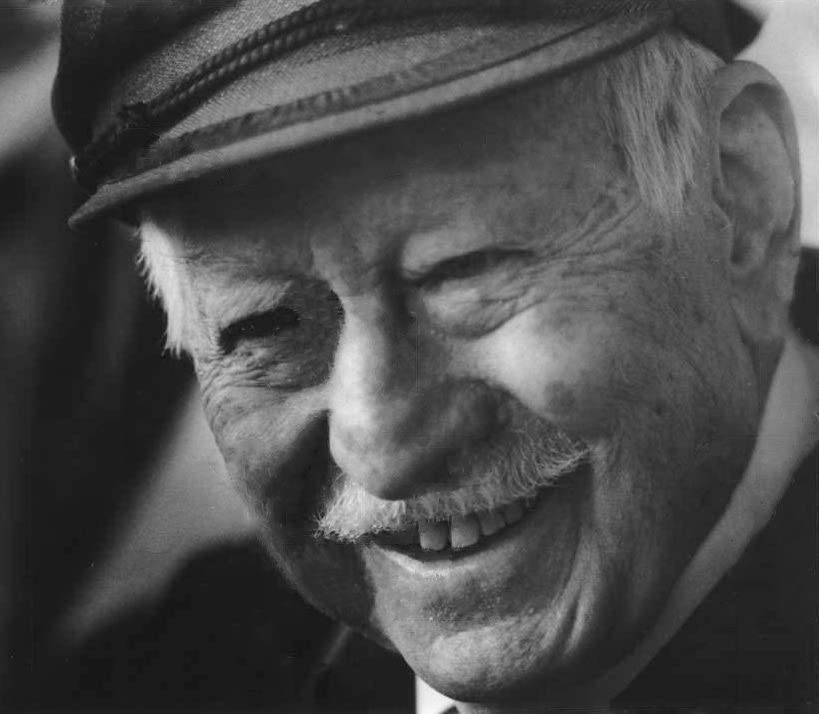
Kiviat in 1988

The Abel R. Kiviat Memorial race is held annually at his alma mater, Curtis High School, in Staten Island, New York.

== See also ==
- List of select Jewish track and field athletes
- Staten Island Sports Hall of Fame

== Notes ==
Records
| Preceded by — | Men's 1500 m World Record Holder; June 1, 1912 – August 5, 1917 | Succeeded by John Zander |
