= Thorild Olsson =

Swedish long-distance runner

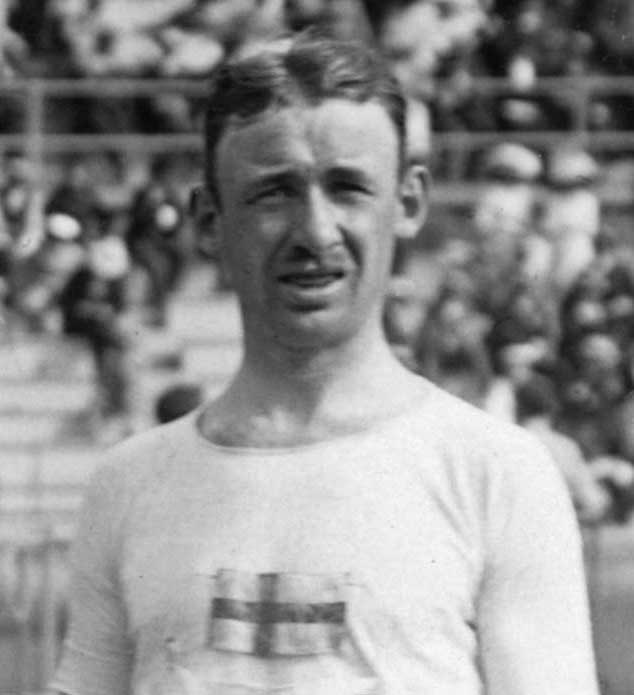

Personal information
- Born: 26 November 1886 Gothenburg, Sweden
- Died: 20 March 1934 (aged 48) Gothenburg, Sweden
- Height: 173 cm (5 ft 8 in)
- Weight: 61 kg (134 lb)

Sport
- Sport: Athletics
- Event: 1500–5000 m
- Club: Örgryte IS

Achievements and titles
- Personal best(s): 1500 m – 4:07.14 (1911); 5000 m – 15:25.2 (1912)

Thorild Olsson (26 November 1886 – 19 March 1934) was a Swedish runner who competed in the 1912 Summer Olympics in Stockholm. He helped the Swedes win Silver in the men's 3000 m teams race. Each team consisted of 5 runners starting simultaneously, but only the placings of the first 3 in each team counted. The final consisted of teams from the US, Sweden and Great Britain. USA won the event with places 1, 3 and 5 while the Swedes, with Thorild Olsson 2nd, Ernst Wide 4th and Bror Fock 7th, took silver. Olsson's time of 8:44.6 would have been a world record before the 1912 games. (Translated from Swedish by his grandson, who has seen photos of him finishing second.)
