= John Zander =

Swedish middle-distance runner (1890–1967)

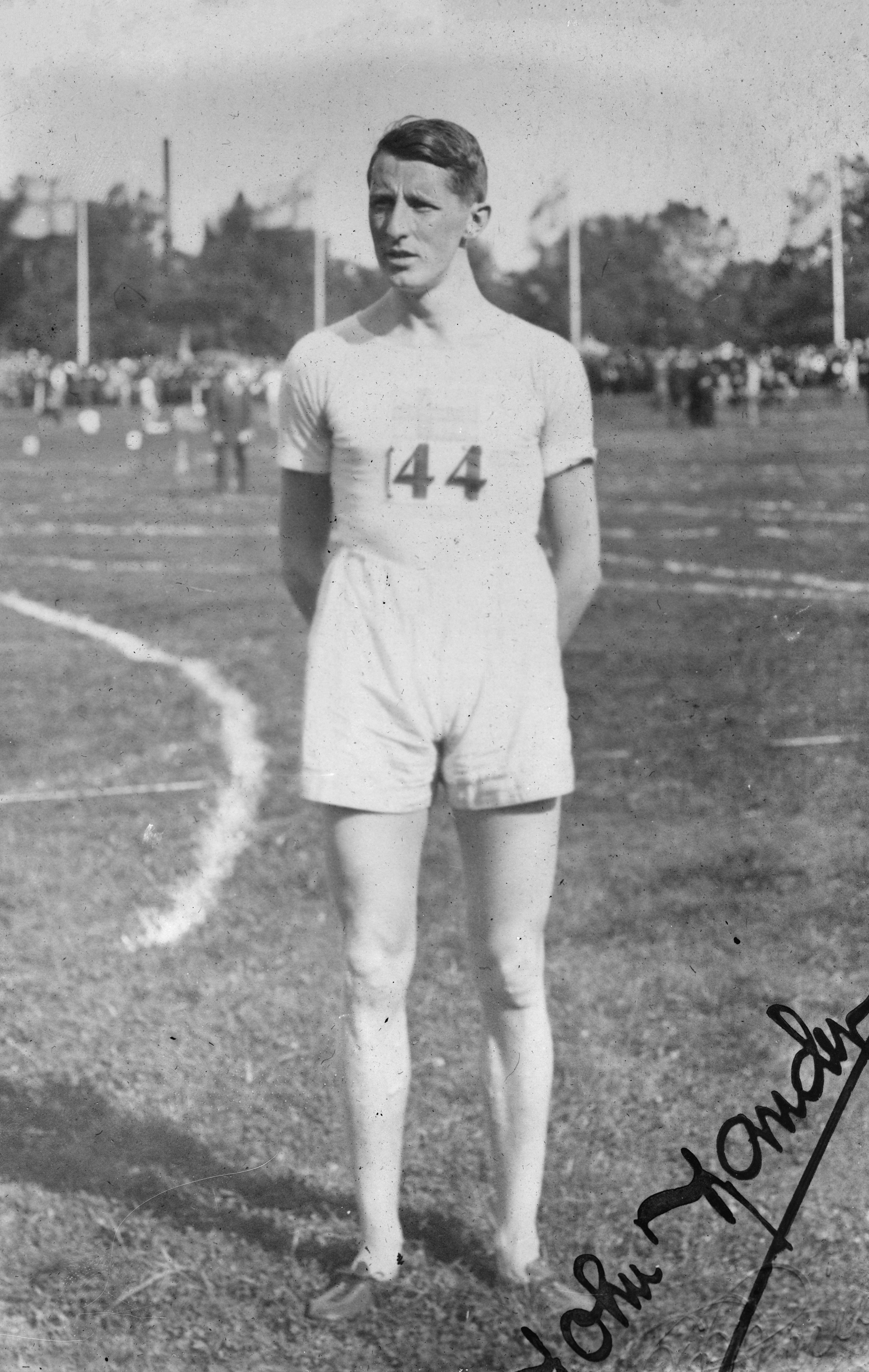
- John Zander

Personal information
- Born: 31 January 1890 Stockholm, Sweden
- Died: 9 June 1967 (aged 77) Stockholm, Sweden
- Height: 1.80 m (5 ft 11 in)
- Weight: 66 kg (146 lb)

Sport
- Sport: Athletics
- Event: 800–10000 m
- Club: Mariebergs IK

Achievements and titles
- Personal bests: 800 m – 1:58.2 (1916); 1500 m – 3:54.7 (1917); Mile – 4:16.8 (1918); 5000 m – 14:57.5 (1918); 10000 m – 32:59.8 (1915)

John Adolf Fredrik Zander (31 January 1890 – 9 June 1967) was a Swedish middle-distance runner who competed at the 1912 and 1920 Summer Olympics in the 1500 m and 3000 m events.

== Career ==
Zander represented Sweden at the 1912 Olympic Games in his home country of Sweden. He finished seventh and tenth, respectively. Although his 3,000 m team placed second, he did not receive a medal because only three of the best runners from the team were counted, while he was fourth. The 1916 Olympics were cancelled due to World War I. At the 1920 Games, Zander failed to finish his 1500 m race. He helped Sweden to qualify for the final in the 3000 metre team race, but he did not run in the final, in which Sweden won the bronze medal.

Nationally, Zander won ten Swedish titles in the 800 m (1912–13), 1,500 m (1913, 1915–18), steeplechase (1915) and 5,000 m (1917–18). He also won the British AAA Championships title in the 1 mile event at the 1913 AAA Championships, the 3,000 and 5,000 m events at the 1914 Baltic Games, and four events at the 1916 Swedish Games. He semi-retired in 1918 and had a rib injury while preparing for the 1920 Olympics. During his career, he set Swedish records in the 1,500 and 5,000 m and world records over 1,500, 2,000 and 3,000 metres. In retirement he worked as an actuary for the Pension Board in Stockholm.

Records
Preceded by (United States) Abel Kiviat	Men's 1,500 m World Record Holder; 5 August 1917 – 19 June 1924	Succeeded by (Finland) Paavo Nurmi
Preceded by (Finland) Hannes Kolehmainen	Men's 3,000 m World Record Holder; 12 July 1917 – 27 August 1922	Succeeded by (Finland) Paavo Nurmi
Preceded by —	European Record Holder Men's 1500m 5 August 1917 – 18 June 1924	Succeeded by (Finland) Paavo Nurmi
