= Athletics at the 1908 Summer Olympics – Men's marathon =

Men's marathon at the Games of the IV Olympiad
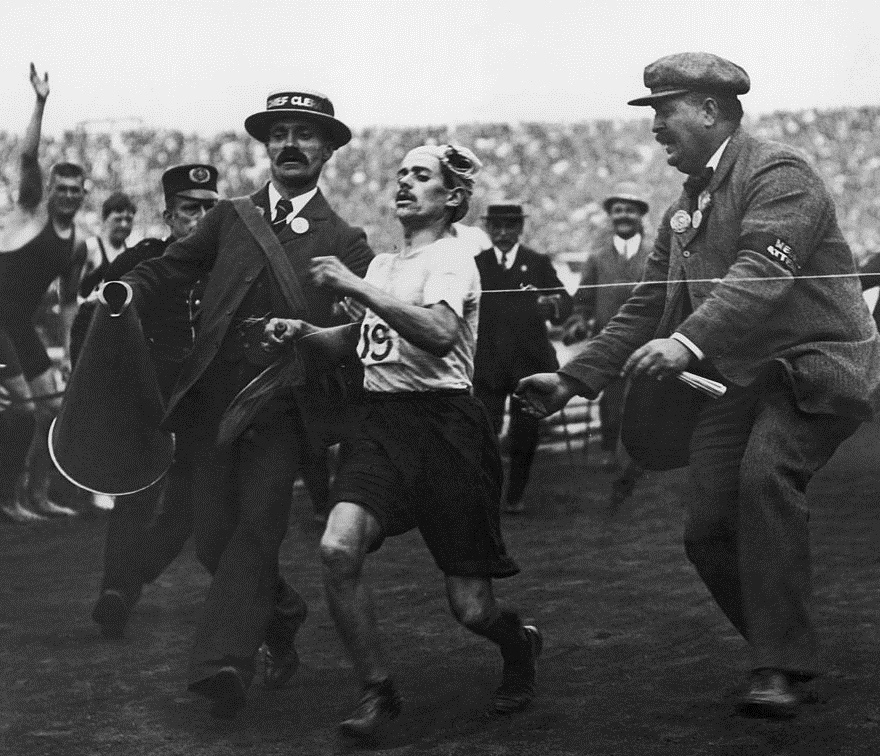
- Dorando Pietri finishes the marathon
- Venue: London
- Dates: 24 July 1908
- Competitors: 55 from 16 nations
- Winning time: 2:55:18.4 OR

Medalists
1st place, gold medalist(s)		Johnny Hayes; United States
2nd place, silver medalist(s)		Charles Hefferon; South Africa
3rd place, bronze medalist(s)		Joseph Forshaw; United States

1908 Olympics Highlights Montage: Marathon Starts @ 5:33

The men's marathon race of the 1908 Summer Olympics took place in London on 24 July 1908. Johnny Hayes won after Dorando Pietri was disqualified for having received assistance before the finish line. For the first time in an Olympic marathon, the distance was 26 mi 385 yd (42.195 km), which would become the standard distance in 1921. 75 competitors entered the race, of whom 55 from 16 nations started, with 27 from 11 nations finishing. NOCs could enter up to 12 athletes. Charles Hefferon's silver medal earned South Africa its first Olympic marathon medal.

== Background ==
This was the fourth appearance of the event, which is one of twelve athletics events to have been held at every Summer Olympics. Sidney Hatch of the United States was the only runner from 1904 (8th then) to return; Frederick Lorz, who had finished first but was disqualified because he had ridden most of the way, was entered but did not start. The 1908 marathon had "by far the most international field yet assembled for a marathon" with sixteen nations represented. The United States, Canada, and Great Britain each entered full teams of twelve runners, though five Americans and one Briton withdrew before the start.

Australasia, Austria, Belgium, Bohemia, Denmark, Finland, Germany, Italy, the Netherlands, and Russia each made their first appearance in the event. The United States was the only nation to have runners in each of the first four Olympic marathons.

== Course ==
At a meeting of the International Olympic Committee in The Hague in May 1907 it was agreed with the British Olympic Association that the 1908 Olympics would include a marathon of about 25 miles or 40 kilometres.

The British Olympic Council handed responsibility for organising the Marathon to the Amateur Athletic Association, but they had no experience at organising a road race of such a length. In late 1907, an offer was made by Jack M Andrew, honorary secretary of the Polytechnic Harriers, to take over the task. This was accepted in February 1908, though already, in November 1907, a route of "about 25 to 26 miles in distance" had been published in the newspapers, starting at Windsor Castle and finishing at the Olympic Stadium, the White City Stadium in Shepherd's Bush in London.

The Polytechnic Harriers were also tasked with organising a Marathon Trial Race, to be run along most of the Olympic Marathon route. By April 1908, a revised map of the course of the Trial Race was published, also showing the intended course of the Olympic Marathon. It had by this time been decided to fix the Olympic Marathon distance at "about 26 miles" to the stadium, plus a lap of the track (1,760 ft (536.45 m)), using the Royal Entrance as the marathon tunnel, and finishing at the normal stadium finishing-line in front of the Royal Box. The April 1908 map shows the intended finish, though the White City stadium was not yet complete at that time.

The full Olympic route was thus from Windsor, via Eton, Slough, Langley, Uxbridge, Ickenham, Ruislip, Harrow, Sudbury, Wembley, Willesden, and Wormwood Scrubs, to White City Stadium.

For the official Trial Marathon on 25 April 1908, the start was 700 yards (640 m) from Queen Victoria's statue in Windsor on ‘The Long Walk’ – a magnificent avenue leading up to Windsor Castle in the grounds of Windsor Great Park. The Trial Marathon would finish about four miles short of the full distance, in Wembley.

Since the start of planning it had been hoped that for the Olympic Marathon itself the start would be on the East Lawn near the private East Terrace of Windsor Castle, with the permission of King Edward VII, so that the public would not interfere with the start. This permission was granted.

With the start now securely within the private grounds of Windsor Castle, the Princess of Wales and her children drove from their home at Frogmore on the far side of Windsor Great Park to watch the start of the race.

Shortly before the Games opened it was realised that the Royal Entrance could not be used as the marathon entrance—it was raised to permit easy descent by the royal party from their carriages, and did not open onto the track—so an alternative entrance was chosen, diagonally opposite the Royal Box. A special path was made from Du Cane Road running due south just east of the Franco British Exhibition ground so that the distance from Windsor to the stadium remained "about 26 miles". The finishing line was left unchanged, but in order that more of the spectators would have a good view of the final yards, the direction of running was changed to "right-hand inside" (i.e. clockwise). This meant the distance in the stadium was shortened from a full lap of the track to 385 yards (352 m), and the total distance became officially "about 26 miles plus 385 yards on the track". A modified version of the Polytechnic Harriers' April 1908 map was issued in June 1908 incorporating the changed ending and omitting the "Long Walk" start used for the Trial Marathon. This was published in the newspapers and in the official programme for the games.

This distance (ignoring the word "about" in the phrase "about 26 miles plus 385 yards on the track") eventually became the origin of the modern Marathon distance of "no less than 42.195 km".

According to the book The Marathon Makers by John Bryant, the first mile of the 1908 Olympic Marathon course was remeasured by John Disley in the late 1990s and was found to be 174 yards (159 m) short. The “short” yards claim seems to be linked to John Disley confusing the start location, putting it forward from where the marathon race actually started.

On the 24 July 2024, the 116th anniversary of the race, The Guardian newspaper reported the re-measuring of the opening 700 yards of the reconstructed marathon course by Hugh Jones, assisted by Joe Neanor.

The results of this exercise, along with contemporary photographic evidence, and information in the official report strongly indicated that the marathon course had been accurately measured in 1908, the full distance run, with the race starting on the path beside the East Lawn, within the grounds of Windsor Castle.

A note about the measuring exercise has been donated to the University of Westminster.

== Summary ==
The official report lists the leaders at each mile from the fourth to the twenty-fourth: Thomas Jack (miles 4–5); Frederick Lord (miles 6–14); Charles Hefferon (miles 15–24). Dorando Pietri of Italy caught Hefferon and sped up between Old Oak Common Lane and Wormwood Scrubs.

Dorando Pietri, Italy, began his race at a rather slow pace, but in the second half of the course began a powerful surge moving him into second position by the 32 km (20 mi) mark, 4 minutes behind South African Charles Hefferon. Hefferon, by his own account, made a "mistake" with less than two miles to go: he accepted a drink of champagne, which he said gave him a cramp. When he knew that Hefferon was in crisis, Pietri further increased his pace, overtaking him at the 39 km (24 mi) mark.

The effort took its toll and with only two kilometres to go, Pietri began to feel the effects of extreme fatigue and dehydration. When he entered the stadium, he took the wrong path and when umpires redirected him, he fell down for the first time. He got up with their help, in front of 75,000 spectators.

He fell four more times, and each time the umpires helped him up. In the end, though totally exhausted, he managed to finish the race in first place. Of his total time of 2h 54min 46s, ten minutes were needed for that last 350 metres. Second was American Johnny Hayes, with a time of 2h 55min 18s. The American team immediately lodged a complaint against the help Pietri received from the umpires. The complaint was accepted and Pietri was disqualified and removed from the final standings of the race. Since Pietri was not responsible for his disqualification, Queen Alexandra awarded him the gilded silver cup the next day in recognition of his heroics.

Hefferon, though he had been passed by Pietri and then by Hayes "on nearing the Stadium," was able to cross the line third ahead of two more Americans (Joseph Forshaw and Alton Welton), with Pietri's disqualification giving Hefferon silver and Forshaw bronze.

== Records ==
These were the standing world and Olympic records (in hours) prior to the 1908 Summer Olympics.

World record	William Sherring (CAN)	2:51:23.6(**)	Athens, Greece	1 May 1906 (NS)
Olympic record	Spyridon Louis (GRE)	2'58:50(*)	Athens, Greece	10 April 1896 (NS)

(*) distance 40.0 km

(**) distance 41.86 km

Johnny Hayes set a new Olympic record with 2:55:18.4 hours.

== Schedule ==
Date	Time	Round
Friday, 24 July 1908	14:33	Final

== Results ==
Rank	Athlete	Nation	Time	Notes
1st place, gold medalist(s)	Johnny Hayes	United States	2:55:18.4	WR/OR
2nd place, silver medalist(s)	Charles Hefferon	South Africa	2:56:06.0	
3rd place, bronze medalist(s)	Joseph Forshaw	United States	2:57:10.4	
4	Alton Welton	United States	2:59:44.4	
5	William Wood	Canada	3:01:44.0	
6	Frederick Simpson	Canada	3:04:28.2	
7	Harry Lawson	Canada	3:06:47.2	
8	John Svanberg	Sweden	3:07:50.8	
9	Lewis Tewanima	United States	3:09:15.0	
10	Kalle Nieminen	Finland	3:09:50.8	
11	Jack Caffery	Canada	3:12:46.0	
12	Tommy Clarke	Great Britain	3:16:08.6	
13	Ernest Barnes	Great Britain	3:17:30.8	
14	Sidney Hatch	United States	3:17:52.4	
15	Frederick Lord	Great Britain	3:19:08.8	
16	William Goldsboro	Canada	3:20:07.0	
17	James Beale	Great Britain	3:20:14.0	
18	Arnošt Nejedlý	Bohemia	3:26:26.2	
19	Georg Lind	Russian Empire (Note: Georg Lind was a Latvian living in London.)	3:26:38.8	
20	Willem Wakker	Netherlands	3:28:49.0	
21	Gustaf Törnros	Sweden	3:30:20.8	
22	George Goulding	Canada	3:33:26.4	
23	Julius Jørgensen	Denmark	3:47:44.0	
24	Arthur Burn	Canada	3:50:17.0	
25	Emmerich Rath	Austria	3:50:30.4	
26	Rudy Hansen	Denmark	3:53:15.0	
27	George Lister	Canada	4:22:45.0	
—	Victor Aitken	Australasia	DNF	
—	Fred Appleby	Great Britain	DNF	
—	Henry Barrett	Great Britain	DNF	
—	George Blake	Australasia	DNF	
—	Umberto Blasi	Italy	DNF	
—	Wilhelmus Braams	Netherlands	DNF	
—	George Buff	Netherlands	DNF	
—	François Celis	Belgium	DNF	
—	Edward Cotter	Canada	DNF	
—	Alexander Duncan	Great Britain	DNF	
—	Thomas Jack	Great Britain	DNF	
—	Nikolaos Kouloumberdas	Greece	DNF	
—	Anastasios Koutoulakis	Greece	DNF	
—	Seth Landqvist	Sweden	DNF	
—	Johan Lindqvist	Sweden	DNF	
—	Tom Longboat	Canada	DNF	
—	Joseph Lynch	Australasia	DNF	
—	James Mitchell Baker	South Africa	DNF	
—	Thomas Morrissey	United States	DNF	
—	Frederick Noseworthy	Canada	DNF	
—	Jack Price	Great Britain	DNF	
—	Fritz Reiser	Germany	DNF	
—	Michael Ryan	United States	DNF	
—	John Tait	Canada	DNF	
—	Frederick Thompson	Great Britain	DNF	
—	Arie Vosbergen	Netherlands	DNF	
—	Albert Wyatt	Great Britain	DNF	
—	Thure Bergvall	Sweden	DNS	
—	Augusto Cocca	Italy	DNS	
—	Felix Kwieton	Austria	DNS	
—	James J. Lee	United States	DNS	
—	Frederick Lorz	United States	DNS	
—	Ivar Lundberg	Sweden	DNS	
—	Lajos Merényi	Hungary	DNS	
—	Alfred Mole	South Africa	DNS	
—	Hermann Müller	Germany	DNS	
—	Paul Nettelbeck	Germany	DNS	
—	James W. O'Mara	United States	DNS	
—	Georg Peterson	Sweden	DNS	
—	C. E. Stevens	South Africa	DNS	
—	Samuel Stevenson	Great Britain	DNS	
—	Willem Theunissen	Netherlands	DNS	
—	Alexander Thibeau	United States	DNS	
—	Vincent	South Africa	DNS	
—	W. Wood	United States	DNS	
—	Dorando Pietri	Italy	2:54:46.4	DSQ

== Aftermath ==
The dramatic finish of the 1908 Olympic marathon led to worldwide marathon fever. In a postcard sent at the time, an American spectator said he had "just seen the greatest race of the century." Since Pietri himself had not been responsible for his disqualification, Queen Alexandra the next day awarded him a gold- (or perhaps silver-) gilt cup in recognition of his achievement.

Pietri and Hayes both turned professional and there were several re-matches over the distance of 26 miles 385 yards. Many other marathons adopted that distance, including the important Polytechnic Marathon. The IAAF minutes are reportedly silent as to the reason the 26 miles 385 yards (42.195 km) was chosen in 1921, so any conclusion must be speculative, but regardless of any possible emotional attachment to the distance of the "race of the century", the London 1908 distance had established itself worldwide by that time. Marathons became an annual event in London following the 1908 Olympics. The Polytechnic Marathon was held each year until 1996.

All of the finishers, including Pietri, were awarded Diplomas of Merit.

== In popular culture ==
Il sogno del maratoneta is an Italian book and TV movie about Pietri's run.

== Sources ==
- Burnton, Simon (29 February 2012). "Dorando Pietri's marathon, 1908". 50 stunning Olympic moments. London: The Guardian.
