= Athletics at the 1908 Summer Olympics – Men's 5 miles =

Men's 5 miles at the Games of the IV Olympiad
- Venue: White City Stadium
- Dates: 15 July 1908 (semifinals); 18 July 1908 (final)
- Competitors: 36 from 14 nations

Medalists
1st place, gold medalist(s)		Emil Voigt	Great Britain
2nd place, silver medalist(s)		Edward Owen	Great Britain
3rd place, bronze medalist(s)		John Svanberg	Sweden

The men's 5 miles race was held at the 1908 Summer Olympics in London. It was discontinued after that in favour of the metric races of 5,000 metres and 10,000 metres. The competition was held on 15 and 19 July 1908. 36 runners from 14 nations competed; seven from Great Britain, five from Sweden, four each from the United States, Canada and the Netherlands, two each from Denmark, France and Australasia, and one each from Hungary, South Africa, Greece, Germany, Bohemia and Italy. There were six preliminary heats, with the winner and the four runners-up with the best time advancing to the final. NOCs could enter up to 12 athletes.

== Records ==
These are the standing world and Olympic records (in minutes) prior to the 1908 Summer Olympics. The 5 miles (8.0 km) race was only held twice at the Olympics, in 1906 and 1908.

World record	24:33.2	(United Kingdom) Alfred Shrubb	Stamford Bridge (GBR)	May 1904
Olympic record	26:11.8	(United Kingdom) Henry Hawtrey	Athens (GRE)	1906

== Results ==
=== First round ===
All first round heats were held on 15 July 1908.

==== Heat 1 ====
Ragueneau retired in the first quarter-mile. Coales dropped out after about four miles (6 km). Hefferon led for about half the race before Svanberg passed him.

Intermediate times: 1 mile 4:52.0, 2 miles 10:02.8, 3 miles 15:10.4, 4 miles 20:29.4

Rank	Athlete	Nation	Time	Notes
1	John Svanberg	Sweden	25:46.2	Q
2	Charles Hefferon	South Africa	26:05.0	q
3	George Blake	Australasia	Unknown	
—	William Coales	Great Britain	DNF	
—	Gaston Ragueneau	France	DNF	

==== Heat 2 ====
Voigt broke away from the pack at about four miles (6 km).

Intermediate times: 1 mile 5:06.2, 2 miles 10:40.0, 3 miles 16:06.0, 4 miles 21:16.0

Rank	Athlete	Nation	Time	Notes
1	Emil Voigt	Great Britain	26:13.4	Q
2	Frederick Bellars	United States	26:45.0	q
3	Pericle Pagliani	Italy	26:56.4	
4	Kjeld Nielsen	Denmark	27:04.8	
—	Willem Wakker	Netherlands	DNF	
—	Nikolaos Kouloumberdas	Greece	DNF	
—	Edward Dahl	Sweden	DNF	

==== Heat 3 ====
Landqvist led the entire way, gradually pulling away from the rest of the runners.

Intermediate times: 1 mile 5:07.6, 2 miles 10:32.6, 3 miles 15:53.4, 4 miles 21:26.2

Rank	Athlete	Nation	Time	Notes
1	Seth Landqvist	Sweden	27:00.2	Q
2	Edward Carr	United States	27:24.4	
3	Julius Jørgensen	Denmark	28:08.8	
4	Charles Hall	United States	28:24.0	
5	Paul Nettelbeck	Germany	28:31.6	
—	Wilhelmus Braams	Netherlands	DNF	

==== Heat 4 ====
Intermediate times: 1 mile 4:49.6, 2 miles 9:59.8, 3 miles 15:12.4, 4 miles 20:31.4

Murphy was in the lead for the entirety of the race.

Rank	Athlete	Nation	Time	Notes
1	James Murphy	Great Britain	25:59.2	Q
2	Frederick Meadows	Canada	26:16.2	q
3	Georg Peterson	Sweden	26:50.4	
4	Paul Lizandier	France	27:10.8	
—	Joe Deakin	Great Britain	DNF	
—	John Tait	Canada	DNF	
—	Jacques Keyser	Netherlands	DNF	

==== Heat 5 ====
Fitzgerald, Robertson, and Stevenson were close together for the first mile, then Robertson broke away. This left Fitzgerald and Stevenson to fight over second place.

Intermediate times: 1 mile 4:52.8, 2 miles 10:02.6, 3 miles 15:18.4, 4 miles 20:37.4

Rank	Athlete	Nation	Time	Notes
1	Arthur Robertson	Great Britain	25:50.2	Q
2	James Fitzgerald	Canada	26:05.8	q
3	Samuel Stevenson	Great Britain	26:17.0	
—	Axel Wiegandt	Sweden	DNF	
—	Joseph Lynch	Australasia	DNF	
—	Arie Vosbergen	Netherlands	DNF	
—	Herbert Trube	United States	DNF	

==== Heat 6 ====
Owen had the largest margin of victory in the preliminary heats, defeating Galbraith by a full lap of the track.

Intermediate times: 1 mile 4:46.8, 2 miles 9:56.0, 3 miles 15:19.2, 4 miles 20:51.0

Rank	Athlete	Nation	Time	Notes
1	Edward Owen	Great Britain	26:12.0	Q
2	William Galbraith	Canada	27:23.3	
3	Arnošt Nejedlý	Bohemia	28:29.8	
—	Antal Lovas	Hungary	DNF	

=== Final ===
The final was held on 18 July 1908.

Fitzgerald, Murphy, Owen, Svanberg, Hefferon, and Voigt led at various times during the final. Owen led after one mile (1.6 km) reached in 4:46.2, with Hefferon leading at the two and three mile (5 km) marks, with times of 9:54.2 and 15:05.6. After four miles (6 km), Svanberg was in front, with a time of 20:19.2. In the last two laps, Voigt sprinted to the lead which he kept until the end of the contest. He won the race setting a new Olympic record. As the competition has been discontinued, his Olympic record still stands.

Rank	Athlete	Nation	Time	Notes
1st place, gold medalist(s)	Emil Voigt	Great Britain	25:11.2	OR
2nd place, silver medalist(s)	Edward Owen	Great Britain	25:24.0	
3rd place, bronze medalist(s)	John Svanberg	Sweden	25:37.2	
4	Charles Hefferon	South Africa	25:44.0	
5	Arthur Robertson	Great Britain	26:13.0	
6	Frederick Meadows	Canada	26:16.2	
7	James Fitzgerald	Canada	Unknown	
8	Frederick Bellars	United States	Unknown	
9	Seth Landqvist	Sweden	Unknown	
—	James Murphy	Great Britain	DNF	

== Sources ==
- Cook, Theodore Andrea (1908). The Fourth Olympiad, Being the Official Report. London: British Olympic Association.
- De Wael, Herman (2001). "Athletics 1908". Herman's Full Olympians. Archived from the original on 27 September 2006.
- Wudarski, Pawel (1999). "Wyniki Igrzysk Olimpijskich" (in Polish).
