= Thomas Morrissey (athlete) =

American athletics competitor

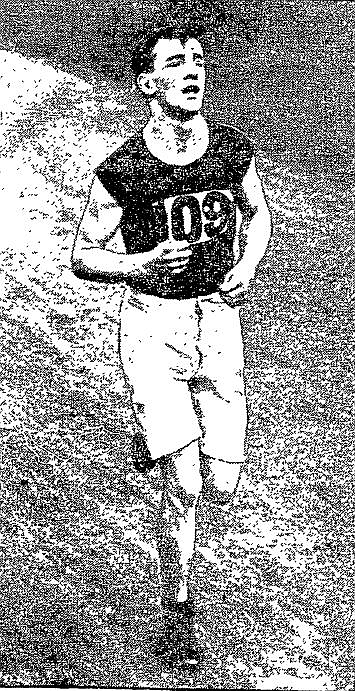
Thomas Morrissey at 1908 Boston Marathon

Tom Morrissey

Thomas Patrick Morrissey (2 September 1888 – 1 October 1968) was an American long-distance runner who won the Boston Marathon in 1908.

== Career ==
Tom Morrissey was born to Irish immigrants in 1888 at Yonkers, New York. His mother opened a boarding house after his father, a horseshoer, died a young man, leaving eight children, and Morrissey left school after the eighth grade.

Morrissey was a member of the Mercury Athletic Club that was established at Yonkers by Sammy Mellor. He entered the Boston Marathon four times between 1906 and 1909. In 1906, he finished in third place, but the next year, he finished only seventeenth. Later that year (1907), he won the national indoor 25-mile championship in New York and then placed tenth at the inaugural Yonkers Marathon. He had trained by running ten to fifteen miles every second day and walking on the other days. Every three weeks he ran a twenty-miler. On March 24, 1908 he won an indoor 25-mile race in Brooklyn, New York "by a mile."

One month after his Brooklyn race, he entered the Boston Marathon for the third time. He was only in ninth place, passing through the five-mile point at South Framingham, but worked his way through the field until he passed the leader, Robert Fowler, two miles from the finish line. His time was 2:25:43.2, the second fastest time ever on the course at that time after Tom Longboat's record the previous year.

On the basis of his performance at the Boston Marathon, Morrissey was selected to represent the United States at the 1908 Olympic Games in London, where he entered the Marathon, but did not finish the event on a hot and humid day.

In 1909, he entered the Boston Marathon for a final time but began to walk at the Wellesley Hills (about the 13-mile point) on another hot and humid day and dropped out of that race. Morrissey then joined the professional ranks, and on May 6 participated in a Marathon Derby at the Polo Grounds in New York City featuring twelve prominent marathoners including Tom Longboat, Dorando Pietri, John Svanberg, Felix Carvajal, Fred Appleby, Fred Simpson, and Henri St. Yves, who won the race. Morrissey collapsed after seventeen and a half miles and had to be carried from the field. He continued to enter professional races over the next two years without any notable successes.

In later life he joined the Yonkers Police force, and worked his way up to the rank of captain. He died in 1968 at the age of eighty at Yonkers.
