= Noseworthy =

Noseworthy is an English surname. Notable people with the surname include:

- Elizabeth Fitzsimmons (née Noseworthy) (born 1972/73), American diplomat
- Fred Noseworthy (1871–1942), Canadian track and field athlete
- Joseph W. Noseworthy (1888–1956), Canadian politician
- Mark Noseworthy, Canadian musician and composer

== Disambiguation pages ==
- John Noseworthy (disambiguation)

== See also ==
- Nosworthy
