= Ernest Barnes (athlete) =

British athlete

Personal information
- Nationality: British (English)
- Born: 8 January 1884 Duffield, England
- Died: 28 August 1956 (aged 72) Belper, England

Sport
- Sport: Athletics
- Event: long-distance
- Club: Derby & County AC

Ernest Barnes (8 January 1884 – 28 August 1956) was a British track and field athlete who competed in the 1908 Summer Olympics.

== Biography ==
Barnes was a member of the Derby & County AC, where he was vice-captain below fellow Olympian Harry Sewell and in 1907 helped the club win the Midlands junior cross-country title.

Barnes represented Great Britain at the 1908 Summer Olympics in London, and finished 13th in the men's marathon. He was only one of four British athletes to complete the race. Despite being the first Briton into the stadium, he finished one place behind William Clarke, the leading Briton.

In 1909, Barnes won the Derby's 10-mile championship race in 1909 and finished 10th in the International Cross Country Championships at Derby.

Barnes built his own house using his skills as a bricklayer and master builder and later became the landlord of the Homesford Cottage Inn at Whatstandwell, Derbyshire.
