= Athletics at the 1908 Summer Olympics – Men's 3200 metres steeplechase =

Men's 3200 metre steeplechase at the Games of the IV Olympiad
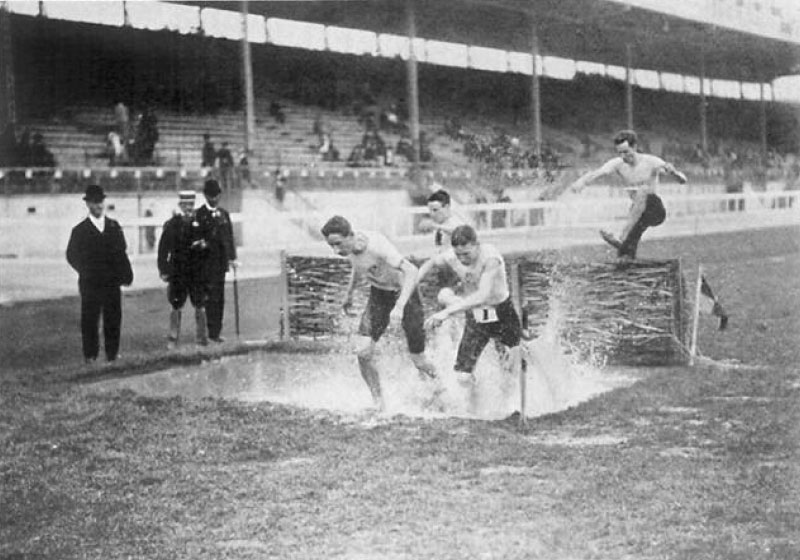
- The water jump
- Venue: White City Stadium
- Dates: July 17, 1908 (semifinals); July 18, 1908 (final)
- Competitors: 24 from 6 nations

Medalists
1st place, gold medalist(s)		Arthur Russell	Great Britain
2nd place, silver medalist(s)		Archie Robertson	Great Britain
3rd place, bronze medalist(s)		John Eisele	United States

The men's 3,200 metres steeplechase was held for the only time at the 1908 Summer Olympics in London. The competition was held on July 17 and 18, 1908. The races were held on a track 536.45 metres=1/3 mile in circumference. There were six heats in the first round, with the winners competing in the final.

24 runners from 6 nations competed; eleven from Great Britain, eight from the United States, two from Canada, two from France, one from Hungary, and one from Italy. NOCs could enter up to 12 athletes.

== Records ==
These were the standing world and Olympic records (in minutes) before the 1908 Summer Olympics.

World record		none		
Olympic Record	7:34.4(*)	(Canada) George Orton	Paris (FRA)	July 15, 1900
Olympic Record	7:39.6(**)	(United States) James Lightbody	St. Louis (USA)	August 29, 1904

(*) The distance of this race was 2500 metres, and the track was 500 metres in circumference.

(**) The distance of this race was 2590 metres, and the track was 536.45 metres=1/3 mile in circumference.

== Results ==
=== First round ===
All first-round heats were held on Friday, July 17, 1908.

==== Heat 1 ====
Russell beat Cartasegna by 100 yards. Downing was disqualified for incorrectly clearing the first water jump, while Ragueneau dropped out on the second lap and Carr injured his ankle.

Place	Name	Nation	Time
1	Arthur Russell	Great Britain	10:56.2
2	Massimo Cartasegna	Italy	11:15.0
—	Gaston Ragueneau	France	DNF
—	Edward Carr	United States	DNF
—	Thomas Downing	Great Britain	DSQ

==== Heat 2 ====
Eisele was the only one to finish: de Fleurac led early, but was caught before the water jump and pulled up lame, while English fell, and Lovas and Buckley dropped out trying to keep the pace.

Place	Name	Nation	Time
1	John Eisele	United States	11:13.6
—	Antal Lovas	Hungary	DNF
—	Louis de Fleurac	France	DNF
—	Fred Buckley	Great Britain	DNF
—	Joseph English	Great Britain	DNF

==== Heat 3 ====
Barker pulled up lame on the last lap, leaving Galbraith with the win.

Place	Name	Nation	Time
1	William Galbraith	Canada	11:12.4
—	Henry Barker	Great Britain	DNF

==== Heat 4 ====
With Yorke being disqualified for obstruction and Bonhag injured, the race was between Robertson and Dull. Dull led at first, but Robertson passed him and won by two hundred yards.

Place	Name	Nation	Time
1	Archie Robertson	Great Britain	11:10.0
2	Gayle Dull	United States	(11:50.0)
—	George Bonhag	United States	DNF
—	Richard Yorke	Great Britain	DSQ

==== Heat 5 ====
The Americans had little chance of catching up with Holdaway and Kinchin; Holdaway was a hundred yards ahead at the finish.

Place	Name	Nation	Time
1	Guy Holdaway	Great Britain	11:18.8
2	Joseph Kinchin	Great Britain	(11:44.0)
3	Roland Spitzer	United States	unknown
4	Charles Hall	United States	unknown

==== Heat 6 ====
After Fitzgerald fell and Grantham pulled up lame, Sewell and Lightbody competed right up to the finish, when Sewell pulled away at the end to win a tight race by less than ten yards.

Place	Name	Nation	Time
1	Harry Sewell	Great Britain	11:30.2
2	James Lightbody	United States	11:41.0
—	James Fitzgerald	Canada	DNF
—	Billy Grantham	Great Britain	DNF

=== Final ===
The final was held on Saturday, July 18, 1908.

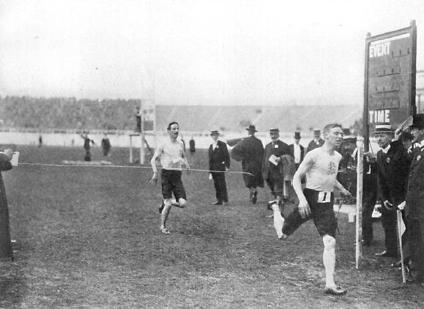
Arthur Russell finishing first in front of Archie Robertson.

Holdaway was the first to lead, but did not do so for long. Galbraith and Russell were the leaders for most of the first half of the race, until Galbraith fell back and Eisele joined Russell at the front. After the bell, Robertson passed Eisele and nearly caught Russell, trailing by only two yards when the two crossed the finish line.

Place	Name	Nation	Time
1	Arthur Russell	Great Britain	10:47.8
2	Archie Robertson	Great Britain	10:48.4
3	John Eisele	United States	11:00.8
4	Guy Holdaway	Great Britain	(11:26.0)
5	Harry Sewell	Great Britain	unknown
6	William Galbraith	Canada	unknown

== Sources ==
- Cook, Theodore Andrea (1908). The Fourth Olympiad, Being the Official Report. London: British Olympic Association.
- De Wael, Herman (2001). "Athletics 1908". Herman's Full Olympians. Archived from the original on September 27, 2006.
- Wudarski, Pawel (1999). "Wyniki Igrzysk Olimpijskich" (in Polish).
