= Henry Barker (athlete) =

British athlete

Personal information
- Nationality: British (English)
- Born: 8 June 1871 Worsbrough, South Yorkshire, England
- Died: March 1944 (aged 72) Oldham, England

Sport
- Sport: Athletics
- Event: Middle-distance running
- Club: Salford Harriers

Henry Barker (8 June 1871 – March 1944) was a British middle-distance runner who competed at the 1908 Summer Olympics.

== Biography ==
Barker was born in Worsbrough, South Yorkshire and was a member of the Salford Harriers, where he became sub captain and in addition to athletics, won awards for swimming, wrestling, shooting and walking. He started racing in cross country and competed in the 1901 English National Cross Country Championships. Barker raced primarily over the one mile and steeplechase. He finished third behind Joseph English and Arthur Robertson in the steeplechase event at the 1907 AAA Championships.

Barker represented the Great Britain team at the 1908 Olympic Games in London, where he participated in the men's 3200 metres steeplechase competition. In his heat he was eliminated by Canadian William Galbraith after stopping with an injury.
