= Albert Wyatt =

British long-distance runner (1886–1950)

Personal information
- Nationality: British (English)
- Born: 23 October 1886 Radcliffe, Greater Manchester, England
- Died: July 1950 (aged 63) Salford, England

Sport
- Sport: Athletics
- Event: Long-distance running
- Club: Radcliffe Harriers

Albert Wyatt (23 October 1886 – July 1950) was a British long-distance runner who competed at the 1908 Summer Olympics.

== Biography ==
Wyatt was born in Radcliffe, Greater Manchester, England and was a member of the Radcliffe Harriers and by trade was a miner at Outwood Colliery. In 1904 he won his club's cross-country title and primarily continued racing cross country over the following three years which included winning the 1906 Radcliffe Harriers 7 miles championship in a record breaking time.

In 1908, he placed second in both the Northern Junior Cross-Country championships and the Olympic trial over 20 miles, he was beaten by Fred Lord in the trial.

Wyatt represented the Great Britain team at the 1908 Olympic Games in London, where he participated in the men's marathon competition. In the race held on 24 July, Wyatt failed to finish after dropping out.
