= Edward Cotter =

Edward Cotter may refer to:

- Edward Cotter (politician) (1902–1972), Irish Fianna Fáil politician
- Edward Cotter (athlete) (1887–1973), Canadian long-distance runner
- Ed Cotter (1904–1959), Major League Baseball player
- Edward M. Cotter (fireboat), a fireboat in use in Buffalo, New York
