= Bellars =

Bellars is a surname. It may refer to:

- Frederick Bellars (1888–1971), American track and field athlete and Olympian
- George Bellars (1848-?), New Zealand cricketer
- Stephanie Bellars (born 1976), known by her ring name Gorgeous George, American professional wrestling valet[1] and former exotic dancer

== See also ==
- Clara Bellar (born 1972), French actress, singer, film director, screenwriter and film producer
- Kirby Bellars, a village and civil parish near Melton Mowbray in Leicestershire, England
