= Billy Grantham =

British athlete

Personal information
- Nationality: British (English)
- Born: 19 October 1880 Wilmslow, Cheshire, England
- Died: 12 November 1942 (aged 62) Wilmslow, Cheshire, England

Sport
- Sport: Athletics
- Event: Middle-distance running/steeplechase
- Club: Salford Harriers

William Grantham (19 October 1880 – 12 November 1942) was a British middle-distance runner who competed at the 1908 Summer Olympics.

== Biography ==
Grantham was born in Wilmslow, Cheshire, England. He was a member of the Salford Harriers and won his first mile race in 1903 and won two handicap events in 1904, which included beating the leading runner at the time, Alf Shrubb. In January 1906 he won his first club medal and competed in the English National Cross Country Championships.

Grantham took up steeplechasing and finished third behind Reginald Noakes and Arthur Russell in the steeplechase event at the 1908 AAA Championships.

Grantham represented the Great Britain team at the 1908 Olympic Games in London, where he participated in the men's 3200 metres steeplechase competition. In his heat he failed to finish after stopping with an apparent injury.

Grantham lived in Alderley, Cheshire and by trade was a train driver with a local brickworks.
