= Paul Lagarde =

French pole vaulter

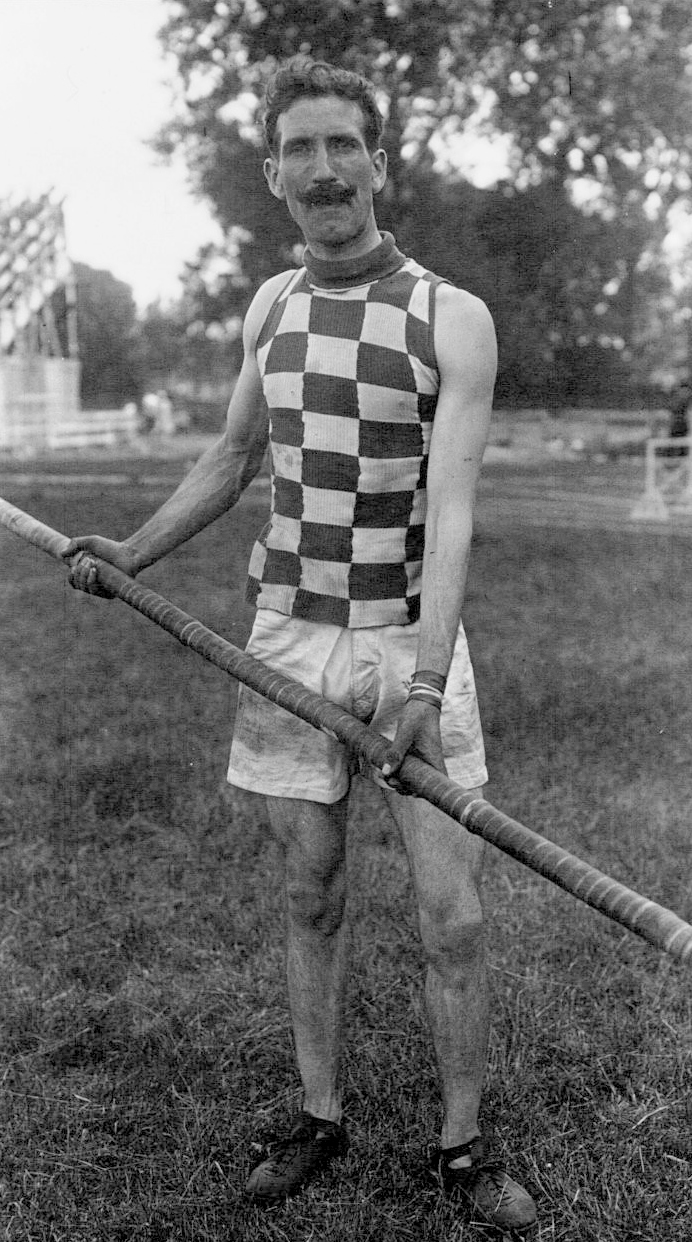
- Lagarde in 1921

Personal information
- Born: 15 April 1891 Bordeaux, France
- Died: 7 February 1964 (aged 72) Talence, France

Sport
- Sport: Athletics
- Event: Pole vault
- Club: CA Bèglais

Achievements and titles
- Personal best: 3.60 m – (1920)

Paul Lagarde (born 15 April 1891 - 7 February 1964) was a French pole vaulter, who competed at the Olympic Games.

== Biography ==
Lagarde finished second behind Kálmán Szathmáry in the pole jump event at the 1910 AAA Championships and repeated the feat the following year at the 1911 AAA Championships, when he finished second again, this time behind Robert Pasemann.

Lagarde competed at the 1920 Summer Olympics in the pole jump and finished 11th.
