= Thomas Jack (athlete) =

British track and field athlete

Personal information
- Born: 5 February 1881 Bellsquarry, Scotland
- Died: 9 October 1961 (aged 80) Edinburgh, Scotland

Sport
- Sport: Athletics
- Event: long-distance running
- Club: Edinburgh Southern Harriers

Thomas Jack (5 February 1881 – 9 October 1961) was a British track and field athlete. He competed at the 1908 Summer Olympics.

== Biography ==
Jack grew up on the family farm near the village of Bellsquarry and was educated at Edinburgh University. After winning the Scottish 10 miles title four times (1904, 1906, 1907, 1908), the Scottish 4 miles title in 1908 and the Scottish cross country championship in 1907 he was selected for Great Britain at the 1908 Summer Olympics. In 1908, he also finished third behind Alexander Duncan in the 10 miles event at the 1908 AAA Championships.

Jack represented Great Britain at the 1908 Summer Olympics in London. At the Games, he competed in the men's marathon event but failed to finish. Jack went on to win the Scottish 4 mile title once more in 1912 and the Scottish 10 miles title another three times (1909, 1910 and 1912). In 1912 he was the President of the Scottish AAA.

Jack would later become the Headmaster of Castle Hill School in Edinburgh.
