= Georg Lind =

Latvian long-distance runner

Personal information
- Nationality: British/Latvian
- Born: Georg Leepin (Juris Liepiņš); 1871 Courland, Latvia
- Died: 26 September 1957 (aged 85–86) Enfield, London, England
- Height: 177 cm (5 ft 10 in)

Sport
- Sport: Athletics
- Event: long-distance
- Club: Salford Harriers; Polytechnic Harriers

George Lind (born Juris Liepiņš (Georg Leepin) (1871 – 26 September 1957) was a Latvian-born British athlete. He competed at the 1908 Summer Olympics.

== Biography ==
Leepin was born in Courland, Latvia (part of the Russian Empire at the time) but as a young man moved to England in the early 1890s. He found work in Heywood, Greater Manchester as a cabinet maker and changed his name. He joined the Salford Harriers, helping them to third place at the 1895 English National Cross Country Championships, won by Birchfield Harriers.

Lind moved to London where he joined the Polytechnic Harriers. Lind represented the Russian Empire at the 1908 Olympic Games in London, where he participated in the men's marathon event. He finished in 19th place with a time of 3:26:38.

In September 1908, Lind took part in the 24 hour walk at White City Stadium. He suffered an injury in training during May 1909 that ended his career.

In 1912, Lind became a British citizen and during World War I (now in his forties) he was a timber inspector for the Ministry of Munitions. He remained in London, where he died on 26 September 1957.
