= Leone Pompucci =

Italian film director (born 1961)

- Born: 15 August 1961; Rome, Italy
- Occupations: Film director Screenwriter
- Years active: 1990 – present

Leone Pompucci (born 15 August 1961) is an Italian film director.

== Career ==
Leone Pompucci graduated from the Avogadro institute in Rome, followed by studies at the National Santa Cecilia Conservatory. He started his career as a photographer from 1982 to 1989. He conceived and produced covers for the most important Italian and European weekly magazines: Der Spiegel, L'Express, Panorama, L'espresso, L'Europeo and Famiglia Cristiana.

In the mid-1980s Leone Pompucci was recruited by the Italian TV program Rai 3, later working also with Rai 2 and Rai Uno. Equipped with that experience he made his first film, Mille bolle blu, for which he received the David di Donatello award for best young director in 1994. The film was also presented at the Stockholm Film Festival. His next film was released in 1995, again with success, winning a Nastro d'Argento for the best screenplay, written by Pompucci himself. The film's title was Camerieri. Within the RAI Leone Pompucci realized several productions, TV commercials and other services. In 2000 he completed his film Il grande botto. Then, the RAI entrusted him with the realization of twelve episodes of the successful TV series Don Matteo. In the 2000s (decade) he continued producing a large number of commercials for RAI while his career as director continued with the TV movie La fuga degli innocenti, for Rai Uno. In 2011 he completed his TV movie Il sogno del maratoneta which aired in 2012. This biographical film set around 1908 is based on the story of the Italian marathon runner Dorando Pietri.

== Filmography ==
=== Director ===
- Mille bolle blu (1993)
- Camerieri (1995)
- Il grande botto (2000)
- Don Matteo, (2000–2002) TV series, (12 episodes)
  - Scherzare col fuoco (2000)
  - Il torpedone (2001)
  - Il marchio sulla pelle (2001)
  - Cuore di ghiaccio (2001)
  - La mela avvelenata (2001)
  - Peso massimo (2001)
  - Un uomo onesto (2001)
  - Il morso del serpente (2001)
  - In amore non è mai troppo tardi (2002)
  - Il mistero del convento (2002)
  - Natalina innamorata (2002)
  - La lettera anonima (2002)
- La fuga degli innocenti (2004), TV movie
- Il sogno del maratoneta (2011), TV movie

=== Screenwriter ===
- Mille bolle blu (1993)
- Camerieri (1995)
- Il grande botto (2000)
- Il sogno del maratoneta (2011)

== Awards ==
- 1994: David di Donatello for best young director, (David di Donatello per il miglior regista esordiente), film Mille bolle blu
- 1996: Nastro d'argento for best screenplay, film Camerieri (to Leone Pompucci, Filippo Pichi and Paolo Rossi)
