= Michael Joseph Bulger =

Irish rugby player, athlete and medical doctor

Michael Bulger
- Born: Michael Joseph Bulger; 15 May 1867 Kilrush, Ireland
- Died: 20 July 1938 (aged 71) Holloway, Middx, England
- School: Blackrock College
- University: Trinity College, Dublin

Rugby union career
- Position: Threequarters
Senior career
Years	Team	Apps	(Points)
- Dublin University
–	Richmond hospital		
–	Lansdowne		
–	London Irish		
International career
Years	Team	Apps	(Points)
1888	Ireland	1	(0)

Michael Joseph Bulger (15 May 1867 – 20 July 1938) was an Irish rugby player, athlete and medical doctor. Along with his brothers, Daniel and Lawrence, he was prominent in the Irish sporting world in the late 19th century. Bulger achieved lasting fame for his role as one of the umpires involved in the disqualification of Dorando Pietri at the finish of the marathon at the 1908 London Olympics.

== Family background ==
The Bulger family were from Moore Street, Kilrush, County Clare, where their father, Daniel Scanlan Bulger (1831–1904), was a woolen merchant and draper and ran a loan office. Around 1880, the family moved to Dublin, where Daniel Scanlan Bulger became a member of the Dublin Stock Exchange and his sons were educated at Blackrock College and Trinity College Dublin.

== Rugby career ==
Bulger played rugby union while at Blackrock and from there, in a rugby career which his younger brother Lawrence would later follow, he represented Dublin University Football Club. It was while at Dublin University that Bulger was called up to play in his only international match, facing the first-ever New Zealand Native football team. Bulger was brought in at three quarters along with David Woods and Alfred Walpole, Walpole being the most experienced international with just a single cap. The game was lackluster for the main body of the match until the last third when the Natives took charge winning by four goals to one. After the loss, Bulger never played international rugby again, but this did not diminish his involvement in the game, as he represented Lansdowne Football Club while still a student. After completing his university education in Ireland, Bulger moved to London to set up a medical practice. A few years later Lawrence followed him to the capital, and the two brothers worked together in the same practice. In 1898 both brothers were founding members of London Irish.

== 1908 Olympic Marathon ==
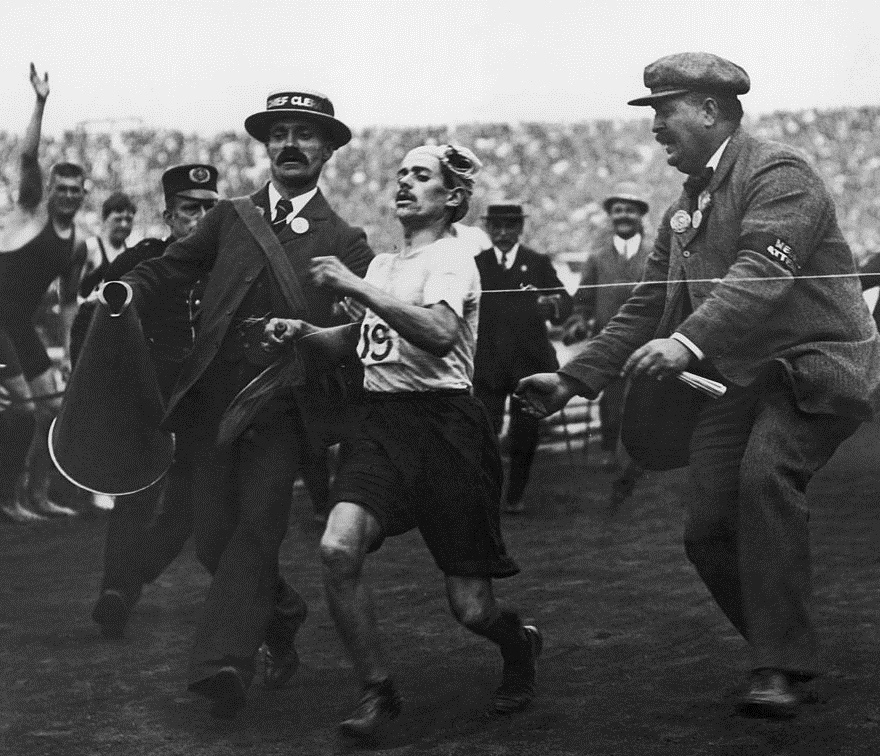
The arrival of Dorando Pietri at the finish of the 1908 Olympics marathon, assisted by Dr. Michael Joseph Bulger (right).

Dorando Pietri had trained hard for the 1908 Olympics in London. In a race in Carpi he ran 40 km (25 mi) in 2 hours and 38 minutes, an extraordinary result for the times. The marathon, which took place on 24 July 1908, started with 56 competitors, including Pietri and fellow Italian Umberto Blasi. It began at 2:33pm. The weather was particularly hot by British summer standards. The London course measured 26.2 miles (42.2 km); the distance would later become the official marathon length from 1921.

Pietri began his race at a rather slow pace, but in the second half of the course began a powerful surge moving him into second position by the 32 km (20 mi) mark, 4 minutes behind South African Charles Hefferon. When he knew that Hefferon was in crisis, Pietri further increased his pace, overtaking him at the 39 km (24 mi) mark.

The effort took its toll and with only two kilometres to go, Pietri began to feel the effects of extreme fatigue and dehydration. When he entered the stadium, he took the wrong path and when umpires, including Michael Joseph Bulger, redirected him, he fell down for the first time. He got up with their help, in front of 75,000 spectators.

He fell four more times, and each time the umpires helped him up. In the end, though totally exhausted, he managed to finish the race in first place. Of his total time of 2h 54min 46s, ten minutes were needed for that last 350 metres. Second was American Johnny Hayes, with a time of 2h 55min 18s. The American team immediately lodged a complaint against the help Pietri received from the umpires. The complaint was accepted and Pietri was disqualified and removed from the final standings of the race, but almost immediately became an international celebrity. The images, if not the names, of Bulger and the others who helped him across the line became equally well known.
