= Pasemann =

Pasemann is a surname. Notable people with the surname include:

- Frank Pasemann (born 1961), German politician
- Robert Pasemann (1886–1968), German track and field athlete
