= Alfred Healey =

British hurdler and sprinter

Personal information
- Born: 13 July 1879 Horncastle, England
- Died: 9 September 1960 (aged 81) Trinity, Jersey, Channel Islands

Sport
- Sport: Athletics
- Event: hurdles
- Club: Blackheath Harriers
Medal record
Representing Great Britain
Intercalated Games
Silver medal – second place	1906 Athens	110 metre hurdles

Alfred Hearn Healey (13 July 1879 – 9 September 1960) was a British athlete in the 1906 Intercalated Games and the 1908 Summer Olympics.

== Biography ==
Healey was the son of a Lincolnshire brewer and maltster and at the 1906 Intercalated Games, he competed for Great Britain in Athens, Greece, in the 110 metre hurdles, where he won the silver medal. He was eliminated in the semi-finals in the 100 metre event.

Healey finished second behind Alexander Duncan in the 120 yards hurdles event at the 1907 AAA Championships

Healey represented Great Britain at the 1908 Summer Olympics in London, where he was eliminated in the semi-finals of the 110 metre hurdles competition.

In 1909, he became the National 120 yards hurdles champion after winning the AAA Championships title at the 1909 AAA Championships.

Healey became a schoolteacher in Northumbria and later served as president of Alnwick Harriers AC and vice-president of the Alnwick Swimming Association. In 1912, he emigrated to Ceylon (modern day Sri Lanka) but died in Trinity, Jersey in the Channel Islands.
