= Richard York =

Richard York may refer to:

- Dick York (Richard York, 1928–1992), American actor
- Dicky York (Richard York, 1899–1969), English footballer

== See also ==
- Richard Yorke (1885–1914), British athlete
- Richard of York, 3rd Duke of York (1411–1460), English noble
- Richard of Shrewsbury, Duke of York (1473–1483), English prince
