= John Tait =

John Tait may refer to:

- John Tait (American football) (born 1975), professional football player
- John Tait (architect) (1787–1856), Scottish architect
- John Tait (entrepreneur) (1871–1955), Australian film and theatre entrepreneur
- John Tait (horseman) (1813–1888), Australian Thoroughbred racehorse owner/trainer in Australian Racing Hall of Fame
- John Tait (rugby union) (born 1973), Canadian rugby player
- John Tait (runner) (1888–1971), Olympic athlete
- John Guthrie Tait (1861–1945), Scottish educator and international rugby union player
- John W. Tait (born 1945), Egyptologist and Edwards Professor for the Institute of Archaeology at University College London
- John Barclay Tait (1900–1973), British hydrographist
- John Robinson Tait (1834–1909), American landscape painter, art critic, and travel writer
- John Tait (physiologist) (1878–1944), Scots-born professor of physiology at McGill University

== See also ==
- Jack Tait (disambiguation)
- John Tate (disambiguation)
