= Guy Holdaway =

British steeplechase runner

Personal information
- Nationality: British (English)
- Born: 28 February 1886 Belgravia, England
- Died: 1973 (aged 86–87) Newcastle, New South Wales, Australia

Sport
- Sport: Athletics
- Event: hurdles
- Club: Polytechnic Harriers

Charles Guy Holdaway (28 February 1886 – 1973) was a British athlete who competed at the 1908 Summer Olympics.

== Biography ==
Holdaway moved from Isledon Harriers to join Polytechnic Harriers. He finished fourth at the 1905 AAA Championships and then the following year improved to third behind Arthur Russell in the steeplechase event at the 1906 AAA Championships

Holdaway represented Great Britain at the 1908 Summer Olympics in London. In the first round of the 3200 metre steeplechase competition, Holdaway defeated countryman Joseph Kinchin and a pair of Americans, winning a chance to compete in the final. There, he started off quickly but fell to fourth place, finishing with a time of 11:26.0.

After the Olympics, Holdaway joined Aldershot Ecelsior Club and played for Aldershot Town F.C.. He later emigrated to Australia where he worked in a news agency and stationers business and played Aussie Rules.
