= Jack Tait =

Jack Tait may refer to:

- John Tait (athlete) (John Lindsay "Jack" Tait), Canadian athlete
- John Guthrie Tait (John "Jack" Guthrie Tait), Scottish educator

== See also ==
- Jack Tate (disambiguation)
- John Tait (disambiguation)
