= William Kolehmainen =

Finnish-American long-distance runner

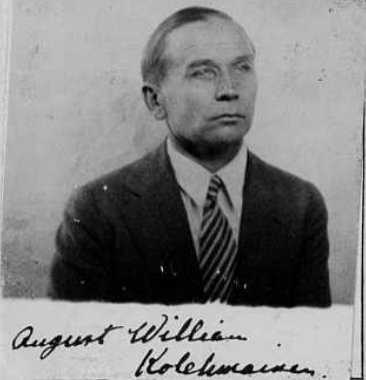
Kolehmainen in 1933

August William Kolehmainen (December 30, 1887 – June 26, 1967), known in Finland as Viljami Kolehmainen, was a Finnish-American long-distance runner and track and field coach. The brother of fellow runners Hannes and Tatu, William Kolehmainen moved to the United States in 1910 and became a professional runner there, setting a long-standing marathon world best in 1912.

== Biography ==
Kolehmainen was born in Kuopio on December 30, 1887. His older brother Tatu and younger brothers Hannes and Kalle were all also distance runners; William Kolehmainen started as a cross-country skier, and first competed in running in 1907. At the time, the sport was only starting to pick up in Finland, and the brothers, together with Kalle Nieminen and Albin Stenroos, were among the pioneers of Finnish distance running.

In 1910 William Kolehmainen moved to the United States, where he acquainted himself with American training methods and received coaching from Lawson Robertson of the Irish American Athletic Club. In turn, he sent tips and training programs to his brothers in Finland. In 1911 he ran 10,000 metres in 31:19.0 while visiting Finland; the time would have broken Hannes Kolehmainen's Finnish record by almost a minute, but as William had already become a professional runner, his times were not eligible under amateur rules.

Kolehmainen competed on the professional running circuits of the United States and Scotland for the following years. He broke the marathon world best in Vailsburg on October 20, 1912. Kolehmainen had earlier beaten Hans Holmer, who held the previous world best of 2:32:21.8, in a close race at the Powderhall Marathon in Edinburgh; in Vailsburg, the two met again and ran together for much of the way, but Kolehmainen dropped Holmer after the 20 mile mark. In the end, Kolehmainen won by more than five minutes, and his time of 2:29:39.2 was a new world record; his split at 25 miles, 2:22:20.6, was also a world best. Although his times were not accepted as records by the International Amateur Athletic Federation due to his professional status, they remained world bests for a long time; the first faster marathon recognized by the Association of Road Racing Statisticians was run by Sohn Kee-chung in 1935, although the IAAF also recognizes Albert Michelsen's time of 2:29:01.8 from 1925. William Kolehmainen and his younger brother Hannes held marathon world bests simultaneously, on the professional and amateur sides of the sport respectively.

Kolehmainen remained active as a coach for many years, guiding American and Finnish-American athletes in New York City. In addition to his brothers, his pupils included Ville Ritola and Juho Tuomikoski. He died in Boynton Beach, Florida on June 26, 1967.
