= Roland Spitzer =

American middle-distance runner

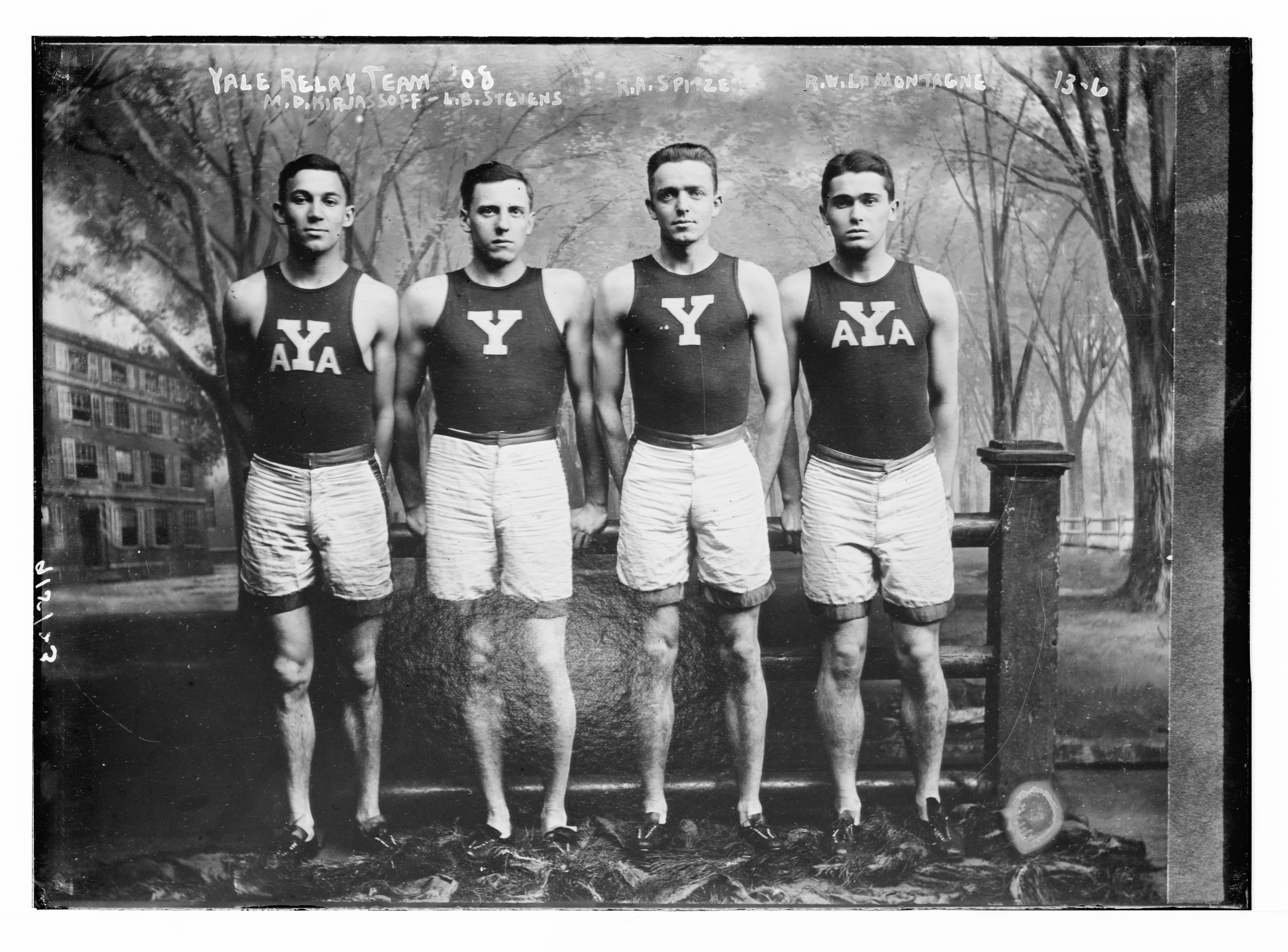
- Spitzer, second from right

Personal information
- Full name: Roland Adelbert Spitzer
- Nationality: American
- Born: September 21, 1885
- Died: May 20, 1916 (aged 30)

Sport
- Sport: Middle-distance running
- Event: Steeplechase

Roland Adelbert Spitzer (September 21, 1885 – May 20, 1916) was an American middle-distance runner. He competed in the men's 3200 metres steeplechase at the 1908 Summer Olympics. Spitzer was the son of A.L. Spitzer, a millionaire from Toledo, Ohio. He attended Yale University where he achieved prominence as a runner and served as captain of the cross-country team. He was a member of the United States Olympic team in 1908 and graduated from Yale in 1909. He then served as the treasurer of the Spitzer Building Company. He developed a "stomach ailment" for which he sought treatment by the Mayo Brothers in Rochester, Minnesota. He died in 1916 at age 31.
