= 1911 AAA Championships =

Outdoor track and field competition

- Dates: 1 July 1911
- Host city: London, England
- Venue: Stamford Bridge (stadium)
- Level: Senior
- Type: Outdoor
- Events: 16

The 1911 AAA Championships was the 1911 edition of the annual outdoor track and field competition organised by the Amateur Athletic Association (AAA). It was held on Saturday 1 July 1911 at the Stamford Bridge (stadium) in London, England. The attendance was 12,000.

The Championships consisted of 16 events.

== Results ==
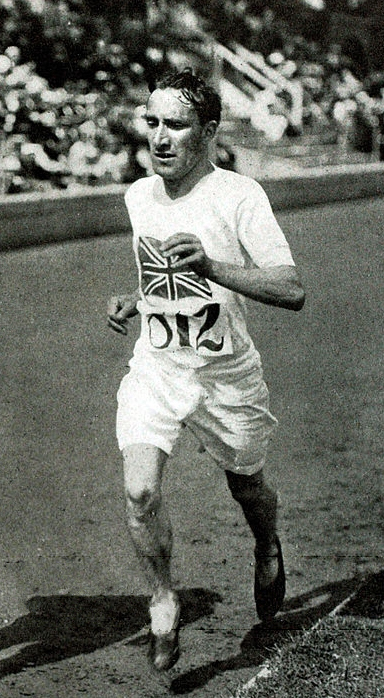
William Scott

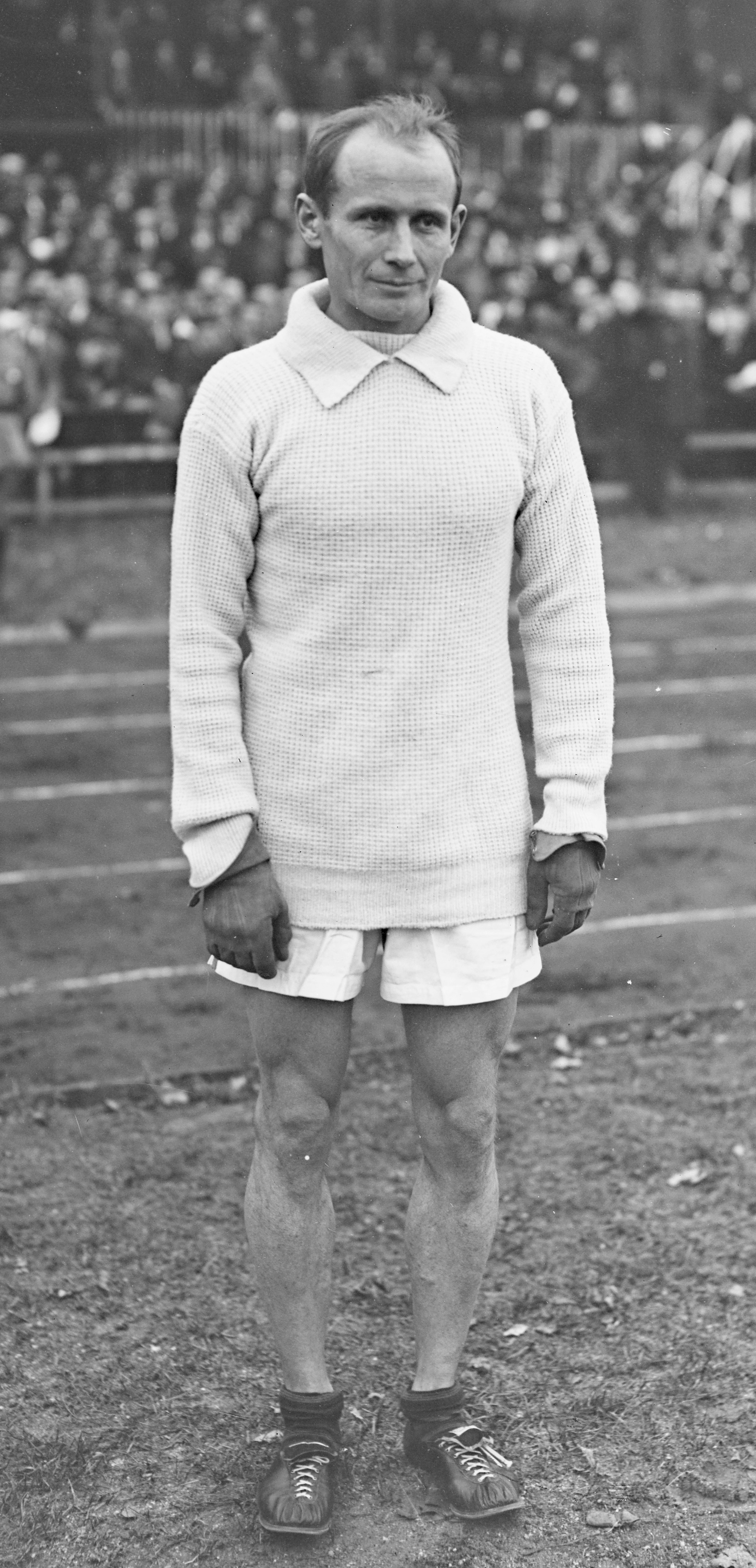
Hannes Kolehmainen

Event	Gold		Silver		Bronze	
100 yards	(United States) Frederick L. Ramsdell	10.4	Victor d'Arcy	½ yd	(Australia) William Stewart	1 yd
220 yards	(United States) Frederick L. Ramsdell	22.2	(Canada) Frank Halbhaus	2 yd	(Germany) Richard Rau	2 yd
440 yards	(Canada) Frank Halbhaus	50.8	William Tettenhall	6-8 yd	T.E. Adams	1 ft - 1 yd
880 yards	(Germany) Hanns Braun	1:59.8	(Australia) Gregory Wheatley	4-5 yd	(Canada) Mel Brock	2 yd
1 mile	(Scotland) Douglas McNicol	4:22.2	(Canada) John Tait	2 yd	Eddie Owen	1 yd
4 miles	(Finland) Hannes Kolehmainen	20:03.6	William Scott	20:04.0	Amos Martin	20:26.4
10 miles	William Scott	52:26.4	Arthur Smith	54:16.4	Ernest Massey	54:46.2
steeplechase	Reginald Noakes	11:10.6	Arthur Pateshall	80-100 yd	(France) Paul Lizandier	100 yd
120yd hurdles	Percy Phillips	16.2	Kenneth Powell	inches	(France) Maurice Meunier	inches
2 miles walk	Harold Ross	13:55.4	Will Ovens		William Yates	
7 miles walk	George Larner	52:08.0	William Yates	52:24.4	Harold Ross	52:45.2
high jump	(Germany) Robert Pasemann	1.829	(Leinster) Tom Leahy	1.803	Benjamin Howard Baker	1.753
pole jump	(Germany) Robert Pasemann	3.66	(France) Paul Lagarde	3.53	(France) Maurice Garon	3.32
long jump	(Leinster) Percy Kirwan	7.15	(Germany) Robert Pasemann	7.10	Sidney Abrahams	7.01
shot put	(Leinster) John Barrett	13.23	(France) André Tison	13.23	(Germany) Alex Abraham	11.66
hammer throw	(United States) George Putnam	45.00	Alf Flaxman	38.12	(Scotland) Duncan Porteous	33.00
