= 1907 AAA Championships =

Outdoor track and field competition

- Dates: 6 July 1907
- Host city: Manchester, England
- Venue: Fallowfield Stadium
- Level: Senior
- Type: Outdoor
- Events: 16

The 1907 AAA Championships was the 1907 edition of the annual outdoor track and field competition organised by the Amateur Athletic Association (AAA). It was held on Saturday 6 July 1907 at the Fallowfield Stadium in Manchester, England in front of 5–7,000 spectators.

The Championships consisted of 16 events.

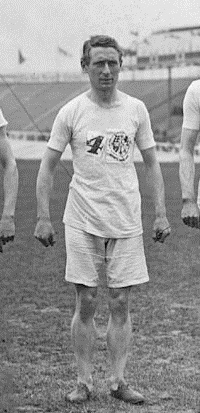
Joe Deaking finished runner-up in both the 1 mile and 4 miles events

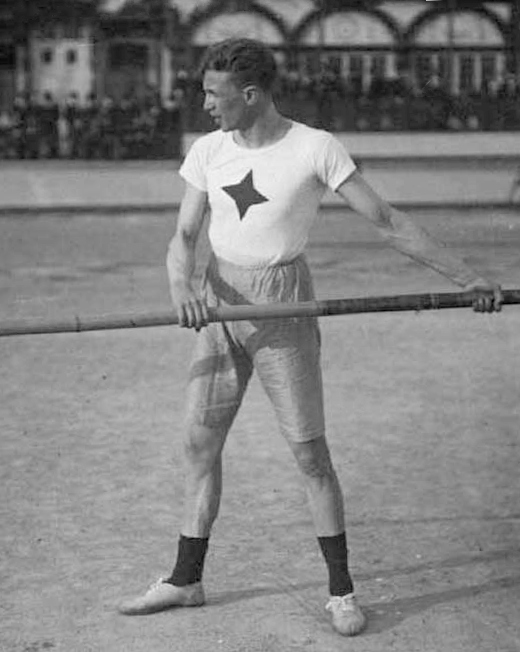
Swede Bruno Söderström won the pole jump

== Results ==
Event	Gold		Silver		Bronze	
100 yards	John Morton	10.8	(United States) Nathaniel Cartmell	1 ft	(Leinster) Denis Murray	½ yd
220 yards	John George	22.8	John Morton	1 yd	(United States) Nathaniel Cartmell USA	½ yd
440 yards	Edwin Montague	52.6	Charles Stanfield	2-3½ yd	Charles Davies	4 yd
880 yards	Ivo Fairbairn-Crawford	1:59.6	(Sweden) Kristian Hellström	2 yd	Arthur Astley	6 yd
1 mile	George Butterfield	4:22.4	Joe Deakin	4:23.0	Jack Lee	1 ft
4 miles	(Scotland) Alexander Duncan	19:51.4	Joe Deakin	19:54.4	A. W. Shee	20:00.0
10 miles	Adam Underwood	54:03.0	(Scotland) Alexander Duncan	54:06.0	Tommy Clarke	54:06.8
steeplechase	Joseph English	11:21.2	(Scotland) Arthur Robertson	25-40 yd	Henry Barker	4 yd
120yd hurdles	Oswald Groenings	16.8	Alfred Healey	1 yd	(Scotland) Robert Stronach	
2 miles walk	Ralph Harrison	14:01.8	Johnny Johnson	14:10.4	William Yates	14:24.2
7 miles walk	Frederick Thompson	52:46.6	C. Trippier	52:50.0	J. W. E. Bennett	53:00.0
high jump	(Leinster) Con Leahy	1.829	Frederick Birkett	1.791	only 2 competitors	
pole jump	(Sweden) Bruno Söderström	3.20	R. Parrington	2.59	only 2 competitors	
long jump	(Leinster) Denis Murray	6.70	Lionel Cornish	6.65	Oswald Groenings	6.60
shot put	(Scotland) Tom Kirkwood	13.46	(Scotland) Tom Nicolson	12.47	Henry Alan Leeke	11.29
hammer throw	(Scotland) Tom Nicolson	48.38	(Leinster) John Murray	43.06	Henry Alan Leeke	38.46
