= James Murphy (runner) =

Irish athlete

Personal information
- Nationality: Irish
- Born: 23 February 1880 Lissyconor, Galway, Ireland
- Died: 18 July 1962 (aged 82) Reading, England

Sport
- Sport: Athletics
- Event: long-distance
- Club: Vulcan Cycling Club, Edinburgh; Hallamshire Harriers

James Murphy (23 February 1880 – 18 July 1962) was an Irish track and field athlete who competed at the 1908 Summer Olympics.

== Biography ==
Murphy born Galway, Ireland, was living in England by 1908 and performed well in the 1908 English National Cross Country Championships in March, for his club Hallamshire Harriers. He then won the 1908 Irish AAA 4 miles title, qualifying him for the London Olympic Games.

Murphy represented the Great Britain team at the 1908 Olympic Games, where he competed in the men's 5 miles competition. He won his heat to qualify for the Olympic Final but despite leading the final at one stage he dropped out and failed to finish.

After the Olympics, Murphy won the Northern Counties cross country title and became English cross country champion, after winning the English National Cross Country Championships at Haydock in 1909, when running for Hallamshire Harriers.

From 1907 until 1912, Murphy represented Ireland five times in the International Cross-Country championships.

Murphy worked and lived in England and by trade was a colliery worker at the Kinsley Park Colliery in Yorkshire, although in later life he did become a pub landlord. From 1932 until 1936 was president of the Yorkshire Deputies Association.
