= Kalle Nieminen =

Finnish long-distance runner

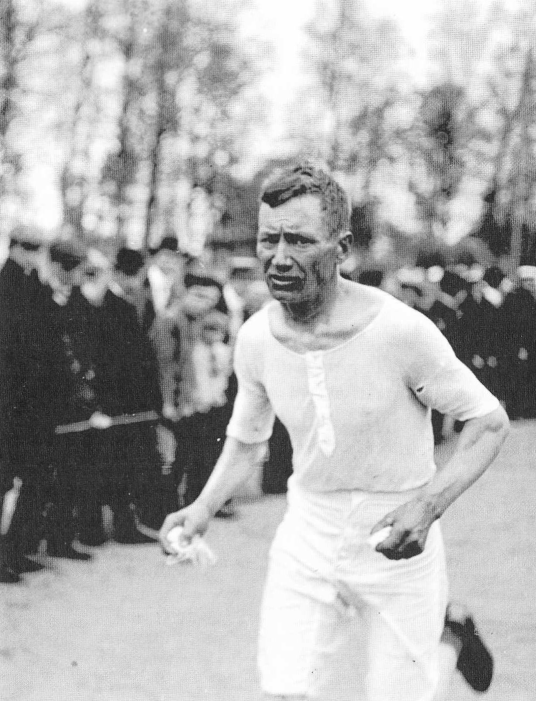
- Kalle Nieminen in 1909

Personal information
- Full name: Karl Maurits Nieminen
- Nicknames: Kaarlo, Kalle
- National team: Finland
- Born: 26 April 1878 Asikkala, Grand Duchy of Finland, Russian Empire
- Died: 22 August 1943 (aged 65) United States
- Occupations: Long distance runner and coach, stonemason, masseur, fox farmer
- Years active: 1903–1910s
- Height: 171 cm (5 ft 7 in)
- Weight: 70 kg (154 lb)
- Spouse: Maria Bäck

Sport
- Sport: Athletics
- Event: Long-distance running
- Club: Helsingin Koitto (1903–1905); Helsingin Reipas (1905–1908); Helsingin Jyry (1908–1909)
- Turned pro: 1910

Achievements and titles
- Personal best: Marathon: 2:43:10 (1912)

Karl Maurits "Kalle" Nieminen (26 April 1878 – 22 August 1943) was a Finnish long-distance runner, who competed in the 1908 Summer Olympics.

== Biography ==
He was born in Asikkala, Grand Duchy of Finland, Russian Empire, the eighth child of Kalle (1835–1911) and Vilhelmiina Nieminen (1842–1918) in Venäjänniemi, Asikkala in 1878. He moved to Helsinki at the age of 21, where he worked as a stonemason.

He participated in his first race in 1903 when the longest ones held were middle-distance events. He became that year a member of the club Helsingin Koitto.

On 9 July 1905, he won a 10,000 metre race with a Finnish record time of 37:44.6. Soon he changed to the club Helsingin Reipas. On 16 September 1906, he won the first marathon race held in Finland.

In September 1907, he had his first races abroad. In Stockholm, he tied the Finnish one hour run record with 16,759 meters, but at the time, only races in Finland counted towards the record.

In 1908, he changed clubs to Helsingin Jyry, where he also coached junior athletes. In May, he won the Olympic selection marathon race and represented Finland at the 1908 Olympic marathon, where he finished tenth with a time of 3:09:50.8.

He ran his last race in Finland in August 1909, after which he emigrated to the United States to compete professionally.

His first professional race was in Philadelphia on 28 March 1910, when he won a two-man tag team relay marathon with William Kolehmainen.

His marathon personal best was 2:43:10.0, which he ran in the Vailsburg Motordrome in Vailsburg, Newark in 20 October 1912.

After retirement, he coached long-distance runners in Columbia University. He also earned a living as a masseur and a fox farmer.

He made his last contact with his native Finland in the early 1920s when he visited his sister's family in Asikkala. He died at the age of 65 in the United States in 1943. The news was not transmitted to anyone in Finland, where he was declared dead in absentia in 1971.
