= Charles Stanfield =

Austria international footballer (1884–1941)

Personal information
- Date of birth: 13 December 1884
- Place of birth: Sheffield, England
- Date of death: 1941 (aged 56–57)
- Place of death: Cambridge, England
- Position: Forward

International career
Years	Team	Apps	(Gls)
1904–1905	Austria	2	(4)

Charles Stanfield (13 December 1884 – 1941) was an athlete and footballer. Born in England, he played in two matches for the Austria national team from 1904 to 1905, scoring four goals.

== Biography ==
Stanfield was primarily an athlete and competed for the Herne Hill Harriers. In 1904, he took a up a work appointment in Vienna, Austria, and while there he broke the Austrian 100 yards record.

He was also an excellent footballer and played for Nunhead F.C., Bury F.C. and Civil Service F.C.. While in Austria he played for Vienna Cricket and Football-Club and was capped twice for the Austria national team. His brothers Ernest and Harry both played for Nunhead.

On his return from Austria he continued to race and would later finish second behind Edwin Montague in the 440 yards event at the 1907 AAA Championships.
