= Jack Tate =

Jack Tate may refer to:

- Jack Tate, who portrays Jack in the Box mascot, Jack Box
- Jack Tate (actor) in Warriors of Virtue
- Jack Tate Center for Entrepreneurship
- Jack Tate (politician), a Member of the Colorado State Senate

== See also ==
- Jack Tait (disambiguation)
- John Tate (disambiguation)
