= Josh Smith (runner) =

British runner (1877–1954)

Personal information
- Nationality: British (English)
- Born: 5 October 1877 Bradford, England
- Died: 28 February 1954 (aged 76) Bradford, England

Sport
- Sport: Athletics
- Event: middle-distance
- Club: Bradford AC; Salford Harriers

Joshua Murgatroyd Smith (5 October 1877 – 28 February 1954) was a British track and field athlete who competed at the 1908 Summer Olympics.

== Biography ==
As a member of the upper class, he attended University of Cambridge, with ambitions to move to Liverpool. He only spent one year in college before dropping out and residing right outside the city of Cambridge, where he became interested in running.

Smith finished second behind Alfred Shrubb in the 4 miles event at the 1904 AAA Championships. The following year Smith was running for Salford Harriers and became the British 4 miles champion after winning the British AAA Championships title at the 1905 AAA Championships.

Smith represented Great Britain at the 1908 Summer Olympics in London. In the 1500 metres, Smith placed fifth in his initial semifinal heat and did not advance to the final.
