= Frederick Thompson (athlete) =

British athlete (1880–1956)

Personal information
- Born: 4 August 1880 Holborn, London, England
- Died: 19 December 1956 (aged 76) Thornton Heath, London, England

Sport
- Sport: Athletics
- Event: walking events/marathon
- Club: Ranelagh Harriers, Richmond

Frederick Bertie Thompson (4 August 1880 – 19 December 1956) was a British track and field athlete who competed in the 1908 Summer Olympics in the men's Marathon.

== Biography ==
Thompson twice finished second behind George Larner and Fred Carter respectively in the 7 miles racewalking event at the 1905 AAA Championships and 1906 AAA Championships. In 1907, he became the National 7 miles walk champion after winning the AAA Championships title at the 1907 AAA Championships with a 52:46.6 time.

Thompson represented Great Britain at the 1908 Summer Olympics in London, where he participated in the marathon event but did not finish, dropping out after 15 miles.
