= Fred Buckley =

British middle-distance runner

Personal information
- Nationality: Irish
- Born: 22 November 1883 Dublin, Ireland
- Died: 9 July 1965 (aged 81) Dublin, Ireland

Sport
- Sport: Middle-distance running
- Event: Steeplechase
- Club: Haddington Harriers, Dublin

Frederick James Buckley (22 November 1883 – 9 July 1965) was an Irish middle-distance runner who competed at the 1908 Summer Olympics.

== Biography ==
Buckley ran for Haddington Harriers of Dublin and was a cross-county runner, representing Ireland from 1907 to 1910 in the International Championship. He won the Irish steeplechase championship in 1908, which led to his selection for the Olympic Games.

Buckley represented Great Britain at the 1908 Summer Olympics in London. He competed in the men's 3200 metres steeplechase event.
