= Il sogno del maratoneta =

- Written by: Roberto Jannone; Grazia Giardiello; Gualtiero Rosella; Pietro Calderoni
- Directed by: Leone Pompucci
- Starring: Luigi Lo Cascio; Laura Chiatti; Alessandro Haber; Fabio Fulco; Andy Luotto
- Music by: Carlo Crivelli
- Country of origin: Italy
- Original language: Italian

Production
- Producer: Luca Barbareschi
- Cinematography: Marco Pieroni
- Editor: Osvaldo Bargero
- Running time: 200 min

Original release
- Release: March 18, 2012

Il sogno del maratoneta (English: The Dream of the Marathon Runner) is an Italian TV movie produced by RAI television. It is directed by Leone Pompucci and stars Luigi Lo Cascio and Laura Chiatti. It was aired on television as a two-parter. It is an adaptation of the similarly titled book by Giuseppe Pederiali.

It has been presented at the 26th Festival international de programmes audiovisuels (FIPA) in Biarritz (France) on 25 and 26 January 2013 in the selections Fiction and Compétition.

== Plot ==
The movie is about the story of the Italian athlete Dorando Pietri and recounts the runner's fortunes and misfortunes at the 1908 Summer Olympics in London.

The start of Pietri's sporting career was a hard one. A passionate long-distance runner, like his brother Ulpiano, Dorando Pietri was rebuffed by trainer Barbisio because he was deemed to be too meager. Still, Pietri takes part in the marathon race at Carpi, his home town, and finishes first, ahead of Pericle Rondinella, the star runner of Barbisio's team. The day later though Rondinella was to beat Pietri in another race. Ottavio, an old but experienced trainer, was following both races and, recognizing Pietri's potential, he hires him to train for the Italian championships. Thanks to Ottavio's guidance Pietri soon becomes Italian champion and is selected to represent his country at the marathon event during the Games of the IV Olympiad, in 1908.

On the D-day, Pietri runs a perfect marathon and is far ahead of his followers. But as he enters the London stadium to run the few remaining yards he is distracted and takes the wrong turn, gets disoriented, staggers and falls, gets up and falls again. The crowd cheers to encourage him standing up, and the referees too encourage him wholeheartedly. Pietri seems just exhausted. But as he sees his competitor, the American Johnny Hayes, entering the stadium, he gathers his very last forces, stands up, runs and collapses right after passing the finish line.

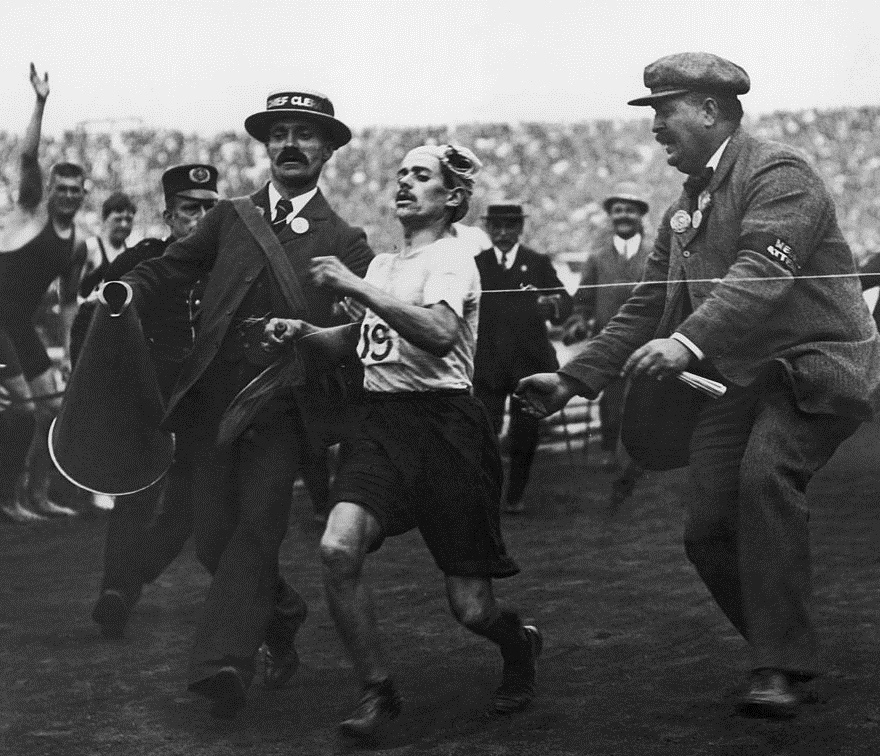
Depiction of Dorando Pietri staggering across the finish line of the 1908 Olympic marathon

The spectators and family who are following the scene are split in mixed feelings between joy and concerns for Pietri's condition. Will he survive, or was it too much? And then the good news comes: Pietri is safe and sound. But his hour of glory is short. The Americans lodge a complaint arguing that Pietri was supported to stand up. The victory is then assigned to Hayes. Moved by this misfortune, and to express the British people's admiration for him, Queen Alexandra presents to Pietri a cup filled with pounds exactly identical to the one presented to the winner. But can that really be a substitute for a denied victory?

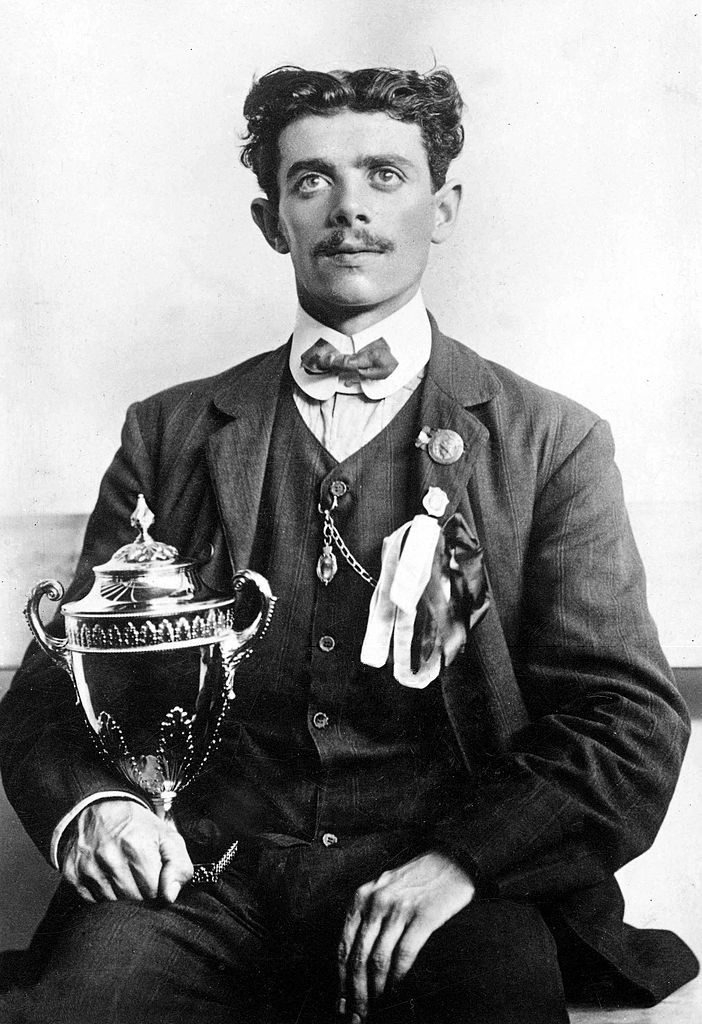
Dorando Pietri.

== Cast ==
- Luigi Lo Cascio as Dorando Pietri
- Laura Chiatti as Luciana
- Dajana Roncione as Teresa Bulgarelli
- Alessandro Haber as Ottavio Bulgarelli
- Thomas Trabacchi as Ulpiano Pietri
- Fabio Fulco as Pericle Rondinella
- Gerardo Mastrodomenico as Dongo
- Pippo Delbono as Artemisio Barbisio
- Andy Luotto as Johnny Grieco
