= John Tate =

John Tate may refer to:

- John Tate (mathematician) (1925–2019), American mathematician
- John Torrence Tate Sr. (1889–1950), American physicist
- John Percival Tate (1895–1977), Australian politician
- John Tate (actor) (1915–1979), Australian actor
- John Stuart Tate, Australian politician
- John Tate (boxer) (1955–1998), World Heavyweight Champion
- John Tate (Lord Mayor of London, 1473) (died 1479), Lord Mayor of London
- John Tate (papermaker) (died 1507/8), English paper maker
- John Tate (Lord Mayor of London) (died 1515), Lord Mayor, 1496 and 1514
- John Tate (footballer) (1892–1973), English footballer
- John Tate, Laurie Strode's son in Halloween H20: Twenty Years Later
- John Tate, a character in The Faculty

== See also ==
- Jack Tate (disambiguation)
- John Tait (disambiguation)
