= Edward Carr (athlete) =

American long-distance runner

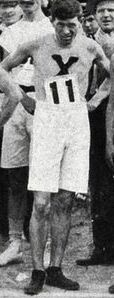
- Carr in 1904 Olympics

Personal information
- Full name: Edward Powell Carr
- Born: February 27, 1878 Brooklyn, New York, U.S.
- Died: March 16, 1947 (aged 69) Bayville, New York, U.S.
- Height: 5 ft 6 in (168 cm)
- Weight: 130 lb (59 kg)

Sport
- Sport: Long-distance running
- Events: Marathon, steeplechase
- Club: Xavier Athletic Association

Edward Powell Carr (February 27, 1878 – March 16, 1947) was an American long-distance runner. He competed in the men's marathon at the 1904 Summer Olympics and the men's 5 miles and Men's 3200 metres steeplechase events at the 1908 Summer Olympics.
