= Victor Aitken =

Australian long-distance runner (1887–1962)

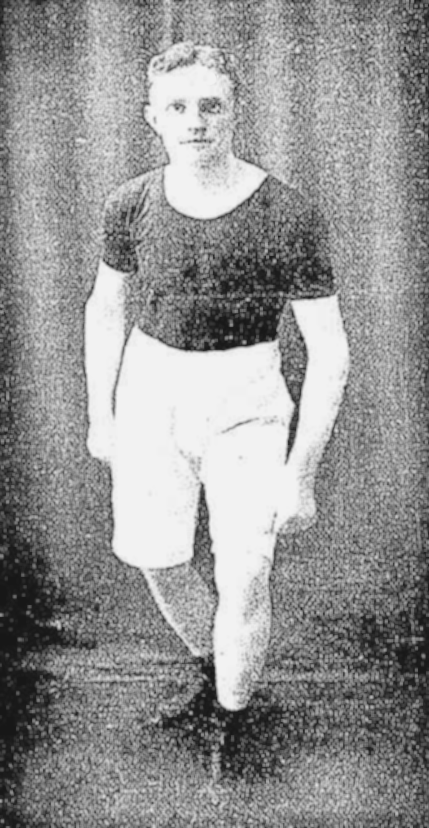
- Victor Aitken, 1909.

Personal information
- Nationality: Australian
- Born: 23 May 1887 Coburg, Victoria, Australia
- Died: 31 October 1962 (aged 75) Surrey Hills, Victoria, Australia

Sport
- Sport: Long-distance running
- Event: Marathon

Victor Aitken (23 May 1887 – 31 October 1962) was an Australian long-distance runner. He competed in the men's marathon at the 1908 Summer Olympics.

== Career ==
In 1905, he placed second in the one-mile walking championship of Victoria and he also came second in the 1907 5-mile cross country championship of Victoria held at Ballarat. He then came first in the 7-mile open handicap at Heidelberg and the 10-mile cross country championship of Victoria held at the Caulfield Racecourse and beyond, breaking the race record by completing it in 59 minutes and 5 seconds.

In 1908, Aitken was selected as a Marathon representative for the Olympic Games in London and he ran twenty-two and a half miles before retiring due to "sleepiness". A week after arriving home from the Olympics he came sixth in the Victorian 10-mile cross country championship in 61 minutes and 27 seconds, a minute behind the race winner, Charles Suffren of the Ballarat Harriers club. In 1909 he achieved record times in his three and five-mile club races and he broke his own record in the 10-mile cross country championship of Victoria by 19 seconds. Three weeks later on 9 October 1909 Aitken competed in the Victorian Marathon Championship, where he finished fourth overall, and second Victorian to finish in a time of 3 hours, 13 minutes and 52 seconds, which was 8 minutes and 10 seconds behind the Victorian gold medallist, A. "Mack" Connor of Geelong Guild.
