= Thomas Downing (athlete) =

Irish athlete

Tom Downing
Personal information
- Nationality: Irish
- Born: 21 January 1883 Carlow, County Carlow, Ireland
- Died: 18 October 1943 (aged 60) Dublin, Ireland

Sport
- Sport: Athletics
- Event: Cross country/steeplechase
- Club: Haddington Harriers, Dublin

Thomas Downing (21 January 1883 – 18 October 1943) was an Irish middle-distance runner who competed at the 1908 Summer Olympics.

== Biography ==
Downing was born in Carlow, County Carlow, Ireland. He competed in the 1906 English National Cross Country Championships at Colwall and was the 1907 Irish Cross Country champion, also helping his Haddington team to the senior team title.

After taking part in the 1908 Irish Cross-Country Championships, Downing represented the Great Britain team at the 1908 Olympic Games in London, where he participated in the men's 3200 metres steeplechase competition. In his heat he was disqualified for incorrectly clearing the first water jump.

From 1904 to 1910, Downing took part in the International Cross-Country Championship five times.
