= Julius Jørgensen =

Danish long-distance runner

Personal information
- Nationality: Danish
- Born: 20 June 1880 Copenhagen
- Died: 3 October 1937 (aged 57) Copenhagen

Sport
- Sport: Long-distance running
- Event: Marathon

Ferdinand Julius Jørgensen (20 June 1880 – 3 October 1937) was a Danish long-distance runner. He competed in the men's marathon at the 1908 Summer Olympics.

Jørgensen was born in Copenhagen and was a member of AIK 95 there. In 1905 he won the inaugural Kongepokalen, then a 15 km race; it has since become the Danish national championship in men's cross country running.

At the 1908 Summer Olympics in London, he was one of two Danes competing in the marathon, placing 23rd. He was eliminated in the men's 5-mile race.
