= Arthur Burn =

Canadian long-distance runner

Personal information
- Full name: Arthur James Burn
- Born: 1 June 1879 Calgary, Northwest Territories, Canada
- Died: 28 December 1911 (aged 32)

Sport
- Sport: Long-distance running
- Event: Marathon

Arthur James Burn (1 June 1879 – 28 December 1911) was a Canadian long-distance runner. He competed in the men's marathon at the 1908 Summer Olympics. He died in December 1911, at the age of 35.
