= George Lister =

Canadian long-distance runner

Personal information
- Born: 6 November 1886 Perth, Ontario, Canada
- Died: 1 May 1973 (aged 86) Toronto, Ontario, Canada

Sport
- Sport: Long-distance running
- Event: Marathon

George Andrew Lister (6 November 1886 – 1 May 1973) was a Canadian long-distance runner. He competed in the men's marathon at the 1908 Summer Olympics.
