= Joseph Kinchin =

British athlete (1884–1969)

Joe Kinchin
Personal information
- Nationality: British (English)
- Born: 11 June 1884 Kings Norton, Birmingham, England
- Died: 23 December 1969 (aged 85) Chadwick End, Warwickshire, England

Sport
- Sport: Athletics
- Event: Middle-distance running/steeplechase
- Club: Sparkhill Harriers

Joseph William Kinchin (11 June 1884 – 23 December 1969) was a British middle-distance runner who competed at the 1908 Summer Olympics.

== Biography ==
Kinchin was born in Kings Norton, Birmingham, England and was a member of the Sparkhill Harriers, where he later became the club captain.

In 1907 Kinchin helped the Sparkhill Harriers take second place at the Midland Counties Junior Cross-Country Championship at Derby and finished 5th in the steeplechase event at the 1908 AAA Championships.

Kinchin represented the Great Britain team at the 1908 Olympic Games in London, where he participated in the men's 3200 metres steeplechase competition. In his heat he finished a creditable second place behind Guy Holdaway but with only the heat winner qualifying he missed out on the Olympic final.

After the Olympic Games, Kinchin raced primarily over the 880 yards and one mile distances. By trade he was a garage proprietor in Solihull. One of his employees Bill Humphries was encouraged by Kinchin to join the Sparkhill Harriers and became a notable local athlete.
