= William Yates (athlete) =

British racewalker

Personal information
- Nationality: British
- Born: 16 April 1883 Congleton, England
- Died: 27 December 1967 (aged 87) Macclesfield, England

Sport
- Sport: Athletics
- Event: Racewalking
- Club: Salford Harriers

Achievements and titles
- Personal bests: 2 mile walk: 13:38.4 (1911) 10 km walk: 49:42.6 (1912) 7 mile walk: 52:02.8 (1911)

William George Yates (5 August 1880 – 27 December 1967) was a British racewalker who competed at the 1912 Summer Olympics.

== Biography ==
Yates finished third behind Richard Harrison in the 7 miles walk event at the 1907 AAA Championships.

Yates finished second behind George Larner in the 7 miles walk event and third in the 2 miles walk at the 1911 AAA Championships and the following year in 1912, he finished second behind Bobby Bridge in the 7 mile walk event at the 1912 AAA Championships.

Shortly after the 1912 AAA Championships, Yates competed in the 10 km walk at the 1912 Summer Olympics in Stockholm, Sweden.
