= Kjeld Nielsen =

Danish athlete

Kjeld Nielsen (July 26, 1887 – February 14, 1910) was a Danish athlete. He competed in the 1908 Summer Olympics in London. In the 1500 metres event, Nielsen placed sixth in his initial semifinal heat and did not advance to the final. He also participated in the 5 miles race but was again eliminated in the first round.

== Sources ==
- Cook, Theodore Andrea (1908). The Fourth Olympiad, Being the Official Report. London: British Olympic Association.
- De Wael, Herman (2001). "Athletics 1908". Herman's Full Olympians. Archived from the original on 27 September 2006.
- Wudarski, Pawel (1999). "Wyniki Igrzysk Olimpijskich" (in Polish).
- Kjeld Nielsen at World Athletics
- Kjeld Nielsen at Olympics.com
- Kjeld Nielsen at Olympedia
