= William Goldsboro =

Canadian marathon runner

William Bertrand Goldsboro (August 30, 1884 – May 1, 1937) was a track and field athlete who competed in the 1908 Summer Olympics for Canada. He finished 16th in the Men's Marathon. He was affiliated with Central YMCA in Toronto.
