= Alton Welton =

American marathon runner

Alton Roy Welton (March 11, 1886 – November 9, 1958) was an American track and field athlete who competed in the 1908 Summer Olympics. He finished fourth in the Men's Marathon. Welton also competed in the 1908 Boston Marathon, finishing in ninth place.
