= Frederick Simpson (athlete) =

Canadian marathon runner

Fred Simpson
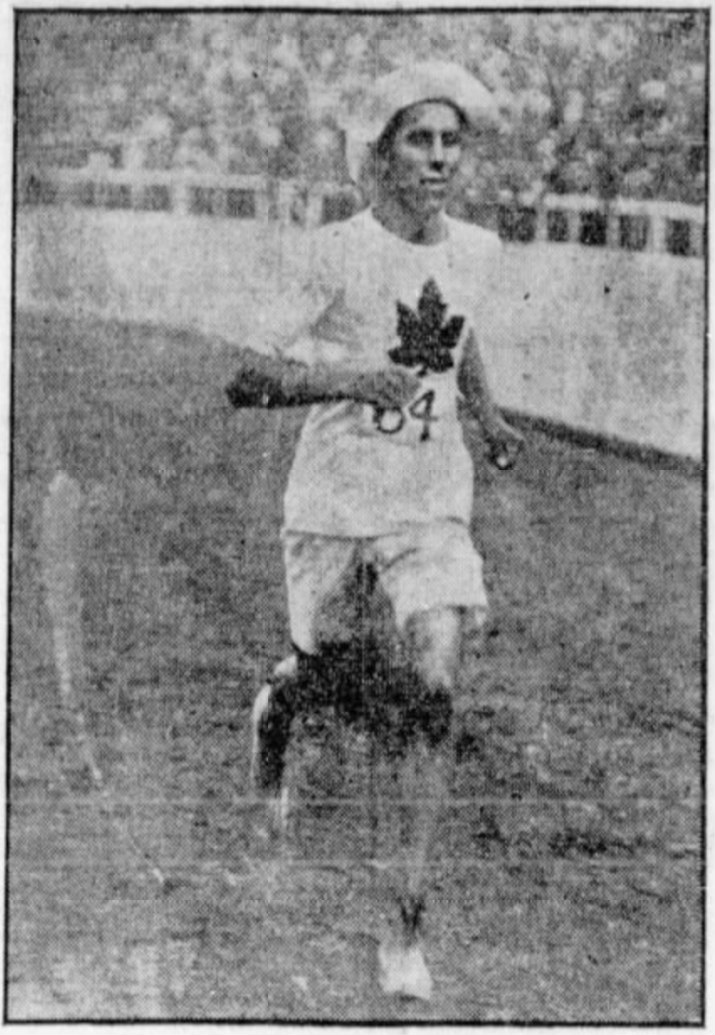
- Simpson at the 1908 Summer Olympics

Personal information
- Full name: Frederick Simpson
- Nationality: Canadian
- Born: March 1878 Alderville Indian Reserve, Ontario, Canada
- Died: May 19, 1945 (aged 67)

Sport
- Sport: Running
- Event: Long-distance

Frederick Simpson (March 1878 – May 19, 1945) was a Mississauga Ojibway Canadian athlete who competed in the Olympic Games in 1908. He was born at the Alderville Indian Reserve, Ontario. He received an invitation to be on the Canadian Olympic Team due to his performances at Peterborough Examiner road race and Hamilton Herald road race, where he finished third and second respectively. Simpson competed in the 1908 Summer Olympics in the men's marathon, but did not win a medal, placing 6th.

Simpson turned professional in 1909, racing in both Canada and the United States. In 1988 Simpson was inducted into the Peterborough & District Sports Hall of Fame.
