= Joseph English (athlete) =

British athlete

Joe English
Personal information
- Nationality: British (English)
- Born: 7 January 1883 Manchester, England
- Died: 7 June 1942 (aged 59) Manchester, England

Sport
- Sport: Athletics
- Event: Middle-distance running
- Club: Manchester AC

Joseph English (7 January 1883 – 7 June 1942) was a British middle-distance runner who competed at the 1908 Summer Olympics.

== Biography ==
English was born in Manchester, England, and became the Northern Counties champion for the first time in 1906. The following year, he became the British steeplechase champion after winning the British AAA Championships title at the 1907 AAA Championships.

English represented the Great Britain team at the 1908 Olympic Games in London, where he participated in the men's 3200 metres steeplechase competition. In his heat he fell and was eliminated. He was also on the start list for the 800 metres but did not take his place.

English would win eight Northern titles in total, with wins coming from 1906 to 1910 and 1912 to 1914 and he would win a second AAA Championship at the 1910 AAA Championships.

During World War I, English received the Distinguished Conduct Medal for repairing telephone lines under enemy fire, while serving as a sapper for the Royal Engineers. After the war, English continued to compete, finishing second to George Gray at the 1919 AAA Championships.

English was a plumber by trade and became a life member of Manchester AC and later served as president for the club.
