= Paul Nettelbeck =

German long-distance runner

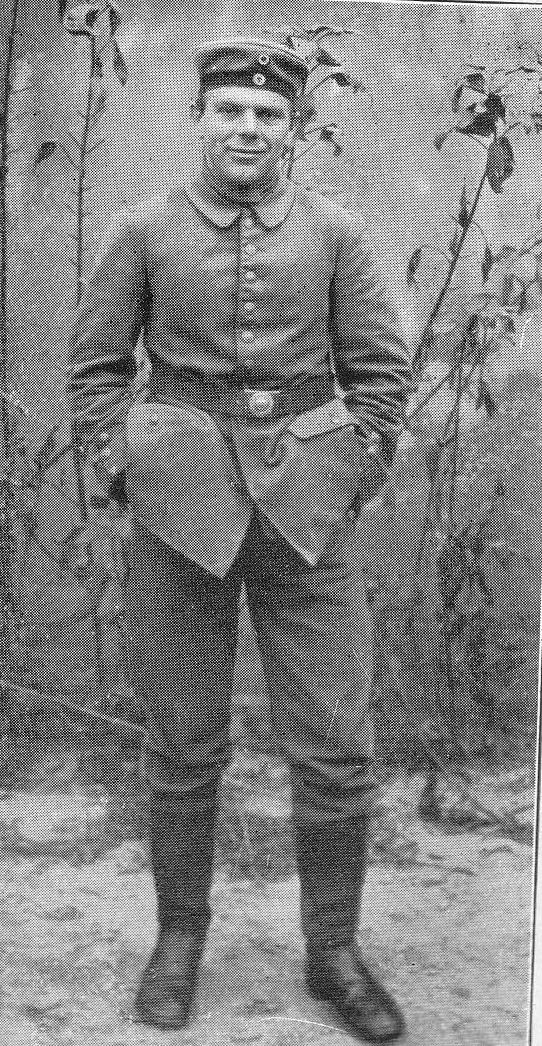

Personal information
- Full name: Franz Paul Nettelbeck
- Nationality: German
- Born: 23 April 1889 Berlin, German Empire
- Died: 14 June 1963 (aged 74) Salzburg, Austria

Sport
- Sport: Long-distance running
- Event: 5 miles

Franz Paul Nettelbeck (23 April 1889 – 14 June 1963) was a German sportsman who excelled as a long-distance runner and cyclist. He competed in the men's 5 mile run at the 1908 Summer Olympics.

Paul Nettelbeck was born in Berlin. He was a competitor in multiple sports and a member of the sports club SC Charlottenburg. In addition to athletics, he played ice hockey, skated, swam and cycled. Prior to the Olympics, Nettelbeck had won the German marathon in Hamburg with a time of 3 hours 10 minutes and was Germany's 1500-metre champion with a time of 4:22.8.

Nettelbeck failed to win a medal at the 1908 Olympics, where he was eliminated after finishing fifth in his heat of the 5 miles and did not start in the marathon, in which he had also been due to compete. Afterwards, Nettelbeck continued to compete in athletics but he later became a professional cyclist, and set several unofficial world records. His autobiography, Vom Marathonlaüfer zum Rad-Rennfahrer, was published in 1925.
