= William Wood (runner) =

Canadian marathon runner

William Henry Wood (6 February 1881 – 13 January 1940) was a Canadian track and field athlete who competed in the 1908 Summer Olympics for Canada. He finished fifth in the Men's Marathon. He was born in Plymouth, England and died in London, Ontario.
