= Frederick Lord (athlete) =

British athlete

Personal information
- Nationality: British (English)
- Born: 11 February 1879 Cleckheaton, West Yorkshire, England
- Died: February 1928 (aged 45) Cleckheaton, West Yorkshire, England

Sport
- Sport: Long-distance running
- Event: Marathon
- Club: Wibsey Park Harriers, Bradford

Frederick Thomas Lord (11 February 1879 – February 1928) was a British track and field athlete who competed in the 1908 Summer Olympics and the 1912 Summer Olympics. He finished 15th and 21st respectively in the men's marathon in his two Olympic games.

== Biography ==
Lord began running at a late stage of his athletic ability, joining the Wibsey Harriers aged 26. Lord represented Great Britain at the 1908 Summer Olympics in London, and finished 15th in the men's marathon. He was only one of four British athletes to complete the race.

Lord represented Great Britain at the 1912 Summer Olympics in Stockholm, finishing 21st in the men's marathon event.

In later life, Lord lived in Cleckheaton and worked for the chemical firm of Crowther & Co. Ltd. While at work in February 1928, he used a knife as a replacement for a shoe-horn. After cutting his heel, he developed septic poisoning and died. He left a widow and four children.
