= Seth Landqvist =

Swedish long-distance runner

Personal information
- Nationality: Swedish
- Born: 8 August 1882 Stockholm, Sweden
- Died: 2 April 1945 (aged 62) Stockholm, Sweden

Sport
- Sport: Long-distance running
- Event: Marathon

Seth Landqvist (8 August 1882 – 2 April 1945) was a Swedish long-distance runner. He competed in the men's marathon at the 1908 Summer Olympics, but failed to finish. He also competed in the men's five miles, finishing ninth.

Landqvist competed for the athletics clubs Fredrikshofs IF and Östermalms IF. He was also a member of the Swedish Olympic team for the 3-mile event at the 1908 Olympics, but did not compete.
