= Frederick Meadows =

Canadian middle- and long-distance runner

Frederick Meadows (11 November 1886 – 17 December 1975) was a Canadian athlete. He competed in the 1908 Summer Olympics in London. In the 1500 metres, Meadows placed third in his initial semifinal heat with a time of 4:12.2. The heat was won by James P. Sullivan in 4:07.6.

== Sources ==
- Cook, Theodore Andrea (1908). The Fourth Olympiad, Being the Official Report. London: British Olympic Association.
- De Wael, Herman (2001). "Athletics 1908". Herman's Full Olympians. Archived from the original on 27 September 2006.
- Wudarski, Pawel (1999). "Wyniki Igrzysk Olimpijskich" (in Polish). Archived from the original on 16 February 2009.
