= Nosworthy =

Nosworthy is a surname. Notable people with the surname include:

- David Nosworthy (born 1967), New Zealand cricket coach
- Janet Nosworthy, Jamaican judge
- Leo Nosworthy (1927–2021), Australian rugby league footballer
- Nyron Nosworthy (born 1980), English football player
- William Nosworthy (1867–1946), New Zealand politician
