= Frederick Bellars =

American long-distance runner

Frederick G. Bellars (January 2, 1888 – May 10, 1971) was an American track and field athlete who competed in the 1908 Summer Olympics. In 1908 he finished eighth in the five miles competition.
