= Richard Yorke =

British athlete

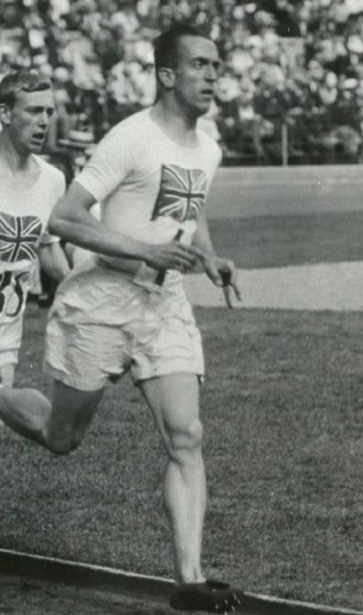

Personal information
- Born: 28 July 1885 Kensington, London, England
- Died: 22 December 1914 (aged 29) Givenchy-lès-la-Bassée, Pas-de-Calais, France

Sport
- Sport: Athletics
- Event: middle distance
- Club: Surrey AC / London Athletic Club

Richard Francis Charles Yorke (28 July 1885 – 22 December 1914) was a British track and field athlete who competed in the 1908 Summer Olympics and in the 1912 Summer Olympics.

In 1908, he was eliminated in the first round of the 3200 metre steeplechase event. Four years later, he was eliminated in the first round of the 800 metres event as well as of the 1500 metres competition.

Yorke finished third in the 1 mile event at the 1909 AAA Championships.

Yorke was killed in action at age 29 during the First World War, serving as a sergeant with the London Scottish Regiment near Arras. He is buried in the Arras Road Cemetery in Roclincourt.

== See also ==
- List of Olympians killed in World War I
