= Salford Harriers =

British athletics club

- Founded: 1884
- Ground: Various
- Location: Manchester, England
- Website: official website

Salford Harriers is a British athletics club based in the North of England. Today they are primarily a cross country and road running club and are based at various locations around Manchester, including SportCity at the Manchester Regional Arena, the Bluebell on Moston Lane and Heaton Park, the Cleavley Athletics Track and Duncan Mathieson Playing Fields Track.

== History ==
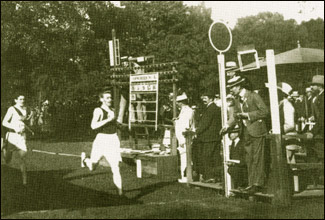
Alfred Tysoe winning 800 metres gold in 1900

Founded in 1884 the Harriers are one of the oldest athletics clubs in England and have a history of producing Olympic athletes and national champions. Originally the club was founded as a cross–country club at the Grapes Hotel in Cross-lane.

From 1888 to 1898 the club won the English National Cross Country Championships six times and with two of the club's athletes Edward W Parry and George Crossland winning the individual title.

The first significant athlete to run in the club colours was Alfred Tysoe who won two gold medals in the 800 metres and the 5000 metres team race at the 1900 Summer Olympics in Paris.

The club established itself over the following decades and by the 1908 Summer Olympics had a major influence, organising Olympic Trials and having seven athletes selected for the Olympic Games.

== Notable athletes ==
=== Olympians ===
Athlete	Events	Games	Medals/Ref
Alfred Tysoe	800m, 5000m team	1900	Gold medal Gold medal
Arthur Astley	400m, 800m	1908	
Harry Barker	3200m steeplechase	1908	
Alex Duncan	marathon	1908	
Billy Grantham	3200m steeplechase	1908	
Sam Hurdsfield	200m	1908	
Henry Pankhurst	100m, 200m, 1,600m relay	1908	
William Shee	1500m, 5 miles	1908	
Josh Smith	1500m	1908	
William Yates	10km walk	1912	
George Gray	110m Hurdles, 400m hurdles	1920	
Walter Rangeley	100m, 200m, 4x100m relay	1924, 1928, 1936	Silver medal Silver medal Bronze medal
George Bailey	3000m steeplechase, 5000m	1932	
Tom Evenson	3000/3200m steeplechase	1932, 1936	Silver medal
William Eaton	10,000m	1936	
Frank Handley	800m	1936	
Bill Roberts	400m, 4x400m relay	1936, 1948	Gold medal
Dorothy Shirley	high jump	1960, 1968	Silver medal
