= Thure Bergvall =

Swedish long-distance runner (1887–1950)

Personal information
- Nationality: Swedish
- Born: 23 November 1887 Stockholm, Sweden
- Died: 20 September 1950 (aged 62) Stockholm, Sweden

Sport
- Sport: Long-distance running
- Event: Marathon

Thure Bergvall (23 November 1887 – 20 September 1950) was a Swedish long-distance runner. He competed in the marathon at the 1906 and 1912 Summer Olympics.
