= Harry Sewell =

British steeplechase runner

Personal information
- Nationality: British (English)
- Born: 8 October 1882 Ilkeston, England
- Died: 15 September 1953 (aged 70) Ilkeston, England

Sport
- Sport: Athletics
- Event: steeplechase
- Club: Derby & County AC

Henry Sewell (October 8, 1882 – September 15, 1953) was a British athlete who competed at the 1908 Summer Olympics.

== Biography ==
Sewell was regarded as one of the best all-rounders in England during the first decade of the 20th century, he was s successful sprinter, middle distance and long distance runner.

Sewell represented Great Britain at the 1908 Summer Olympics in London. In the 3,200 metres steeplechase event first round, Sewell ran a tight race with James Lightbody of the United States, a former Olympic steeplechase champion. Near the end, Sewell pulled away and won by about ten yards. This qualified him for the final, in which he placed fifth.

Sewell was a member of the Derby & County Athletic Club, where he became captain and later president. He was the club 10-mile champion four times.

After athletics, Sewell was a building contractor in Ilkeston and in 1932 was elected as a local councilor.
