= John Noseworthy =

John Noseworthy may refer to:

- Jack Noseworthy (John Noseworthy), American actor
- John Noseworthy (Canadian politician)
- John H. Noseworthy, neurologist and CEO of the Mayo Clinic
- John Noseworthy (English politician) (by 1481–1530/1532), English mayor and MP
