= Edward Cotter (athlete) =

Canadian long-distance runner

Personal information
- Nationality: Canadian
- Born: 27 December 1887
- Died: 17 November 1973 (aged 85)

Sport
- Sport: Long-distance running
- Event: Marathon

Edward Cotter (27 December 1887 – 17 November 1973) was a Canadian long-distance runner. He competed in the men's marathon at the 1908 Summer Olympics.
