= Fred Appleby =

English distance runner

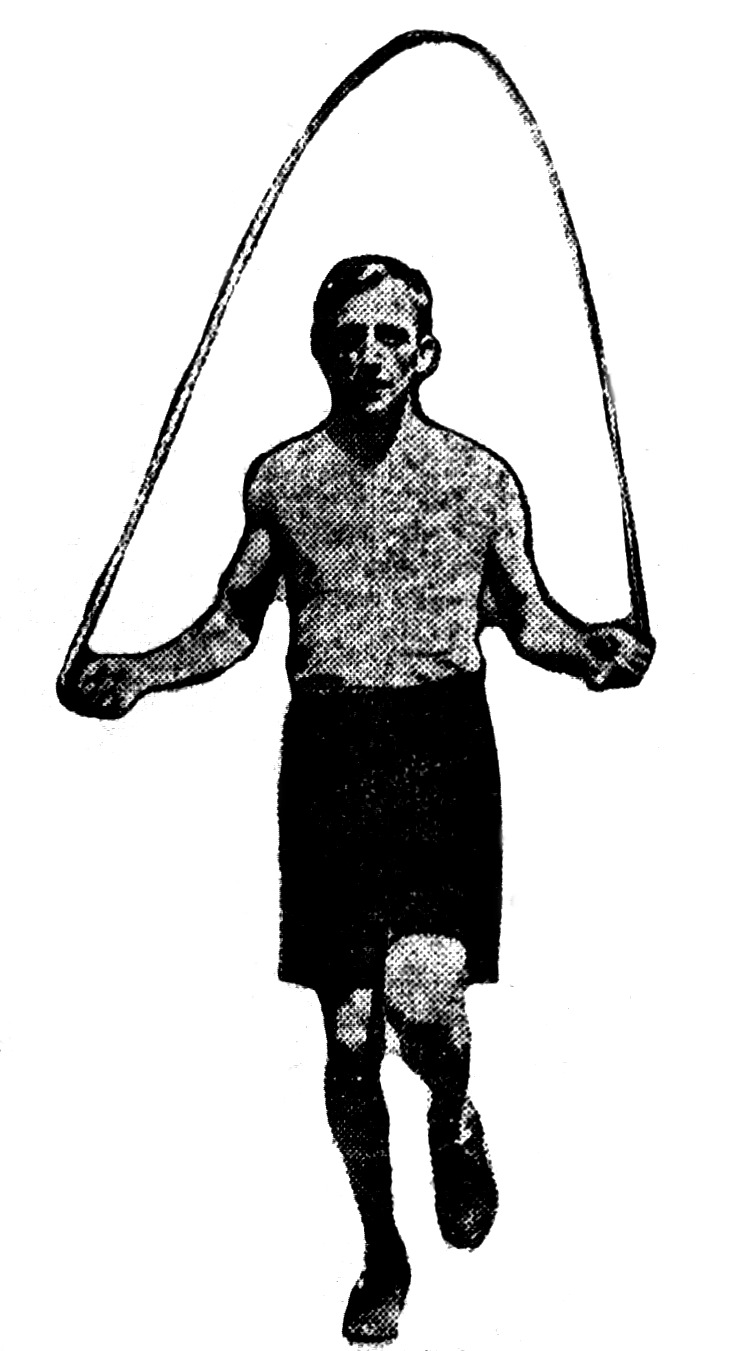

Personal information
- Born: 30 October 1879 Brixton, London
- Died: 7 April 1956 (aged 76) Wandsworth, London

Sport
- Sport: Athletics
- Event: middle-distance
- Club: Herne Hill Harriers

Frederick Appleby (30 October 1879 – 7 April 1956) was a British long-distance runner. In 1902, Appleby set a world record for 15 miles and twice defeated the leading distance runner of the time, Alfred Shrubb. Appleby competed in the 1908 Summer Olympics as a marathoner but failed to finish.

== Career ==
Appleby had a number of top six finishes at the AAA Championships between 1900 and 1902. He finished third behind the Olympic champion Alvin Kraenzlein in the 120 yards event at the 1901 AAA Championships and placed runner-up to defending champion Alfred Shrubb over 4 miles (6.44 km) at the 1902 AAA Championships.

Appleby twice defeated Shrubb over 15 miles (24.14 km) that year. The first of these races was held at Fallowfield on 19 April; the field also included twelve other runners, including Albert Aldridge, who went on to win the AAA 10 mile championship in 1905 and 1906. Shrubb was the world's best distance runner at the time, and although he was better at shorter distances, he still started the race as the favorite. Shrubb did build a large lead early on, while Appleby started slow; however, he moved steadily up the field, catching and passing Shrubb, who had problems with his right leg, with one mile to go. Appleby won the race in 1:22:41, ahead of Aldridge, who also passed Shrubb in the final stages.

The second race was held at Stamford Bridge on 21 July and ended in another victory for Appleby, whose time of 1:20:04.6 broke both Sid Thomas's amateur world record of 1:22:15.4 and William Howitt's professional record of 1:22:00. This time Appleby led most of the way; Shrubb stayed with him until the last lap, and although he eventually lost by 11 seconds he was also well under the previous records. Appleby's splits at 13 miles and 14 miles were also world records, and his split at 12.5 miles (20.12 km) was a best both for that distance and the shorter 20 000 metres.

After 1902, Appleby concentrated on his career as a dentist, although he continued competing in cross-country races. He was selected for Britain's twelve-man marathon contingent for the 1908 Summer Olympics; the reasons for his selection are unclear, as he did compete in the main tryout race but failed to finish. In the Olympic marathon, he dropped out around 19 miles while among the leaders, having problems with his feet.

Appleby briefly became a professional runner in 1909, running several races on the North American professional circuit. He twice faced Paul Acoose, an upcoming Native Canadian runner, over 15 miles; Acoose won the first race by a lap, running 1:22:22, an indoor world record for the distance, while Appleby won the rematch after tacks were thrown on the track. Appleby, with his thick rubber-soled shoes, was not inconvenienced by the tacks, while Acoose, who had been in the lead, used moccasins that they easily penetrated; he was forced to quit. Gamblers backing Appleby were suspected, and all bets on the race were eventually declared void.

Appleby represented the London club of Herne Hill Harriers. He returned to dentistry after his short professional running career.
