= Tommy Clarke (athlete) =

British athlete

Personal information
- Nationality: British (English)
- Born: 13 November 1882 Harmston, Lincolnshire, England
- Died: 2 November 1960 (aged 77) Liverpool, England

Sport
- Sport: Athletics
- Event: Long-distance running
- Club: Sefton Harriers

William Thomas Clarke (13 November 1882 – 2 November 1960) was a British long-distance runner who competed at the 1908 Summer Olympics.

== Biography ==
Clarke was born in Harmston, Lincolnshire, England and was a member of the Sefton Harriers. He began running in 1904 before moving to Liverpool.

In 1907, he won the Northern cross-country title and finished third behind Adam Underwood in the 10 miles event at the 1907 AAA Championships.

In the Olympic year of 1908, Clarke participated in the International Cross-Country, finishing 5th and won the Liverpool Olympic marathon trial. He was however struggling to find work and required help from family to fund him, while he trained for the Olympics.

Clarke represented the Great Britain team at the 1908 Olympic Games in London, where he participated in the men's marathon competition. In the race held on 24 July, Clarke finished in a creditable 13th place and was the highest placed British athlete in the race.
