= Alexander Duncan (athlete) =

British long-distance runner (1884–1959)

Personal information
- Nationality: British
- Born: 24 February 1884 Kendal, Cumbria, England
- Died: 21 January 1959 (aged 74) Kendal, Cumbria, England

Sport
- Sport: Long-distance running
- Event: Marathon
- Club: Salford Harriers

Alexander Duncan (24 February 1884 – 21 January 1959) was a British long-distance runner and competed at the 1908 Summer Olympics. He was considered among the fastest long distance runners in the world.

== Biography ==
Duncan belonged to the Kendal Welcome Harrier Club. Duncan won the English Open Mile in 1902 and came third in the English Half-Mile. He also won the Salford Harrier's sports and Preston Guild mile in 1902. In 1903, he won the Mile at New Brighton and the Two Miles Handicap at Stanley Park in Liverpool. He then picked up more victories in Barrow, Dalton-in-Furness, Darlington, Jendal, Glasgow, and Leeds. Duncan won the British Northern Counties 4 miles race in 1906.

In 1907, Duncan won the Northern Counties 4 miles again and won the 1907 AAA Championships 4 miles. Duncan also came in second place in the 1907 AAA 10 miles race. In 1908, he won the AAA 10 miles race and then won the 22.5 mile English Marathon Olympic Trial.

Duncan became the National 10 miles champion after winning the AAA Championships title at the 1908 AAA Championships.

Duncan competed in the men's marathon at the 1908 Summer Olympics but did not finish along with seven of his teammates.

Duncan was scheduled to race in the US and Canada in 1909 as part of a tour with Fred Appleby. He joined the Kendal Police Force in 1910 and his police duties effectively retired him from the track. He later became a Vice-President of the North Staffordshire Harriers.

Duncan was also said to be skilled at gardening and produced "admired" floral displays". Duncan was married and died on January 21, 1959.
