= Fred Noseworthy =

Canadian distance runner

- Born: 2 May 1871
- Died: 25 February 1942 (aged 70)
- Occupation: Athlete

Frederick Noseworthy (2 May 1871 – 25 February 1942) was a track and field athlete who competed in the 1908 Summer Olympics for Canada. He did not finish the Men's Marathon.
