= Arthur Russell (athlete) =

British athlete (1886–1972)

Personal information
- Born: 13 March 1886 Walsall, Staffordshire, England
- Died: 23 August 1972 (aged 86) Walsall, Staffordshire, England

Sport
- Club: Rugby & District AC
Medal record
Men's athletics
Representing United Kingdom
Olympic Games
Gold medal – first place	1908 London	3200 m steeplechase

Arthur Russell (13 March 1886 – 23 August 1972) was a British athlete. He was the winner of the 3,200-meter steeplechase at the 1908 Summer Olympics for Great Britain.

== Biography ==
Russell, from Staffordshire, won his first AAA title while only 17 years old. He became British national champion after winning the AAA Championships steeplechase event for three successive years from 1904 to 1906.

At the London Olympics, Russell competed in the 3,200 metres steeplechase. In the first round, he was one of only two athletes in his heat to finish, easily defeating the other runner. Russell made the pace in the final for the first mile. Afterward, Russell and American John Eisele fought for the lead until the bell, when Briton Archie Robertson passed Eisele and was only beaten by two yards by Russell, with Eisele 25 yards (23 m) behind.

Russell was a Walsall brick worker who ran for Walsall Harriers. His gold medal is extremely rare as it is made of solid gold, and this was the only time that the 3200-yard event was held.
