= James Fitzgerald (athlete) =

Canadian middle-distance runner

James Frances Fitzgerald (born 3 November 1883, died 1963) was a Canadian athlete. He competed at the 1908 Summer Olympics in London. In the 1500 metres, Fitzgerald placed seventh and last in his initial semifinal heat and did not advance to the final.
