= Robert Pasemann =

German track and field athlete

Personal information
- Born: 14 December 1886 Charlottenburg, German Empire
- Died: 6 October 1968 (aged 81) Hanover, West Germany

Sport
- Sport: Athletics
- Event: high jump/pole jump
- Club: Berliner SC

Erich Wilhelm Robert Pasemann (14 December 1886 – 6 October 1968) was a German track and field athlete who competed in the 1912 Summer Olympics.

== Biography ==
Pasemann was born in Charlottenburg, Berlin and educated as a civil engineer, but worked as a sports teacher. He was one of the first German vegetarian athletes.

Pasemann was nominated for the 1908 London Olympics as a long jumper and gymnast, but broke his arms shortly before the Games and could not compete. This led to Pasemann's track and field career. He won two British AAA Championships titles in the high jump and pole jump events at the 1911 AAA Championships.

At the 1912 Olympic Games, he finished eighth in the long jump competition and eleventh in the pole vault event. Pasemann held several German titles and set 19 German records in field events.

Pasemann died in Hanover in 1968.
