= Dorando Pietri =

Italian long-distance runner

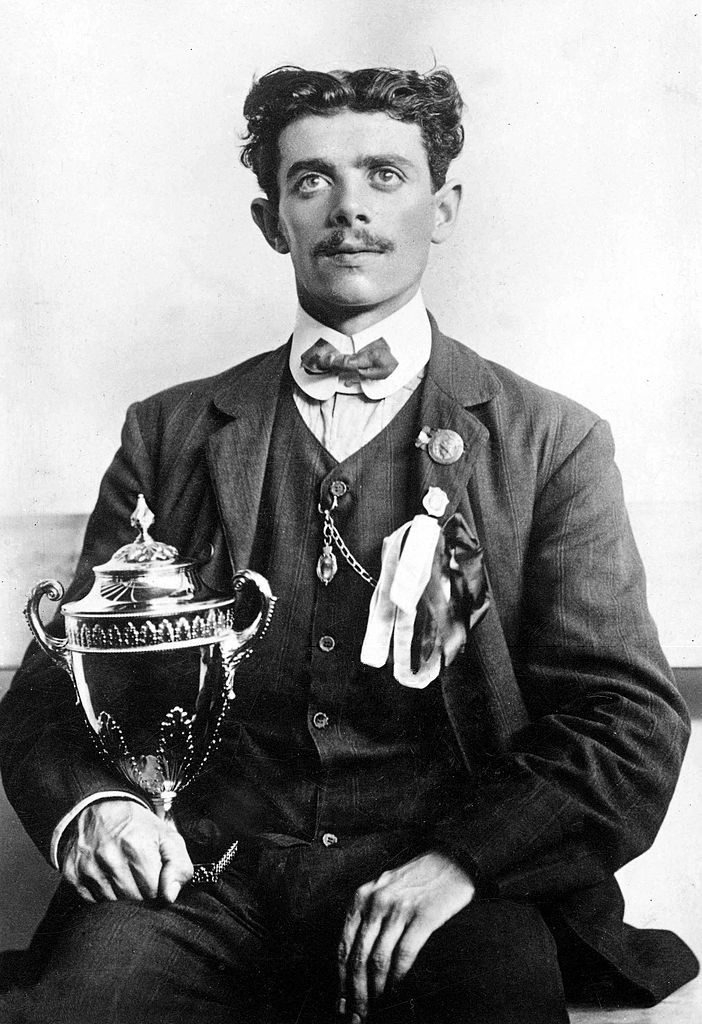
- Pietri holding the gilded silver cup from Queen Alexandra in 1908

Personal information
- Born: 16 October 1885 Correggio, Italy
- Died: 7 February 1942 (aged 56) Sanremo, Italy
- Height: 1.59 m (5 ft 3 in)
- Weight: 60 kg (132 lb)

Sport
- Sport: Athletics
- Event: Long-distance running
- Club: La Patria Carpi

Achievements and titles
- Personal bests: 1500 m: 4:11.0 (1905); 5000 m: 16:08.1 (1905); 10000 m: 32:18.0 (1910); Marathon: 2:38:49 (1910)

Dorando Pietri (Italian pronunciation: [doˈrando ˈpjɛːtri]; often wrongly spelt Petri; 16 October 1885 – 7 February 1942) was an Italian long-distance runner. He finished first in the marathon at the 1908 Summer Olympics in London but was subsequently disqualified.

== Biography ==
=== Early years ===
Pietri was born in Mandrio, a frazione of Correggio, but spent his youth in Carpi (Emilia-Romagna region). Here he worked as a shop-boy at a confectionery shop. He was 1.59 m (5 ft., 2½ in.) tall.

In September 1904 the most famous Italian runner of the time, Pericle Pagliani, took part in a race in Carpi. According to tradition, Pietri was attracted by the event and, still wearing his work clothes, ran to the finish ahead of Pagliani. A few days later Pietri débuted in a distance race, finishing second in the 3,000 m of Bologna.

The following year he achieved his first international success, winning the 30 km in Paris. On 2 April 1906 Pietri won the qualifying marathon for the Olympic Games to be held in Athens that same year. In the Olympic race he retired due to intestinal illness when he was leading by 5 minutes.

In 1907 he won the Italian championships. He was by then the undisputed leader of Italian long distance races from 5000 metres to marathon distance.

=== 1908 Olympics ===
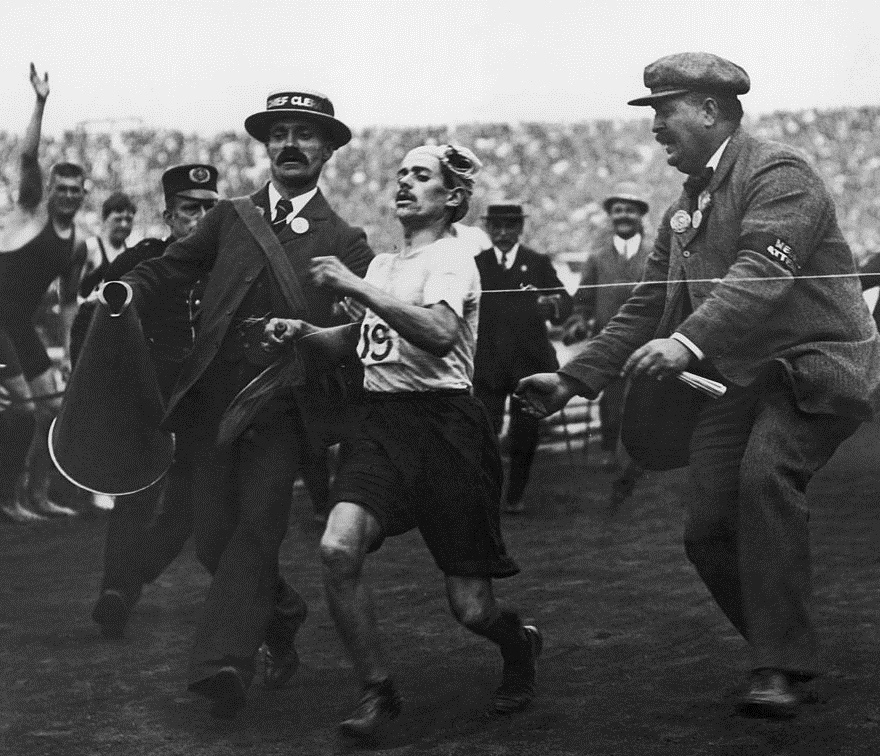
The arrival of Dorando Pietri at the finish of the 1908 Olympics marathon, assisted by Dr. Michael Joseph Bulger (right)

Dorando Pietri trained hard for the 1908 Olympics in London. In a race in Carpi he ran 40 km (25 mi) in 2 hours and 38 minutes, an extraordinary result for the times. The marathon, which was to take place on 24 July 1908, started with 56 competitors, including Pietri and fellow Italian Umberto Blasi. It began at 2:33pm. The weather was particularly hot by British summer standards. The London course measured 42.2 km (26 mi); the distance later became the official marathon length from 1921.

Pietri began his race at a rather slow pace, but in the second half of the course began a powerful surge moving him into second position by the 32 km (20 mi) mark, 4 minutes behind South African Charles Hefferon. When he knew that Hefferon was in crisis, Pietri further increased his pace, overtaking him at the 39 km (24 mi) mark.

The effort took its toll and with only two kilometres (1.2 mi) to go, Pietri began to feel the effects of extreme fatigue and dehydration. When he entered the stadium, he took the wrong path and when umpires redirected him, he fell down for the first time. He got up with their help, in front of 75,000 spectators.

He fell four more times, and each time the umpires helped him up. In the end, though totally exhausted, he managed to finish the race in first place. Of his total time of 2h 54min 46s, ten minutes were needed for that last 350 metres (380 yd). Second was American Johnny Hayes, with a time of 2h 55min 18s. The American team immediately lodged a complaint against the help Pietri received from the umpires. The complaint was accepted and Pietri was disqualified and removed from the final standings of the race.

=== International celebrity ===
As a compensation for the missing medal, Queen Alexandra gave him a gilded silver cup. Arthur Conan Doyle had been commissioned by the Daily Mail to write a special report about the race. He was very impressed by the effort of the Italian at the stadium, which he commented with the words:

"The Italian's great performance can never be effaced from our record of sport, be the decision of the judges what it may."

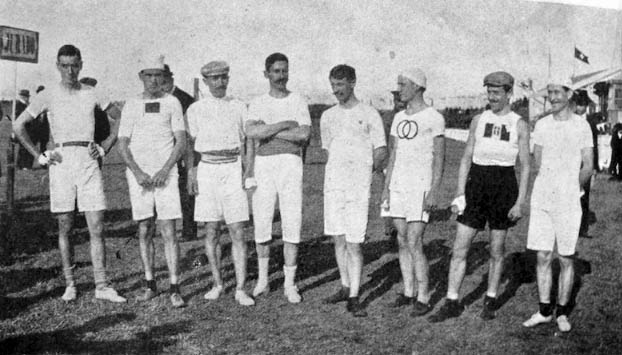
Pietri (second from right) with his competitors of the Argentine marathon of 1910, which he won

Conan Doyle proposed the Daily Mail to start a subscription to raise money and help Pietri to open a bakery in his native town. The fund reached the considerable sum of 300 pounds (equivalent to £31,203 in 2025), to which the same Conan Doyle contributed the initial 5 pounds (equivalent to £520 in 2025).

Pietri suddenly became an international celebrity. Composer Irving Berlin dedicated a song to him entitled "Dorando" and Pietri received requests to participate in exhibition races in the United States. On 25 November 1908, in Madison Square Garden, New York a race between Hayes and Pietri was organized. Pietri won the race as well as a second similar race on 15 March 1909. Pietri won 17 of the 22 races on his tour of America.

He returned to Italy in May 1909 and continued racing professionally in his native country and abroad for two more years. He ran his final marathon in Buenos Aires, on 24 May 1910, where he achieved his personal best of 2h 38min 48:2s.

Pietri's last race in Italy was a 15 km (9 mi) race held in Parma on 3 September 1911, which he won. He also won his very last race, this time in Gothenburg (Sweden), in October of the same year. He was 26 at the time. In three years as a professional runner he earned 200,000 lire in prize money alone, an enormous sum for the time.

He invested his earnings in a hotel he opened in collaboration with his brother. He was not as successful an entrepreneur as he was athlete, and the hotel went bankrupt. He moved to Sanremo, where he directed a car workshop. Pietri lived in Sanremo until his death, of a heart attack, at the age of 56.

== In popular culture ==
Il sogno del maratoneta is an Italian book and TV movie about Pietri's run.

== See also ==
- Legends of Italian sport - Walk of Fame
- Athletics at the 1908 Summer Olympics – Men's marathon
- Marathon world record progression
