= John Tait (runner) =

Canadian middle-distance runner

Personal information
- Born: September 25, 1888 Toronto, Ontario
- Died: July 10, 1971 (aged 82) Scarborough, Toronto, Ontario

Sport
- Sport: Athletics
- Event: Middles distance running
- Club: Toronto West End YMCA, Toronto

John Lindsay Tait (September 25, 1888 – July 10, 1971) was a Canadian athlete. Known as the athletic world's "Boy Wonder", he competed at the 1908 Summer Olympics in London and the 1912 Summer Olympics in Stockholm.

== Biography ==
Tait was born in Toronto, Ontario.

Tait was one of the most versatile middle- and long-distance runners in the world and one of the great milers of his era. In November 1907, he finished just 10 yards behind close friend and sometimes-rival Tom Longboat in the gruelling 15-mile Montreal Marathon road race, with both runners being watched in the streets by a crowd of 200,000. Tait and Longboat duelled and had the time of their young lives three times, in 1907-1908, over the famed 2.5 and 5-mile West End YMCA courses up-and-down the Dovercourt Road—with Tait beating Longboat over 5 miles in July 1907 as a 6-year old Lester Pearson watched in awe from the crowd at the finish line.

Tait ran 4:05 for 1,500 metres at the 1908 Olympic Trials in Rosedale Stadium, Toronto, a Canadian record that stood until 1933. He also won a gold medal in the mile at the Festival of the Empire Sports, the first British Empire Games ever held in London in 1911. Most importantly for him, Canada's team won the championship at Crystal Palace over Great Britain, Australia, and New Zealand. He was awarded both of his pure gold medals by King George V (the 'stutterer's' father). Upon returning to Toronto, his friends and teammates looked on in front of a crowd of 20,000 people outside Old City Hall as Jack Tait sheepishly accepted a new Grandfather Clock from the mayor for his win in the mile. That evening, he received his second great reception in two years inside the Great Hall of the vaunted West End YMCA.

At the 1908 Olympic Games, at just 19 years of age, Tait won his first round heat of the 1500 metres with a time of 4:12.2. Despite the relatively slow time (other heat winners ran as fast as 4:03.4), Tait won by nearly fifty yards. His time in the final was much quicker, at 4:06.8, and he finished in fourth place. Tait also competed in the 1908 marathon and the 5 miles, failing to finish in either event.

Tait also set world indoor records for 880 yards (1:54) in 1909, 1,000 yards (2:14), and 1.5 miles (6:52) in 1910, and established Canadian records at 3 and 5 miles. He remained a devoted amateur and worked throughout his athletic career, running for the West End YMCA of Toronto from 1902 to 1914. Overseeing his career during the "Y" days was YMCA elder and his older brother Will Tait, a coach on the 1908 Canadian Olympic Team and later manager of the Edmonton Gradettes women's basketball team from 1924 to 1936 (which served as the junior/feeder team to the world-famous Edmonton Grads). Jack Tait was also a founding member of the Balmy Beach Harriers Club in 1905, where he and other members of the West End Y and Canadian Olympic teams would set up residence - starting in the Y's 'Marathon House' on the shores of Lake Ontario - and a full training camp all summer, near the bottom of Silver Birch Ave. and the boardwalk, in Toronto's east-end Beach neighborhood.

"Smiling Jack" was well known among fellow athletes and fans throughout North America for his raw speed and talent, public sense of fair play, and for his legendary humour. After he ran his 'slowish', tactical 4:47 to win that Festival of the Empire mile championship, Tait confessed to a group of English reporters: "I'm telling you, boys, if I'd run a mile like that in my own country, I'd be shot. They actually accused me of using my brains out there today. Can you imagine?" Funny indeed, as between 1909 and 1913, he ran the mile on four separate occasions in 4:22, almost fifty years before the 4-minute barrier was finally broken.

Notable friends and teammates of Tait's also include Alfred Shrubb, Bobby Kerr, journalists Doug Laurie and Lou Marsh, and American middle distance runners Abel Kiviat, George Bonhag, and Mel Shepherd. After over 60 years apart, Kiviat paid tribute to his great friendship and rivalry with Tait—citing the support and encouragement he received as a naive 17-year-old from the "older runner with the big heart"—during a televised interview with Johnny Carson on The Tonight Show, in response to the question, "Of all those great athletes you were around, like Jim Thorpe, who do you remember most?"

In 1910, Tait ran a series of famous indoor "match" races against George Bonhag, the undefeated world's "indoor king" and multiple Olympic medalists. With North American telegraph services and newspapers hanging off every race, Tait defeated the American in 2 of 4 races held in New York City at Madison Square Garden and in Buffalo, NY. In one of his victories, Tait beat Bonhag in the Garden one night after the two were hilariously forced to share the same bed for rest in the afternoon due to overcrowding in the New York Athletic Club. That evening, in front of a crowd of 9,000, they both ducked under the existing world indoor record for 1.5 miles, with Tait ahead by 25 yards. He was later celebrated as a conquering hero in the Great Hall of the West End YMCA, at Queen St. and Dovercourt Road -- 'The house that Jack Built', as they called the 'West End Y' from 1904 to 1911 until the famed facility moved to Dovercourt and College St.

Tait finished second behind Douglas McNicol in the 1 mile event at the British 1911 AAA Championships.

After 1911 Tait also found fame as a sports reporter and columnist for the Mail and Empire, Toronto Telegram, Toronto Daily World, and the Toronto Sunday World, co-founding the famous "Yap Yaps Corner" (a popular celebrity sports and humour column) with Mr. Laurie. From 1915 to 1918, he served double duty in The Great War as an artillery gunner in the Canadian Expeditionary Force and as a war correspondent for the Telegram.

In 1912, facing speculative news from doctors that his heart had become enlarged from eight grueling years of training and competition, Tait finished fourth in his heat of the 1500 metres, failing to qualify for the final. He also competed in the marathon, again failing to finish.

Jack Tait resided on Dovercourt Road in Toronto's west end during his athletic career, where from 1903 to 1907, his neighbors were the Rev. Edwin Pearson family. Almost fifty years later, in 1952, one of Mr. Pearson's sons—Lester Bowles Pearson, Prime Minister of Canada from 1963 to 1968—revealed in his first-ever interview about growing up in Toronto that Jack Tait was his first and most profound boyhood hero. Pearson and Tait then began a memorable, humorous correspondence by mail, telephone, and telegram until 1969. From 1926 - 1971, Jack Tait and family lived at 207 Wineva Ave. in the heart of Toronto's famed Beach neighborhood.

== Family ==
Tait is also the grandfather of Paul Williams, a former Canadian record holder and three-time Olympian in 1984, 1988 and 1992.

== Sources ==
- Cook, Theodore Andrea (1908). The Fourth Olympiad, Being the Official Report. London: British Olympic Association.
- De Wael, Herman (2001). "Athletics 1908". Herman's Full Olympians. Archived from the original on 27 September 2006.
- Wudarski, Pawel (1999). "Wyniki Igrzysk Olimpijskich" (in Polish). Archived from the original on 16 February 2009.
- W. Scott Williams, Tait-Williams Archive, Toronto ON; author, Canada's Forgotten Track Star
- John Tait at World Athletics
- John Tait at Tilastopaja (registration required)
- John Tait at Team Canada
- John Tait at Olympedia
- John Tait at InterSportStats
