= William Galbraith (athlete) =

Canadian athlete

William John Breden Galbraith (January 24, 1885 – October 12, 1937) was a Canadian athlete. He competed at the 1908 Summer Olympics in London.

Galbraith led for most of his first round heat of the 1500 metres, but was passed by both of the other runners near the end and did not advance to the final. His time was 4:20.2. In the 3,200 metres steeplechase, Galbraith won his first round heat easily after the only other entrant retired mid-race. His time of 11:12.4 put him in good stead for the final. He did not have much success there, though, finishing last out of the six finalists.

== Sources ==
- Cook, Theodore Andrea (1908). The Fourth Olympiad, Being the Official Report. London: British Olympic Association.
- De Wael, Herman (2001). "Athletics 1908". Herman's Full Olympians. Archived from the original on 27 September 2006.
- Wudarski, Pawel (1999). "Wyniki Igrzysk Olimpijskich" (in Polish).
- William Galbraith at World Athletics
- William Galbraith at Olympedia
