= Ivo Fairbairn-Crawford =

British middle-distance runner

Personal information
- Born: 20 December 1884 Longford, Ireland
- Died: 24 August 1959 (aged 74) Hambleden, England

Sport
- Sport: Athletics
- Event: middle-distance
- Club: Dublin University AC

Ivo Frank Fairbairn-Crawford (born Ivo Frank Fairbairn Crawford; 20 December 1884 – 24 August 1959) was a British/Irish middle-distance runner. He competed at the 1908 Summer Olympics in London.

== Biography ==
Fairbairn-Crawford was educated at Felsted School and became the National 880 yards champion after winning the AAA Championships title at the 1907 AAA Championships.

At the 1908 Olympic Games, represented Great Britain at the 1908 Summer Olympics in London, and competed in the 800 metres; Crawford won his heat in the first round easily, with a time of 1:57.8. He was disqualified in the final, however. Crawford also won his first round heat in the 1500 metres event. He placed fifth in the final with a time of 4:07.6.

Crawford's sister was Loris Callingham, who was killed in the torpedoing of RMS Leinster in 1918. Their father was Frank Fairbairn Crawford, who played first-class cricket in England and South Africa before being killed in the Second Boer War. An uncle, Rev. John Charles Crawford, and his three sons (Ivo and Loris's cousins), Jack, Reginald, and Vivian, all also played first-class cricket, with Jack playing for England.

== Sources ==
- Cook, Theodore Andrea (1908). The Fourth Olympiad, Being the Official Report. London: British Olympic Association.
- De Wael, Herman (2001). "Athletics 1908". Herman's Full Olympians. Archived from the original on 27 September 2006.
- Wudarski, Pawel (1999). "Wyniki Igrzysk Olimpijskich" (in Polish). Archived from the original on 16 February 2009.
