= Jack Crawford =

Jack Crawford may refer to:

== Sports ==
- Jack Crawford (cricketer) (1886–1963), Surrey and South Australia all-rounder
- Jackie Crawford (1896–1975), English footballer during the 1920s and 1930s
- Jack Crawford (tennis) (1908–1991), Australian tennis player of the 1930s
- Jack Crawford (ice hockey) (1916–1973), Canadian ice hockey defenceman and coach
- Jack Crawford (American football) (born 1988), American football player
- Jack Crawford (alpine skier) (born 1997), Canadian skier

== Other ==
- Jack Crawford (sailor) (1775–1831), sailor of the Royal Navy known as the Hero of Camperdown
- John Wallace Crawford (1847–1917), a.k.a. "Captain Jack", American Civil War veteran, Old West scout and poet
- Jack Randall Crawford (1878–1968), author and professor of English at Yale University
- Jack Crawford (politician) (1916–1982), Australian politician
- Jack Crawford (character), fictional FBI agent in Thomas Harris's Hannibal Lecter novels and films

== See also ==
- Jak Crawford (born 2005), American racing driver
- John Crawford (disambiguation)
