= John Crawford =

John Crawford may refer to:

== Arts and entertainment ==
- John Crawford (sculptor) (1830–1861), Glasgow sculptor
- John McKinnon Crawford (1931–2005), Scottish painter and teacher
- John Crawford (actor) (1920–2010), American actor
- Johnny Crawford (1946–2021), American actor and musician
- John Crawford (musician) (born 1960), bassist in the band Berlin
- John Crawford, American cartoonist of the 1980s and 1990s for Flipside
- John Crawford (author), Iraq war veteran and author of The Last True Story I'll Ever Tell: An Accidental Soldier's Account of the War in Iraq
- JonFX, born John Alexander Crawford, Jamaican music producer

== Politics ==
- John Crawford (Manitoba politician) (1856–1928), Manitoba politician
- John Crawford (Tennessee politician), member of the Tennessee House of Representatives
- John Crawford (Wisconsin politician) (1792–1881), American pioneer and politician from Milwaukee County
- John C. Crawford, Wisconsin state assemblyman from Green County
- John G. Crawford, member of the Georgia House of Representatives
- John L. Crawford, doctor and state legislator in Florida
- John Herbert Crawford (politician) (1843–1882), lawyer and political figure in New Brunswick, Canada
- John S. Crawford (1923–1979), Wisconsin state assemblyman from Wood County
- John Willoughby Crawford (1817–1875), Member of the Parliament of Canada

== Sports ==
- John Crawford (cricketer) (1849–1935), English clergyman and cricketer
- John Crawford (footballer) (1880–1934), Scottish football half-back for Lincoln City and Nottingham Forest in the 1900s
- John Crawford (rugby union), Scottish international rugby union player
- Jack Crawford (cricketer) (John Neville Crawford, 1886–1963), Surrey and South Australia cricketer
- John Crawford (footballer, born 1906) (1906-1997), Scottish footballer, see List of Bury F.C. players (1–24 appearances)
- Jack Crawford (tennis) (John Herbert Crawford, 1908–1991), Australian tennis player of the 1930s
- Jack Crawford (ice hockey) (John Shea Crawford, 1916–1973), Canadian ice hockey defenceman and coach

== Other ==
- John Crawford (silversmith) (fl. 1815–1843), American silversmith
- John Martin Crawford (scholar) (1845–1916), U.S. physician, first translator of the Finnish Kalevala into English
- John W. Crawford (1846–?), American medical doctor and mayor of Lawrence, Massachusetts
- John Wallace Crawford (1847–1917), American Civil War veteran, American Old West scout, and poet of western lore
- John Wilson Crawford (1899–1943), Australian Army officer during World War II
- John Crawford (economist) (1910–1984), chancellor of the Australian National University
- John R. Crawford (1915–1976), contract bridge and backgammon player, known for the Crawford-rule
- John Martin Crawford (1962–2020), Canadian serial killer
- John Crawford III (1992–2014), African American man fatally shot by police
- John Crawford (engineer), American computer engineer who won the 1995 Eckert-Mauchly Award
- John David Crawford (1954–1998), professor at the University of Pittsburgh
- John Crawford (physician) (1746–1813), introducer of vaccination into America

== See also ==
- Jack Crawford (disambiguation)
- John Crawfurd (1783–1868), Scottish colonial administrator
- John Herbert Crawford (disambiguation)
- Crawfordjohn, a village in Scotland
