= Athletics at the 1908 Summer Olympics – Men's 800 metres =

Men's 800 metres at the Games of the IV Olympiad
- Venue: White City Stadium
- Dates: July 20, 1908 (semifinals); July 21, 1908 (final)
- Competitors: 38 from 11 nations
- Winning time: 1:52.8 WR

Medalists
| 1st place, gold medalist(s) | | Mel Sheppard | United States |
| 2nd place, silver medalist(s) | | Emilio Lunghi | Italy |
| 3rd place, bronze medalist(s) | | Hanns Braun | Germany |

The men's 800 metres made its fourth Olympic appearance at the 1908 Summer Olympics. The competition was held on July 20, 1908, and on July 21, 1908. The races were held on a track of 536.45 metres=1/3 mile in circumference. It was run in two rounds, with the winners of the eight heats of the first round competing in the final.

38 runners from eleven nations competed. NOCs could enter up to 12 athletes. The event was won by Mel Sheppard of the United States, the nation's second consecutive title in the 800 metres. Sheppard also completed the middle distance double, having won gold in the 1500 metres earlier. Italy (Emilio Lunghi's silver) and Germany (Hanns Braun's bronze) each won their first medal in the 800 metres.

== Background ==
This was the fourth appearance of the event, which is one of 12 athletics events to have been held at every Summer Olympics. Defending champion Jim Lightbody of the United States was the only runner from 1904 to return. His countryman Mel Sheppard was the favorite, however, having won the 1906–1908 AAU championships and the U.S. Eastern Olympic trial.

Finland, the Netherlands, and Sweden appeared in the event for the first time, as did the combined Australasia team (though Australia had previously competed—winning gold—in 1896). Germany, Great Britain, Hungary, and the United States each made their third appearance, tied for the most among all nations.

== Competition format ==
After a single-round competition in 1904, the 1908 event returned to the two-round format used in 1896 and 1900. There were eight semifinals with between 3 and 6 athletes each; only the top runner in each heat advanced to the eight-man final.

== Records ==
These were the standing world and Olympic records (in minutes) prior to the 1908 Summer Olympics.

| World record | Charles Kilpatrick (USA) | 1:53.4 (y)(u) | New York City, United States | 21 September 1895 |
| Olympic record | Jim Lightbody (USA) | 1:56.0(*) | St. Louis, United States | 1 September 1904 |

(*) This track was 536.45 metres=1/3 mile in circumference.

In the final Mel Sheppard set a new Olympic and a new unofficial world record, his time of 1:52.8 being 3.2 seconds faster than the pace set by fellow American runner Jim Lightbody four years earlier.

== Schedule ==
| Date | Time | Round |
|---|---|---|
| Monday, 20 July 1908 | 15:30 | Semifinals |
| Tuesday, 21 July 1908 | 17:00 | Final |

== Results ==
=== Semifinals ===
The semifinals were held on July 20, 1908. The winner of each heat advanced to the final the next day, with all other runners eliminated.

==== Semifinal 1 ====
Ashford went out fast, but dropped out. The race was a tight match between Bodor, Butterfield, and Björn, each of whom led at times, while Lightbody, the defending champion, was always close behind.

| Rank | Athlete | Nation | Time | Notes |
|---|---|---|---|---|
| 1 | Ödön Bodor | Hungary | 1:58.6 | Q |
| 2 | George Butterfield | Great Britain | 1:58.9 | |
| 3 | Evert Björn | Sweden | Unknown | |
| 4 | James Lightbody | United States | Unknown | |
| — | Frederick Ashford | Great Britain | DNF | |
| — | Henk van der Wal | Netherlands | DNF | |

==== Semifinal 2 ====
The second heat was less eventful than the preceding one, with Sheppard leading most of the way; Lintott closed quickly but was four yards behind at the finish.

| Rank | Athlete | Nation | Time | Notes |
|---|---|---|---|---|
| 1 | Mel Sheppard | United States | 1:58.0 | Q |
| 2 | James Lintott | Great Britain | 1:58.8 | |
| 3 | Irving Parkes | Canada | Unknown | |

==== Semifinal 3 ====
Halstead took the lead after 500 metres and held on to beat Lee by two yards.

| Rank | Athlete | Nation | Time | Notes |
|---|---|---|---|---|
| 1 | John Halstead | United States | 2:01.4 | Q |
| 2 | John W. Lee | Great Britain | 2:01.7 | |
| 3 | George Morphy | Great Britain | Unknown | |
| 4 | József Nagy | Hungary | Unknown | |

==== Semifinal 4 ====
Lunghi broke away from the pack near the end of the first lap, leading the rest of the way.

| Rank | Athlete | Nation | Time | Notes |
|---|---|---|---|---|
| 1 | Emilio Lunghi | Italy | 1:57.2 | Q |
| 2 | Harry Coe | United States | 1:58.0 | |
| 3 | Lloyd Jones | United States | Unknown | |
| — | Stylianos Dimitriou | Greece | DNF | |
| — | Larry Manogue | Great Britain | DNF | |

==== Semifinal 5 ====
The fifth heat was the closest of the first round, despite Beard leading the entire way. Buddo and Astley both made tremendous efforts to catch up in the second lap. Astley caught and passed Buddo, but was unable to do the same with Beard, who won by a foot.

| Rank | Athlete | Nation | Time | Notes |
|---|---|---|---|---|
| 1 | Clarke Beard | United States | 1:59.8 | Q |
| 2 | Arthur Astley | Great Britain | 1:59.9 | |
| 3 | Donald Buddo | Canada | Unknown | |
| 4 | Oskar Quarg | Germany | 2:10.0 | |
| — | Edward Dahl | Sweden | DNF | |
| — | Charles M. French | United States | DNF | |

==== Semifinal 6 ====
Just won by fifty yards.

| Rank | Athlete | Nation | Time | Notes |
|---|---|---|---|---|
| 1 | Theodore Just | Great Britain | 1:57.8 | Q |
| 2 | Andreas Breynck | Germany | 2:06.0 | |
| — | Gösta Danielson | Sweden | DNF | |
| — | Arie Vosbergen | Netherlands | DNF | |

==== Semifinal 7 ====
Bromilow led for most of the race, but Braun used the last turn to move from third to first.

| Rank | Athlete | Nation | Time | Notes |
|---|---|---|---|---|
| 1 | Hanns Braun | Germany | 1:58.0 | Q |
| 2 | Joseph Bromilow | United States | 1:58.3 | |
| 3 | Harold Holding | Great Britain | 1:58.5 | |
| — | Bram Evers | Netherlands | DNF | |
| — | Horace Ramey | United States | DNF | |
| — | Fredrik Svanström | Finland | DNF | |

==== Semifinal 8 ====
While not having quite the dominant lead that his countryman Just had in the sixth heat, Crawford won by fifteen yards.

| Rank | Athlete | Nation | Time | Notes |
|---|---|---|---|---|
| 1 | Ivo Fairbairn-Crawford | Great Britain | 1:57.8 | Q |
| 2 | Kristian Hellström | Sweden | 2:00.0 | |
| 3 | Harvey Sutton | Australasia | 2:00.0 | |
| 4 | Francis Sheehan | United States | Unknown | |

=== Final ===
The final was held on July 21, 1908. Crawford started out fast, leading by fifteen yards halfway through the first lap, but at the end of the lap, he collapsed on the track from exhaustion. Sheppard then took the lead, with Lunghi and Just immediately behind. The time at the 400 metres mark was only 53 seconds. Just could not keep up the pace, fading back to fifth place. Lunghi's efforts were not enough for him to stay with Sheppard the entire way, and Sheppard won by 11 yards; the first four finishers broke Jim Lightbody's Olympic record of four years earlier.

| Rank | Athlete | Nation | Time | Notes |
|---|---|---|---|---|
| 1st place, gold medalist(s) | Mel Sheppard | United States | 1:52.8 | WR |
| 2nd place, silver medalist(s) | Emilio Lunghi | Italy | 1:54.2 | |
| 3rd place, bronze medalist(s) | Hanns Braun | Germany | 1:55.2 | |
| 4 | Ödön Bodor | Hungary | 1:55.4 | |
| 5 | Theodore Just | Great Britain | 1:56.4 | |
| 6 | John Halstead | United States | Unknown | |
| — | Clarke Beard | United States | DNF | |
| — | Ivo Fairbairn-Crawford | Great Britain | DNF | |
