= John Craufurd =

John Craufurd may refer to:

- John Craufurd (MP, died 1814) (c. 1742–1814), member of parliament for Old Sarum, for Renfrewshire, and for Glasgow Burghs
- John Craufurd (British Army officer) (c. 1725–1764), member of parliament for Berwick-upon-Tweed

== See also ==
- John Crawford (disambiguation)
- John Crawfurd, Scottish physician, colonial administrator, diplomat, and author
