= John W. Lee =

British athlete

John Lee
Personal information
- Nationality: British (English)
- Born: 13 January 1881 West Hartlepool, England
- Died: 22 August 1960 (aged 79) Sedgley, England

Sport
- Sport: Athletics
- Event: 800m/880y
- Club: West Hartlepool Harriers; Heaton Harriers

John William Lee (13 January 1881 – 22 August 1960) was a British athlete. He competed in the 1908 Summer Olympics in London.

== Biography ==
Also known as Jack Lee, he was affiliated with Heaton Harriers, a Newcastle upon Tyne-based club, although he started his career with West Hartlepool Harriers. He twice finished third behind George Butterfield in the 1 mile event at the 1906 AAA Championships and 1907 AAA Championships.

Lee represented Great Britain at the 1908 Summer Olympics in London. In the 800 metres, Lee finished second in his semifinal heat and did not advance to the final. His time was 2:01.7, only .3 seconds behind John Halstead's winning time. Lee's time in the 1500 metres semifinals was 4:12.4, putting him in fourth place in the heat and eliminating him from the final.

Lee went on to serve as chairman of Newcastle United F.C. from 1949 to 1953.

== Sources ==
- Cook, Theodore Andrea (1908). The Fourth Olympiad, Being the Official Report. London: British Olympic Association.
- De Wael, Herman (2001). "Athletics 1908". Herman's Full Olympians. Archived from the original on 27 September 2006.
- Wudarski, Pawel (1999). "Wyniki Igrzysk Olimpijskich" (in Polish). Archived from the original on 16 February 2009.
