= Pál Simon (athlete) =

Hungarian athlete (1883–1956)

Personal information
- Full name: Pál János Simon
- Born: 16 March 1883 Budapest, Kingdom of Hungary
- Died: 15 January 1956 (aged 72) Budapest, Kingdom of Hungary
- Height: 182 cm (6 ft 0 in)
- Weight: 76 kg (168 lb)

Sport
- Club: Magyar AC
Medal record
Men's athletics
Representing Hungary
Olympic Games
Bronze medal – third place	1908 London	Medley relay

Pál Simon (16 March 1883 – 15 January 1956) was a Hungarian athlete. He competed at the 1908 Summer Olympics in London.

Simon was a member of the Hungarian medley relay team that won a bronze medal. He was the first runner on the squad, running 200 metres. He was followed by Frigyes Wiesner, József Nagy, and Ödön Bodor. Simon gave the team a ten-yard lead over the Swedish team after his leg of the first round race. However, the Swedes made up the distance and nearly eliminated the Hungarians. Bodor made an excellent effort and regained the lead in the second half of the race. In the final, Simon made his transfer while six yards behind the American team but a yard in front of the German squad. The team held second place until the final leg, in which Hanns Braun passed Bodor to relegate the Hungarians to bronze medals.

Simon also competed in the 100 and 200 metres races, finishing second and fourth in the first round heats of those races. He did not advance to the final in either race.

== Sources ==
- Cook, Theodore Andrea (1908). The Fourth Olympiad, Being the Official Report. London: British Olympic Association.
- De Wael, Herman (2001). "Athletics 1908". Herman's Full Olympians.
- Wudarski, Pawel (1999). "Wyniki Igrzysk Olimpijskich" (in Polish).
