= Morphy (disambiguation) =

Paul Morphy was an American chess player, considered an unofficial world champion in the late 1850s.

Morphy may also refer to:

== People ==
- Alonzo Morphy (1798–1856), American lawyer, Attorney General of Louisiana
- Countess Morphy (1883–1938), nom de plume of British-American author Marcelle Azra Hincks
- Donal Morphy (1900–1975), British electrical engineer
- Florence Morphy (c. 1860–1944), Australian-born Countess of Darnley
- Garret Morphy (c. 1655–c. 1716), Irish painter
- George Morphy (1884–1946), Irish athlete
- Guillermo Morphy (1836–1899), Spanish aristocrat, musicologist and composer
- Harold Morphy (1902–1987), British rower
- Howard Morphy (born 1947), British anthropologist
- Hugh Boulton Morphy (1860–1932), Canadian politician

== See also ==
- Morphe Cosmetics, American cosmetic retailer
- Morphine, pain medication of the opiate family
