= Athletics at the 1908 Summer Olympics – Men's medley relay =

Men's medley relay at the Games of the IV Olympiad
- Venue: White City Stadium
- Dates: 24 July 1908 (semifinals); 25 July 1908 (final)
- Competitors: 28 from 7 nations

Medalists
1st place, gold medalist(s)		Nate Cartmell; William Hamilton; Mel Sheppard; John Taylor	United States
2nd place, silver medalist(s)		Hanns Braun; Hans Eicke; Arthur Hoffmann; Otto Trieloff	Germany
3rd place, bronze medalist(s)		Ödön Bodor; József Nagy; Pál Simon; Frigyes Wiesner	Hungary

The men's medley relay was run for the first time at the 1908 Summer Olympics in London. The event consisted of 1600 metres being run by four athletes per team. Unlike the later 4 × 400 metres relay, however, the athletes had different distances to run. In the medley, the first two runners each ran 200 metres. The third runner ran 400 and the fourth ran 800. The competition was held on 24 and 25 July 1908. 28 runners from 7 nations competed. NOCs could enter one team of four, with four reserves.

The event was run in two rounds.

== Background ==
This was the first relay race run at the Olympics. Rather than use a baton, the runners changed legs by touching hands as was common at the time.

The event would later come to be known as the sprint medley relay, which is rarely run in international competition but is still run at events like the Penn Relays.

== Records ==
This was the Olympic debut of the event. The record for the 4 × 440 yards relay at the time, an event over a similar distance but with equal distance legs instead of the 2-2-4-8 medley, was 3:21 2/5 seconds.

World record	New York AC (B.J. Wefers (USA), M.W. Long (USA), T.E. Burke (USA), H.S. Lyons (USA))	3:21 2/5 (4 × 440 yards)	New York City	28 August 1898
Olympic record	N/A			

== Results ==
=== First round ===
All first round heats were held on 24 July.

First round, heat 1

Simon had a ten-yard lead over Laaftman at the end of the 200 metre leg; after Lindberg gained on Racz, Stenborg passed Nagy during the 400 metre leg, giving Björn a three-yard advantage over Bodor to begin the second half of the race. Bodor was up to the task, and ran the split in 1:56.6 to pass Björn and win a close contest by three yards.

Place	Name	Nation	Time
1	Pál Simon; Frigyes Wiesner; József Nagy; Ödön Bodor	Hungary	3:32.6
2	Sven Låftman; Knut Lindberg; Knut Stenborg; Evert Björn	Sweden	(3:33.0)

First round, heat 2

The German team dominated this heat, with each runner increasing the lead: Braun crossed the finish line 90 yards ahead of Evers.

Place	Name	Nation	Time
1	Arthur Hoffmann; Hans Eicke; Otto Trieloff; Hanns Braun	Germany	3:43.2
2	Evert Koops; Jacobus Hoogveld; Victor Henny; Bram Evers	Netherlands	(3:55.4)

First round, heat 3

Hamilton gave the Americans a slight lead at the end of the first 200 metres, with the Canadians in second and the British in third.

Cartmell increased the lead as Pankhurst caught up to Buddo near the end of the second 200. In the 400 leg, Taylor held the American lead while Montague ensured second place for the Britons.

Just had little chance of catching Sheppard, who had won the individual 800 metres, in the second half of the race, and Sheppard crossed the finish line 25 yards in front of the British team.

Place	Name	Nation	Time
1	William Hamilton; Nate Cartmell; John Taylor; Mel Sheppard	United States	3:27.2
2	George Hawkins; Henry Pankhurst; Edwin Montague; Theodore Just	Great Britain	3:32.0
3	Frank Lukeman; Donald Buddo; Louis Sebert; R. Irving Parkes	Canada	unknown

=== Final ===
The final was held on 25 July.

At the end of the first 200 metres, Hamilton had a six-yard lead over Simon, with Hoffmann about a yard behind the Hungarian. Cartmell and Taylor increased the American lead, and Sheppard, who began the second half of the race with a fifteen-yard lead over Bodor, pulled away to win by twenty-five yards.

Braun and Bodor had a duel for second place, with the German, who had a five-yard deficit at the beginning of the 800 metres, winning an exciting contest by five inches.

Place	Name	Nation	Split	Time
1	William Hamilton; Nate Cartmell; John Taylor; Mel Sheppard	United States	0:22.0; 0:22.2; 0:49.8; 1:55.4	3:29.4
2	Arthur Hoffmann; Hans Eicke; Otto Trieloff; Hanns Braun	Germany		3:32.4
3	Pál Simon; Frigyes Wiesner; József Nagy; Ödön Bodor	Hungary		3:32.5
