= Theodore Just =

British middle-distance runner

Personal information
- Born: 23 April 1886 Bristol, England
- Died: 13 February 1937 (aged 50) Marylebone, London, England

Sport
- Sport: Athletics
- Event: middle-distance
- Club: University of Cambridge AC; Achilles Club

Achievements and titles
- Olympic finals: 1908

Theodore Hartman Just (23 April 1886 – 13 February 1937) was a British athlete. He competed at the 1908 Summer Olympics in London.

== Biography ==
Just was educated at St Paul's School, London and Trinity College, Cambridge, winning his blue from 1907 to 1909. He would later study medicine at St Bartholomew's Hospital (St. Bart's).

Just became the National 880 yards champion after winning the AAA Championships title at the 1908 AAA Championships.

At the 1908 Olympic Games, he represented Great Britain at the 1908 Summer Olympics in London, in the 800 metres, winning his first round heat easily with a time of 1:57.8. He then placed fifth in the final with a time of 1:56.4.

He was also a member of the British relay team. He ran the 800 metres in the medley relay competition, but his team was eliminated in the first round.

During World War I, he served as a major in the RAMC before going to work St. Bart's as an Otorhinolaryngology surgeon.

== Sources ==
- Cook, Theodore Andrea (1908). The Fourth Olympiad, Being the Official Report. London: British Olympic Association.
- De Wael, Herman (2001). "Athletics 1908". Herman's Full Olympians.
- Wudarski, Pawel (1999). "Wyniki Igrzysk Olimpijskich" (in Polish).
- Theodore Just at World Athletics
- Theodore Just at Olympedia
