= Donald Buddo =

Canadian athlete

Donald Smith Buddo (November 6, 1886 – July 27, 1965) was a Canadian athlete who competed at the 1908 Summer Olympics in London. He was born in Montreal, Quebec and died in London, Ontario.

In the 800 metres event, Buddo finished third in his initial semifinal heat and did not advance to the final.

Buddo lost his preliminary heat of the 400 metres competition to Georges Malfait, with a time of 51.2 seconds to Malfait's 50.0 seconds and did not advance to the semifinals.

He was also a member of the Canadian relay team, which was eliminated in the first round of the medley relay event. Before the First World War, he played hockey with the famed Montreal Wanderers. In 1910, Don Buddo was a star halfback with the Edmonton Club of the old Western Football League.

== Sources ==
- profile
- Cook, Theodore Andrea (1908). The Fourth Olympiad, Being the Official Report. London: British Olympic Association.
- De Wael, Herman (2001). "Athletics 1908". Herman's Full Olympians. Archived from the original on 27 September 2006.
- Wudarski, Pawel (1999). "Wyniki Igrzysk Olimpijskich" (in Polish). Archived from the original on 16 February 2009.
