= Charles M. French =

American athlete

Charles Martin French (June 13, 1876 – June 24, 1972) was an American athlete. He competed in the 1908 Summer Olympics in London in the 800 metres.

French graduated from Cornell University in 1909 and was a member of the Sphinx Head Society, an honor society recognizing leadership and contributions to the university community.

French died on June 24, 1972, in St. Petersburg, Florida, at the age of 87.

== Athletic career ==
While competing for Cornell, French achieved significant success in middle-distance running. He secured second place in the 880-yard event at the 1908 Intercollegiate Association of Amateur Athletes of America (IC4A) championships and third place in the same event in both 1907 and 1909. The 1908 IC4A meet served as one of the Olympic selection events, leading to his qualification for the U.S. Olympic team. At the 1908 London Olympics, French competed in the 800 metres but did not advance past the semifinals. His personal best in the 880-yard was recorded at 1:58.6 in 1909.

== Professional Life ==
After completing his athletic career and education, French transitioned into the banking sector. He worked for the Seymour Trust Company in Seymour, Connecticut, contributing to the financial industry with the same dedication he had shown in athletics.

== Sources ==
- Cook, Theodore Andrea (1908). The Fourth Olympiad, Being the Official Report. London: British Olympic Association.
- De Wael, Herman (2001). "Athletics 1908". Herman's Full Olympians. Archived from the original on 27 September 2006.
- Wudarski, Pawel (1999). "Wyniki Igrzysk Olimpijskich" (in Polish). Archived from the original on 16 February 2009.
- Charles M. French at World Athletics
- Charles M. French at Olympedia
