= Oskar Quarg =

German athlete

Max Oskar Robert Quarg (September 15, 1887 - July 17, 1969) was a German athlete who competed at the 1908 Summer Olympics in London. In the 800 metres, Quarg placed fourth in his semifinal heat and did not advance to the final. His time was 2:10.0.

== Sources ==
- Cook, Theodore Andrea (1908). The Fourth Olympiad, Being the Official Report. London: British Olympic Association.
- De Wael, Herman (2001). "Athletics 1908". Herman's Full Olympians. Archived from the original on 27 September 2006.
- Wudarski, Pawel (1999). "Wyniki Igrzysk Olimpijskich" (in Polish).
- DGLD profile
- Oskar Quarg's profile at Sports Reference.com
- Oscar Quarg at World Athletics
- Oscar Quarg at Olympedia
