= Clarke Beard =

American middle-distance runner

Clarke Briar Beard (November 29, 1884 – November 1978) was an American athlete who competed in the 1908 Summer Olympics in London.

In the 800 metres, Beard won a close race in the first round. His time was 1:59.2. In the final, Beard was disqualified.
