= Arthur Hoffmann (athlete) =

German athlete (1887–1932)

Olympic medal record

Men's athletics

Representing Germany
Silver medal – second place	1908 London	Medley relay

Arthur ("Aute") Hoffmann (10 December 1887 – 6 April 1932) was a German athlete. He competed at the 1908 Summer Olympics in London. He was born in Danzig, and died in Hamburg, Germany.

Hoffmann was a member of the silver medal German medley relay team. He was the first runner of the four-man squad, running 200 metres and followed by Hans Eicke, Otto Trieloff, and Hanns Braun. The team dominated the first round, defeating the Dutch team easily with a time of 3:43.2. In the final, though, the Germans could not match the American team. Hoffmann was seven yards behind the leading American and one behind the second-place Hungarian when he finished his 200. The German team moved into second place at the very end of the race, however, giving Hoffmann a silver medal.

Hoffman also competed in the 100 metre and 200 metre races, placing second in his first round heats in both and not advancing. In the long jump competition he finished 15th.

== Sources ==
- Cook, Theodore Andrea (1908). The Fourth Olympiad, Being the Official Report. London: British Olympic Association.
- De Wael, Herman (2001). "Athletics 1908". Herman's Full Olympians. Archived from the original on 27 September 2006.
- Wudarski, Pawel (1999). "Wyniki Igrzysk Olimpijskich" (in Polish). Archived from the original on 14 June 2006.
