= Hanns Braun =

German athlete (1886–1918)

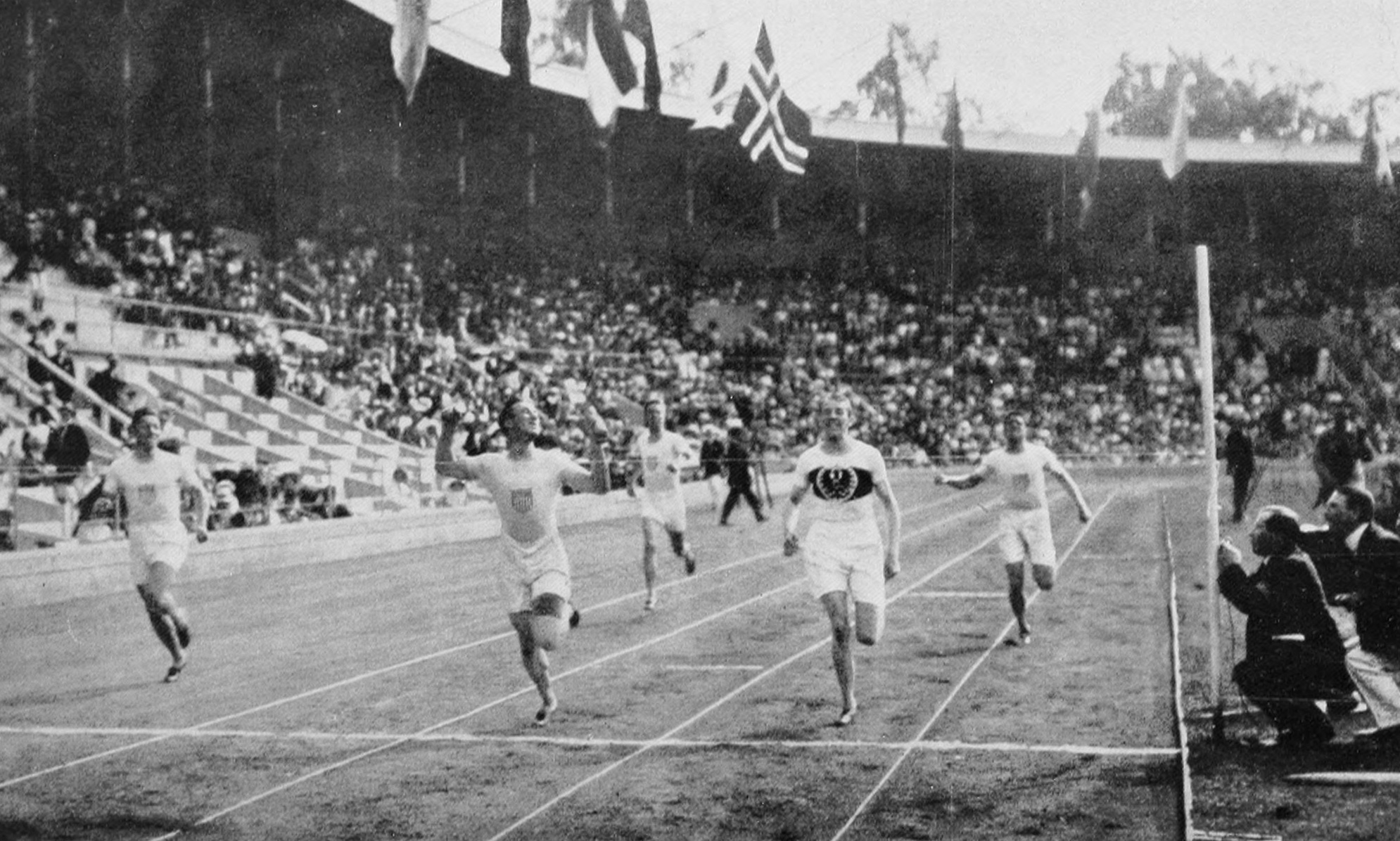

Personal information
- Born: 26 October 1886 Munich, Germany
- Died: 9 October 1918 (aged 31) Nr. Fonsomme, Aisne, France

Sport
- Sport: Athletics
- Event: 400/800 metres
- Club: Münchner SC
Medal record
Men's athletics
Representing Germany
Silver medal – second place	1908 London	Medley relay
Silver medal – second place	1912 Stockholm	400 metres
Bronze medal – third place	1908 London	800 metres

Hans Karl Friedrich Wilhelm Braun (26 October 1886 – 9 October 1918) was a German athlete.

== Biography ==
He was born in Wernfels (today Spalt) and died near Saint-Quentin, Aisne, France as fighter-pilot in an airplane-crash in World War I.

He won the bronze medal in the men's 800 metres race at the 1908 Summer Olympics in London with a time of 1:55.2, which was .8 seconds faster than the previous Olympic record but 3 seconds slower than the time of Mel Sheppard, the winner of the race—his semifinal time had been 1:58.0.

Braun was also a member of the silver medal German medley relay team. He ran the final 800 metres of the 1600 metre race, following Arthur Hoffmann, Hans Eicke, and Otto Trieloff. The team had an easy time defeating the Dutch squad in the first round, finishing in a time of 3:43.2. The final was a more difficult race, however, and the Germans never had a chance of catching the Americans. The first three runners found themselves in third place, and Braun began his leg five yards behind the Hungarian runner. He was able to catch up and pass Ödön Bodor, however, giving the Germans a second-place victory of a tenth of a second at 3:32.4.

Braun also ran in the 1500 metres. He placed third in his first round (semifinal) heat with a time of 4:18.2 and did not advance to the final.

Braun was a three-time winner of the British AAA Championships. He won the British 880 yards title at the 1909 AAA Championships, the 1911 AAA Championships and the 1912 AAA Championships.

== See also ==
- List of Olympians killed in World War I

== Notes ==
- Cook, Theodore Andrea (1908). The Fourth Olympiad, Being the Official Report. London: British Olympic Association.
- De Wael, Herman (2001). "Athletics 1908". Herman's Full Olympians. Archived from the original on 27 September 2006.
- Wudarski, Pawel (1999). "Wyniki Igrzysk Olimpijskich" (in Polish). Archived from the original on 16 February 2009.
- Hanns Braun at World Athletics
- Hanns Braun at Tilastopaja (registration required)
- Hanns Braun at Olympedia
