= Hans Eicke =

German athlete (1885–1947)

Medal record

Men's athletics

Representing Germany

Olympic Games
Silver medal – second place	1908 London	Medley relay

Hans Eicke (1 December 1885 – 22 August 1947) was a German athlete. He competed at the 1908 Summer Olympics in London.

== Career ==
Eicke was born and died in Berlin. Eicke was a member of the silver medal German medley relay team. He was the second runner on the squad, running the second 200 metres. He followed Arthur Hoffmann and was followed by Otto Trieloff and Hanns Braun.

The team dominated the first round, defeating the Dutch team easily with a time of 3:43.2. In the final, though, the Germans could not match the American team. Eicke was seven yards behind the leading American and one behind the second-place Hungarian when he started his 200 and had not caught the Hungarian when he finished it. However, the German team moved into second place at the end of the race, giving Eicke a silver medal. Eicke also competed in the 100 metres, placing third in his first round heat with a time of 11.6 seconds to be eliminated without advancing to the semifinals.

== Sources ==
- Cook, Theodore Andrea (1908). The Fourth Olympiad, Being the Official Report. London: British Olympic Association.
- De Wael, Herman (2001). "Athletics 1908". Herman's Full Olympians. Archived from the original on 27 September 2006.
- Wudarski, Pawel (1999). "Wyniki Igrzysk Olimpijskich" (in Polish).
