= Harold Holding =

British athlete

Personal information
- Nationality: British (English)
- Born: 12 April 1883 Newmarket, England
- Died: 20 July 1925 (aged 42) Coventry, England

Sport
- Sport: Athletics
- Event: middle-distance
- Club: University of Oxford AC; Achilles Club

Harold Evelyn Holding (12 April 1883 – 20 July 1925) was a British athlete who competed in the 1908 Summer Olympics.

== Biography ==
Holding was born in Newmarket, Suffolk and educated at Oriel College, Oxford. He ran in the Oxbridge Sports from 1902 to 1905. After winning an Oxbridge versus Yale match he set a time of 1.56.2, which ranked the second fastest in the world rankings that year.

Holding represented Great Britain at the 1908 Summer Olympics in London. In the 800 metres, Holding finished third in his initial semifinal heat and did not advance to the final. His time was 1:58.5.

Holding became a solicitor in London. He died in Coventry as a result of a motor vehicle accident.

== Sources ==
- Cook, Theodore Andrea (1908). The Fourth Olympiad, Being the Official Report. London: British Olympic Association.
- De Wael, Herman (2001). "Athletics 1908". Herman's Full Olympians. Archived from the original on 27 September 2006.
- Wudarski, Pawel (1999). "Wyniki Igrzysk Olimpijskich" (in Polish). Archived from the original on 16 February 2009.
- Harold Holding at World Athletics
- Harold Holding at Olympics.com
- Harold Holding at Olympedia
