= Gösta Danielson =

Swedish middle-distance runner

Gösta Danielson (17 November 1889 – 14 February 1960) was a Swedish athlete. He competed in the 1908 Summer Olympics in London. In the 800 metres, Danielson did not finish his initial semifinal heat and did not advance to the final.

Danielson represented Djurgårdens IF.

== Sources ==
- Cook, Theodore Andrea (1908). The Fourth Olympiad, Being the Official Report. London: British Olympic Association.
- De Wael, Herman (2001). "Athletics 1908". Herman's Full Olympians. Archived from the original on 27 September 2006.
- Wudarski, Pawel (1999). "Wyniki Igrzysk Olimpijskich" (in Polish). Archived from the original on 16 February 2009.
