= John Herbert Crawford =

John Herbert Crawford may refer to:

- John Herbert Crawford (politician) (1843–1882), lawyer and politician in New Brunswick, Canada
- Jack Crawford (tennis) or John Herbert Crawford (1908–1991), Australian tennis player

== See also ==
- John Crawford (disambiguation)
