= Francis Sheehan =

American athlete

Francis Patrick Sheehan (31 August 1884 – 29 April 1953) was an American athlete. He competed in the 1908 Summer Olympics in London. In the 800 meters, Sheehan placed last in his initial semifinal heat and did not advance to the final.

== Sources ==
- Cook, Theodore Andrea (1908). The Fourth Olympiad, Being the Official Report. London: British Olympic Association.
- De Wael, Herman (2001). "Athletics 1908". Herman's Full Olympians. Archived from the original on 27 September 2006.
- Wudarski, Pawel (1999). "Wyniki Igrzysk Olimpijskich" (in Polish). Archived from the original on 16 February 2009.
- Francis Sheehan at World Athletics
- Francis Sheehan at Olympedia
