= Frigyes Mezei =

Hungarian athlete

Olympic medal record

Men's athletics
Bronze medal – third place	1908 London	Medley relay

Frigyes Mezei (né Friedrich Wiesner; 26 September 1887, Mór – 22 March 1938, Budapest) was a Hungarian athlete. He competed at the 1908 Summer Olympics in London and at the 1912 Summer Olympics in Stockholm.

Mezei was a member of the Hungarian medley relay team that won a bronze medal. He was the second runner on the squad, running 200 metres. He followed Pál Simon and was followed by József Nagy and Ödön Bodor.

Mezei gave Nagy a six-yard lead over the Swedish team in the first round, but Nagy could not hold on to it. He made the transfer to Bodor while three yards behind. Bodor regained the lead in the race's second half to keep the Hungarians in the competition. In the final, Nagy was able to make the transfer to Bodor while five yards ahead of the German runners, though hopelessly behind the dominant American team. This time, Bodor was passed, and the Hungarians finished third.

In the 100 metres, Mezei placed fourth out of five in his first round heat to be eliminated without advancing to the semifinals. He was also eliminated in his preliminary heat of the 200 metres, placing second of three with a time of 24.0 seconds.

== Sources ==
- Cook, Theodore Andrea (1908). The Fourth Olympiad, Being the Official Report. London: British Olympic Association.
- De Wael, Herman (2001). "Athletics 1908". Herman's Full Olympians. Archived from the original on 27 September 2006.
- Wudarski, Pawel (1999). "Wyniki Igrzysk Olimpijskich" (in Polish). Archived from the original on 16 February 2009.
