= Stylianos Dimitriou =

Greek middle-distance runner

Stylianos Dimitriou (Greek: Στέφανος Δημητρίος; 1887–1966) was a Greek athlete. He competed in the 1908 Summer Olympics in London. He was born in Tripoli.

Dimitriou finished fourth in his semifinal heat of the 1500 metres and did not advance further. In the 800 metres, Dimitrios did not finish his semifinal heat and did not advance to the final in that event either.

== Sources ==
- Cook, Theodore Andrea (1908). The Fourth Olympiad, Being the Official Report. London: British Olympic Association.
- De Wael, Herman (2001). "Athletics 1908". Herman's Full Olympians.
- Wudarski, Pawel (1999). "Wyniki Igrzysk Olimpijskich" (in Polish).
