= Frank Fairbairn Crawford =

British Army officer and cricketer

Frank Crawford
Personal information
- Full name: Frank Fairbairn Crawford
- Born: 17 June 1850; Hastings, Sussex, England
- Died: 16 January 1900 (aged 49); Pietermaritzburg, Colony of Natal
- Batting: Right-handed
- Relatives: Ivo Fairbairn-Crawford (son); John Crawford (brother); Jack Crawford (nephew); Reginald Crawford (nephew); Vivian Crawford (nephew)

Domestic team information
- Years: Team
- 1870–1879: Kent
- 1880–1884: Marylebone Cricket Club (MCC)
- 1886/87–1889/90: Natal

Career statistics
Competition	First-class
Matches	25
Runs scored	579
Batting average	13.78
100s/50s	0/0
Top score	38
Balls bowled	5
Wickets	0
Bowling average	–
5 wickets in innings	–
10 wickets in match	–
Best bowling	–
Catches/stumpings	13/–
- Source: CricInfo, 25 April 2017

Major Frank Fairbairn Crawford (17 June 1850 – 16 January 1900) was a British Army officer who was killed in the Second Boer War. He also played first-class cricket in two countries – in England for Kent County Cricket Club and Marylebone Cricket Club (MCC) and in South Africa for Natal.

== Life and career ==
Crawford was born at Hastings in Sussex in 1850. He made his first-class debut for Kent during the 1870 season, aged 20, when he appeared against Surrey.

He graduated from the Royal Veterinary College in 1873 and enlisted in the army in the same year, joining the Royal Artillery as a veterinarian. In late 1874 he was posted to India where he remained for several years. His army career restricted his cricketing opportunities, although he featured in two first-class matches for Kent during the 1879 season. In total he played 15 times for Kent and made five appearances for Marylebone Cricket Club (MCC) between 1880 and 1884 as well as appearing for MCC in India and South Africa in minor matches. He captained Kent at times in the early 1870s before the club appointed official captains.

After returning from India, Crawford was stationed in South Africa. He played cricket in South Africa, making his debut for Natal in the 1887 Kimberley Tournament before gong on to play in Natal's five first-class matches during the 1889/90 season, the first matches in which the team had been considered as first-class. By the time of the Second Boer War he had reached the rank of Major. He died of dysentery during the war in January 1900 at the military hospital in Pietermaritzburg and is buried at the Fort Napier cemetery.

== Family ==
Crawford was part of a cricketing family. His older brother John and three nephews, Jack, Reginald, and Vivian, all played first-class cricket, with Jack playing Test cricket for England. His father, Andrew, had played for the Gentlemen of England and the family would, on occasions, produce a team of 11 Crawfords.

He married twice, with his first wife, Marianne Ada Robinson, dying after less than a year of their marriage. He had at least two children with his second wife: Loris Muriel Natalie (later Callingham), who died in the torpedoing of RMS Leinster in 1918, and Ivo Frank Fairbairn, who adopted the surname Fairbairn-Crawford and represented Great Britain in athletics at the 1908 Summer Olympics.

== See also ==
- List of cricketers who were killed during military service

== Bibliography ==
- Carlaw, Derek (2020). Kent County Cricketers, A to Z: Part One (1806–1914) (PDF). Cardiff: ACS.
