= Otto Trieloff =

German sprinter

Olympic medal record

Men's athletics

Representing Germany
Silver medal – second place	1908 London	Medley relay

Otto Paul Trieloff (17 November 1885 – 6 July 1967) was a German athlete. He competed at the 1908 Summer Olympics in London. He was born in Duisburg and died in Essen-Rüttenscheid.

Trieloff was a member of the silver medal German medley relay team. He was the third runner on the squad, running 400 metres. He followed Arthur Hoffmann and Hans Eicke, each of whom ran 200 metres, and was followed by Hanns Braun, who ran the 800.

The team dominated the first round, easily defeating the Dutch team with a time of 3:43.2. In the final, though, the Germans could not match the American team. Trieloff was in third place when he started his leg and finished five yards behind the second-place Hungarian team. Braun was able to move into second place at the very end of the race, however, giving Trieloff a silver medal.

Trieloff also competed in the 400 metres event, finishing second in his first round heat and not advancing to the final.

== Sources ==
- Cook, Theodore Andrea (1908). The Fourth Olympiad, Being the Official Report. London: British Olympic Association.
- De Wael, Herman (2001). "Athletics 1908". Herman's Full Olympians. Archived from the original on 27 September 2006.
- Wudarski, Pawel (1999). "Wyniki Igrzysk Olimpijskich" (in Polish).
