= Lloyd Jones (athlete) =

American athlete

Lloyd Peniston Jones (September 12, 1884 – May 1, 1971) was an American athlete. He competed in the 1908 Summer Olympics in London. In the 800 metres, Jones finished third in his semifinal heat and did not advance to the final. He was born in Germantown, Pennsylvania and died in Bermuda.

== Sources ==
- Cook, Theodore Andrea (1908). The Fourth Olympiad, Being the Official Report. London: British Olympic Association.
- De Wael, Herman (2001). "Athletics 1908". Herman's Full Olympians.
- Wudarski, Pawel (1999). "Wyniki Igrzysk Olimpijskich" (in Polish).
- Lloyd Jones' profile at Sports Reference.com
- Lloyd Jones at World Athletics
- Lloyd Jones at Tilastopaja (registration required)
- Lloyd Jones at Olympedia
