= József Nagy (athlete) =

Hungarian athlete

Olympic medal record

Men's athletics
Bronze medal – third place	1908 London	Medley relay

József Nagy (27 January 1884 – 25 October 1952) was a Hungarian athlete. He was born Sárkeresztúr and competed at the 1908 Summer Olympics in London.

== Olympics ==
Nagy was a member of the Hungarian medley relay team that won a bronze medal. He was the third runner on the squad, running 400 metres. He followed Pál Simon and Frigyes Wiesner and was followed by Ödön Bodor. Nagy had a six-yard lead over the Swedish team in the first round but could not hold on to it. He made the transfer to Bodor while three yards behind. Bodor regained the lead in the second half of the race to keep the Hungarians in the competition. In the final, Nagy was able to make the transfer to Bodor while five yards ahead of the German runners, though behind the American team. This time, Bodor was passed, and the Hungarians finished third.

Nagy also competed in the 400, 800, and 1,500 metre races but did not advance to the final in any of them. He placed second, fourth, and second in his first round heats, respectively.

== Sources ==
- Cook, Theodore Andrea (1908). The Fourth Olympiad, Being the Official Report. London: British Olympic Association.
- De Wael, Herman (2001). "Athletics 1908". Herman's Full Olympians. Archived from the original on 27 September 2006.
- Wudarski, Pawel (1999). "Wyniki Igrzysk Olimpijskich" (in Polish). Archived from the original on June 19, 2007.
