= Reginald Crawford (cricketer) =

English cricketer (1882–1945)

Personal information
- Full name: Reginald Trevor Crawford
- Born: 11 June 1882; Leicester, Leicestershire, England
- Died: 15 November 1945 (aged 63); Swiss Cottage, London, England
- Batting: Right-handed
- Bowling: Right-arm fast-medium
- Role: All-rounder
- Relatives: JC Crawford (father); JN Crawford (brother); VFS Crawford (brother); FF Crawford (uncle)

Domestic team information
- Years: Team
- 1901–1911: Leicestershire
- First-class debut: 13 May 1901 Leicestershire v Surrey
- Last First-class: 1 July 1911 H. D. G. Leveson Gower's XI v Oxford University

Career statistics
| Competition | First-class |
|---|---|
| Matches | 112 |
| Runs scored | 3,190 |
| Batting average | 18.33 |
| 100s/50s | 0/13 |
| Top score | 99* |
| Balls bowled | 11,423 |
| Wickets | 221 |
| Bowling average | 25.72 |
| 5 wickets in innings | 15 |
| 10 wickets in match | 5 |
| Best bowling | 7/71 |
| Catches/stumpings | 100/– |
- Source: CricketArchive, 20 August 2013

Reginald Trevor Crawford (11 June 1882 – 15 November 1945) was an English cricketer who played as a right-handed batsman and a right-arm fast-medium bowler in first-class cricket between 1901 and 1911. He played mainly for Leicestershire from 1901 to 1907, returning for a single match in both 1910 and 1911, and also played for amateur teams. He was born in Leicester and died at Swiss Cottage, London. He was the brother of the England Test cricketer Jack Crawford and of the Surrey and Leicestershire first-class cricketer Vivian Crawford.

== Early career and successes ==
Though born in Leicester, Crawford was brought up in Surrey where his father had become chaplain at the Cane Hill mental hospital at Coulsdon. He played amateur cricket in Surrey and then Minor Counties cricket for Surrey's second team in 1900.

With Surrey having strength in both bowling and batting at this time, Crawford moved in 1901 to play first-class cricket for Leicestershire, having a birth qualification for the team. He became pretty much a regular in the first team as a teenager, featuring in 15 county games in his first season, though his figures were not impressive, with only 11 first-class wickets and a batting average of 13.96.

The 1902 season was his best in first-class cricket. He made 852 runs at an average of 25.05 and took 40 wickets at 23.70. In late June and aged just 20, as the only amateur in the team, he was captain of what The Times referred to as "a scratch side playing under the title of 'An England Eleven'" in a "hastily-arranged" game with the Australian touring team at Bradford, put together because of the late postponement of the coronation of King Edward VII. The match, fairly easily won by the Australians, was notable for the bowling performance of Herbert Knutton, who had played one first-class match for Warwickshire in 1894 without taking a wicket and this time took nine Australian first-innings wickets for 100 runs, adding a tenth when the touring team needed just 42 to win; Knutton never played first-class cricket again. Crawford distinguished himself in the second England XI innings with a score of 90, his highest first-class score to date, "a fine piece of hitting (which) saved the scratch side from the ignominy of an innings defeat", The Times reported.

A month later, Crawford improved on his best score: in the match against Worcestershire at Aylestone Road cricket ground, Leicester, he and the bowler William Odell came together with Leicestershire at 61 for eight wickets and proceeded to put on 160 for the ninth wicket. The partnership remains, 111 years on, Leicestershire's best in first-class cricket for the ninth wicket and is 75 years older than any of the county's other first-class partnership records. Crawford was left unbeaten on 99 when first Odell was run out and then, one run later, the No 11 batsman, Arthur Emmett, was also run out, without scoring. Crawford never achieved a century in first-class cricket; the 99 not out remained his best score.

== Later cricket career ==
In fact, Crawford's cricket career did not really develop after 1902. He played regularly again for Leicestershire in 1903, when his older brother Vivian (usually known as "Frank"), joined the team and also acted as secretary to the county cricket club, but although Reginald managed 40 wickets again his aggregate of runs fell to 461 and his average to just 12.13; his highest score for the season was only 35. His appearances for Leicestershire became more intermittent from 1904 onwards, though he had occasional days of success with both bat and ball through to 1907. For example, in 1906, he made an unbeaten 84 in a successful rearguard action in the match against Warwickshire after Leicestershire had been forced to follow on.

But all of his better bowling performances came later in his cricket career when he was playing only a few matches each season, and mainly for ad hoc amateur teams. In two matches in 1907 for H. D. G. Leveson Gower's XI in first-class games against university teams he took 21 wickets in two games: he took five for 69 and five for 77 against Oxford University and followed that with four for 77 and seven for 71 against Cambridge. The second innings figures against Cambridge University proved to be the best of his first-class career. His final two matches in first-class cricket in 1911 were for Leveson Gower's team against the universities, this time the matches both being played at Eastbourne and within the space of a week; Crawford took six for 48 and four for 43 in the first of them against Cambridge University, and then two for 101 and six for 21 in the second, against Oxford.

Crawford's death was reported in the 1946 edition of Wisden Cricketers' Almanack as having been "after a long illness".
