= Vivian Crawford =

English cricketer (1879–1922)

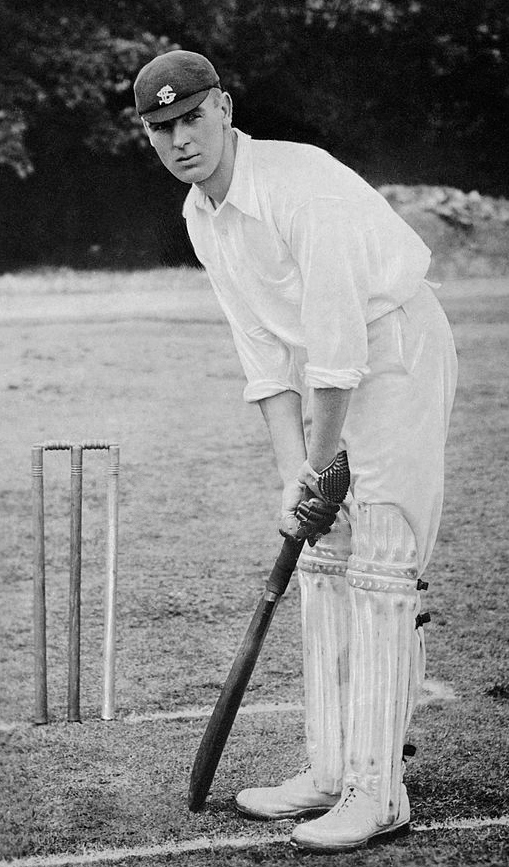
- Crawford in 1904

Personal information
- Full name: Vivian Frank Shergold Crawford
- Born: 11 April 1879; Leicester, Leicestershire, England
- Died: 21 August 1922 (aged 43); Merton, London, England
- Batting: Right-handed
- Bowling: Right-arm fast
- Role: Batsman
- Relatives: JC Crawford (father); JN Crawford (brother); RT Crawford (brother); FF Crawford (uncle)

Domestic team information
- Years: Team
- 1896–1902: Surrey
- 1903–1910: Leicestershire
- First-class debut: 22 June 1896 Surrey v Oxford University
- Last First-class: 3 September 1910 Leicestershire v Surrey

Career statistics
Competition	First-class
Matches	293
Runs scored	11,909
Batting average	26.64
100s/50s	16/51
Top score	172*
Balls bowled	1,435
Wickets	17
Bowling average	51.47
5 wickets in innings	0
10 wickets in match	0
Best bowling	3/14
Catches/stumpings	262/–
- Source: CricketArchive, 20 August 2013

Vivian Frank Shergold Crawford (11 April 1879 – 21 August 1922) was an English cricketer who played as a right-handed batsman and an occasional right-arm fast bowler in first-class cricket for Surrey and Leicestershire between 1896 and 1910. He also played for many amateur teams. He was born in Leicester and died at Merton, Surrey. He was the brother of the England Test cricketer Jack Crawford and of the Leicestershire first-class cricketer Reginald Crawford.

During his lifetime, he was generally referred to as "Frank Crawford".

== Early cricket and Surrey ==
Though born in Leicester, Crawford was brought up in Surrey where his father had become chaplain at the Cane Hill mental hospital at Coulsdon. He was an outstanding schoolboy cricketer at Whitgift School, and played for Surrey in 1896 as a 17-year-old while still at school. At school and in early club cricket, according to a tribute to him written in the 1923 Wisden Cricketers' Almanack by his Surrey colleague Digby Jephson, he was regarded primarily as a fast bowler, and he took eight wickets in an innings for 35 runs against the full Surrey team in a minor match in 1895. The following year, according to the same source, he hit 218 before lunch in a match for Surrey's Young Amateurs team against the Young Professionals: "the sort of innings many of us would tramp long, weary miles to see," Jephson wrote.

Crawford's second first-class game after his debut in 1896 was a Gentlemen v Players match at Hastings at the end of the 1897 season when his captain was W. G. Grace. In 1898 and 1899, he appeared in around half of Surrey's first-class games and in the 1899 match against Somerset in which Surrey amassed a total of 811, he scored his first century with an innings of 129, although his effort was somewhat overshadowed by Bobby Abel's 357 not out, where the diminutive opening batsman carried his bat.

Crawford played regularly for Surrey in only three seasons, from 1900 to 1902, while the team was captained by Jephson. Batting largely in the lower middle order, he was renowned for fast scoring, but Jephson wrote that "he was essentially a scientific hitter not a slogger". He added: "He was strictly orthodox in all his methods of attack or defence, and the straightness of his bat was a thing to marvel at... He will go down to posterity as one of the greatest straight drivers the game has known."

He scored more than 1,000 runs in each of the three seasons he was a regular at Surrey, with a best aggregate of 1511 runs at an average of 32.14 in 1901, when he captained the team in two games. His highest innings for Surrey was also in 1901: he scored 159 against Worcestershire at The Oval. Jephson's reminiscence in the 1923 Wisden recalled another innings in that season, in which Crawford hit flagstaffs on the two towers of the football pavilion at the Park Avenue ground, Bradford with straight drives for six. The match against Yorkshire was the first one in which Crawford captained Surrey.

After the 1901 English cricket season, Crawford joined other amateurs on a tour to North America captained by Bernard Bosanquet; two of the matches against the Philadelphian cricket team were designated as first-class games.

In 1902, Crawford had his nearest brush with Test selection: he was picked for "An England XI" to play the Australian touring team in a game at Eastbourne, but he did not then win further selection for the Tests that summer. Towards the end of the season, Jephson was injured and Crawford captained Surrey in eight matches; his final match for the team was against Leicestershire where the opposition included his brother Reginald.

== Leicestershire and later cricket ==
In March 1903, Crawford was appointed as secretary of Leicestershire County Cricket Club. This was often a ploy used by the poorer county clubs to recruit talented cricketers of limited means: the secretarial duties were often light and mainly done by volunteers, but employment as secretary meant that a player could maintain amateur status. In Crawford's case, there were other considerations, as he had been born in Leicester and his younger brother was already a member of the team. Amateur status meant that he was available to captain the team in the absence of the regular captain, Charles de Trafford, and he did so several times in his first season with the county, 1903, and more than 30 times until his career ended in 1910. He remained as secretary to the club until the end of the 1907 season.

Crawford maintained consistent batting form across his eight seasons with Leicestershire, although as the county usually played fewer matches than Surrey had done, he passed 1,000 runs in a season only in 1908 and 1909, after he had given up the secretaryship. His best year was 1908, when he made 1416 runs at an average of 32.93 and increased his highest score to 170 in an innings that took just 160 minutes and included 24 fours and four sixes against Hampshire. In 1909, he improved on that again with an innings of 172 not out against Surrey in which he made his runs out of 226 put on while he was at the wicket in just over three hours. He was less successful in 1910 and left first-class cricket at the end of the season.

While at Leicestershire, Crawford also played in several other first-class matches for amateur teams, including another appearance for an "England XI" against the Australian touring team at Blackpool in which he appeared alongside his younger brother, Jack, for the only time in his career. He appeared for a second time in a Gentlemen v Players game, this time at The Oval, in his final season of 1910.

== After cricket ==
At the end of the 1910 season, Crawford left England for Ceylon. He played non-first-class cricket for the Europeans team both in Sri Lanka and on tour in Burma (Myanmar), and played for the Ceylon team in matches against the MCC team on its way to Australia in 1911–12 and the Australian team on its way to England for the 1912 series.

In the First World War he served with the East Surrey Regiment; he is recorded in the London Gazette as having relinquished his commission as a temporary lieutenant on 18 January 1919 "on account of ill-health contracted on active service". His obituary in The Times noted that he had died of pneumonia after many years of illness brought about through his war service.
