= Jack Randall Crawford =

American dramatist

Jack Randall Crawford (April 1, 1878 in Washington, DC–1968) was an author of novels (many unpublished), plays, and literary criticism and a professor of English at Yale University; he is perhaps best known for his 1922 autobiographical novel I Walked in Arden and his 1928 nonfiction What to Read in English Literature.

== Biography ==
Crawford received his bachelor's degree from Princeton University in 1901. He became an instructor in English at Yale University and also Director of Dramatics at Dartmouth College. He was a professor of English at Yale University from 1909 to 1946 and then professor emeritus from 1946 until his death in 1968. In addition to his novels, plays, and literary criticism, he wrote an autobiography and edited several of Shakespeare's plays for Yale University Press.

== Nonfiction ==
- with Mary Porter Beegle: Beegle, Mary Porter; Crawford, Jack Randall (1916). Community drama and pageantry.
- What to read in English literature. 1928.

== Novels ==
- I walked in Arden. Knopf. 1922.

== Plays ==
- Lovely Peggy: a play in three acts based on the love romance of Margaret Woffington and David Garrick. Yale university press. 1911.
- Robin of Sherwood: a comedy in three acts and four scenes. Yale university press. 1912.
