= Irving Parkes =

Canadian athlete

Robert Irving Parkes (July 8, 1886 in Toronto, Ontario, Canada – September 23, 1964 in Manhattan, New York City) was a Canadian athlete. He competed in the 1908 Summer Olympics in London.

Parkes placed third in his semifinal heat of the 800 metres, not advancing to the final. He was also part of the Canadian 4 x 400 metres relay, which placed 3rd in their heat and did not advance to the final.

In 1908, only the winners of the heats advanced to the final race. Parkes had the unfortunate draw to run in the second semifinal with the eventual champion and world record setter Mel Sheppard, who dominated the race. His personal record in the 800 metres was 1.57.1 and could have been sufficient to qualify him to the final.

As a boy, he played hockey, lacrosse, basketball, tennis and track. He set the Canadian record for the 880, which stood for 36 years. In later years, Parkes became a golfer and enjoyed fishing. Parkes worked as art director for an advertising agency, McCann Erickson, in NYC.

== Sources ==
- Cook, Theodore Andrea (1908). The Fourth Olympiad, Being the Official Report. London: British Olympic Association.
- De Wael, Herman (2001). "Athletics 1908". Herman's Full Olympians. Archived from the original on 27 September 2006.
- Wudarski, Pawel (1999). "Wyniki Igrzysk Olimpijskich" (in Polish). Archived from the original on 16 February 2009.
