= George Morphy =

British athlete

Personal information
- Nationality: Irish
- Born: 20 April 1884 Dublin, Ireland
- Died: 14 April 1946 (aged 61) Burwash, England

Sport
- Sport: Athletics
- Event: middle-distance
- Club: Dublin University AC

George Newcomen Morphy (20 April 1884 – 14 April 1946) was an Irish solicitor and athlete, notable for his success in running and cycling. He competed for Great Britain at the 1908 Summer Olympics.

== Biography ==
Morphy was born in Dublin, Ireland, and educated at Portora Royal School, Enniskillen before entering Trinity College, Dublin in 1902, graduating in 1907 with a Bachelor of Arts (BA) degree. As a student, he specialised in running the 440 yards, 880 yards and one mile races. In 1905, he set an Irish record in cycle racing, with a time of 1:56.8 in the 880 yards dash.

He then became a solicitor but continued his athletic career. Morphy represented Great Britain at the 1908 Summer Olympics in London. In the 800 metres, Morphy finished third in his semifinal heat and did not advance to the final. He won seven national titles in Irish athletics competitions between 1908 and 1910.

During World War I, Morphy served in the Royal Army Service Corps from 1914 to 1920, rising to the rank of captain.

He died in Burwash, East Sussex.

== Sources ==
- Cook, Theodore Andrea (1908). The Fourth Olympiad, Being the Official Report. London: British Olympic Association.
- De Wael, Herman (2001). "Athletics 1908". Herman's Full Olympians. Archived from the original on 27 September 2006.
- Wudarski, Pawel (1999). "Wyniki Igrzysk Olimpijskich" (in Polish). Archived from the original on 16 February 2009.
- Evans, Hilary; Gjerde, Arild; Heijmans, Jeroen; Mallon, Bill; et al. "George Morphy". Olympics at Sports-Reference.com. Sports Reference LLC. Archived from the original on 18 December 2012.
