= John Halstead =

American middle-distance runner

John Preston Halstead, born in Scranton, Pennsylvania(August 15, 1886 - November 15, 1951), was an American athlete. At the Olympic trials held at Franklin Field, Philadelphia, in June 1908, he established the North American record for the 1500 meters of 4:01.2, besting the then Olympic record of 4:05.4. At the Summer Olympics held in London in July 1908, owing to the British system of a blind draw for the preliminary heats, he was paired in the 2nd heat with America's other best miler, Mel Sheppard. Nauseated by an upset stomach just before the heat, Halstead was unable to produce his customary final sprint and lost the heat by a yard to Sheppard in a time of 4:05, thus disqualifying him from the finals. Sheppard went on to win the gold in a time of 4:03.4. Halstead upheld the American team's reputation for good sportsmanship by never uttering a word of complaint about the British system of a blind draw.

In the 800 metres, held a week later, Halstead won his first round heat with a time of 2:01.4. He was placed sixth in the final.

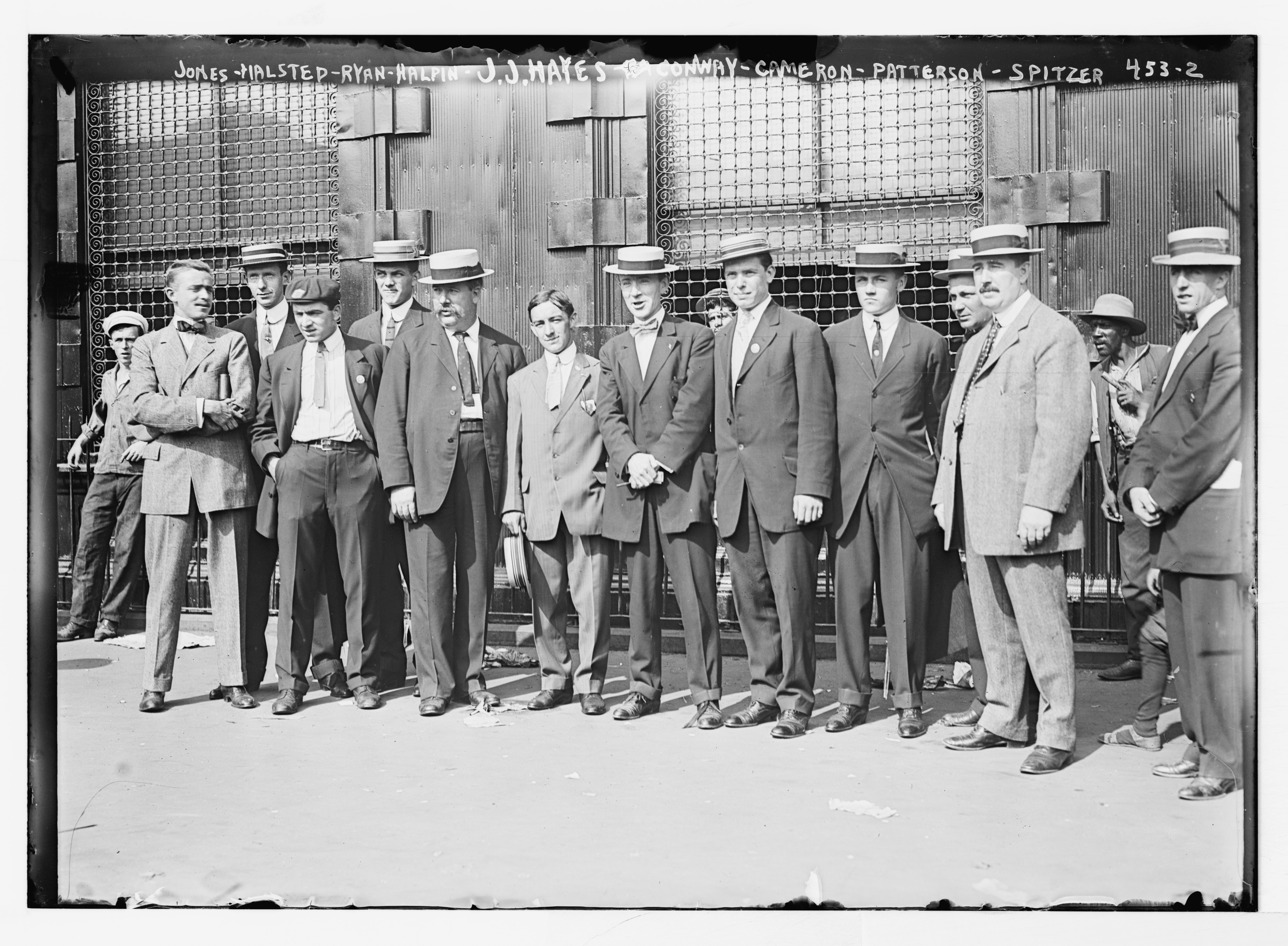

He graduated from Cornell University in the same year with a degree in mechanical engineering. During the latter part of 1908 and 1909, he was one of the engineers who worked on the construction of the Pennsylvania Railroad Station in New York City. He held the rank of major in World War I. He was the commanding officer of the Field Training Battalion at the Field Artillery Officers' Central Training School, Camp Zachary Taylor, Louisville, Kentucky. He was married on August 17, 1922, to Frances Lewis Underwood at Hutchinson, Kansas. He died on November 15, 1951, in Buffalo, New York. His ashes are buried in the Rome (New York) Cemetery.

== Sources ==
- Cook, Theodore Andrea (1908). The Fourth Olympiad, Being the Official Report. London: British Olympic Association.
- De Wael, Herman (2001). "Athletics 1908". Herman's Full Olympians. Archived from the original on 27 September 2006.
- Wudarski, Pawel (1999). "Wyniki Igrzysk Olimpijskich" (in Polish). Archived from the original on 14 October 2008.
- Halstead, John P. (1999) The Life and Ancestry of John Preston Halstead 1886-1951. Orchard Park, NY
