= John Crawford (silversmith) =

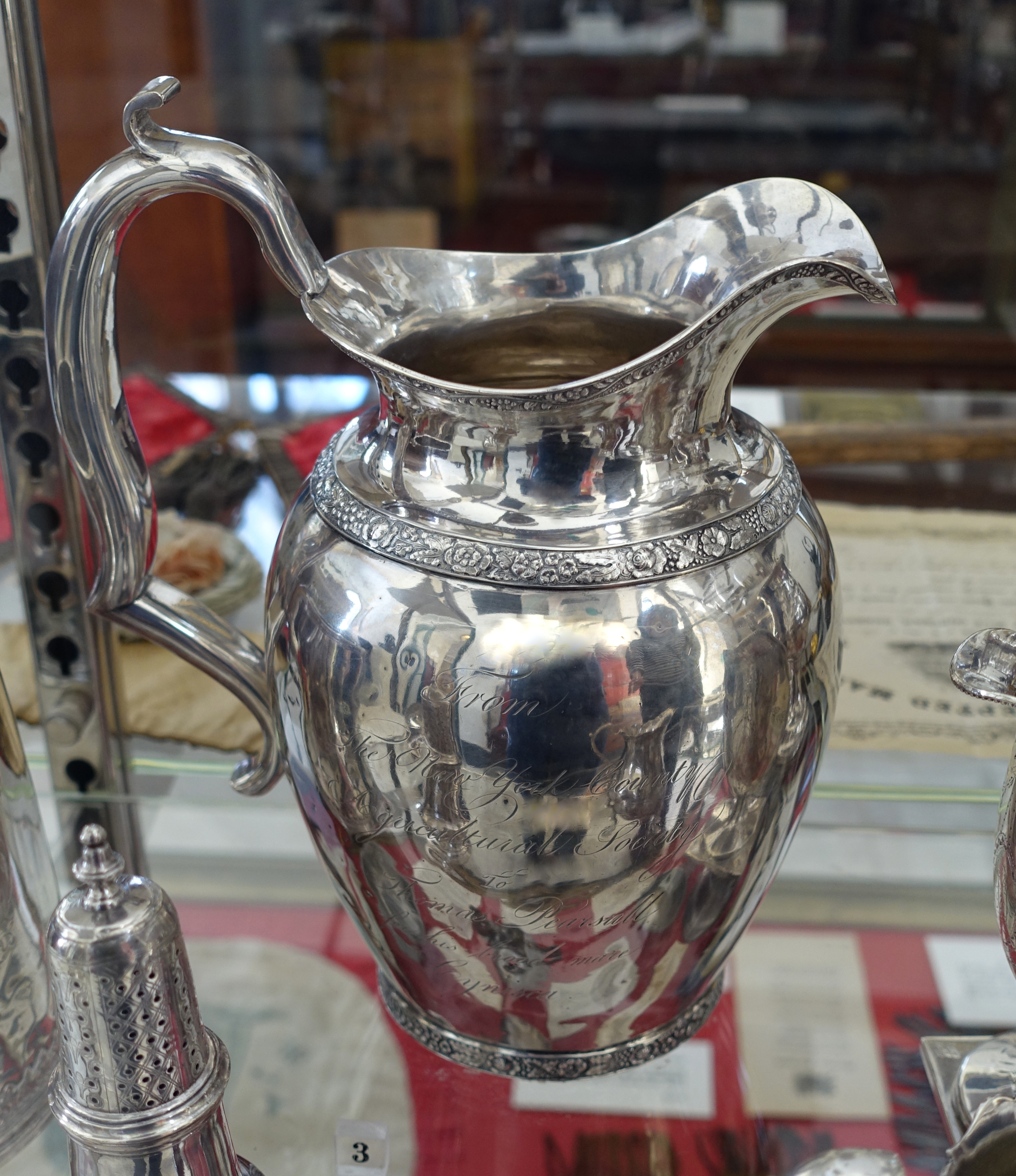
Presentation pitcher by John Crawford, New York City, c. 1820

John Crawford (dates unknown) was an American silversmith, active in New York City from 1815 to 1836, and in Philadelphia from 1837 to 1843.
