= Ödön Bodor =

Hungarian athlete

Olympic medal record

Men's athletics
Bronze medal – third place	1908 London	Medley relay

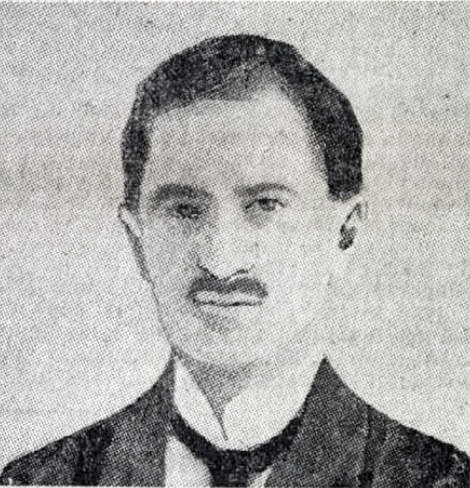

Ödön Bodor (né Ödön Krausz; 24 October 1882 – 22 January 1927) was a Hungarian athlete. He competed at the 1908 Summer Olympics in London and at the 1912 Summer Olympics in Stockholm. He was Jewish.

== Career ==
Bodor was born in Kapuvár. He was a member of the 1908 bronze medal medley relay team. Bodor ran the final 800 metres of the 1,600 metre race, following Pál Simon, Frigyes Wiesner, and József Nagy. In the first round, Bodor began his leg three yards behind the Swedish team and had to pass the other runner just to remain in competition. The time for the team in that round was 3:32.6. The final, however, saw a reversal of fortune. Bodor began with a five-yard lead over the Germans, however. He could not hold on to that lead and finished inches behind the Germans at 3:32.5 to his opponents' 3:32.4 to receive a bronze rather than a silver.

In the 800 metres, Bodor won his first round heat with a time of 1:58.6 to defeat a number of highly regarded athletes, including defending champion James Lightbody. Bodor was one of four runners to beat Lightbody's record of 1:56.0 in the final, though he was the slowest of the four at 1:55.4. Bodor also competed in the 1500 metres, although he did not advance past the first round.

Bodor also played football. A midfielder, starting his career in 1900 at Újpesti FC. He died in Budapest in 1927.

== See also ==
- List of select Jewish track and field athletes
