= John Crawford (cricketer) =

English cricketer and clergyman

The Reverend John Charles Crawford (29 May 1849 – 21 February 1935), known as Parson Crawford, was an English clergyman and amateur cricketer. He played for Kent County Cricket Club between 1872 and 1877.

== Life ==
He was born in Hastings in Sussex in 1849, the son of Andrew Crawford. His father had played for the Gentlemen of England and his brother, Frank Fairbairn Crawford, also played first-class cricket for Kent.

Crawford attended University College, Oxford, where he matriculated in 1868, aged 18; he graduated B.A. and then M.A. in 1875. He was the chaplain to Cane Hill Hospital in Surrey for 36 years from 1883 until he retired in 1919. He was an honorary curate at St Mary's Church in Merton after his retirement and died at Wimbledon Chase in Surrey in 1935 aged 85. He is buried in the churchyard at St Mary's, Merton.

== Cricketer ==
Crawford made his first-class cricket debut for WG Grace's XI in 1871 against Kent before going on to play 10 times for Kent. He also played for a large number of minor teams, including Leicestershire and Gentlemen's teams in Kent, Hertfordshire and Surrey and for Surrey's Second XI between 1891 and 1894. Crawford was a fast bowler and powerful batsman who was "large framed and powerfully built".

Three of Crawford's sons were known as cricketers: Jack for Surrey and England; Reginald for Leicestershire; and Vivian for both Surrey and Leicestershire. His Wisden obituary notes that he "loved the game so much that all his children played from an early age" and that an entire team of Crawford's played on occasion, including at least two of his daughters.

== Bibliography ==
- Carlaw, Derek (2020). Kent County Cricketers, A to Z: Part One (1806–1914) (PDF). Cardiff: ACS.
