= Jack Crawford (cricketer) =

English cricketer

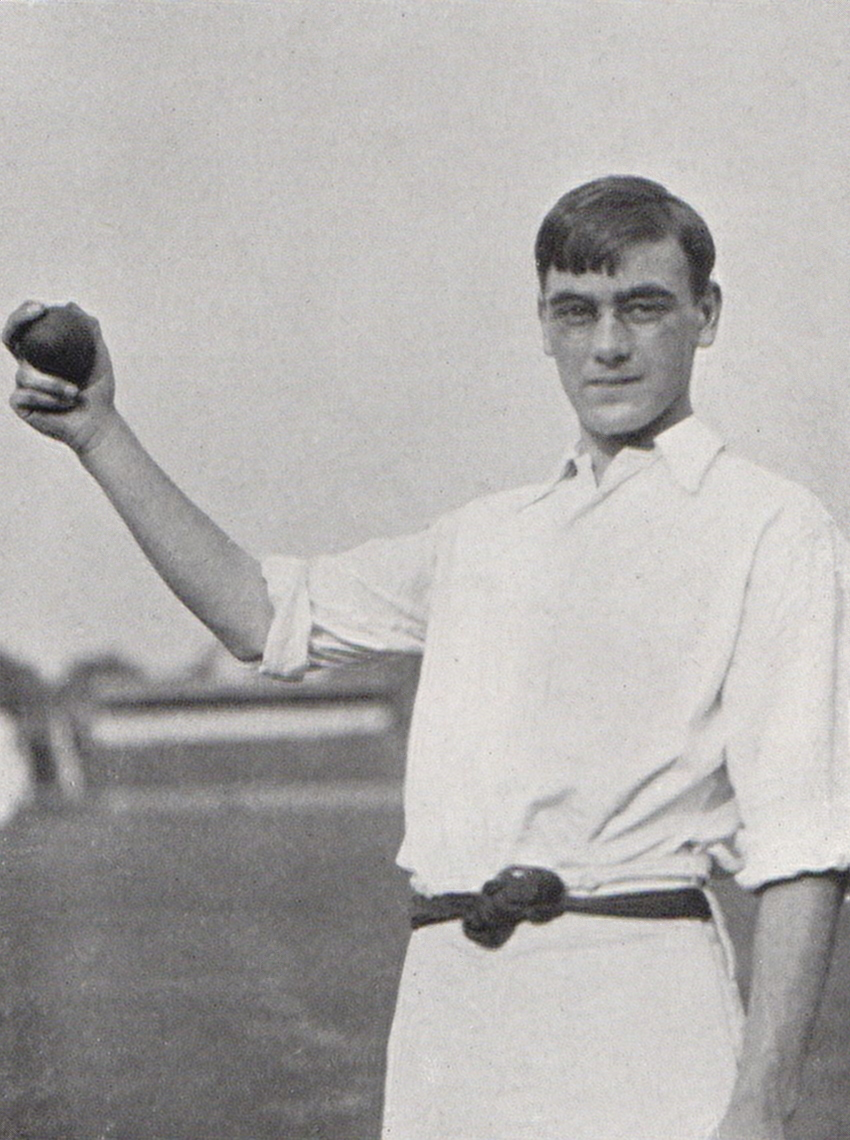
- Jack Crawford in 1906

Personal information
- Full name: John Neville Crawford
- Born: 1 December 1886; Cane Hill, Surrey, England
- Died: 2 May 1963 (aged 76); Epsom, Surrey, England
- Batting: Right-handed
- Bowling: Right-arm medium Right-arm off spin
- Role: All-rounder

International information
- National side: England
- Test debut (cap 146): 2 January 1906 v South Africa
- Last Test: 27 February 1908 v Australia

Domestic team information
- Years: Team
- 1904–1909: Surrey
- 1909/10–1913/14: South Australia
- 1914/15: Otago
- 1917/18: Wellington
- 1919–1921: Surrey

Career statistics
Competition	Test	First-class
Matches	12	210
Runs scored	469	9,488
Batting average	22.33	32.60
100s/50s	0/2	15/43
Top score	74	232
Balls bowled	2,203	35,423
Wickets	39	815
Bowling average	29.48	20.66
5 wickets in innings	3	57
10 wickets in match	0	12
Best bowling	5/48	8/24
Catches/stumpings	13/–	162/–
- Source: CricketArchive, 4 December 2010

John Neville Crawford (1 December 1886 – 2 May 1963) was an English first-class cricketer who played mainly for Surrey County Cricket Club and South Australia. An amateur, he played as an all-rounder. As a right-handed batsman, Crawford had a reputation for scoring quickly and hitting powerful shots. He bowled medium-paced off spin and was noted for his accuracy and his ability to make the ball turn sharply from the pitch. Unusually for a first-class cricketer, Crawford wore spectacles while playing.

Crawford established a reputation as an outstanding cricketer while still a schoolboy. He played Test cricket for England before he was 20 years old, and successfully toured Australia with the Marylebone Cricket Club (MCC) in 1907–08. He played only 12 matches for England, although critics believed he had a great future in the sport and was a potential future England captain. In two successive English seasons, he completed the double of 1,000 runs and 100 wickets in first-class games.

A dispute over the composition of Surrey's team chosen to play a high-profile game in 1909, after several professional players were omitted for disciplinary reasons, led to an increasingly bitter disagreement between Crawford and the Surrey authorities. Crawford was told he had no future with the club, and moved to Australia. There, he worked as a teacher and continued his cricket career with South Australia. This arrangement had a controversial end, when he clashed with the South Australian Cricket Association over money and moved to New Zealand to play for Otago.

That relationship also ended badly, and he left Otago before being conscripted into the New Zealand armed forces near the end of the First World War. When he was demobilised, he returned to England and made his peace with Surrey. He played a handful of games between 1919 and 1921 but faded out of first-class cricket to pursue a career in industry. In all first-class cricket, Crawford scored 9,488 runs at an average of 32.60 and took 815 wickets at an average of 20.66. Although he continued to play cricket at a lower level, the remainder of Crawford's life passed in relative obscurity.

== Early life and career ==
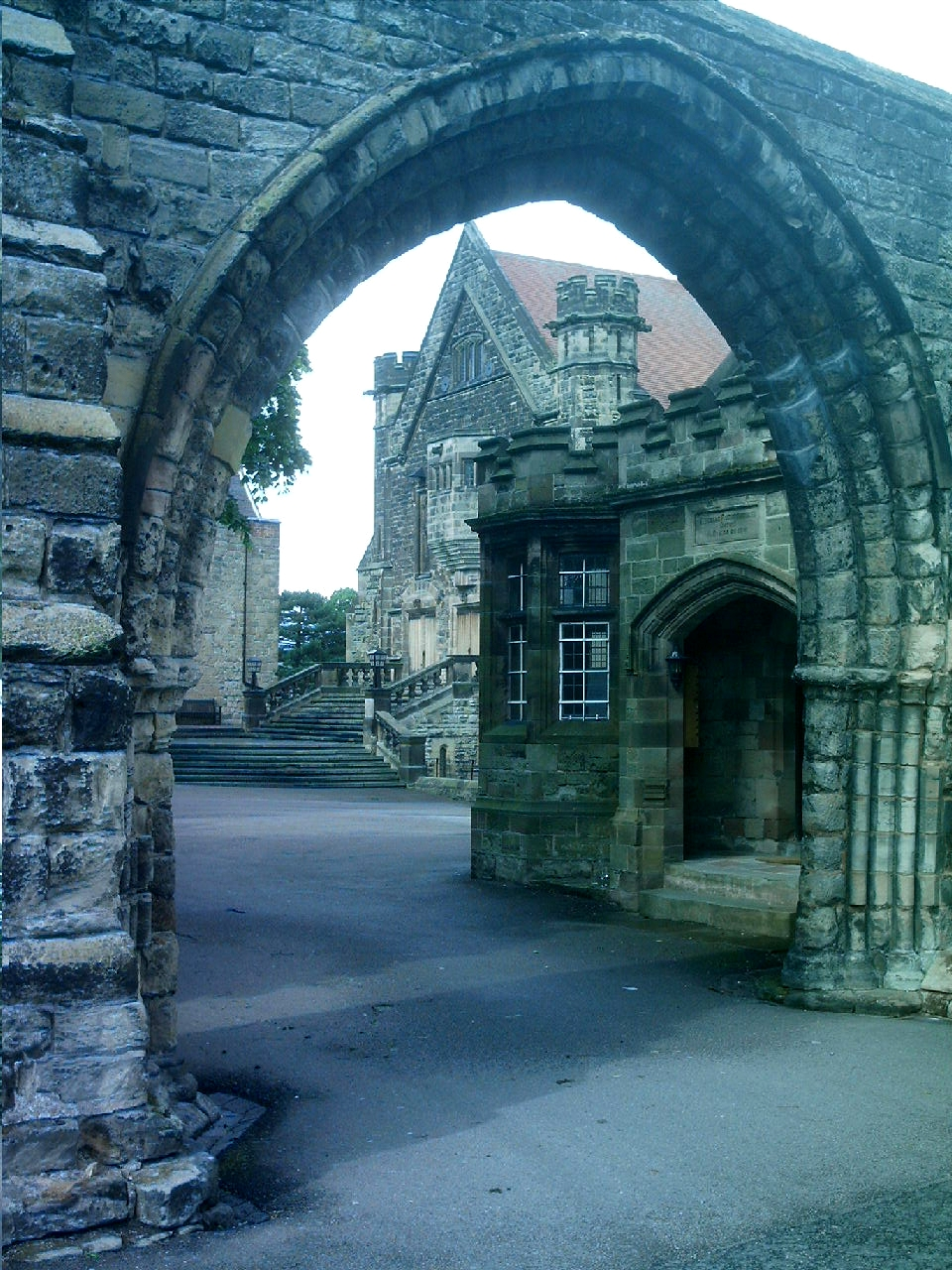
Repton School, where Crawford established his reputation as a cricketer

Jack Crawford was born on 1 December 1886 at Cane Hill, Coulsdon, Surrey, the youngest of three sons of the Rev John Charles Crawford and his wife Alice; the couple also had three daughters. Crawford senior was the chaplain at the recently opened Cane Hill Asylum, in the grounds of which Crawford was born. He grew up in a cricketing environment. His father and uncle, Frank Crawford, played first-class cricket for Kent; his brothers Vivian and Reginald were also first-class cricketers. The whole family played cricket and encouraged Crawford from a young age, and from the age of eleven he regularly played with adults.

After attending Glengrove School in Eastbourne, Crawford went to St Winifred's School in Henley-on-Thames where, in his two years in the cricket team, he scored 2,093 runs and took 366 wickets. In 1902, Crawford moved to Repton School. Reaching the cricket team in his first year, he remained in the eleven until he left the school in 1905. His impact was considerable. A 1906 report in Wisden Cricketers' Almanack rated him as one of the best three schoolboy cricketers in the previous 40 years, matched only by A. G. Steel and Stanley Jackson. Cricket historians similarly praised his cricket at Repton. Benny Green notes that his prolific achievements "created ... chaos among schoolboy cricketers." Gerald Brodribb describes him as "probably the best ever" schoolboy cricketer.

By 1904, Crawford dominated the Repton team. He scored 759 runs and his 75 wickets were more than the combined total of all the other bowlers in the team. He was particularly effective in the school's most important fixtures. The report in Wisden described him as possibly the best amateur bowler in England that year: he bowled medium-paced off spin, although he varied the speed of his delivery from slow to fast. Surrey County Cricket Club took an interest in Crawford almost immediately, calling him to a trial in 1903. Following his achievements in 1904, he was invited to play for the county. The county club was in the midst of a spell of uncertainty; several men captained the team, but only for a handful of matches each. The composition of the team continually changed, and the team performed poorly, causing unrest among supporters accustomed to success. Crawford was just one of many players brought in as an experiment, albeit one of the most successful. He made his first-class debut against Kent. Taking three wickets and top-scoring in Surrey's first innings with 54, Crawford did well enough to retain his place for another seven games, and was praised in the press for his performances. Against Gloucestershire, he took seven wickets for 43 runs in the second innings, and a total of ten wickets in the match. In the season as a whole he took 44 first-class wickets at an average of 16.93 to top the county's bowling averages, and scored 229 runs at an average of 16.35.

Although hampered by injuries during the 1905 season for Repton, his last at the school, Crawford scored 766 runs with a batting average of 85. In the five matches in which he was fit to bowl he took 55 wickets at an average under 13. In the August holidays, he returned to play for Surrey. (Note: He appeared in one early-season game for Surrey against the "Gentlemen of England", before the school season began. The county also wrote to Repton asking if Crawford could play during term-time, but the school refused permission.) In his second game, he took seven for 90 against Yorkshire and in his third, he scored his maiden first-class century—119 not out against Derbyshire—to become the youngest centurion for the county, a record that was not broken until 2013. Later, he took eight for 24 against Northamptonshire and scored 142 not out against Leicestershire. At the end of the season, he played in the Hastings Festival, appearing in several representative games for teams representing the South of England and played for the Rest of England against the County Champions Yorkshire. Crawford finished second in Surrey's batting averages for 1905; in all first-class games he scored 543 runs at an average of 33.93 and took 47 wickets at an average of 18.46. As the season ended, he was invited by the Marylebone Cricket Club (MCC) to join their tour of South Africa that winter.

== International cricketer ==
=== Tour to South Africa ===
Having finished his school career, Crawford joined the first MCC tour of South Africa in the 1905–06 season. (Note: Throughout Crawford's career, the MCC organised and administered English cricket. By the time of this tour, official English touring teams played under the name, colours and badge of the MCC and were only styled "England" during Test matches.) The team was not particularly strong—before the tour, critics judged it to possess the equivalent strength of a moderate county team. The MCC was criticised by the press both in England and in South Africa for omitting many of the strongest players. As the youngest member of the team, Crawford was given the traditional role of writing press reports to be sent back home during the tour. When the team played in Worcester during the tour, the local press carried a report that Crawford planned to remain in South Africa. The 1906 Wisden carried the same story; in a comment on his success in 1905, it suggested that it was uncertain for how long he would play, and questioned whether, if he played Test cricket, he would do so for England or South Africa. The cricket historian Nigel Hart queries why Wisden mentioned South Africa; Crawford's only known connection came through his uncle, who had left South Africa five years before.

In all first-class matches on the tour, Crawford scored 531 runs at an average of 31.23, coming third in the tour batting averages, and took 34 wickets at an average of 18.44, placing him fifth among the regular bowlers in the team. In the early tour matches, Crawford recorded two five-wicket hauls and scored 98. He made his Test match debut for England against South Africa in the first Test at the age of 19 years and 32 days to become England's youngest Test cricketer, a record he held until Brian Close made his debut in 1949. Batting at number six, Crawford scored 44 runs in the first innings and 43 in the second; he took a wicket with his first delivery, bowling Bert Vogler. He was wicketless in the second innings, and bowled inaccurately as the home team recorded a one-wicket win. Wisden noted that Crawford batted well in both innings. After a month of cricket in between the Tests, during which Crawford scored 212 in a minor game, the English team were suffering from fatigue when the remaining matches were played. In the second Test, Crawford was promoted to open the batting, a position he retained for most of the series. In the final match, he scored 74, his first Test fifty and the highest score of his Test career. His best bowling also came in the final match, where he took three for 69.

In the Test series, Crawford scored 281 runs at an average of 31.22 and took nine wickets at 35.77. England lost the series 4–1, finding it difficult to bat against the South African googly bowlers. Wisden's tour report described Crawford's batting as one of the few positives for his team. Writing home during the tour, the MCC captain Pelham Warner frequently praised Crawford and the extent of his ability at a young age. The English press even parodied what Crawford's biographer, Michael Burns, describes as Warner's "near-obsession" with Crawford. Other critics believed that Crawford should have been more successful as a bowler but was distracted by the matting surfaces used in South Africa; (Note: Matting pitches were used as an alternative to turf in some parts of the world where it was difficult to produce a good grass pitch. The matting was made of jute or coir, and laid over a surface which may have been sand, grass, soil or gravel.) because he was able to make the ball bounce and turn extravagantly from the surface, he tried to spin the ball too much and lost accuracy as a result.

=== Surrey cricketer ===
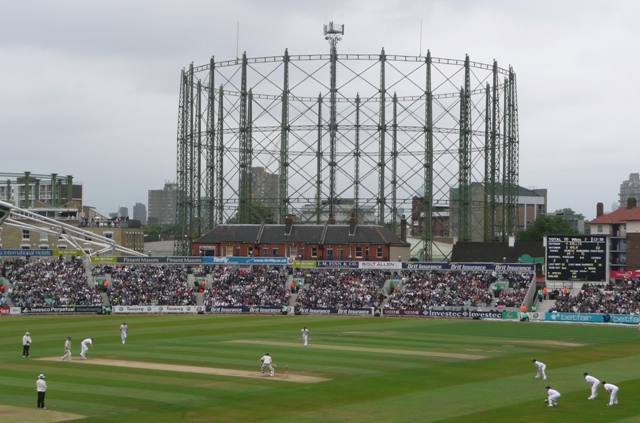
The Oval, Surrey's home ground, in 2008

Returning to England for the 1906 season, Crawford completed the double of 1,000 runs and 100 wickets in first-class cricket, the youngest player at the time to accomplish this feat. (Note: Brian Close broke this record in 1949.) Against Gloucestershire, he scored 148 and then took seven for 85 and four for 63 with the ball; he also took ten wickets in his next game. In total, he compiled 1,174 runs at an average of 30.10, and took 118 wickets at an average of 20.28. These performances earned him selection for the representative Gentlemen versus Players matches at both Lord's and The Oval, in which he played for the amateur Gentlemen. At the end of the season, he was chosen as one of Wisden's Cricketers of the Year. The citation said: "Few cricketers have won equal fame at so early an age", and noted the unusual ease with which he had moved into first-class cricket. Crawford's powerful batting and straight hitting were praised, as was his accurate bowling. The report also stated: "That he should have done all this is the more astonishing from the fact that he invariably plays in glasses. No one handicapped in this way has ever been so consistently successful both as batsman and bowler."

By this stage, Crawford had a reputation as a batsman who favoured aggressive, powerful shots and his performances drew in crowds. In 1907, in the space of a few days, he hit deliveries in two different matches through the windows of both the home and the visitors' dressing rooms at The Oval. Towards the end of the season, he scored 103 runs in 90 minutes against Kent, his only century that year, hitting several deliveries into the crowd; The Times described the ball in this innings as "soaring away like a bird". Crawford's overall batting record was similar to the previous season: he scored 1,158 runs at an average of 30.47. With the ball, he took 124 wickets at 16.95, completing his second double. Once again, he was selected in both Gentlemen v Players matches, taking six for 54 in the second, and was chosen to play two of the three Test matches against South Africa. These were his only Test matches in England; he scored 26 runs in three innings and was wicketless after bowling 29 overs. He missed England's victory in the second match, the only match in the series not to be a draw, but Wisden's correspondent believed that the pitch conditions for that game made it a mistake to leave Crawford out. Despite his lack of success in the Tests, Crawford was invited to tour Australia that winter even before the South African series was complete; he suggested to the press that he might remain in Australia after the tour.

=== Tour to Australia ===
The MCC team which toured Australia in 1907–08, like that which toured South Africa, faced questions about its strength. Because at least four first-choice players chose not to tour, and another was not selected despite strong claims, the team was less representative than usual for an Ashes series. The tourists lost the Tests 4–1, although Wisden suggested that the series was more competitive than suggested by the results.

Crawford began the tour well, taking seven wickets in the opening first-class match against Western Australia. In the second game, he scored 114 runs in 58 minutes against South Australia, the fastest first-class century scored in Australia until then, followed by bowling figures of five for 40 in the second innings. Crawford contributed little more with bat or ball in the lead-up to the Test series; in England, the cricketer Gilbert Jessop wrote an article suggesting that Crawford had become an "unsound" batsman. He scarcely bowled in the first Test, won by Australia, and both the English and the Australian press were critical of his bowling. Frederick Fane, the acting-captain of England, seemed to share this view in the second Test, withholding Crawford from the attack for some time. However, Crawford took five for 79 in the first innings helped to restrict Australia on a good batting pitch and took eight wickets in the match as England levelled the series.

Australia won the remaining games to win the series. In the third match, Crawford scored his only half-century of the series, hitting 62 out of England's 363 to help his team build up a first innings lead. However, Australia scored 506 at the second attempt, during which Crawford bowled nearly 46 overs to take three for 113. The series was settled in the fourth Test; Australia recorded a big victory after rain affected the pitch and created difficult batting conditions during England's first innings. On the first day, Crawford took five for 48, his best Test figures, as Australia were bowled out for 214 on a very good pitch. Wisden noted Crawford "[mixed] up his pace with remarkable skill". By this stage of the tour, the press looked on him much more favourably, and he received praise for his performances. However, his heavy workload with the ball affected his health; he lost a stone in weight during the tour, and before the final Test a Melbourne doctor diagnosed that he had "strained the right side of his heart" and advised that he see a specialist. Crawford played in that game, won by Australia, despite his ill health, with several other players unfit, and the tour manager later wrote that he looked poorly throughout and should not have played. Nevertheless, he bowled 54 overs and took eight wickets in the match.

Wisden considered Crawford's bowling to be one of the most successful features of the tour and praised his ability to spin the ball, reporting: "It was said of Crawford that even on the most perfect wickets he could at times make the ball break back." He led the English Test bowling averages with 30 wickets at an average of 24.73. His batting was less productive than expected; in five Tests, he scored 162 runs at an average of 18.00, batting usually at number eight. In all first-class matches on the tour, he scored 610 runs at 26.52 and took 66 wickets at 25.19. Crawford's contributions enhanced his growing reputation and critics expected his cricket to go from strength to strength. Australian batsman Clem Hill commented: "There are grand cricketers in this game, and then there is Jack Crawford." The final game in the series turned out to be Crawford's last Test. In 12 Test matches, he had scored 469 runs at an average of 22.33 and took 39 wickets at 29.48.

As the tour neared its completion, the Australian press reported that Crawford planned to remain in Australia, that he had attracted the attention of several "society" women, and that he had become engaged. Even so, he returned to England when the tour ended. In May 1909, he published a book about the tour, JN Crawford's Trip to "Kangaroo" land.

== Dispute with Surrey ==
=== Background ===
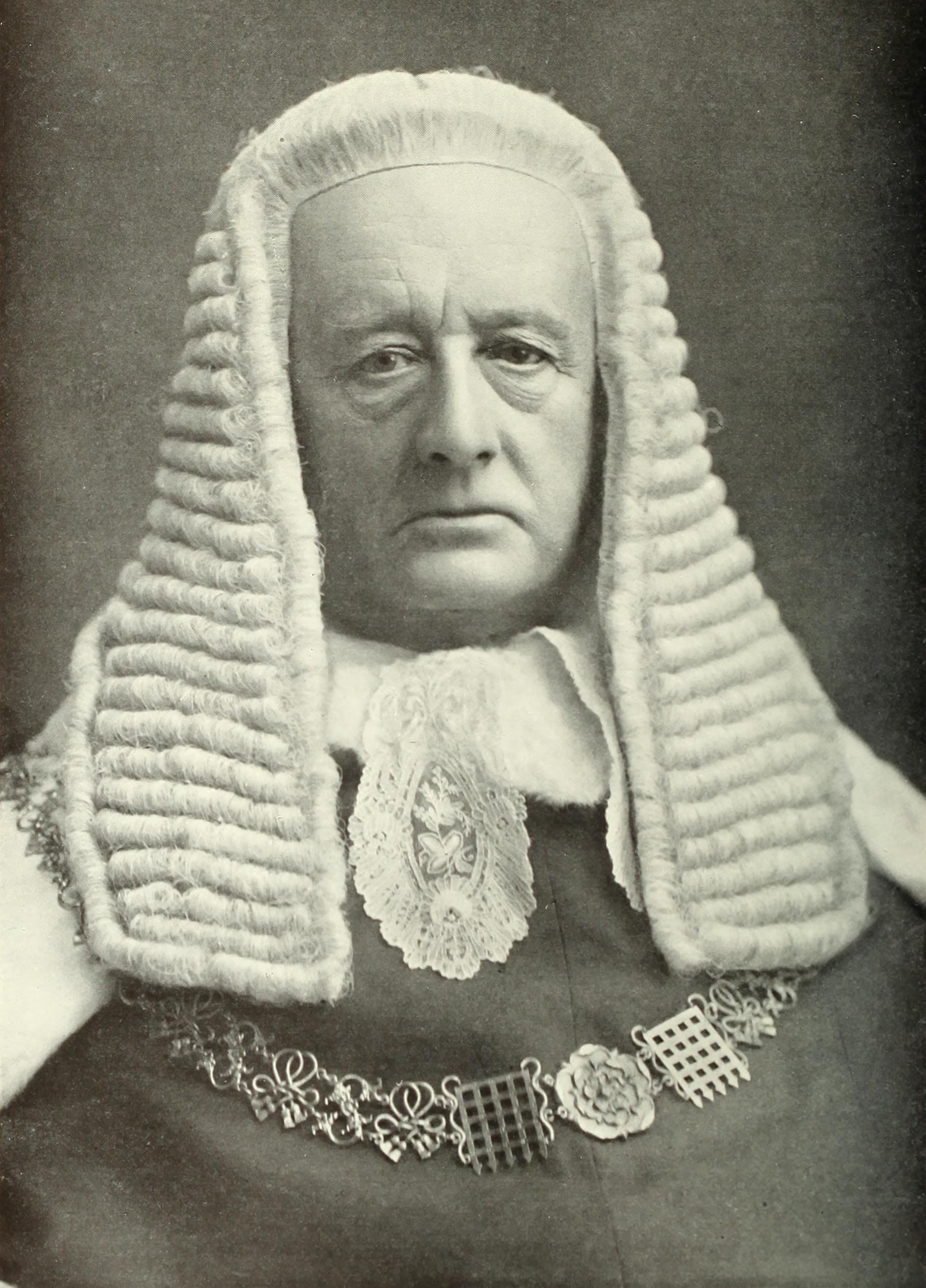
Lord Alverstone, the president of Surrey County Cricket Club from 1895 to 1915, was a key figure in its dispute with Crawford.

During the 1908 season, Crawford narrowly failed to complete his third double. He scored 1,371 runs at an average of 37.05 and took 98 wickets at 21.48. His season began with a probable dispute over the Surrey captaincy. H. D. G. Leveson Gower had been appointed captain for 1908 but the combination of an injury and his marriage left him unavailable for four matches near the beginning of the season. Crawford also missed the beginning of the season; a newspaper article by Albert Trott, a former Australian Test all-rounder then playing for Middlesex, suggested that Crawford withdrew from the team because he was not appointed captain in Leveson Gower's absence. Instead Harry Bush, who had not played first-class cricket for five years, led the team. Trott was sympathetic to Crawford, stating that the Surrey committee went out of their way "to inflict a most undeserved slight" on Crawford. (Note: Burns suggests that this was the actual reason for Crawford's absence because his father, who kept a scrapbook of newspaper clippings throughout his son's career, kept Trott's article.)

In the remainder of the season, Crawford scored 232 against Somerset, his highest first-class score, as well as centuries against Derbyshire and Hampshire. The increased strength and variety of Surrey's bowling attack restricted his opportunities; he was used less as a strike bowler and bowled fewer overs than in the previous season. Contemporary reports suggested that his performances tailed off as the season progressed, possibly through tiredness from having played too much cricket, and that he became a less accurate bowler through trying too hard to spin the ball. The Surrey captaincy remained unsettled; Crawford led the team on several occasions, including Surrey's final game of the season, when his brother Vivian captained Leicestershire, their opponents.

Crawford, who played as an amateur but was not independently wealthy, received an increased expenses allowance during 1908, but other financial dealings with the committee were less successful: they paid his laundry bills in 1905, but refused to do so afterwards; additionally, they refused his request in 1907 to have part of his expenses paid for matches that he missed, as happened with the wages of professionals. His financial problems were compounded by his inability to find a suitable job, and the Surrey committee threatened that he "ought not to be played on the same terms" unless he "[commenced] to earn his livelihood".

Crawford's performances in the 1909 season were less effective than in previous years. He began well, but was later hampered by an injury which prevented him from bowling. His batting average also fell. Surrey experienced disciplinary problems with several of their professional players during the season. The club president, Lord Alverstone, favoured amateurs, arguing that a losing amateur team was preferable to a professional team that won; several professionals were left out in favour of amateurs. Apart from adversely affecting some players' careers, this preference had destabilised the team over several seasons. Crawford disagreed with Alverstone, but nevertheless frequently assumed the leadership in the absence of the regular captain Leveson Gower for much of the season. He captained Surrey to a win over the touring Australian team early in 1909 after a strong performance by the professional bowler Tom Rushby. However, his captaincy was strongly criticised in the press, particularly over his management of the bowling. Around this time, Crawford's form declined. With the bat, he was often dismissed attempting aggressive shots, and he lost his effectiveness as a bowler. As a result, he was not chosen for the Gentlemen and missed selection in the Ashes series. The press continued to criticise his captaincy, despite Surrey's good results under his leadership. Burns notes: "For a young man with no experience of prolonged failure on the cricket field, this was almost certainly a traumatic time."

Surrey had other problems at this time. When the team arrived in Chesterfield to play Derbyshire, eight of the professionals were arrested following an incident in the street; the matter was cleared up and the press suggested that the police had been over-eager. The county subsequently defeated Derbyshire by an innings in early July; Rushby and his fellow professionals Walter Lees and W. C. Smith were very successful with the ball. Shortly after this, Rushby and Lees were involved in an incident of some kind—the exact details are unknown. Leveson Gower suspended them, making them unavailable for Surrey's second match against the Australians. Crawford was asked to lead the team for that game, but with Rushby and Lees omitted, another bowler missing and himself unable to bowl owing to a shoulder injury, he considered the attack too weak. Consequently, he refused the captaincy, and apologised to the Australians for the selection of what he thought a substandard team. In Crawford's absence, Surrey were led by the professional Tom Hayward; the match, affected by rain, was drawn.

=== Correspondence and split ===
The cricket press noticed the absence of Crawford and the professionals from Surrey's team over the following games, and noted that Crawford was now playing club cricket. Meanwhile, Alverstone wrote to Crawford that the Surrey committee fully supported Leveson Gower's decision to omit Rushby and Lees, and told him that Surrey would not select him again unless he apologised to Leveson Gower. Crawford refused, writing to Alverstone: "I do not know who was responsible for the selection of the second eleven sort of team furnished up for such an important match ... There seems to be some impression amongst a few of the Surrey committee that I am some young professional instead of being a young fellow who has had an experience of cricket that has seldom fallen to the lot of anyone, and my request for an alteration of the team should have had some weight". In his History of Cricket, Benny Green describes the letter as evidence of a "literate and quietly self-confident young man who will not easily be manipulated."

Alverstone replied that he "regretted" Crawford's views; the committee respected Crawford as a "brilliant amateur with great experience", but Crawford had not supported his captain—a prime duty for an amateur. Crawford replied that he had been unaware of the reason for the suspensions of Rushby and Lees—which Alverstone and the committee disputed—and would have supported Leveson Gower, but suggested it was unfair to ask him to captain a weak bowling team and then demand he apologise for preferring not to. He also observed that the players omitted from the team against the Australians had since been restored to the county team, making their exclusion harder to understand in the first place.

At this point Leveson Gower withdrew his invitation for Crawford to appear at the Scarborough Festival; Leveson Gower also prevented Crawford's selection for the MCC winter tour of South Africa. Crawford's father wrote to the Surrey committee in support of his son. By the beginning of August 1909, two weeks after the match against the Australians, the Surrey committee severed their connection with Crawford; Leveson Gower felt that he had shown the "deepest ingratitude". Wisden reported: "The committee were much incensed and passed a resolution that Crawford be not again asked to play for the county." Informed of his expulsion by letter, Crawford replied to the committee a final time: "I fail to see why I should practically be branded as a criminal because, as acting captain, I declined the responsibility of skippering a team which did not include three essential players, an independence which I trust will remain in spite of the awful example made of me to every amateur in the United Kingdom."

The Surrey committee initially attempted to keep the dispute private, but Crawford sent copies of the letters to the newspapers, explaining in a letter that he wished to end speculation about his absence from Surrey. Burns notes that this "[generated] a strong response from the public, mainly unsympathetic to the young amateur" in the letters pages of many newspapers. Many commentators felt that the argument could have been resolved easily had either team made concessions. Green comments that the committee probably either expected Crawford to back down, or were happy to sacrifice him to establish their authority. Another of the players involved, Rushby, left Surrey at the end of the season to play league cricket, but later returned to the team. Crawford's father made a further attempt to end the dispute between Surrey and his son in 1910, asking the committee to reverse their decision. Wisden reported that Alverstone declined on the grounds that it would suggest a lack of confidence in the committee, but that if Crawford "came forward in a sportsmanlike way [Alverstone] would be proud to give his personal support to the step proposed. This of course meant that an apology was expected."

In his History of Cricket, Green contended that the "Surrey committee must be held accountable for a degree of idiocy rarely met with even in the realms of cricket administration" for the way they dealt with Crawford, "one of the world's most prodigious all-rounders." Hart observes that Crawford was challenging figures high up in the cricket establishment on the Surrey committee; he also suggests that Crawford's actions in his later career, and the complaints made against him by other cricket authorities, reveal a stubbornness in his character and suggest he was not merely a victim of the Surrey committee. The Times speculated that factors other than the dispute may have contributed to Surrey's decision. Burns believes that Crawford was feeling pressure from several directions: his inability to secure a job, possible frustration at the controlling influence of his father, a desire to be independent, his poor run of form and criticism of his captaincy. Even though, according to Burns, it was an "unwinnable battle", he suggests simply: "Young Jack was in the mood for a fight."

At the end of the season, Crawford played his last matches in England for 10 years, appearing for an "England XI" against the Australians and for the Gentlemen of the South. He had previously discussed emigrating to Australia with the Australian Test player Victor Trumper, who had asked Clem Hill to investigate a potential teaching post at St Peter's College, Adelaide. Originally, assuming that he would be part of the MCC tour to South Africa, he planned to take up his position in March 1910. When the dispute arose, Crawford sent a telegram to inform the college he would take up the post of "Resident Master" early in 1910, for a salary of £160 per year. Burns suggests that this knowledge that he had the offer of work may have prompted him to take a stand against the Surrey committee. In October 1909 he was offered the position of "Ordinary Master" at the college, and £50 towards his travel expenses if he departed immediately. He left England by boat two days later, seen off by his family. No cricket figures saw his departure, but there was considerable interest from the press.

== Later career ==
=== Cricket in South Australia ===
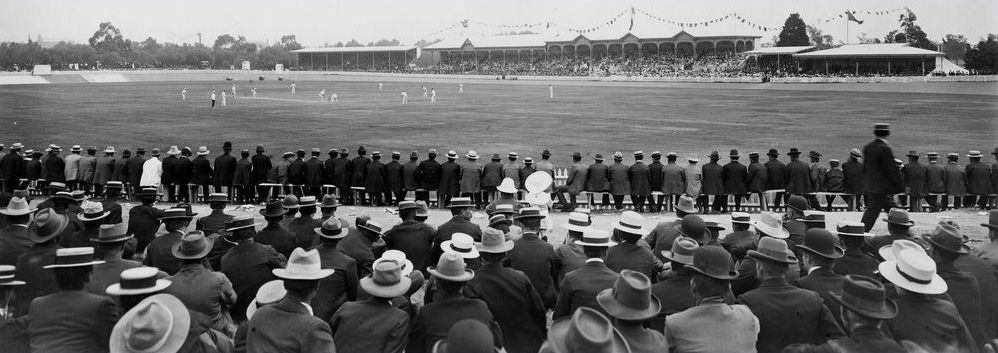
The Adelaide Oval, South Australia's home ground, in 1902

At St Peter's School, Crawford combined his teaching role with supervision of sports, including acting as coach for the cricket team. On several occasions, he had to request leave from the headmaster to play first-class cricket. After arriving in Australia in December 1909, he was playing district cricket for East Torrens within a week, and played in South Australia's last three matches in the Sheffield Shield competition; the team went on to win the trophy for the first time since 1893–94. Crawford played a large part in this success. There was some controversy over his eligibility to play; New South Wales initially protested, but there was a precedent for ignoring the requirement of a three-month qualification period, and the New South Wales Cricket Association (NSWCA) Executive Committee accepted this in the case of Crawford, to the displeasure of the full NSWCA. Over four seasons, Crawford played 22 matches for South Australia, scoring 1,512 runs at an average of 40.86 and taking 120 wickets at 23.86. Green suggests that such a performance would have earned him Test selection if he had been Australian, and Wisden noted that his record in Australia was impressive.

In the 1910–11 Australian season, Crawford scored a half-century in every first-class game he played but was less successful with the ball. His success against the touring South Africans, perhaps helped by his experience facing their googly bowlers on previous occasions, brought him close to selection for the Australian Test team that year. The Australian Board of Control eventually decided that, as he had already appeared for England, they could not choose him; instead they picked Charlie Kelleway as the all-rounder. Crawford resigned from his position as St Peter's in March 1911, suggesting to the press that he might move into farming. He may have considered leaving South Australia, but the Cricket Association appointed him as a clerk at the Adelaide Oval, a position which earned £200 per annum, with additional responsibility for coaching and youth scouting. Meanwhile, in England, after unsuccessful attempts by his father to change the mind of the Surrey committee, including a failed bid to secure his own election to the committee, Crawford sent a written apology to Surrey at some time in 1910. Consequently, the committee passed a motion in March 1911 which ended the ban on Crawford playing for the county.

Press rumours over the following 12 months cast doubt on Crawford's future, suggestions including a return to England for the 1912 season. Instead, he remained with South Australia in the 1911–12 season. Although less successful generally, he played for a non-representative Australian XI against the MCC touring team which contested the Ashes that season and scored 110 in as many minutes against bowlers including Sydney Barnes, at the time regarded as the greatest bowler in the world. The following season, in which South Australia again won the Shield, Crawford took seven for 31 against Western Australia, including a hat-trick, and scored 163 in 177 minutes against Victoria before taking eight for 66 in their first innings.

In 1913, Crawford was included in an Australian team which toured North America. The team was organised by Edgar Mayne, a South Australian batsman who tried to secure backing from the Australian Board of Control to make it an official representative team, but the Board refused to do so. In all matches, Crawford scored over 1,000 runs and took over 200 wickets, and he was particularly effective as a bowler in the matches designated first-class. He later stated that this was the best tour he had been on; more press rumours suggested that he would return to England at the conclusion of the tour, but he returned to Australia with the rest of the team.

=== Further controversy ===
In December 1913, Crawford wrote to the South Australian Cricket Association (SACA) asking for a six-month leave of absence and a guaranteed renewal of his contract. The SACA described his letter as "arrogant" before eventually granting his request and offering him a three-year contract worth around £300 per year, including coaching fees. In effect, he wanted to double his salary or leave to seek a position in New Zealand. Describing these events, Hart comments: "Crawford's financial dealings with the SACA reveal him both as mercenary and as an awkward 'cuss'. The latter aspect of his personality needs to be taken into account lest he be considered merely an establishment victim in his parting with Surrey". On the field, Crawford was successful in 1913–14. He took 34 wickets, and against New South Wales he hit 91 in 89 minutes before taking 10 wickets; against Victoria he took eleven wickets. This latter match was his last for South Australia. Later in 1914, Crawford toured New Zealand with an Australian team—assembled without the approval of the Australian Board of Control—which contained many leading players, under the captaincy of the former Canterbury batsman Arthur Sims. In first-class games on this tour Crawford took 21 wickets and scored a century, but his most notable innings came in a minor match. Against the "XV of South Canterbury", he scored 354 in five-and-a-quarter hours, striking 14 sixes and 45 fours. He and Victor Trumper shared a partnership of 298 in 69 minutes, and Monty Noble helped him to score 50 runs in 9 minutes as the Australian team scored 922 for nine.

In March 1914, the Otago Cricket Association (OCA) offered Crawford a three-year contract worth £350 per year, and a share in the management of a sports store, to play for them. Briefly returning to Adelaide after the tour, he resigned from his South Australia contract before moving to Dunedin in June 1914. The South Australian Cricket Association were widely criticised for failing to retain Crawford; in their defence, the committee publicly stated that Crawford had been offered an increased deal and had promised to turn down any offers made to him in New Zealand, but went back on his word. Later historians—Nigel Hart in his biography of Crawford, and Chris Harte in his A History of Australian Cricket (1993)—condemned Crawford as arrogant and mercenary for his behaviour towards South Australia. Harte also suggests that Crawford left Australia with many debts. Burns, however, suggests that Crawford may have wanted to maximise his earnings to support his upcoming marriage, and notes that his South Australian teammates held no grudges and even organised a farewell presentation. Once in his new position, Crawford immediately organised a Colts team which produced several future Otago players. While qualifying to play for Otago, he played club cricket in Dunedin, scoring 559 runs and taking 88 wickets. During the 1914–15 season he appeared in four first-class games for Otago, in which he scored 337 runs and took 30 wickets. He briefly returned to Australia in 1915 to marry Anita Schmidt in Melbourne in April. Schmidt—from Adelaide and described in the society press as a "beauty"—and Crawford met in 1912 when the former was 18 years old and became well known as a couple at fashionable events in Adelaide. Burns suggests that the wedding took place in Melbourne rather than Adelaide because Crawford may have been avoiding his creditors. Two days after the wedding, the couple returned to New Zealand.

Crawford's wages caused the OCA some financial difficulty and were the cause of extended negotiations in 1915. Part of the settlement involved Crawford receiving a lower salary in return for freedom to offer his services to other clubs on a freelance basis. As a consequence, he represented different teams throughout the season in local cricket. He was also paid to coach at Otago Boys' High School. There were other difficulties; the association complained about the lateness of Crawford's report on the Otago team, and were unhappy that he also coached golf. Crawford in turn told the association that several Otago players were late for practice. After further complaints about Crawford's coaching in 1916, the OCA decided to terminate his contract. Crawford initially offered to continue for less money—£245. The OCA bargained, suggesting a payment of £200, whereupon Crawford insisted that he should be paid £300. The OCA then proposed to terminate his contract immediately for a payment of £150 but he refused. He was eventually paid £200 in June to leave Otago. That November, with the First World War into its third year, New Zealand brought in conscription. Crawford was called up in July 1917, and was posted to a training camp near Wellington in late 1917. During this time, he played twice for Wellington's cricket team in first-class matches during early 1918. When given weekend passes, he visited his wife who was left alone in Dunedin. He travelled to England prior to a posting to the Western Front, although he arrived too late to join the fighting. He was part of the New Zealand Rifle Brigade but it is unclear what his rank was. The Repton School War Register states that he was a rifleman but New Zealand press accounts named him as a quartermaster sergeant. According to a 1992 article in Wisden Cricket Monthly by Jim Sullivan, Crawford was demoted while he was in the army. The reasons are unknown, but Burns speculates that his "independent and obstinate nature" made it difficult for him to accept military discipline. While Crawford was in the army, his wife moved to Adelaide. According to Anita, the marriage became unhappy in 1916 and Crawford left her in November of that year. She claimed that he had not supported her financially from that point. When the war ended, she returned to live in Australia with her parents. Her subsequent career as a dress designer and fashion buyer necessitated a move to London, where Crawford was living, in 1921 but the couple never reconciled. They were divorced, with some publicity in Australia, in 1923; in court, she gave evidence that he had an affair with a "third party". She went on to remarry and to have a successful career as a designer and orchestral conductor.

=== Return to England ===
After the First World War, Crawford returned to live in England, and was demobilised from the New Zealand Army in April 1919. Looking for work, he wrote to Surrey offering to play for them if they found him some employment in turn, but the committee, while writing that they would be pleased if he played for the county again, could not "see [their] way to find him employment". Crawford may have been contemplating playing professional cricket—unheard of for a former Public School cricketer—but instead found work at Repton, his old school. It is unclear what his position at Repton was at this time; he seems to have had no official cricketing role and it is possible he worked as a teacher simply to maintain his amateur status. In any case, Crawford remained at Repton only until the end of the academic year; his short stay may have been the result of poor results by the cricket team. However, Burns suggests: "Another indication that the school was not entirely happy to be associated with the Surrey rebel, whose baggage also included an indifferent war record, was that when the Old Boys cricket team, the Repton Pilgrims, was formed in 1921, Crawford was alone among the school's former distinguished players not to be made a member. He was not invited to join the club until 1952."

Having settled his disagreement with Surrey, Crawford resumed his English first-class cricket career in 1919. After appearing for the Gentlemen against the Players, Crawford returned to play for Surrey against the Australian Imperial Forces. He scored 144 not out, which was later described by Wisden as the innings of his life. Surrey were 26 for five in reply to the tourists' innings of 436 when Crawford came in to bat. Neville Cardus reported: "[Crawford] fell upon the advancing Australian attack, and by driving seldom equalled, threw it back." He more than doubled his score after the ninth wicket had fallen, hitting 73 out of the last 80 runs scored in 35 minutes to take Surrey past the target required to avoid the follow-on. Among his other successes, he scored 92 against Yorkshire. Playing against Kent, he hit 48 not out as Jack Hobbs and he scored 96 in 32 minutes; this partnership took Surrey to victory as they chased an apparently impossible chase in the short time remaining in the match.

In total, Crawford played in eight games in 1919, scoring 488 runs and taking 20 wickets. Wisden commented that his batting was as good as it had ever been, but his bowling lacked spin and accuracy. He played only four more times in first-class cricket. Part of the explanation was that he joined Dunlop Rubber as a manager at one of its mills in Rochdale. He played as an amateur for Rochdale Cricket Club in 1920, but by 1921 he had left the club—the Manchester Guardian speculated that he had returned to Surrey. He returned to live with his family in Merton Park, and played for the local cricket club. Of his first-class matches, one was for Surrey against the Australian touring team of 1921 and the others were for teams representing the Gentlemen. In his entire first-class career, Crawford scored 9,488 runs at an average of 32.60 and took 815 wickets at 20.66.

From the mid-1920s until his retirement in 1952, Crawford worked for the importers Elders and Fyffes. He played cricket and hockey for the firm until the Second World War, but kept a far lower profile than in his earlier cricketing life. He married his second wife, Hilda May Beman, in December 1925, but he never had children. He maintained a loose connection with cricket; he appeared at a birthday dinner for Pelham Warner, at a centenary celebration for the Free Foresters Cricket Club and in a radio broadcast for Jack Hobbs's 80th birthday. Crawford had a stroke in early 1962 and remained ill for the rest of the year; he died, aged 76, in a Surrey hospital on 2 May 1963.

== Style and technique ==
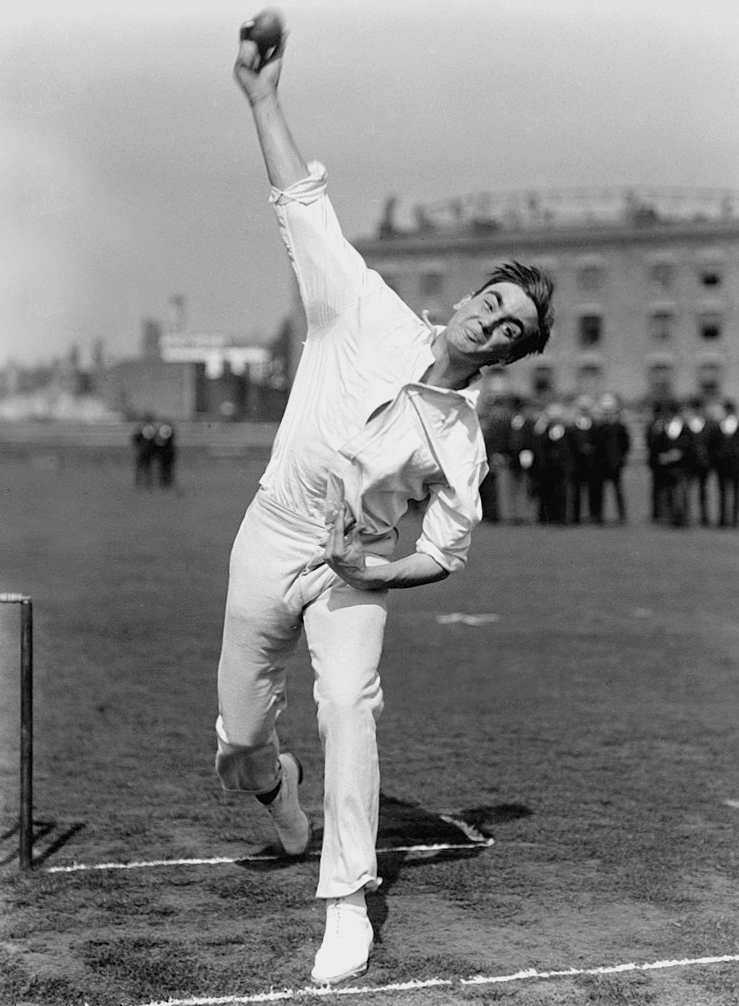
Crawford demonstrating his bowling action in 1906

Crawford's obituary in The Times described him as one of the best young players to play cricket in England and said: "Although he invariably played in glasses, he was a most attractive player to watch, an aggressive hitter of the ball and a dangerous medium-paced bowler". Wisden described him as a "hard-hitting batsman", and said he played mainly from the front foot. He had an orthodox batting technique, moved his feet well to get to the ball, and played very straight. Herbie Collins, who played with Crawford in Australia, described one of his innings as "a hurricane innings, full of classical shots charged with dynamite."

As a bowler, Crawford's technique was also orthodox, although he was unusual in using his second and third fingers to spin the ball—most bowlers used their first and second. His bowling pace varied from fast to medium, and he spun the ball so much that his fingers snapped audibly as he released it. An accurate bowler, it was difficult for batsmen to score runs against him. Crawford could swing the ball away from the bat, but his most effective delivery was his off break: Clem Hill stated that Crawford could make the ball turn several inches, despite the hard pitches prevalent in Australia when he played there. John Arlott described him as "the schoolboy genius who turned on Australian pitches where no one else deviated from straight". In 1937, Herbie Collins wrote, at a time when Wally Hammond was considered to be the world's leading all-rounder, that "people who have seen both men consider [Crawford] a better all-rounder".

Commenting on the interruption of Crawford's career by his dispute with Surrey, Neville Cardus wrote: "His break with Surrey must be regarded as a sad deprivation of fame and pleasure to himself, and a grievous loss to the annals of English cricket. It is as certain as anything in a man's life can be confidently postulated, that had he continued to play in English county cricket ... he would have taken his place amongst the select company of England's captains." The Times commented: "It was one of the great disappointments of English cricket in the first quarter of this century that his outstanding promise was never fully realized." Hart observes that Crawford's on-field successes were many up to 1909 but after that, his career effectively stalled during his absence from English cricket. Hart notes Crawford's "capacity to get on the scoreboard and up establishment noses. He could turn games around and agreements over, antagonise the powerful, endear himself to the young and those young enough at heart to care to characterise great personal performances as 'heroic'". He concludes that Crawford spent the last 40 years of his life "in comparative sporting obscurity". No-one on the Surrey committee ever expressed regret at what had happened, and Leveson Gower did not mention the affair in his autobiography.

== Bibliography ==
- Burns, Michael (2015). A Flick of the Fingers: The Chequered Life and Career of Jack Crawford. Worthing, Sussex: Pitch Publishing Ltd. ISBN 978-1-78531-063-8.
- Green, Benny, ed. (1982). Wisden Anthology 1900–1940. London: Queen Anne Press. ISBN 0-7472-0706-2.
- Green, Benny (1988). A History of Cricket. London: Guild Publishing. ISBN 978-0-71262-080-2. OCLC 671855644.
- Hart, Nigel (2003). Whimpress, Bernard (ed.). J. N. Crawford: His Record Innings By Innings. Nottingham: Association of Cricket Statisticians and Historians. ISBN 1-902171-79-9.
- McKinstry, Leo (2011). Jack Hobbs: England's Greatest Cricketer. London: Yellow Jersey Press. ISBN 978-0-224-08329-4.
- Swanton, E. W., ed. (1980). Barclays World of Cricket (2nd ed.). Collins. ISBN 0-00-216349-7.
- Wynne-Thomas, Peter (1989). The Complete History of Cricket Tours at Home and Abroad. London: Guild Publishing. ISBN 978-0-60055-782-1.
