= France at the 1906 Intercalated Games =

France at the Olympics

- IOC code: FRA
- NOC: French Olympic Committee

in Athens
- Competitors: 56 in 11 sports
- Medals Ranked 1st: Gold 15 Silver 9 Bronze 16 Total 40

Summer appearances
- 1896; 1900; ~~1904~~; 1908; 1912; 1920; 1924; 1928; 1932; 1936; 1948; 1952; 1956; 1960; 1964; 1968; 1972; 1976; 1980; 1984; 1988; 1992; 1996; 2000; 2004; 2008; 2012; 2016; 2020; 2024; 2028

Winter appearances
- 1924; 1928; 1932; 1936; 1948; 1952; 1956; 1960; 1964; 1968; 1972; 1976; 1980; 1984; 1988; 1992; 1994; 1998; 2002; 2006; 2010; 2014; 2018; 2022; 2026

France competed at the 1906 Intercalated Games in Athens, Greece. 56 athletes, 55 men and 1 woman, competed in 51 events in 11 sports.

== Athletics ==
Track

Athlete	Events	Heat		Semifinals		Final	
Athlete	Events	Result	Rank	Result	Rank	Result	Rank
Georges Malfait	100 metres	Unknown	3	did not advance			
Marc Bellin du Coteau	100 metres	Unknown	3	did not advance			
Marc Bellin du Coteau	400 metres	Unknown	2 Q	Unknown	2 Q	Unknown	8
Georges Malfait	400 metres	Unknown	4	did not advance			
Michel Soalhat	800 metres	Unknown	Unknown	n/a		did not advance	
Michel Soalhat	1500 metres	Unknown	5	n/a		did not advance	
Louis Bonniot de Fleurac	5 Mile	n/a				did not finish	
Gaston Ragueneau	5 Mile	n/a				did not finish	
André Roffi	Marathon	n/a				3-17:49.8	8
Émile Bonheure	Marathon	n/a				did not finish	
Henri Molinié	110 metres hurdles	Unknown	2 Q	Unknown	2 Q	Unknown	5

Field

Athlete	Events	Final	
Athlete	Events	Result	Rank
Henri Molinié	High jump	Unknown	Unknown
Jean Papot	High jump	Unknown	Unknown
Fernand Gonder	Pole vault	3.500	1st place, gold medalist(s)
Henri Jardin	Standing long jump	2.830	9
Alexandre Maspoli	Standing long jump	2.695	18
André Tison	Standing long jump	2.660	22
André Tison	Shot put	11.020	4
André Désfarges	Shot put	Unknown	Unknown
André Désfarges	Stone throw	Unknown	Unknown
André Tison	Discus	34.810	5
André Désfarges	Discus	Unknown	Unknown
André Désfarges	Pentathlon (Ancient)	did not finish	

== Cycling ==
Athlete	Events	Heat		Semifinals		Final	
Athlete	Events	Result	Rank	Result	Rank	Result	Rank
Fernand Vast	Individual road race	n/a				2-41:28	1st place, gold medalist(s)
Maurice Bardonneau	Individual road race	n/a				2-41:28 2/5	2nd place, silver medalist(s)
Edmond Luguet	Individual road race	n/a				2-41:28 3/5	3rd place, bronze medalist(s)
Émile Demangel	Sprint	n/a				Unknown	Unknown
Fernand Vast	Sprint	n/a				Unknown	Unknown
Gaston Delaplane	Sprint	n/a				Unknown	Unknown
Charles Delaporte	Sprint	n/a				Unknown	Unknown
Henri Menjou	Sprint	n/a				Unknown	Unknown
Edmond Luguet	Sprint	n/a				Unknown	Unknown
Henri Menjou	333 metres time trial	n/a				23 1/5	3rd place, bronze medalist(s)
Émile Demangel	333 metres time trial	n/a				23 3/5	4
Fernand Vast	333 metres time trial	n/a				24 3/5	15
Fernand Vast	5000 metres	3:10 1/5	1 Q	Unknown	2 q	Unknown	3rd place, bronze medalist(s)
Émile Demangel	5000 metres	3:12 3/5	1 Q	7:40	1 Q	Unknown	4
Henri Menjou	5000 metres	Unknown	2	did not advance			
Maurice Bardonneau	5000 metres	Unknown	3	did not advance			
Gaston Delaplane	5000 metres	Unknown	3	did not advance			
Edmond Luguet	5000 metres	Unknown	2 q	Unknown	2	did not advance	
Maurice Bardonneau	20 kilometres	Unknown	Unknown Q	n/a		29:30	2nd place, silver medalist(s)
Fernand Vast	20 kilometres	Unknown	Unknown Q	n/a		29:32	3rd place, bronze medalist(s)
Edmond Luguet	20 kilometres	Unknown	Unknown Q	n/a		Unknown	6
Henri Menjou	20 kilometres	Unknown	Unknown	did not advance			

== Fencing ==
Athlete	Events	Heat Group	Semifinal Group	Final Group
Athlete	Events	Rank	Rank	Rank
Georges Dillon-Kavanagh	Individual Foil	1 Q	2 Q	1st place, gold medalist(s)
Pierre Georges Louis d'Hugues	Individual Foil	1 Q	1 Q	3rd place, bronze medalist(s)
Joseph Sénat	Individual Foil	2 Q	Unknown	did not advance
Georges de la Falaise	Individual Épée	2 Q	2 Q	1st place, gold medalist(s)
Georges Dillon-Kavanagh	Individual Épée	1 Q	2 Q	2nd place, silver medalist(s)
Pierre Georges Louis d'Hugues	Individual Épée	1 Q	did not finish	did not advance
Georges de la Falaise; Georges Dillon-Kavanagh; Cyril Mohr; Pierre Georges Louis d'Hugues	Épée Team	walkover	Greece (GRE); 11-9	Great Britain (GBR); 18-15 (gold)
Georges de la Falaise	Individual Sabre	2 Q	2 Q	4
Georges Dillon-Kavanagh	Individual Sabre	Unknown	did not advance	
Pierre Georges Louis d'Hugues	Individual Sabre	Unknown	did not advance	

== Gymnastics ==
Athlete	Events	Final	
Athlete	Events	Result	Rank
Pierre Payssé	Individual All-Around	116	1st place, gold medalist(s)
George Charmoille	Individual All-Around	113	3rd place, bronze medalist(s)
Pissiè	Individual All-Around	110	6
Daniel Lavielle	Individual All-Around	109	10
Pierre Payssé	Individual All-Around (5 events)	97	1st place, gold medalist(s)
George Charmoille	Individual All-Around (5 events)	94	3rd place, bronze medalist(s)
Pissiè	Individual All-Around (5 events)	91	6
Daniel Lavielle	Individual All-Around (5 events)	90	7

== Rowing ==
Athlete	Events	Final	
Athlete	Events	Result	Rank
Gaston Delaplane	Single sculls	5:53.4	1st place, gold medalist(s)
Joseph Larran	Single sculls	6:07.2	2nd place, silver medalist(s)
Gaston Delaplane; Charles Delaporte; Marcel Frébourg	Coxed pairs (1 km)	Unknown	3rd place, bronze medalist(s)
Adolphe Bernard; Joseph Halcet; Jean-Baptist Mathieu	Coxed pairs (1 km)	Unknown	4
Adolphe Bernard; Joseph Halcet; Jean-Baptist Mathieu	Coxed pairs (1 mile)	8:08.6	3rd place, bronze medalist(s)
Gaston Delaplane; Charles Delaporte; Marcel Frébourg	Coxed pairs (1 mile)	Unknown	Unknown
Gaston Delaplane; Charles Delaporte; Léon Delignières; Paul Echard; Marcel Frébourg	Coxed fours	Unknown	2nd place, silver medalist(s)
Adolphe Bernard; Joseph Halcet; Jean-Baptist Mathieu; Jean-Baptist Laporte; Pierre Sourbé	Coxed fours	Unknown	3rd place, bronze medalist(s)

== Shooting ==
Athlete	Event	Target Hits	Points	Rank
Maurice Lecoq	Free pistol, 25 metres	30	258	1st place, gold medalist(s)
Léon Moreaux	Free pistol, 25 metres	30	249	2nd place, silver medalist(s)
Hermann Martin	Free pistol, 25 metres	30	236	7
Jean Fouconnier	Free pistol, 25 metres	30	234	9
Maurice Fauré	Free pistol, 25 metres	29	226	13
Raoul de Boigne	Free pistol, 25 metres	29	204	23
Jean Fouconnier	Free pistol, 50 metres	30	219	2nd place, silver medalist(s)
Maurice Lecoq	Free pistol, 50 metres	30	205	6
Raoul de Boigne	Free pistol, 50 metres	30	198	9
Maurice Fauré	Free pistol, 50 metres	30	192	14
Hermann Martin	Free pistol, 50 metres	30	185	16
Léon Moreaux	Free pistol, 50 metres	30	184	19
Jean Fouconnier	Gras Model Revolver, 20 metres	30	219	1st place, gold medalist(s)
Raoul de Boigne	Gras Model Revolver, 20 metres	30	216	2nd place, silver medalist(s)
Hermann Martin	Gras Model Revolver, 20 metres	30	215	3rd place, bronze medalist(s)
Maurice Lecoq	Gras Model Revolver, 20 metres	30	211	4
Maurice Fauré	Gras Model Revolver, 20 metres	30	197	9
Léon Moreaux	Gras Model Revolver, 20 metres	29	189	16
Léon Moreaux	Military Revolver, 20 metres	30	239	5
Jean Fouconnier	Military Revolver, 20 metres	30	226	11
Raoul de Boigne	Military Revolver, 20 metres	30	225	12
Hermann Martin	Military Revolver, 20 metres	30	222	15
Maurice Lecoq	Military Revolver, 20 metres	30	218	17
Maurice Fauré	Military Revolver, 20 metres	30	205	24
Léon Moreaux	Dueling Pistol Au Visé, 20 metres	30	242	1st place, gold medalist(s)
Maurice Lecoq	Dueling Pistol Au Visé, 20 metres	29	231	3rd place, bronze medalist(s)
Jean Fouconnier	Dueling Pistol Au Visé, 20 metres	30	210	8
Hermann Martin	Dueling Pistol Au Visé, 20 metres	30	209	9
Raoul de Boigne	Dueling Pistol Au Visé, 20 metres	30	203	11
Maurice Fauré	Dueling Pistol Au Visé, 20 metres	27	193	13
Léon Moreaux	Dueling Pistol Au Commandement, 25 metres	23	104	6
Maurice Fauré	Dueling Pistol Au Commandement, 25 metres	22	98	10
Hermann Martin	Dueling Pistol Au Commandement, 25 metres	22	95	11
Maurice Lecoq	Dueling Pistol Au Commandement, 25 metres	21	89	12
Charles Clapier	Dueling Pistol Au Commandement, 25 metres	20	78	15
Raoul de Boigne	Dueling Pistol Au Commandement, 25 metres	17	70	18
Jean Fouconnier	Dueling Pistol Au Commandement, 25 metres	16	68	20
Léon Moreaux; Maurice Lecoq; Raoul de Boigne; Jean Fouconnier; Maurice Fauré	Free Rifle, 3 positions 300 metres Team	599	4511	3rd place, bronze medalist(s)
Léon Moreaux	Free Rifle any position, 300 metres	30	234	3rd place, bronze medalist(s)
Raoul de Boigne	Free Rifle any position, 300 metres	30	224	7
Jean Fouconnier	Free Rifle any position, 300 metres	30	223	8
Maurice Lecoq	Free Rifle any position, 300 metres	30	216	13
Hermann Martin	Free Rifle any position, 300 metres	30	199	19
Maurice Fauré	Free Rifle any position, 300 metres	30	198	21
Léon Moreaux	Rifle Gras Model Kneeling or Standing, 200 metres	28	136	15
Maurice Fauré	Rifle Gras Model Kneeling or Standing, 200 metres	27	154	27
Raoul de Boigne	Rifle Gras Model Kneeling or Standing, 200 metres	27	154	27
Maurice Lecoq	Rifle Gras Model Kneeling or Standing, 200 metres	27	154	27
Jean Fouconnier	Rifle Gras Model Kneeling or Standing, 200 metres	27	154	27
Hermann Martin	Rifle Gras Model Kneeling or Standing, 200 metres	27	154	27
Raoul de Boigne	Rifle Kneeling or Standing, 300 metres	30	232	3rd place, bronze medalist(s)
Léon Moreaux	Rifle Kneeling or Standing, 300 metres	30	231	4
Maurice Lecoq	Rifle Kneeling or Standing, 300 metres	30	224	5
Maurice Fauré	Rifle Kneeling or Standing, 300 metres	30	216	10
Jean Fouconnier	Rifle Kneeling or Standing, 300 metres	30	193	16
Hermann Martin	Rifle Kneeling or Standing, 300 metres	30	184	22
Maurice Fauré	Trap single shot 16 metres	n/a	22	4
Raoul de Boigne	Trap single shot 16 metres	n/a	did not finish	
Jean Fouconnier	Trap single shot 16 metres	n/a	did not finish	
Maurice Fauré	Trap double shot 14 metres	n/a	9	5
Jean Fouconnier	Trap double shot 14 metres	n/a	8	6
Raoul de Boigne	Trap double shot 14 metres	n/a	did not finish	

== Swimming ==
Athlete	Events	Heat		Final	
Athlete	Events	Result	Rank	Result	Rank
Albert Bouguin	100 metres freestyle	Unknown	5	did not advance	
Albert Bouguin	One mile freestyle	n/a		did not finish	
Paul Vasseur	One mile freestyle	n/a		did not finish	

== Tennis ==
Player	Event	Round One	Round Two	Quarterfinals	Semifinals	Finals	Rank
Player	Event	Opposition Score	Opposition Score	Opposition Score	Opposition Score	Opposition Score	Rank
Max Decugis	Men's Singles	Karydias (GRE); W 6–0, 6–0	Kasdaglis (GRE); W 6–1, 6–0	Zarifis (GRE); W 6–1, 6–0	Kessler (NED); W 6–0, 6–0	Germot (FRA); W 6–1, 7–9, 6–4, 6–1	1st place, gold medalist(s)
Maurice Germot	Men's Singles	Agelastos (GRE); W Walkover	Z.Žemla (BOH); W 3–6, 6–1, 6–2	Beukema (NED); W 6–4, 6–2	Scheurleer (NED); W 6–4, 6–1	Decugis (FRA); L 1–6, 9–7, 4–6, 1–6	2nd place, silver medalist(s)
Jim Giraud	Men's Singles	de Martino (ITA); W Walkover	Beukema (NED); L 4–6, 6–3, 5–7	did not advance			9
Max Decugis; Maurice Germot	Men's Doubles	Bye	N/A	Beukema / Scheurleer (NED); W 6–4, 6–0	Z.Žemla / L.Žemla (BOH); W 6–3, 6–4	Ballis / Kasdaglis (GRE); W 6–3, 9–7, 3–6, 0–6, 6–0	1st place, gold medalist(s)
Marie Decugis; Max Decugis	Mixed Doubles	Bye	N/A		Marinou / Simiriotis (GRE); W 8–6, 6–3	Matsa / Kasdaglis (GRE); W 6–3, 7–5	1st place, gold medalist(s)
Marie Decugis	Women's Singles	Matsa (GRE); L Withdrew	N/A		did not advance		5

== Weightlifting ==
Athlete	Event	Weight	Rank
Alexandre Maspoli	One hand lift	70.75	4
Alexandre Maspoli	Two hand lift	129.5	3rd place, bronze medalist(s)

== Wrestling ==
Greco-Roman

Athlete	Event	Round 1	Quarterfinals	Semifinals	Final Group		
Athlete	Event	Opposition Result	Opposition Result	Opposition Result	Opposition Result	Opposition Result	Rank
Paul Boghaert	Middleweight	Weckman (FIN); L	did not advance				8
Georges Juery	Middleweight	Goldbach (AUT); L	did not advance				8
