= United States at the 1906 Intercalated Games =

- Flag of the United States
- IOC code: USA
- NOC: United States Olympic Committee

in Athens
- Competitors: 38 in 5 sports
- Flag bearer: Matthew Halpin (Team manager)
- Medals Ranked 2nd: Gold 12 Silver 6 Bronze 6 Total 24

Summer appearances
- 1896; 1900; 1904; 1908; 1912; 1920; 1924; 1928; 1932; 1936; 1948; 1952; 1956; 1960; 1964; 1968; 1972; 1976; 1980; 1984; 1988; 1992; 1996; 2000; 2004; 2008; 2012; 2016; 2020; 2024; 2028

Winter appearances
- 1924; 1928; 1932; 1936; 1948; 1952; 1956; 1960; 1964; 1968; 1972; 1976; 1980; 1984; 1988; 1992; 1994; 1998; 2002; 2006; 2010; 2014; 2018; 2022; 2026

The United States competed at the 1906 Intercalated Games in Athens, Greece. 38 athletes, all men, competed in 28 events in 5 sports.

== Athletics ==
Track

Athlete	Events	Heat		Semifinals		Final	
Athlete	Events	Result	Rank	Result	Rank	Result	Rank
Archie Hahn	100 metres	12.0	1 Q	11.4	1 Q	11.2	1st place, gold medalist(s)
Fay Moulton	100 metres	11.8	1 Q	11.2	1 Q	Unknown	2nd place, silver medalist(s)
William Eaton	100 metres	11.6	1 Q	11.6	1 Q	Unknown	4
Lawson Robertson	100 metres	11.4	1 Q	Unknown	2 Q	Unknown	5
William Schick	100 metres	12.2	1 Q	Unknown	3	did not advance	
Myer Prinstein	100 metres	Unknown	2 Q	did not start		did not advance	
George Queyrouze	100 metres	did not finish		did not advance			
Paul Pilgrim	400 metres	55.2	1 Q	n/a		53.2	1st place, gold medalist(s)
Harry Hillman	400 metres	54.8	2 q	n/a		Unknown	4
Charles Bacon	400 metres	56.2	1 Q	n/a		Unknown	5
Fay Moulton	400 metres	54.8	1 Q	n/a		Unknown	6
Jim Lightbody	400 metres	53.0	2 q	Unknown	Unknown	did not advance	
Lawson Robertson	400 metres	Unknown	2 q	Unknown	Unknown	did not advance	
George Queyrouze	400 metres	Unknown	3	did not advance			
Eli Parsons	400 metres	Unknown	4	did not advance			
Howard Valentine	400 metres	Unknown	Unknown	did not advance			
Paul Pilgrim	800 metres	2:06.6	1 Q	n/a		2:01.5	1st place, gold medalist(s)
Jim Lightbody	800 metres	2:05.4	1 Q	n/a		Unknown	2nd place, silver medalist(s)
Charles Bacon	800 metres	Unknown	2 Q	n/a		Unknown	6
Eli Parsons	800 metres	Unknown	2 Q	n/a		Unknown	7
Howard Valentine	800 metres	Unknown	3	n/a		did not advance	
James Sullivan	800 metres	Unknown	Unknown	n/a		did not advance	
Jim Lightbody	1500 metres	4:19.4	1 Q	n/a		4:12.0	1st place, gold medalist(s)
James Sullivan	1500 metres	Unknown	3Q	n/a		Unknown	5
George Bonhag	1500 metres	Unknown	3 Q	n/a		Unknown	6
Harvey Cohn	1500 metres	Unknown	4 Q	n/a		Unknown	8
George Bonhag	5 mile	n/a				Unknown	4
Harvey Cohn	5 mile	n/a				Unknown	Unknown
William Frank	5 mile	n/a				Unknown	Unknown
William Frank	Marathon	n/a				3-00:46.8	3rd place, bronze medalist(s)
Joseph Forshaw	Marathon	n/a				Unknown	12
Michael Spring	Marathon	n/a				did not finish	
Robert Fowler	Marathon	n/a				did not finish	
Robert Leavitt	110 metres hurdles	16.5	1 Q	n/a		16.2	1st place, gold medalist(s)
Hugo Friend	110 metres hurdles	16.8	1 Q	n/a		Unknown	4
Harry Hillman	110 metres hurdles	Unknown	3	n/a		did not advance	
George Bonhag	1500 metre walk	n/a				7:12.6	1st place, gold medalist(s)

Field

Athlete	Events	Final	
Athlete	Events	Result	Rank
Herbert Kerrigan	High jump	1.725	3rd place, bronze medalist(s)
Ray Ewry	Standing high jump	1.560	1st place, gold medalist(s)
Martin Sheridan	Standing high jump	1.400	2nd place, silver medalist(s)
Lawson Robertson	Standing high jump	1.400	2nd place, silver medalist(s)
Edward Glover	Pole Vault	3.350	3rd place, bronze medalist(s)
Herbert Kerrigan	Pole Vault	2.750	10
Myer Prinstein	Long jump	7.200	1st place, gold medalist(s)
Hugo Friend	Long jump	6.960	3rd place, bronze medalist(s)
Thomas Cronan	Long jump	6.185	6
Francis Connolly	Long jump	5.280	25
James Connolly	Long jump	No Mark	
Ray Ewry	Standing long jump	3.300	1st place, gold medalist(s)
Martin Sheridan	Standing long jump	3.095	2nd place, silver medalist(s)
Lawson Robertson	Standing long jump	3.050	3rd place, bronze medalist(s)
Herbert Kerrigan	Standing long jump	2.830	10
Hugo Friend	Standing long jump	No Mark	
Thomas Cronan	Triple jump	13.700	3rd place, bronze medalist(s)
Francis Connolly	Triple jump	12.750	6
Myer Prinstein	Triple jump	12.270	11
James Connolly	Triple jump	No Mark	
Martin Sheridan	Shot put	12.325	1st place, gold medalist(s)
Robert W. Edgren	Shot put	Unknown	Unknown
Martin Sheridan	Stone throw	19.035	2nd place, silver medalist(s)
Martin Sheridan	Discus	41.460 WR	1st place, gold medalist(s)
Robert W. Edgren	Discus	Unknown	Unknown
Martin Sheridan	Discus Greek style	31.500	4
Lawson Robertson	Pentathlon (Ancient)	36	6
Daniel Sullivan	Pentathlon (Ancient)	54	21
Martin Sheridan	Pentathlon (Ancient)	did not finish	

== Diving ==
Athlete	Event	Points	Rank
Frank Bornamann	10 m platform	did not finish	

== Swimming ==
Athlete	Events	Heat		Final	
Athlete	Events	Result	Rank	Result	Rank
Charles Daniels	100 metres freestyle	1:17.6	1 Q	1:13.0 OR	1st place, gold medalist(s)
Marquard Schwarz	100 metres freestyle	Unknown	3 Q	Unknown	7
Frank Bornamann	400 metres freestyle	n/a		did not finish	
Joseph Spencer	One mile freestyle	n/a		34:50.0	9
Frank Bornamann; Joseph Spencer; Marquard Schwarz; Charles Daniels	4 x 250 metres freestyle relay	n/a		Unknown	4

== Tennis ==
Player	Event	Round One	Round Two	Quarterfinals	Semifinals	Finals	Rank
Player	Event	Opposition Score	Opposition Score	Opposition Score	Opposition Score	Opposition Score	Rank
Robert Schauffler	Men's Singles	Bye	Georgios Simiriotis (GRE); L 1–6, 6–2, 2–6	did not advance			9
Homer Byington	Men's Singles	Ioannis Ballis (GRE); L 1–6, 2–6	did not advance				14
Robert Schauffler; Homer Byington	Men's Doubles	Bye	N/A	Zdenek Žemla; Ladislav Žemla (BOH); L 3–6, 3–6	did not advance		5

== Wrestling ==
Greco-Roman

Athlete	Event	Round 1	Semifinals	Final Group		
Athlete	Event	Opposition Result	Opposition Result	Opposition Result	Opposition Result	Rank
Isidor Niflot	Lightweight	Holubán (HUN); L	did not advance			7
Daniel Sullivan	Middleweight	Sauveur (BEL); L	did not advance			8
