= Netherlands at the 1906 Intercalated Games =

Netherlands at the Olympics

- Flag of the Netherlands
- IOC code: NED

in Athens
- Competitors: 16 in 2 sports
- Medals Ranked 14th: Gold 0 Silver 1 Bronze 2 Total 3

Summer appearances
- 1900; 1904; 1908; 1912; 1920; 1924; 1928; 1932; 1936; 1948; 1952; 1956; 1960; 1964; 1968; 1972; 1976; 1980; 1984; 1988; 1992; 1996; 2000; 2004; 2008; 2012; 2016; 2020; 2024; 2028

Winter appearances
- 1928; 1932; 1936; 1948; 1952; 1956; 1960; 1964; 1968; 1972; 1976; 1980; 1984; 1988; 1992; 1994; 1998; 2002; 2006; 2010; 2014; 2018; 2022; 2026

Netherlands competed at the 1906 Intercalated Games in Athens, Greece. Sixteen athletes, all men, competed in eight events in two sports.

== Medalists ==
Medal	Name	Sport	Event	Date
Silver	George van Rossem	Fencing	Men's sabre, three hits	1 May
Bronze	Hendrik van Blijenburgh	Fencing	Men's épée	25 April
Bronze	James, Baron Melvill van Carnbée; Johannes Osten; George van Rossem; Maurits van Löben Sels	Fencing	Men's team sabre	25 April

== Fencing ==
Thirteen fencers competed for the Netherlands, between them winning an individual silver, individual bronze and a team bronze.

Athlete	Event	Rank
Simon Okker	Men's foil	5
Hendrik van der Grinten	Men's foil	3T p5 r1/3
George van Rossem	Men's foil	AC p1 r1/3
Félix Vigeveno	Men's foil	AC p2 r1/3
Maurits van Löben Sels	Men's foil	AC p4 r1/3
Willem Hubert van Blijenburgh	Men's foil	AC p6 r1/3
Arie de Jong	Men's foil	AC p7 r1/3
Jetze Doorman	Men's foil	AC p7 r1/3
Gabriël Vigeveno	Men's foil	AC p7 r1/3
Hendrik van Blijenburgh	Men's épée	3rd place, bronze medalist(s)
Félix Vigeveno	Men's épée	4
Maurits van Löben Sels	Men's épée	6
Jetze Doorman	Men's épée	4 p1 r2/3
James, Baron Melvill van Carnbée	Men's épée	AC p2 r2/3
Hendrik van der Grinten	Men's épée	AC p2 r1/3
Arie de Jong	Men's épée	AC p5 r1/3
Johannes Osten	Men's épée	AC p7 r1/3
Willem Hubert van Blijenburgh	Men's épée	AC p7 r1/3
Gabriël Vigeveno	Men's épée	AC p7 r1/3
Frits Koen	Men's épée	AC p7 r1/3
Willem Hubert van Blijenburgh; Jetze Doorman; Hendrik van der Grinten; Arie de Jong	Men's team épée	5T
James, Baron Melvill van Carnbée	Men's sabre	AC p1 r2/3
George van Rossem	Men's sabre	AC p2 r2/3
Hendrik van Blijenburgh	Men's sabre	AC p2 r2/3
Jetze Doorman	Men's sabre	AC p1 r1/3
Maurits van Löben Sels	Men's sabre	AC p2 r1/3
Johannes Osten	Men's sabre	AC p3 r1/3
Arie de Jong	Men's sabre	AC p4 r1/3
Hendrik van der Grinten	Men's sabre	AC p5 r1/3
Willem Hubert van Blijenburgh	Men's sabre	AC p6 r1/3
George van Rossem	Men's sabre, three hits	2nd place, silver medalist(s)
Maurits van Löben Sels	Men's sabre, three hits	AC r2/2
Arie de Jong	Men's sabre, three hits	AC r2/2
Hendrik van Blijenburgh	Men's sabre, three hits	AC p1 r1/2
James, Baron Melvill van Carnbée	Men's sabre, three hits	AC p1 r1/2
Willem Hubert van Blijenburgh	Men's sabre, three hits	AC p2 r1/2
Johannes Osten	Men's sabre, three hits	AC p1 r1/2 (DNF)
James, Baron Melvill van Carnbée; Johannes Osten; George van Rossem; Maurits van Löben Sels	Men's team sabre	3rd place, bronze medalist(s)

== Tennis ==
Three tennis players represented the Netherlands.

Athlete	Event	Round of 32	Round of 16	Quarterfinals	Semifinals	Final	
Athlete	Event	Opposition Result	Opposition Result	Opposition Result	Opposition Result	Opposition Result	Rank
Guus Kessler	Men's singles	Ketseas (GRE); W Walkover	Kasdaglis (GRE); W Walkover	Georgiadis (GRE); W Walkover	Decugis (FRA); L 0–6, 0–6	Did not advance	4T
Gerard Scheurleer	Men's singles	Zarifis (GRE); W 6–0, 3–6, 6–2	Ballis (GRE); W 6–1, 6–4	Simiriotis (GRE); W 6–3, 8–6	Germot (FRA); L 4–6, 1–6	Did not advance	4T
Karel Beukema	Men's singles	Žemla (BOH); W 6–0, 6–4	Giraud (FRA); W 6–4, 3–6, 7–5	Germot (FRA); L 4–6, 2–6	did not advance		6T
Karel Beukema; Gerard Scheurleer	Men's doubles	—N/a	Bye	Decugis / Germot (FRA); L 4–6, 0–6	did not advance		5T
