= Tennis at the 1906 Intercalated Games – Men's singles =

Men's singles tennis at the 1906 Intercalated Games
- Venue: Athens Lawn Tennis Club
- Date: 23–28 April
- Competitors: 29 from 7 nations

Medalists
1st place, gold medalist(s)		Max Decugis	France
2nd place, silver medalist(s)		Maurice Germot	France
3rd place, bronze medalist(s)		Zdeněk Žemla	Bohemia

The men's singles was one of four lawn tennis events on the Tennis at the 1906 Intercalated Games programme. The tournament was played on clay courts at the Athens Lawn Tennis Club.

Frenchman Max Decugis won the gold medal by defeating his compatriot Maurice Germot in four sets.

The silver and bronze medals were awarded on the basis of the best performances against the winner or runner-up instead of the usual losing finalist or winner of a play-off between the losing semi-finalists. Therefore, the bronze medal was awarded to Zdeněk Žemla, who had won a set against silver medalist Maurice Germot in the second round.

== Draw ==
Key

- Q = Qualifier
- WC = Wild card
- LL = Lucky loser
- Alt = Alternate
- ITF = ITF entry
- PR = Protected ranking
- SR = Special ranking
- SE = Special exempt
- JE = Junior exempt
- JR = Junior Accelerator Programme entrant
- CO = College Accelerator Programme entrant
- NG = Next Gen Accelerator Program entrant
- w/o = Walkover
- r = Retired
- d = Defaulted

=== Finals ===
Semifinals
Guus Kessler (NED)	0	0
Max Decugis (FRA)	6	6
Maurice Germot (FRA)	6	6
Gerard Scheurleer (NED)	4	1

Final (gold-medal match)
Max Decugis (FRA)	6	7	6	6
Maurice Germot (FRA)	1	9	4	1

=== Top half ===
First round
A Georgiadis (GRE)
J Whittal (GBR)	w/o
D Kasdaglis (GRE)
P Manesis (GRE)	w/o
G Kessler (NED)
I Ketseas (GRE)	w/o
J Žemla (BOH)	6	7
V Károly (BOH)	4	5
L Zarifis (GRE)
D Whittal (GBR)	w/o
M Decugis (FRA)	6	6
N Karidias (GRE)	0	0
X Kasdaglis (GRE)
H Melis (GRE)	w/o

Second round
H Giraud (FRA)	w/o
A Georgiadis (GRE)
D Kasdaglis (GRE)	w/o
G Kessler (NED)
J Žemla (BOH)	w/o
L Zarifis (GRE)
M Decugis (FRA)	6	6
X Kasdaglis (GRE)	1	0

Quarterfinals
A Georgiadis (GRE)	w/o
G Kessler (NED)
L Zarifis (GRE)	1	0
M Decugis (FRA)	6	6

Semifinals
G Kessler (NED)	0	0
M Decugis (FRA)	6	6

=== Bottom half ===
First round
Z Žemla (BOH)
J Millet (FRA)	w/o
M Germot (FRA)
M Agelastos (GRE)	w/o
J Giraud (FRA)
G de Martino (ITA)	w/o
K Beukema (NED)	6	6
L Žemla (BOH)	0	4
G Scheurleer (NED)	6	3	6
N Zarifis (GRE)	0	6	2
I Ballis (GRE)	6	6
H Byington (USA)	1	2

Second round
Z Žemla (BOH)	6	1	2
M Germot (FRA)	3	6	6
J Giraud (FRA)	4	6	5
K Beukema (NED)	6	3	7
G Scheurleer (NED)	6	6
I Ballis (GRE)	1	4
G Simiriotis (GRE)	6	2	6
R Schauffler (USA)	1	6	2

Quarterfinals
M Germot (FRA)	6	6
K Beukema (NED)	4	2
G Scheurleer (NED)	6	8
G Simiriotis (GRE)	3	6

Semifinals
M Germot (FRA)	6	6
G Scheurleer (NED)	4	1
