= Tennis at the 1906 Intercalated Games – Men's doubles =

Men's doubles tennis at the 1906 Intercalated Games
- Venue: Athens Lawn Tennis Club
- Date: 23–28 April
- Competitors: 12 teams from 7 nations

Medalists
1st place, gold medalist(s)		Max Decugis; Maurice Germot	France
2nd place, silver medalist(s)		Ioannis Ballis; Xenophon Kasdaglis	Greece
3rd place, bronze medalist(s)		Ladislav Žemla; Zdeněk Žemla	Bohemia

The men's doubles was one of four lawn tennis events on the Tennis at the 1906 Intercalated Games programme. The tournament was played on clay courts at the Athens Lawn Tennis Club.

Frenchmen Max Decugis and Maurice Germot won the gold medal by defeating Greeks Ioannis Ballis and Xenophon Kasdaglis in five sets.

This is one of two events that featured a specific match to determine the bronze medal winner (the other being the women's doubles), in which Bohemians Ladislav Žemla and Zdeněk Žemla defeated Greeks Georgios Simiriotis and Nikolaos Zarifis in straight sets.

== Draw ==
Key

- Q = Qualifier
- WC = Wild card
- LL = Lucky loser
- Alt = Alternate
- ITF = ITF entry
- PR = Protected ranking
- SR = Special ranking
- SE = Special exempt
- JE = Junior exempt
- JR = Junior Accelerator Programme entrant
- CO = College Accelerator Programme entrant
- NG = Next Gen Accelerator Program entrant
- w/o = Walkover
- r = Retired
- d = Defaulted

=== Draw ===
First Round
L Žemla (BOH); Z Žemla (BOH)	w/o
A Goergiadis (GRE); D Syriotis (GRE)
H Byington (USA); R Schauffler (USA)	w/o
J Giraud (FRA); J Whittal (GBR)
H Giraud (FRA); D Whittal (GBR)
P Manesis (GRE); H Melis (GRE)	w/o
V Károly (HUN); J Žemla (BOH)
I Ballis (GRE); X Kasdaglis (GRE)	w/o

Quarterfinals
M Decugis (FRA); M Germot (FRA)	6	6
K Beukema (NED); G Scheurleer (NED)	4	0
L Žemla (BOH); Z Žemla (BOH)	6	6
H Byington (USA); R Schauffler (USA)	3	3
P Manesis (GRE); H Melis (GRE)
I Ballis (GRE); X Kasdaglis (GRE)	w/o
I Ketseas (GRE); G Skouzes (GRE)	7	1
G Simiriotis (GRE); N Zarifis (GRE)	9	6

Semifinals
M Decugis (FRA); M Germot (FRA)	6	6
L Žemla (BOH); Z Žemla (BOH)	3	4
I Ballis (GRE); X Kasdaglis (GRE)	7	6
G Simiriotis (GRE); N Zarifis (GRE)	5	4

Gold Medal Match
M Decugis (FRA); M Germot (FRA)	6	9	3	0	6
I Ballis (GRE); X Kasdaglis (GRE)	3	7	6	6	0
Bronze Medal Match
L Žemla (BOH); Z Žemla (BOH)	6	6
G Simiriotis (GRE); N Zarifis (GRE)	2	3
