= Tennis at the 1906 Intercalated Games – Mixed doubles =

Mixed doubles tennis at the 1906 Intercalated Games
- Venue: Athens Lawn Tennis Club
- Date: 23–28 April
- Competitors: 5 teams from 2 nations

Medalists
1st place, gold medalist(s)		Marie Decugis; Max Decugis	France
2nd place, silver medalist(s)		Sophia Marinou; Georgios Simiriotis	Greece
3rd place, bronze medalist(s)		Aspasia Matsa; Xenophon Kasdaglis	Greece

The mixed doubles was one of four lawn tennis events on the Tennis at the 1906 Intercalated Games programme. The tournament was played on clay courts at the Athens Lawn Tennis Club. Frenchmen Marie Decugis and Max Decugis won the gold medal.

Uniquely, the silver and bronze medals were awarded on the basis of the best performance against the gold and silver medalists, instead of the usual losing finalist or winner of a play-off between the losing semi-finalists.

Thus, Greek Aspasia Matsa and Xenophon Kasdaglis, who were beaten by the French team in the final, actually won the bronze medal. They won eight games, whereas Greeks Sophia Marinou and Georgios Simiriotis won nine games in their loss to the French team in the semifinal (accordingly, they won the silver medal).

== Draw ==
=== Key ===
- Q = Qualifier
- WC = Wild card
- LL = Lucky loser
- Alt = Alternate
- ITF = ITF entry
- PR = Protected ranking
- SR = Special ranking
- SE = Special exempt
- JE = Junior exempt
- JR = Junior Accelerator Programme entrant
- CO = College Accelerator Programme entrant
- NG = Next Gen Accelerator Program entrant
- w/o = Walkover
- r = Retired
- d = Defaulted

=== Draw ===
First Round			Semifinals			Gold Medal Match
			Marie Decugis (FRA); Max Decugis (FRA)	8	6
Sofia Marinou (GRE); Georgios Simiriotis (GRE)	6	6	Sofia Marinou (GRE); Georgios Simiriotis (GRE)	6	3
Euphrosine Paspati (GRE); Dionysios Kasdaglis (GRE)	2	2				Marie Decugis (FRA); Max Decugis (FRA)	6	7
						Aspasia Matsa (GRE); Xenophon Kasdaglis (GRE)	3	5
			Aspasia Matsa (GRE); Xenophon Kasdaglis (GRE)	6	6
			Esmée Simirioti (GRE); Nikolaos Zarifis (GRE)	1	4
