= Athletics at the 1906 Intercalated Games =

At the 1906 Summer Olympics in Athens, 21 competitive events in athletics were held. A total of 65 medals (21 gold, 23 silver, 21 bronze) were awarded. Now called the Intercalated Games, the 1906 Games are no longer considered as an official Olympic Games by the International Olympic Committee (IOC).

The marathon distance was 41.775 km according to a contemporary Greek newspaper. The pentathlon event in the 1906 Games consisted of a standing long jump, discus throw (ancient style), javelin throw, 192 metre run, and a Greco-Roman wrestling match. A stone throw was held with a 6.4 kg weight.

== Medal summary ==
Event	Gold		Silver		Bronze	
100 metres	Archie Hahn; United States	11.2	Fay Moulton; United States	1 yd behind winner	Nigel Barker; Australia	1 ft behind runner-up
400 metres	Paul Pilgrim; United States	53.2	Wyndham Halswelle; Great Britain	4 yd behind winner	Nigel Barker; Australia	2 yd behind runner-up
800 metres	Paul Pilgrim; United States	2:01.5	Jim Lightbody; United States	2 ft behind winner	Wyndham Halswelle; Great Britain	10 yd behind runner-up
1500 metres	Jim Lightbody; United States	4:12.0	John McGough; Great Britain	4:12.6	Kristian Hellström; Sweden	4:13.4
5 miles	Henry Hawtrey; Great Britain	26:11.8	John Svanberg; Sweden	26:19.4	Edward Dahl; Sweden	26:26.2
Marathon	Billy Sherring; Canada	2:51:23.6	John Svanberg; Sweden	2:58:20.8	William Frank; United States	3:00:46.8
110 metre hurdles	Robert Leavitt; United States	16.2	Alfred Healey; Great Britain	1 ft behind winner	Vincent Duncker; Germany	almost same time as runner-up
1500 metres walk	George Bonhag; United States	7:12.6	Donald Linden; Canada	7:19.8	Konstantinos Spetsiotis; Greece	7:22.0
3000 metres walk	György Sztantics; Hungary	15:13.2	Hermann Müller; Germany	15:20.0	Georgios Saridakis; Greece	15:33.0
High jump	Con Leahy; Great Britain	1.775 m	Lajos Gönczy; Hungary	1.750 m	Themistoklis Diakidis; Greece Herbert Kerrigan; United States	1.725 m
Standing high jump	Ray Ewry; United States	1.560 m	Léon Dupont; Belgium Lawson Robertson; United States Martin Sheridan; United States	1.400 m	Not awarded	
Pole vault	Fernand Gonder; France	3.500 m OR	Bruno Söderström; Sweden	3.400 m	Edward Glover; United States	3.350 m
Long jump	Myer Prinstein; United States	7.200 m	Peter O'Connor; Great Britain	7.025 m	Hugo Friend; United States	6.960 m
Standing long jump	Ray Ewry; United States	3.300 m	Martin Sheridan; United States	3.095 m	Lawson Robertson; United States	3.050 m
Triple jump	Peter O'Connor; Great Britain	14.075 m	Con Leahy; Great Britain	13.980 m	Thomas Cronan; United States	13.700 m
Shot put	Martin Sheridan; United States	12.325 m	Mihály Dávid; Hungary	11.830 m	Eric Lemming; Sweden	11.260 m
Discus throw	Martin Sheridan; United States	41.460 m WR	Nikolaos Georgantas; Greece	38.060 m	Verner Järvinen; Finland	36.820 m
Greek discus throw	Verner Järvinen; Finland	35.170 m	Nikolaos Georgantas; Greece	32.800 m	István Mudin; Hungary	31.910 m
Javelin throw	Eric Lemming; Sweden	53.900 m	Knut Lindberg; Sweden	45.170 m	Bruno Söderström; Sweden	44.920 m
Stone throw	Nikolaos Georgantas; Greece	19.925 m	Martin Sheridan; United States	19.035 m	Michalis Dorizas; Greece	18.585 m
Pentathlon	Hjalmar Mellander; Sweden	24 pts	István Mudin; Hungary	25 pts	Eric Lemming; Sweden	29 pts

== Postcards of athletics in the 1906 Olympics ==
A number of postcards, then at its peak, were published by various printhouses. The following were printed in Corfu, Greece, by the Aspiotis brothers.

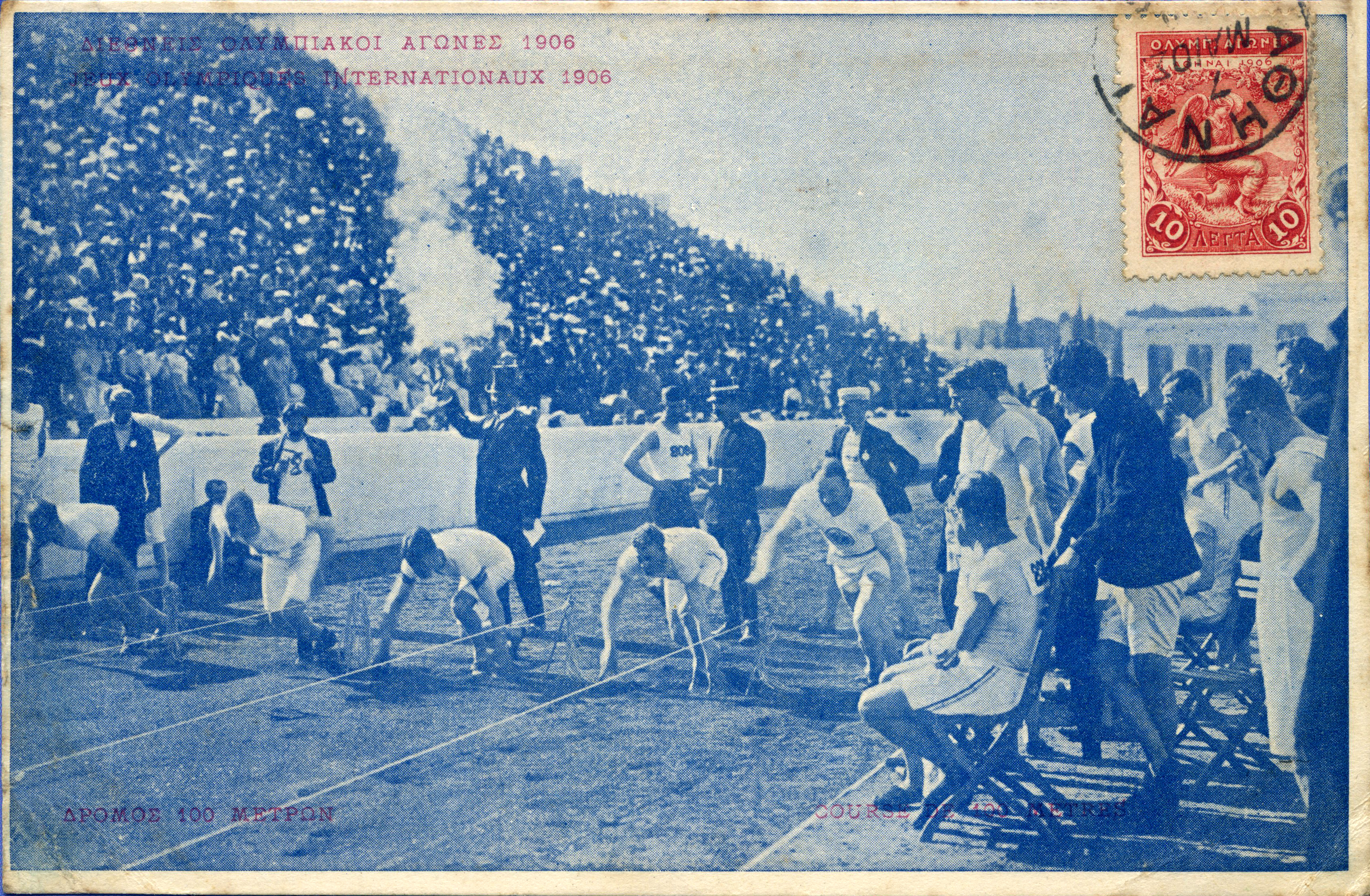
100 metres run

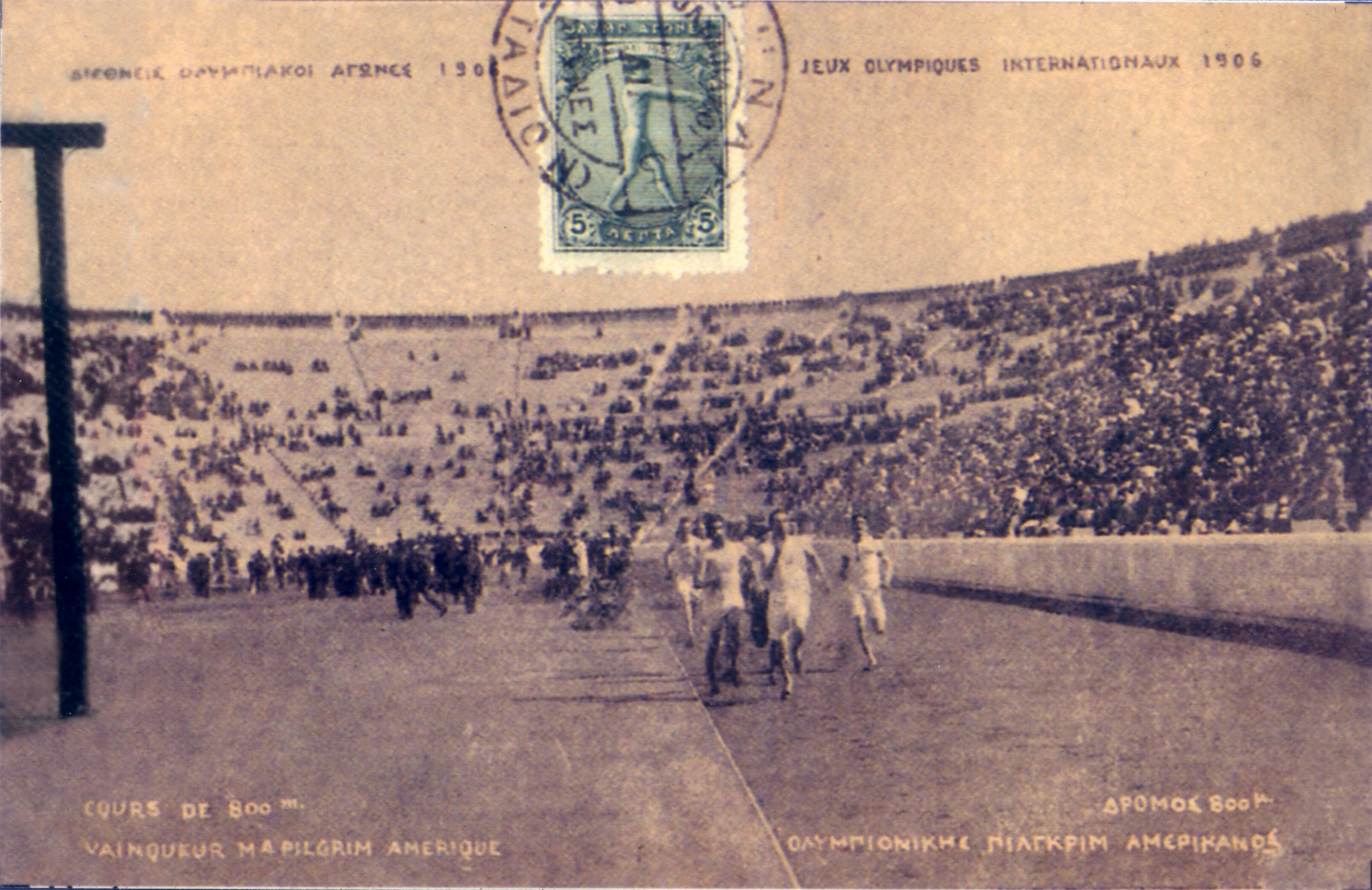
800 metres run. Winner Pilgrim

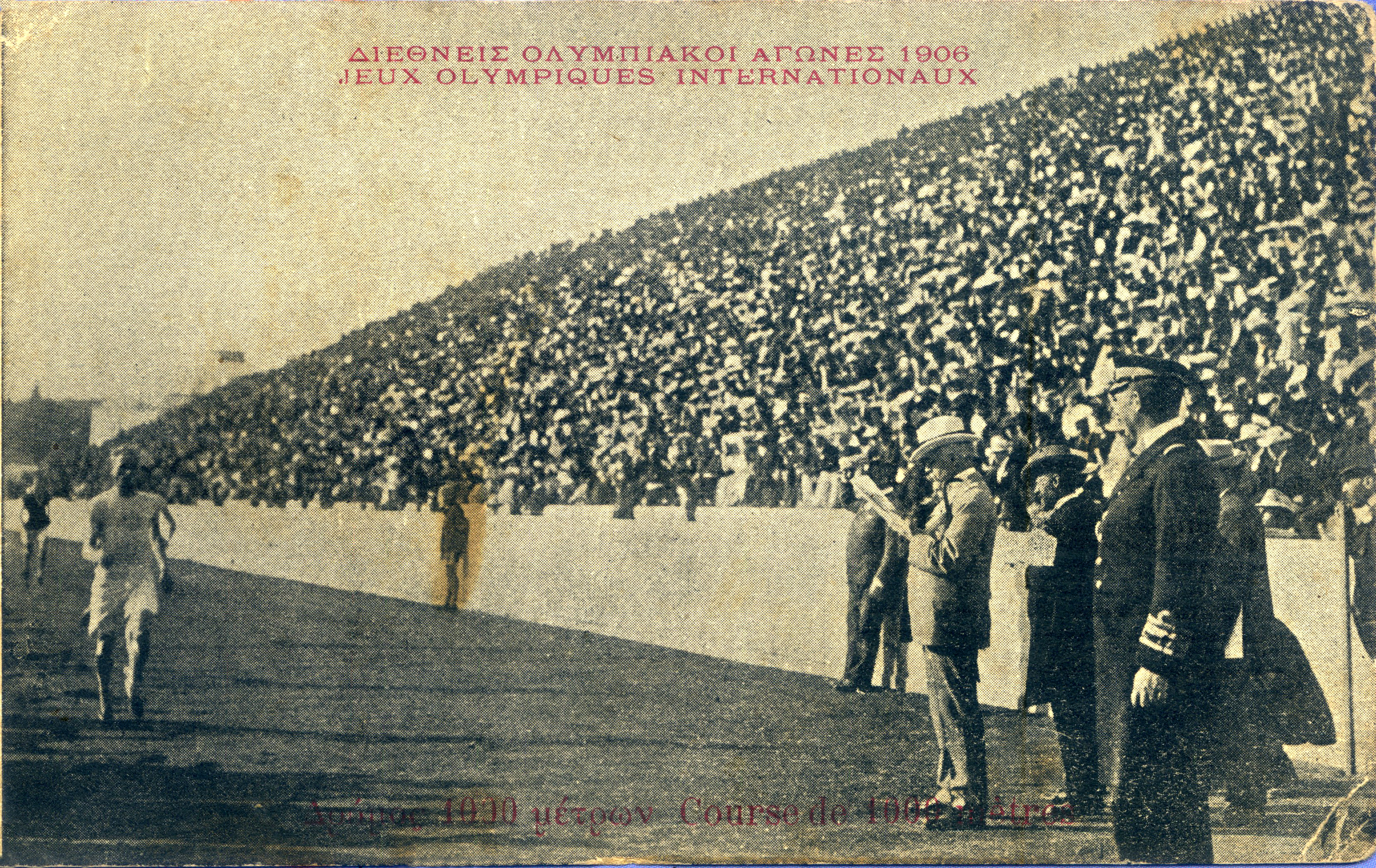
1000 metres run

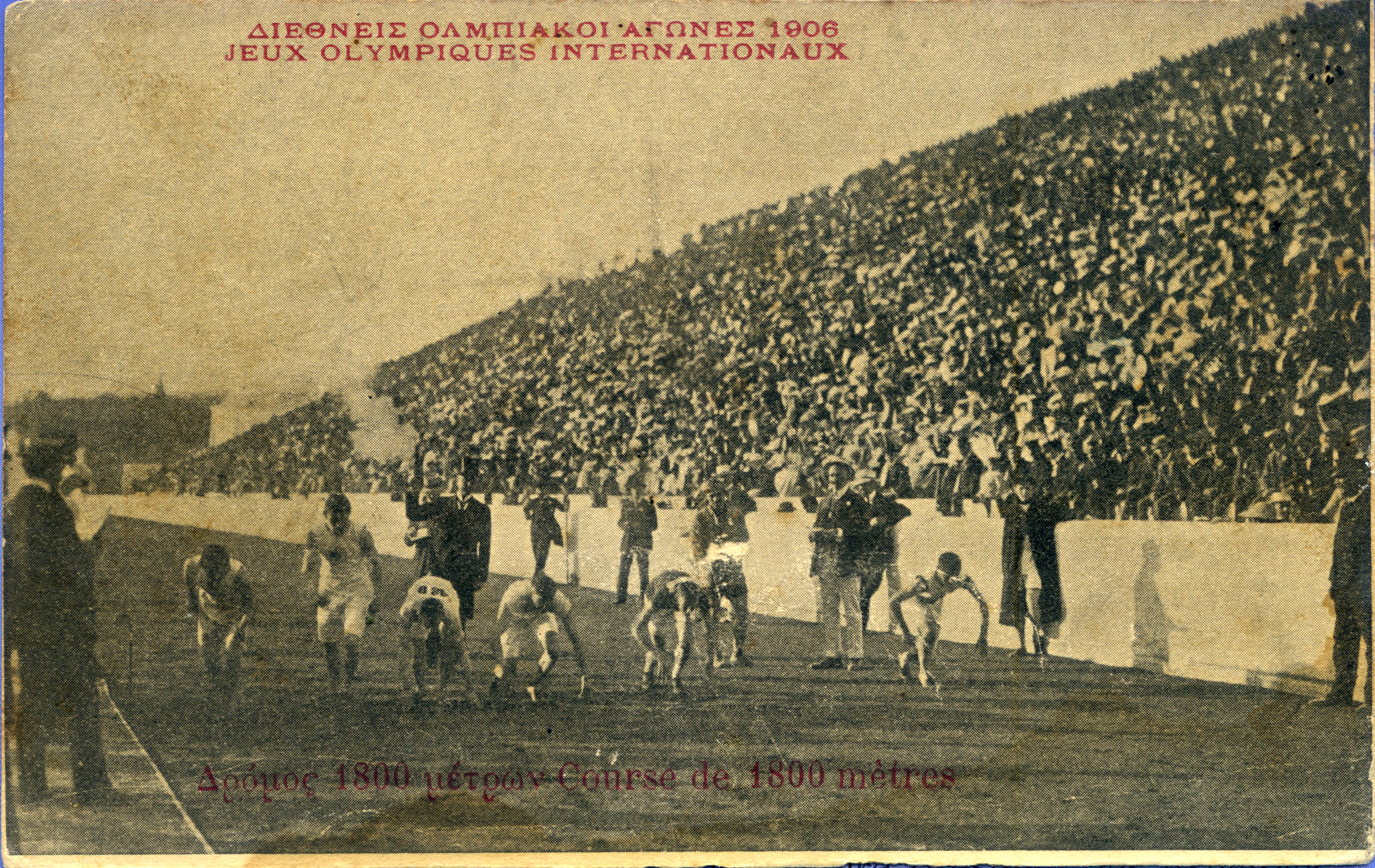
1500 metres run

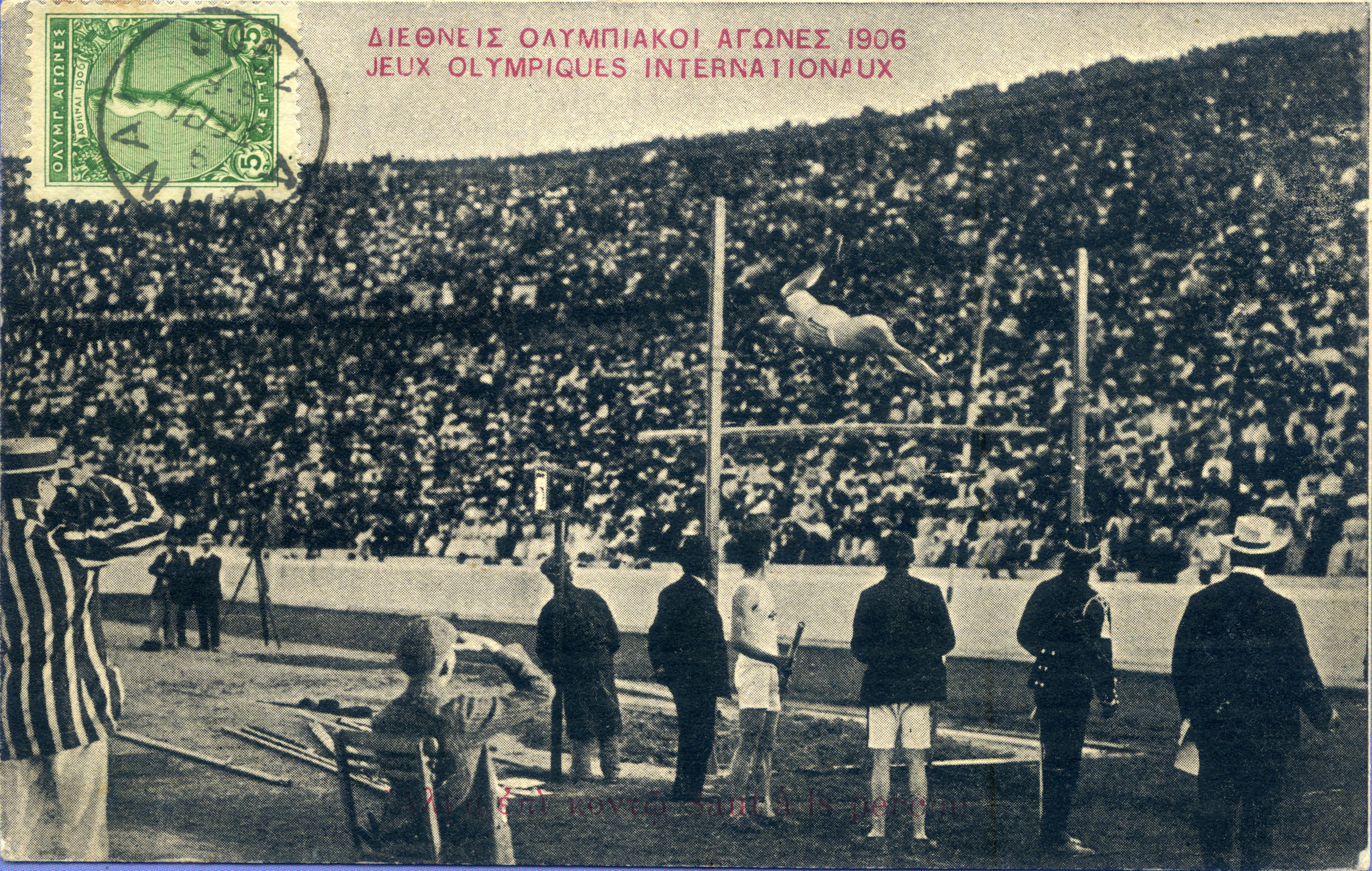
Pole vault

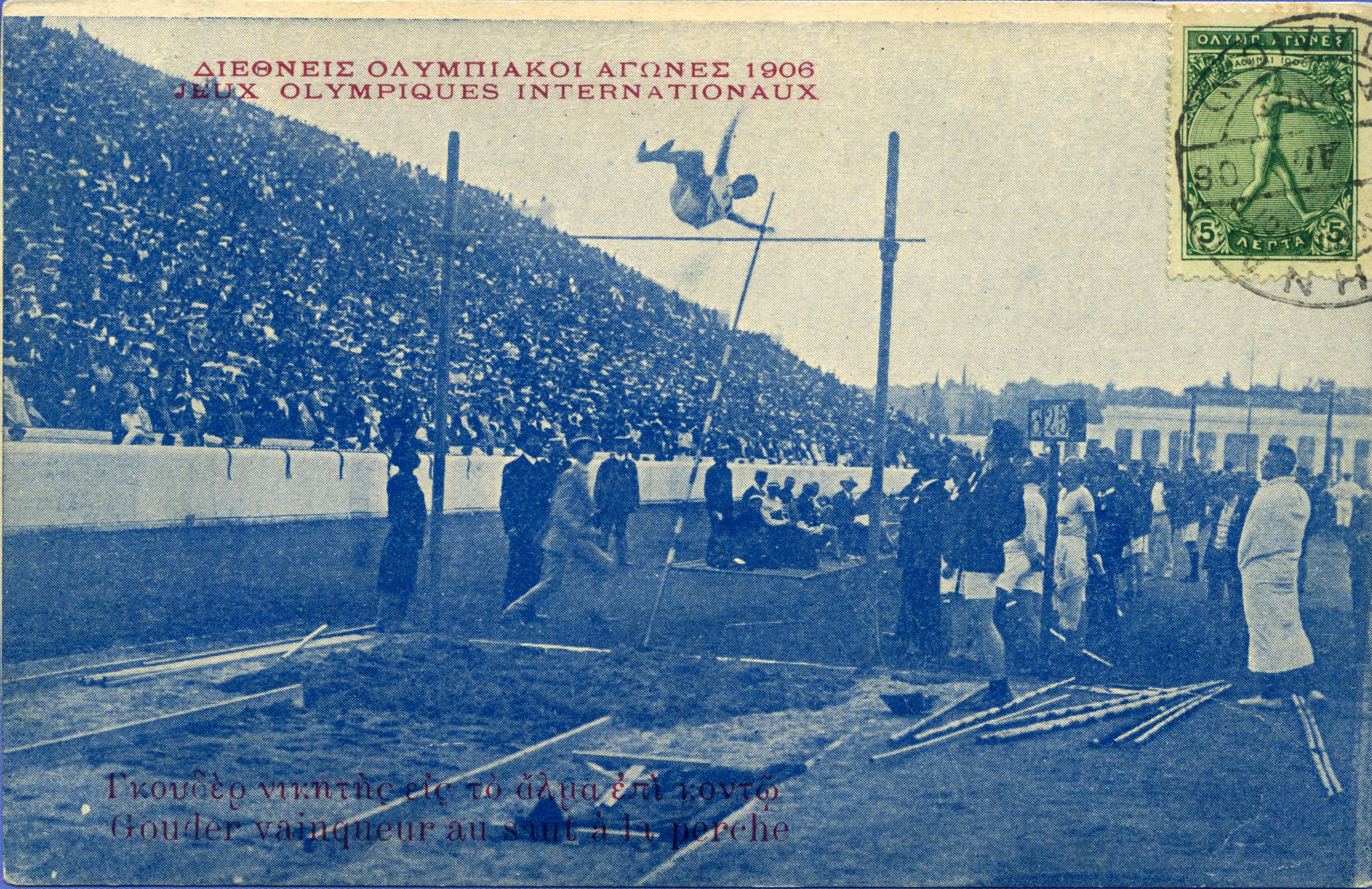
Pole vault winner Gonder

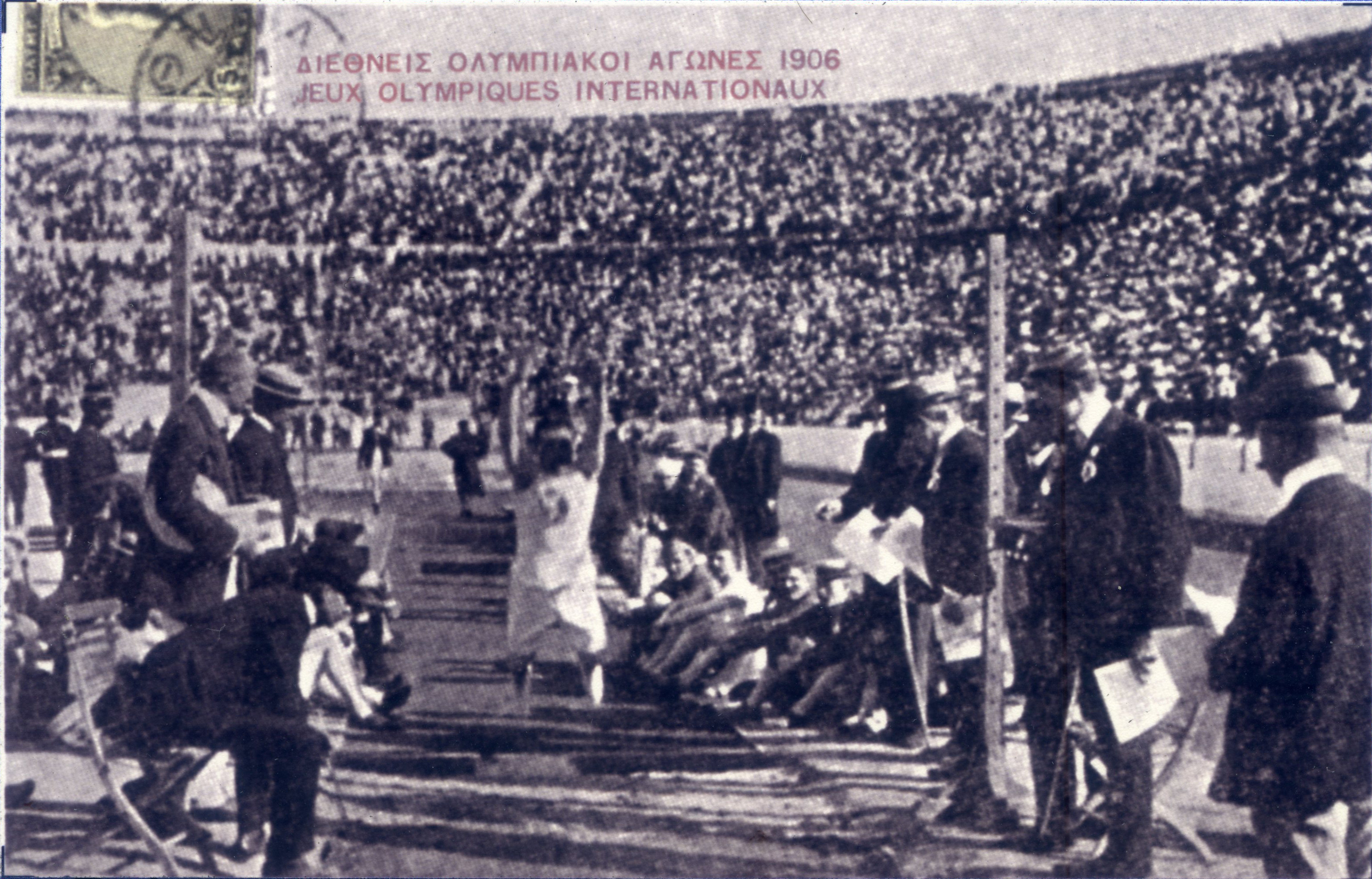
Long jump

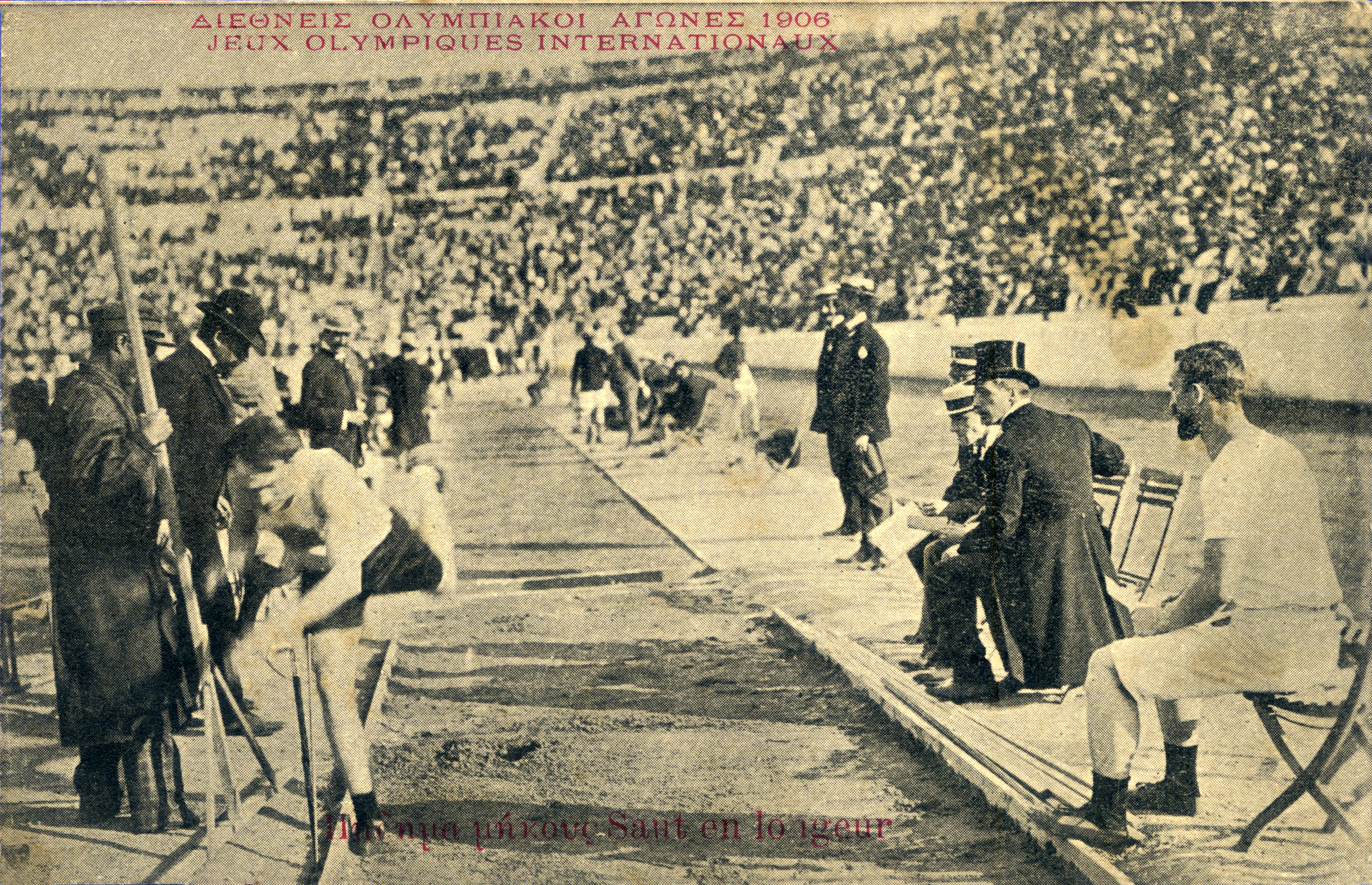
Long jump

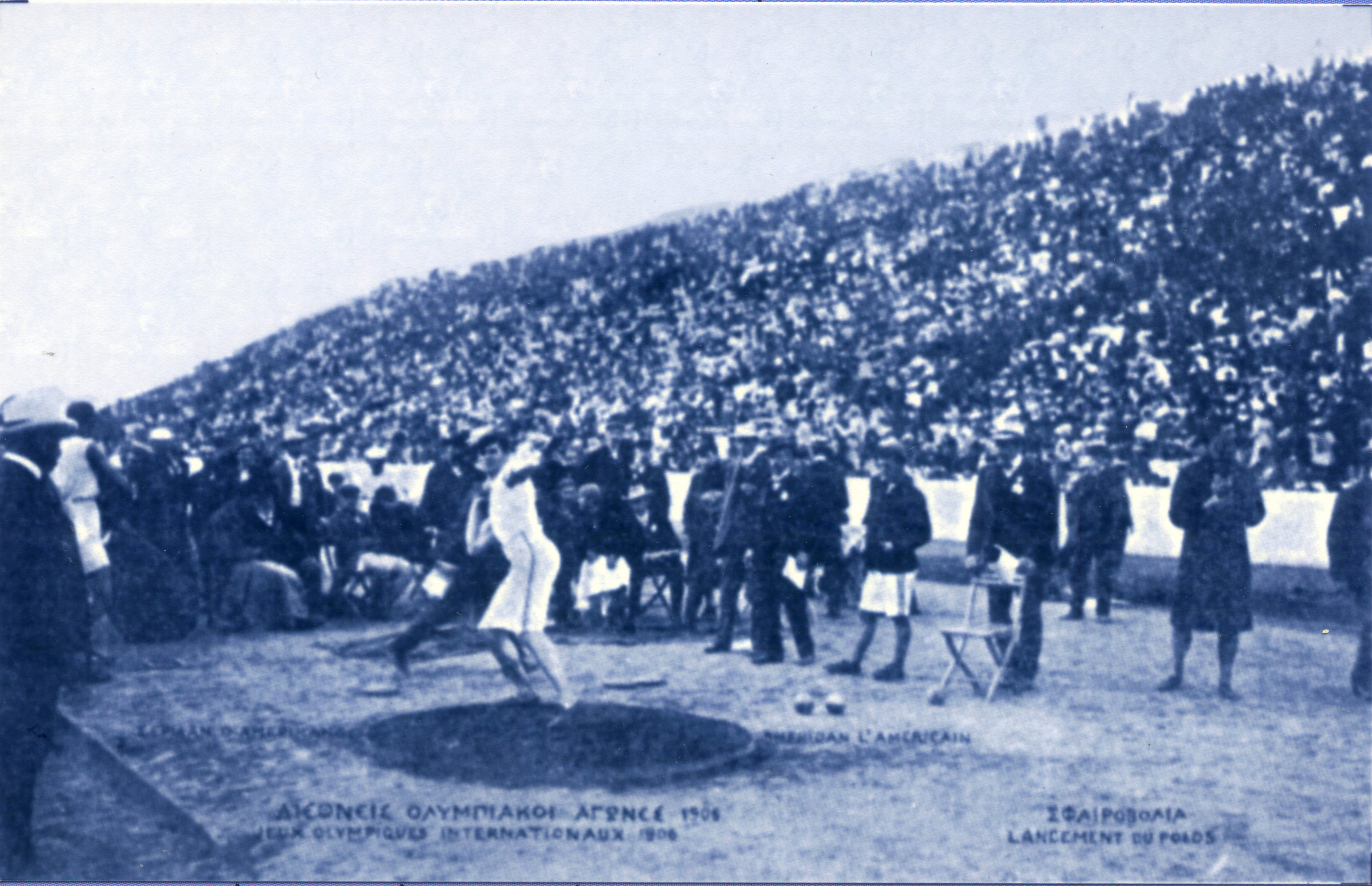
Shot Put. Sheridan winner

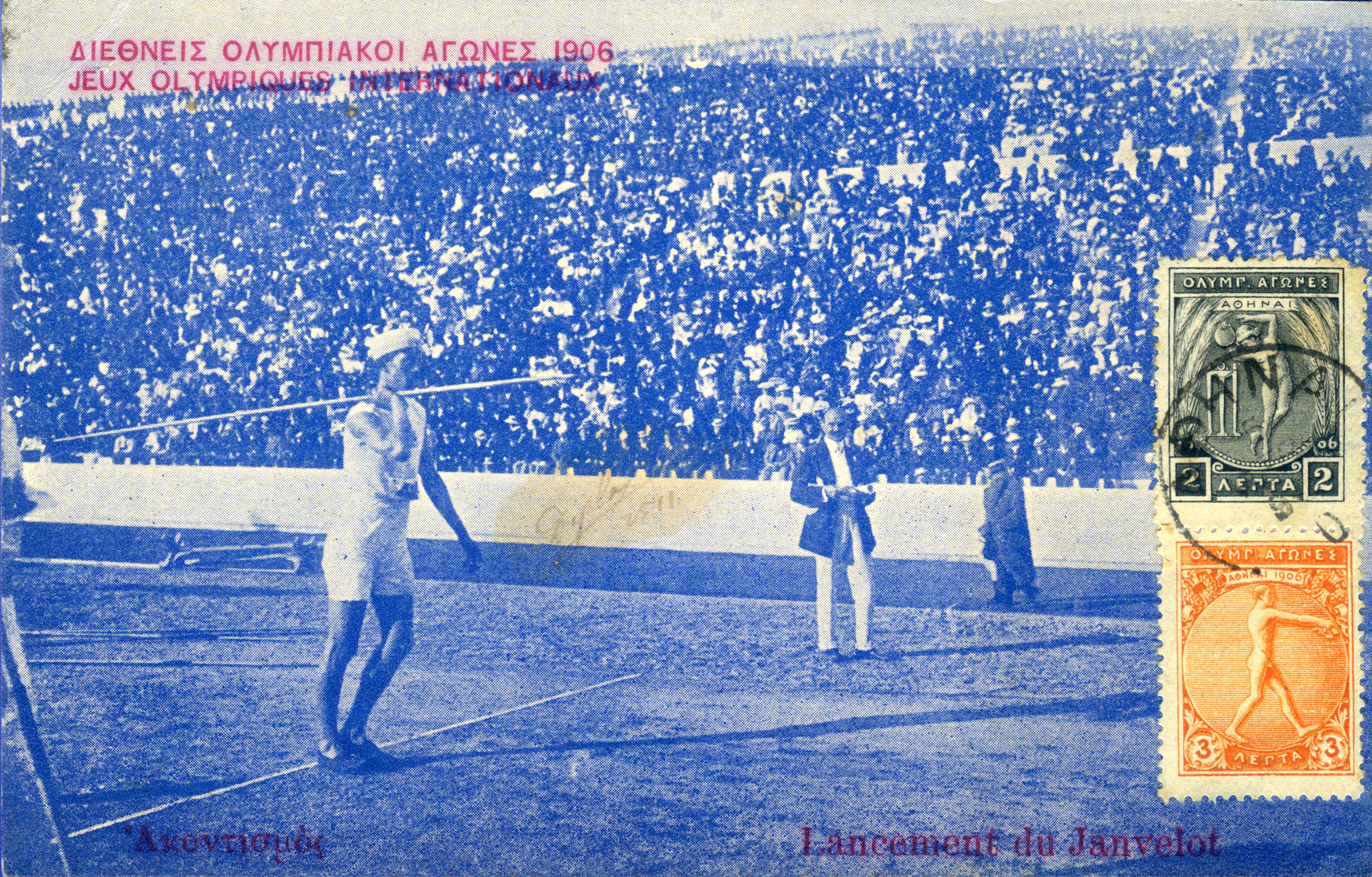
Javelin

== Medal table ==
Rank	Nation	Gold	Silver	Bronze	Total
1	United States	11	6	6	23
2	Great Britain	3	5	1	9
3	Sweden	2	4	5	11
4	Hungary	1	3	1	5
5	Greece	1	2	4	7
6	Canada	1	1	0	2
7	Finland	1	0	1	2
8	France	1	0	0	1
9	Germany	0	1	1	2
10	Belgium	0	1	0	1
11	Australia	0	0	2	2
Totals (11 entries)		21	23	21	65
