= Tennis at the 1906 Intercalated Games – Women's singles =

Women's singles tennis at the 1906 Intercalated Games
- Venue: Athens Lawn Tennis Club
- Date: 23–28 April
- Competitors: 5 from 1 nation

Medalists
1st place, gold medalist(s)		Esmée Simirioti	Greece
2nd place, silver medalist(s)		Sophia Marinou	Greece
3rd place, bronze medalist(s)		Euphrosine Paspati	Greece

The women's singles was one of four lawn tennis events on the Tennis at the 1906 Intercalated Games program.

The tournament was played on clay courts at the Athens Lawn Tennis Club, and five players, all Greek, competed (a French and two Greek players withdrew after the draw to concentrate on the mixed doubles).

22-year-old Esmée Simirioti won the gold medal by defeating Sophia Marinou in three sets.

This is one of two events that featured a specific match to determine the bronze medal winner, in which Euphrosine Paspati won the bronze medal.

== Draw ==
Key

- Q = Qualifier
- WC = Wild card
- LL = Lucky loser
- Alt = Alternate
- ITF = ITF entry
- PR = Protected ranking
- SR = Special ranking
- SE = Special exempt
- JE = Junior exempt
- JR = Junior Accelerator Programme entrant
- CO = College Accelerator Programme entrant
- NG = Next Gen Accelerator Program entrant
- w/o = Walkover
- r = Retired
- d = Defaulted

=== Draw ===
First Round
Euphrosine Paspati (GRE)	w/o
Domini Elliadis (GRE)
Sophia Marinou (GRE)	6	6
Ioanna Tissamenou (GRE)	1	0
Marie Decugis (FRA)
Aspasia Matsa (GRE)	w/o
V. Melis (GRE)
Esmée Simirioti (GRE)	w/o

Semifinals
Euphrosine Paspati (GRE)	0	6	3
Sophia Marinou (GRE)	6	4	6
Aspasia Matsa (GRE)	5	2
Esmée Simirioti (GRE)	7	6

Gold Medal Match
Sophia Marinou (GRE)	6	3	3
Esmée Simirioti (GRE)	2	6	6
Bronze Medal Match
Euphrosine Paspati (GRE)	6	6
Aspasia Matsa (GRE)	0	4
