= Bohemia at the 1906 Intercalated Games =

- IOC code: BOH
- NOC: Bohemian Committee for the Olympic Games

in Athens
- Competitors: 13 in 6 sports
- Medals Ranked 19th: Gold 0 Silver 0 Bronze 2 Total 2

Summer appearances
- 1900; 1904; 1908; 1912

Other related appearances
- Czechoslovakia (1920–1992); Czech Republic (1994–pres.)

Bohemia competed at the 1906 Intercalated Games in Athens, Greece. 13 athletes, all men, competed in 22 events in 6 sports.

== Medalists ==
Medal	Name	Sport	Event
Bronze	Zdenek Žemla	Tennis	Men's singles
Bronze	Zdenek Žemla; Ladislav Žemla	Tennis	Men's doubles

== Athletics ==
Track

Athlete	Events	Heat		Semifinals		Final	
Athlete	Events	Result	Rank	Result	Rank	Result	Rank
Bohuslav Pohl-Polenský	100 metres	Unknown	2 Q	Unknown	5	did not advance	
Otto Hahnel-Kohout	100 metres	Unknown	Unknown	did not advance			
Arnošt Nejedlý	5 mile	n/a				Unknown	Unknown
Arnošt Nejedlý	Marathon	n/a				3-40:00.2	15

Field

Athlete	Events	Final	
Athlete	Events	Result	Rank
Otto Hahnel-Kohout	Long Jump	5.575	20
Bohuslav Pohl-Polenský	Triple Jump	12.195	12
František Souček	Discus	Unknown	Unknown
Miroslav Šustera	Discus	Unknown	Unknown
František Souček	Discus (Greek style)	27.550	6
Miroslav Šustera	Discus (Greek style)	27.080	7
František Souček	Javelin	39.000	10
Miroslav Šustera	Pentathlon	38 points	12
František Souček	Pentathlon	41 points	14

== Fencing ==
Athlete	Events	Heat Group	Semifinal Group	Final Group
Athlete	Events	Rank	Rank	Rank
Vlastimil Lada-Sázavský	Individual Foil	Unknown	did not advance	

== Gymnastics ==
Athlete	Events	Final	
Athlete	Events	Result	Rank
Bohumil Honzátko	Individual All-Around	109	10
Bohumil Honzátko	Individual All-Around (5 events)	90	7
Bohumil Honzátko	Rope climbing	19.0	17

== Shooting ==
Athlete	Event	Target Hits	Points	Rank
Antonín Ehrenberger	Free pistol, 25 metres	28	174	26
Antonín Ehrenberger	Gras Model Revolver, 20 metres	13	55	29
Antonín Ehrenberger	Free Rifle any position, 300 metres	24	113	31
Antonín Ehrenberger	Rifle Gras Model Kneeling or Standing, 200 metres	26	161	10
Antonín Ehrenberger	Rifle Kneeling or Standing, 300 metres	24	104	41

== Tennis ==
Although Zdenek Žemla was beaten in the second round records show he won the bronze medal

Player	Event	Round One	Round Two	Quarterfinals	Semifinals	Finals	Rank
Player	Event	Opposition Score	Opposition Score	Opposition Score	Opposition Score	Opposition Score	Rank
Zdenek Žemla	Men's Singles	Bye	Maurice Germot (FRA); L 6–3, 1–6, 2–6	did not advance			3rd place, bronze medalist(s)
Jaroslav Žemla	Men's Singles	Károly Vitus (HUN); W	Leon Zarifis (GRE); Withdrew	did not advance			9
Ladislav Žemla	Men's Singles	Karel Beukema (NED); L 0–6, 4–6	did not advance				14
Zdenek Žemla; Ladislav Žemla	Men's Doubles	Bye	N/A	Homer Byington; Robert Schauffler (USA); W 6–3, 6–3	Max Decugis; Maurice Germot (FRA); L 3–6, 4–6	Did not advance	3rd place, bronze medalist(s)

== Wrestling ==
Greco-Roman

Athlete	Event	Round 1	Semifinals	Final Group		
Athlete	Event	Opposition Result	Opposition Result	Opposition Result	Opposition Result	Rank
Karel Halík	Lightweight	Erődi (HUN); W	Carlsen (DEN); L	did not advance		4
Václav Hradecký	Middleweight	Tsitas (GRE); W	Behrens (DEN); L	did not advance		5
