= Decugis =

Decugis is a French surname. Notable people with the surname include:

- Cécile Decugis (1930–2017), French film editor and director
- Henri Decugis (1874–1947), French economist and author
- Julie Halard-Decugis (born 1970), French tennis player
- Marie Decugis (1884–1969), French tennis player
- Max Decugis (1882–1978), French tennis player
