= Maspoli =

Maspoli or Máspoli is a surname. Notable people with the name include:

- Alexandre Maspoli, French sculptor and athletics competitor
- Flavio Maspoli (1950–2007), Swiss politician
- Roque Máspoli (1917-2004), Uruguayan footballer and coach
