= Georgios Simiriotis =

Greek tennis player

- Native name: Γεώργιος Σημηριώτης
- Country (sports): Greece
- Born: 1886
- Died: Unknown
Medal record
Tennis
1906 Intercalated Games
Representing Greece
Silver medal – second place	1906 Athens	Mixed doubles
Panhellenic Tennis Championship
Gold medal – first place	1906 Athens	Singles
Gold medal – first place	1906 Athens	Men's doubles
Gold medal – first place	1906 Athens	Mixed doubles
Gold medal – first place	1908 Athens	Singles
Gold medal – first place	1908 Athens	Men's doubles
Gold medal – first place	1908 Athens	Mixed doubles

Georgios Simiriotis (Greek: Γεώργιος Σημηριώτης, 1886 - unknown) was a Greek tennis player, who won a silver medal in the mixed doubles event at the 1906 Intercalated Games. He also won multiple Panhellenic Tennis Championship events in 1906 and 1908.

== Career ==
At the 1906 Intercalated Games, Simiriotis competed with Sofia Marinou in the mixed doubles tennis event. They lost to eventual winners Max and Marie Decugis, and were awarded a silver medal. (Note: No second and third place match took place, and it is unknown why Marinou and Simiriotis were awarded the silver medal over Xenophon Kasdaglis and Aspasia Matsa.) In the men's doubles event, Simiriotis and Nikolaos Zarifis finished fourth, after losing their semi final match to Ioannis Ballis and Xenophon Kasdaglis. In the men's singles event, he lost his quarter final match to Gerard Scheurleer. Simiriotis also took part in one of the fencing competitions at the Games.

Simiriotis won the singles event at the 1906 and 1908 Panhellenic Tennis Championships. He also won the men's doubles event at the 1906 Championships alongside Dimitrios Syriotis, and in 1908 alongside Ioannis Ketseas. He won the mixed doubles event at the 1906 Championships alongside Lena Paspati (Greek: Λένα Πασπάτη), and in 1908 alongside Sofia Marinou.

== Personal life ==
Simiriotis' mother descended from the family of Georgios Zariphis. His sister Esmée Simirioti also competed at the 1906 Intercalated Games in tennis, winning the Women's singles event. It is believed that Simiriotis was also related to Sofia Marinou.
