= Sofia Marinou =

Greek tennis player

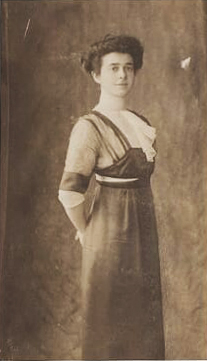
- Native name: Σοφία Μαρίνου
- Country (sports): Greece
- Born: 18 August 1882
- Died: 22 November 1974
Medal record
Tennis
1906 Intercalated Games
Representing Greece
Silver medal – second place	Tennis	Women's singles
Silver medal – second place	Tennis	Mixed doubles
Panhellenic Tennis Championship
Gold medal – first place	1908 Athens	Mixed doubles

Sofia Marinou (Greek: Σοφία Μαρίνου, 18 August 1882 - 22 November 1974) was a Greek tennis player, who won two silver medals at the 1906 Intercalated Games in Athens, Greece.

== Career ==
At the 1906 Intercalated Games in Athens, Greece, Marinou competed in the Women's singles competition, and the Mixed doubles competition, alongside Georgios Simiriotis. In her first round singles match against Ioanna Tissamenou, Marinou and Tissamenou became the first women to represent Greece at an Olympic Games. (Note: The 1906 Intercalated Games were recognised as an Olympic Games at the time, but were later classed as unofficial by the International Olympic Committee.) In the mixed doubles event, Marinou and Simiriotis lost to eventual winners Max and Marie Decugis, and they were awarded a silver medal. (Note: No second and third place match took place, and it is unknown why Marinou and Simiriotis were awarded the silver medal over Xenophon Kasdaglis and Aspasia Matsa.)

Marinou and Simiriotis later won the mixed doubles event at the 1908 Panhellenic Tennis Championship.

== Personal life ==
It is believed that Sofia Marinou was related to Georgios Simiriotis and his sister Esmée Simirioti.

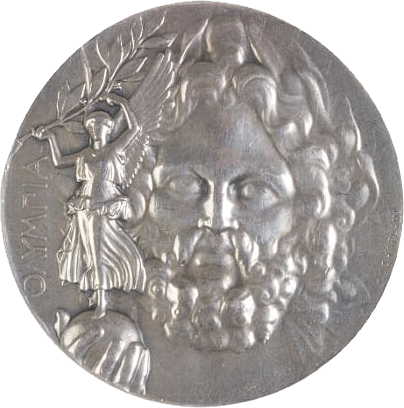
Medal (front) awarded to Marinou
