= Greece at the 1906 Intercalated Games =

Greece at the Olympics

- IOC code: GRE
- NOC: Hellenic Olympic Committee

in Athens
- Competitors: 312 in 13 sports
- Medals Ranked 3rd: Gold 8 Silver 13 Bronze 13 Total 34

Summer appearances
- 1896; 1900; 1904; 1908; 1912; 1920; 1924; 1928; 1932; 1936; 1948; 1952; 1956; 1960; 1964; 1968; 1972; 1976; 1980; 1984; 1988; 1992; 1996; 2000; 2004; 2008; 2012; 2016; 2020; 2024; 2028

Winter appearances
- 1936; 1948; 1952; 1956; 1960; 1964; 1968; 1972; 1976; 1980; 1984; 1988; 1992; 1994; 1998; 2002; 2006; 2010; 2014; 2018; 2022; 2026

Greece were the host nation at the 1906 Intercalated Games in Athens, Greece. 312 athletes, 307 men and 5 women, competed in 70 events in 13 sports.

== Medalists ==
Medal	Name	Sport	Event
Gold	Dimitrios Tofalos	Weightlifting	Men's two hand lift
Gold	Nikolaos Georgantas	Athletics	Stone throw (6.4 kg)
Gold	Ioannis Georgiadis	Fencing	Men's sabre
Gold	Georgios Aliprantis	Gymnastics	Rope climbing
Gold	"Team Poros": Isidoros Mikas; Ioannis Georgas; Michail Sokos; Ioannis Agrimis; Argos Milonas; Dimitrios Kakousis; Ioannis Loukas; Pavlos Karangonidis; Ioannis Lafiotis; Michail Mouratis; Christos Tsirigotakis; Andreas Drivas; Konstantinos Kefalas; Ioannis Kaisarefs; Ioannis Pilouris; Dimitrios Piaditis; Petros Velliotis	Rowing	Naval boats (16 men)
Gold	Georgios Orphanidis	Shooting	50 m pistol
Gold	Konstantinos Skarlatos	Shooting	30 m duelling pistol
Gold	Esmée Simirioti	Tennis	Women's singles
Silver	Nikolaos Georgantas	Athletics	Men's Discus throw
Silver	Nikolaos Georgantas	Athletics	Men's Discus throw, Greek style
Silver	Ioannis Raisis	Fencing	Sabre masters
Silver	Ioannis Georgiadis; Triantafyllos Kordogiannis; Menelaos Sakorafos; Chatran Zorbas	Fencing	Team sabre
Silver	"Team ironclad Hydra": Ioannis Tsirakis; Michail Katsoulis; Konstantinos Niotis; Nikolaos Stergiou; Ioannis Papapanagiotou; Ioannis Dolas; Petros Pterneas; Georgios Nikoloutsos; Ioannis Grypaios; Stamatios Diomataras; Evangelos Kanakaris; Ioannis Fasilis; Konstantinos Papagiannoulis; S. Lemonis; Evangelos Kanakaris; Xenofon Stellas; Evangelos Chaldeos; Ioannis Milakas	Rowing	Naval boats (16 men)
Silver	"Team ironclad Spetses": Dimitrios Dais; Pavlos Kypraios; Dimitrios Balourdos; Nikolaos Dekavalas; Nikolaos Karsouvas; Spyros Vessalas; Konstantinos Misonginis	Rowing	Naval boats (6 men)
Silver	Alexandros Theofilakis	Shooting	25 m army pistol (standard model)
Silver	Anastasios Metaxas	Shooting	Trap, double shot
Silver	Ioannis Peridis	Shooting	Trap, single shot
Silver	Spyridon Lazaros; Konstantinos Lazaros; Antonios Tsitas; Spyridon Vellas; Vassilios Psachos; Georgios Psachos; Georgios Papachristou; Panagiotis Triboulidas	Tug of war	Tug of war
Silver	Sofia Marinou	Tennis	Women's singles
Silver	Sofia Marinou; Georgios Simiriotis	Tennis	Mixed doubles
Silver	Ioannis Ballis; Xenophon Kasdaglis	Tennis	Men's doubles
Bronze	Themistoklis Diakidis	Athletics	High jump
Bronze	Michalis Dorizas	Athletics	Stone throw (6.4 kg)
Bronze	Konstantinos Spetsiotis	Athletics	1500 metre walk
Bronze	Georgios Saridakis	Athletics	3000 metre walk
Bronze	Ioannis Raisis	Fencing	Épée masters
Bronze	"Omilos Filomouson Thessaloniki"* : Georgios Vaporis; Nikolaos Pindos; Antonios Tegos; Nikolaos Pentzikis; Ioannis Kyrou; Georgios Sotiriadis; Vasilios Zarkadis; Dimitrios Michitsopoulos; Antonios Karagionidis; Ioannis Abbot; Ioannis Saridakis	Football	Football
Bronze	Konstantinos Kozanitas	Gymnastics	Rope climbing
Bronze	"Team ironclad Hydra": Dionysios Christeas; Dimitrios Grous; Georgios Maroulis; Nikolaos Fotinakis; P. Lomvardos; Dimitrios Souranis; Petros Mexis	Rowing	Naval boats (6 men)
Bronze	Aristides Rangavis	Shooting	25 m rapid fire pistol
Bronze	Aristides Rangavis	Shooting	50 m pistol
Bronze	Georgios Skotadis	Shooting	25 m army pistol (standard model)
Bronze	Euphrosine Paspati	Tennis	Women's singles
Bronze	Xenophon Kasdaglis; Aspasia Matsa	Tennis	Mixed doubles

- The bronze medal won by the team of Omilos Filomouson Thessaloniki (predecessor of Iraklis) is registered to Greece. The team was composed by ethnic Greeks, despite the fact that the city was part of the Ottoman Empire at the time.
- A rowing silver medal in the coxed pairs event over 1 mile is classed as a mixed team medal. The Belgian brothers Max and Rémy Orban arrived in Greece without a coxswain, as they didn't know they required one, so they recruited the Greek Theophilos Psiliakos.
