= Maurits van Löben Sels =

Dutch fencer (1876–1944)

Personal information
- Full name: Maurits Jacob van Löben Sels
- Nationality: Dutch
- Born: 1 May 1876 Meppen, Netherlands
- Died: 4 October 1944 (aged 68) Velp, Netherlands

Sport
- Sport: Fencing
Medal record
Men's fencing
Representing Netherlands
Intercalated Games
Bronze medal – third place	1906 Athens	Sabre, Team

Maurits van Löben Sels (1 May 1876 – 4 October 1944) was a Dutch épée, foil and sabre fencer. He won a bronze medal in the team sabre event at the 1906 Intercalated Games.
