= Thomas Cronan =

American triple jumper

Medal record

Men's athletics

Representing United States

Intercalated Games
Bronze medal – third place	1906 Athens	Triple jump

Thomas Francis Cronan (April 24, 1885 – December 16, 1962) was an American athlete who competed mainly in the triple jump.

He competed for the United States in the 1906 Intercalated Games held in Athens, Greece in the triple jump where he won the bronze medal.
