= Themistoklis Diakidis =

Greek high jumper

Medal record

Men's athletics

Representing Greece

Intercalated Games
Bronze medal – third place	1906 Athens	High jump

Themistoklis Diakidis (Greek: Θεμιστοκλής Διακίδης; August 22, 1882 – May 8, 1944) was a Greek track and field athlete who competed in the high jump.

Diakidis was a member of Gymnastiki Etaireia Patron, that merged in 1923 with Panachaikos Gymnastikos syllogos to become Panachaiki Gymnastiki Enosi.

He competed for Greece in the 1906 Intercalated Games held in Athens, Greece, where he won the bronze medal jointly with the American Bert Kerrigan.
