= Maurice Faure (sport shooter) =

French sports shooter

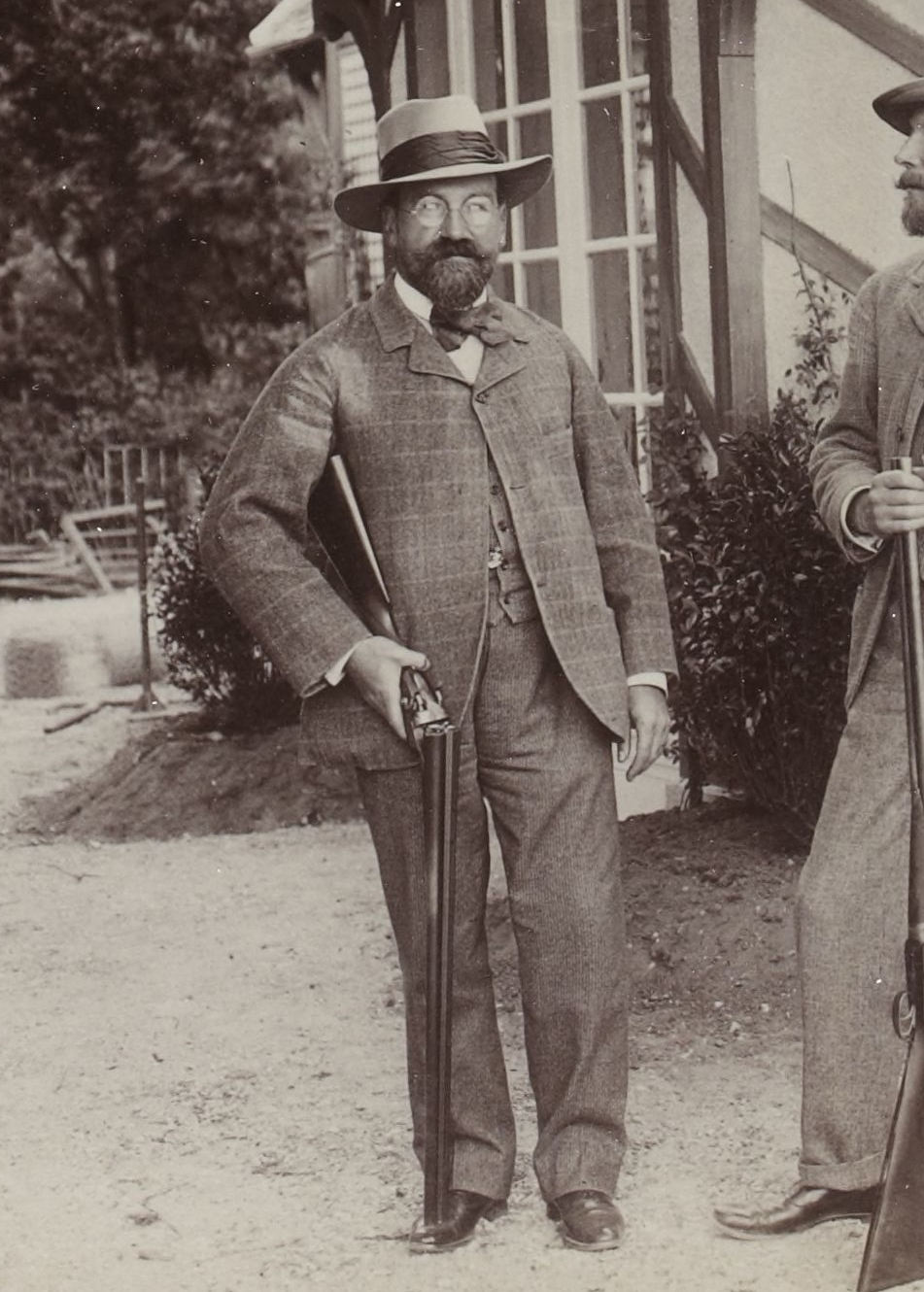

Personal information
- Born: 26 June 1859 Chaville, Second French Empire
- Died: 1945 (aged 85–86)
- Height: 168 cm (5 ft 6 in)

Sport
- Sport: Sports shooting
Medal record
Men's shooting
Representing France
Olympic Games
Bronze medal – third place	1906 Athens	Rifle, three positions

Maurice Faure (26 June 1859 – 1945) was a French sports shooter. He competed at the 1906 Intercalated Games and the 1912 Summer Olympics. He won a bronze medal at the 1906 Intercalated Games. He was also awarded a retrospective silver medal in live pigeon shooting at the 1900 Summer Olympics, although the Olympic status of the event is disputed.
