= Edward Glover (athlete) =

American pole vaulter

Medal record

Men's athletics

Representing the United States

Intercalated Games
Bronze medal – third place	1906 Athens	Pole Vault

Edward Chester Glover (March 1, 1885 – October 31, 1940) was an American athlete who competed mainly in the pole vault.

He competed for the United States in the 1906 Intercalated Games held in Athens, Greece in the Pole Vault where he won the bronze medal.
