= Konstantinos Spetsiotis =

Greek track and field athlete

Medal record

Men's athletics

Representing Greece

Intercalated Games
Bronze medal – third place	1906 Athens	1500 metre walk

Konstantinos Spetsiotis (Greek: Κωνσταντίνος Σπετσιώτης; 1883 – March 5, 1966) was a Greek track and field athlete who competed mainly in the 1500 metre walk.

He competed for Greece in the 1906 Intercalated Games held in Athens, Greece in the 1500 metre walk where he won the bronze medal.
