= William Frank (athlete) =

American long-distance runner

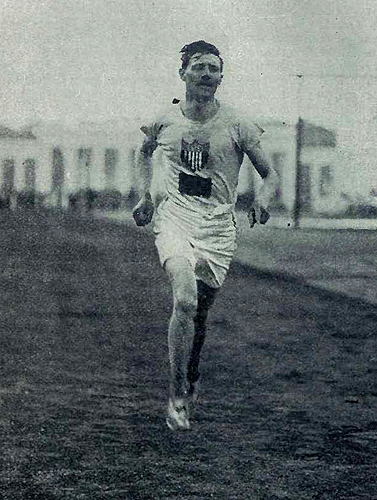
- Frank at the finish of the 1906 Olympic Marathon

Medal record

Men's athletics

Representing United States

Intercalated Games
Bronze medal – third place	1906 Athens	Marathon

William Gottlieb Frank (December 1, 1878 – March 31, 1965) was an American track and field athlete who was born in Besigheim, Ludwigsburg, Baden-Württemberg, Germany. He arrived in the United States in 1889. Frank was a member of the Irish American Athletic Club and the Twenty-Second Regiment of the New York National Guard. Frank was also a police officer assigned to the New York City Police Department's 74th Precinct.

Competing as a member of the New York National Guard, Twenty-second Regiment, Frank won the 3-mile race for the championship of the Military Athletic League in 1905. He also won the national indoor 10-mile championship at Madison Square Garden in 1906.

He competed for the United States in the 1906 Intercalated Games held in Athens, Greece in the 5 mile race and the Marathon, where he came in third place, winning the bronze medal.

About 1902 he married Adelaide Wingrove, a native of Astoria, and they had one child, a daughter Adelaide Johanna, in 1903.
