= Herbert Kerrigan =

American high jumper (1879–1959)

Medal record

Men's athletics

Representing United States

Intercalated Games
Bronze medal – third place	1906 Athens	High jump

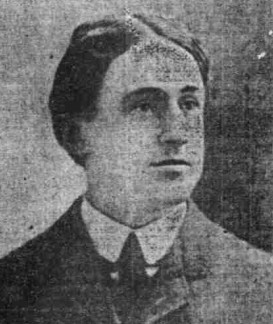
Kerrigan, circa 1904

Herbert William Kerrigan (January 24, 1879 – September 10, 1959) was an American track and field athlete who competed mainly in the high jump.

== Biography ==
He was born in Portland, Oregon and died in San Francisco.

Kerrigan competed for the Multnomah Athletic Club in Portland and won the Pacific Northwest high jump championships in 1894 and 1896. In the 1906 Intercalated Games held in Athens, Greece, Kerrigan won the bronze medal jointly with Greek athlete Themistoklis Diakidis. Kerrigan had been favored to win, but was injured by a wave that hit the ship carrying the U.S. team to Athens. The winning height of 5 ft 10 in (1.78 m) was the lowest winning height in Olympic history.
