= Georgios Saridakis =

Greek racewalker

Medal record

Men's athletics

Representing Greece

Intercalated Games
Bronze medal – third place	1906 Athens	3000 metre walk

Georgios Saridakis (Greek: Γεώργιος Σαριδάκης, born 1885, date of death unknown) was a Greek athlete who competed mainly in the 3000 metre walk.

He competed for a Greece in the 1906 Intercalated Games held in Athens, Greece in the 3000 metre walk where he won the bronze medal.
