= Karel Beukema =

Dutch footballer and tennis player (1878–1908)

Personal information
- Full name: Karel Willem Adriaan Beukema toe Water
- Date of birth: 4 January 1878
- Place of birth: Tokyo, Japan
- Date of death: 8 January 1908 (aged 30)
- Place of death: Beyoğlu, Netherlands
- Position: Forward

Senior career*
Years	Team	Apps	(Gls)
1899-1909	HVV		
Tennis career
Country (sports)	Netherlands
Singles
Other tournaments
Olympic Games	QF (1906)
Doubles
Other doubles tournaments
Olympic Games	QF (1906)
- * Club domestic league appearances and goals

Karel Willem Adriaan Beukema toe Water (4 January 1878 – 8 January 1908) was a Dutch diplomat, footballer who played as a forward for HVV, and a tennis player who won the Dutch singles championships in 1899, 1900, and 1902, winning the 1899 doubles with his brother, Frits.

== Sporting career ==
Born in Tokyo on 4 January 1878, Beukema began playing tennis for the Leimonias Club from The Hague, winning the first official Dutch Tennis Championship in 1899, which he followed with two more in 1900 and 1902, all in singles, as well as a doubles title in 1899, together with his brother Frits. In 1903, he faced Wimbledon champion Laurence Doherty in the final of an international tournament in Monte Carlo, narrowly losing (6–4, 6–4). Three years later, in 1906, he participated in the tennis events of the 1906 Intercalated Games, reaching the quarter finals in both singles and doubles, partnering up with fellow countryman Gerard Scheurleer, with whom he founded the Dutch interclub tennis competition. He was noted for his physical strength and attacking play, two uncommon qualities at the time.

Beukema also played cricket with HCC, and football with HVV, featuring as a right winger. In the 1898–99 season, the Beukema brothers helped HVV reach the final of the 1898–99 KNVB Cup, which ended in a 1–0 loss to RAP after extra-time. The following year, they were members of the HVV team that participated in the first edition of the Coupe Van der Straeten Ponthoz in 1900, regarded by many as the first-ever European club trophy, helping their side reach another final, which ended in another loss to RAP.

== Diplomatic career ==
After graduating in law at Utrecht University, Beukema entered diplomatic service and moved to Turkey, becoming acting consul in Constantinople in 1906. where he died on 8 January 1908, at the age of only 30, having developed typhoid fever a few weeks earlier.

== Honours ==
=== Tennis ===
- Dutch Tennis Championship (singles)
  - Champions (3): 1899, 1900, and 1902
- Dutch Tennis Championship (doubles)
  - Champions (1): 1899

=== Football ===
HVV

- Dutch championship:
  - Champions (3): 1899–1900, 1900–01, 1901–02
- KNVB Cup:
  - Runner-up (1): 1898–99
- Coupe Van der Straeten Ponthoz:
  - Runner-up (1): 1900
