= Robert Haven Schauffler =

American poet

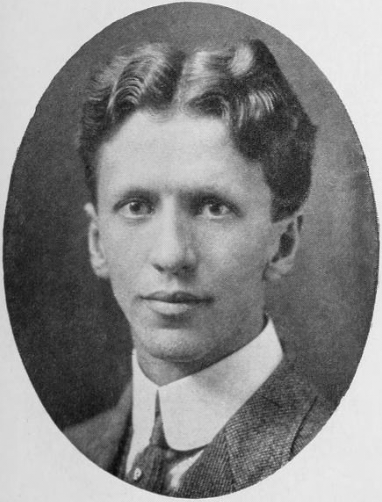
- Born: April 8, 1879; Brno, Austria-Hungary
- Died: November 24, 1964 (aged 85); New York City, New York, US

Robert Haven Schauffler (April 8, 1879 – November 24, 1964) was an American writer, cellist, athlete, and war hero. Schauffler published poetry, biographies of Beethoven, Brahms, and Schumann and a series of books celebrating American holidays.

== Early life, family and education ==
Schauffler was born on April 8, 1879 in Brno, where his parents were missionaries. By age two, he was in the US. In 1886, his family founded the Schauffler College of Religious and Social Work in Cleveland, Ohio, for Bohemian immigrants who were interested in social or religious work.

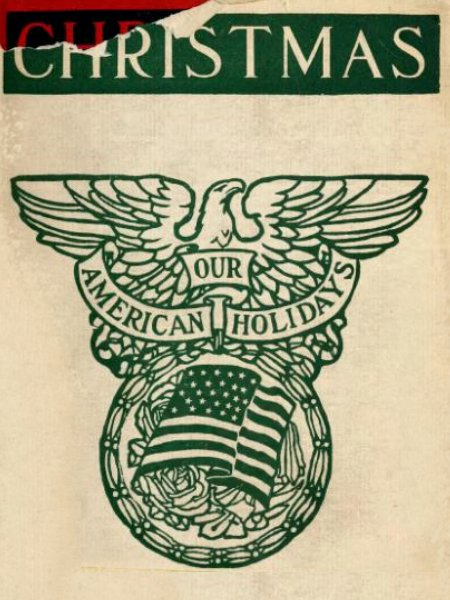
One of the first of his Holiday books

Schauffler was an avid tennis player. He studied cello with several notable musicians. His academic studies started at the Northwestern University, but he completed his degree at Princeton University before going on to study at University in Berlin in 1902–1903. By this time he had already been editor of the Nassau Literary Magazine for a year.

== Career ==
Schauffler's first successful career was as a cellist. On his return from Berlin, he combined his skills as a music editor for another magazine. He represented the US in men's singles and doubles tennis at the 1906 Intercalated Games in Athens.

In 1907 he published the first of several books that celebrated American holidays. The first were Thanksgiving and Our American Holidays - Christmas. The book he created for Christmas includes several extracts from Dickens, Shakespeare, Leigh Hunt and William Morris. The first section deals with whether there is or is not a Santa Claus by quoting the 1897 editorial by Francis Pharcellus Church. The book is certain that there is.

He came to notice in 1912 when he published a book of poetry named after the poem "Scum o' the Earth". This poem had come to notice after being published in a magazine. The poem had focussed attention on the monetary divide between middle class American and poor immigrants. Schauffler published Arbor Day two years later and there then followed books for Washington's Birthday, Lincoln's Birthday and Independence Day. His final holiday books were not published until after the war and there were Armistice Day in 1927, Plays for Our American Holidays in 1928, Halloween in 1933, and Columbus Day, five years later. His books before World War I involved several on travel. He wrote Through Italy with the Poets in 1908, Romantic Germany the following year and in 1913 he published Romantic America.

Schauffler joined the Army as a second lieutenant and served as an instructor. He was awarded a Purple Heart for his wounds at the Battle of Montfaucon which occurred in mid-October 1918. He took up employment as a lecturer when he left the US Army in May 1919 and continued writing poetry in his spare time. He lectured for the next few decades and also wrote biographies of music composers Franz Schubert, Robert Schumann, Johannes Brahms and Ludwig van Beethoven.

In 1942 he again took up the holiday theme when he published the first of three more holiday titles working with Hilah Paulmier. The first was called Democracy Days.... A year later they published Pan American Day and in 1946 and 1947 they published Peace Days and Good will days'. Schauffler died in 1964 as a divorcee and his papers are stored at the University of Texas at Austin.

== Personal life ==
Schauffler married before the First World War but his wife, Katharine de Normandie Wilson, died in 1916 and he was a widower for several years. He moved to the Greenbush section of Scituate, Massachusetts, about 1911. He owned property in Scituate from about 1912 to 1919. This was an estate named Arden and included a log cabin studio.

He remarried to Margaret Widdemer who jointly won the Pulitzer Award for Poetry that year in 1919 for her collection The Old Road to Paradise.

== Partial list of works ==
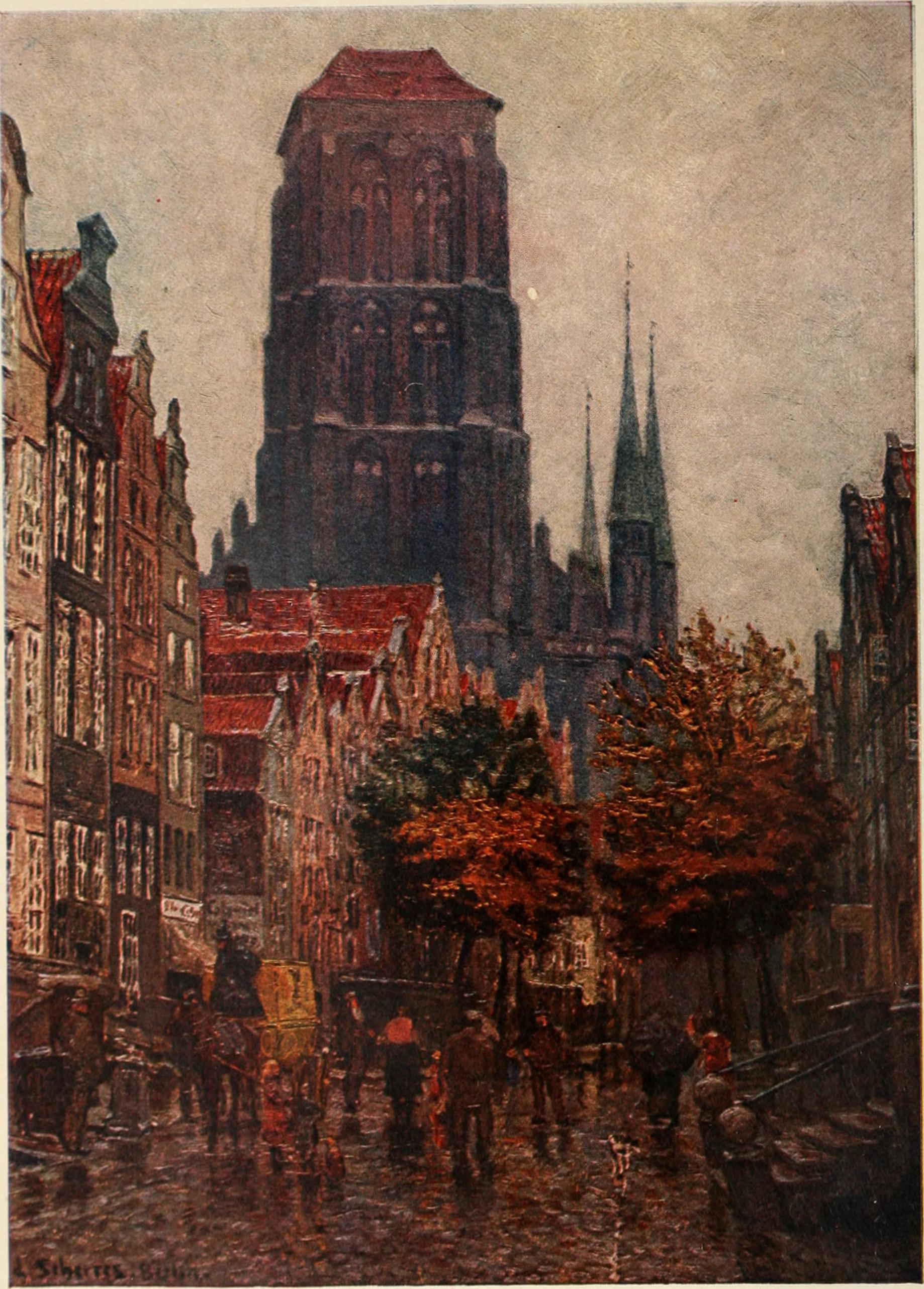
Romantic Germany (1910)

=== Poetry ===
- Scum o' the Earth and Other Poems, 1912
- The White Comrade and Other Poems, 1920
- Magic Flame and Other Poems, 1923
- The poetry cure, a pocket medicine chest of verse, 1925
- The poetry cure, with Marion Bauer (1927)
- The junior poetry cure (1931)
- New and Selected Poems, 1942

=== Holiday books ===
- Thanksgiving
- Our American Holidays - Christmas
- Arbor Day
- Washington's Birthday (1926)
- Lincoln's Birthday (1909)
- Independence Day (1912)
- Armistice Day
- Plays for Our American Holidays
- Halloween
- Columbus Day
- Christmas (1907)

=== Prose ===
- The Joyful Heart (1914)
- Franz Schubert: The Ariel of Music (before 1923)
- Peter Pantheism (1925)
- Beethoven: the man who freed music. Vol. 1–2 (1929)
- Hobnails in Eden. Poems of a Maine vagabond (1929)
- A manthology; songs that are fit for men, and a few women (1931)
- The mad musician; an abridgment of Beethoven: the man who freed music (1932)
- The unknown Brahms (1933)
- The magic of music, an anthology for music (1935)
- Florestan, the life and work of Robert Schumann (1945)
