= Esmée Simirioti =

Greek tennis player

- Native name: Εσμέ Σημηριώτου
- Country (sports): Greece
- Born: 1884
- Died: 10 October 1982 (aged 97–98)
Medal record
Tennis
1906 Intercalated Games
Representing Greece
Gold medal – first place	Tennis	Women's singles
Panhellenic Tennis Championship
Gold medal – first place	1910 Athens	Women's singles
Gold medal – first place	1912 Athens	Women's singles
Gold medal – first place	1914 Athens	Mixed doubles
Gold medal – first place	1924 Athens	Women's doubles
Silver medal – second place	1924 Athens	Women's singles
- Last updated on: 27 October 2018.

Esmée Simirioti (Greek: Εσμέ Σημηριώτου; 1884 – 10 October 1982) was a Greek tennis player, who won the women's singles event at the 1906 Intercalated Games in Athens, Greece. Her name is sometimes translated as Esme Simiriotis.

== Career ==
Simirioti competed for Greece in the tennis events at the 1906 Intercalated Games in Athens, Greece. Simirioti won the Women's singles event, beating fellow Greek Sofia Marinou in the final. She was the seventh youngest gold medallist at the games, at the age of 22 years and 116 days. Simirioti also competed in the mixed doubles event with Nikolaos Zarifis, losing in the semi-finals.

Simirioti later won the Panhellenic Tennis Championship singles event in 1910 and 1914, and came second in 1924. She also won the mixed doubles event in 1914, and the women's double event in 1924.

== Personal life ==
Simirioti's mother descended from the family of Georgios Zariphis. Her brother Georgios Simiriotis also competed at the 1906 Intercalated Games in tennis. She died on 10 October 1982.
