= Alexandre Maspoli =

French sculptor and athletics competitor

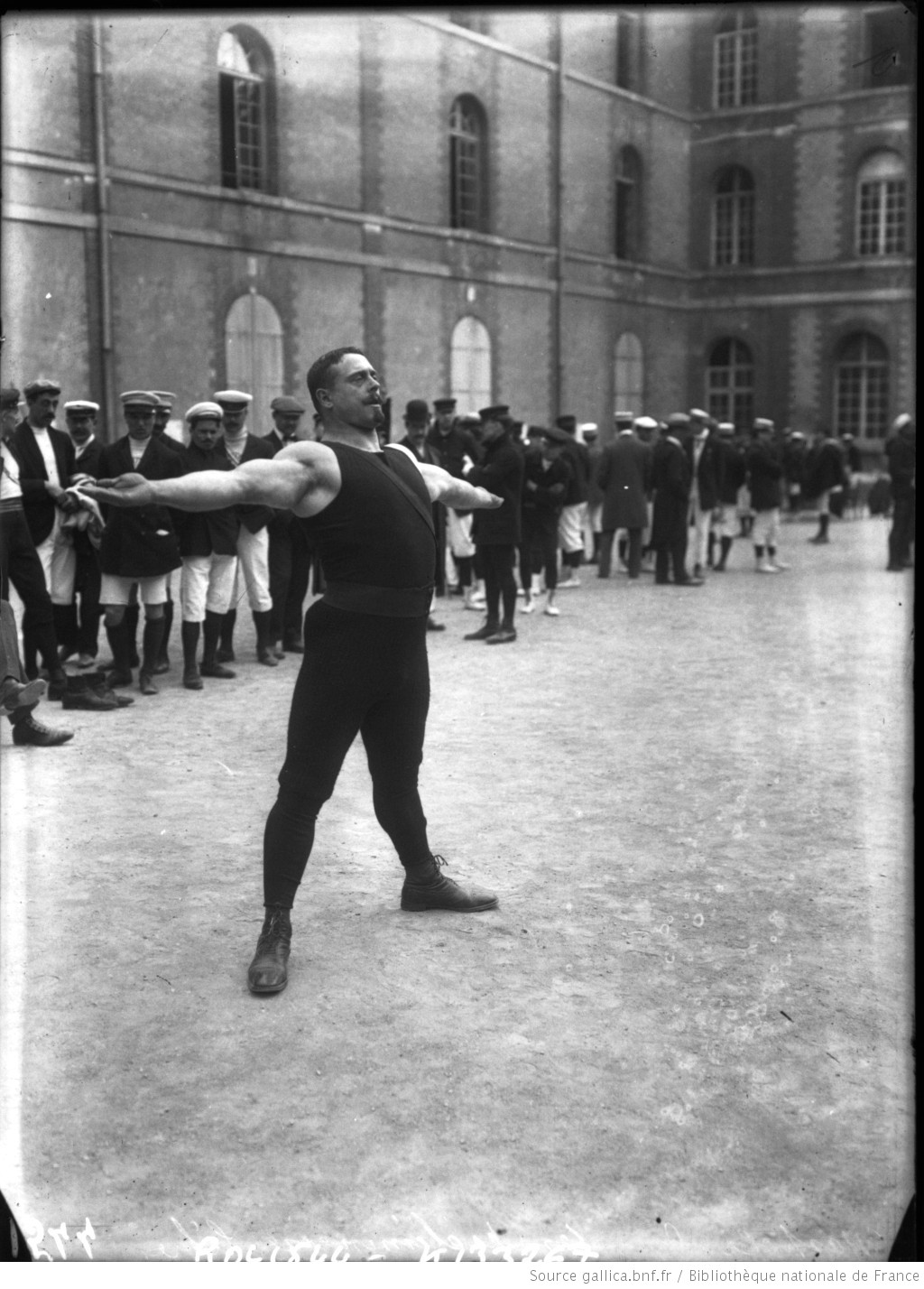
- Maspoli in 1908

Personal information
- Born: 29 September 1875 Lyon, France
- Died: 25 September 1943 (aged 67)
- Height: 170 cm (5 ft 7 in)
- Weight: 91 kg (201 lb)

Sport
- Country: France
- Sport: Weightlifting; Standing long jump; Sculpture

Achievements and titles
- Olympic finals: 1906, 1924
- World finals: 1902
- National finals: 1905, 1907
Medal record
Weightlifting
Representing FRA
World Weightlifting Championships
| Gold medal – first place | 1902 London | Combined |
Intercalated Games
| Bronze medal – third place | 1906 Athens | Two hand lift |

Alexandre Maspoli (29 September 1875 – 25 September 1943) was a French sculptor and weightlifter. He came joint third in the two-hand lift event at the 1906 Intercalated Games in Athens, and was amateur weightlifting champion 19 years in a row. After the First World War, Maspoli designed war memorials, as well as sculptures to commemorate Félix Desvernay, Frantz Reichel, and Julien Barbero.

== Career ==
=== Sports career ===
Maspoli was born in Lyon, France. He was an amateur weightlifting champion 19 years in a row. Maspoli won the combined events at the unofficial 1902 Weightlifting World Championships, setting a new world record in the process. In 1905, Maspoli won the French National Championships. In the throwing event, he threw 130 kilograms (290 lb). At the 1906 Intercalated Games in Athens, Maspoli came joint third in the two-hand lift event. Maspoli, Heinrich Schneidereit and Heinrich Rondl all lifted 129.5 kilograms (285 lb). He also participated in the one hand lift event, where he finished fourth, and the standing long jump event, where he finished 18th. In the same year, he featured in La Culture physique, as an example of "perfect masculine physicality". In 1907, Maspoli retained his French National Championship title.

=== Sculpture ===
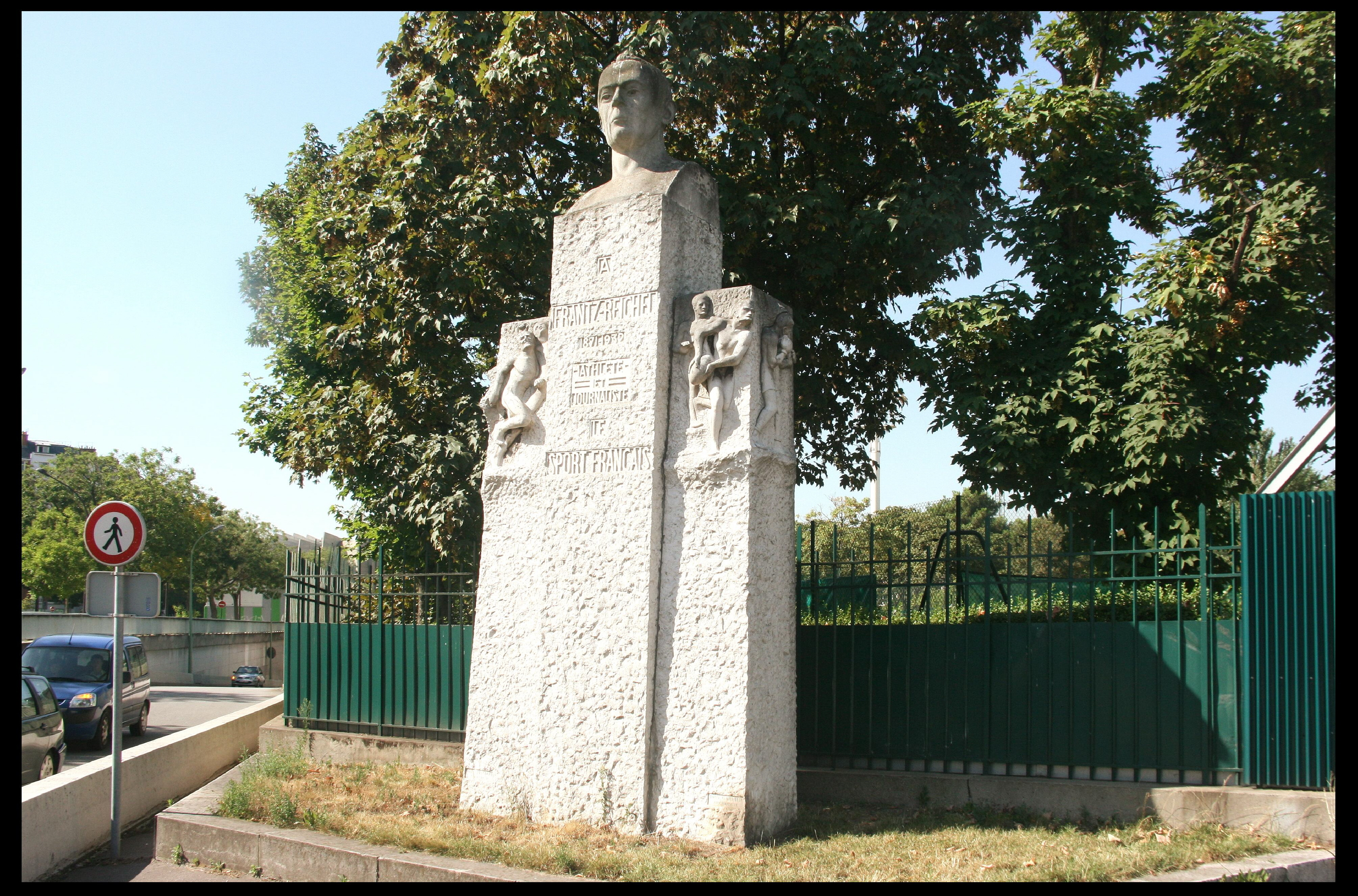
Monument to Frantz Reichel, sculpted by Maspoli.

After the First World War, Maspoli was commissioned to build war memorials in La Côte-Saint-André and Arcachon. The Arcachon memorial promoted pacifism and the loss of families in the war. He submitted two works, Jet du boulet and Mask of Philippides, for the mixed sculpture event at the 1924 Summer Olympics in Paris. He was not awarded a medal. In 1928, Maspoli created a bust memorial to historian Félix Desvernay. In 1933, Maspoli was commissioned to create a monument to sportsman and journalist Frantz Reichel in the 16th arrondissement of Paris. The sculpture was finished the following year. For this monument, he became the first winner of the Grand Prix de la Presse Sportive award in 1934. The award was created by the Syndicat National des Journalistes sportifs (National Union of Sports Journalists) for the best "sporting act" of the year. (Note: Sculpture was included in the definition of sport) In 1938, he built a statue to politician Julien Barbero in Lyon.
