= Tennis at the 1906 Intercalated Games =

At the 1906 Intercalated Games, four events in tennis were contested. Though now termed the Intercalated Games, the 1906 Games were at the time regarded as an official Olympics event. This status was retroactively revoked by the International Olympic Committee. The events were played on outdoor clay courts at the Athens Lawn Tennis Club and were held from 23 April until the 28 April 1906.

== Medal summary ==
=== Events ===
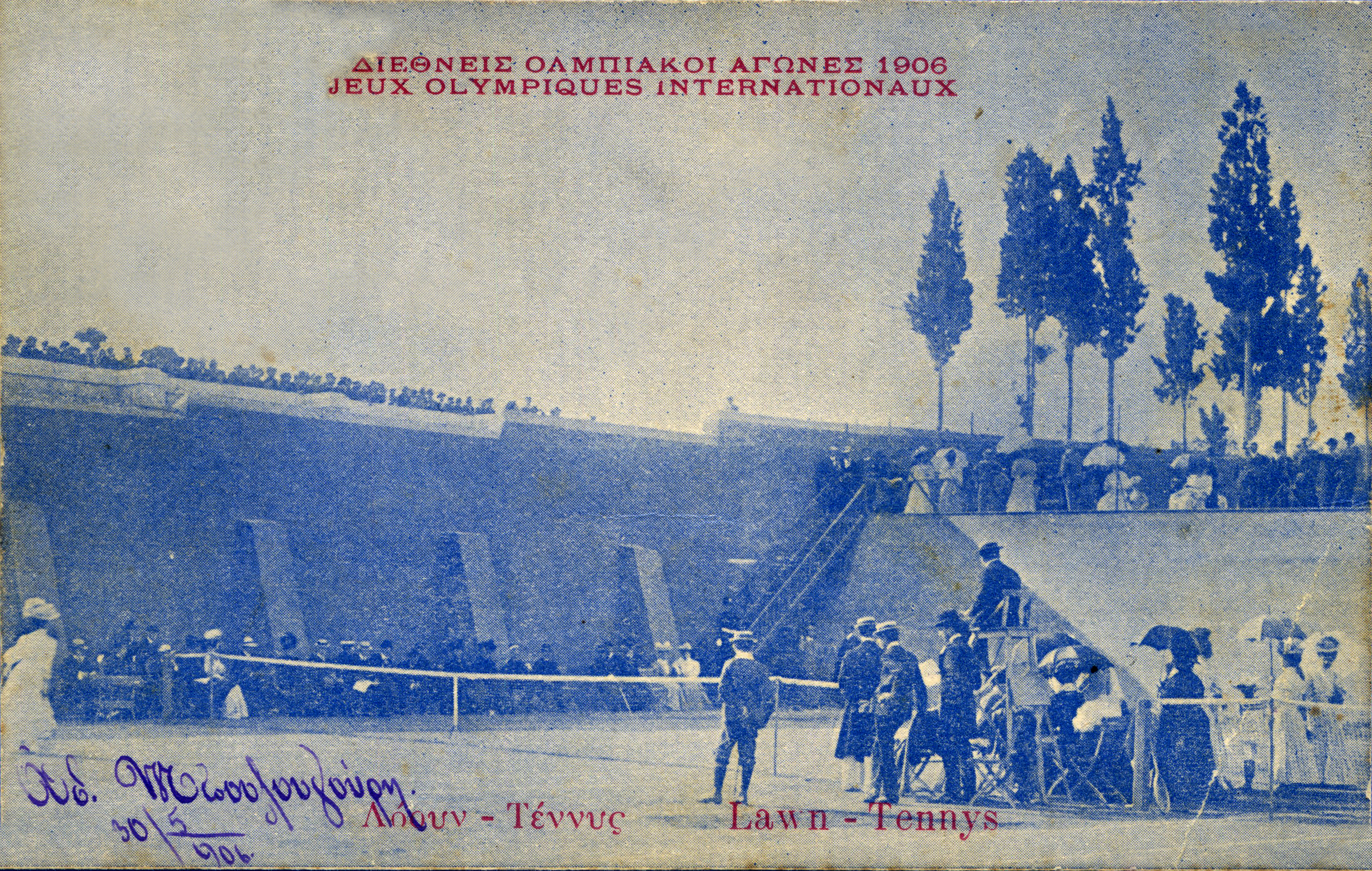
Women's single match during the Games. Post card of 1906, published by Aspiotis.

Event	Gold	Silver	Bronze
Men's singles	Max Decugis; France	Maurice Germot; France	Zdeněk Žemla; Bohemia
Men's doubles	France; Max Decugis; Maurice Germot	Greece; Ioannis Ballis; Xenophon Kasdaglis	Bohemia; Ladislav Žemla; Zdeněk Žemla
Women's singles	Esmée Simirioti; Greece	Sophia Marinou; Greece	Euphrosine Paspati; Greece
Mixed doubles	France; Marie Decugis; Max Decugis	Greece; Sophia Marinou; Georgios Simiriotis	Greece; Xenophon Kasdaglis; Aspasia Matsa

=== Medal table ===
Rank	Nation	Gold	Silver	Bronze	Total
1	France	3	1	0	4
2	Greece	1	3	2	6
3	Bohemia	0	0	2	2
Totals (3 entries)		4	4	4	12
