= Gerard Scheurleer =

Dutch field hockey and tennis player

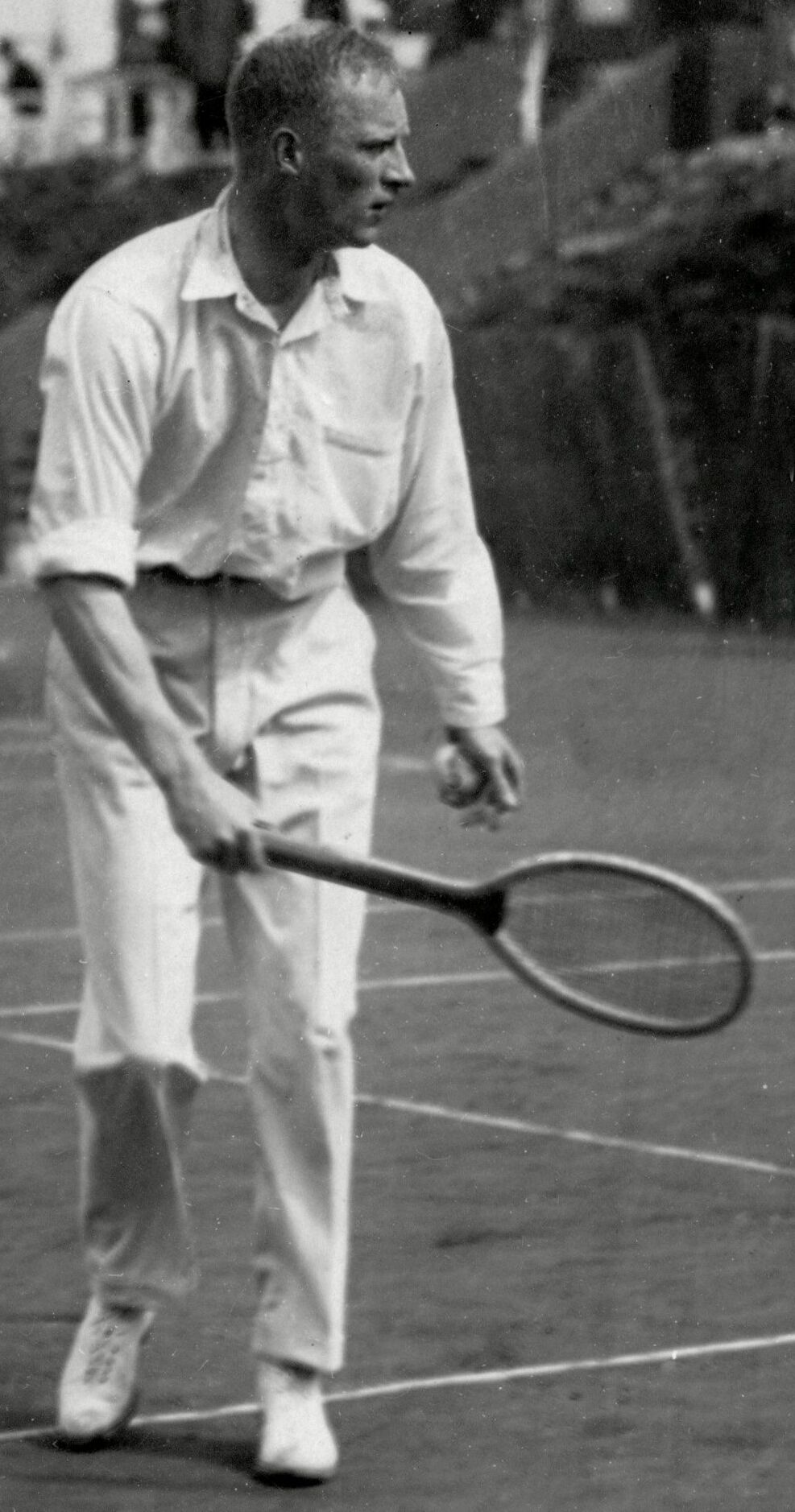
- G. Scheurleer, 1919
- Full name: Gerard Jacobus Scheurleer
- Country (sports): Netherlands
- Born: 29 May 1886 The Hague, Netherlands
- Died: 11 October 1948 (aged 62) The Hague, Netherlands

Singles

Grand Slam singles results
- Wimbledon: 3R (1920)

Other tournaments
- Olympic Games: SF (1906)

Doubles

Grand Slam doubles results
- Wimbledon: 1R (1919, 1920)

Other doubles tournaments
- Olympic Games: QF (1906)

Gerard Scheurleer (29 May 1886 – 11 October 1948), was a Dutch field hockey and tennis player who represented the Netherlands at the Intercalated Games. At the 1906 Intercalated Games he won his first three rounds of the singles event against Greek players to reach the semifinal which he lost to eventual gold medal winner Max Decugis. With compatriot Karel Beukema he also competed in the doubles event where they lost their first match, in the quarterfinal, against the French team and eventual gold medal winners Max Decugis and Maurice Germot.

Scheurleer competed in three Wimbledon Championships between 1919 and 1926. After wins against A. Wallis Myers and Nicolae Mișu he reached the third round of the singles event at the 1920 Wimbledon Championships which he lost to Frank Jarvis in straight sets. In the doubles he teamed up with E.G.de Seriere (1919), Christiaan Van Lennep (1920) and M.Wetselaar (1926) but did not make it past the first round.

In 1922, he lost his right leg in a motorcycle accident which ended his active playing career and also caused him severe phantom pain for the rest of his life. He subsequently became a coach to several Dutch players including Arthur Diemer Kool, Madzy Rollin Couquerque, Henk Timmer and Kea Bouman. He additionally authored several tennis books.
