= Xenophon Kasdaglis =

Egyptiote Greek tennis player (1880–1943)

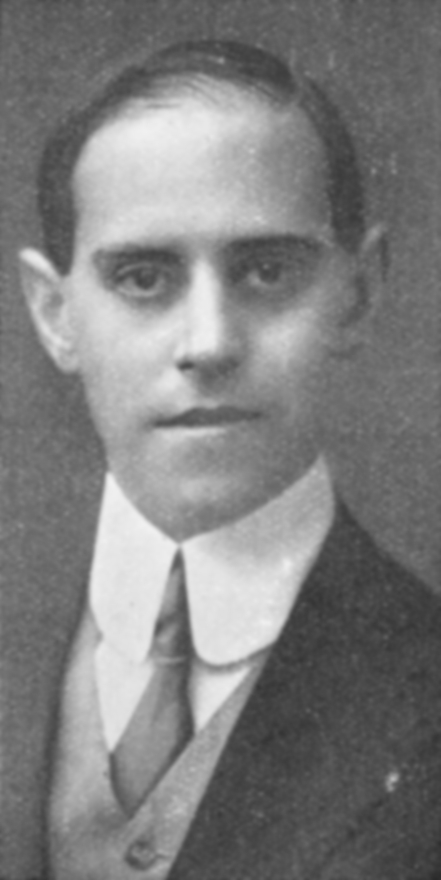
- Kasdaglis in 1908
- Full name: Xenophon Emmanuel Kasdaglis
- Country (sports): United Kingdom
- Born: 27 February 1880 Alexandria, Egypt
- Died: 2 May 1943 (aged 63) Manchester, Great Britain

Grand Slam singles results
- Wimbledon: 2R (1907)

Grand Slam doubles results
- French Open: W (1898)
- Wimbledon: SF (1907)

Grand Slam mixed doubles results
- Wimbledon: 2R (1922)
Medal record
Olympic Games – Tennis
Representing Greece
Silver medal – second place	1906 Athens	Doubles
Bronze medal – third place	1906 Athens	Mixed Doubles

Xenophon Emmanuel Kasdaglis, or Xenophon Casdagli, (Greek: Ξενοφών Εμμανουήλ Κάσδαγλης; 27 February 1880 – 2 May 1943) was an Egyptiote Greek – later a British citizen – tennis player. He competed in the 1906 Intercalated Games in Athens.

== Career ==
=== Olympic games ===
Kasdaglis participated in all three tennis events (singles, doubles and mixed doubles) at the 1906 Intercalated Games. In the singles he had a bye in the first round and lost to eventual Gold medal winner Max Decugis of France.

In the men's doubles tournament, Kasdaglis paired with Ioannis Ballis and won the Silver medal after they were defeated in the final by the French team of Max Decugis and Maurice Germot. In the mixed doubles he partnered Aspasia Matsa. They had a bye in the first round; and in the semifinals, they defeated compatriots Esmée Simirioti and Nikolaos Zarifis in straight sets. In the final, the French couple Marie and Max Decugis proved too strong. Kasdaglis and Matsa were awarded the bronze medal, whilst the Silver medal was awarded to their semifinal opponents Simirioti/Zarifis.

=== National championships ===
During his studies in Paris, Kasdaglis participated in the French Championships, where he won the men's doubles final in 1898 aside Marcel Vacherot.

Back in England he was a finalist in the singles event of the Northern Lawn Tennis Championships in 1903 and 1907. In 1908, Kasdaglis won the All-England mixed doubles title with Charlotte Cooper and defended his title in 1909 with Maude Garfit. (Note: The Mixed Doubles only became an official Championship event in 1913.)

He competed in singles and doubles events at the 1907 Wimbledon Championships. In the singles event, he won the first round match against E.W. Timmis but lost in the second round in straight sets to Wilberforce Eaves. In the doubles event, he partnered Major Ritchie and reached the semifinal, in which the eventual champions Norman Brookes and Anthony Wilding proved too strong. His second and last Wimbledon participation was at the 1922 Championships, where he played in the doubles and mixed doubles events and reached the second round in both.

He is the brother of tennis player Dimitrios Kasdaglis, participant in both 1896 Olympic and 1906 Intercalated games.

=== Personal life ===
Kasdaglis married Lucia Agelastos in 1908 and became father of a son (1910) and a daughter (1911). In 1943, he died from complications after a minor surgery.
