= Marie Decugis =

French tennis player

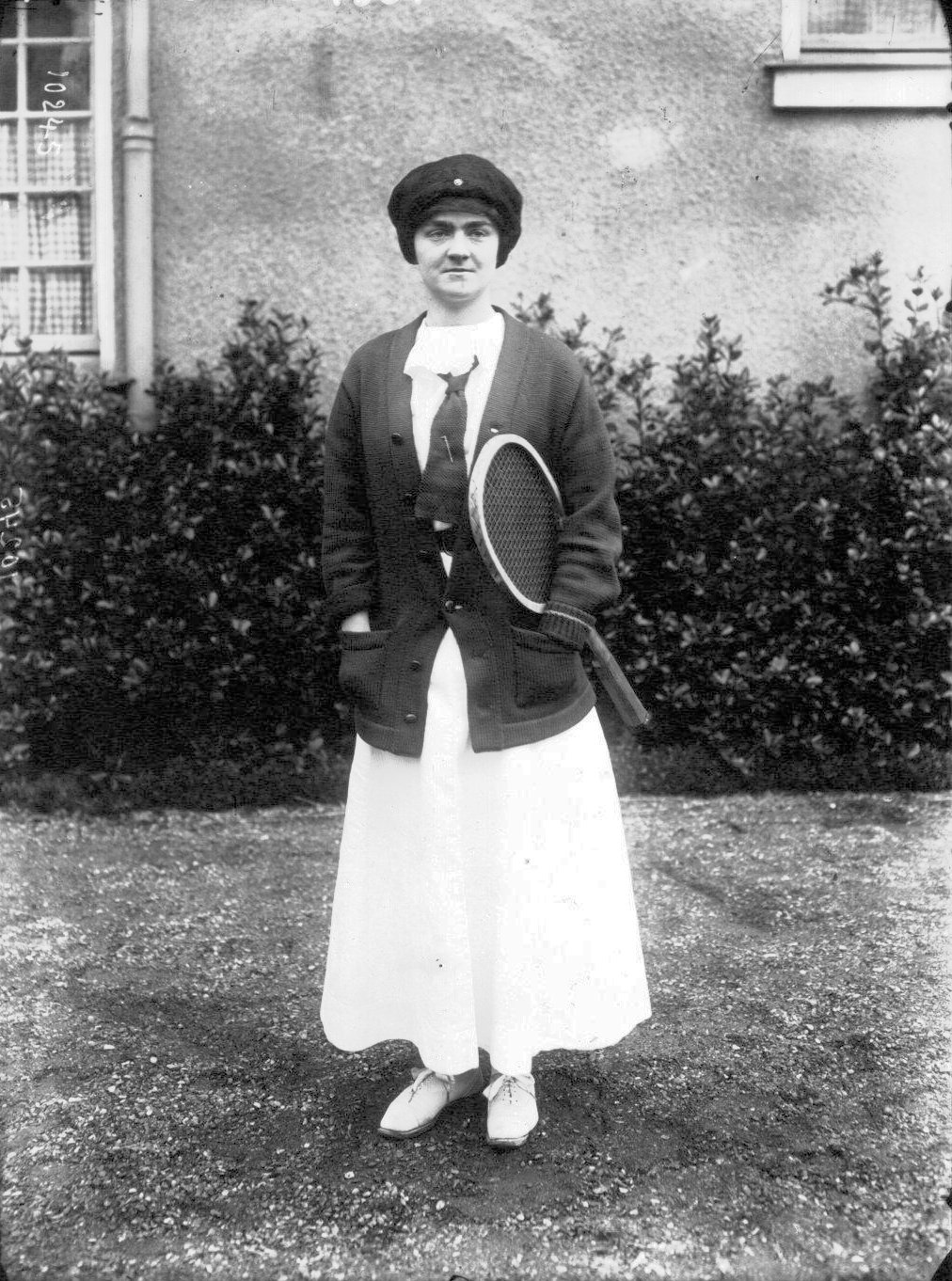
- Decugis in 1911
- Full name: Cornélie Gilberte Marie Décugis
- Country (sports): France
- Born: 7 August 1884 Dieppe, France
- Died: 4 May 1969 (aged 84) Grasse, France

Singles

Grand Slam singles results
- Wimbledon: 2R (1912)

Grand Slam mixed doubles results
- Wimbledon: 1R (1920)

Cornélie Gilberte Marie Décugis, sometimes spellt Decugis (née Flameng; 7 August 1884 – 4 May 1969) was a French tennis player.

== Life ==
Marie was born in 1884 the daughter of painter François Flameng (1856–1923) and his wife Marguerite Henriette Augusta (née Turquet; 1863–1919). She married the successful tennis player Max Decugis on 15 May 1905, at Paris. The couple had a daughter, Christiane Omer-Decugis (1909–1974).

Decugis won the title in mixed doubles, along with her husband, at the 1906 Intercalated Games at Athens. She played at the Wimbledon Championships in 1912 and 1920, but lost her initial match on both occasions.

She died at an age of 84 at Grasse.
