= Holmberg =

Holmberg is a Swedish surname formed from the words holm(e) meaning islet and berg meaning mountain. It is a relatively common name, at least in Sweden, which has to do with the fact that many Swedish place names contain the suffixes -holm, -holmen or -berg, -berga, -berget. Notable people with the surname include:

- Åke Holmberg (1907–1991), Swedish author and translator
- Anne Holmberg (born 1938), American writer of historical romance novels
- Arvid Holmberg (1886–1958), Swedish gymnast who competed in the 1908 Summer Olympics
- Barbro Holmberg (born 1952), Swedish Social Democratic politician
- Birgit Agda Holmberg (1921–2007), Swedish revue director, actress and singer
- Bo Holmberg (1942–2010), Swedish politician, widower of former Swedish Minister for Foreign Affairs Anna Lindh (1957–2003)
- Britta Holmberg (1921–2004), Swedish film actress
- Carl Holmberg (1884–1909), Swedish gymnast who competed in the 1908 Summer Olympics
- Carl-Erik Holmberg, Swedish football player active in the 1920s
- Cay Holmberg (born 1933), Swedish Navy officer
- Dennis Holmberg (born 1951), American minor league baseball player and major league coach
- Eduard Ladislas Kaunitz, baron von Holmberg (1778–1853), Austrian military officer who joined the Argentine revolutionary forces
- Eduardo Ladislao Holmberg (1852–1937), Argentine natural historian and novelist
- Elena Holmberg (1931–1978), assassinated Argentine diplomat
- Erik Holmberg (astronomer) (1908–2000), Swedish astronomer
- Erik Holmberg (football player) (1922–1998), Norwegian football player active in the 1950s
- Erik Holmberg (singer) (born 1970), musician in Swedish band Dive and music producer
- Erik Holmberg, director of the Swedish Institute at Athens (1947–1948)
- Gunnar Holmberg (1897–1975), Swedish football player who competed in the 1924 Summer Olympics
- Henric Holmberg (1946–2026), Swedish actor, director and scriptwriter
- Henrik Holmberg (born 1963), Swedish curler
- Henrik Johan Holmberg or Heinrich Johann Holmberg (1818–1864), Finnish naturalist, geologist and ethnographer
- Igge Holmberg (1966–2020), Ålandic politician
- John-Henri Holmberg (born 1949), Swedish author, critic, publisher and translator
- Jörgen Holmberg (born 1962), Swedish ice hockey player
- Joyce Holmberg (1930–2017), American educator and politician
- Kari Lise Holmberg (born 1951), Norwegian politician for the Conservative Party
- Krister Holmberg (born 1946), professor of Surface Chemistry at Chalmers University of Technology
- N. J. Holmberg (1878–1951), American farmer and politician
- Nils Holmberg (1902–1981), communist leader in Sweden
- Oswald Holmberg (1882–1969), Swedish gymnast and tug of war competitor
- Per Holmberg, passenger, SAS flight captain and survivor of the Scandinavian Airlines Flight 751 crash
- Peter Holmberg (born 1960), sailor from the U.S. Virgin Islands
- Pontus Holmberg (born 1999), Swedish ice hockey player
- Ray Holmberg (born 1944), former North Dakota state senator and convicted child sex offender
- Rob Holmberg (born 1971), American football linebacker
- Rolf Holmberg (1914–1979), Norwegian football player who competed in the 1936 Summer Olympics
- Ronald Holmberg (born 1938), American tennis instructor

== See also ==
- Holmberg IX, a dwarf irregular galaxy and a satellite galaxy of M81
- 3573 Holmberg, a Main-belt asteroid discovered on August 16, 1982
