= Granfelt =

Granfelt is a Nordic surname that may refer to

- Ben Granfelt (born 1963), Finnish guitarist
- Erik Granfelt (1883–1962), Swedish gymnast, brother of Nils and Hans
- George Granfelt (1865–1917), Finnish lawyer and politician
- Hans Granfelt (1897–1963), Swedish fencer and discus thrower
- Hanna Granfelt (1884-1952), Finnish opera singer
- Hjalmar Granfelt (1874–1957), Finnish legal scholar, professor and politician
- Nils Granfelt (1887–1959), Swedish gymnast, brother of Erik and Hans
