= Sweden at the 1906 Intercalated Games =

Sweden at the Olympics

- IOC code: SWE
- NOC: Swedish Olympic Committee

in Athens
- Competitors: 39 in 8 sports
- Medals Ranked 7th: Gold 2 Silver 5 Bronze 7 Total 14

Summer appearances
- 1896; 1900; 1904; 1908; 1912; 1920; 1924; 1928; 1932; 1936; 1948; 1952; 1956; 1960; 1964; 1968; 1972; 1976; 1980; 1984; 1988; 1992; 1996; 2000; 2004; 2008; 2012; 2016; 2020; 2024; 2028

Winter appearances
- 1924; 1928; 1932; 1936; 1948; 1952; 1956; 1960; 1964; 1968; 1972; 1976; 1980; 1984; 1988; 1992; 1994; 1998; 2002; 2006; 2010; 2014; 2018; 2022; 2026

Sweden competed at the 1906 Intercalated Games in Athens, Greece. 39 athletes, all men, competed in 37 events in 8 sports.

== Athletics ==
Track

| Athlete | Events | Heat | | Semifinals | | Final | |
| Athlete | Events | Result | Rank | Result | Rank | Result | Rank |
|---|---|---|---|---|---|---|---|
| Knut Lindberg | 100 metres | 11.8 | 1 Q | Unknown | 2 Q | Unknown | 6 |
| Axel Ljung | 100 metres | Unknown | 2 Q | Unknown | 4 | did not advance | |
| Gunnar Rönström | 100 metres | Unknown | 5 | did not advance | | | |
| Kristian Hellström | 800 metres | 2:05.8 | 1 Q | n/a | | Unknown | 5 |
| Ernst Serrander | 800 metres | Unknown | 3 | n/a | | did not advance | |
| Hjalmar Mellander | 800 metres | Unknown | Unknown | n/a | | did not advance | |
| Kristian Hellström | 1500 metres | Unknown | 2 Q | n/a | | 4:13.4 | 3rd place, bronze medalist(s) |
| Edward Dahl | 1500 metres | Unknown | Unknown | n/a | | did not advance | |
| John Svanberg | 5 mile | n/a | | | | 26:19.4 | 2nd place, silver medalist(s) |
| Edward Dahl | 5 mile | n/a | | | | 26:26.2 | 3rd place, bronze medalist(s) |
| Ernst Serrander | 5 mile | n/a | | | | Unknown | Unknown |
| John Svanberg | Marathon | n/a | | | | 2-58:20.8 | 2nd place, silver medalist(s) |
| Gustaf Törnros | Marathon | n/a | | | | 3-01:00.0 | 4 |
| Thure Bergvall | Marathon | n/a | | | | did not finish | |
| Axel Ljung | 110 metres hurdles | Unknown | 3 | n/a | | did not advance | |

Field

| Athlete | Events | Final | |
| Athlete | Events | Result | Rank |
|---|---|---|---|
| Gunnar Rönström | High jump | 1.700 | 5 |
| Bruno Söderström | High jump | 1.675 | 6 |
| Bruno Söderström | Pole Vault | 3.400 | 2nd place, silver medalist(s) |
| Hjalmar Mellander | Long jump | 6.585 | 4 |
| Gunnar Rönström | Long jump | 6.150 | 7 |
| Axel Ljung | Standing long jump | 2.955 | 5 |
| Hjalmar Johansson | Standing long jump | 2.690 | 19 |
| Eric Lemming | Standing long jump | 2.535 | 26 |
| Eric Lemming | Triple jump | 12.195 | 13 |
| Eric Lemming | Shot put | 11.260 | 3rd place, bronze medalist(s) |
| Eric Lemming | Stone throw | 18.210 | 4 |
| Eric Lemming | Discus | 35.620 | 4 |
| Eric Lemming | Discus Greek style | Unknown | Unknown |
| Eric Lemming | Javelin Freestyle | 53.900 WR | 1st place, gold medalist(s) |
| Knut Lindberg | Javelin Freestyle | 45.170 | 2nd place, silver medalist(s) |
| Bruno Söderström | Javelin Freestyle | 44.920 | 3rd place, bronze medalist(s) |
| Hjalmar Mellander | Javelin Freestyle | 44.300 | 4 |
| Hjalmar Mellander | Pentathlon (Ancient) | 24 | 1st place, gold medalist(s) |
| Eric Lemming | Pentathlon (Ancient) | 29 | 3rd place, bronze medalist(s) |
| Knut Lindberg | Pentathlon (Ancient) | 37 | 5 |

== Cycling ==
| Athlete | Events | Heat | | Semifinals | | Final | |
| Athlete | Events | Result | Rank | Result | Rank | Result | Rank |
|---|---|---|---|---|---|---|---|
| Andrew Hansson | Individual road race | n/a | | | | did not finish | |
| Andrew Hansson | Sprint | Unknown | Unknown | Unknown | Unknown | did not advance | |
| Andrew Hansson | 333 metres time trial | n/a | | | | 24 2/5 | 13 |
| Andrew Hansson | 5000 metres | Unknown | Unknown | did not advance | | | |

== Diving ==
| Athlete | Event | Points | Rank |
|---|---|---|---|
| Hjalmar Johansson | 10 m platform | 143.4 | 6 |
| Robert Andersson | 10 m platform | 142.2 | 7 |
| Einar Rosengren | 10 m platform | 137.6 | 9 |
| Emil Lundberg | 10 m platform | 135.4 | 10 |
| Gerlach Richter | 10 m platform | 134.0 | 11 |
| Otto Hagborg | 10 m platform | 133.8 | 12 |
| Wilhelm Lindgren | 10 m platform | 130.6 | 13 |
| Sigfrid Larsson | 10 m platform | 131.2 | 14 |
| Alfred Johansson | 10 m platform | 129.2 | 15 |
| Axel Norling | 10 m platform | 127.4 | 16 |
| Johan Andersson | 10 m platform | did not finish | |

== Fencing ==
| Athlete | Events | Heat Group | Semifinal Group | Final Group |
| Athlete | Events | Rank | Rank | Rank |
|---|---|---|---|---|
| Emil Fick | Individual Foil | 3 | did not advance | |
| Karl Hjorth | Individual Foil | Unknown | did not advance | |
| Emil Fick | Individual Épée | 1 Q | Unknown | did not advance |

== Shooting ==
| Athlete | Event | Target Hits | Points | Rank |
|---|---|---|---|---|
| Johan Hübner von Holst | Free pistol, 25 metres | 30 | 239 | 5 |
| Eric Carlberg | Free pistol, 25 metres | 30 | 229 | 11 |
| Vilhelm Carlberg | Free pistol, 25 metres | 30 | 220 | 16 |
| Johan Hübner von Holst | Free pistol, 50 metres | 30 | 196 | 10 |
| Eric Carlberg | Free pistol, 50 metres | 29 | 185 | 18 |
| Vilhelm Carlberg | Free pistol, 50 metres | 30 | 179 | 22 |
| Eric Carlberg | Gras Model Revolver, 20 metres | 29 | 179 | 18 |
| Vilhelm Carlberg | Gras Model Revolver, 20 metres | 28 | 136 | 22 |
| Johan Hübner von Holst | Military Revolver, 20 metres | 30 | 210 | 21 |
| Vilhelm Carlberg | Military Revolver, 20 metres | 30 | 204 | 25 |
| Eric Carlberg | Military Revolver, 20 metres | 30 | 203 | 27 |
| Eric Carlberg | Dueling Pistol Au Visé, 20 metres | 28 | 192 | 14 |
| Johan Hübner von Holst | Dueling Pistol Au Visé, 20 metres | 27 | 163 | 19 |
| Vilhelm Carlberg | Dueling Pistol Au Visé, 20 metres | did not finish | | |
| Johan Hübner von Holst | Dueling Pistol Au Commandement, 25 metres | 27 | 115 | 2nd place, silver medalist(s) |
| Vilhelm Carlberg | Dueling Pistol Au Commandement, 25 metres | 26 | 115 | 3rd place, bronze medalist(s) |
| Eric Carlberg | Dueling Pistol Au Commandement, 25 metres | 20 | 93 | 13 |
| Vilhelm Carlberg | Free Rifle any position, 300 metres | 30 | 207 | 16 |
| Johan Hübner von Holst | Free Rifle any position, 300 metres | 29 | 179 | 25 |
| Eric Carlberg | Free Rifle any position, 300 metres | 28 | 155 | 29 |
| Vilhelm Carlberg | Rifle Kneeling or Standing, 300 metres | 30 | 191 | 18 |
| Johan Hübner von Holst | Rifle Kneeling or Standing, 300 metres | 28 | 164 | 26 |
| Eric Carlberg | Rifle Kneeling or Standing, 300 metres | 29 | 151 | 28 |

== Swimming ==
| Athlete | Events | Heat | | Final | |
| Athlete | Events | Result | Rank | Result | Rank |
|---|---|---|---|---|---|
| Hjalmar Johansson | 100 metres freestyle | Unknown | 4 Q | Unknown | 8 |
| Robert Andersson | 100 metres freestyle | Unknown | 4 Q | Unknown | 9 |
| Harald Julin | 100 metres freestyle | Unknown | 6 | did not advance | |
| Charles Norelius | One mile freestyle | n/a | | did not finish | |
| Nils Regnell | One mile freestyle | n/a | | did not finish | |
| Gustaf Wretman | One mile freestyle | n/a | | did not finish | |
| Harald Julin; Gustaf Wretman; Charles Norelius; Nils Regnell | 4 x 250 metres freestyle relay | n/a | | Unknown | 5 |

== Tug of war ==
Athlete
Erik Granfelt
Gustaf Grönberger
Anton Gustafsson
Oswald Holmberg
Eric Lemming
Axel Norling
Carl Svensson
Ture Wersäll

All matches were best-of-three pulls.

Round 1

30 April 1906

| Sweden | 0–2 | Greece |

Bronze Medal Match

30 April 1906

| Sweden | 2–0 | Austria |

== Weightlifting ==
| Athlete | Event | Weight | Rank |
|---|---|---|---|
| Carl Svensson | One hand lift | 65.45 | 5 |
