= Meilichos =

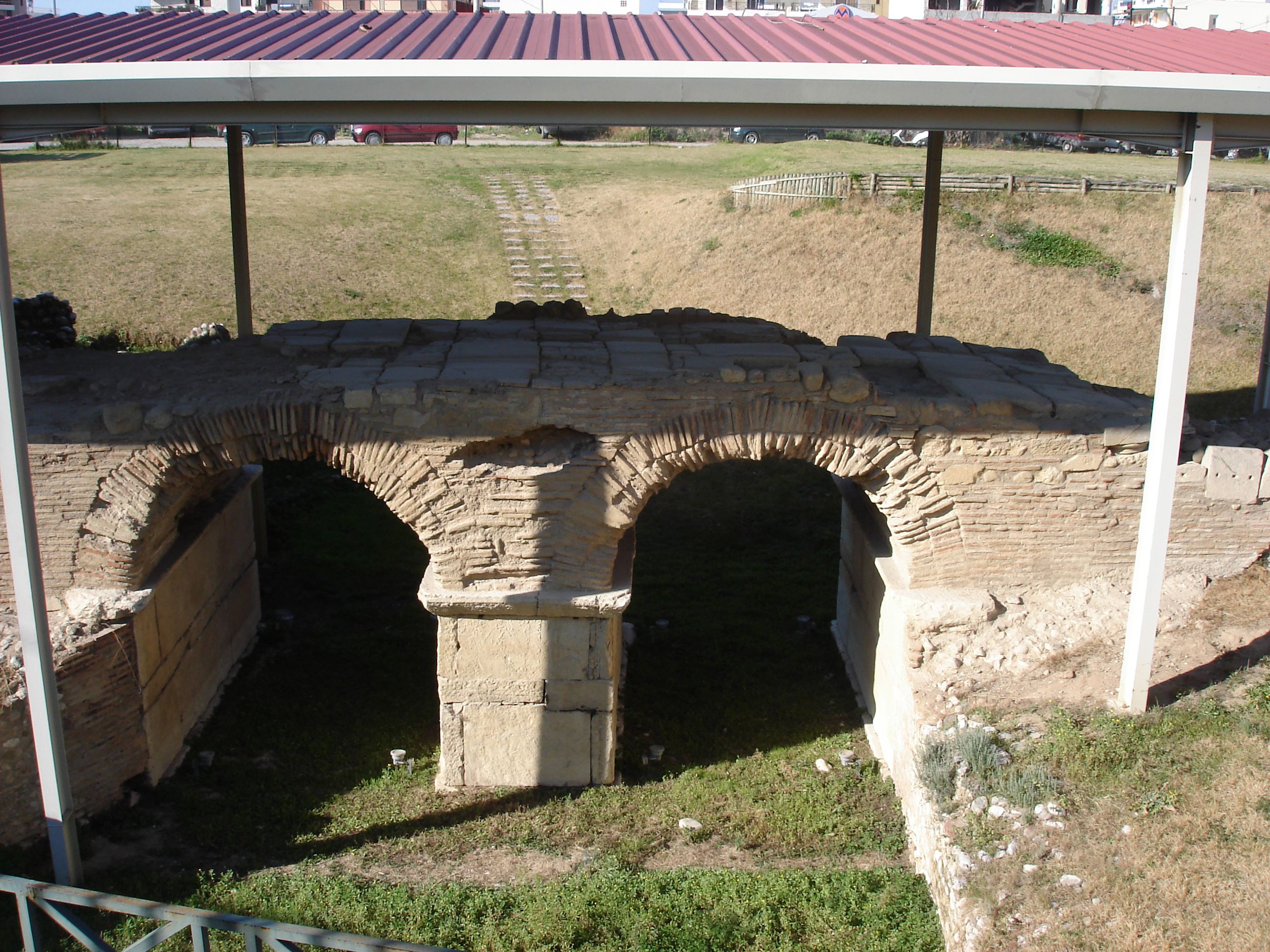
- The Roman bridge across Meilichos in Ampelokipoi, a neighbourhood of Patras

Location
- Country: Greece

Physical characteristics
- Source
  - location: Skioessa
- Mouth
  - location: Gulf of Patras
  - coordinates: 38.2695°N 21.7385°E
- Length: approximately 10 km (6.2 mi)

Meilichos (Greek: Μείλιχος, Latin: Meilichus) is a torrent in the northwestern part of Achaea, southern Greece. The river flows from a spring near Skioessa near the northern part of the Panachaiko mountain west of the ravine of Charadros to the Gulf of Patras. It passes north of Skioessa, under a viaduct of the A5 motorway, through the village Sychaina, now a neighbourhood of Patras, it empties west of the neighbourhood of Agyia.

In antiquity there was a temple of Artemis Triklaria near the river, but this has not yet been found by archaeologists. Near the intersection of present-day Aretha Street and the Greek National Road 8A in the Patras neighbourhood of Ampelokipoi, a bridge from the Roman era has been excavated. It currently has a covering which protects the structure from rain.
