= Kostas Davourlis Stadium =

Football stadium in Patras, Greece

- "Agyia"
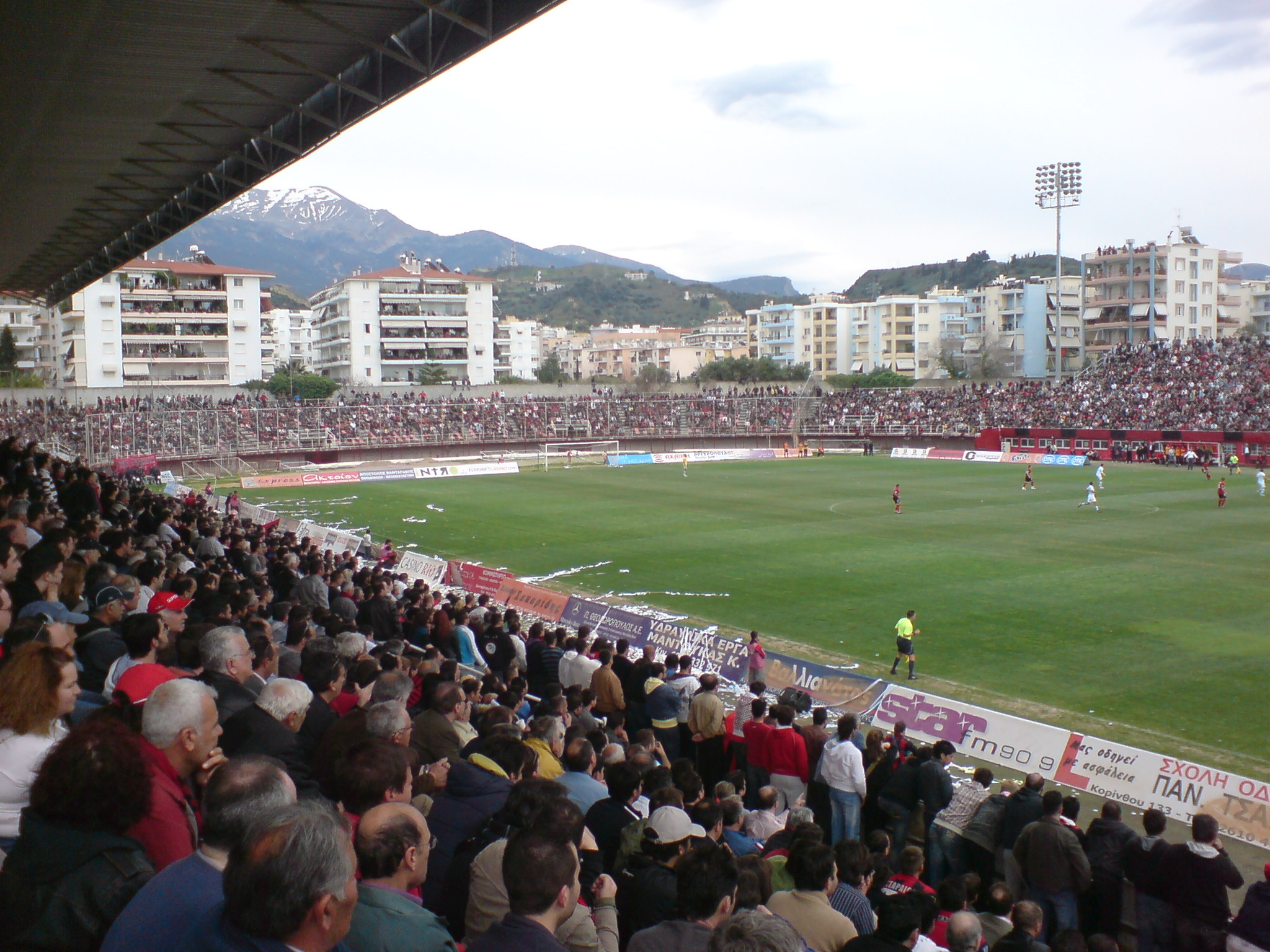
- Interactive map of Kostas Davourlis Stadium
- Former names: Panachaiki Stadium
- Location: Agyia, Patras, Greece
- Coordinates: 38°15′42″N 21°44′45″E
- Owner: Panachaiki GE
- Operator: Panachaiki GE
- Capacity: 11,321
- Surface: Grass

Construction
- Groundbreaking: 1935
- Opened: June 6, 1939
- Renovated: 2000

Tenant
- Panachaiki

Kostas Davourlis Stadium is a stadium in Patras, Greece. It is the home of Panachaiki. Work on the grounds started in 1935. Originally called Stadium of Panachaiki, it has been officially renamed Kostas Davourlis in 1992 after the great football player who died the same year.

== History ==
It was inaugurated on June 6, 1939. Kostas Davourlis Stadium originally had one stand (south). It acquired its present horseshoe-like shape in 1974. The stadium is in a much better condition today than a few years ago. The placement of plastic seats and the construction of the roof (north stand) in 1997; the refurbishment of facilities below the stands (VIP club, cafeteria, club shop) and the installation of floodlights in 2000 have done much to upgrade it.

The capacity of the stadium has changed frequently, peaking at 22,000 after a 1974 expansion. Since then there have been a number of reductions due to modernisations. Record attendance is 21.350 in a football match between Olympiacos and Panathinaikos in 1982.

Adjacent the Kostas Davourlis Stadium is Panachaiki's arena for indoor sports, built in 1984.

=== Potential improvements ===
The stadium can become much better, as there are still many problems. Access to the stadium and the lack of parking spaces are probably the most important of these. There is talk that a large car park will be constructed on the western side of the stadium, but this will only go through if the necessary funds are secured.

== Notable matches ==
- 1939: Panachaiki 3 - Asteras Patras 1, friendly match
- 1974: Panachaiki 1 - FC Twente 1, 1973–74 UEFA Cup
- 1976: Greece 0 - Israel - 1, friendly match

== Gallery ==
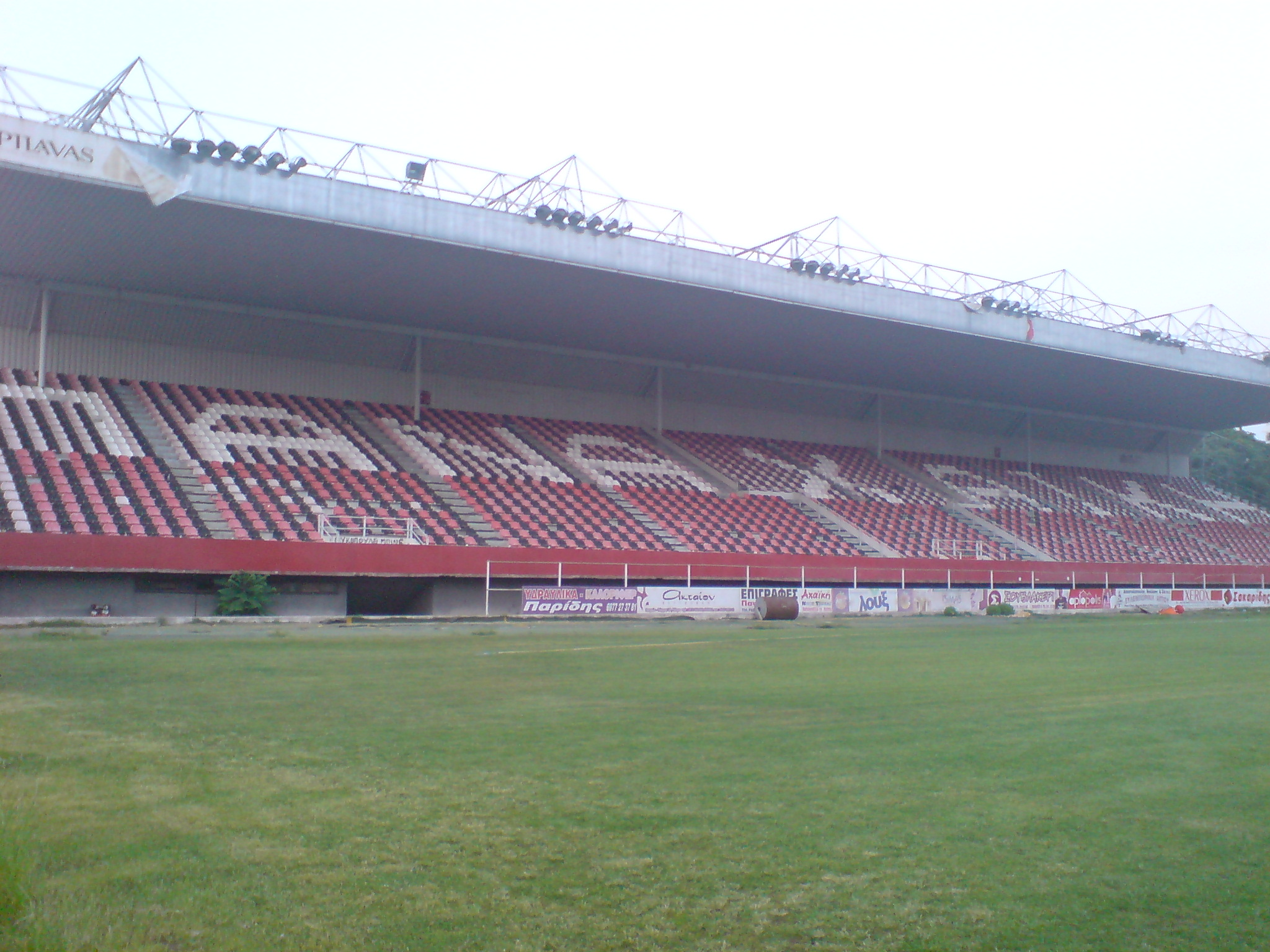
Picture of the roofed stand, a place where the fanatics are placed

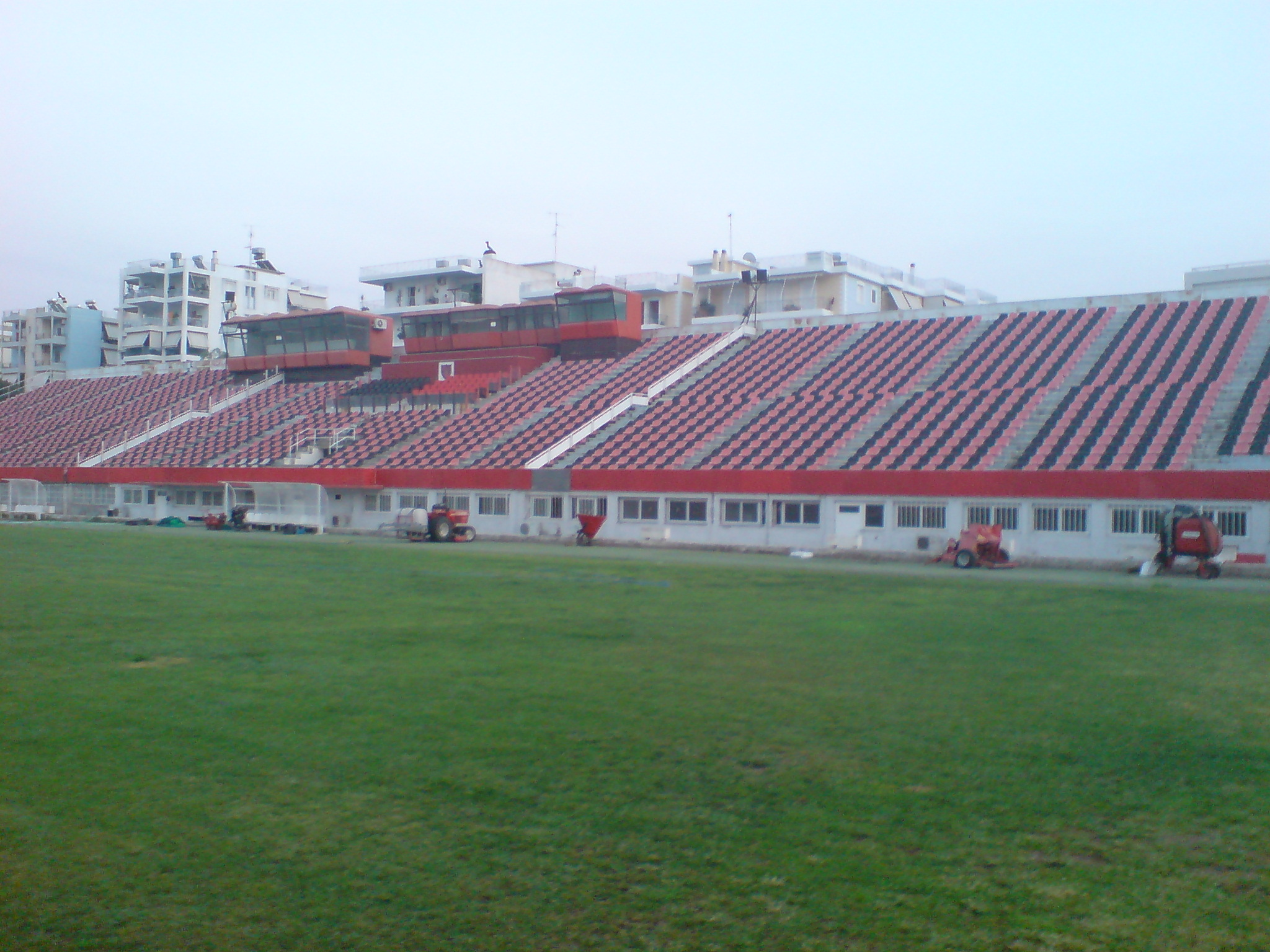
View of the stand where the VIP's and reporters are placed

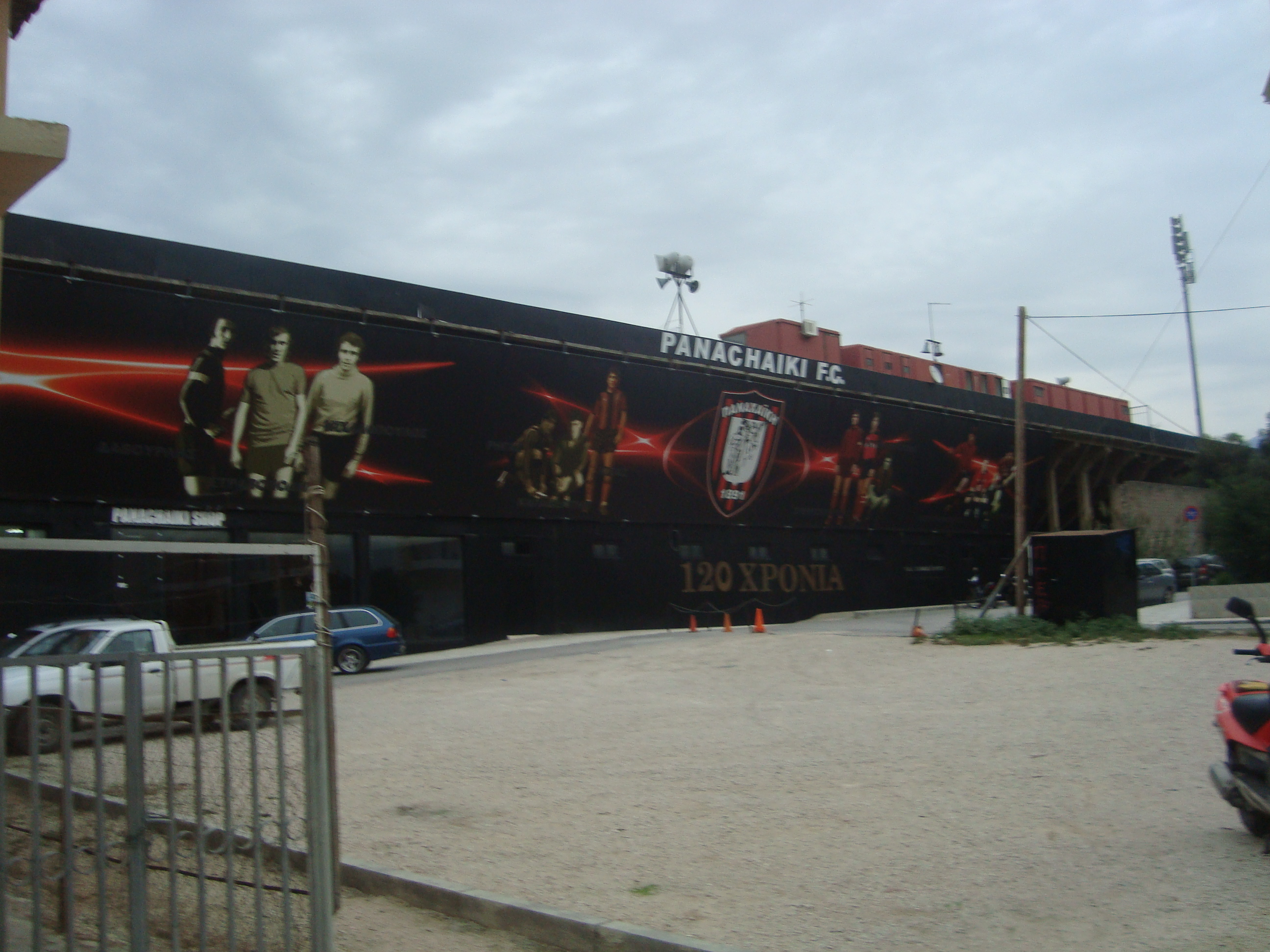
Outside view

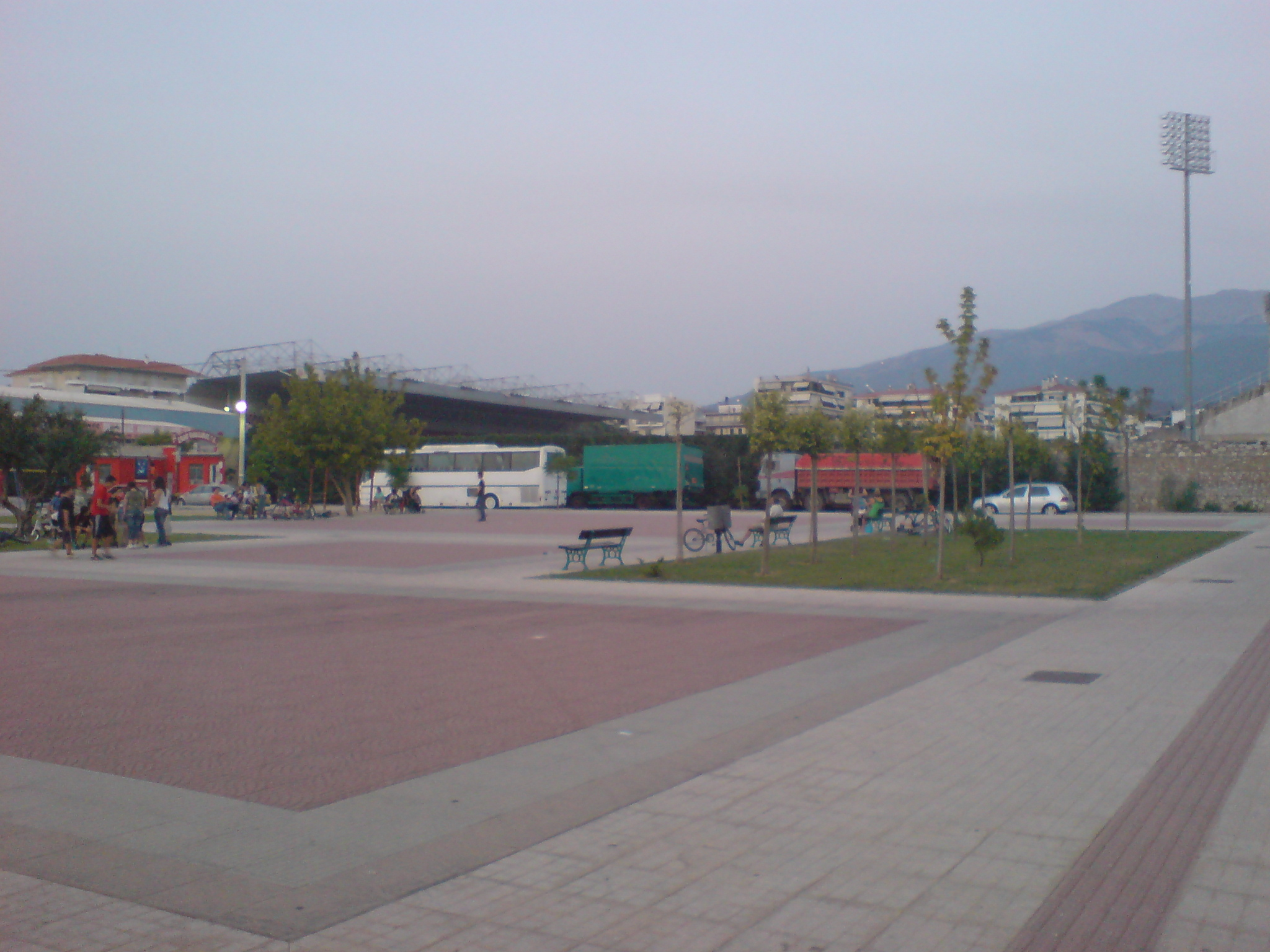
Outside view of the stadium, where a playground was recently constructed

== Notes ==
- PANACHAIKI F.C. Official website (in Greek)
