= Vassilios Psachos =

Greek tug of war competitor

Medal record

Men's Tug of war

Representing Greece

Intercalated Games
Silver medal – second place	1906 Athens	Team

Vassilios Psachos (Greek: Βασίλειος Ψάχος), also Psakhos; 1877–?) was a Greek tug of war athlete from Zarouchleika, Patras. He was the younger brother of Georgios Psachos.

Psachos was a member of Gymnastiki Etaireia Patron, that merged in 1923 with Panachaikos Gymnastikos syllogos to become Panachaiki Gymnastiki Enosi.

He competed for Greece in the 1906 Intercalated Games held in Athens, Greece, where he won the Silver medal in the tug of war competition.
