= Mycenaean cemetery of Voudeni =

Archaeological site in Western Greece

- Μυκηναϊκό νεκροταφείο Βούντενης (Greek)
- Patras Mycenaean Park
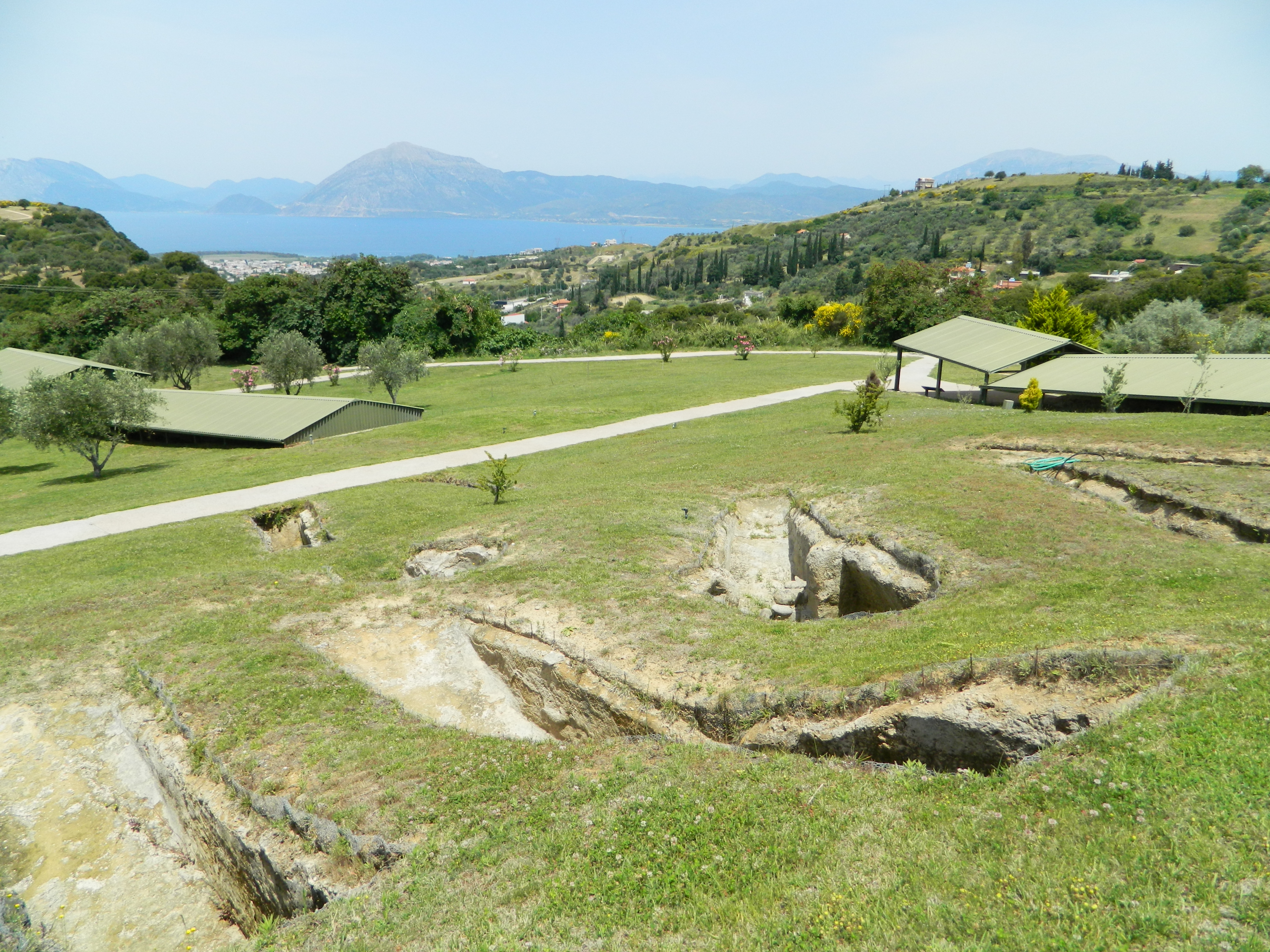
- Site of the cemetery on the hill inside the park

- Location in Greece
- 38°15′13.34″N 21°46′50.88″E
- Type: Mycenaean cemetery and settlement
- Periods: Mycenaean Greece
- Location: Patras
- Region: Western Greece, Greece

History
- Built: 1500 BC
- Abandoned: 1050 BC

Site notes
- Elevation: 220 m (720 ft)
- Excavation dates: 1923-1924, 1988-1994, 2004-2007
- Archaeologists: Nikolaos Kyparissis, Lazaros Kolonas
- Owner: Ministry of Culture
- Management: 6th Ephorate of Prehistoric and Classical Antiquities
- Public access: Open to visitors

The Mycenaean cemetery of Voudeni (Greek: Μυκηναϊκό νεκροταφείο Βούντενης) along with the Mycenaean settlement at the locality of Bortzi, comprise the Patras Mycenaean Park (Μυκηναϊκό Πάρκο Πατρών), located near the settlement of Voudeni (also known as Skioessa) of the Municipality of Patras in Western Greece. The archaeological site of a total area of 180 acres is located at an altitude of 220 meters, 7 kilometers northeast of Patras, has been transformed into a recreational park. It includes 78 carved tombs and the ruins of a prehistoric settlement, possibly identified with that of ancient Mesatis. First archaeological excavations began in 1923 by Nikolaos Kyparissis. Many of the findings such as vases, clay statuettes, bronze artifacts, tools, weapons and jewellery have been transported and exhibited at the nearby Archaeological Museum of Patras.

== Settlement ==
The prehistoric settlement of Voudeni, lasting approximately five hundred years (1500–1050 BC), was one of the most prominent regional sites of the periphery of the Mycenaean world. Due to the natural fortification and hiding provided by the Bortzi hill at the foot of Mt. Panachaiko, the settlement was the center of a wider set of smaller settlements developed in the surrounding lowland areas. Geographical position played an important role in the establishment and development of the settlement, as it provided observation of the sea as well as an easy escape route to the mountains in case of an emergency or danger. A natural harbor located at the present day marsh of Agyia, provided access to the sea, allowing control of the entire gulf of Patras. Also, the rich and fertile stretches of land could provide sufficient agricultural and livestock products for the self-sufficiency of the community. The existence of a soft soil allowed the creation of a cemetery southeast of the settlement on the hillside (Amygdalia position), to the west of the present day settlement of Voudeni.

== Cemetery ==
West of the present day settlement of Voudeni and southeast of the prehistoric settlement, at Amygdalia position, excavations firstly led by archaeologists Nikolaos Kyparissis and later on by Lazaros Kolonas, revealed a Mycenaean cemetery. On a total area of 18 acres, 78 chamber tombs of various shapes and sizes were discovered, with a recent research suggesting a dozen more possible tombs. Most of the explored graves were carved in circular, square, horseshoe or quadrilateral form with a dome, of varying dimensions often housing multiple burials. Some of the largest tombs are number 4 and 75, which are presumed to belong to officials or community lords due to their large size. All of the tombs revealed objects of everyday life, such as vases, jewellery, tools, weapons and utensils, that prove the prosperity and commercial relations of the locals. Most of the objects were transferred to warehouses and the most important finds are exhibited at the nearby newly found archaeological museum of Patras.

== Image gallery ==
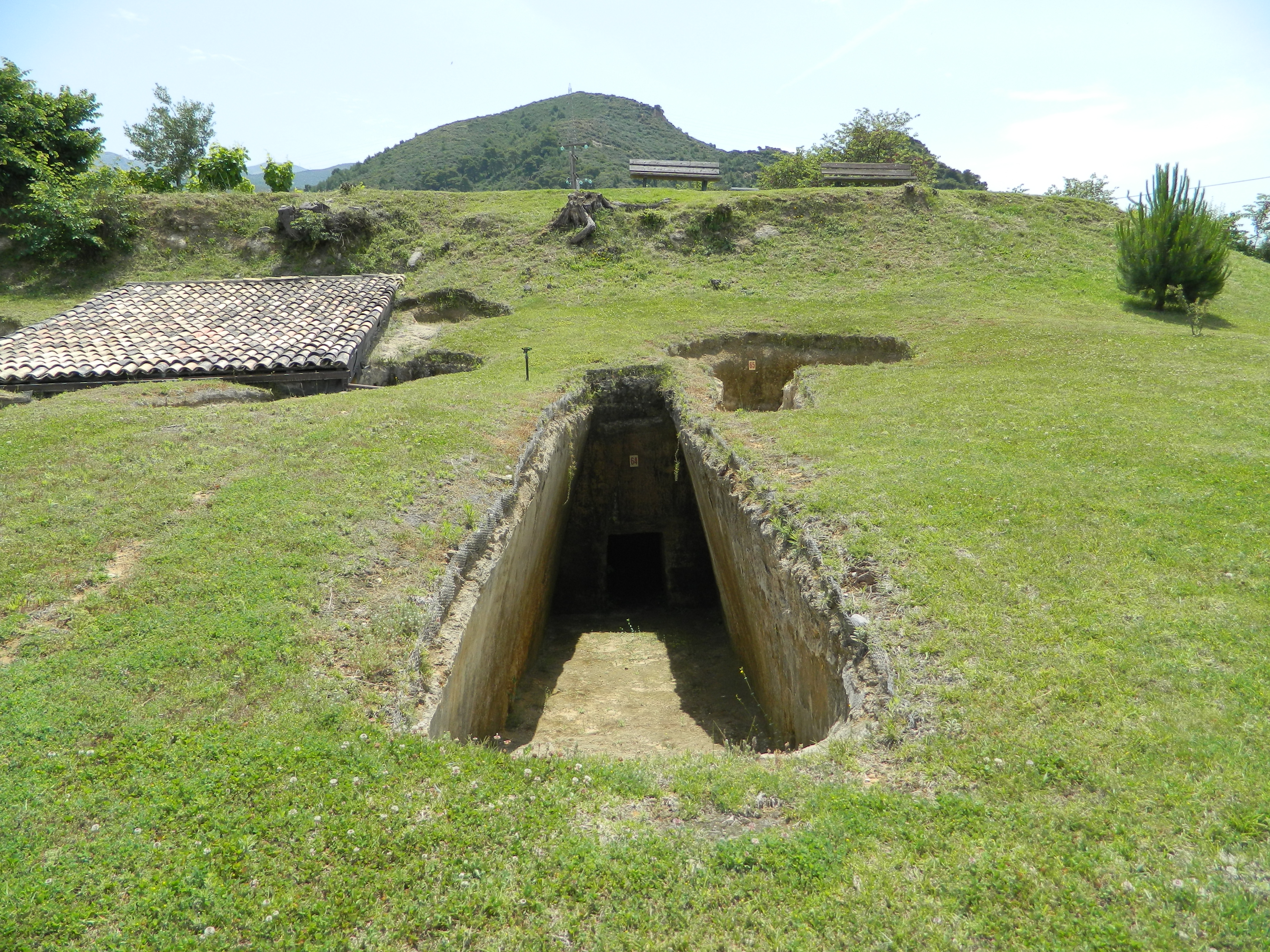
Tombs in the park

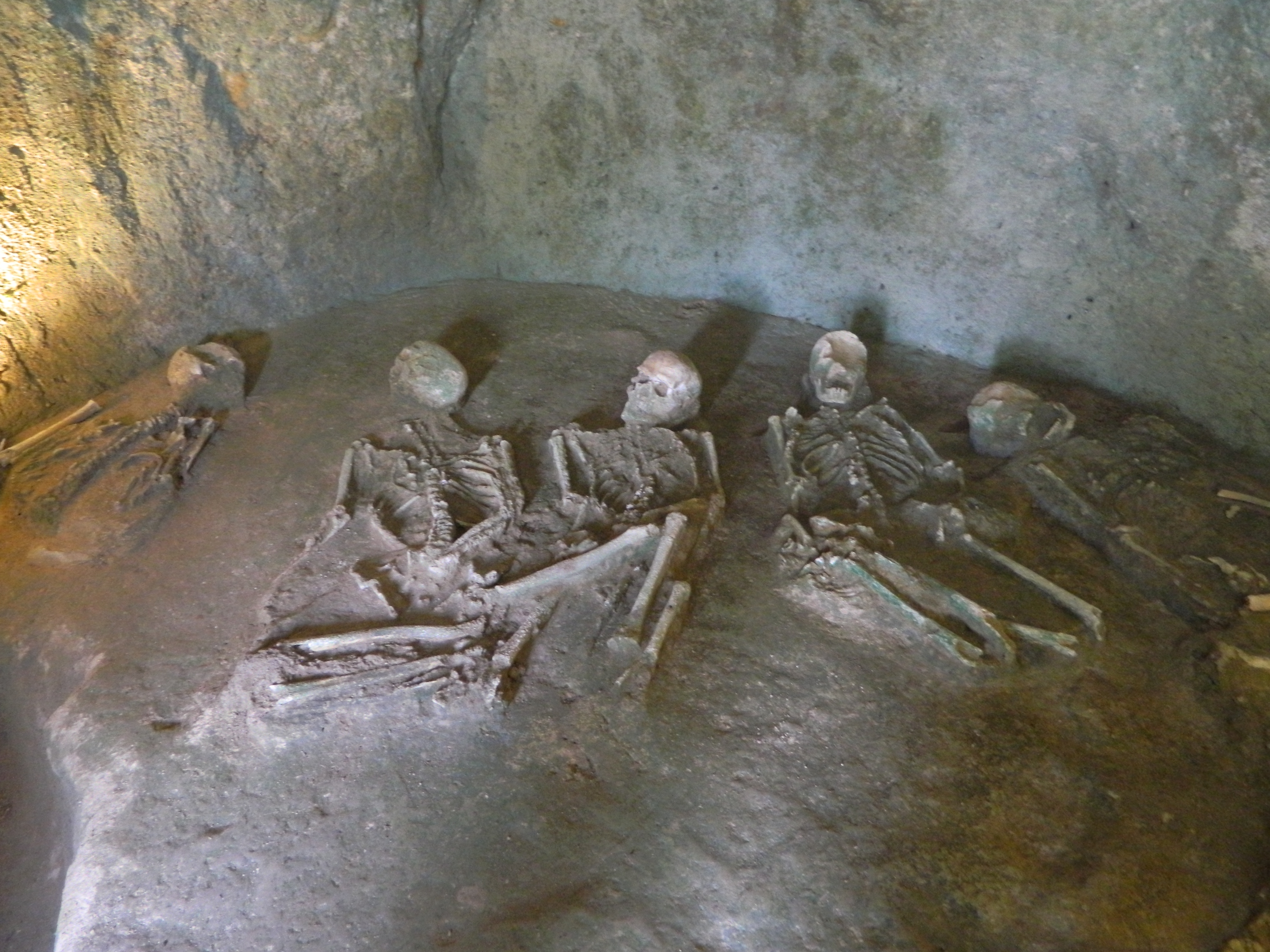
Dead warriors in tomb No 5

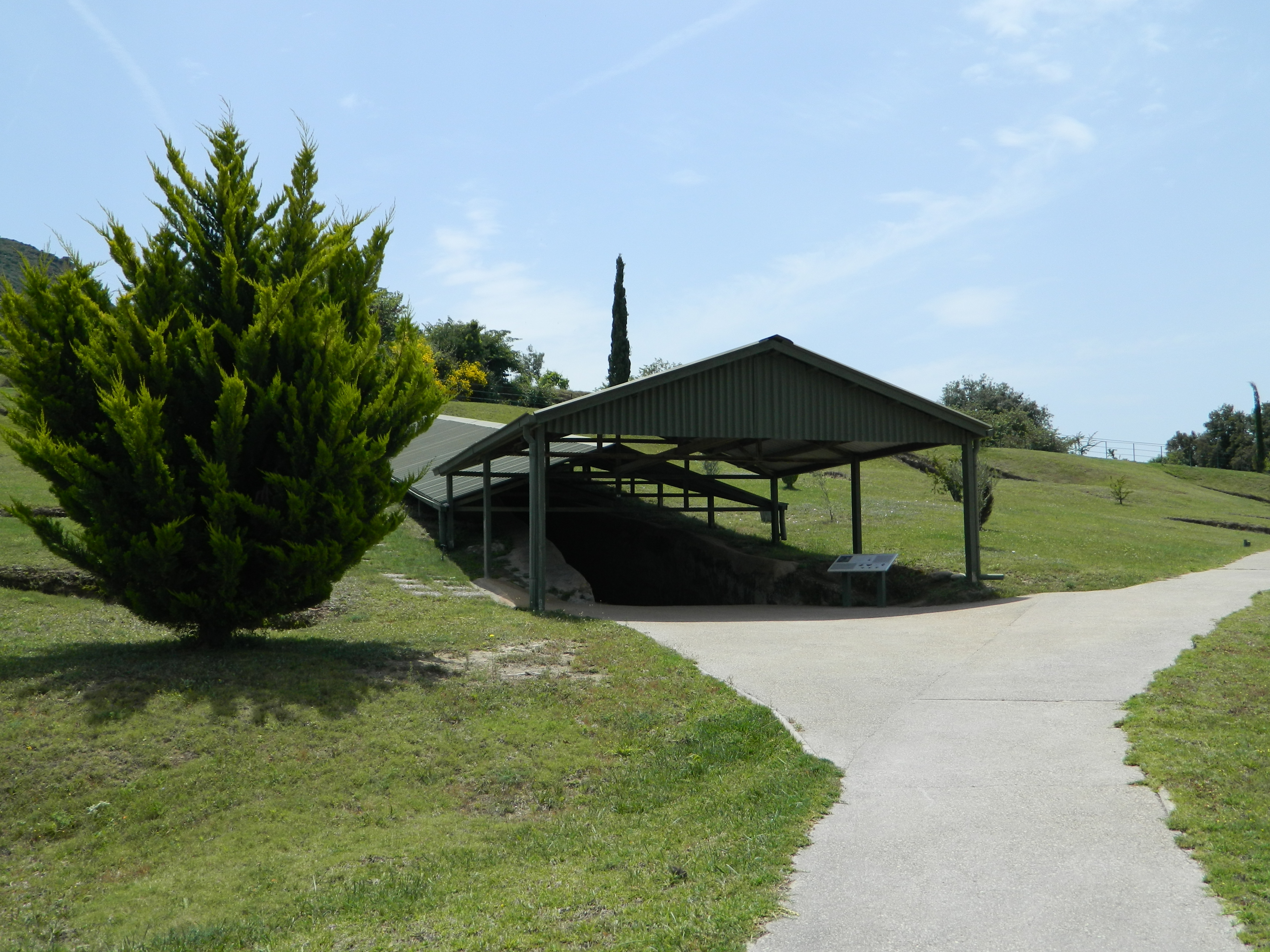
Tomb No 4

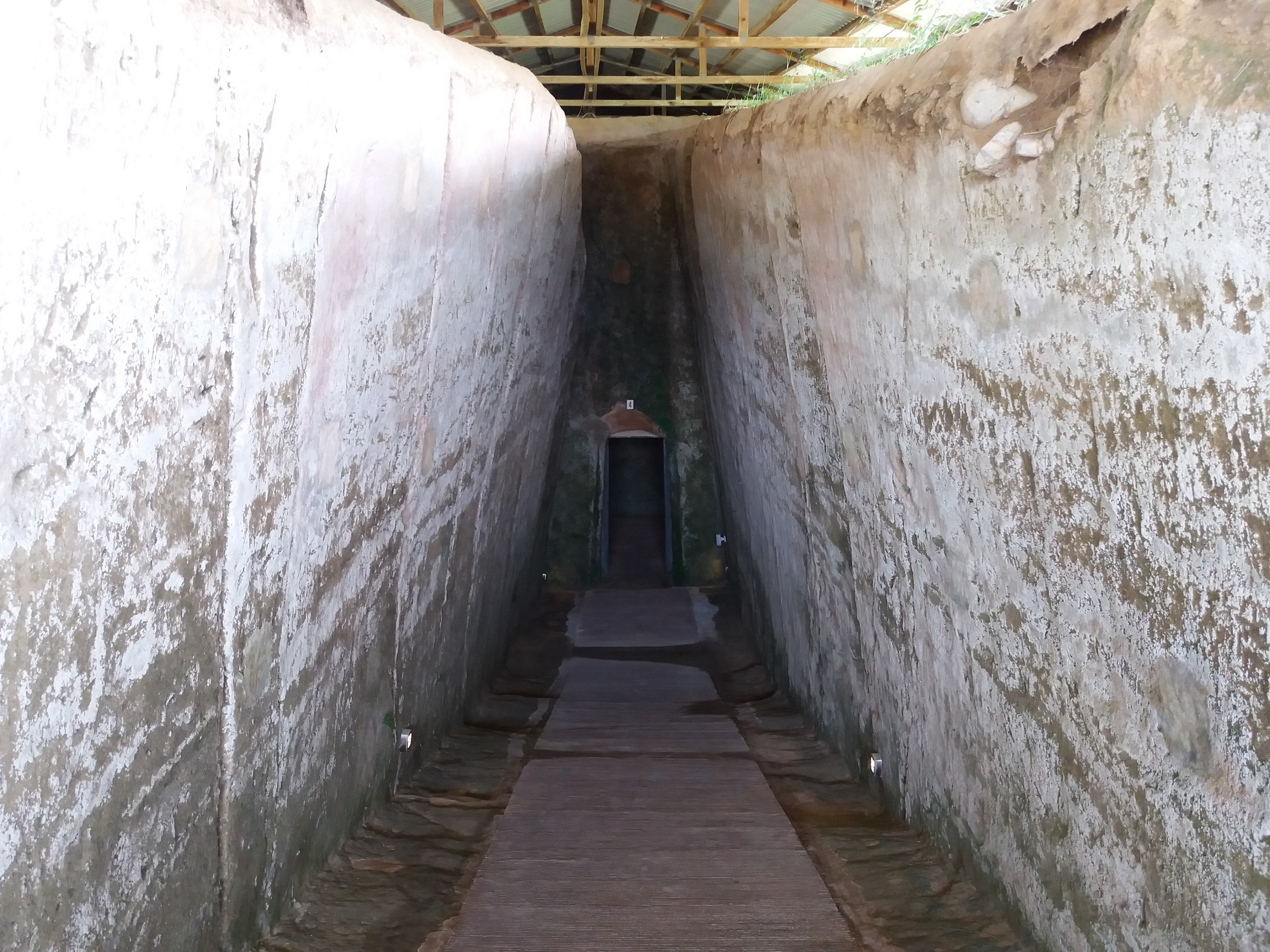
Entrance of tomb No 4

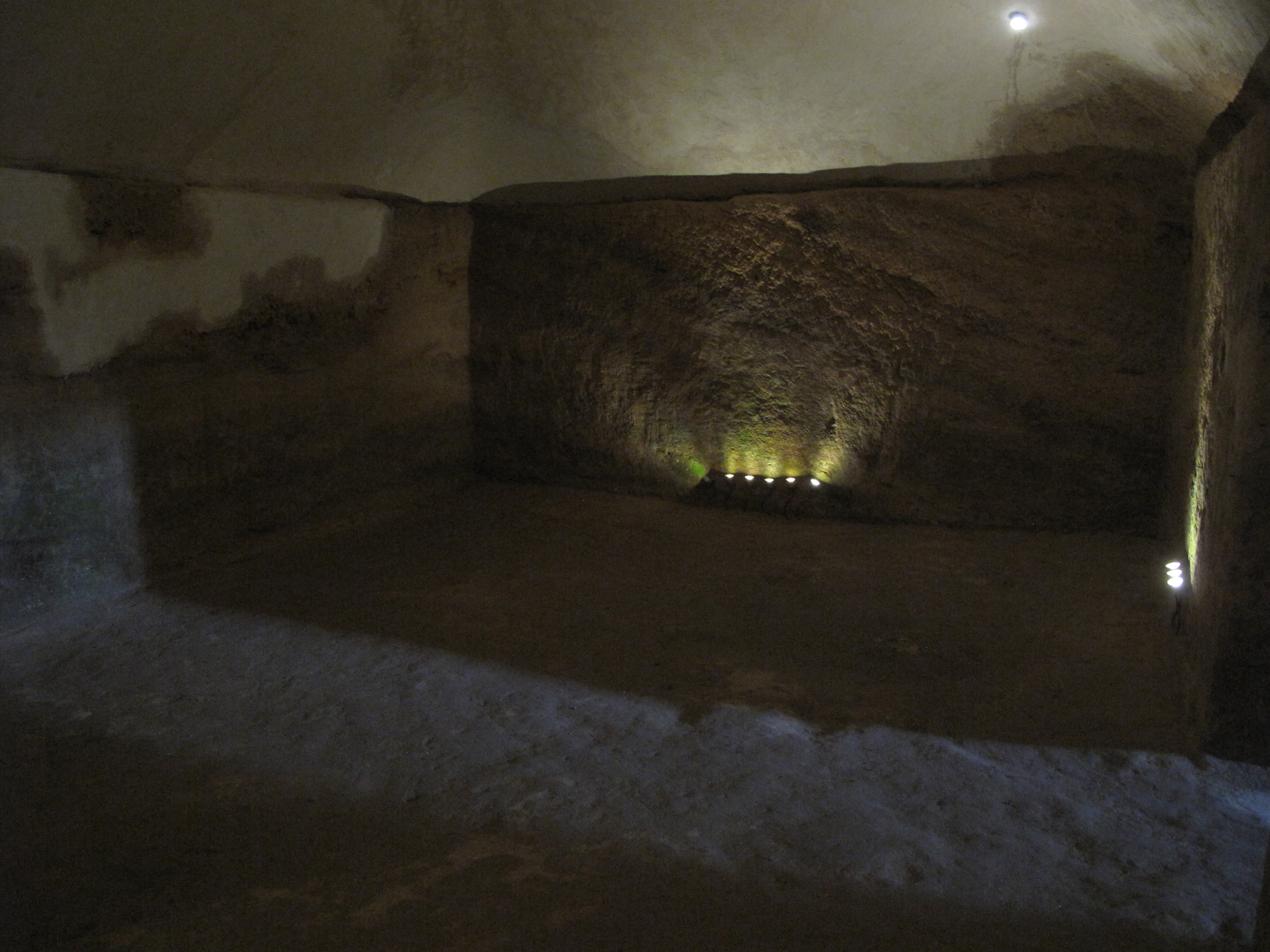
Interior of tomb No 75

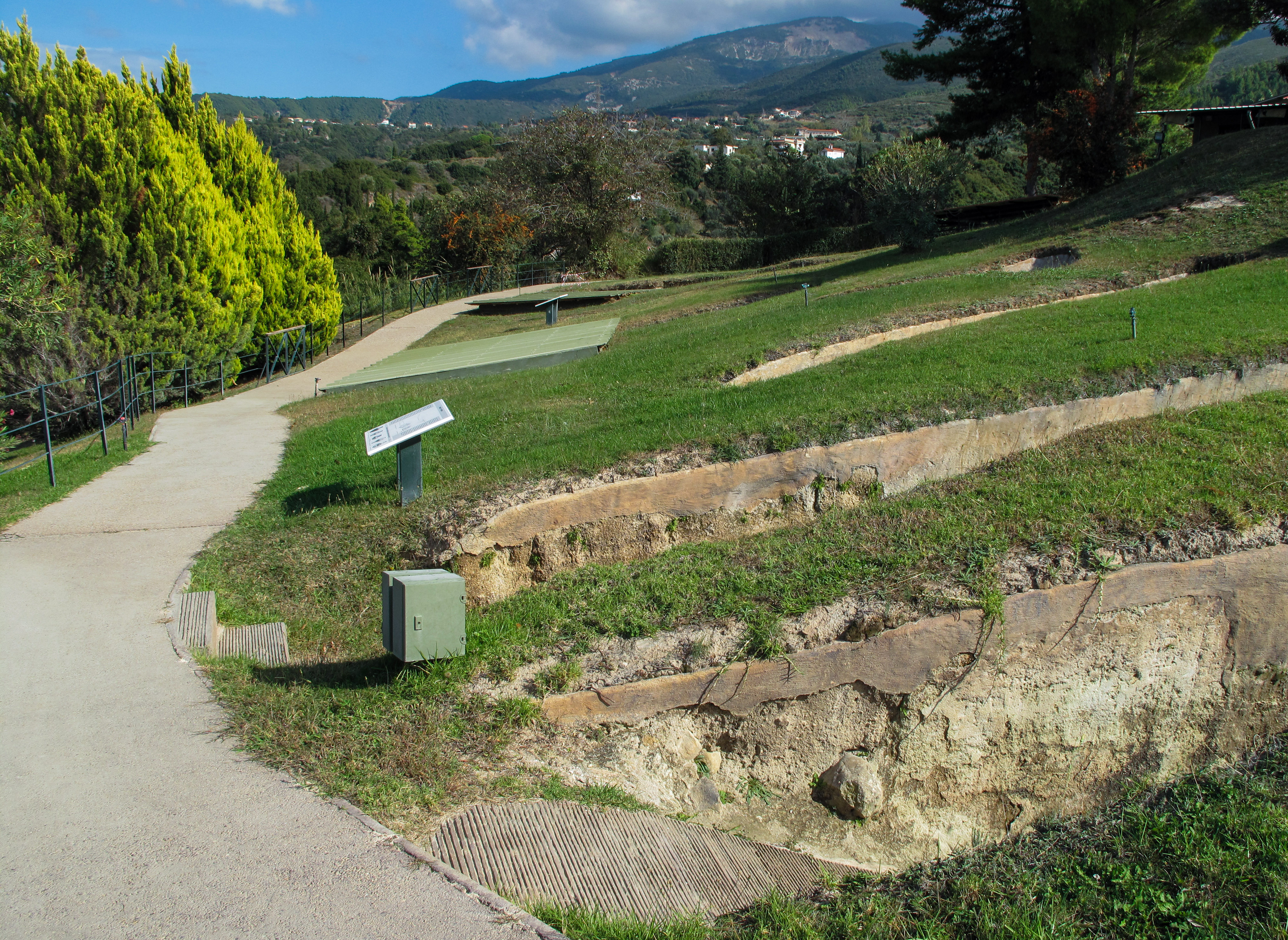
Path in the cemetery park

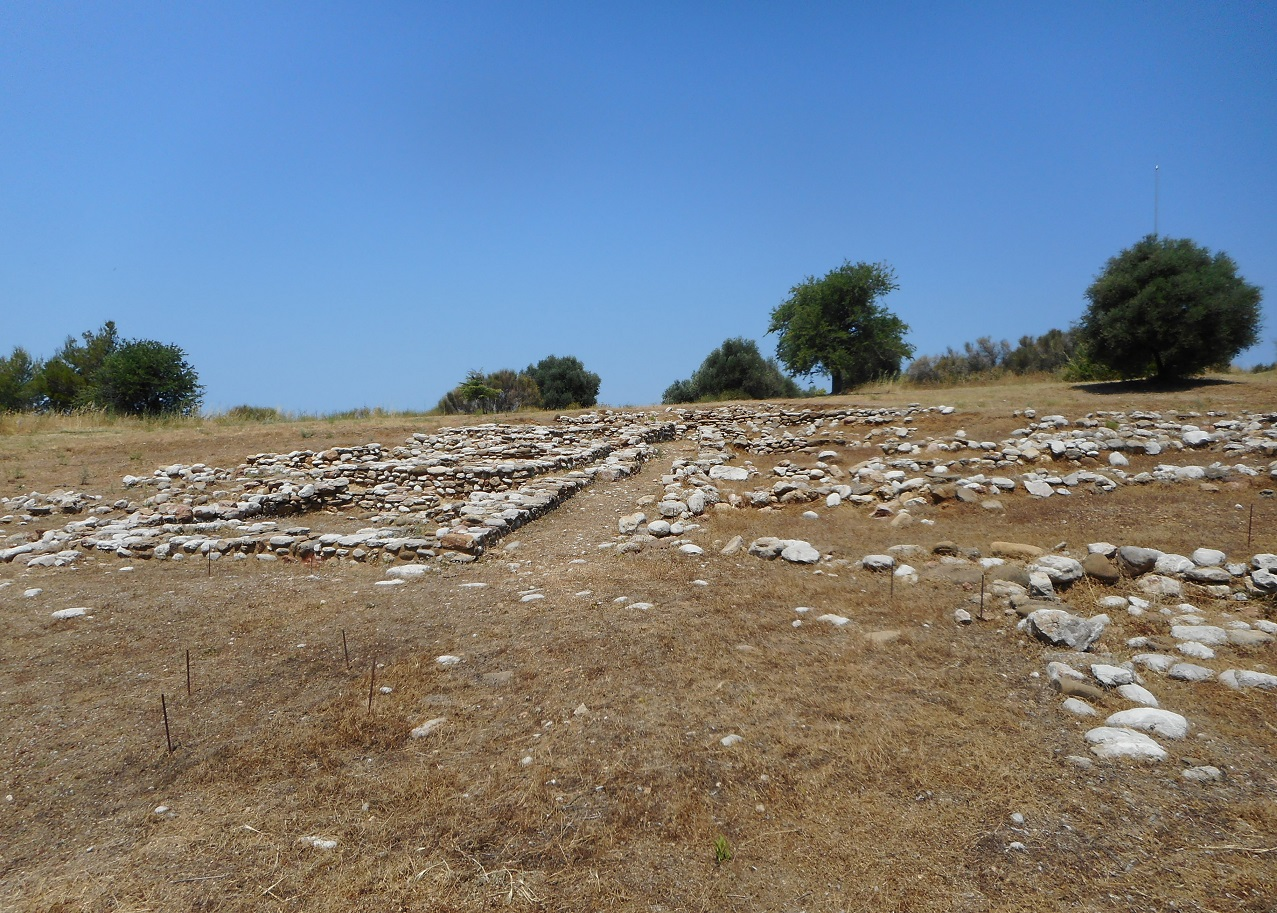
The Settlement
