= Tug of war at the 1906 Intercalated Games =

At the 1906 Summer Olympics in Athens, a tug of war event was contested. Now called the Intercalated Games, the 1906 Games are no longer considered as an official Olympic Games by the International Olympic Committee.

== Medal summary ==
Event	Gold	Silver	Bronze
Tug of war	Germany; Karl Kaltenbach; Josef Krämer; Heinrich Rondi; Wilhelm Dörr; Wilhelm Ritzenhoff; Julius Wagner; Heinrich Schneidereit; Wilhelm Born	Greece; Spyros Lazaros; Antonios Tsitas; Spyros Vellas; Vassilios Psachos; Konstantinos Lazaros; Georgios Papachristou; Panagiotis Triboulidas; Georgios Psachos	Sweden; Anton Gustafsson; Ture Wersäll; Erik Granfelt; Eric Lemming; Carl Svensson; Axel Norling; Oswald Holmberg; Gustaf Grönberger
