= Gustaf Grönberger =

Swedish tug of war competitor

Olympic medal record

Men's Tug of war

1906 Intercalated Games
Bronze medal – third place	1906 Athens	Team

Andreas Gustaf Grönberger (Stockholm Sweden, 12 June 1882 – Stockholm, 29 August 1972) was an athlete who won bronze medal at the 1906 Intercalated Games in tug of war.

He competed at the Tug war at the Games. There was direct elimination during the game. At first round Greece defeated Sweden, who later won at the round for the bronze medal against Austria

== Sources ==
- Data
- Data
