= Konstantinos Lazaros =

Greek tug of war athlete

Medal record

Tug of war

Representing Greece

Intercalated Games
Silver medal – second place	1906 Athens	Team

Konstantinos Lazaros (Greek: Κωνσταντίνος Λάζαρος; born 1877) was a Greek tug of war athlete.

Lazaros was a member of Gymnastiki Etaireia Patron, that merged in 1923 with Panachaikos Gymnastikos syllogos to become Panachaiki Gymnastiki Enosi.

He competed for Greece in the 1906 Intercalated Games held in Athens, Greece, where he won the silver medal in the tug of war competition.
