= Kostas Davourlis =

Greek footballer

Konstantinos Davourlis
Personal information
- Full name: Konstantinos Davourlis
- Date of birth: 4 January 1948
- Place of birth: Agyia, Patras, Greece
- Date of death: 23 May 1992 (aged 44)
- Height: 1.76 m (5 ft 9 in)
- Position: Attacking midfielder

Youth career
- 1962–1964: Panionios Patron

Senior career*
Years	Team	Apps	(Gls)
1965–1974	Panachaiki	111	(47)
1974–1977	Olympiacos	74	(23)
1977–1981	Panachaiki	132	(25)
1981–1982	Panegialios	30	(5)
1982–1985	Panachaiki	72	(7)
1985–1986	AFC Patrai	29	(8)
1986–1987	Panegialios	2	(0)

International career
1969–1977	Greece	11	(2)
- * Club domestic league appearances and goals

Konstantinos Davourlis (Greek: Κώστας Δαβουρλής, 4 January 1948 – 23 May 1992) born in Agyia, Patras, popularly nicknamed The Black Prince, was a former Greek footballer who played as an attacking midfielder. A gifted and talented player, he was voted by the Greek sports magazine "Ethnosport" as one of the 50 best Greek football players ever.

Having gained fame in Greece as the creative playmaker for Panachaiki, Davourlis attracted even more attention during the 1973 season, when he helped his team become the first Greek countryside football club ever to qualify for a European competition (the 1974 UEFA Cup).

Davourlis was famed for his technical ability, his ball skill, his creative passes and his powerful shot in or outside the box; furthermore, his leadership was exemplary. He was also a notable free kick taker, as demonstrated by his numerous goals from outside the penalty area.

In spite of the fact that his career had a rather bitter end for a player of his caliber, he is still worshiped by fans all over the Peloponnese. The Panachaiki Stadium bears his name since 1992, when he died due to a heart attack.

== Club career ==
=== Early career, Panionios Patron and Panachaiki 1962–1971 ===
Davourlis was born in Patras. Having been discovered by Panachaiki former player and scouter Spyros Voulgarakis, he began his playing career at the age of fourteen with a Panchaiki subsidiary team, Panionios Patron. Two years later he joined the senior team and contributed to Panachaiki's battle to reach the Greek first division. His most notable achievement at that time was that he became the first Greek football player to be selected for the national team while playing for a second division team.

Finally, after several unsuccessful attempts, Panachaiki made it to the "big" division in 1969 and Davourlis' talent shone. However, the team was involved in a bribery scandal and sunk again to the lower division. Fortunately enough for Davourlis, they were back a year later and the Black Prince of Patras led Panachaiki's rise towards glory.

=== Panachaiki and Olympiacos 1971–1978 ===
In the 1972 season, Davourlis scored 15 goals and Panachaiki finished sixth. The best was still to come though. After an amazing 1973 season in which he scored again 15 goals, including a hat trick in Toumba Stadium against championship contender PAOK, he achieved with Panachaiki something that no other Greek countryside club ever had done at the time: participation in a European competition, for instance the 1974 UEFA Cup. In 1974, Davourlis' performances and leadership were still very good but rumors related to his transfer affected him considerably. Panachaiki proved to be unable to become a real threat to the local powerhouses and finished once again sixth. At the end of a season during which he scored 11 times in the Championship and once in the UEFA Cup, Davourlis was transferred to Olympiacos. The transfer fee was 9.25 million Drachmas, the highest in Greek football history at the time.

At Olympiacos, Davourlis was one of the top players of the team, along with Georgios Delikaris, Yves Triantafyllos and Julio Losada. His team won one Greek Championship title and reached two consecutive Greek Cup finals, winning thanks to his goal in 1975 and losing in 1976. Nevertheless, his heart was travelling somewhere else.

=== Panachaiki 1978–1985 ===
In 1978, when Davourlis was transferred back to Panachaiki, almost nothing in Patras remained of the glorious team that fascinated Greece in the first half of the decade. Davourlis' presence increased the level of the team, but the results remained poor, leading to the club's relegation to the Second Division in 1981 and once again in 1985. He ended his career with Korinthos in 1986. Later on, he worked for Panachaiki as a scouter discovering many talents until the year he died, the most famous of whom is Grigoris Georgatos.

== International career ==
Davourlis earned his first cap with Greece on 23 July 1969, coming in as a substitute in the 75th minute of a friendly match against Australia. Had Davourlis spent more years playing for a Greek powerhouse, the number of his national team selections would have been undoubtedly higher.

=== Appearances for the Greece national football team ===
1. 23 July 1969 Αustralia – Greece 2–2 (substitute 75’) – friendly match
2. 18 June 1971 Greece – Malta 2–0 (90 minutes) – scored in the 60’- 1972 UEFA European Football Championship qualifying
3. 6 July 1971 Mexico – Greece 1–1 (substitute 45’) – scored in the 86’- friendly match
4. 30 September 1971 Greece – Μexico 0–1 (90 minutes) – friendly match
5. 1 December 1971 Greece – England 0–2 (substitute 73’) – 1972 UEFA European Football Championship qualifying
6. 16 February 1972 Greece – Holland 0–5 (substitute 45’) – friendly match
7. 19 November 1972 Yugoslavia – Greece 1–0 (substitute 73’) – 1974 FIFA World Cup qualification
8. 6 May 1976 Greece – Poland 1–0 (90 minutes) – friendly match
9. 22 September 1976 Greece – Ιsrael 0–1 (90 minutes) – friendly match
10. 9 October 1976 Greece – Hungary 1–1 (substitute 58’) – 1978 FIFA World Cup qualification (UEFA)
11. 26 January 1977 Ιsrael – Greece 1–1 (substitute 85’) – friendly match

== Statistics ==
- 1 Greek Championship Title (1975)
- 1 Greek football Cup (1975)
- He scored a total of 95 goals in his career
- He scored a total of 22 goals by free kick in his career, second best record behind the one of Kostas Frantzeskos
