= Skioessa =

Coordinates: 38°15′31″N 21°47′12″E

Skioessa (Greek: Σκιόεσσα, meaning "umbrageous", before 1955: Βούντενη - Voudeni) is a neighbourhood and a settlement in the northeastern part of the city of Patras. Skioessa had a population of 529 in 2021. The previous name of this suburb, Voudeni, is still in use.

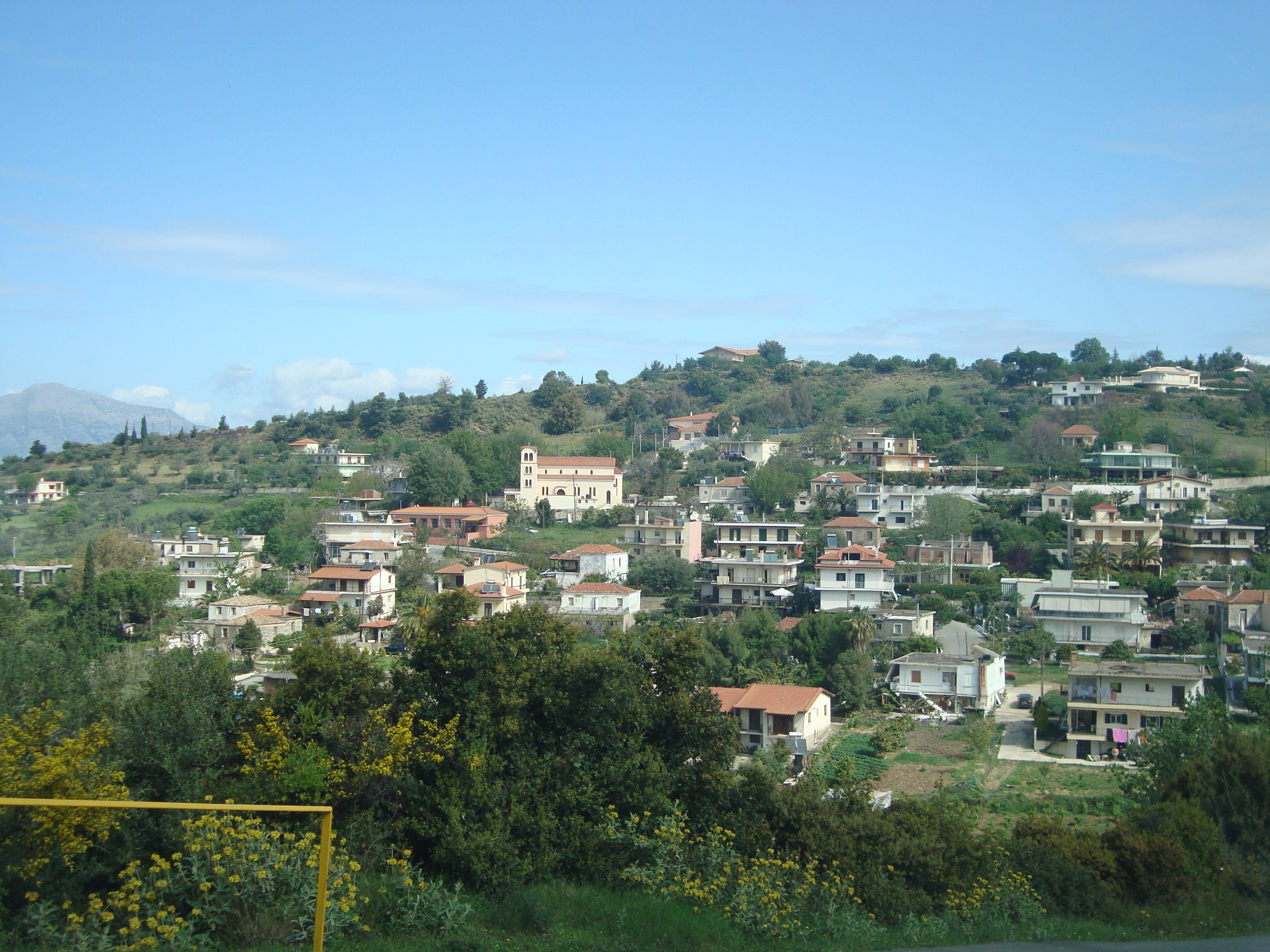
Voudeni (Skioessa)

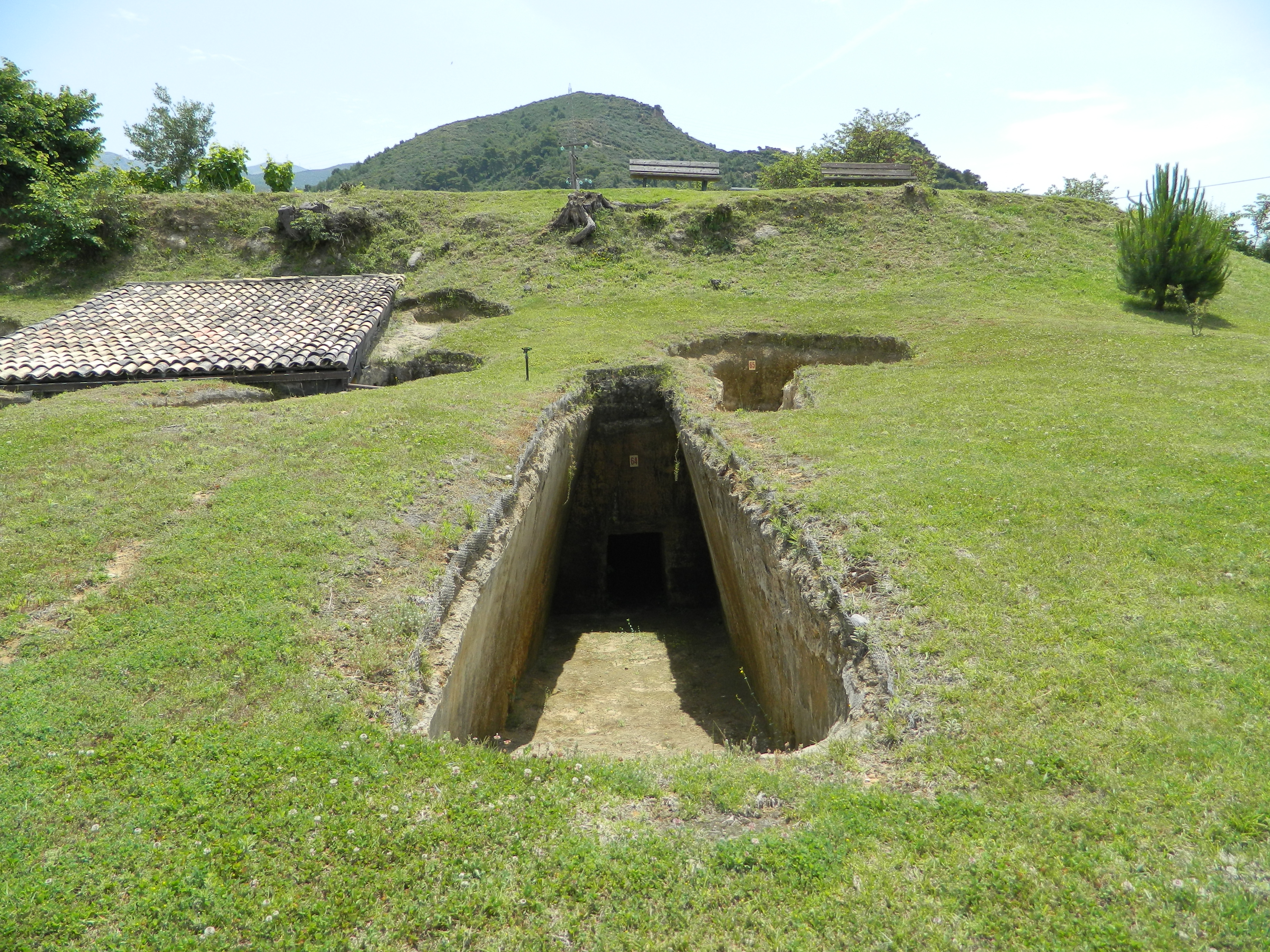
The Mycenaean cemetery of Voudeni

== Nearest places ==
- Charadros, north and northeast
- Patras, south and west

== Population ==
Historical population
Year	Pop.	±%
1991	536	—
2001	528	−1.5%
2011	626	+18.6%
2021	529	−15.5%

== Geography ==
Skioessa lies in the hills east of Patras, near the river Meilichos. The village is located 5 km from downtown Patras and about 5 km southeast of Rio. The Patras bypass, part of the A5 motorway, passes west of the village.

== See also ==
- List of settlements in Achaea
