= Carl Holmberg =

Swedish gymnast (1884–1909)

- Full name: Carl Johan Severin Holmberg
- Born: 9 March 1884 Malmö, United Kingdoms of Sweden and Norway
- Died: 1 December 1909 (aged 25) Malmö, Sweden
- Relatives: Arvid Holmberg (brother); Oswald Holmberg (brother)

Gymnastics career
- Discipline: Men's artistic gymnastics
- Country represented: Sweden
- Club: Stockholms Gymnastikförening
Medal record
Men's artistic gymnastics
Representing Sweden
Olympic Games
Gold medal – first place	1908 London	Team

Carl Johan Severin Holmberg (9 March 1884 – 1 December 1909) was a Swedish gymnast who competed in the 1908 Summer Olympics. He was part of the Swedish team, which was able to win the gold medal in the gymnastics men's team event in 1908.
