= Eduard Ladislas Kaunitz, baron von Holmberg =

Austrian military officer

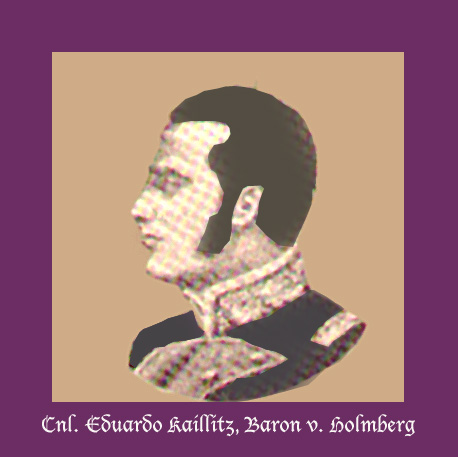
Eduard l. Kaunitz, baron von Holmberg

Eduard Ladislas Kaunitz, baron von Holmberg (1778–1853) was an Austrian military officer, who joined the Argentine revolutionary forces after serving alongside José de San Martín and Carlos María de Alvear during the Argentine War of Independence.

He was appointed to the Army of the North under Manuel Belgrano as commander of artillery, and later founded the first sapper corps in the Argentine Army (1813).

Son of Eduard Kaunitz and Amalia O'Donell, Holmberg studied in military academy in Prussia between 1794 and 1795. He served during the Napoleonic Wars with the Duchy of Berg and later on fought in Spain where he met and established a relationship with the future Argentine army officers José de San Martín, José Zapiola and Carlos María de Alvear. Around 1812 he traveled to Buenos Aires on the British frigate George Canning, which was transporting the Argentine fighters from Europe, attracted by the possibility of fighting in the South American wars of independence. He arrived on 9 March and was noted in the daily Gazeta de Buenos Ayres a few days later:

To this port had arrived, among others in the English frigate, Cavalry Lieutenant Colonel José de San Martín, First Adjutant to the General in Chief of the Army, marquis de Coupigny; Infantry Captain Francisco Vera; Sub-Lieutenant José Zapiola; Militia Captain Francisco Chilavert; Royal Carabineers Sub-Lieutenant Carlos Alvear y Balbastro; Infantry Sub-Lieutenant Antonio Arellano and Guardias Valonas First Lieutenant Eduardo Kailitz, Barón de Holmberg. These individuals came to offer their services to the government and have been welcomed with the consideration deserved for the sentiments they professed towards the interests of the motherland.

Kaunitz was an amateur botanist, and had in his luggage several collections of bulbs from floral plants unknown in Argentina. On 20 March 1812 he joined the Army of the North, with the rank of lieutenant colonel, commanding the artillery of Belgrano's army. He made excellent relations with the general, being of assistance at the battles of Las Piedras (1812) and Tucumán, but he had uneasy relations and some enmities with other army officers which made him leave this army after the last battle. He continued the campaign at the front in Montevideo, where in 1813 he would found the first sapper corps in the army. At the beginning of 1814 the government commanded him to fight and capture José Gervasio Artigas, but he fell wounded at the battle of Espinillo fighting Fernando Torgués, whom pardoned his life and released him along with his adjutant, lieutenant Hilarión de la Quintana.

Kaunitz married Antonia Balbastro, a cousin of Alvear; his son Eduardo Wenceslao also served as an officer under Juan Lavalle.

The national government gave him in 1821 the task of building forts in the south of Buenos Aires Province. In 1826 he fought in the war with Brazil under the command of his old friend from the campaigns in Spain, Alvear.

He died in 1853, a little after the birth of his first grandson, Eduardo Ladislao, who would become one of the greatest naturalists of the country.
