= Agyia =

Neighborhood of Patras, Greece

Coordinates: 38.26962°N 21.74769°E

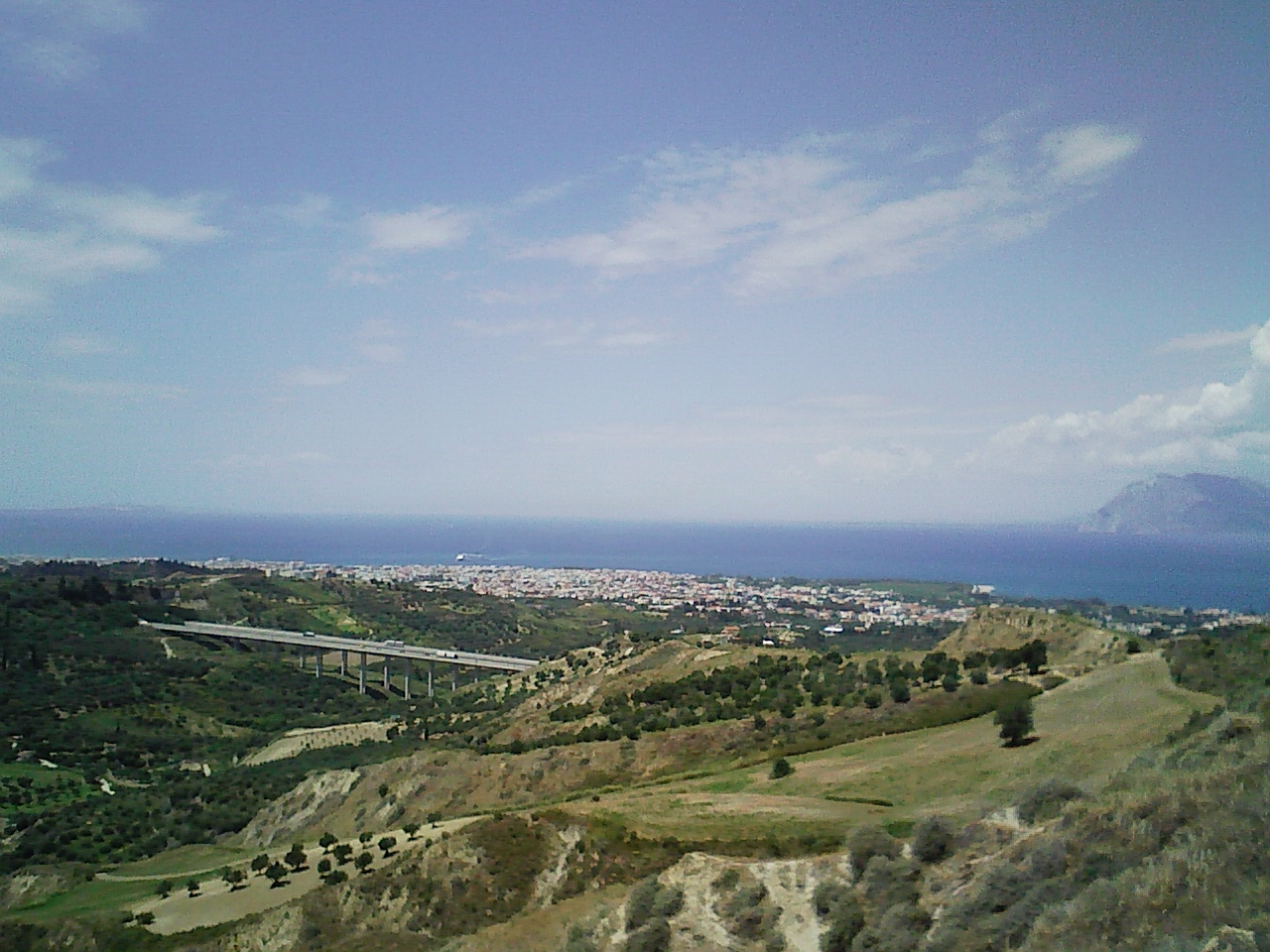
The cape, the swamp and the district of Agyia.

Agyia (Greek: Αγυιά) is a neighborhood of the city of Patras, Greece. It is located about 3.5 km north of downtown Patras. The community forms the mid-northern part of the city of Patras. Most of the street names are named after rivers. The town includes the church of St. Constantine (Aghios Konstantinos).

== History ==
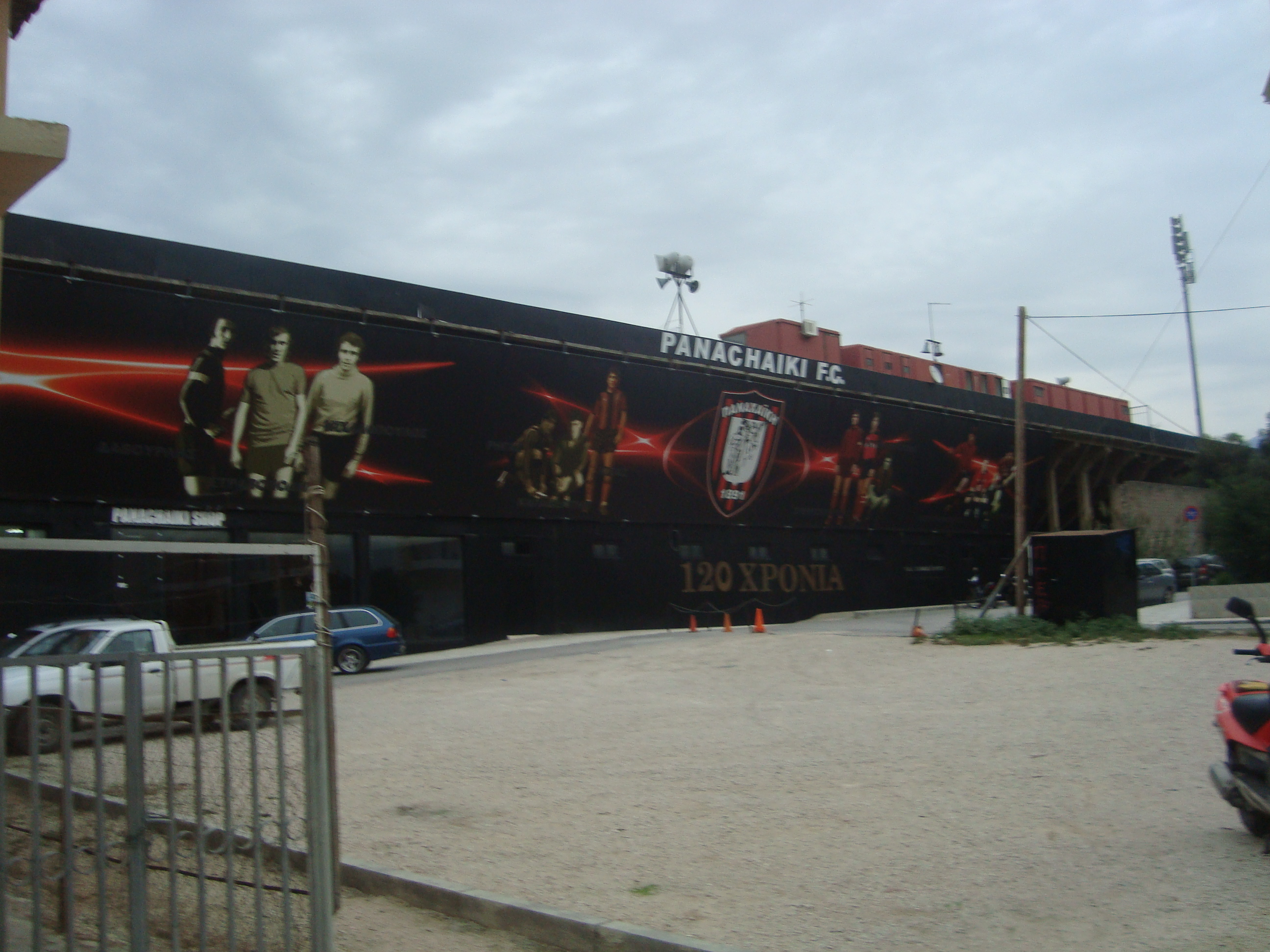
Kostas Davourlis Stadium

The community used to be a village, but Patras's expansion engulfed it during the 1970s and the 1980s. A highway bypass (2.5 km) was built in 1995, which reduced traffic.

The section of north Patras is divided into Meso (Inner) Agyias and Exo (Outer) Agyias. Its nearest subdivision (excluding Patras) are Skioessa. Agricultural lands lie to the north and urban sprawl in central and southern areas.

The main street is Leoforos Panepistimiou (University Avenue), which leads to the University Town outside Patras (near Rio). Other streets include Afstralias, Agiou Konstantinou or Agyia, Aretha, and Notara. The EOK campground is northwest of the center on Iroon Polytechneiou Street.

The Achaiki confection factory was located at the corner of Notara and Panepistimiou; it produced loukoumia (Turkish delight), vanilla sweets, and koufeta (Jordan almonds). The business was established in 1925 by Vassilios Manoussos (1900–1985) and was continued by his son, Konstantinos (1929–1997). Within the grounds of the old factory and by the Agyia creek, is a large maple tree, over 300 years old, a local landmark. About 500 metres north of the maple tree, an ancient Roman bridge (excavated in 1984) was discovered. It is said that Saint Paul and Saint Andrews (the city of Patra's patron saint) both walked on this bridge.

== Transport ==
Agyia is served by a railway stop of the same name on the Patras Suburban Railway. The EO8 and EO8a road corridor passes the neighbourhood to the east, with the EO8a leading to the A5 and A8 motorways.

== Sporting teams ==
There are two football clubs, Agyia AU and Panionios Achilleas Agyia both playing in the fourth division of the EPS Achaia. Kostas Davourlis Stadium of Panachaiki is located also in the area.

== Residents ==
- Kostas Davourlis, football player

== See also ==
- Patras
