= Arvid Holmberg =

Swedish artistic gymnast (1886–1958)

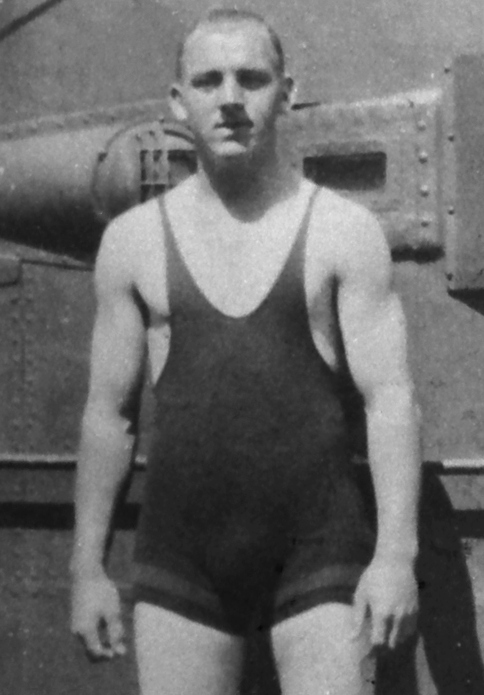
- Holmberg in a singlet

Personal information
- Full name: Nils Arvid Birger Holmberg
- Born: 10 October 1886 Malmö, United Kingdoms of Sweden and Norway
- Died: 11 September 1958 (aged 71) Malmö, Sweden
- Relatives: Carl Holmberg (brother); Oswald Holmberg (brother)

Gymnastics career
- Discipline: Men's artistic gymnastics
- Country represented: Sweden
- Club: Malmö Gymnastik- och Fäktklubb
Medal record
Men's artistic gymnastics
Representing Sweden
Olympic Games
Gold medal – first place	1908 London	Team

Nils Arvid Birger Holmberg (10 October 1886 – 11 September 1958) was a Swedish gymnast. He was part of the Swedish team that won the all-around title at the 1908 Summer Olympics. The team included his brothers Carl and Oswald.
