= Eduardo Ladislao Holmberg =

Argentine natural historian and novelist

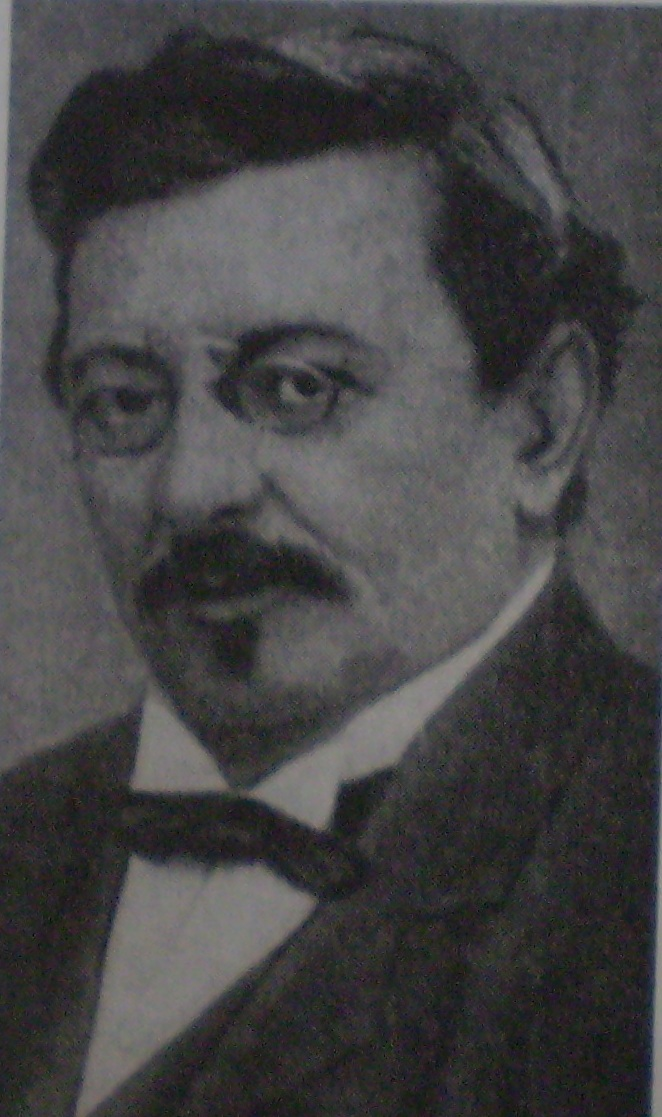
- Born: 27 July 1852; Buenos Aires, Argentina
- Died: 4 November 1937 (aged 85)
- Occupations: natural historian and novelist
- Known for: undertook the inventory of Argentine flora and fauna, director of the Buenos Aires Zoo
- Notable work: helped introduce the cultivation of the camellia to Argentina
- Father: Eduardo Wenceslao Holmberg

Eduardo Ladislao Holmberg (27 July 1852, in Buenos Aires – 4 November 1937) was an Argentine natural historian and novelist, one of the leading figures in Argentine biology. Together with Florentino Ameghino he undertook the inventory of Argentine flora and fauna, and explored all the ecoregions in the country, summarizing for the first time the biodiversity of its territory. The son of botanical aficionado Eduardo Wenceslao Holmberg and grandson of the Baron Holmberg, Holmburg accompanied Argentine Libertador Manuel Belgrano on his campaigns and introduced the cultivation of the camellia to Argentina. As director of the Buenos Aires Zoological Garden he greatly developed its scientific aspect, publishing booklets and providing printed media for a learned appreciation of its contents. He also directed the Natural History Cabinet of the University of Buenos Aires and published the standard reference works on botany and zoology used in his country for most of the 20th century.

While less distinguished for his writing, he was arguably the first science fiction writer in Latin America. He wrote the first Latin American science fiction novel, Viaje maravilloso del señor Nic-Nac al planeta Marte (Eng. The Marvellous Journey of Mr. Nic-Nac to the Planet Mars). In 1879, he wrote Horacio Kalibang o los autómatas (Eng. Horacio Kalibang or The Automatons), the first short science fiction story of Latin America.

== Early life ==
Coming from a European Bourgeois family, Holmberg had mastered English, French, and German by the time he became Faculty of Medicine of the University of Buenos Aires. He had grown up in close contact with his father's gardens and extensive literature collection, gaining a life-long interest in botany and entomology. He quickly learned Latin as well, an essential for scientific studies at the time.

He became a doctor in 1880 with a thesis on phosphene, however he never practiced the profession. Despite the low standing of natural history at the time, Holmberg had studied the science for nearly a decade at the time of his graduation, beginning with the documentation of native flora and fauna in his study Travels in Patagonia, 1872 (Es. Viajes por la Patagonia, 1872). From 1874 onward he dedicated himself to the study of arachnids, publishing several studies over the next decade and laying a foundation for the study of the arthropods in the country. That very same year he married the young Magdalena Jorge, a fashionable lady of Buenos Aires society. He was published in the Annals of Argentine Agriculture (Es. Anales de la Agricultura Argentina) and the Zoological Periodical (Es. Periódico Zoológico), two of the most important scientific publications of the era, describing species and investigation the effects of agricultural activities on the natural world.

In 1877 he completed his journey through Patagonia with an expedition to the north, during which he crossed the Chaco province, the Altiplano in the Andes and Cuyo province. The botanical and zoological descriptions he collected on this trip were reviewed and published in the Board of Education Bulletin (Boletín del Consejo de Educación), and then led studies published through the National Academy of Sciences of Argentina, the Annals of the Argentine Scientific Society and the Argentine Geographic Society magazine, as well as the book Mammals and Birds of Salta.

In 1878, along with the entomologist Enrique Lynch Arribálzaga, Holmberg founded the first magazine dedicated exclusively to biology in Argentina, The Argentine Naturalist. Only one issue was published, but the quality of the material caused numerous scientific institutions around the world, including the British Museum, to request copies. The magazine would then be translated through an important collaboration with the American Journal of Natural History, founded in 1891 by Florentino Ameghino.

== Research and teachings ==
Holmberg abandoned the study of spiders relatively early, but he enthusiastically approached the exploration of the diversity of Argentine biology. From 1881 onwards he would systematically explore all the biomes of the country, collecting the results of his research in the monumental Scientific Results, especially those zoological and botanical of the three journeys carried out in 1881, 1882, and 1883 to the Tandil Mountain Range (Es. Resultados científicos, especialmente zoológicos y botánicos de los tres viajes llevados a cabo en 1881, 1882 y 1883 a la sierra de Tandil). The exploration of Chaco also included Ameghino, leading to the ignition of a long and fruitful collaboration between the two. Holmberg made several new scientific expeditions to the Tandil mountain range (1883), to Chaco (1885), to Misiones, (1897), and to Mendoza.

=== The Buenos Aires Zoo ===
In 1888 he was appointed director of the Buenos Aires Zoo, which he boosted greatly, in terms of both collection and infrastructure. Founded during the administration of President Domingo Faustino Sarmiento, the Zoo did not even have a definitive plan. Holmberg appointed a commission to this effect, composed of Florentino Ameghino, Carlos Berg and Lynch Arribálzaga, to which the current layout is due almost in its entirety. He would occupy the position of director until 1904, when he distanced himself from the organization after a disagreement with the municipal authorities.

The grounds of the Zoo were a swampy shoal, divided by the tracks of the Northern Railroad and partly occupied by a shooting club. Holmberg had complete freedom for the redesign, which entailed the redirection and removal of the railway, the filling of the swamp, the layout of the paths and the construction of the pavilions; His idea was to design them according to the architecture of each region of origin, creating fantastic buildings of great architectural value. The largest of these pavilions had not yet been completed when he stopped working at the zoo. This was the Hindu temple destined to house the elephants, replica of a Hindu temple in Bombay designed by Vicente Cestari.

With the idea of forming a diverse source of zoological training, Holmberg acquired European, African and Asian species to complement the rich fauna of the interior of the country. He also implemented changes in the treatment and feeding of wild animals, improved their visibility to the public, and encouraged the role of scientific dissemination of the zoological garden before the purely recreational.

== Honours ==
In 1909, botanist Cristóbal Mariá Hicken (1875-1933), named a genus of flowering plants from southern South America, (belonging to the family Amaranthaceae) in his honour Holmbergia

== Bibliography ==
- Bruno, Paula, Pioneros culturales de la Argentina. Biografías de una época, 1860-1910, Buenos Aires, Siglo XXI Editores, 2011.
- Holmberg E. L. (1881) "Aracnidos". pages 117-168. In: Roca J. A. (ed.), Döring A., Berg C., Holmberg E. L. (1881) Informe oficial de la Co (Patagonia) realizada en los meses de Abril, Mayo y Junio de 1879, bajo. Buenos Aires. 168 pp. + 4 plates. (scan).
- Holmberg E. L. (1909). "Mollusca Geophila Argentina Nova". Apuntes Historia Natural Buenos Aires 1: 19–12.
- Holmberg E. L. (1909). "Mollusca Argentina Varia". Apuntes Historia Natural Buenos Aires 1: 691–92.
- Holmberg E. L. (1912). "Moluscos Argentinos en parte nuevos, coleccionados por Franco Pastore". Physis 1: 20–22.

== See also ==
- Category:Taxa named by Eduardo Ladislao Holmberg
