= Anton Gustafsson (athlete) =

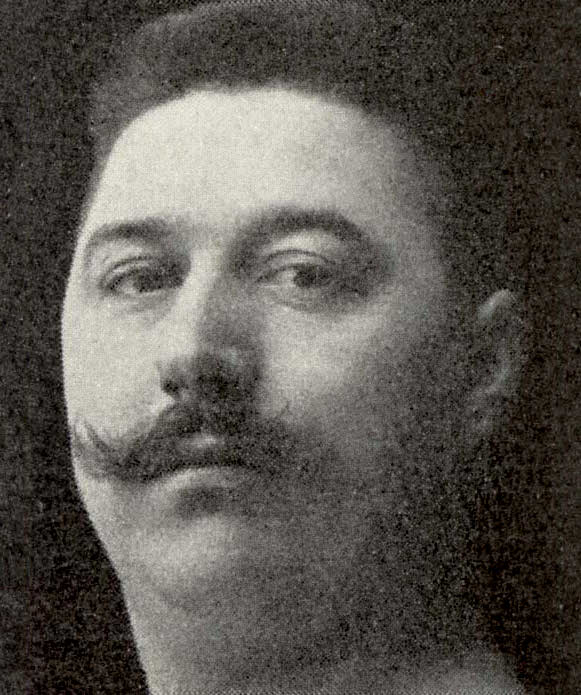

Personal information
- Born: 6 February 1877 Stockholm, Sweden
- Died: 16 November 1943 (aged 66)

Sport
- Sport: Tug of war
- Club: IK Atle, Stockholm
Medal record
Representing Sweden
1906 Intercalated Games
Bronze medal – third place	1906 Athens	Team

Johan Gustaf Anton Gustafsson (6 February 1877 – 16 November 1943) was a Swedish athlete who won a bronze medal in the tug of war competition at the 1906 Intercalated Games. Gustafsson was a Swedish weightlifting champion in 1905–1907, and it is unclear why he did not compete in weightlifting at the 1906 Games.
