= Hjalmar Mellander =

Swedish track and field athlete (1880–1919)

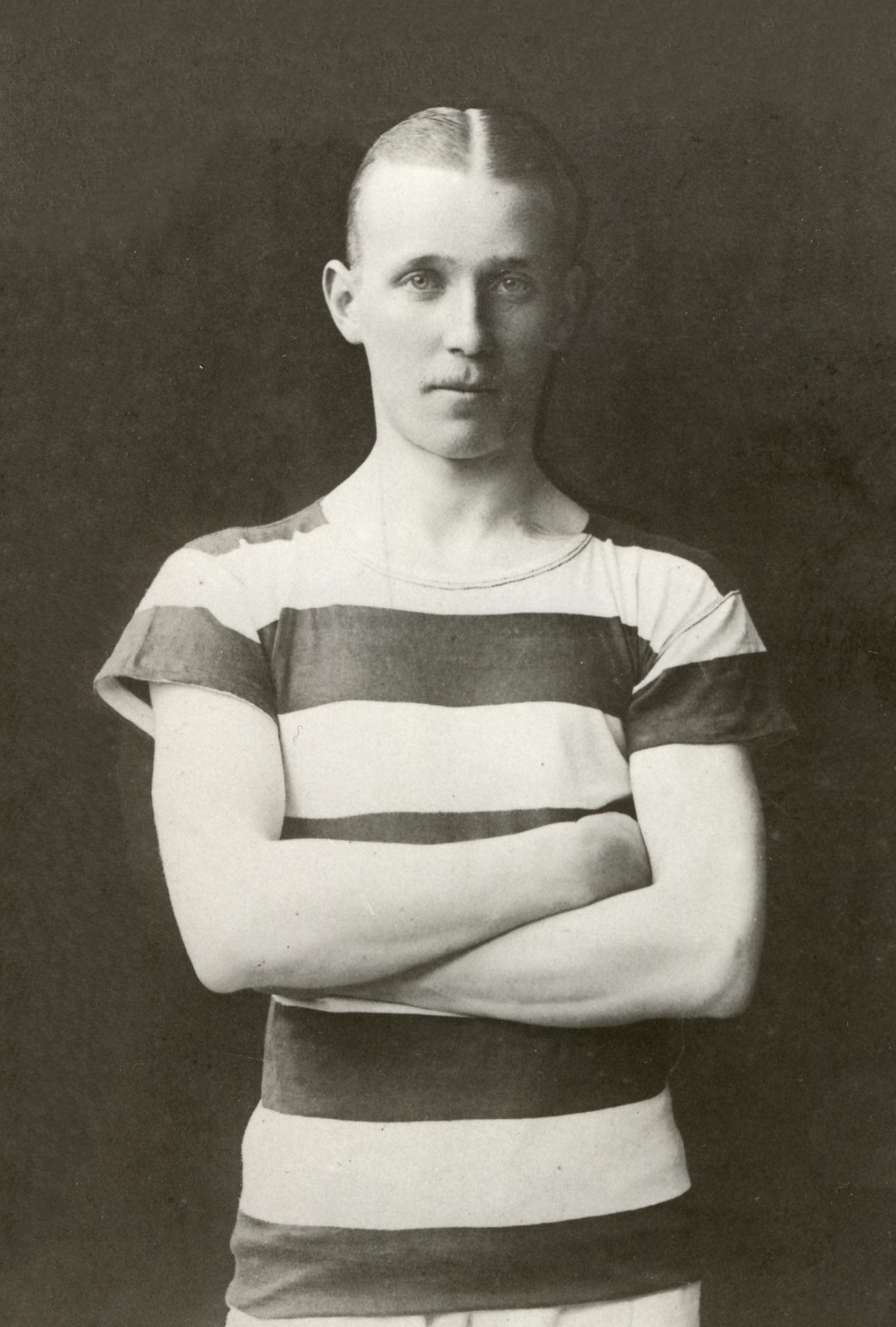

Personal information
- Born: 14 December 1880 Årstad, Sweden
- Died: 3 October 1919 (aged 38) Isle of Man, Great Britain
- Height: 183 cm (6 ft 0 in)
- Weight: 80 kg (176 lb)

Sport
- Sport: Athletics
- Event: Decathlon
- Club: IFK Halmstad

Achievements and titles
- Personal bests: 200 m – 24.2 (1904); 800 m – 2.04.8 (1905); 1500 m – 4:12.9 (1906); LJ – 6.68 m (1904); DT – 34.30 m (1900); HT – 34.50 m (1906); JT – 44.30 m (1906)
Medal record
Representing Sweden
Intercalated Games
Gold medal – first place	1906 Athens	Pentathlon

Hjalmar Stefanus Mellander (14 December 1880 – 3 October 1919) was a Swedish track and field athlete. He competed in the 800 m, long jump, javelin throw and ancient pentathlon at the 1906 Intercalated Games.

== Biography ==
Mellander finished runner-up behind Peter O'Connor at the 1904 AAA Championships and third in the 1905 AAA Championships.

At the 1906 Intercalated Games (Olympic Games), he finished fourth in the long jump and javelin throw. He won the pentathlon event, which consisted of standing long jump, Greek-style discus throw, javelin throw, 192 m sprint and Greco-Roman wrestling.

Mellander was a physiotherapist who practiced in Liverpool since 1902. In 1919 he died while trying to rescue a drowning man on the Isle of Man.
