= Nils Granfelt =

Swedish gymnast

- Full name: Nils Daniel Granfelt
- Born: 17 February 1887 Stockholm, United Kingdoms of Sweden and Norway
- Died: 21 July 1959 (aged 72) Nacka, Sweden
- Relatives: Erik Granfelt (brother); Hans Granfelt (brother); Nils Rydström (nephew)

Gymnastics career
- Discipline: Men's artistic gymnastics
- Country represented: Sweden
- Club: Stockholms Gymnastikförening
Medal record
Men's artistic gymnastics
Representing Sweden
Olympic Games
Gold medal – first place	1912 Stockholm	Team, Swedish system

Nils Daniel Granfelt (February 17, 1887 – July 21, 1959) was a Swedish gymnast who competed in the 1912 Summer Olympics. He was part of the Swedish team, which won the gold medal in the gymnastics men's team, Swedish system event.
