= Panachaiki G.E. =

Multisports club in Greece

- Full name: Panachaiki Gymnastiki Enosi (Panachaean Gymnastic Union)
- Nicknames: Megali Kyria tis Peloponnisou (Great Lady of the Peloponnese)
- Founded: 14 June 1891; 134 years ago (as Panachaikos Gymnastikos Syllogos)
- Colours
- Anthem: Panachaiki (Kostas Albanis)
- President: Panagiotis Semitekolos
- Titles: 13

Panachaiki Gymnastiki Enosi (Greek: Παναχαϊκή Γυμναστική Ένωση, lit. 'Panachaean Gymnastic Union') is a Greek multisports club based in Patras, Greece.

The history of Panachaiki G.E. began on 14 June 1891, when Panachaikos Gymnastikos Syllogos (Greek: Παναχαϊκός Γυμναστικός Σύλλογος, lit. 'Panachaean Gymnastic Club') was founded. In 1894, a rival sports club, Gymnastiki Etaireia Patron (Greek: Γυμναστική Εταιρεία Πατρών, lit. 'Patras Gymnastic Company'), was founded in Patras by former Panachaikos' members. It was only in 1923 that the two clubs agreed to merge, forming Panachaiki Gymnastiki Enosi.

Throughout a history of over 120 years, Panachaiki's athletes have won several Olympic medals. Emblematic figures in Panachaiki's history are weightlifter Dimitrios Tofalos and Kostas Davourlis, leader of the great football team that impressed Greece in the 1970s and took part in the 1973–74 UEFA Cup, being the first Greek countryside football club (outside Athens and Thessaloniki) to achieve that distinction.

== Departments ==
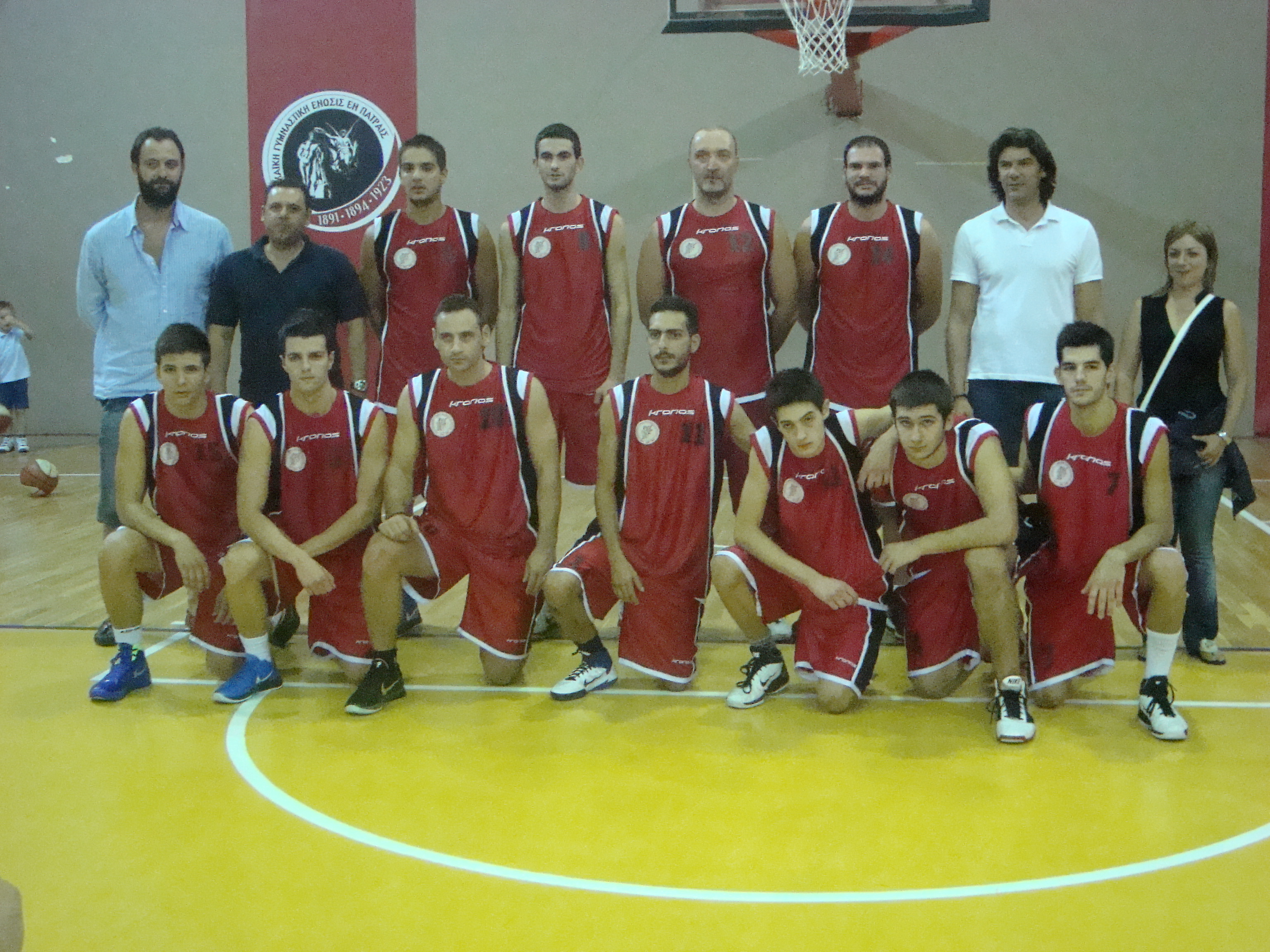
Basketball team, 2011

- Football
- Volleyball
- Basketball
- Athletics
- Boxing

== Titles ==
=== Panachaiki Football ===
(Honours: 1 titles)

- Opap championship: (1): 1972

=== Panachaiki athletics ===
(Honours: 3 titles)

- Greek Cross Country Championship, Men: (2): 1981, 1982
- Greek Cross Country Championship, Women: (1): 1959

=== Panachaiki boxing ===
(Honours: 7 titles)

- Greek Championship, Men: (4): 2008, 2009, 2012, 2013
- Greek Championship, Women: (3): 2018, 2019, 2022

=== Panachaiki beach volley ===
(Honours: 2 titles)

- Greek Championship, Men: (2) : 2010, 2011

== Panachaiki G.E. Greek Olympic medalists ==
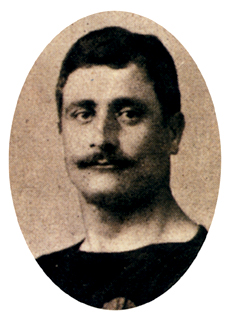
Stephanos Christopoulos

- (Greece) Nikolaos Andriakopoulos
- (Greece) Antonios Pepanos
- (Greece) Pantelis Karasevdas
- (Greece) Stephanos Christopoulos
- (Greece) Dimitrios Tofalos
- (Greece) Themistoklis Diakidis
- (Greece) Konstantinos Kozanitas
- (Greece) Georgios Psachos
- (Greece) Vassilios Psachos
- (Greece) Konstantinos Lazaros

== Notable supporters ==
- Nikolaos Andriakopoulos, Olympic athlete, Gold medalist n 1896 Olympics
- Alekos Chrysanthakopoulos, politician with PASOK and LAOS
- Stephanos Christopoulos, Roman-Greek fighter, former Panachaiki athlete, Bronze medalist in 1896 Olympics
- Vivian Ioakeim, model, former Panachaiki athlete
- Dimitris Katsikopoulos, politician with PASOK
- Christos Karyllos, politician, former club president
- Kostis Stefanopoulos, former President of Hellenic Republic
- Dimitrios Tofalos, weightlifter, former Panachaiki athlete, world record holder (1904-1914)

== Sources ==
- Polites, N.G. (1994). Sports in Patras, Tome A, The first decade 1891-1900. Patras: Achaikes Ekdoseis. ISBN 960-7164-91-1.
- Polites, N.G. (1997). Sports in Patras, Tome B, From the Tofalos period to the foundation of Panachaiki. Patras: Achaikes Ekdoseis. ISBN 960-7164-92-X.
- Municipality of Patras, 100 years of football in Patras, 2006
- Kokkovikas, K., The sports past of Achaia, 2004
