= George Granfelt =

Finnish lawyer and politician

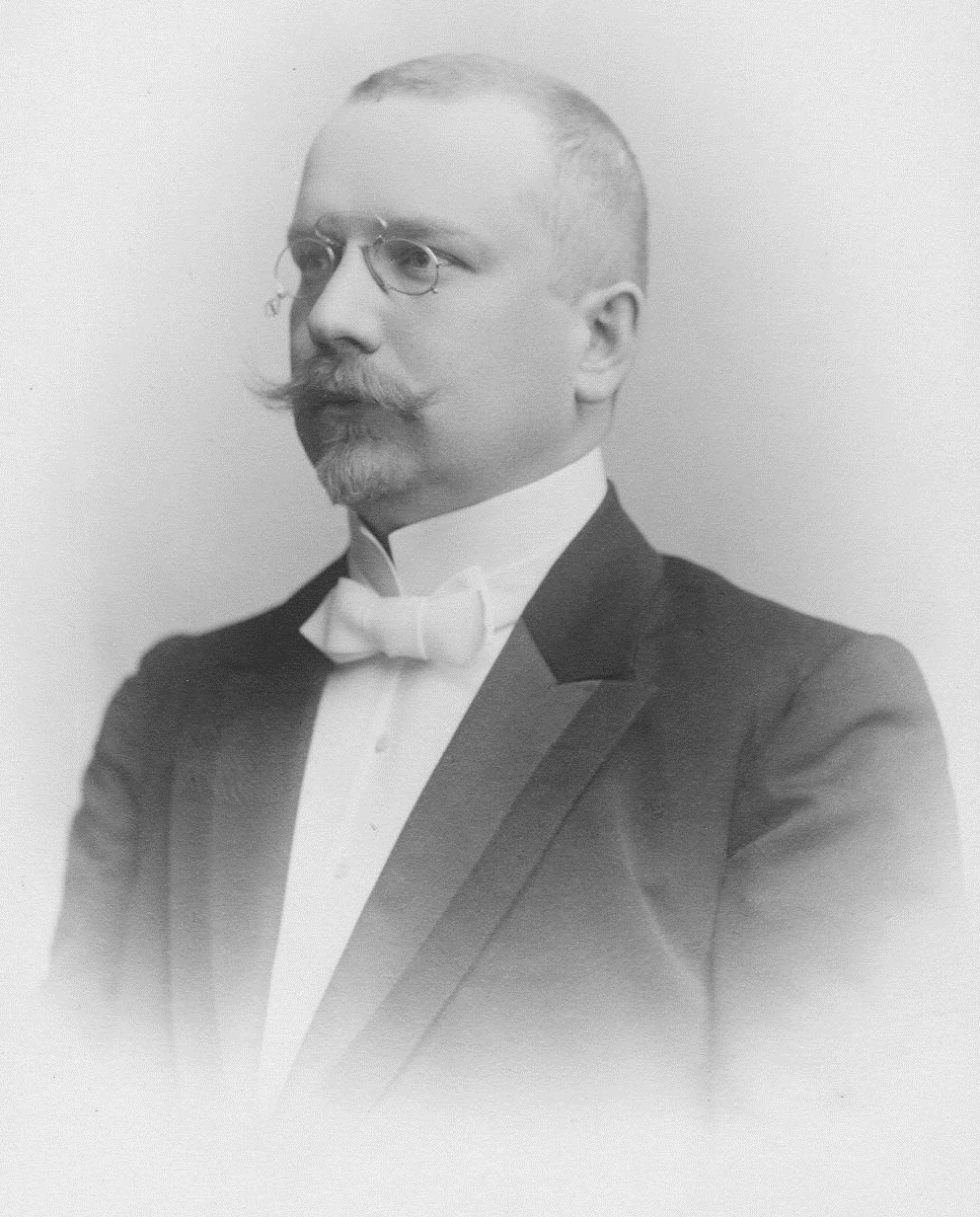
George Granfelt

Georg (George) Fredrik Granfelt (19 June 1865, in Turku – 5 August 1917, in Naantali) was a Finnish lawyer and politician. He was a member of the Diet of Finland from 1891 to 1906 and of the Parliament of Finland from 1908 to 1909, from 1910 to 1911, and from 1912 to 1913.

== Publications ==
- Västfinska afdelningens historia (1890)
- Dikter (1892)
- Finlands städers vapenbok (1892)
- Om kontokuranten (1899)
- Om försäkringsaftalets uppkomst och utveckling (1908)
- Om sjöförsäkring (1908)
- Den finska växelrättens grunddrag (1916)
- Finlands växelrätt i sammandrag (1926)
