= Hans Granfelt =

Swedish fencer and discus thrower

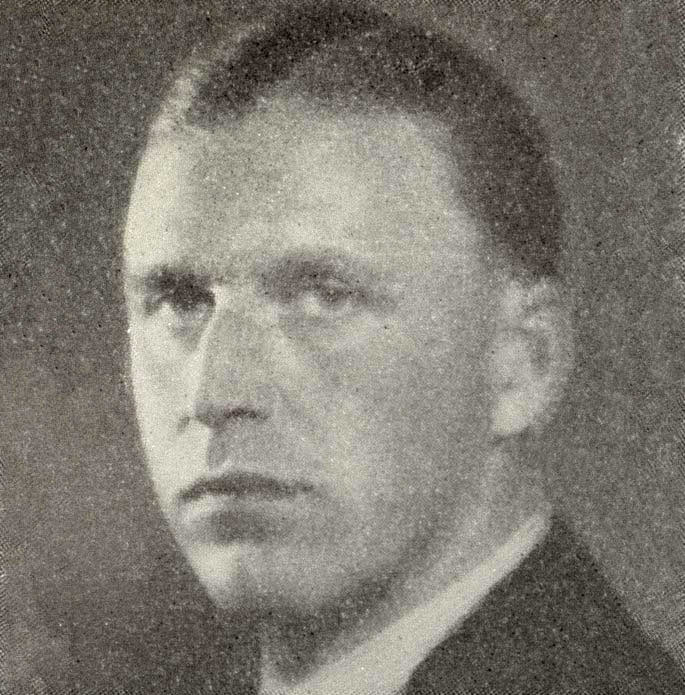

Personal information
- Born: 26 October 1897 Stockholm, Sweden
- Died: 5 September 1963 (aged 65) Stockholm, Sweden

Sport
- Sport: Discus throw, fencing
- Club: IFK Stockholm; FFF, Stockholm
Medal record
Representing Sweden
Olympic Games
Silver medal – second place	1936 Berlin	Épée, team

Hans Granfelt (26 October 1897 – 5 September 1963) was a Swedish fencer and discus thrower. At the 1920 Summer Olympics he competed in the discus throw and served as the Swedish flag bearer. At 1936, Summer Olympics he competed in the individual and team épée and won a team silver medal. His brothers Nils and Erik were Olympic gymnasts, and his nephew Nils Rydström became an Olympic fencer.
