= Zarouchleika =

Coordinates: 38°13′N 21°44′E

Zarouchleika or Zarouchlaiika (Greek: Ζαρουχλέικα or Ζαρουχλαίικα), official name Glafkos, is a large suburb with a population of approximately 50,000 residents, located about 3 km south from the city centre of Patras, Greece. The main streets of Zarouchleika are the coastal road Akti Dymaion and Antheias Street. The OSE's railway from Patras to Pyrgos passes west of Zarouchleika.

== History ==
The first inhabitants of the area were families that came from Zarouchla near Akrata, hence the name. It became an independent community in 1912. It was renamed to Glafkos (after the river Glafkos) in 1928, and in 1961, it became part of the metropolitan city of Patras.
