= Oswald Holmberg =

Swedish gymnast

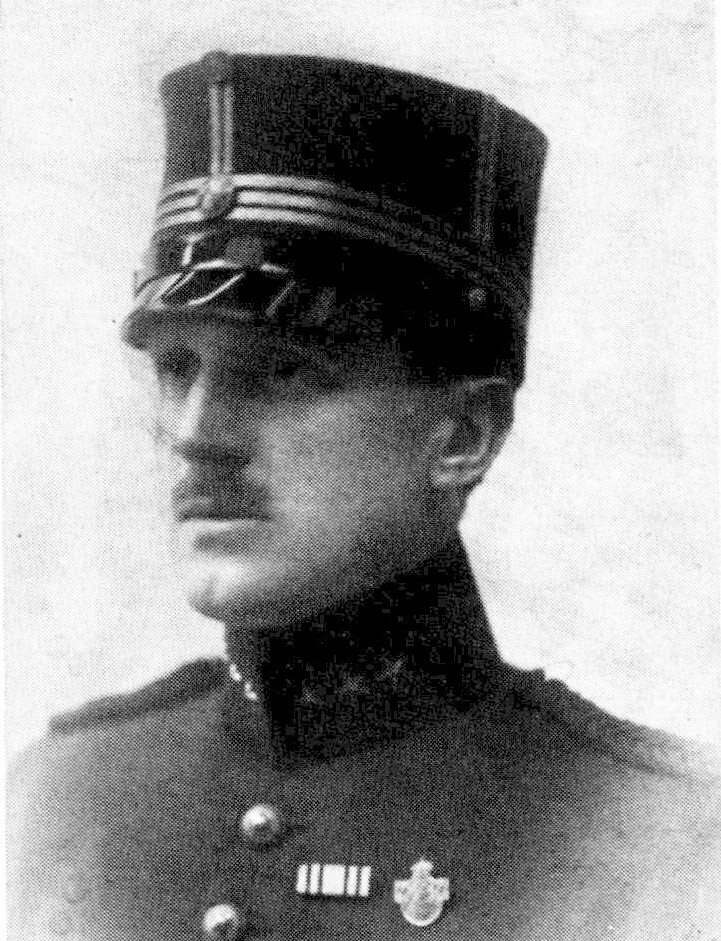
- Holmberg in military attire

Personal information
- Full name: Torsten Oswald Magnus Holmberg
- Born: 17 July 1882 Malmö, United Kingdoms of Sweden and Norway
- Died: 11 February 1969 (aged 86) Malmö, Sweden
- Relatives: Arvid Holmberg (brother); Carl Holmberg (brother)

Gymnastics career
- Discipline: Men's artistic gymnastics
- Country represented: Sweden
- Club: Stockholms Gymnastikförening
Medal record
Representing Sweden
Men's artistic gymnastics
Olympic Games
Gold medal – first place	1908 London	Team
Gold medal – first place	1912 Stockholm	Team, Swedish system
Men's tug of war
Intercalated Games
Bronze medal – third place	1906 Athens	Tug of war

Torsten Oswald Magnus Holmberg (17 July 1882 – 11 February 1969) was a Swedish gymnast and tug of war competitor who participated in the 1908 Summer Olympics and in the 1912 Summer Olympics.

He was part of the Swedish team, which was able to win the gold medal in the gymnastics men's team event in 1908. In the 1912 Summer Olympics, he won his second gold medal as a member of the Swedish gymnastics team in the Swedish system event.

At the 1906 Intercalated Games in Athens, he was a member of the Swedish tug of war team, which won the bronze medal.
