= Erik Granfelt =

Swedish artistic gymnast

- Full name: Erik Gustaf Granfelt
- Born: 17 November 1883 Stockholm, United Kingdoms of Sweden and Norway
- Died: 18 February 1962 (aged 78) Täby, Sweden
- Relatives: Hans Granfelt (brother); Nils Granfelt (brother); Nils Rydström (nephew)

Gymnastics career
- Discipline: Men's artistic gymnastics
- Country represented: Sweden
- Club: Stockholms Gymnastikförening
Medal record
Representing Sweden
Men's artistic gymnastics
Olympic Games
Gold medal – first place	1908 London	Team
Men's tug of war
Intercalated Games
Bronze medal – third place	1906 Athens	Tug of war

Erik Gustaf Granfelt (17 November 1883 – 18 February 1962) was a Swedish gymnast who competed at the 1908 Summer Olympics. He was part of the Swedish team, which was able to win the gold medal in the gymnastics men's team event in 1908.

At the 1906 Intercalated Games in Athens, he was a member of the Swedish tug of war team, which won the bronze medal. see Tug of war 1906.

Erik Granfelt also played football (soccer) for AIK from Stockholm, with whom he won the Swedish Championship in 1901.
