= Hungary at the 1906 Intercalated Games =

Hungary at the Olympics

- IOC code: HUN
- NOC: Hungarian Olympic Committee

in Athens
- Competitors: 35 in 7 sports
- Medals Ranked 8th: Gold 2 Silver 5 Bronze 3 Total 10

Summer appearances
- 1896; 1900; 1904; 1908; 1912; 1920; 1924; 1928; 1932; 1936; 1948; 1952; 1956; 1960; 1964; 1968; 1972; 1976; 1980; 1984; 1988; 1992; 1996; 2000; 2004; 2008; 2012; 2016; 2020; 2024; 2028

Winter appearances
- 1924; 1928; 1932; 1936; 1948; 1952; 1956; 1960; 1964; 1968; 1972; 1976; 1980; 1984; 1988; 1992; 1994; 1998; 2002; 2006; 2010; 2014; 2018; 2022; 2026

Hungary competed at the 1906 Intercalated Games in Athens, Greece. 35 athletes, all men, competed in 41 events in 7 sports.

== Athletics ==
Track

Athlete	Events	Heat		Semifinals		Final	
Athlete	Events	Result	Rank	Result	Rank	Result	Rank
Miksa Hellmich	100 metres	Unknown	Unknown	Did not advance			
Nándor Kovács	110 metres hurdles	Unknown	Unknown	Did not advance			
Pál Vargha	110 metres hurdles	Unknown	Unknown	Did not advance			
György Sztantics	1500 metre walk	n/a				Unknown	7
György Sztantics	3000 metre walk	n/a				15:13.2	1st place, gold medalist(s)

Field

Athlete	Events	Final	
Athlete	Events	Result	Rank
Lajos Gönczy	High jump	1.750	2nd place, silver medalist(s)
Géza Szegedy	High jump	Unknown	Unknown
István Somodi	High jump	Unknown	Unknown
Pál Vargha	High jump	Unknown	Unknown
Lajos Gönczy	Standing high jump	1.350	5
Géza Szegedy	Standing high jump	1.125	9
Imre Kiss	Pole Vault	3.000	5
István Somodi	Long Jump	6.045	8
Pál Vargha	Long Jump	5.970	10
István Somodi	Standing long Jump	2.860	6
István Mudin	Standing long Jump	2.750	15
Mihály Dávid	Shot put	11.830	2nd place, silver medalist(s)
István Mudin	Shot put	Unknown	Unknown
Mihály Dávid	Stone throw	Unknown	Unknown
Gyula Strausz	Discus throw	Unknown	Unknown
György Luntzer	Discus throw	Unknown	Unknown
Mihály Dávid	Discus throw	Unknown	Unknown
István Mudin	Discus throw	Unknown	Unknown
István Mudin	Discus throw (Greek style)	31.910	3rd place, bronze medalist(s)
György Luntzer	Discus throw (Greek style)	30.260	5
Mihály Dávid	Discus throw (Greek style)	Unknown	Unknown
Gyula Strausz	Discus throw (Greek style)	Unknown	Unknown
Pál Vargha	Javelin Throw, freestyle	38.750	11
Mihály Dávid	Javelin Throw, freestyle	Unknown	Unknown
István Mudin	Javelin Throw, freestyle	Unknown	Unknown
György Luntzer	Javelin Throw, freestyle	Unknown	Unknown
Gyula Strausz	Javelin Throw, freestyle	Unknown	Unknown
István Mudin	Pentathlon (Ancient)	25 points	2nd place, silver medalist(s)
György Luntzer	Pentathlon (Ancient)	34 points	10
Pál Vargha	Pentathlon (Ancient)	56 points	22

== Fencing ==
Athlete	Events	Heat Group	Semifinal Group	Final Group
Athlete	Events	Rank	Rank	Rank
Lóránt Mészáros	Individual Foil	2 Q	Unknown	Did not advance
Antal Hámos	Individual Foil	2 Q	Unknown	Did not advance
Jenő Apáthy	Individual Foil	Unknown	Did not advance	
Péter Tóth	Individual Foil	Unknown	Did not advance	
Lóránt Mészáros	Individual Épée	2 Q	4	Did not advance
Péter Tóth	Individual Épée	Unknown	Did not advance	
Lóránt Mészáros	Individual Sabre	1 Q	2 Q	5
Jenő Apáthy	Individual Sabre	2 Q	3 Q	6
Péter Tóth	Individual Sabre	Unknown	Did not advance	
Bela Nagy	Individual Sabre	Unknown	Did not advance	
Péter Tóth	Individual Sabre three hits	1 Q	n/a	3rd place, bronze medalist(s)
Jenő Apáthy	Individual Sabre three hits	2 Q	n/a	5
Bela Nagy	Individual Sabre three hits	Unknown	n/a	Did not advance
Antal Hámos	Individual Sabre three hits	Unknown	n/a	Did not advance
Péter Tóth; Jenő Apáthy; Bela Nagy; Lóránt Mészáros	Sabre Team	Netherlands (NED); L	n/a	Greece (GRE); L

== Gymnastics ==
Athlete	Events	Final	
Athlete	Events	Result	Rank
Béla Erődi	Individual All-Around	110	6
Béla Dáner	Individual All-Around	100	17
Frigyes Gráf	Individual All-Around	99	18
Gyula Kakas	Individual All-Around	91	23
Vilmos Szűcs	Individual All-Around	90	24
Béla Erődi	Individual All-Around (5 events)	90	7
Béla Dáner	Individual All-Around (5 events)	82	21
Frigyes Gráf	Individual All-Around (5 events)	82	21
Árpád Erdős	Individual All-Around (5 events)	75	29
Kálmán Szabó	Individual All-Around (5 events)	74	31
Gyula Kakas	Individual All-Around (5 events)	74	31
Vilmos Szűcs	Individual All-Around (5 events)	71	35
Béla Dáner; Árpád Erdős; Béla Erődi; Frigyes Gráf; Gyula Kakas; Nándor Kovács; Kálmán Szabó; Vilmos Szűcs	All-round Team	14.45	6
Béla Erődi	Rope climb	13.8	2nd place, silver medalist(s)
Vilmos Szűcs	Rope climb	16.0	10

== Shooting ==
Athlete	Event	Target Hits	Points	Rank
Sándor Török	Free pistol, 25 metres	30	212	20
Sándor Török	Free pistol, 50 metres	28	153	28
Sándor Török	Gras Model Revolver, 20 metres	26	117	26
László Szemere	Gras Model Revolver, 20 metres	16	85	28
Sándor Török	Military Revolver, 20 metres	30	217	19
Sándor Török	Dueling Pistol Au Visé, 20 metres	28	201	12
Sándor Török	Dueling Pistol Au Commandement, 25 metres	25	104	5
László Szemere	Free Rifle any position, 300 metres	30	205	17
László Szemere	Rifle Gras Model Kneeling or Standing, 200 metres	25	128	20
László Szemere	Rifle Kneeling or Standing, 300 metres	30	171	25
Sándor Török	Trap single shot 16 metres	n/a	12	7
Sándor Török	Trap double shot 14 metres	n/a	4	9

== Swimming ==
Athlete	Events	Heat		Final	
Athlete	Events	Result	Rank	Result	Rank
Zoltán Halmay	100 metres freestyle	1:43.0	2 Q	Unknown	2nd place, silver medalist(s)
József Ónody	100 metres freestyle	Unknown	5 q	Unknown	6
Alajos Bruckner	400 metres freestyle	n/a		Unknown	4
Zoltán Tóbiás	400 metres freestyle	n/a		Unknown	Unknown
József Ónody; Henrik Hajós; Géza Kiss; Zoltán Halmay	4 x 250 metres freestyle relay	n/a		16:52.4	1st place, gold medalist(s)

== Tennis ==
Player	Event	Round One	Round Two	Quarterfinals	Semifinals	Finals	Rank
Player	Event	Opposition Score	Opposition Score	Opposition Score	Opposition Score	Opposition Score	Rank
Károly Vitus	Men's Singles	Žemla (BOH); L	did not advance				14

== Wrestling ==
Greco-Roman

Athlete	Event	Round 1	Semifinals	Final Group		
Athlete	Event	Opposition Result	Opposition Result	Opposition Result	Opposition Result	Rank
Ferenc Holubán	Lightweight	Niflot (USA); W	Wendrinsky (AUT); W	Watzl (AUT); L	Did not advance	3rd place, bronze medalist(s)
Béla Erődi	Lightweight	Halík (BOH); L	Did not advance			7
Richárd Weisz	Heavyweight	Baur (AUT); L	Did not advance			7
