= Herbert Gidney =

American high jumper

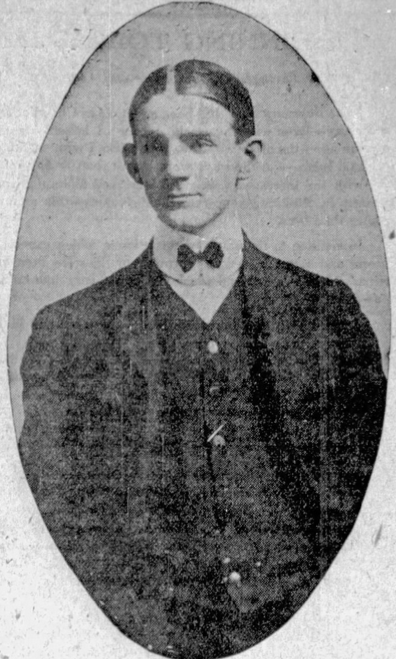

Personal information
- Born: November 16, 1881 Boston, Massachusetts, U.S.
- Died: March 26, 1963 (aged 81) Fort Lauderdale, Florida, U.S.

Sport
- Sport: Athletics
- Event: High jump
- Club: Malden YMCA (c. 1899–1906); Boston Athletic Association (c. 1904–1912)

Herbert Alfred Gidney (November 16, 1881 – March 26, 1963) was an American athlete. From Boston, Massachusetts, he was affiliated with the Boston Athletic Association and was considered among the best high jumpers in the U.S. He won the Amateur Athletic Union (AAU) national championship in 1906 and later competed in the men's high jump at the 1908 Summer Olympics.

== Early life and sports career ==
Herbert Alfred Gidney was born on November 16, 1881, in Boston, Massachusetts. He attended Malden High School.

At Malden, Gidney played baseball and "had a good record." Afterwards, he began playing several sports for the local Malden YMCA team, having joined them by at least 1899. He participated in basketball (at center), being described as the best player they ever had, in athletics, and in baseball. He set many local records, including by 1905 the area pole vault and running high dive marks. Gidney set, what was at the time, the national YMCA record in the running high jump, with a jump of 6 feet, 1 3/4 inches. He later set two more national records. He competed with Malden until 1906.

Gidney joined the Boston Athletic Association (BAA) in the early 1900s and won the BAA athletic tournament in 1904. By 1905, he had won the pole vault and running high jump championships of New England. He continued to win the New England championships every year through at least 1910.

By 1906, he had come to be regarded as among the best high jumpers nationally, having won that year's Amateur Athletic Union (AAU) indoor championship. He placed second in the AAU outdoor championship, repeated in 1907, and placed third the following year. Gidney broke the BAA high jump record in 1908.

Gidney was selected to represent the United States at the 1908 Summer Olympics in London in the men's high jump event. At first, he placed third in his heat and was eliminated, losing to Otto Monsen of Norway and Edward Leader of England. Afterwards, he complained about the conditions of where he jumped. As a report in the Warren Evening Mirror said, "H. A. Gidney was defeated by Monson of Norway and Leader of England, but after the other sections had concluded a protest was entered on the ground that the spot where the other sections were contended were more favorable than the first section." His protest was upheld and he was allowed to jump again, and won the heat. However, in the finals he was only able to reach fifth place.

In 1909, Gidney competed at the Canadian national championships and won two events. He retired in 1912 from athletics. Gidney had collected over 250 trophies from tournaments won by that time.

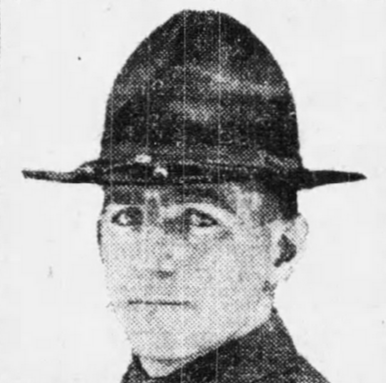
Gidney, c. 1918

An article from the Montpelier Morning Journal described him as follows:

Few, if any, athletes in New England have ever won more championships than Herbert A. Gidney ... Certain it is that no track or field man ever lifted himself into such widespread popularity or given such repeated evidences of his worth on many field of competition, both here and abroad ... He has repeatedly conceded liberal handicaps in his favorite event, and his consistent worth is readily seen from the fact that he has won more prizes from scratch than any athlete in New England, with the probable exception of Bill Coe. Over 250 trophies of his prowess adorn his home, prizes representing victories over athletes of the highest calibre in this and other lands. He is the type of athlete whose temperament is such that to know him is but to regard him personally as well as for his athletic talents. Never ostentatious, modest in speech as well, his friends are numbered in legions, while his ability is recognized wherever athletics hold sway. His reputation will live long after he has forsaken the jumping path, for Herbert Gidney, has come to be regarded by all as a gentleman, an athlete, a champion.

== Later life ==
During the later stages of his athletic career, Gidney worked as an auditor for the Malden & Melrose Gas Company. He served in World War I, as part of the 2nd Battalion, 151st Depot Brigade from Camp Devens. He eventually became the commander of a brigade and reached the rank of major. He also served as the chief of finance in the ordnance department of the Army, being named a colonel.

Following the war, Gidney became the chief accounting officer of Gulf Oil in 1920. In 1925, he became a comptroller, and in 1933, he was made vice president. He became a company director in 1941. Gidney lived in Venice, Florida, for the last years of his life, and died at a hospital in Fort Lauderdale in 1963, at the age of 81.
