= Geoffrey Burton (athlete) =

British hurdler

Personal information
- Nationality: British (English)
- Born: 23 July 1885 Barnston, Merseyside, England
- Died: 16 June 1981 (aged 95) Haxby, North Yorkshire, England

Sport
- Sport: Athletics
- Event: hurdles
- Club: Harrogate AC; Herne Hill Harriers; Broughton Harriers & AC

Geoffrey Burton (23 July 1885 – 16 June 1981) was a British hurdler who competed at the 1908 Summer Olympics.

== Biography ==
Burton was born in Barnston, Merseyside and followed his older brother Leslie into athletics.

In 1907, Geoffrey was a member of Harrogate AC when he defeated Oswald Groenings in winning a 300 yards hurdles handicap event. He then joined the Herne Hill Harriers and finished runner-up behind Alfred Healey in the 1908 Northern Counties Championship. Burton also joined his brother as a member of the Broughton Harriers & Athletic Club at one time.

Burton represented the Great Britain team at the 1908 Olympic Games in London, where he participated in the men's 400 metres hurdles competition. After receiving a walkover in his heat he was defeated by Jimmy Tremeer in the fourth semi-final after stopping with an injury.

Burton served with the Mechanical Transport Division of the Army Service Corps during World War I before taking up a career as a self-employed commission agent.
