= Edward Savage =

Edward Savage may refer to:

- Edward Savage (footballer) (born 1989), English footballer and former actor
- Edward Savage (artist) (1761–1817), American portrait painter and engraver
- Edward Savage 1628 MP for Midhurst (UK Parliament constituency)
- Edward Savage (died c. 1622), MP for Newton and Stockbridge
- Ted Savage (athlete) (1887–1920), Canadian Olympic hurdler
