= Axel Hedenlund =

Swedish high jumper

Personal information
- Born: February 11, 1888 in Borås, Västra Götaland, Sweden
- Died: April 18, 1919 (aged 31) Stockholm, Sweden

Sport
- Sport: Athletics
- Event: high jump
- Club: IK Borås

Rolf Axel Andreas Hedenlund (February 11, 1888 – April 18, 1919) was a Swedish track and field athlete who competed in the 1908 Summer Olympics. In 1908 he finished eighth in the high jump competition.

Hedenlund finished second behind Con Leahy in the high jump event at the 1908 AAA Championships.
