= John Densham =

British hurdler

Personal information
- Nationality: British (English)
- Born: 2 February 1880 Croydon, South London, England
- Died: 8 January 1975 (aged 94) Croydon, England

Sport
- Sport: Track and field
- Event: 400 metres hurdles
- Club: Herne Hill Harriers; South London Harriers

John Boon Densham (2 February 1880 – 8 January 1975) was a British hurdler who competed at the 1908 Summer Olympics.

== Biography ==
Densham was born in Croydon, South London, England, and was a member of the Herne Hill Harriers before joining South London Harriers in the summer of 1900.

Densham finished third behind Alfred Tysoe in the 880 yards event at the 1900 AAA Championships. He also raced over the 440 yards distance and finished third behind Wyndham Halswelle at the 1906 AAA Championships.

Densham switched to hurdles and gained immediate success, equalling the AAA grass record by recording 57.8 seconds in 1907.

In 1908, Densham won the British Olympic Trials and was duly named in the Great Britain team for the 1908 Olympic Games in London, where he was selected to compete in the 400 metres hurdles. In the men's 400 metres hurdles, Densham was eliminated by Harry Coe, finishing in 12th place overall.

Densham would later serve as the president for the South London Harriers and London Athletic Club.
