= Angelo Neumann =

German author, opera singer and director (1838–1910)

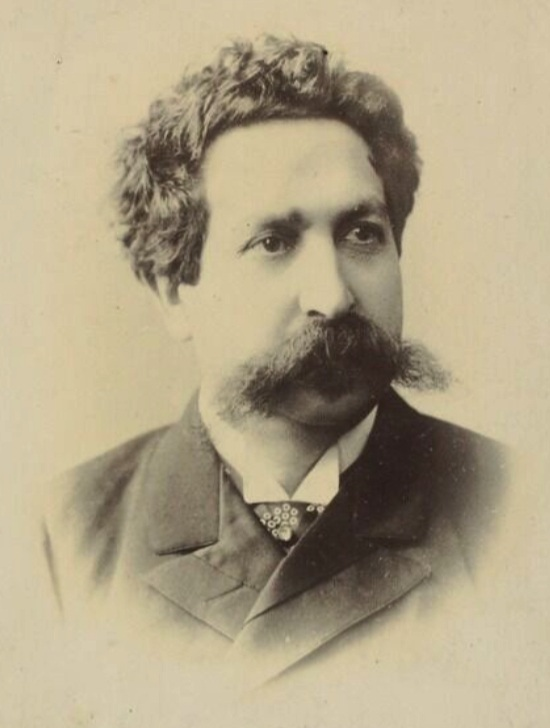
- Born: Josef Angelo Neumann; 18 August 1838; Vienna, Austria-Hungary
- Died: 20 December 1910 (aged 72); Prague, Austria-Hungary
- Occupations: Operatic baritone; Opera manager
- Organizations: Vienna Imperial Opera; Leipzig Opera; Estates Theatre

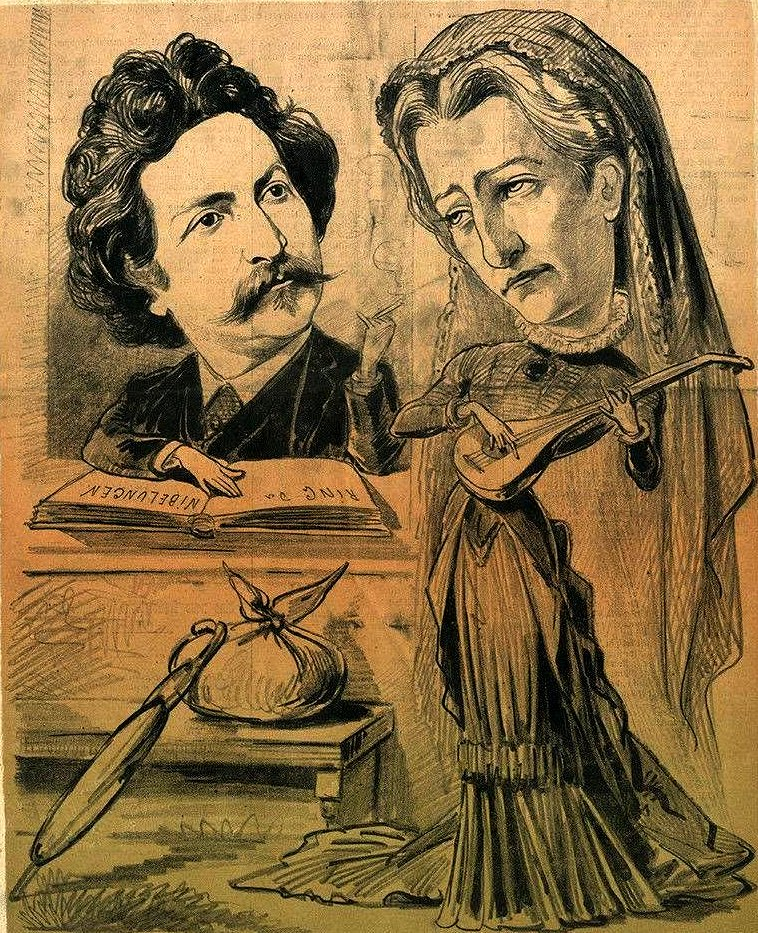
Angelo Neumann and his wife Cosima, Austrian Newspaper "Der Floh", printed 1884 in Vienna

Josef Angelo Neumann (18 August 1838 – 20 December 1910) was an Austrian theatre director, opera impresario, and opera singer. He began his career as an operatic baritone in Krakow in 1859, and spent the next several years performing at a variety of European theatres as a guest performer. From 1862 until 1876 he was a member of the Vienna Hofoper where he was present for stagings of Tannhäuser and Lohengrin directed by the composer Richard Wagner in 1875. This began an association between Neumann and Wagner which extended until Wagner's death in 1883.

Neumann became a celebrated stage director of Wagner's operas; beginning his work in that capacity while he was co-managing director of the Leipzig Opera with August Förster from 1876 to 1882. He was responsible for popularizing the Ring cycle on the global stage. He organized the first stagings of the Ring outside Bayreuth, presenting the complete Ring in Leipzig (1878 & later repetitions), Berlin (1881), and London (1882). With his own opera company, the Richard Wagner-Theater, he gave a lauded European tour of the Ring in 1882–1883 which brought Wagner a level of fame and fortune that the composer had previously not experienced. Wagner died in the midst of this tour. Neumann's Jewish ancestry and Richard and Cosima Wagner's anti-semitic beliefs led to complications in their relationship which have been the subject of study by scholars. Neumann later organized a tour of the Ring to Russia in 1889, and published a memoir, Erinnerungen an Richard Wagner (1907, English Memories of Richard Wagner).

Neumann worked as a stage director at the Bremer Stadttheater (1883–1885) prior to his appointment as artistic director of the German Theatre ( a.k.a the Estates Theatre) in Prague in 1885. Early in his tenure construction began on a new venue for that organization, the New German Theatre (NGT, now the Prague State Opera), and he transitioned into the NGT when it opened in 1888. He remained there until his death in 1910. He is credited as instigating a golden age of theatre in Prague, and turning the city into a major center for Wagner.

== Biography ==
=== Early life and opera career (1838–1876) ===
Neumann was born in Vienna on 18 August 1838. His family was Jewish. He originally intended to pursue a career in medicine before he trained as a singer. He studied voice in his native city with Therese Stilke-Sessi. He successfully auditioned for Botho von Hülsen at the Berlin Hofoper where he was offered a contract as a comprimario singer in 1859. He turned this offer down when he was offered a position as a leading baritone at the Cologne Opera. His debut there never came as the opera house was destroyed by fire in 1859, but he did give his first stage performance that same year at the Juliusz Słowacki Theatre in Krakow.

In 1860 Neumann had success on the concert stage in Vienna as a partner to soprano Thérèse Tietjens. This was followed by appearances in operas in Pressburg (now Bratislava), Prague, Ödenburg (now Sopron), and Danzig (now Gdańsk). From 1862 to 1876 he was a resident baritone at the Vienna Hofoper (VH) where he was present for stagings of Richard Wagner's Tannhäuser and Lohengrin led by the composer in 1875. Wagner had earlier attended an 1864 performance of Mozart's Don Giovanni in Stuttgart in which Neumann portrayed the title role. A heart condition led to Neumann's decision to retire from stage performance in 1876.

With his first wife Pauline Aurelie (née von Mihalovits), he had a son, Karl Eugen Neumann, born in 1865.

=== Opera director in Leipzig (1876–1882) ===
In 1876 Neumann became a stage director at the Leipzig Opera under August Förster; ultimately rising to the role of Förster's co-managing director. The first opera he staged in Leipzig was Wagner's Lohengrin. Over the next six years he directed all of Wagner's operas in Leipzig; including an 1878 staging of the complete Ring cycle. It was first time in history that the complete Ring had been staged anywhere other than Bayreuth. He later organized and directed a performance of the complete Ring given at the Victoria-Theater in Berlin in May 1881.

Under Wagner's recommendation, Neumann contracted conductor Anton Seidl to lead the 1878 Leipzig Ring, and Seidl joined the permanent conducting staff at the Leipzig Opera after this in 1879. Seidl was not the only conductor employed in this project, with Josef Sucher and Arthur Nikisch also taking on conducting responsibilities. Neumann and Seidl collaborated on several more Wagner operas in his later years in Leipzig; including a new production of Lohengrin in February 1882 which was given just after a production of Tristan und Isolde.

Neumann was also highly regarded in Leipzig for his stagings of operas by Wolfgang Amadeus Mozart and Christoph Willibald Gluck.

=== Director of the travelling Richard Wagner-Theater (1882–1883; 1889) ===
After leaving the Leipzig Opera, Neumann founded an opera company, the Richard Wagner-Theater (RWT), in 1882 for the sole purpose of touring Wagner's Ring cycle. The company also performed Beethoven's Fidelio; evidently as a backup work in case a substitution was necessary. Plans were made for this company in early 1881 at the time that Neumann was negotiating with Wagner on the upcoming Berlin Ring of 1881. With Wagner's approval, Neumann obtained the exclusive rights to perform the Ring outside Bayreuth in 1882–1883. This lauded tour significantly raised the profile of the Ring Cycle globally, and brought Wagner family wealth that they had previously not obtained.

For the RWT tour, Neumann purchased from Wagner the sets (by Josef Hoffmann, Max and Gotthold Brückner) and costumes (by Carl Emil Doepler) used in the original production of the Ring Cycle in Bayreuth. Many of the musicians he engaged for the RWT tour had worked with Neumann previously in Leipzig. Seidl was engaged as conductor, and principal singers included Marianne Brandt, Hedwig Reicher-Kindermann, Katharina Klafsky, Amalie Materna, Emil Scaria, Anton Schott, Georg Unger, Heinrich Vogl, and Therese Vogl among others.. The company performed the Ring in May and June 1882 at His Majesty's Theatre, London; a warm-up to the forthcoming European tour. It was the first time the complete Ring was performed in England.

The RWT tour officially began in Breslau (now Wrocław) in early September 1882. The tour ran until June 1883; giving a total of 135 performances of the Ring and 58 concerts featuring Wagner's music. Early stops on the Ring tour in 1882 included performances in Danzig, Magdeburg, Hamburg, Lübeck and Bremen. By December 1882 the RWT was performing in Dresden where they only performed Die Walküre and two additional concerts. After spending the 1882 Christmas holiday in Berlin, the company proceeded on to Amsterdam for performances of the Ring in The Netherlands and at La Monnaie in Brussels in January 1883.

At the end of January 1883 it was announced that the RWT would perform the Ring at La Fenice in Venice at a time when Wagner was in that city. However, Wagner died in Venice two months before the tour reached that city in April 1883, and the RWT company began to include the Funeral March from Götterdämmerung in its performances as a homage to the composer. Other cities where the tour performed in 1883 included Aachen, Basel, Bologna, Budapest, Graz, Trieste, and Turin.

Six years after the end of the tour, Neumann reformed the RWT in 1889. The company performed the Ring Cycle in a tour to Russia with Karl Muck leading the musical forces. The tour included performances at theatres in Saint Petersburg, Moscow and Kyiv. He later published the memoir Erinnerungen an Richard Wagner (1907, English: Memories of Richard Wagner) which included letter correspondence written between Neumann and Wagner. Private letters by Richard and Cosima Wagner about Neumann, many of them containing anti-semitic comments, have been a source of scholarly examination among historians. Neumann's significant contribution to both Wagner's fame and fortune was not completely unacknowledged by the composer, while simultaneously Wagner disliked that such success should come to him through a Jewish man.

=== Theatre director in Prague (1885–1910) ===
After the end of the first RWT tour, Neumann worked as a stage director at the Bremer Stadttheater from 1883 until 1885 when he was appointed artistic director of the German Theatre (GT, a.k.a the Estates Theatre) in Prague. Neumann was recruited after a period of financial hardship and instability at the GT in the hopes that he would repeat the success he had brought to the Leipzig Opera. For his first year in Prague, the 1885/1886 season, he brought in a young Gustav Mahler as music director. In his second season at the GT he staged Bizet's Carmen, the second ever in the city of Prague, which was performed in the German language in September 1886. Neumann and his second wife, the actress Johanna Török, had a daughter, the actress Isolde Milde, who was born in 1887.

In 1886 construction began on the New German Theatre (Neues deutsches Theater; now the Prague State Opera) which became the new venue for the organization led by Neumann. The New German Theatre (NGT) was inaugurated on 5 January 1888 with a performance of Wagner's Die Meistersinger von Nürnberg. Neumann remained the director of the NGT until his death in 1910. Many consider he tenure in Prague as instigating a "golden age of theatre" in the city. The city became a major center for Wagner productions under his leadership; with six complete Ring cycle productions occurring in the late 1890s alone. In 1894 the NDT staged the world premiere of Emil von Reznicek's Donna Diana under Neumann's leadership.

Some of the music directors who served under Neumann in Prague included Karl Muck (1886–1892), Franz Schalk (1886–1892), and Leo Blech (1898–1906). He established the Maifestspiele, an annual music festival held every May in Prague. Neumann was also responsible for overseeing not only for the NGT's opera and music offerings, but also its dramatic plays. He brought in several touring German theatre groups to perform at the NGT. In his later years Neumann gained a reputation for being rude, unpredictable, and demanding, which resulted in the resignations of conductors Artur Bodanzky (in 1909) and Otto Klemperer (in 1910) who had both joined the NDT's music staff in 1907.

Neumann died in Prague on 20 December 1910 at the age of 72. His death was unexpected, and occurred after a brief illness. He was succeeded at the NDT by Heinrich Teweles. The State Opera in Prague contains the Andrew Neumann Lounge which is one of the locations visited in the official guided tours of the theatre.
