= William Knyvett (athlete) =

British athlete

Personal information
- Nationality: British (English)
- Born: 28 May 1882 Jessore, British Raj
- Died: 13 February 1929 (aged 47) Patna, Bihar, India

Sport
- Sport: Athletics
- Event: hurdles
- Club: London Athletic Club

William Alexander Knyvett (28 May 1882 – 13 February 1929) was a British track and field athlete who competed in the 1908 Summer Olympics.

== Biography ==
Knyvett was born in Jessore, British Raj (modern-day Bangladesh). He was the son of A. V. Knyvett CIE, and he followed in his father's footsteps as a member of the Bengali Police. William was educated at Malvern College, Worcestershire and followed his father into the Bengal Police.

Knyvett represented Great Britain at the 1908 Summer Olympics in London. He reached the semi-finals of the 110 metre hurdles competition, where he finished with the second fastest time overall of all the semi-final heats. Nevertheless, as he was second in his heat, he was eliminated. The winner of his heat, Forrest Smithson of the USA, went on to win the Olympic Gold Medal in the final.
