= Kinahan =

Kinahan is a surname. Notable people with the surname include:

- Cecil Kinahan (1879–1912), Irish track and field athlete
- Charles Kinahan (1915–1995), Northern Irish politician
- Kinahan Organised Crime Group, led by Christy and Daniel
  - Christy Kinahan (born 1958), Irish criminal
  - Daniel Kinahan (born 1977), Irish criminal
- Danny Kinahan (born 1958), Northern Irish politician
- George Henry Kinahan (1829–1908), Irish geologist
- John Robert Kinahan (1828–1863), Irish carcinologist
- Harold Kinahan (1893–1980), British Royal Navy officer
- Kevin Kinahan (born 1971), Irish hurler
- Oliver John Kinahan (1923-2018), British Army officer
- Robin Kinahan (1916–1997), Northern Irish politician and businessman
- Robert Henry Kinahan (1799–1866), Irish politician
