= Fernand Halbart =

Belgian athletics competitor

Fernand Halbart (22 April 1882 – 23 May 1952) was a Belgian athlete. He competed at the 1908 Summer Olympics in London. In the 200 metres, Halbart finished fifth and last in his preliminary heat and did not advance to the semifinals. He also participated in the 110 metre hurdles event, where he was eliminated in the semi-finals due to being unable to finish his run.
