= Neil Patterson (athlete) =

American high jumper

John Neil "Pinky" Patterson (July 27, 1885 – December 20, 1948) was an American track and field athlete who competed in the 1908 Summer Olympics.

He was born in Detroit and died in Los Angeles.

In 1908, he finished seventh in the high jump competition.
