= Peter Marlow (athlete) =

British racewalker

Personal information
- Nationality: British (English)
- Born: 20 April 1941 (age 85) London, England
- Height: 173 cm (5 ft 8 in)
- Weight: 65 kg (143 lb)

Sport
- Sport: Athletics
- Event: racewalking
- Club: Southend AC

Peter Frederick Marlow (born 20 April 1941) is a British racewalker who competed at the 1972 Summer Olympics in Munich, finishing 17th in the 20 km walk.

== Biography ==
Marlow was born in London and was a member of Southend AC.

Marlow finished second behind Roger Mills in the 3km walk event at the 1969 AAA Championships. He would twice more finish runner-up in the 3km event at the 1974 AAA Championships and 1975 AAA Championships but did become British 10km walk champion after winning the British AAA Championships title at the 1974 AAA Championships.

He has been chief judge for racewalking at the Olympic Games in 2008, 2004 and 2000 and at other major international championships. He was elected president of the Race Walking Association in 2003. He was also a former editor of the magazine Race Walking Record for three years.

Peter is currently a member of the IAAF Race Walking Committee, having represented race walkers at IAAF since 2001

== Personal bests ==
Event	Time	Date
20 km walk	1:29:49	1974
