= Karl Eugen Neumann =

German pioneer of European Buddhism and translator (1865-1915)

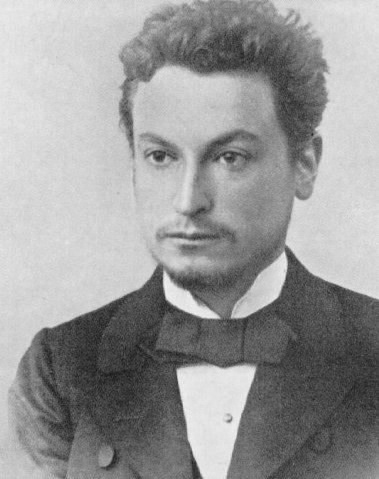
- Born: 1865; Vienna, Austrian Empire
- Died: 1915 (aged 49–50); Vienna, Austria-Hungary
- Burial place: Vienna Central Cemetery
- Father: Angelo Neumann

Karl Eugen Neumann (1865–1915) (Note: Birth and death dates are not certain. Edward P. Buffet states that Neumann was born on 16 October 1865 and died on 18 October 1915, whereas the Österreichisches Biographisches Lexikon 1815–1950 states that he was born on 18 October 1865 and died on 18 June 1915. Elsewhere it is suggested he was born on 18 October 1865 and died in 1915 on his birthday.) was the first translator of large parts of the Pali Canon of Buddhist scriptures from the original Pali into a European language (German) and one of the pioneers of European Buddhism.

== Life ==
When Neumann was born, his father, Angelo Neumann, was a Jewish Hungarian tenor at the Vienna Court Opera. His mother Pauline née von Mihalovits was the daughter of a Hungarian noble family.

He received higher education in Leipzig, where his father had become manager of the Leipzig City Theatre in 1876. Soon after starting a banker's career in Berlin in 1882, Neumann came across the works of Arthur Schopenhauer. From 1884 he became absorbed in philosophical works and showed great interest for the Indian sources that had inspired Schopenhauer. He turned his back on banking and started to attend a college in Prague. By 1887 Neumann was back in Berlin, studying Indology, Religion and Philosophy at the university there.

Soon after his marriage to Camilla née Nordmann from Vienna, Neumann went to Halle and in 1891 finished his thesis on a Pali text, his Ph.D. supervisor was Richard Pischel. In the same year he published Zwei buddhistische Suttas und ein Traktat Meister Eckharts ("Two Buddhist Suttas and a treatise of Meister Eckhart"). In 1892, after returning to Vienna, Neumann published an anthology of texts from the Pali Canon in German on the occasion of Schopenhauer's 104th birthday. Having finished a translation of the Dhammapada in 1893, Neumann realized his great desire to visit the original countries of Buddhism. For a few months he traveled through India and Ceylon, meeting members of the sangha, such as the monk Sumangala Maha Thera and Lama Dondamdup. Besides praise for the knowledge and learning of monks, he also found critical words for what he considered an adulteration and watering down of the original teaching of the Buddha. Back in Vienna in 1894 he took up a post at the Oriental Institute of the University of Vienna as an assistant to the Indologist Georg Bühler.

Within the next few years, Neumann translated and published the Majjhima Nikāya in three volumes. In 1896 he began a friendship and lively correspondence with Giuseppe De Lorenzo (1871–1957) from Bari. De Lorenzo translated Neumann's works into Italian and thus became one of the pioneers of Italian Buddhism.

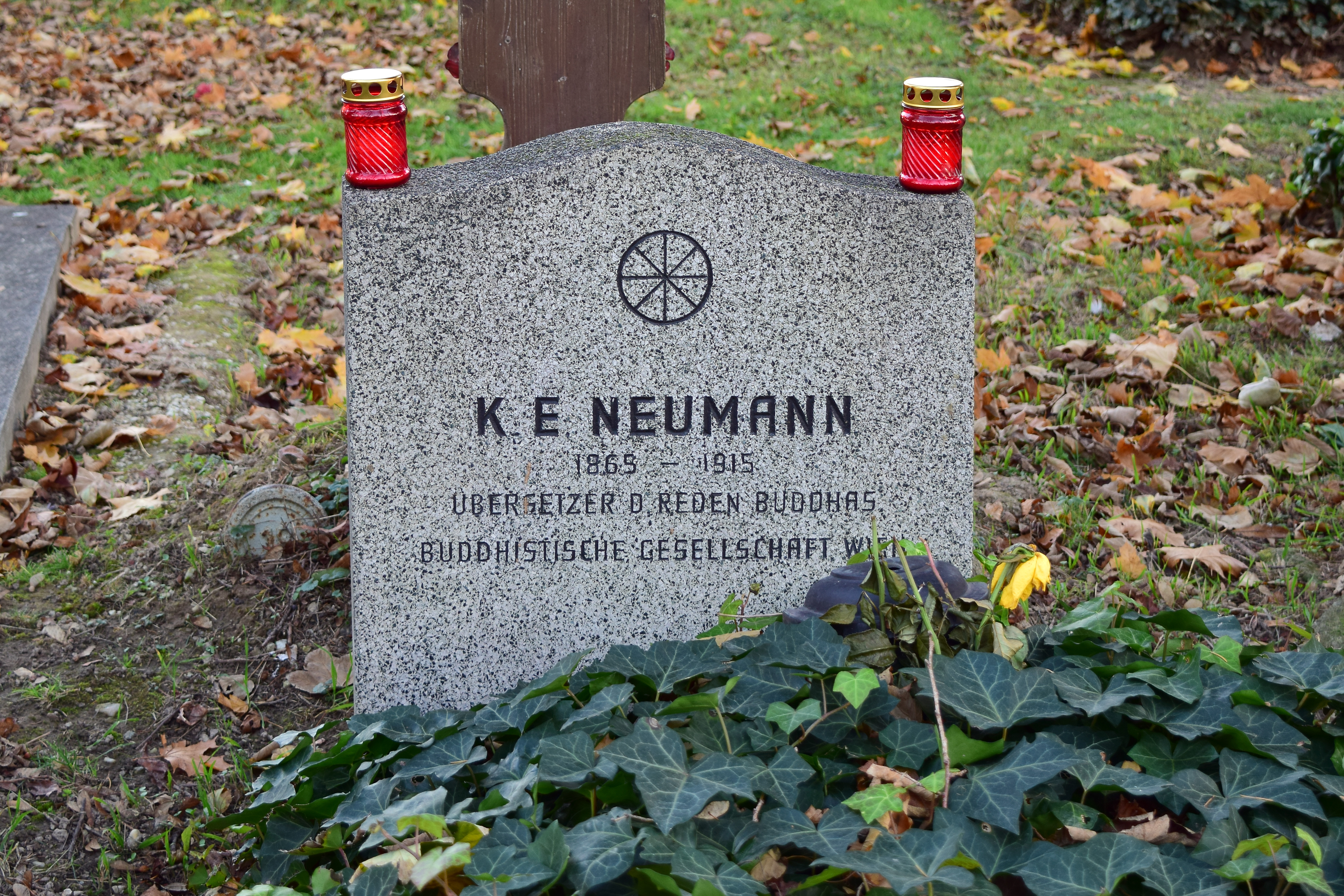
Neumann's grave in the Vienna Central Cemetery

In 1906 Neumann lost his fortune in a bank crash and even had to sell (temporarily) the highly esteemed Siamese edition of the Tipiṭaka, given to him as a present by Chulalongkorn, the king of Siam. His financial situation slightly improved through the legacy after his father's death. In 1907 he published the first volume of the Dīgha Nikāya with Piper publishers in Munich.

Neumann died in poverty in 1915, and is buried at the Vienna Central Cemetery. His grave, forgotten and neglected for two generations, came to light again by the end of the twentieth century and is being attended to by the Buddhists of Vienna.

Today, his translations are viewed as "outdated in many respects", but represent "significant pioneering work".

== Works ==
- Neumann, Karl Eugen, trans. (1922): Die Reden Gotamo Buddhos, aus der mittleren Sammlung Majjhimanikayo des Pali-Kanons, 3 Vol, R. Piper, München. (Bd.1, Bd.2, Bd.3)
- Neumann, Karl Eugen, Der Wahrheitpfad, Dhammapadam; ein buddhistisches Denkmal, München, R. Piper 1921.
- Neumann, Karl Eugen (1899). Die Lieder der Mönche und Nonnen Gotamo Buddho's, Berlin, E. Hofmann & co.
- Neumann, Karl Eugen (1911). Die Reden Gotamo Budhos, aus der Sammlung der Bruchstücke Suttanipato des Pali-Kanons, München R. Piper.
