= Haswell Wilson =

British athlete

Personal information
- Nationality: British (English)
- Born: 13 May 1884 Bristol, England
- Died: 28 February 1951 (aged 66) Birmingham, England

Sport
- Sport: Athletics
- Event: High jump
- Club: University of Glasgow AC

George Haswell Wilson (13 May 1884 – 28 February 1951) was a British athlete who competed at the 1908 Summer Olympics.

== Biography ==
Wilson was born in Bristol, England but educated at the University of Glasgow.

In 1908, Wilson came second to P. A. Mackintosh at the Scottish AAA Championship Olympic trial over the high jump but the event was based on a handicap system and Wilson posted the best jump, sealing a place at the Olympic Games.

Wilson represented the Great Britain team at the 1908 Olympic Games in London, where he participated in the men's high jump competition. In the event held on 21 July, Wilson finished in equal 10th place with a jump of 1.77 metres.

Wilson had gained a doctorate by 1909 and won the Scottish title outright in 1909.

Wilson worked at the University of Birmingham for over 25 years becoming a Professor and in addition to being chairman of pathology, he was vice-president of the Athletic Club.
