= Southend-on-Sea Athletic Club =

Athletics club in England

City of Southend-on-Sea Athletic Club
- Founded: 1905
- Ground: Southend Leisure and Tennis Centre (athletics track)
- Location: Garon Park, Eastern Avenue, Southend-on-Sea SS2 4FA, England
- Coordinates: 51°33′13″N 0°44′08″W
- Website: official website

City of Southend-on-Sea Athletic Club is an athletics club based in Essex. The club has one track, which is based at the Southend Leisure and Tennis Centre athletics track in Garon Park on Eastern Avenue, Southend-on-Sea. The club is affiliated to UK Athletics, England Athletics and the Essex County Athletic Association.

== History ==
Southend Leisure and Tennis Centre (athletics track) in 2007

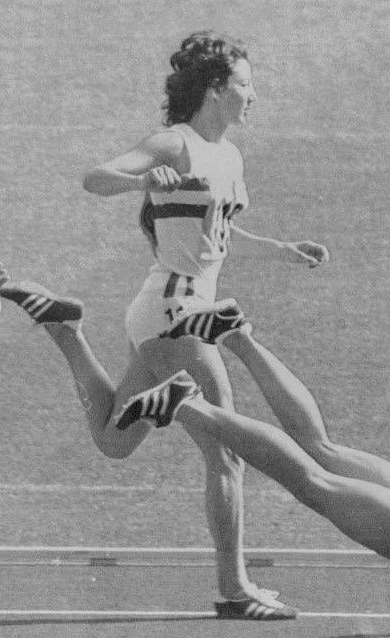
Ann Wilson in 1972

The formation of Southend-on-Sea Athletic Club took place over 100 years ago in 1905 when it was known as Southend and County Harriers (or Southend Harriers for short). The club was primarily a cross country club and held its first run on 7 October 1905 from the club's headquarters at the Blue Boar Hotel in Prittlewell. Within the first decade the club had become "A leading club in athletics".

In 1937, the Southend Harriers merged with another club called the Leigh-on-sea Harriers (founded 1912).

In 2005 the club celebrated their centenary and in the same year the Senior Men were promoted to the British Athletic League. The club is based at Southend Leisure and Tennis Centre, Garon Park, where it moved to in 1996 from its old home of Southchurch Park and in 2015 celebrated the opening of their Club House with a picture-window view of the athletic arena. The Leisure Centre is also home to many other sports such as: cricket, indoor and outdoor tennis + football, and golf.

== Notable athletes ==
=== Olympians ===
Athlete	Club	Events	Games	Medals/Ref
Frederick Harmer	Southend Harriers	400 metres hurdles	1908	
Henry Harmer	Southend Harriers	100 metres	1908	
Martyn Lucking	Southend AC	shot put	1960, 1964	
Christina Persighetti	Southend AC	long jump	1960	
Ann Wilson	Southend AC	80/100m hurdles, long jump, pentathlon	1968, 1972	
Peter Marlow	Southend AC	20 km walk	1972	
Sarah Wilhelmy	Southend AC	4×100 metres relay	2000	
