= Athletics at the 1908 Summer Olympics – Men's 400 metres hurdles =

Men's 400 metres hurdles at the Games of the IV Olympiad
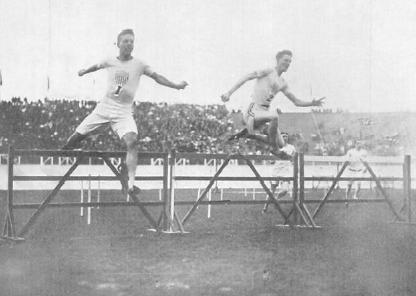
- Charles Bacon and Harry Hillman in the final.
- Venue: White City Stadium
- Dates: July 20 (quarterfinals); July 21 (semifinals); July 22 (final)
- Competitors: 15 from 6 nations
- Winning time: 55.0 WR

Medalists
1st place, gold medalist(s)		Charles Bacon; United States
2nd place, silver medalist(s)		Harry Hillman; United States
3rd place, bronze medalist(s)		Jimmy Tremeer; Great Britain

The men's 400 metres hurdles was the longer of two hurdling events at the 1908 Summer Olympics in London. It was the third time the event had been featured at the Olympics. The Olympic record was beat three times in the course of the Games. The competition was held from Monday, July 20, 1908, to Wednesday, July 22, 1908. 15 runners from six nations competed. NOCs could enter up to 12 athletes. The event was won by Charles Bacon of the United States, defeating teammate and defending champion Harry Hillman by 0.3 seconds in the final. It was the third gold medal in three Games for the American team in the event. Hillman was the first man to earn multiple medals in the 400 metres hurdles. Jimmy Tremeer of Great Britain earned bronze, the first medal for the nation in the men's 400 metres hurdles.

== Background ==
This was the third time the event was held. Introduced along with the men's 200 metres hurdles in 1900, the men's 400 metres hurdles was still on the program while the 200 was not. The 400 metres version would be held in 1900, 1904, and 1908 before being left off for one Games in 1912; when the Olympics returned after World War I, the men's 400 metres hurdles was back and would continue to be contested at every Games thereafter. One of the four hurdlers from the 1904 Games returned: gold medalist Harry Hillman of the United States.

Australasia, Great Britain, Hungary, and the Netherlands each made their debut in the event. The United States made its third appearance, the only nation to have competed at every edition of the event to that point.

== Competition format ==
The competition consisted of three rounds: quarterfinals, semifinals, and a final. Ten sets of hurdles were set on the course. The hurdles were 3 feet (= 91.5 centimetre) tall and were placed 35 metres apart beginning 45 metres from the starting line.

There were 12 quarterfinal heats scheduled, but only 11 actually were contested as one heat had no starters. There were only one or two hurdlers in each quarterfinal heat. The winner advanced in the 4 heats that had two runners. The 11 men who advanced were divided into four semifinal heats of 2 or 3 hurdlers each; again, only the fastest man advanced. The final had 4 competitors.

== Records ==
These were the standing world and Olympic records (in seconds) prior to the 1908 Summer Olympics.

World record	Charles Bacon (USA)	55.8^{*}	Philadelphia, United States	6 July 1908
Olympic record	Walter Tewksbury (USA)	57.6^{**}	Paris, France	15 July 1900

^{*} unofficial

^{**} This track was 500 metres in circumference.

Harry Hillman had run 53.0 seconds in 1904, but he knocked over a hurdle, and the hurdles were only 30 inches (76 cm) high.

In the first round, Charles Bacon set a new Olympic record with 57.0 seconds, while Hillman set a new Olympic record in the second round with 56.4 seconds.

In the Final, Bacon set a new world record with 55.0 seconds: this became the inaugural official world record for the 400 metre hurdles.

== Schedule ==
Date	Time	Round
Monday, 20 July 1908	16:45	Quarterfinals
Tuesday, 21 July 1908	16:00	Semifinals
Wednesday, 22 July 1908	15:30	Final

== Results ==
=== Quarterfinals ===
==== Quarterfinal 1 ====
There was no competition for Koops in the first heat.

Rank	Athlete	Nation	Time	Notes
1	Evert Koops	Netherlands	walkover	Q

==== Quarterfinal 2 ====
A tight race from start to finish, Coe won by about a metre.

Rank	Athlete	Nation	Time	Notes
1	Harry Coe	United States	58.8	Q
2	John Densham	Great Britain	59.0	

==== Quarterfinal 3 ====
Bacon won by 20 yards, and broke Godfrey Shaw's 440 yards world record.

Rank	Athlete	Nation	Time	Notes
1	Charles Bacon	United States	57.0	Q, OR
2	Henry St Aubyn Murray	Australasia	59.8	

==== Quarterfinal 4 ====
There was no competition for Harmer in the fourth heat.

Rank	Athlete	Nation	Time	Notes
1	Frederick Harmer	Great Britain	walkover	Q

==== Quarterfinal 5 ====
There was no competition for Burton in the fifth heat.

Rank	Athlete	Nation	Time	Notes
1	Geoffrey Burton	Great Britain	walkover	Q

==== Quarterfinal 6 ====
Dubois pulled up lame at 300 meters, leaving Hillman with the win.

Rank	Athlete	Nation	Time	Notes
1	Harry Hillman	United States	59.2	Q
—	Georges Dubois	France	DNF	

==== Quarterfinal 7 ====
There was no competition for Groenings in the seventh heat.

Rank	Athlete	Nation	Time	Notes
1	Oswald Groenings	Great Britain	walkover	Q

==== Quarterfinal 8 ====
There was no competition for Gould in the eighth heat.

Rank	Athlete	Nation	Time	Notes
1	Wyatt Gould	Great Britain	walkover	Q

==== Quarterfinal 9 ====
There was no competition for Kovacs in the ninth heat.

Rank	Athlete	Nation	Time	Notes
1	Nándor Kovács	Hungary	walkover	Q

==== Quarterfinal 10 ====
There was no competition for Tremeer in the tenth heat.

Rank	Athlete	Nation	Time	Notes
1	Jimmy Tremeer	Great Britain	walkover	Q

==== Quarterfinal 11 ====
The eleventh heat was scratched as there were no starters.

==== Quarterfinal 12 ====
In only the fourth actual race of the first round, and the third in which both runners finished, Burton caught Meslot in the straight, and won by four meters.

Rank	Athlete	Nation	Time	Notes
1	Leslie Burton	Great Britain	1:00.4	Q
2	Henri Meslot	France	1:01.0	

=== Semifinals ===
==== Semifinal 1 ====
Koops fell, leaving the Americans to race each other. Hillman defeated Coe, and broke Bacon's record from the first round.

Rank	Athlete	Nation	Time	Notes
1	Harry Hillman	United States	56.4	Q, OR
2	Harry Coe	United States	57.0	
—	Evert Koops	Netherlands	DNF	

==== Semifinal 2 ====
After Bacon started off fast, his two competitors dropped out at 200m.

Rank	Athlete	Nation	Time	Notes
1	Charles Bacon	United States	58.8	Q
—	Oswald Groenings	Great Britain	DNF	
—	Nándor Kovács	Hungary	DNF	

==== Semifinal 3 ====
Burton led after the hurdles, and despite losing ground in the straight, defeated both of his countrymen.

Rank	Athlete	Nation	Time	Notes
1	Leslie Burton	Great Britain	59.8	Q
2	Frederick Harmer	Great Britain	1:00.3	
3	Wyatt Gould	Great Britain	Unknown	

==== Semifinal 4 ====
Burton pulled up lame, allowing Tremeer to win at jogging pace.

Rank	Athlete	Nation	Time	Notes
1	Jimmy Tremeer	Great Britain	1:00.6	Q
—	Geoffrey Burton	Great Britain	DNF	

=== Final ===
The final was held on Wednesday, July 22, 1908.

Halfway into the race, it was clear that the only question was which American would win.

Bacon and Hillman were even until the straight, when Bacon broke away to win a thrilling contest by two yards: both of the Americans also came in under the world record set by Hillman in the second round.

Rank	Athlete	Nation	Time	Notes
1st place, gold medalist(s)	Charles Bacon	United States	55.0	WR
2nd place, silver medalist(s)	Harry Hillman	United States	55.3	
3rd place, bronze medalist(s)	Jimmy Tremeer	Great Britain	57.0	
4	Leslie Burton	Great Britain	58.0	

== Results summary ==
Rank	Athlete	Nation	Quarterfinals	Semifinals	Final	Notes
1st place, gold medalist(s)	Charles Bacon	United States	57.0 OR	58.8	55.0	WR
2nd place, silver medalist(s)	Harry Hillman	United States	59.2	56.4 OR	55.3	
3rd place, bronze medalist(s)	Jimmy Tremeer	Great Britain	Bye	1:00.6	57.0	
4	Leslie Burton	Great Britain	1:00.4	59.8	58.0	
5	Harry Coe	United States	58.8	57.0	Did not advance	
6	Frederick Harmer	Great Britain	Bye	1:00.3	Did not advance	
7	Wyatt Gould	Great Britain	Bye	Unknown	Did not advance	
8	Geoffrey Burton	Great Britain	Bye	DNF	Did not advance	
8	Oswald Groenings	Great Britain	Bye	DNF	Did not advance	
8	Evert Koops	Netherlands	Bye	DNF	Did not advance	
8	Nándor Kovács	Hungary	Bye	DNF	Did not advance	
12	Jack Densham	Great Britain	59.0	Did not advance		
13	Henry St Aubyn Murray	Australasia	59.8	Did not advance		
14	Henri Meslot	France	1:01.0	Did not advance		
15	Georges Dubois	France	DNF	Did not advance		
