= 1906 USA Indoor Track and Field Championships =

National athletics championship event

- Dates: November 9-10
- Host city: New York City, New York, United States
- Venue: Madison Square Garden
- Level: Senior
- Type: Indoor
- Events: 22

The 1906 USA Indoor Track and Field Championships were organized by the Amateur Athletic Union (AAU) and served as the national championships in indoor track and field for the United States.

The men's championships were held at the Madison Square Garden in New York City, New York, and they took place November 9-10. Women's championships were not officially held until 1927.

At the championships, Martin Sheridan won three out of the five events he competed in on the first day of competition.

There was an indoor national championship athletics meet held at Madison Square Garden in 1888, and as a precursor to this meet selected events were contested as a national championship as part of other meetings in 1904. However, sports historians consider the 1906 edition to be the first "official" national indoor championships.

== Medal summary ==
=== Men ===
| Event | Gold | | Silver | | Bronze | |
|---|---|---|---|---|---|---|
| 60 yards | Charles Seitz | 6.6 | James O'Connell | | Smye Northridge | |
| 75 yards | Charles Seitz | 8 0/5 | James O'Connell | | L. B. Stevens | |
| 150 yards | Lawson Robertson | 16 1/5 | W. T. Coholan | | L. B. Stevens | |
| 300 yards | Lawson Robertson | 34.0 | Harry Sedley | | Peter Waters | |
| 600 yards | Eli Parsons | 1:14.6 | Charles Bacon | | Harry Sedley | |
| 1000 yards | Mel Sheppard | 2:17.8 | Charles Bacon | | Joseph Bromilow | |
| 2 miles | George Bonhag | 9:39.2 | William Frank | | John Daly | |
| 5 miles | George Bonhag | 26:01 2/5 | William Nelson | | William Frank | |
| 220 yards hurdles | John Eller | 28 4/5 | C. B. Toole | | E. L. Ovington | |
| 300 yards hurdles | Harry Hillman | 36 2/5 | John Eller | | C. B. Toole | |
| High jump | Herbert Gidney | 1.79 m | John Ryan | 5 ft 9 1/2 in (1.76 m) | Jerry Mahoney | 5 ft 9 in (1.75 m) |
| Standing high jump | Ray Ewry | 5 ft 2 in (1.57 m) | I. F. Weber | 5 ft 0 in (1.52 m) | John Biller | 4 ft 9 in (1.44 m) |
| Pole vault | Alfred Carlton Gilbert | 3.28 m | Martin Sheridan | 10 ft 0 in (3.04 m) | Willard McLeod | 9 ft 6 in (2.89 m) |
| Pole vault for distance | Martin Sheridan | 27 ft 1 1/2 in (8.26 m) | Willard McLeod | 24 ft 5 in (7.44 m) | M. Peabody | 24 ft 2 1/2 in (7.37 m) |
| Standing long jump | Ray Ewry | 3.39 m | Martin Sheridan | 10 ft 6 in (3.2 m) | I. F. Weber | 10 ft 4 1/2 in (3.16 m) |
| Triple jump | James O'Connell | 13.81 m | Floyd Risley | 44 ft 8 1/2 in (13.62 m) | Martin Sheridan | 42 ft 0 1/2 in (12.81 m) |
| Standing triple jump | Martin Sheridan | 32 ft 7 1/4 in (9.93 m) | Ray Ewry | 32 ft 5 in (9.88 m) | L. B. Packard | 31 ft 5 1/4 in (9.58 m) |
| Shot put (8 lbs) | Martin Sheridan | 61 ft 8 in (18.79 m) | Jerry Mahoney | 53 ft 2 in (16.2 m) | John Ryan | 53 ft 0 in (16.15 m) |
| Shot put (24 lbs) | Martin Sheridan | 33 ft 1 in (10.08 m) | James Sarsfield Mitchell | 29 ft 1 in (8.86 m) | E. Pellinger | 27 ft 8 1/2 in (8.44 m) |
| Weight throw for height | Martin Sheridan | 15 ft 3 in (4.64 m) | John Burke | 15 ft 0 in (4.57 m) | James Sarsfield Mitchell | 14 ft 9 in (4.49 m) |
