= William Rand (athlete) =

American hurdler

William McNear Rand (April 7, 1886 – October 5, 1981) was an American track and field athlete and businessman. He competed at the 1908 Summer Olympics in London. He was born in Watertown, Massachusetts and died in Lincoln, Massachusetts. He graduated from Harvard University.

Rand won his first-round heat of the 110 metre hurdles with a time of 15.8 seconds, breaking away from his competitors at the ninth hurdle. The ninth hurdle was again the place where Rand made his winning move in the second round, and he finished in 15.8 seconds there as well. This made him one of the four runners to advance to the final of the 110 metre hurdles. There, he finished fourth in a time of 16.0 seconds.

Rand later became president of Monsanto Chemical Corporation, succeeded by Charles Allen Thomas in 1951. The same year, he was elected fellow of the American Academy of Arts and Sciences.
