= Leonard Howe =

American hurdler

Leonard Vernon Howe (December 10, 1886 – August 30, 1955) was an American track and field athlete who competed in the 1908 Summer Olympics. He died in Los Angeles, California. In 1908, he was eliminated in the semi-finals of the 110 metre hurdles event after finishing third in his heat.
