= Oswald Groenings =

British athlete

Personal information
- Born: 20 May 1880 Middlesbrough, England
- Died: 24 March 1965 (aged 84) London, England

Sport
- Sport: Athletics
- Event: hurdles/high jump
- Club: Polytechnic Harriers

Oswald Jacob Groenings (later Birkbeck, 20 May 1880 – 24 March 1965) was a British track and field athlete who competed in the 1908 Summer Olympics.

== Biography ==
Groenings born in Middlesbrough, finished second behind Robert Stronach in the 120 yards hurdles event and second behind Con Leahy in the high jump event at the 1906 AAA Championships. Groenings became the National 120 yards hurdles champion after winning the AAA Championships title at the 1907 AAA Championships and 1908 AAA Championships.

Groenings represented Great Britain at the 1908 Summer Olympics in London, where he competed in hurdles events. He was eliminated in the semi-finals of the 400 metre hurdles competition after finishing second in his heat. He also participated in the 110 metre hurdles event and was eliminated in the semi-finals again after finishing fourth in his heat.

He died in London on 24 March 1965.
