= Forrest Smithson =

American athlete

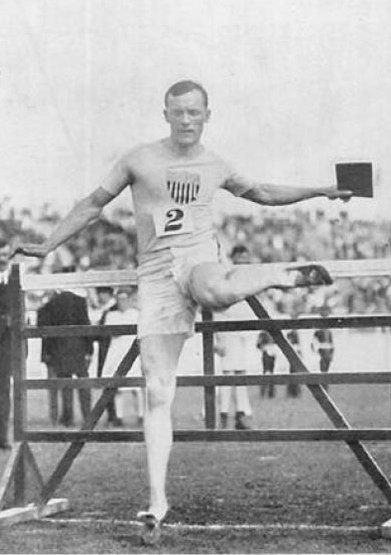
- Smithson and his running "style".

Personal information
- Born: September 26, 1884 Portland, Oregon, USA
- Died: November 25, 1962 (aged 78) Contra Costa County, California, USA
Medal record
Men's athletics
Representing the United States
Olympic Games
Gold medal – first place	1908 London	110 m hurdles

Forrest Custer Smithson (September 26, 1884 – November 25, 1962) was an American athlete, winner of 110 m hurdles at the 1908 Summer Olympics.

Born in Portland, Oregon, Smithson was a student of theology from Oregon State University and an AAU champion in 1907 and 1909 in the 120 yd (110 m) hurdles.

At London, the main favourites were Smithson's teammates John Garrels and Arthur Shaw, who had earlier equaled Alvin Kraenzlein's world record of 15.2 seconds. The 110 m hurdles were not contested on a track as usual but on a special path in the stadium grass. Only Americans reached the final, which was contested on the last day of the London Games. Smithson defeated Garrels and set a new world record of 15.0 seconds.

Forrest Smithson died in Contra Costa County, California, aged 78.

== Bible story ==
There is a widespread story about Smithson winning the gold medal while carrying a Bible in his left hand (ostensibly to protest against the decision to run the 110 m hurdles final on a Sunday). At first, neither the 110 m hurdles heats nor the final were scheduled or planned to take place on Sunday. The story was not mentioned in the newspapers. This story is based on a picture published in the official report, which was taken during the final.

The fact was that Forrest Smithson was a strong Christian and often ran with a Bible in his hand to point people to the source of his strength and inspiration; his relationship with Jesus Christ.
