= 1974 AAA Championships =

Outdoor track and field competition

- Dates: 12–13 July 1974
- Host city: London, England
- Venue: Crystal Palace National Sports Centre
- Level: Senior
- Type: Outdoor

The 1974 AAA Championships was the 1974 edition of the annual outdoor track and field competition organised by the Amateur Athletic Association (AAA). It was held from July 12th to 13th, 1974, at Crystal Palace National Sports Centre in London, England.

== Summary ==
The Championships covered two days of competition. The marathon was held in Windsor and the decathlon event was held in Wolverhampton.

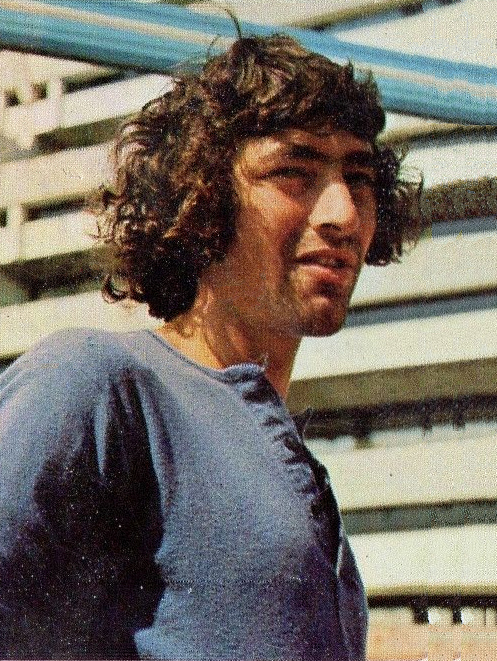
Dave Bedford won his 5th consecutive 10,000m AAA title

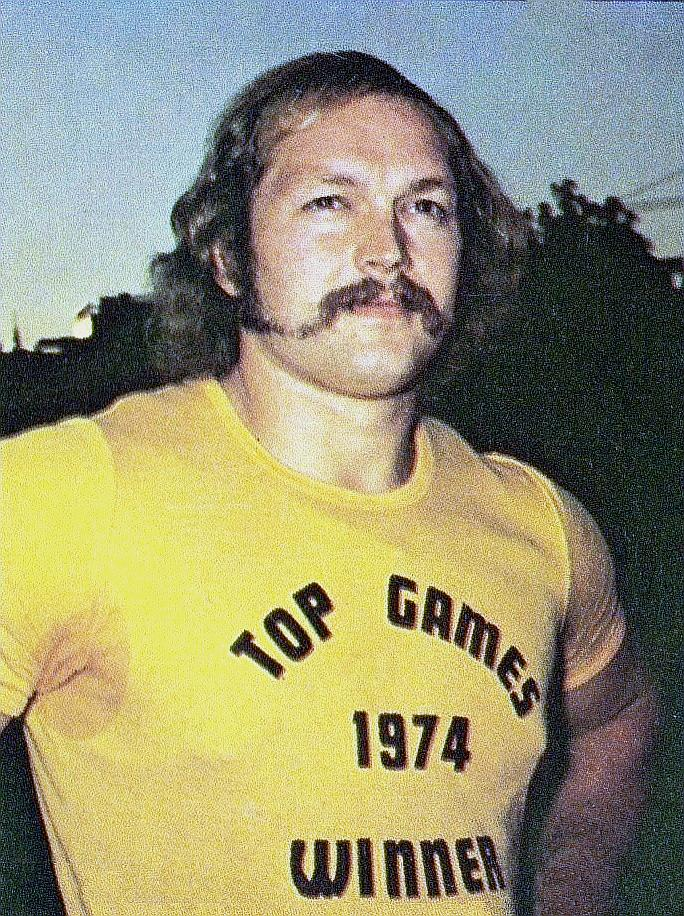
Al Feuerbach was one of eight Americans to win a title

== Results ==
Event	Gold		Silver		Bronze	
100m	(United States) Steve Williams	10.16w	(Scotland) Don Halliday	10.42w	Brian Green	10.45w
200m	(United States) Mark Lutz	20.9w	Chris Monk	21.0w	Ainsley Bennett	21.0w
400m	(Scotland) David Jenkins	46.11	Steve Marlow	47.24	(Republic of Ireland) Fanahan McSweeney	47.26
800m	Steve Ovett	1:46.84	Andy Carter	1:47.02	(Jamaica) Byron Dyce	1:47.10
1,500m	(United States) Tony Waldrop	3:41.9	(Australia) Graham Crouch	3:42.2	Ray Smedley	3:42.8
5,000m	Brendan Foster	13:27.4	(Netherlands) Jos Hermens	13:35.2	(Switzerland) Werner Meier	13:38.4
10,000m	Dave Bedford	28:14.80	Bernie Ford	28:15.84	(Wales) Tony Simmons	28:19.29
marathon	(Japan) Akio Usami	2:15:16	Bernie Plain	2:18:32	(East Germany) Eckhard Lesse	2:18:44
3000m steeplechase	(Wales) John Davies	8:26.8	(Japan) Takaharu Koyama	8:32.6	(Sweden) Dan Glans	8:33.6
110m hurdles	(Wales) Berwyn Price	13.94w	Graham Gower	14.16w	(Northern Ireland) Charles Kirkpatrick	14.17w
400m hurdles	(United States) Jim Bolding	49.1	Bill Hartley	50.6	Colin O'Neill	51.4
3,000m walk	Roger Mills	12:27.0	Peter Marlow	12:28.4	Brian Adams	12:40.2
10,000m walk	Peter Marlow	44:58.4	Brian Adams	45:51.0	Shaun Lightman	46:30.0
high jump	(United States) Dwight Stones	2.14	(United States) Pat Matzdorf	2.14	(West Germany) Eckart Eitel	2.11
pole vault	(United States) Casey Carrigan	5.10	(United States) Mike Tully	4.90	(United States) Bob Richards	4.90
long jump	Alan Lerwill	7.77	Geoff Hignett	7.48	(Scotland) Stewart Atkins	7.30
triple jump	(Japan) Toshiaki Inoue	16.12	(Scotland) Willie Clark	15.78	Bob Johnson	15.40
shot put	(United States) Al Feuerbach	21.37	Geoff Capes	20.77	(United States) George Woods	20.69
discus throw	(United States) John Powell	62.06	Bill Tancred	60.02	John Hillier	57.96
hammer throw	(South Africa) Adam Barnard	70.62	Howard Payne	67.50	Barry Williams	67.26
javelin throw	Dave Travis	75.20	Kevin Shappard	73.34	Brian Roberts	71.94
decathlon	Mike Corden	7035	Alan Drayton	6786	(Barbados) Clifford Brooks	6642

== See also ==
- 1974 WAAA Championships
