= James O'Connell (long jumper) =

American long jumper (1882–1942)

Personal information
- Full name: James Francis V. O'Connell
- Born: October 11, 1882 Hartford, Connecticut, United States
- Died: July 10, 1942 (aged 59) Hartford, Connecticut, United States

Sport
- Sport: Athletics
- Event: Long jump

James Francis V. O'Connell (October 11, 1882 – July 10, 1942) was an American athlete. He competed in the men's long jump at the 1908 Summer Olympics.

O'Connell won the 1906 USA Indoor Track and Field Championships in the triple jump and finished runner-up in the 75 yards. He competed for the Villanova Wildcats track and field team and the New York Athletic Club.

Personally, O'Connell was a member of the Hartford Police Department and worked as a traffic checker late into his life.
