= Sándor Török (sport shooter) =

Hungarian sports shooter

Personal information
- Born: 14 February 1881 Vienna, Austria-Hungary
- Died: 13 February 1939 (aged 57) Budapest, Hungary

Sport
- Sport: Sports shooting

Sándor Bernát Ede Bálint Kázmér, Count Török de Szendrő (14 February 1881 – 13 February 1939) was a Hungarian sportsman, nobleman and diplomat. He competed at the 1906 Intercalated Games and the 1912 Summer Olympics.

Török was the son of actress Johanna Buska. Buska had an affair with Rudolf, Crown Prince of Austria, before marrying nobleman Count Miklós Török de Szendrő, and some have proposed that Török's father was Rudolf. After receiving his secondary education in Dresden and Vienna, and then studying at universities in Vienna and Cluj-Napoca, he became a doctor of law. He was active in sports, serving as president of his university's athletic club and later, after graduating, being active in tennis, fencing, and sport shooting. He was considered among the first Hungarian tennis players and was the first vice president of the Hungarian Fencing Association. Török competed at the 1906 Intercalated Games and the 1912 Summer Olympics in sport shooting. He competed in eight events at the former and four at the latter, with a best placement of fifth in the dueling pistol event at the former.

Török was active in motor racing following World War I. He competed in "countless competitions" and was one of the leading figures in the Hungarian racing scene, serving as chairman of an automobile company and on the boards of the Royal Hungarian Automobile Club and the Hungarian Touring Club. He was also a writer and authored many articles on the topic of cars, which were featured in Hungarian, German, English, and French newspapers.

Outside of sports, Török worked as a diplomat for the Foreign Ministry of Austria-Hungary, serving at the embassies in Washington and Berlin before retiring following World War I. He died on 13 February 1939. His obituary in Nemzeti Ujság described him as one of the leaders of Hungarian notability and sports, describing him as someone who contributed to the flourishing Hungarian motor racing.
