= Athletics at the 1908 Summer Olympics – Men's 110 metres hurdles =

Men's 110 metres hurdles at the Games of the IV Olympiad
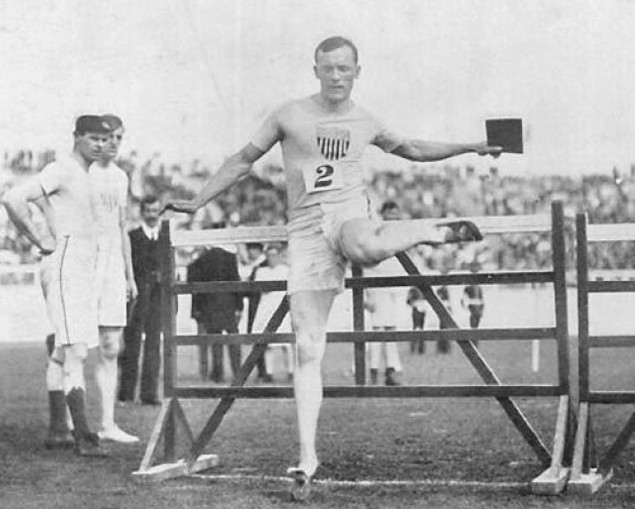
- Forrest Smithson, winner of the 110 m hurdles at the 1908 Summer Olympics. This picture showing a jump with a bible in his hand was taken after the race.
- Venue: White City Stadium
- Dates: July 23, 1908 (round 1); July 24, 1908 (semifinals); July 25, 1908 (final)
- Competitors: 25 from 10 nations
- Winning time: 15.0 WR

Medalists
1st place, gold medalist(s)		Forrest Smithson; United States
2nd place, silver medalist(s)		John Garrels; United States
3rd place, bronze medalist(s)		Arthur Shaw; United States

The men's 110 metres hurdles was the shorter of two hurdling events at the 1908 Summer Olympics in London. It was dominated by the American runners. The competition was held from Thursday, July 23, 1908, to Saturday, July 25, 1908. 25 hurdlers from ten nations competed. NOCs could enter up to 12 athletes. The event was won by Forrest Smithson of the United States, the fourth of five consecutive victories for the nation in the first five Olympic Games. It was also the third of four consecutive podium sweeps for the Americans in the event.

== Background ==
This was the fourth appearance of the event, which is one of 12 athletics events to have been held at every Summer Olympics. None of the hurdlers from 1904 returned. The Americans were favored, but it was difficult to determine which one. Forrest Smithson was the winner of the 1907 AAU title and Western Olympic trials; Arthur Shaw was the 1908 AAU and IC4A champion; John Garrels was the 1907 IC4A champion and Central Olympic trials winner; and Leonard Howe had won the Eastern Olympic trials.

Belgium, Canada, Norway, South Africa, and Sweden each made their first appearance in the event, as did the combined Australia/New Zealand team "Australasia" (though Australia had competed in 1904). The United States made its fourth appearance, the only nation to have competed in the 110 metres hurdles in each Games to that point.

== Competition format ==
There were three rounds for the first time. The first round consisted of 14 heats, many of which had only one hurdler and none of which had more than three. The top hurdler in each heat advanced to the semifinals. The 14 semifinalists were divided into four semifinals of 3 or 4 runners each; again, only the top hurdler advanced to the 4-man final.

Ten sets of hurdles were set on the course. The hurdles were 3 feet 6 inches (1.07 m) tall and were placed ten yards (9.1 m) apart beginning fifteen yards (14 m) from the starting line.

== Records ==
These were the standing world and Olympic records (in seconds) prior to the 1908 Summer Olympics.

World record	15.0(*)	(United States) Thaddeus Shideler	St. Louis (USA)	June 11, 1904
Olympic record	15.4	(United States) Alvin Kraenzlein	Paris (FRA)	July 14, 1900

(*) unofficial 120 yards (= 109.73 m)

Forrest Smithson equalled the Olympic record when he ran 15.4 seconds in his semifinal. In the final he set the first official world record (ratified by the IAAF in 1912) in this event with 15.0 seconds.

== Schedule ==
Date	Time	Round
Thursday, 23 July 1908	15:30	Round 1
Friday, 24 July 1908	11:30	Semifinals
Saturday, 25 July 1908	11:30	Final

== Results ==
=== Round 1 ===
The first round heats were held on July 23, 1908, making the short hurdles one of the last events to begin. The Americans won every race in which they competed. The British team also had a strong showing, winning any time that there was no American in the race.

==== Heat 1 ====
Healey won by four yards after leading from the start.

Rank	Athlete	Nation	Time	Notes
1	Alfred Healey	Great Britain	15.8	Q
2	Henry Murray	Australasia	16.3	
3	Doug Stupart	South Africa	Unknown	

==== Heat 2 ====
Garrels won by seven yards.

Rank	Athlete	Nation	Time	Notes
1	John Garrels	United States	16.2	Q
2	Arthur Halligan	Great Britain	17.1	

==== Heat 3 ====
Groenings led by five yards at the finish.

Rank	Athlete	Nation	Time	Notes
1	Oswald Groenings	Great Britain	16.4	Q
2	Georgios Skoutarides	Greece	17.0	

==== Heat 4 ====
Kiely had no competition in the first round.

Rank	Athlete	Nation	Time	Notes
1	Laurence Kiely	Great Britain	WO	Q

==== Heat 5 ====
Rand and Powell were even for most of the race. Powell hit the ninth hurdle, slowing him just enough for Rand to take the lead and win.

Rank	Athlete	Nation	Time	Notes
1	William Rand	United States	15.8	Q
2	Kenneth Powell	Great Britain	16.2	
3	Ted Savage	Canada	Unknown	

==== Heat 6 ====
Lemming fell during the race, allowing Walters to win while easing up.

Rank	Athlete	Nation	Time	Notes
1	Wallis Walters	Great Britain	17.8	Q
—	Oscar Lemming	Sweden	DNF	

==== Heat 7 ====
The seventh heat was another in which there was no competition.

Rank	Athlete	Nation	Time	Notes
1	William Knyvett	Great Britain	WO	Q

==== Heat 8 ====
Halbart won without competition.

Rank	Athlete	Nation	Time	Notes
1	Fernand Halbart	Belgium	WO	Q

==== Heat 9 ====
Ahearne was the fourth runner to win without a contest.

Rank	Athlete	Nation	Time	Notes
1	Tim Ahearne	Great Britain	WO	Q

==== Heat 10 ====
Smithson won by ten yards.

Rank	Athlete	Nation	Time	Notes
1	Forrest Smithson	United States	15.8	Q
2	Nándor Kovács	Hungary	17.2	

==== Heat 11 ====
Blijstad fell, allowing Hussey to win with a jog.

Rank	Athlete	Nation	Time	Notes
1	Eric Hussey	Great Britain	16.8	Q
—	Wilhelm Blystad	Norway	DNF	

==== Heat 12 ====
Kinahan had an easy win by ten yards.

Rank	Athlete	Nation	Time	Notes
1	Cecil Kinahan	Great Britain	16.8	Q
2	Oscar Guttormsen	Norway	18.2	

==== Heat 13 ====
Howe and Leader were even over the hurdles, but Howe edged out Leader in the straight.

Rank	Athlete	Nation	Time	Notes
1	Leonard Howe	United States	15.8	Q
2	Edward Leader	Great Britain	16.1	

==== Heat 14 ====
Shaw won without a contest.

Rank	Athlete	Nation	Time	Notes
1	Arthur Shaw	United States	WO	Q

=== Semifinals ===
The semifinal round was held on July 24, 1908. Each of the four heats of the second round were won by American runners.

==== Semifinal 1 ====
Shaw took the lead at the first set of hurdles, finishing about five metres ahead of Hussey.

Rank	Athlete	Nation	Time	Notes
1	Arthur Shaw	United States	15.6	Q
2	Eric Hussey	Great Britain	16.5	
3	David Walters	Great Britain	16.9	
4	Oswald Groenings	Great Britain	Unknown	

==== Semifinal 2 ====
Smithson had no trouble winning this heat, tying the Olympic record as he did so.

Rank	Athlete	Nation	Time	Notes
1	Forrest Smithson	United States	15.4	Q, =OR
2	William Knyvett	Great Britain	15.6	
3	Leonard Howe	United States	15.8	

==== Semifinal 3 ====
Healey led for most of the race, with Rand close behind, but Healey was unable to clear the ninth hurdle cleanly, allowing Rand to pass him and win by a foot.

Rank	Athlete	Nation	Time	Notes
1	William Rand	United States	15.8	Q
2	Alfred Healey	Great Britain	15.9	
3	Laurence Kiely	Great Britain	Unknown	
4	Tim Ahearne	Great Britain	Unknown	

==== Semifinal 4 ====
Halbert pulled up lame, and Garrels won by 15 yards.

Rank	Athlete	Nation	Time	Notes
1	John Garrels	United States	15.8	Q
2	Cecil Kinahan	Great Britain	17.5	
—	Fernand Halbert	Belgium	DNF	

=== Final ===
Smithson pulled away from his countrymen at every set of hurdles to win by five meters and set a new world record.

Rank	Athlete	Nation	Time	Notes
1st place, gold medalist(s)	Forrest Smithson	United States	15.0	WR
2nd place, silver medalist(s)	John Garrels	United States	15.7	
3rd place, bronze medalist(s)	Arthur Shaw	United States	15.8	
4	William Rand	United States	16.0	

== Notes ==
- Cook, Theodore Andrea (1908). The Fourth Olympiad, Being the Official Report. London: British Olympic Association.
- De Wael, Herman (2001). "Athletics 1908". Herman's Full Olympians. Archived from the original on 27 September 2006.
- Wudarski, Pawel (1999). "Wyniki Igrzysk Olimpijskich" (in Polish).
