= Leslie Burton =

British hurdler (1882–1946)

Personal information
- Nationality: British (English)
- Born: 15 October 1882 Heswall, England
- Died: 10 June 1946 (aged 63) Scarborough, England

Sport
- Sport: Athletics
- Event: hurdles
- Club: Broughton Harriers & AC

Leslie Aubrey Burton (15 October 1882 – 10 June 1946) was a British athlete who competed at the 1908 Summer Olympics.

== Biography ==
Burton was born in Heswall, Merseyside, held the English 300 yards hurdles record. Burton's brother Geoffrey was also an Olympic athlete.

Burton represented Great Britain at the 1908 Summer Olympics in London. In the men's 400 metres hurdles, Burton won his first-round heat with a time of 1:00.4 to advance to the second round. There, he won again by establishing such a lead over the hurdles that he could not be caught in the straight. In the final, Burton finished last of the four runners with a time of 58.0 seconds.

He died in Scarborough, North Yorkshire. His daughter Elaine Burton, Baroness Burton of Coventry was a politician.
