= Anton Schott =

German dramatic tenor

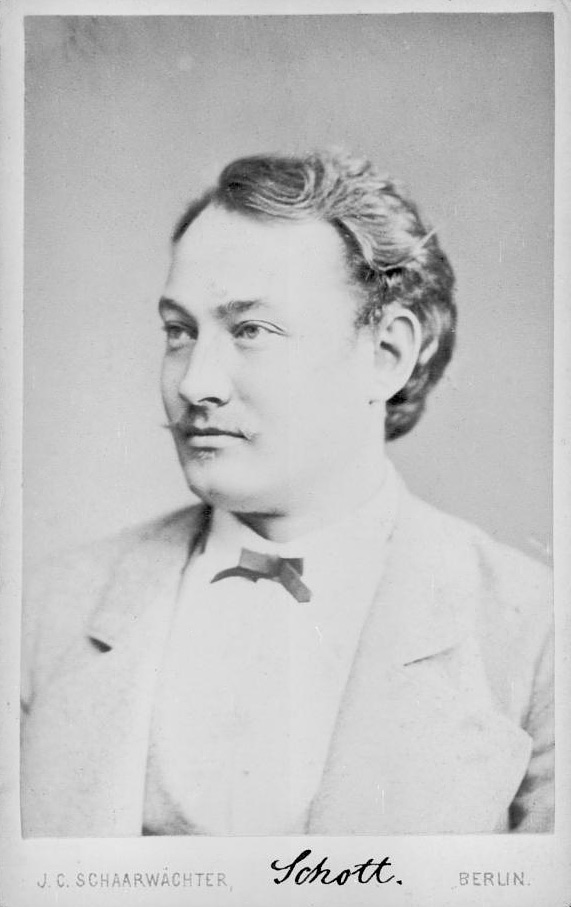
Anton Schott.

Anton Schott (born Schloss Staufeneck, Bavaria, June 24, 1846 - died Stuttgart, January 6, 1913) was a German dramatic tenor. He was an army officer before turning to a musical career. In 1871 he began his studies with Agnes Schebest-Strauss, and by the end of the year had already appeared at the Munich Opera. The following year saw him engaged as leading lyric tenor of the Berlin State Opera. In 1880 he made his London debut, in the title role of Rienzi; two years later he went to Italy with Angelo Neumann's company to appear in the works of Richard Wagner. He made his American debut at the Metropolitan Opera on November 17, 1884, singing the title role of Wagner's Tannhäuser; it marked the beginning of Leopold Damrosch's first season of German opera with the company. He remained with the company until 1887, and subsequently was heard in guest performances with European and South American companies. He also gave concerts. Schott died in 1913.
