= Laurence Kiely =

Irish hurdler

Personal information
- Nationality: Irish
- Born: 22 October 1880 Ballyneale, Tipperary, Ireland
- Died: 12 December 1961 (aged 81) Ballyneale, Tipperary, Ireland

Sport
- Sport: Track and field
- Event: 110 metres hurdles
- Club: Ballynea, Carrick-on-Suir

Laurence Kiely (22 October 1880 – 12 December 1961) was an Irish hurdler who competed at the 1908 Summer Olympics.

== Biography ==
Kiely was born in Ballyneale, Tipperary and followed his older brother Tom into athletics. In 1901, Laurence won the Gaelic hammer title and three years later won the Gaelic 120y hurdles title. He then won two Irish AAA titles, the hurdles in 1906 and the hammer throw event in 1907, where he tied with Denis Carey.

Kiely represented Great Britain at the 1908 Summer Olympics in London, where he competed in the men's 110 metres hurdles competition.

After retiring from competition he became a farmer in Ballyneale.
