= Tom Moffitt =

American high jumper

Thomas Robinson Moffitt (February 26, 1884 – May 2, 1945) was an American track and field athlete who competed in the 1908 Summer Olympics. In 1908 he finished fifth in the high jump competition.
