= Arthur Halligan =

New Zealand hurdler

Personal information
- Nationality: New Zealander
- Born: 10 November 1886 Dannevirke, Manawatu-Wanganui, New Zealand
- Died: 16 May 1942 (aged 55) Paremata, Wellington, New Zealand

Sport
- Sport: Athletics
- Event: middle-distance
- Club: West of Scotland Harriers

Cyril Arthur Halligan (10 November 1886 – 16 May 1942) was a New Zealander who competed for Great Britain at the 1908 Summer Olympics.

== Biography ==
Halligan was born in Dannevirke, Manawatu-Wanganui and spent time in Scotland, where he was a member of the West of Scotland Harriers (a club which went out of existence in 1978). From 1908 to 1910, he represented Scotland against Ireland three times.

Halligan represented Great Britain at the 1908 Summer Olympics in London. In the 110 metre hurdles event, he finished second in his heat, but only the winners advanced to the semi-finals.

Halligan won the Scottish 120 yards hurdles title in 1909 and eventually returned to New Zealand, where he won the same event in 1915.
