= Athletics at the 1908 Summer Olympics – Men's high jump =

Men's high jump at the Games of the IV Olympiad
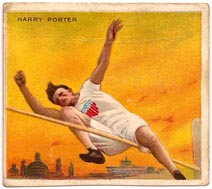
- Card depicting Harry Porter
- Venue: White City Stadium
- Date: July 21, 1908
- Competitors: 22 from 10 nations
- Winning height: 1.90 =OR

Medalists
1st place, gold medalist(s)		Harry Porter; United States
2nd place, silver medalist(s)		Géo André; France
2nd place, silver medalist(s)		Con Leahy; Great Britain
2nd place, silver medalist(s)		István Somodi; Hungary

The men's high jump was one of six jumping events on the athletics at the 1908 Summer Olympics programme in London. The competition was held on Tuesday, July 21, 1908. Twenty-two high jumpers from ten nations competed. NOCs could enter up to 12 athletes. The event was won by Harry Porter of the United States, the nation's fourth consecutive victory in the men's high jump. There was a three-way tie for silver (a jump-off was held, but was unable to resolve the tie).

== Background ==
This was the fourth appearance of the event, which is one of 12 athletics events to have been held at every Summer Olympics. No jumpers from the 1904 Games returned. The favorite was Irish jumper Con Leahy, the four-time (1905–1908) AAA champion who had also won the 1907 AAU title and the 1906 Intercalated Games. American Harry Porter, the 1908 AAU champion, was also highly regarded.

Belgium, Canada, Finland, and the Netherlands each made their debut in the event. The United States appeared for the fourth time, having competed at each edition of the Olympic men's high jump to that point.

== Competition format ==
There were two rounds of jumping, though the results from the qualifying round carried over to the final. The top eight jumpers in the qualifying round advanced to the final. Each competitor received three attempts at each height. The judges determined the initial height of the bar and any increases. There was a jump-off of the tie for second, but details are unknown. "Diving" and "somersaulting" were not allowed.

== Records ==
These were the standing world and Olympic records (in metres) prior to the 1908 Summer Olympics.

World record	Michael Sweeney (USA)	1.97(*)	New York, United States	21 September 1895
Olympic record	Irving Baxter (USA)	1.90	Paris, France	15 July 1900

(*) unofficial

Harry Porter equalized the standing Olympic record with 1.90 metres.

== Schedule ==
Date	Time	Round
Tuesday, 21 July 1908	10:30; 14:30	Qualifying; Final

== Results ==
After the first of four qualifying groups finished, officials determined that the ground conditions were unsuitable and chose a different location for the remaining three groups. Herbert Gidney protested, resulting in a repeat of the first group. Gidney benefited, improving his height from 1.77 metres in the now-invalidated initial round to 1.85 metres in the re-jump. He displaced as finalists Otto Monsen, who had initially jumped 1.79 metres but refused to participate in the re-jump, and Edward Leader, whose initial 1.79 metres was replaced by the inferior 1.77 metres he achieved in the re-jump.

There was a jump-off for second place after three men jumped 1.88 metres but could not match Porter's 1.90 metres, but none of the three jumpers were able to jump 1.88 metres again and were declared joint silver medalists.

Porter, after winning, attempted the world record height of 1.97 metres; his three attempts at that height were all unsuccessful.

Rank	Athlete	Nation	Height
1st place, gold medalist(s)	Harry Porter	United States	1.90
2nd place, silver medalist(s)	Géo André	France	1.88
2nd place, silver medalist(s)	István Somodi	Hungary	1.88
2nd place, silver medalist(s)	Con Leahy	Great Britain	1.88
5	Herbert Gidney	United States	1.85
5	Tom Moffitt	United States	1.85
7	Neil Patterson	United States	1.83
8	Axel Hedenlund	Sweden	1.80
9	Patrick Leahy	Great Britain	1.78
10	George Barber	Canada	1.77
10	Edward Leader	Great Britain	1.77
10	Haswell Wilson	Great Britain	1.77
13	József Haluzsinsky	Hungary	1.72
13	Garfield MacDonald	Canada	1.72
13	Henry Olsen	Norway	1.72
16	Léon Dupont	Belgium	1.67
16	Folke Hellstedt	Sweden	1.67
16	Lauri Pihkala	Finland	1.67
19	Herman van Leeuwen	Netherlands	1.65
20	Alfred Bellerby	Great Britain	1.59
—	Otto Monsen	Norway	No mark
—	Lauri Wilskman	Finland	No mark

== Sources ==
- Official Report of the Games of the IV Olympiad (1908).
- De Wael, Herman. Herman's Full Olympians: "Athletics 1908". Accessed 31 March 2006. Available electronically at.
