= Frederick Harmer =

British athlete

Personal information
- Nationality: British (English)
- Born: 18 July 1884 West Ham, London, England
- Died: 7 March 1919 (aged 34) Shenfield, England

Sport
- Sport: Athletics
- Event: hurdles
- Club: Southend Harriers

Frederick William Harmer (18 July 1884 – 7 March 1919) was a British track and field athlete who competed in the 1908 Summer Olympics.

== Biography ==
Harmer, born in West Ham and educated at Brentwood School, and he and his older brother Henry Harmer both joined the newly formed Southend Harriers in 1906.

Harmer represented Great Britain at the 1908 Summer Olympics (along with his brother) in London. He was eliminated in the semi-finals of the 400 metre hurdles competition.

On 5 November 1915, Harmer was caught up in the 1915 Ilford rail crash and suffered nervous system injuries, which forced him to leave the London Scottish Territorials and take up a position at the Warley and Woolwich Barracks. He died of Spanish flu in 1919 in Shenfield.
