= Henry Harmer =

British athlete

Personal information
- Nationality: British (English)
- Born: 8 July 1883 in West Ham, London, England
- Died: 9 January 1958 (aged 74) Sidmouth, England

Sport
- Sport: Athletics
- Event: Sprints
- Club: Southend Harriers

Henry Sutton Harmer (8 July 1883 – 9 January 1958) was a British athlete who competed at the 1908 Summer Olympics.

== Biography ==
Harmer was born in West Ham and he and his younger brother Frederick Harmer both joined the newly formed Southend Harriers in 1906. Henry had significant success at the Essex County Championships, winning the 100 yards in 1906 and 1907 and the 440 yards titles in 1906, 1907 and 1908.

Harmer represented Great Britain at the 1908 Summer Olympics in the 100 metres event, Harmer did not finish in his first round heat and was eliminated from competition. His younger brother Frederick was also selected for the games to compete in the 400 metres hurdles.

Harmer had a 40-year career in shipping, which included time in Canada and served during World War II with the Canadian Red Cross. After returning to England in 1947, he lived in Devon and died in Sidmouth on 9 January 1958.

== Sources ==
- Cook, Theodore Andrea (1908). The Fourth Olympiad, Being the Official Report. London: British Olympic Association.
- De Wael, Herman (2001). "Athletics 1908". Herman's Full Olympians. Archived from the original on 27 September 2006.
- Wudarski, Pawel (1999). "Wyniki Igrzysk Olimpijskich" (in Polish). Archived from the original on 16 February 2009.
