= Edward Leader =

British hurdler (1882–1959)

Personal information
- Nationality: British (English)
- Born: 28 August 1882 Pershore, England
- Died: 22 April 1959 (aged 76) Cattistock, England

Sport
- Sport: Athletics
- Event: 110 metres hurdles
- Club: London Athletic Club; University of Cambridge AC; Achilles Club

Edward Eastlake Leader (28 August 1882 – 22 April 1959) was a British hurdler who competed at the 1908 Summer Olympics.

== Biography ==
Leader was educated at Trinity College, Cambridge. In 1904, Leader won the varsity high jump match for Cambridge against Oxford and finished second at the 1905 Oxbridge Sports.

Leader finished second behind Con Leahy in the high jump event at the 1905 AAA Championships. The following year at the 1906 AAA Championships he finished third behind Leahy again.

At the 1908 Olympic Games in London, he competed in the men's 110 metres hurdles competition, finishing second in heat 13 and the Men's high jump event, finishing in tenth place.

In 1908 he was called to the Bar and became a barrister.
