= Ted Savage (athlete) =

Canadian hurdler

Personal information
- Nationality: Canadian
- Born: 15 January 1887
- Died: 2 March 1920 (aged 33)

Sport
- Sport: Track and field
- Event: 110 metres hurdles

Ted Savage (15 January 1887 – 2 March 1920) was a Canadian hurdler. He competed in the men's 110 metres hurdles at the 1908 Summer Olympics. He also was captain of the Montreal Football Club.
