= Arthur Shaw (hurdler) =

American hurdler

Olympic medal record

Men's athletics

Representing the United States
| Bronze medal – third place | 1908 London | 110 m hurdles |

Arthur Briggs Shaw (April 28, 1886 - July 18, 1955) was an American athlete and member of the Irish American Athletic Club. He won the bronze medal in the men's 110 metres hurdles race at the 1908 Summer Olympics in London. He was a graduate of Dartmouth College.
