= Con Leahy =

Irish athlete

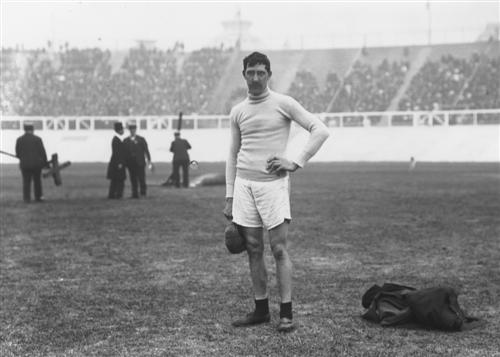
- Leahy after winning the silver in the high jump at the 1908 Games.

Personal information
- Born: 27 April 1876 Creggane, Bruree, County Limerick, Ireland
- Died: 18 December 1921 (aged 45) New York, New York, U.S.

Sport
- Sport: Track and field
- Event: High jump
Medal record
Men's athletics
Representing Great Britain
Olympic Games
Silver medal – second place	1908 London	High jump
Intercalated Games
Gold medal – first place	1906 Athens	High jump
Silver medal – second place	1906 Athens	Triple jump
- Updated on 19 May 2012

Cornelius "Con" Leahy (27 April 1876 – 18 December 1921) was an Irish athlete, who won medals at the 1906 Intercalated Games and the 1908 Olympic Games for Great Britain.

== Biography ==
Leahy was born in Creggane, outside Bruree, on the County Limerick-County Cork border, to Thomas Leahy and Mary McDonough. He was one of seven brothers, all of whom were sportsmen. His brother Patrick won the British high jump record in 1898 and went on to win Olympic medals in 1900. Another brother, Timothy, also jumped competitively.

Leahy won four consecutive British high jump title after winning the AAA Championships from the 1905 AAA Championships to the 1908 AAA Championships.

In 1906, Leahy, Peter O'Connor and John Daly, were entered for the Intercalated Games in Athens by the Irish Amateur Athletic Association (IAAA) and Gaelic Athletic Association (GAA), representing Ireland. However, the rules of the games were changed so that only athletes nominated by National Olympic Committees were eligible. Ireland did not have an Olympic Committee, and the British Olympic Council claimed the three. On registering for the Games, Leahy and his fellow-athletes found that they were listed as United Kingdom, not Irish, team members. Leahy was subsequently involved in the protest at the flag-raising ceremony for the long jump when O'Connor scaled a flagpole in the middle of the field and waved the Irish flag. Leahy won the gold medal in the high jump with 1.775 meters, beating Hungarian Lajos Gönczy by 2.5 cm. After his victory was certain, Leahy still tried to reach 1.83 meters, but he failed at this height twice. Leahy then took part in the hop, step and jump, which O'Connor won with 14.075 meters with Leahy coming second with 13.98 meters.

In the 1908 Olympic Games, Leahy again took part in the high jump. Three jumpers, Leahy, Géo André and István Somodi, shared second place with 1.88 meters behind the American Harry Porter, who won with 1.90 meters.

== Later years and death ==
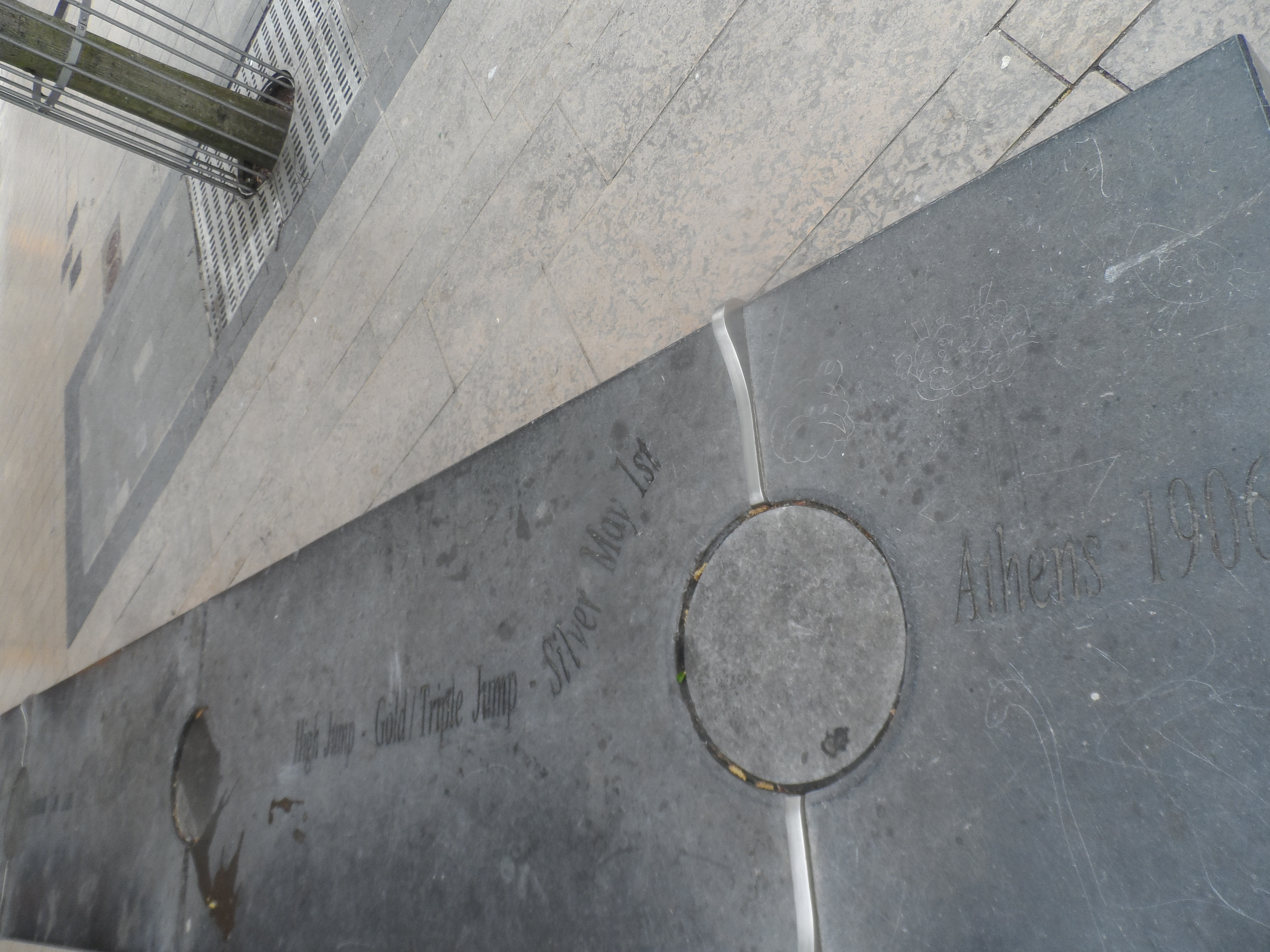
Leahy memorial in Limerick

In 1909 Con and Patrick Leahy emigrated to the United States. Con died in Manhattan in 1921. In 2006, to mark the 100th anniversary of his Olympic medal win, a memorial was unveiled in Thomas Street, Limerick.

== Record ==
- 1906: Gold medal, High jump; Silver medal, hop, step and jump (triple jump)
- 1908: Silver medal, High jump

== Sources ==
- Ian Buchanan: British Olympians, Enfield 1991 ISBN 0-85112-952-8
- Ekkehard zur Megede: The Modern Olympic Century 1896–1996 Track and Fields Athletics, Berlin 1999
