= Jimmy Tremeer =

British hurdler

Personal information
- Born: 1 August 1874 Barnstaple, England
- Died: 21 October 1951 (aged 77) Guildford, England

Sport
- Sport: Athletics
- Event: sprints / hurdles
- Club: Polytechnic Harriers
Medal record
Men's athletics
Representing Great Britain
Bronze medal – third place	1908 London	400 m hurdles

Leonard Francis Tremeer (1 August 1874 – 21 October 1951), known as Jimmy Tremeer, was an Olympic bronze medallist in the men's 400 metres hurdles at the 1908 Summer Olympics. He competed on the Great Britain and Ireland team.

== Biography ==
Treemer finished third in the 100 yards event became the at the 1897 AAA Championships. Five years later in 1902, Treemer took second place in the 220 yards event at the 1902 AAA Championships and placed third and second respectively in the 100 yards and 220 yards at the 1903 AAA Championships. Another second place finish in the 220 yards event behind Claude Jupp at the 1904 AAA Championships denied him his first AAA title.

Treemer represented Great Britain at the 1908 Summer Olympics in London. Treemer had no competition in the first round of the 400 metres hurdles, winning in a walkover. For the second round, he faced teammate G. Burton, who did not finish the race. In the final, Tremeer had to contend against two Americans who had taken turns setting new Olympic records in the first two rounds of the event. Halfway through the race, it became evident that Tremeer had no chance. He finished third in 57.0 seconds, a time that was still faster than anyone had run the race before the London Olympics.
