= Harry Coe (athlete) =

American athlete

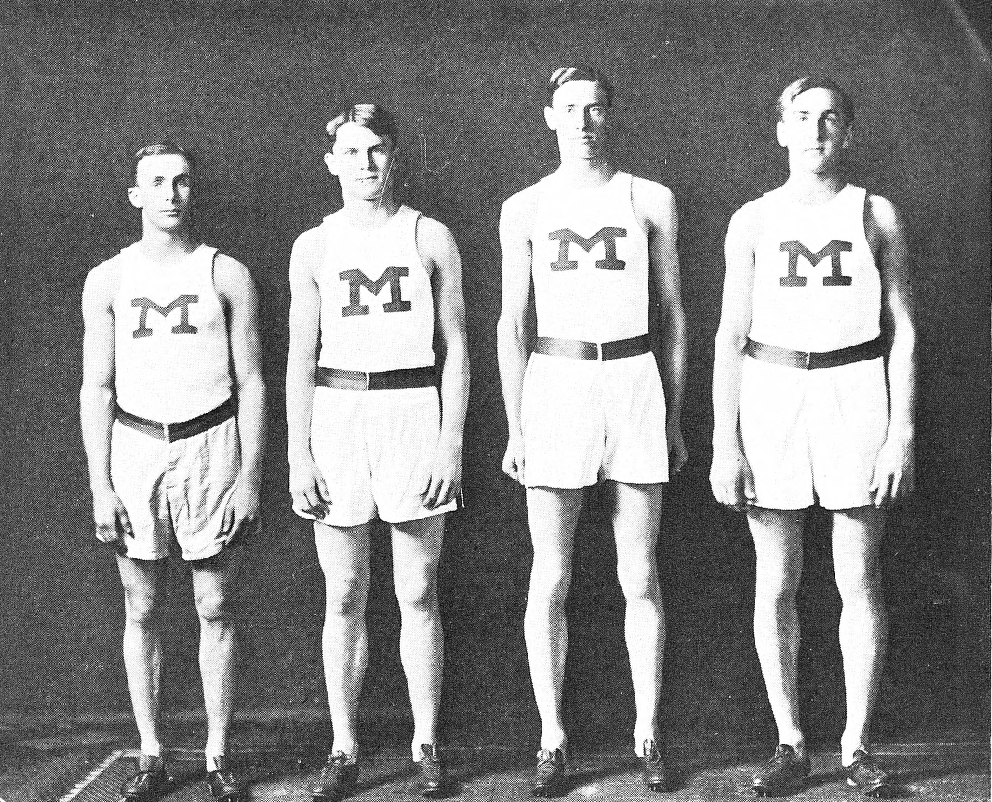
Michigan's 1907 four-mile relay team (Coe is third from left)

Harry Lee "Spider" Coe (June 25, 1885 – April 1977) was an American athlete. He competed in the 1908 Summer Olympics in London. He competed in intercollegiate track for the University of Michigan. He died in Seattle, Washington.

In 1908 he was eliminated in the semi-finals of the 400 metre hurdles competition after finishing third in his heat.

Coe placed second in his initial semifinal heat of the 1500 metres, clocking in at 4:09.2, not far behind heat winner Ernest Loney at 4:08.4. Coe did not advance to the final.

In the 800 metres, Coe finished second in his semifinal heat and did not advance to the final. He finished two yards behind eventual silver medalist Emilio Lunghi at 1:57.2.

== Sources ==
- profile
- Cook, Theodore Andrea (1908). The Fourth Olympiad, Being the Official Report. London: British Olympic Association.
- De Wael, Herman (2001). "Athletics 1908". Herman's Full Olympians. Archived from the original on 27 September 2006.
- Wudarski, Pawel (1999). "Wyniki Igrzysk Olimpijskich" (in Polish). Archived from the original on 16 February 2009.
