= Harry Porter =

Athletics competitor

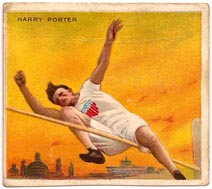

Medal record

Men's athletics

Representing the United States

Olympic Games
Gold medal – first place	1908 London	High jump

Harry Franklin Porter (August 31, 1882 in Bridgeport, Connecticut – June 27, 1965) was a high jumper from the United States of America. He was a member of the Irish American Athletic Club, and won gold in the High Jump in the 1908 Summer Olympics setting an Olympic record at mark of 6'3".

Porter was born on August 31, 1882 in Bridgeport, Connecticut and graduated from Cornell University in 1905.

According to his 1910 trading card; "it was not until after his graduation that he became imbued with the athletic spirit. In 1907 and 1908, Porter won the National Amateur Athletic Union championship indoor running high jump title, making a new record, 6ft 1½ inches, and in the latter year he won the outdoor National and Metropolitan Amateur Athletic Union championship." Porter won five United States championships, including four AAU high jump championships, from 1908 to 1911.

Porter used a modified scissors jump to set a new Olympic record of 1.905m (6 ft 3in).

Porter also helped found the Society of Industrial Engineers in 1907.

Porter was inducted into the Cornell Athletics Hall of Fame in 1987, and into the Niagara Track and Field Hall of Fame in 2010.
