= Johanna Buska =

German actress and singer

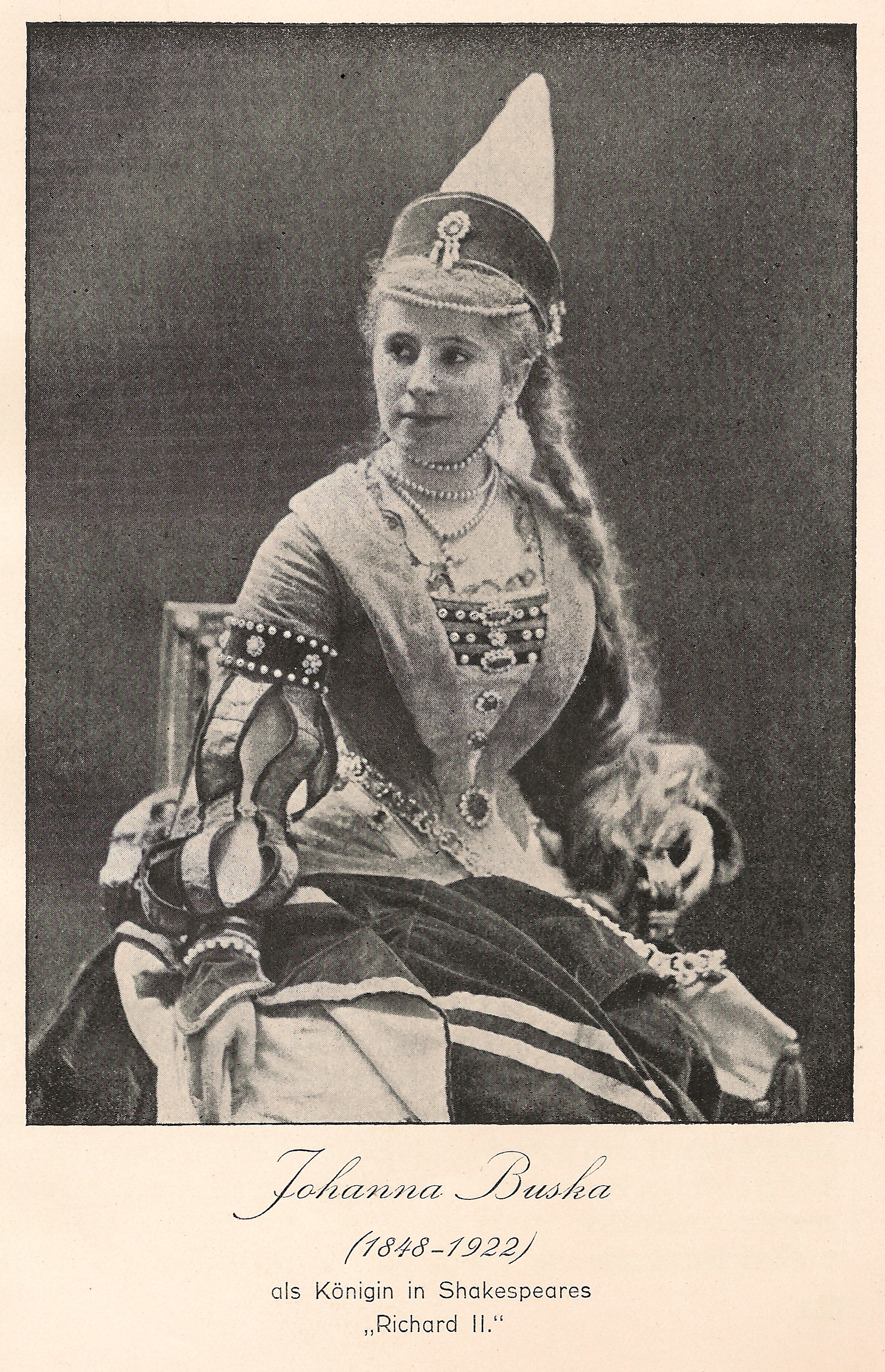
Johanna Buska (1880)

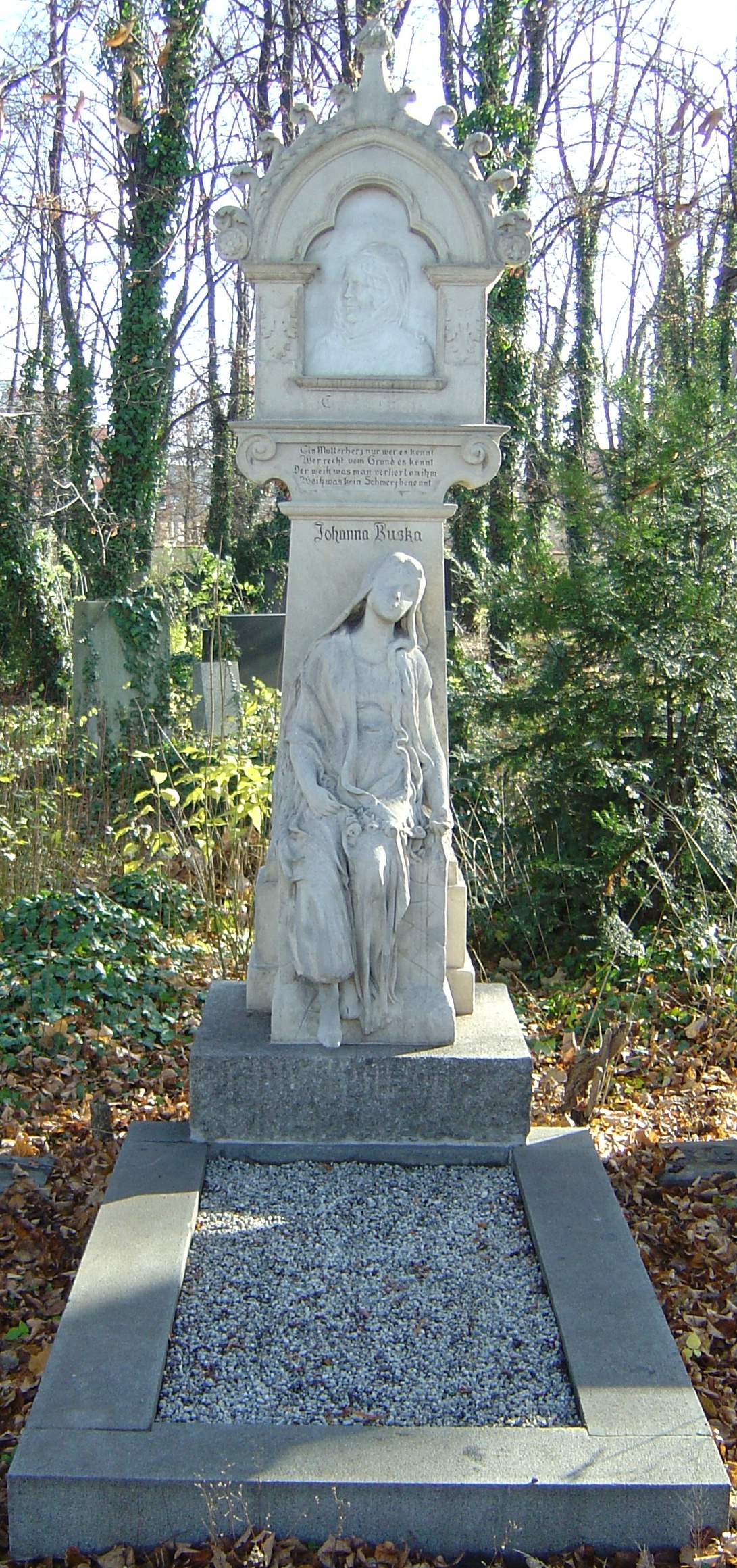
Grave of Johanna Buska and her mother at the Evangelical Cemetery in the Prague district of Strašnice

Johanna Buska (14 April 1847 or 1848 – 16 May 1922) was a German actress and opera singer.

== Life ==
Buska was born in Königsberg. After engagements at the Burgtheater and an affair with Rudolf, Crown Prince of Austria she married the Hungarian nobleman Miklós Kázmér (Nikolaus Casimir) Török de Szendrő on 20 May 1880. During the four-year marriage, a child was born, who possibly was from Rudolf. After Török's death the actress married the Prague theatre director and singer Angelo Neumann. She returned to the stage again and played among others Ibsen's Nora in Prague in 1888; at the beginning of the twentieth century she appeared in Franz von Schönthan's comedy Im bunten Rock.

Buska's first marriage inspired Theodor Fontane to write his novel Count Petöfy. In the Klassik Stiftung Weimar and art collections a letter from Buska to Julius Rodenberg is kept; in the Österreichische Nationalbibliothek there are several autographs of the actress, especially from the collection of Otto Frankfurter. In the Alfred Reucker-Archive of the Akademie der Künste are also autographs and photos by Buska from the time of Angelo Neumann's death in December 1910.

Buska died in Dresden.
