= Cecil Kinahan =

Irish athlete

Personal information
- Nationality: British/Irish
- Born: 15 April 1879 West Norwood, Lambeth, England
- Died: 15 March 1912 (aged 32)

Sport
- Sport: Athletics
- Event: hurdles
- Club: Faugh A Ballagh AC

Cecil Edward Kinahan (15 April 1879 – 15 March 1912) was a British/Irish track and field athlete who competed at the 1908 Summer Olympics.

== Biography ==
Kinahan was born in West Norwood, Greater London to Irish parents. In 1902, Kinahan was the Irish AAA champion and represented Ireland internationally but represented Great Britain at the 1908 Summer Olympics in London. At the Olympics he was eliminated in the semi-finals of the 110 metre hurdles event after finishing second in his heat.

He was commissioned a second lieutenant in the Princess Victoria's (Royal Irish Fusiliers) on 20 May 1899 and left with the 1st battalion of his regiment for South Africa after the outbreak of the Second Boer War in 1899. He took part in operations in Natal Colony, including the battles of Talana Hill and Lombard's Kop (October 1899), and was promoted to a lieutenant on 24 February 1900. From June that year, he served in the Transvaal, east of Pretoria. In October and November 1900, he served in the Orange River Colony. Following the end of the war in June 1902, he returned home with other men of his battalion on the SS Pinemore, arriving at Southampton in October that year.

Kinahan died in Sudan as part of the Egyptian army fighting the Annaks.
