= Mihály Dávid =

Hungarian shot putter

Medal record

Men's athletics

Representing Hungary

Intercalated Games
Silver medal – second place	1906 Athens	Shot put

Mihály András Dávid (31 July 1886 – 3 April 1945) was a Hungarian athlete who competed mainly in the shot put. He was born in the village of Porkerec, now Purcărete, part of Negrilești, Bistrița-Năsăud, Romania. He competed for Hungary in the 1906 Intercalated Games held in Athens in the shot put where he won the silver medal. He died in Budapest in 1945.
