= Béla Dáner =

Béla Dáner was a Hungarian athlete and politician.

== Biography ==
Béla Dáner was born on August 10, 1884, in Ozun, which at the time was part of Háromszék County in the Kingdom of Hungary, but is now located in Romania. He was educated in Brașov and at the University of Budapest.

Dáner was a standout in multiple sports during his youth. He competed for Hungary at the 1906 Olympics in artistic gymnastics. In the team event, Dáner and his countrymen finished in sixth place. Dáner also participated in the individual all-around category.

Later, Dáner qualified for the 1908 Olympics as a high jump competitor. However, he did not ultimately take part in the event.

During World War I, Dáner fought with the Royal Hungarian Honvéd. Military decorations he received include the Military Merit Cross and the Gold Medal for Bravery. Additionally, he was appointed to the Order of the Iron Crown.

From 1920 to 1922, Dáner held a seat in the National Assembly. He was elected from Hajdúszoboszló with the Christian National Union Party.

Dáner died on September 5, 1930, in Balatonmáriafürdő, Somogy County as a result of a car crash. He had previously survived an assassination attempt in 1925.
