= Max Brückner (artist) =

German artist and set designer

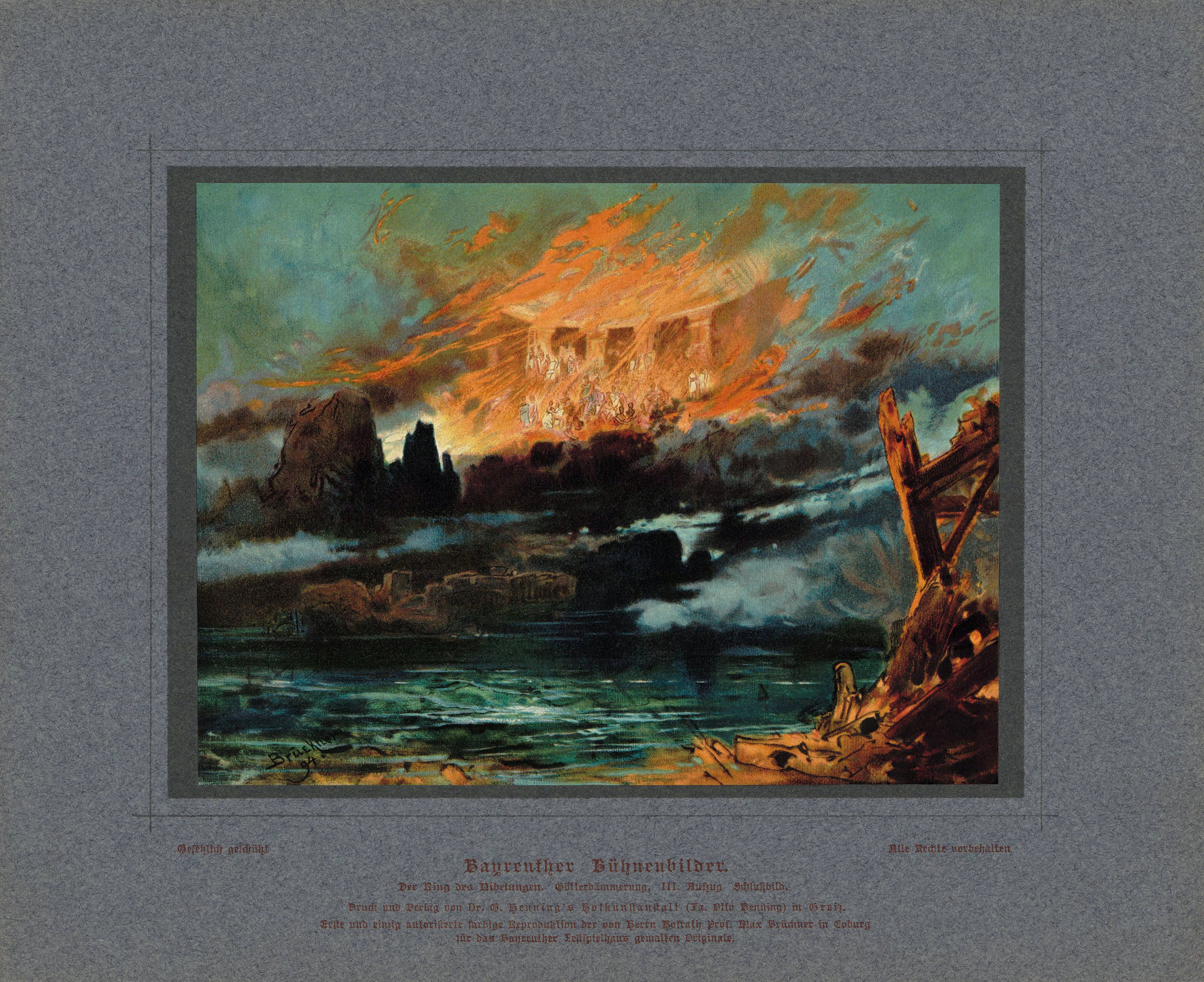
Brückner's 1894 painting for the final scene of Götterdämmerung

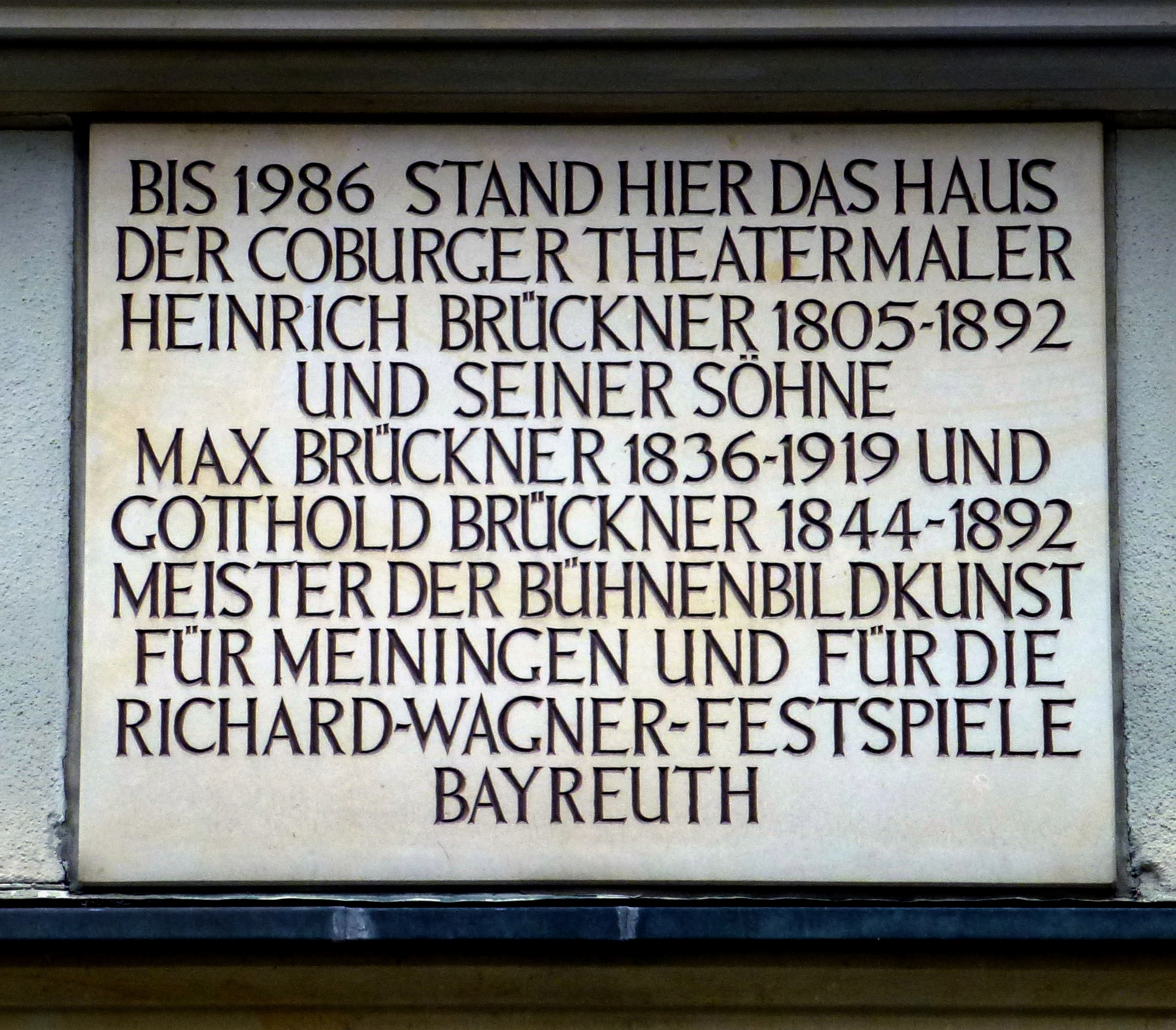
Memorial in Coburg

Heinrich Maximilian Brückner (14 March 1836 – 2 May 1919) was a German artist and set designer.

He was born in Coburg in 1836, the son of Heinrich Brückner (1805–1892), who was the theatre painter at the Hoftheater (Court Theatre) in Coburg.

In 1870, with his younger brother Gotthold Brückner (1844–1892), he founded the Brückner Brothers Studio for Scenic Stage Design, in Coburg. They created stage sets at theatres across Germany for 40 years, most significantly at Richard Wagner's Bayreuth Festival, including the original 1876 production of Der Ring des Nibelungen.
