= Nándor Kovács =

Hungarian sportsman (1881–1945)

- Born: 16 May 1881 Budapest
- Died: 4 January 1945 (aged 63)

Gymnastics career
- Discipline: Men's artistic gymnastics
- Country represented: Hungary

Nándor Kovács (May 18, 1881 – January 4, 1945) was a Hungarian track and field athlete and gymnast who competed in the 1906 Summer Olympics and in the 1908 Summer Olympics. He was born in Budapest. In 1906 he was a member of the Hungarian gymnastics team which finished sixth in the team all-around competition. He also participated in the 110 metre hurdles event but was eliminated in the first round. Two years later, he was eliminated in the semi-finals of the 400 metre hurdles competition after finishing third in his heat. He also participated in the 110 metre hurdles event but was eliminated in the first round. At the 1912 Games, he finished 26th in the Olympic long jump contest.
