= Otto Monsen =

Norwegian high jumper and speed skater

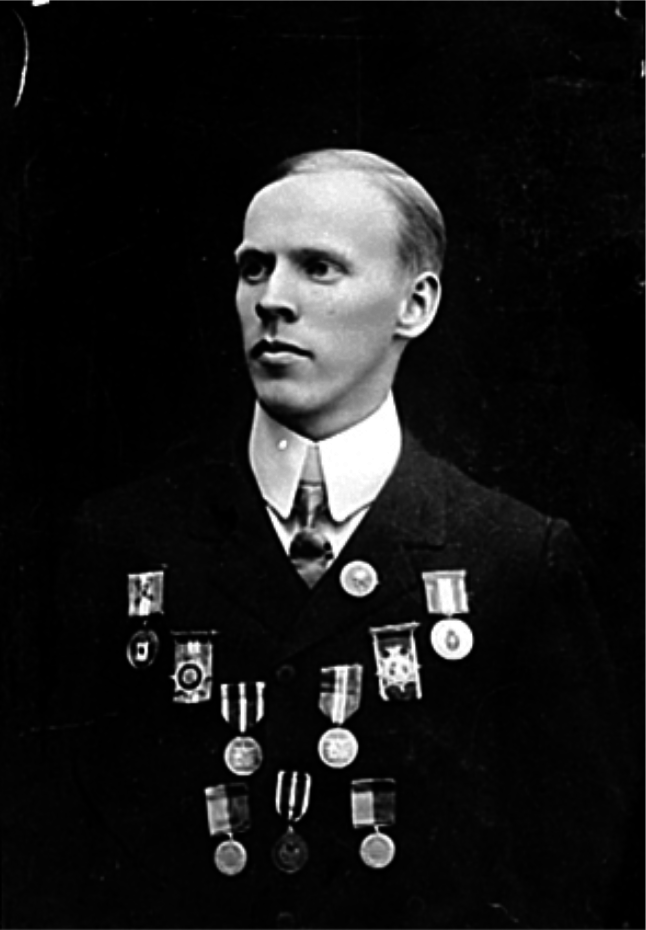
Otto Monsen

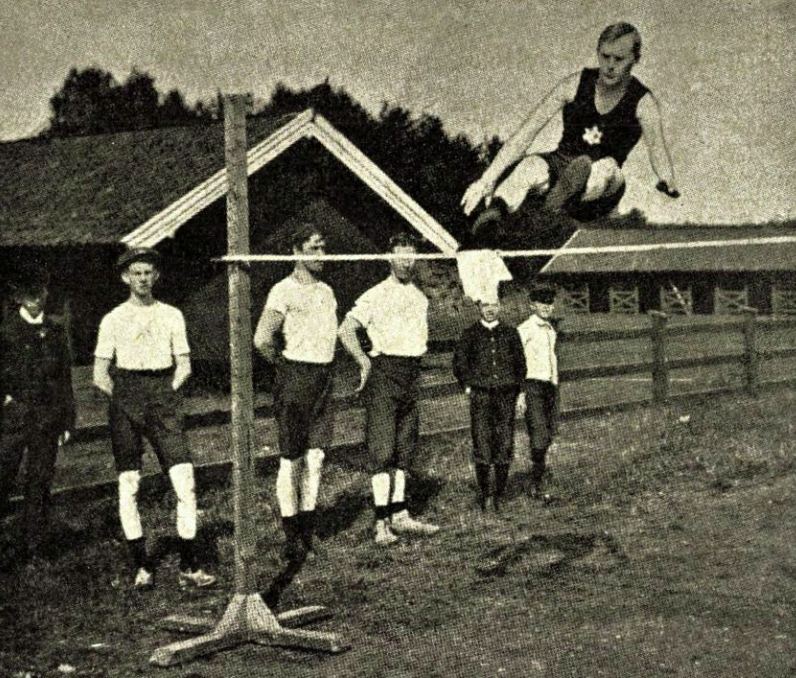
Otto does a high jump in his home town Hamar in 1908, in a 1908 Summer Olympics qualification contest.

Otto Monsen (August 19, 1887 – December 14, 1979) was a Norwegian track and field athlete who competed in the 1908 Summer Olympics and in the 1912 Summer Olympics.

In 1908 he participated in the high jump competition but failed to clear a height. Four years later he participated in the high jump competition again. He cleared 1.75 metre but did not qualify for the final. He finished tied for 13th.
