= István Somodi =

Hungarian high jumper

Olympic medal record

Men's athletics
Silver medal – second place	1908 London	High jump

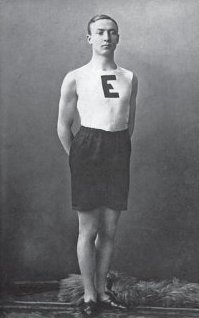
István Somodi

István Somodi (22 August 1885, Kolozsvár, Kingdom of Hungary – 8 June 1963, Cluj, Romania) was a Hungarian athlete who competed mainly in the high jump.

He competed for Hungary at the 1908 Summer Olympics, held in London, Great Britain, where he won the silver medal in the high jump.
