= Race walking at the Summer Olympics =

Racewalking at the Olympic Games
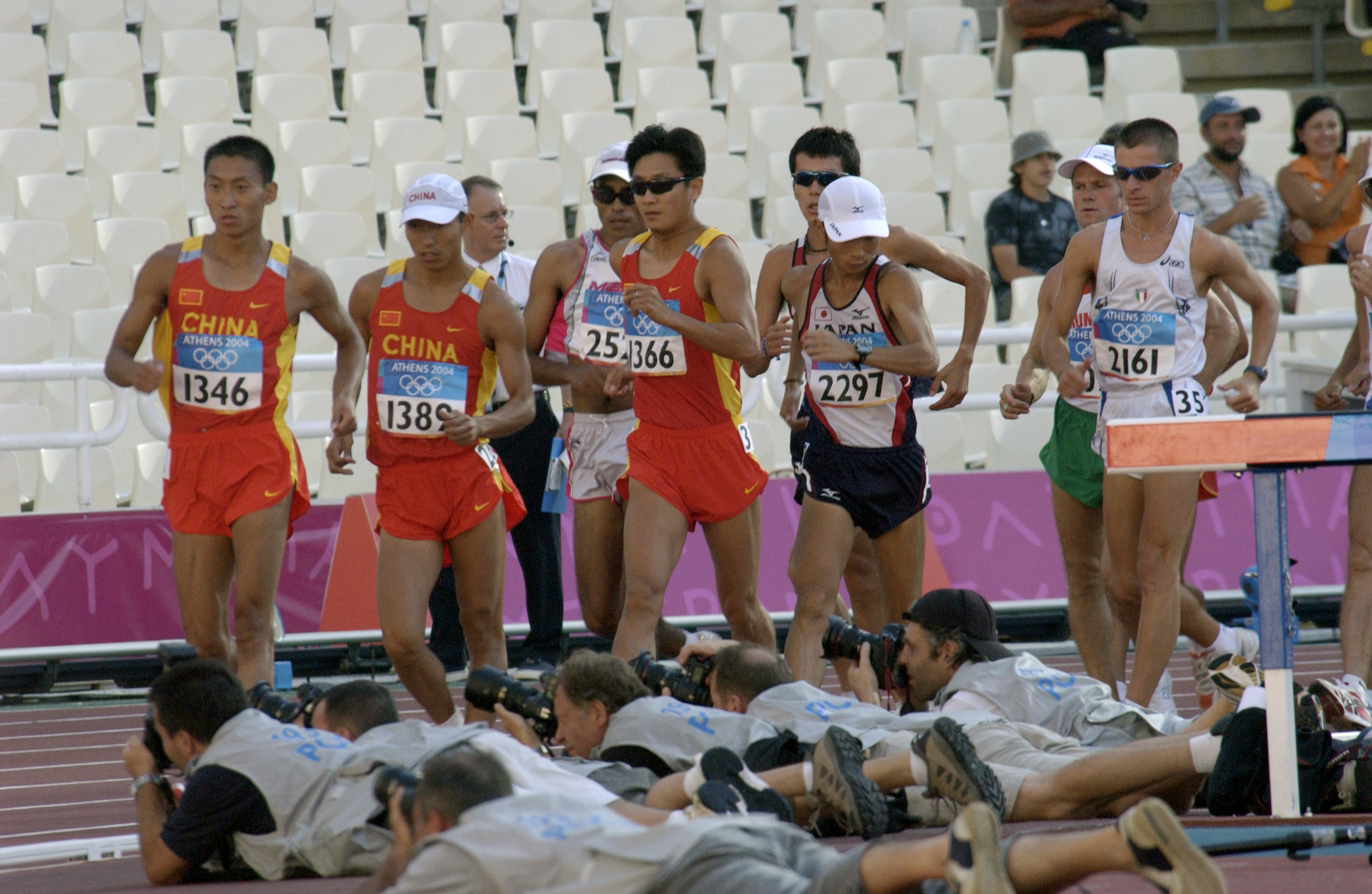
- The 2004 Olympic men's 20 km walk final

Overview
- Sport: Athletics
- Gender: Men and women
- Years held: Men 20 km: 1956 – 2024; Men 50 km: 1932 – 2020; Women 20 km: 2000 – 2024; Mixed Marathon Relay: 2024

Olympic record
- Men: 20 km 1:18:46 Chen Ding (2012); 50 km 3:36:53 Jared Tallent (2012)
- Women: 20 km 1:25:16 Qieyang Shenjie (2012)
- Mixed: Marathon Relay 2:50:31 Álvaro Martín & María Pérez (2024)

Reigning champion
- Men: 20 km Brian Pintado (ECU)
- Women: 20 km Yang Jiayu (CHN)
- Mixed: Marathon Relay Álvaro Martín & María Pérez (ESP)

Racewalking events at the Summer Olympics have been contested over a variety of distances at the multi-sport event. There were three race walking events in the 2020 Summer Olympics: a men's and a women's 20 kilometres race walk, and a men's 50 kilometres race walk. The races were held in a final-only format.

The first men's events came at the 1908 London Olympics, which featured 3500 m and 10-mile distances. A 10-Kilometer version was introduced at the 1912 Summer Olympics and it continued until 1952 (skipping three editions from 1928 to 1936). There was also a one-off 3000 m walk at the 1920 Antwerp Olympics. The men's 20 km walk became the standard short distance for men in 1956 and has continued since then. The longer men's event over 50 km was first held at the 1932 Summer Olympics and was held continuously until the 2020 Olympics, except for a brief drop from the program in 1976 – the World Athletics held a World Championship for the event in protest and it was restored.

The first women's event was introduced at the 1992 Barcelona Olympics, 84 years after the first men's race. Held over 10 km for the first two editions, the women's event was extended to match the men's 20 km distance from the 2000 Sydney Olympics onwards. Women have never commonly competed internationally over 50 km, thus it was never proposed as an Olympic event – it was the last on the Olympic athletics programme in which men competed, but women did not have an equivalent. The 50 km is also the longest distance race for an Olympic athletics event. In April 2023, a new Marathon Race Walking Mixed Relay event was announced for the 2024 Games, replacing the men's 50 km event.

The Olympic records in racewalking were all broken at the 2012 London Olympics. In the 20 km walk Chen Ding holds the men's record of 1:18:46 hours, while Elena Lashmanova held the women's mark of 1:25:02 hours until she was disqualified for doping in 2021. The men's 50 km record is 3:36:53 hours, set by Jared Tallent. Robert Korzeniowski is the most successful Olympic racewalker, having won the 50 km three times as well as the 20 km walk. Three other athletes have won four Olympic walk medals: Ugo Frigerio won three gold medals and a bronze in early competitions, Volodymyr Holubnychy won two 20 km walk titles as well as a silver and a bronze, and Jared Tallent won a gold medal in the 50 km along with two silver and a bronze.

The 1906 Intercalated Games, now not considered an official Olympic event, was the first venue for racewalking under the Olympic banner. Poor technique and judging significantly affected the 1500 m walk event, to the point where a rematch over 3000 m was added at short notice and judged by Constantine I of Greece.

Race walking has been particularly affected by doping, with many Russian world and Olympic champions testing positive for banned performance-enhancing drugs.

== Medal summary ==
=== All-Time Combined Medal Table ===
Rank	Nation	Gold	Silver	Bronze	Total
1	Italy	10	1	8	19
2	China	7	3	6	16
3	Great Britain	6	5	4	15
4	Poland	5	0	0	5
6	Soviet Union	4	5	5	14
7	Mexico	3	5	2	10
8	East Germany	3	3	4	10
9	Sweden	3	3	2	8
10	Australia	1	4	5	10
11	Spain	1	3	3	7
12	Switzerland	1	3	0	4
13	Czechoslovakia	1	1	0	2
14	West Germany	1	0	0	1
14	Slovakia	1	0	0	1
14	New Zealand	1	0	0	1
14	Greece	1	0	0	1
18	Latvia	0	2	1	2
19	Unified Team	0	2	0	2
20	United States	0	1	3	4
21	Japan	0	1	2	3
22	Germany	0	1	1	2
23	United Team of Germany	0	1	0	1
23	Guatemala	0	1	0	1
23	Brazil	0	1	0	1
23	Colombia	0	1	0	1
27	Australasia	0	0	1	1
27	Ireland	0	0	1	1
27	South Africa	0	0	1	1

=== Men's 20 km walk ===
Games	Gold	Silver	Bronze
1956 Melbourne	Leonid Spirin; Soviet Union	Antanas Mikėnas; Soviet Union	Bruno Junk; Soviet Union
1960 Rome	Volodymyr Holubnychy; Soviet Union	Noel Freeman; Australia	Stan Vickers; Great Britain
1964 Tokyo	Ken Matthews; Great Britain	Dieter Lindner; United Team of Germany	Volodymyr Holubnychy; Soviet Union
1968 Mexico City	Volodymyr Holubnychy; Soviet Union	José Pedraza; Mexico	Nikolay Smaga; Soviet Union
1972 Munich	Peter Frenkel; East Germany	Volodymyr Holubnychy; Soviet Union	Hans-Georg Reimann; East Germany
1976 Montreal	Daniel Bautista; Mexico	Hans-Georg Reimann; East Germany	Peter Frenkel; East Germany
1980 Moscow	Maurizio Damilano; Italy	Pyotr Pochynchuk; Soviet Union	Roland Wieser; East Germany
1984 Los Angeles	Ernesto Canto; Mexico	Raúl González; Mexico	Maurizio Damilano; Italy
1988 Seoul	Jozef Pribilinec; Czechoslovakia	Ronald Weigel; East Germany	Maurizio Damilano; Italy
1992 Barcelona	Daniel Plaza; Spain	Guillaume LeBlanc; Canada	Giovanni De Benedictis; Italy
1996 Atlanta	Jefferson Pérez; Ecuador	Ilya Markov; Russia	Bernardo Segura; Mexico
2000 Sydney	Robert Korzeniowski; Poland	Noé Hernández; Mexico	Vladimir Andreyev; Russia
2004 Athens	Ivano Brugnetti; Italy	Paquillo Fernández; Spain	Nathan Deakes; Australia
2008 Beijing	Valeriy Borchin; Russia	Jefferson Pérez; Ecuador	Jared Tallent; Australia
2012 London	Chen Ding; China	Érick Barrondo; Guatemala	Wang Zhen; China
2016 Rio de Janeiro	Wang Zhen; China	Cai Zelin; China	Dane Bird-Smith; Australia
2020 Tokyo	Massimo Stano; Italy	Koki Ikeda; Japan	Toshikazu Yamanishi; Japan
2024 Paris	Brian Pintado; Ecuador	Caio Bonfim; Brazil	Álvaro Martín; Spain

==== Multiple medalists ====
Rank	Athlete	Nation	Olympics	Gold	Silver	Bronze	Total
1	Volodymyr Holubnychy	Soviet Union	1960–1972	2	1	1	4
2	Jefferson Pérez	Ecuador	1996–2008	1	1	0	2
3	Maurizio Damilano	Italy	1980–1988	1	0	2	3
4	Peter Frenkel	East Germany	1972–1976	1	0	1	2
4	Wang Zhen	China	2012–2016	1	0	1	2
6	Hans-Georg Reimann	East Germany	1972–1976	0	1	1	2

==== Medals by country ====
Rank	Nation	Gold	Silver	Bronze	Total
1	Soviet Union	3	3	3	9
2	Italy	3	0	3	6
3	Mexico	2	3	1	6
4	China	2	1	1	4
5	Ecuador	2	1	0	3
6	East Germany	1	2	3	6
7	Russia	2	1	0	3
8	Spain	1	1	1	3
9	Great Britain	1	0	1	2
10	Czechoslovakia	1	0	0	1
10	Poland	1	0	0	1
12	Australia	0	1	3	4
13	Japan	0	1	1	2
14	Canada	0	1	0	1
14	United Team of Germany	0	1	0	1
14	Guatemala	0	1	0	1
14	Brazil	0	1	0	1

=== Women's 20 km walk ===
Games	Gold	Silver	Bronze
2000 Sydney	Wang Liping; China	Kjersti Plätzer; Norway	María Vasco; Spain
2004 Athens	Athanasia Tsoumeleka; Greece	Olimpiada Ivanova; Russia	Jane Saville; Australia
2008 Beijing	Olga Kaniskina; Russia	Kjersti Tysse Plätzer; Norway	Elisa Rigaudo; Italy
2012 London	Qieyang Shenjie; China	Liu Hong; China	Lü Xiuzhi; China
2016 Rio	Liu Hong; China	María Guadalupe González; Mexico	Lü Xiuzhi; China
2020 Tokyo	Antonella Palmisano; Italy	Sandra Arenas; Colombia	Liu Hong; China
2024 Paris	Yang Jiayu; China	María Pérez; Spain	Jemima Montag; Australia

==== Multiple medalists ====
Rank	Athlete	Nation	Olympics	Gold	Silver	Bronze	Total
1	Liu Hong	China	2012–2020	1	1	1	3
2	Kjersti Plätzer	Norway	2000–2008	0	2	0	2
3	Lü Xiuzhi	China	2012–2016	0	0	2	2

==== Medals by country ====
Rank	Nation	Gold	Silver	Bronze	Total
1	China	4	1	3	8
2	Russia	1	1	0	2
3	Italy	1	0	1	2
4	Greece	1	0	0	1
5	Norway	0	2	0	2
6	Spain	0	1	1	2
7	Mexico	0	1	0	1
7	Colombia	0	1	0	1
9	Australia	0	0	2	2

=== Mixed Marathon Relay ===
Games	Gold	Silver	Bronze
2024 Paris	Spain; Álvaro Martín; María Pérez	Ecuador; Glenda Morejón; Brian Pintado	Australia; Rhydian Cowley; Jemima Montag

== Defunct distances ==
=== Men's 3000 m walk ===
Games	Gold	Silver	Bronze
1920 Antwerp	Ugo Frigerio; Italy	George Parker; Australia	Richard Remer; United States

=== Men's 3500 m walk ===
Games	Gold	Silver	Bronze
1908 London	George Larner; Great Britain	Ernest Webb; Great Britain	Harry Kerr; Australasia

=== Men's 10 km ===
Games	Gold	Silver	Bronze
1912 Stockholm	George Goulding; Canada	Ernest Webb; Great Britain	Fernando Altimani; Italy
1920 Antwerp	Ugo Frigerio; Italy	Joseph Pearman; United States	Charles Gunn; Great Britain
1924 Paris	Ugo Frigerio; Italy	Gordon Goodwin; Great Britain	Cecil McMaster; South Africa
1928–1936	not included in the Olympic program		
1948 London	John Mikaelsson; Sweden	Ingemar Johansson; Sweden	Fritz Schwab; Switzerland
1952 Helsinki	John Mikaelsson; Sweden	Fritz Schwab; Switzerland	Bruno Junk; Soviet Union

=== Men's 10 miles ===
Games	Gold	Silver	Bronze
1908 London	George Larner; Great Britain	Ernest Webb; Great Britain	Edward Spencer; Great Britain

=== Men's 50 km walk ===
Games	Gold	Silver	Bronze
1932 Los Angeles	Tommy Green; Great Britain	Jānis Daliņš; Latvia	Ugo Frigerio; Italy
1936 Berlin	Harold Whitlock; Great Britain	Arthur Tell Schwab; Switzerland	Adalberts Bubenko; Latvia
1948 London	John Ljunggren; Sweden	Gaston Godel; Switzerland	Tebbs Lloyd Johnson; Great Britain
1952 Helsinki	Pino Dordoni; Italy	Josef Doležal; Czechoslovakia	Antal Róka; Hungary
1956 Melbourne	Norman Read; New Zealand	Yevgeny Maskinskov; Soviet Union	John Ljunggren; Sweden
1960 Rome	Don Thompson; Great Britain	John Ljunggren; Sweden	Abdon Pamich; Italy
1964 Tokyo	Abdon Pamich; Italy	Paul Nihill; Great Britain	Ingvar Pettersson; Sweden
1968 Mexico City	Christoph Höhne; East Germany	Antal Kiss; Hungary	Larry Young; United States
1972 Munich	Bernd Kannenberg; West Germany	Veniamin Soldatenko; Soviet Union	Larry Young; United States
1976 Montreal	not included in the Olympic program		
1980 Moscow	Hartwig Gauder; East Germany	Jordi Llopart; Spain	Yevgeniy Ivchenko; Soviet Union
1984 Los Angeles	Raúl González; Mexico	Bo Gustafsson; Sweden	Sandro Bellucci; Italy
1988 Seoul	Vyacheslav Ivanenko; Soviet Union	Ronald Weigel; East Germany	Hartwig Gauder; East Germany
1992 Barcelona	Andrey Perlov; Unified Team	Carlos Mercenario; Mexico	Ronald Weigel; Germany
1996 Atlanta	Robert Korzeniowski; Poland	Mikhail Shchennikov; Russia	Valentí Massana; Spain
2000 Sydney	Robert Korzeniowski; Poland	Aigars Fadejevs; Latvia	Joel Sánchez; Mexico
2004 Athens	Robert Korzeniowski; Poland	Denis Nizhegorodov; Russia	Aleksey Voyevodin; Russia
2008 Beijing	Alex Schwazer; Italy	Jared Tallent; Australia	Denis Nizhegorodov; Russia
2012 London	Jared Tallent; Australia	Si Tianfeng; China	Robert Heffernan; Ireland
2016 Rio de Janeiro	Matej Tóth; Slovakia	Jared Tallent; Australia	Hirooki Arai; Japan
2020 Tokyo	Dawid Tomala; Poland	Jonathan Hilbert; Germany	Evan Dunfee; Canada

==== Multiple medalists ====
Rank	Athlete	Nation	Olympics	Gold	Silver	Bronze	Total
1	Robert Korzeniowski	Poland	1996–2004	3	0	0	3
2	Jared Tallent	Australia	2008–2016	1	2	0	3
3	John Ljunggren	Sweden	1948–1960	1	1	1	3
4	Abdon Pamich	Italy	1960–1964	1	0	1	2
4	Hartwig Gauder	East Germany	1980–1988	1	0	1	2
6	Ronald Weigel	East Germany; Germany	1988–1992	0	1	1	2
6	Denis Nizhegorodov	Russia	2004–2008	0	1	1	2
8	Larry Young	United States	1968–1972	0	0	2	2

==== Medals by country ====
Rank	Nation	Gold	Silver	Bronze	Total
1	Poland	4	0	0	4
2	Great Britain	3	1	1	5
3	Italy	3	0	3	6
4	East Germany	2	1	1	4
5	Sweden	1	2	2	5
6	Soviet Union	1	2	1	4
7	Australia	1	2	0	3
8	Mexico	1	1	1	3
9	New Zealand	1	0	0	1
9	Slovakia	1	0	0	1
9	Unified Team	1	0	0	1
9	West Germany	1	0	0	1
13	Russia	0	2	2	4
14	Latvia	0	2	1	3
15	Switzerland	0	2	0	2
16	Hungary	0	1	1	2
16	Spain	0	1	1	2
18	China	0	1	0	1
18	Czechoslovakia	0	1	0	1
20	United States	0	0	2	2
21	Germany	0	1	1	2
21	Canada	0	0	1	1
21	Ireland	0	0	1	1
21	Japan	0	0	1	1

=== Women's 10 km ===
Games	Gold	Silver	Bronze
1992 Barcelona	Chen Yueling; China	Yelena Nikolayeva; Unified Team	Li Chunxiu; China
1996 Atlanta	Yelena Nikolayeva; Russia	Elisabetta Perrone; Italy	Wang Yan; China

== Intercalated Games ==
The 1906 Intercalated Games were held in Athens and at the time were officially recognised as part of the Olympic Games series, with the intention being to hold a games in Greece in two-year intervals between the internationally held Olympics. However, this plan never came to fruition and the International Olympic Committee (IOC) later decided not to recognise these games as part of the official Olympic series. Some sports historians continue to treat the results of these games as part of the Olympic canon.

Two walking events were held on the track at the 1906 Games: a men's 1500 m walk and a men's 3000 m walk. The first final to be held was the shorter distance. American George Bonhag, an absolute walking novice who had competed in the 5-mile run, came away as the winner after Canada's Don Linden, the eventual runner-up, had given basic technical advice to allow him to compete.

The 3000 m walk was held two days later as a last minute addition to the athletics programme, which was approved and also adjudicated by Constantine I of Greece after the dissatisfaction with the initial race. The entire walking field, minus Bonhag and Linden, was rearranged for the competition. Britain's Robert Wilkinson and Austria's Eugen Spiegler were again disqualified in the final stages for running, leaving Hungary's György Sztantics as the winner by a large margin.

Event	Gold	Silver	Bronze
1500 metres	George Bonhag; United States	Don Linden; Canada	Konstantinos Spetsiotis; Greece
3000 metres	György Sztantics; Hungary	Hermann Müller; Germany	Georgios Saridakis; Greece
