= 1904 AAA Championships =

Outdoor track and field competition

- Dates: 2 July 1904
- Host city: Rochdale, England
- Venue: Athletic Grounds, Rochdale
- Level: Senior
- Type: Outdoor
- Events: 16

The 1904 AAA Championships was the 1904 edition of the annual outdoor track and field competition organised by the Amateur Athletic Association (AAA). It was held on Saturday 2 July 1904 at the Athletic Grounds, Rochdale in Rochdale, England, in front of 10,000 spectators.

The Championships consisted of 16 events.

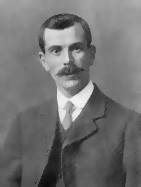
George Larner

== Results ==
Event	Gold		Silver		Bronze	
100 yards	John Morton	10.0	(United States) Arthur Duffey	inches	Claude Jupp	1 ft
220 yards	Claude Jupp	22.8	Jimmy Tremeer	6 yd	Ernest Green	8 yd
440 yards	(Scotland) Robert Watson	51.8	Edwin Montague	1 yd	E. Harrison Kenyon	1 yd
880 yards	Herbert Workman	1:59.4	Bernard Blunden	3-6 yd	E.S. Ward	6-8 yd
1 mile	Alfred Shrubb	4:22.0	(Scotland) John McGough	2 yd	George Butterfield	6-10 yd
4 miles	Alfred Shrubb	19:56.8	Josh Smith	20:51.0	George Butterfield	21:21.0
10 miles	Alfred Shrubb	54:30.4	George Butterfield	55:55.2	James Roberts	55:55.6
steeplechase	Arthur Russell	10:55.8	(Leinster) John James Daly	6 yd	Charles Straw	10 yd
120yd hurdles	(Scotland) Robert Stronach	16.0	(Wales) Wallis Walters	6-7 yd	Alfred Trafford	
2 miles walk	George Larner	13:57.6	(Leinster) George Deyermond	80-110 yd	Fred Carter	25-40 yd
7 miles walk	George Larner	52:57.4	Fred Carter		W. H. Martindale	
high jump	(Leinster) Peter O'Connor (Scotland) John Milne (Scotland) R.G. Murray	1.765	not awarded		not awarded	
pole jump	(France) André Puységur	3.20	Herbert Dickinson	3.17	(Germany) S. Morriss	2.97
long jump	(Leinster) Peter O'Connor	7.07	(Sweden) Hjalmar Mellander	6.68	(Wales) Wallis Walters	6.17
shot put	(Leinster) Denis Horgan	13.76	(Scotland) Tom Nicolson	13.00	(Scotland) Tom Kirkwood	12.77
hammer throw	(Scotland) Tom Nicolson	47.98 NR	(United States) Tom Shevlin	42.28	(Leinster) Denis Horgan	39.36
