= Australasia at the 1908 Summer Olympics =

- IOC code: ANZ

in London, United Kingdom 27 April – 31 October 1908
- Competitors: 30 in 6 sports
- Flag bearer: Henry St Aubyn Murray
- Medals Ranked 11th: Gold 1 Silver 2 Bronze 2 Total 5

Summer Olympics appearances (overview)
- 1908; 1912

Other related appearances
- Australia (1896–1904, 1920–pres.); New Zealand (1920–pres.)

Australasia was the name of a combined team from Australia and New Zealand that competed at the 1908 Summer Olympics in London, United Kingdom. It was the fourth appearance of Australia, which had not missed any edition of the Summer Olympic Games, and the first appearance of New Zealand. The two would compete together again as Australasia at the 1912 Summer Olympics before competing separately at every edition of the Summer Games since. In 1908 there were three New Zealanders, Harry Kerr, Henry Murray and Albert Rowland (a fourth New Zealander, hurdler Arthur Halligan, competed for Great Britain); all other competitors were Australian. There were 30 competitors for Australasia who competed in 20 events in six sports. A further two competitors, who were to compete in tennis, did not play as their nominations failed to reach the organisers.

The team competed under the Australian Red Ensign.

== Medallists ==
Medal	Name	Sport	Event	Date
Gold	Australia national rugby union team: John Barnett; Phil Carmichael; Daniel Carroll; Bob Craig; Thomas Griffen; Jack Hickey; Malcolm McArthur; Arthur McCabe; Patrick McCue; Chris McKivat; Charles McMurtrie; Sydney Middleton; Tom Richards; Charles Russell; Frank Smith	Rugby union		October 26
Silver	Snowy Baker (AUS)	Boxing	Middleweight	October 27
Silver	Frank Beaurepaire (AUS)	Swimming	Men's 400 m freestyle	July 16
Bronze	Harry Kerr (NZL)	Athletics	Men's 3500 m walk	July 14
Bronze	Frank Beaurepaire (AUS)	Swimming	Men's 1500 m freestyle	July 25

== Athletics ==
Track & road events

Athlete	Event	Heat		Semifinal		Final	
Athlete	Event	Time	Rank	Time	Rank	Time	Rank
Harvey Sutton	800 m	2:00.0	3	—N/a		did not advance	
Joseph Lynch	1500 m	Unknown	5	—N/a		did not advance	
Charles Swain	1500 m	did not finish		—N/a		did not advance	
George Blake	5 miles	Unknown	3	—N/a		did not advance	
Joseph Lynch	5 miles	did not finish		—N/a		did not advance	
Henry Murray	110 m hurdles	16.3	2	did not advance			
Henry Murray	400 m hurdles	59.8	2	did not advance			
Victor Aitken	Marathon	—N/a				did not finish	
George Blake	Marathon	—N/a				did not finish	
Joseph Lynch	Marathon	—N/a				did not finish	
Harry Kerr	3500 m walk	16:02.2	2 Q	—N/a		15:43.4	3rd place, bronze medalist(s)
Albert Rowland	3500 m walk	16:08.6	3 Q	—N/a		16:07.0	5
Harry Kerr	10 miles walk	1:18:40.2	3 Q	—N/a		did not start	
Albert Rowland	10 miles walk	1:21:57.6	5	—N/a		did not advance	

Field events

Athlete	Event	Final	
Athlete	Event	Distance	Position
Ernest Hutcheon	Men's standing high jump	Unknown	19-23

== Boxing ==
Athlete	Event	Round of 16	Quarterfinals	Semifinals	Final	
Athlete	Event	Opposition Result	Opposition Result	Opposition Result	Opposition Result	Rank
Snowy Baker	Middleweight	Dees (GBR); W KO	Child (GBR); W	Philo (GBR); W	Douglas (GBR); L 1-2	2nd place, silver medalist(s)

== Diving ==
Athlete	Event	Preliminary Round		Semifinal		Final	
Athlete	Event	Points	Rank	Points	Rank	Points	Rank
Snowy Baker	3 m springboard	61.3	6	did not advance			

== Rugby union ==
Australasia won the only rugby union match played in 1908 against Great Britain, earning the gold medal. Australasia was represented by the Australian rugby union tour team (now 'Wallabies').

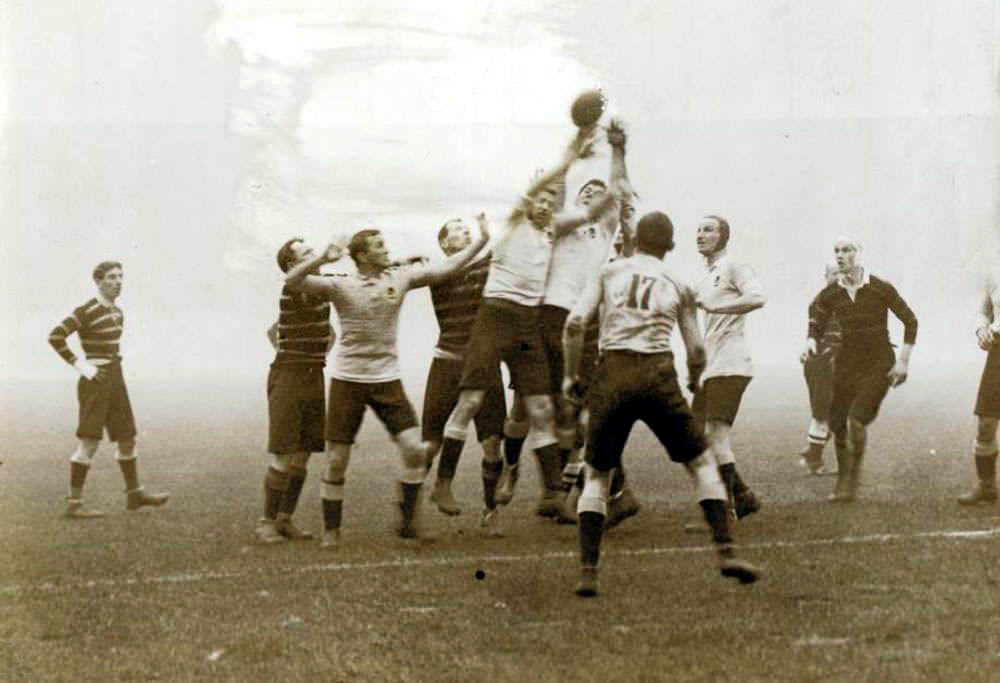
1908 Olympic Gold Final: Australasia v Great Britain

Event	Place	Players	Final
Men's rugby union	1st	Phil Carmichael, Charles Russell, Daniel Carroll, John Hickey, Francis Bede-Smith, Chris McKivat, Arthur McCabe, Thomas Griffen, John "Jumbo" Barnett, Patrick McCue, Sydney Middleton, Tom Richards, Malcolm McArthur, Charles McMurtrie, Bob Craig	Won vs. Great Britain; 32–3

== Shooting ==
Event	Place	Shooter	Score
Men's stationary target small-bore rifle	16th	William Hill	354
Men's moving target small-bore rifle	—	William Hill	Did not finish
Men's disappearing target small-bore rifle	18th	William Hill	36

== Swimming ==
Event	Place	Swimmer	Heats	Semifinals	Final
Men's 100 metre freestyle	Semi- finalist	Frank Beaurepaire	1:11.6; 1st, heat 3	Unknown; 4th, semifinal 1	Did not advance
Men's 100 metre freestyle	Heats	Theo Tartakover	Unknown; 2nd, heat 1	Did not advance	
Men's 100 metre freestyle	Heats	Edward Cooke	Unknown; 3–4, heat 6	Did not advance	
Men's 400 metre freestyle	2nd	Frank Beaurepaire	5:49.2; 1st, heat 4	5:44.0; 1st, semifinal 1	5:44.2
Men's 400 metre freestyle	Semi- finalist	Theo Tartakover	6:35.0; 1st, heat 3	Did not start —, semifinal 1	Did not advance
Men's 400 metre freestyle	Heats	Frank Springfield	5:57.4; 2nd, heat 6	Did not advance	
Men's 1500 metre freestyle	3rd	Frank Beaurepaire	23:45.8; 1st, heat 2	23:25.4; 2nd, semifinal 1	22:56.2
Men's 1500 metre freestyle	Heats	Frederick Springfield	24:52.4; 2nd, heat 4	Did not advance	
Men's 200 metre breaststroke	—	Edward Cooke	Did not finish —, heat 5	Did not advance	
Men's 4 × 200 metre freestyle relay	4th	Frank Beaurepaire; Frederick Springfield; Snowy Baker; Theo Tartakover	None held	11:35.0; 1st, semifinal 1	Unknown

== Tennis ==
Les Poidevin and Anthony Wilding (who were partners in the 1906 Davis Cup preliminary round at Newport) were nominated for the Australasian team by the Australasian Lawn Tennis Association, but their nominations failed to reach the organisers. So the pair watched the "small, impoverished and out of place" Australasian contingent alongside the "tailored splendour" of some European teams. Although many leading tennis players bypassed the Olympic tournament (which followed almost immediately after Wimbledon) and his goal had been Wimbledon, Wilding regretted the missed opportunity and endorsed his mother's summing up of the administrative bungling: "seems very careless of them & very annoying".

== Sources ==
- Cook, Theodore Andrea (1908). The Fourth Olympiad, Being the Official Report. London: British Olympic Association.
- De Wael, Herman (2001). "Top London 1908 Olympians". Herman's Full Olympians. Archived from the original on 12 July 2006.
