= Highgate Harriers =

British athletics club

- Founded: 1879
- Ground: Parliament Hill Athletics Track
- Location: Parliament Hill, London NW3 2JP, England
- Coordinates: 51°33′25″N 0°09′19″W
- Website: official website

Highgate Harriers is an Athletics club based in North London. Their home track is Parliament Hill, London Athletics track. They compete in the Southern Athletics League Division 2 East and the Metropolitan Cross Country League.

== History ==
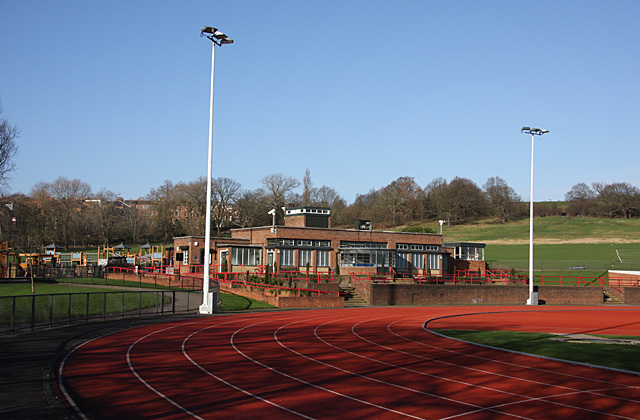
Parliament Hill Athletics Track in 2008

Highgate Harriers were founded in 1879.

In 1908, George Larner was the first Harrier to win a gold medal at the Olympic Games. Larner won the 10 miles walk event and the 3500 metres walk event at the London Olympics.

Since 2013, Highgate Harriers have hosted the Night of the 10,000 metres PBs, a track competition featuring solely 10,000 metre races. The event is usually held in mid-to-late May or early June, and since 2014, the English Championships for 10,000 metres have been incorporated into the event. From 2016, the British Athletics Championships were also held as part of the competition.

== Honours ==
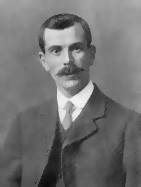
George Larner

Senior Men:

- Metropolitan Cross Country League (2013, 2014, 2015, 2016, 2017, 2018, 2019, 2020)
- Liddiard Trophy (2012, 2013, 2014, 2015, 2016)
- South of England Cross Country Championships (1997, 2012, 2016, 2017)
- South of England 6 Stage Road Relays (1990, 2015, 2017)
- National 12 Stage Road Relays (2016)

Senior Women:

- Metropolitan Cross Country League (2003, 2004, 2005, 2006, 2007, 2008, 2009, 2016, 2017)
- English National Cross Country Championships (3rd place: 2017)
- South of England Cross Country Championships (2020)

== Notable athletes ==
=== Olympians ===
Athlete	Events	Games	Medals/Ref
George Webber	3000 metres	1924	Silver medal
Michael Dineen	triple jump	1908	
Ernest Larner	3500 m walk, 10 miles walk	1908	
George Larner	3500 m walk, 10 miles walk	1908	Gold medal Gold medal
Alfred Yeoumans	3500 m walk, 10 miles walk	1908	
Charles Ruffell	1500 m, 5000, 10,000, cross country	1912	
Wilfred Nichol	100 m, 200 m, 4 × 100 m	1924	Silver medal
Herb Bignall	marathon	1928	
George Coleman	10km walk, 20km walk	1952, 1956	
Don Tunbridge	50km walk	1952	
Roy Hollingsworth	discus	1964	
Wendy Hoyte	4 × 100 m relay	1976, 1980	
Keith Cullen	3000 m steeplechase, marathon	1996, 2000	
Peter Nowill	3000 metre steeplechase	2004	
Simeon Williamson	100 metres, 4 × 100 m relay	2008	

== Club kit ==
The men compete in a vest with hooped black and white horizontal stripes, with the word Highgate on the chest. Women wear a vest with a black upper half and a white lower half, also with the word Highgate, in white lettering on the upper half.

== Night of the 10,000 metres PBs winners ==
Key: Course record

Edition	Date	Men's Event Winner	Time (m:s)	Women's Event Winner	Time (m:s)	Ref
1	6 June 2013	Eddie McGinley (IRL)	29:53.37	-		
2	10 May 2014	Andy Vernon (GBR)	28:26.59	Jo Pavey (GBR)	32:11.04	
3	16 May 2015	Jonathan Mellor (GBR)	28:46.80	Rhona Auckland (GBR)	32:28.32	
4	21 May 2016	Ross Millington (GBR)	28:28.20	Jess Andrews (GBR)	31:58.00	
5	20 May 2017	Andy Vernon (GBR)	28:21.15	Beth Potter (GBR)	32:04.63	
6	19 May 2018	Richard Ringer (GER)	27:36.52	Lonah Chemtai Salpeter (ISR)	31:33.03	
7	6 July 2019	Yemaneberhan Crippa (ITA)	27:49.79	Stephanie Twell (GBR)	31:44.79	
8	14 May 2022	Yemaneberhan Crippa (ITA)	27:16.18	Jessica Judd (GBR)	31:22.24	
9	20 May 2023	Paul Chelimo (USA)	27:12.73	Mizan Alem (ETH)	29:59.03	
10	18 May 2024	Mohamed Ismail (DJI)	27:22.38	Megan Keith (GBR)	31:03.02	
