= Ralph Harrison (athlete) =

British athlete

Personal information
- Nationality: British (English)
- Born: Q1, 1885 Cullercoats, Northumberland, England
- Died: December 1966 (agd 81) Whitley Bay, Northumberland, England

Sport
- Sport: Athletics
- Event: Racewalking
- Club: North Shields Walking Club

Ralph Harrison (Q1 1885 – December 1966) was a British racewalker who competed at the 1908 Summer Olympics.

== Biography ==
Harrison was born in Cullercoats, Northumberland, England, the son of a self-employed Northumberland fisherman. He was a member of the North Shields Walking Club and by trade he was a grocer's assistant.

Harrison finished third behind Alfred Yeoumans in the 2 miles walk event at the 1906 AAA Championships but the following year he became the British 2 miles walk champion after winning the British AAA Championships title at the 1907 AAA Championships.

In 1908, he finished third behind George Larner, and secured a place at the Olympics. Harrison represented the Great Britain team at the 1908 Olympic Games in London, where he participated in the men's 3500 metres walk. In his heat he finished second behind Canadian George Goulding and progressed to the Olympic final but was disqualified during the final for violations on the second lap. Just two days later he was due to participate in the men's 10 miles walk event but despite reaching the 3.5km final was unable to secure time away from his work and did not start the event.

In 1921 he was working at Brough and Sons Wholesale Grocers in Chester-le-Street.
