= Bill Brown (race walker) =

British racewalker

Personal information
- Nationality: British (English)
- Born: 17 December 1878
- Died: 25 August 1980 (aged 101) Westcliff-on-Sea, England

Sport
- Sport: Athletics
- Event: Racewalking
- Club: Surrey Walking Club

William C. Brown also known as Bill Brown (17 December 1878 – 25 August 1980) was a British racewalker who competed at the 1908 Summer Olympics.

== Biography ==
Brown finished eighth in the two-mile walk event at the 1908 AAA Championships, which saw him representing Great Britain at the 1908 Summer Olympics in London. He competed in the men's 3500 metres walk being disqualified in heat one and taking no further part.

The following year in 1909 he set British records over various long distances ranging from 51 to 85 miles. He was a founder member of the Centurion Club, which celebrated racewalkers who had completed 100 miles in 24 hours. By trade he worked for the Ford Motor Company in Dagenham.

== See also ==
- List of centenarians (sportspeople)
