= 1906 AAA Championships =

Outdoor track and field competition

- Dates: 7 July 1906
- Host city: London, England
- Venue: Stamford Bridge (stadium)
- Level: Senior
- Type: Outdoor
- Events: 16

The 1906 AAA Championships was the 1906 edition of the annual outdoor track and field competition organised by the Amateur Athletic Association (AAA). It was held on Saturday 7 July 1906 at the Stamford Bridge (stadium) in London, England.

The Championships consisted of 16 events.

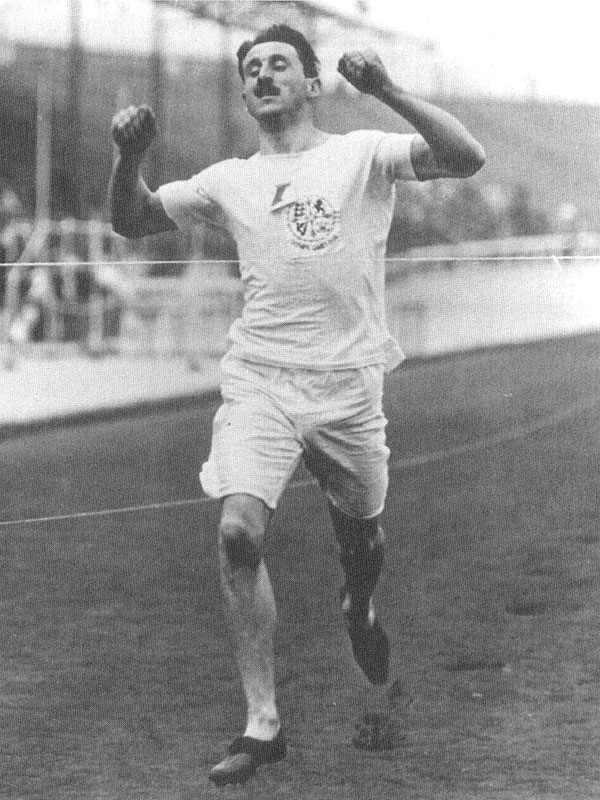
Wyndham Halswelle successfully defended his 440 yards title

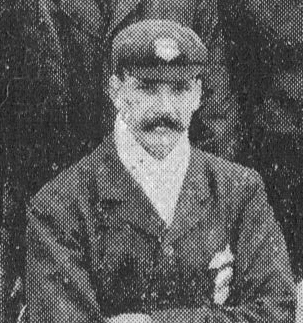
While on tour with the West Indies cricket team, Bertie Harragin won the pole jump event

== Results ==
Event	Gold		Silver		Bronze	
100 yards	John Morton	10.4	(Leinster) Denis Murray	1½ yd	(Scotland) Wyndham Halswelle	1 ft
220 yards	Claude Jupp	22.6	Henry Pankhurst	4 yd	Arthur Hargreaves	½ yd
440 yards	(Scotland) Wyndham Halswelle	48.8	John George	8-10 yd	John Densham	4 yd
880 yards	Arthur Astley	1:57.8	J. Woolley	2-4 yd	James Lintott	5-8 yd
1 mile	George Butterfield	4:18.4	(Scotland) John McGough	4:19.2	Jack Lee	4:22.6
4 miles	Frederick Hulford	20:27.4	James Roberts	20 yd	A. W. Shee	
10 miles	Albert Aldridge	54:07.2	James Beale	54:15.0	Leslie Pearce	55:06.0
steeplechase	Arthur Russell	11:14.8	George Wigginton	11:37.4	Guy Holdaway	80-100 yd
120yd hurdles	(Scotland) Robert Stronach	16.6	Oswald Groenings	inches	Eric Hussey	inches
2 miles walk	(Wales) Alfred Yeoumans	14:20.4	Frank Creasey	50-80 yd	Ralph Harrison	6-12 yd
7 miles walk	Fred Carter	53:20.2	Frederick Thompson	53:43.0	W. H. Martindale	54:19.0
high jump	(Leinster) Con Leahy	1.829	Oswald Groenings	1.753	Edward Leader; Cyril Dugmore	1.676; 1.676
pole jump	Bertie Harragin	3.15	not awarded		only 1 competitor	
long jump	(Leinster) Peter O'Connor	7.15	(Canada) John Hagerman	6.92	Lionel Cornish	6.85
shot put	(Scotland) Tom Kirkwood	13.83 NR	Henry Alan Leeke	12.05	Arthur Sale	11.07
hammer throw	Henry Alan Leeke	37.52	(Scotland) Tom Kirkwood	36.52	Alf Flaxman	36.18
