= Ernest Larner =

British racewalker

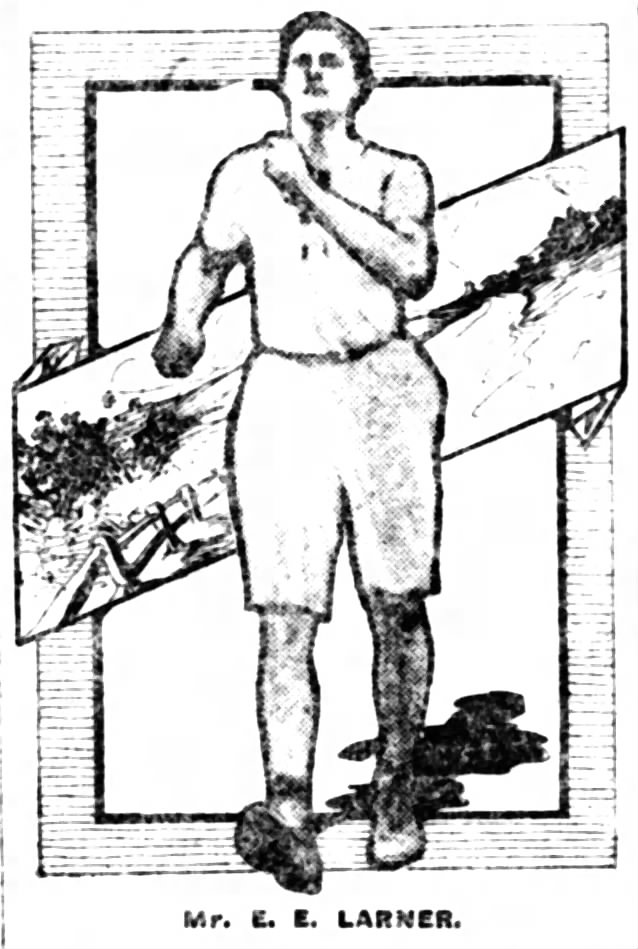

Personal information
- Nationality: British (English)
- Born: 25 June 1880 Hammersmith, London, England
- Died: 21 June 1963 (aged 82) Amersham, England

Sport
- Sport: Athletics
- Event: Racewalking
- Club: Highgate Harriers

Ernest Edward Larner (25 June 1880 – 21 June 1963), also known as Erik Larner or E. E. Larner, was a British racewalker who competed at the 1908 Summer Olympics.

== Biography ==
Larner was born in Hammersmith, London, to a plasterer from London. Prior to the 1908 Olympics, Larner won the Inter-Metropolitan Borough Officers' Walk and the 1906 London Municipal Officers 4-mile walk. Larner placed 4th at the 1908 AAA Championships 7-mile walk.

Larner represented Great Britain at the 1908 Summer Olympics in London. He competed in the men's 3500 metres walk and 10 miles walk events. In the 3500 m walk, he placed 4th in his heat and failed to qualify for the finals by less than two seconds. In the 10 miles however, Larner advanced to the finals and placed 5th overall in a time of 1:24:26.2 hours.

He later became a librarian at Shepherd's Bush and served in the Royal Army Medical Corps during World War I. He was a member of the Highgate Harriers and Middlesex Walking Clubs.
