= Wallis Walters =

British athlete

Personal information
- Nationality: British (Welsh)
- Born: 2 January 1878 Llanllawddog, Carmarthenshire, Wales
- Died: 10 February 1952 (aged 74) Llanybydder, Wales

Sport
- Sport: Track and field
- Event: 110 metres hurdles/long jump
- Club: Cardiff University AC

David Wallis Walters (2 January 1878 – 10 February 1952) was a British and Welsh hurdler and long jumper who competed at the 1908 Summer Olympics.

== Biography ==
Walters was the 1904 British long jump champion by virtue of finishing third (the highest British athlete) at the 1904 AAA Championships. He also finished runner-up to Bert Stronach at both the 1904 and 1905 AAA Championships.

Walters represented Great Britain at the 1908 Summer Olympics in London, where he competed in the men's 110 metres hurdles competition.
