= Herne Hill Harriers =

British athletics club

- Founded: 1889
- Ground: Tooting Bec Athletics Track
- Location: Tooting Bec Rd, London SW17 8AR, England
- Coordinates: 51°25′47″N 0°08′49″W
- Website: official website

The Herne Hill Harriers is an amateur athletics sports club based at Tooting Bec Athletics Track in Tooting Bec, London. The club caters to all levels and ages of track, field, road running and cross-country running and begins training athletes at age 11 and offers “Star Track” an opportunity for younger children to get involved at the end of July each year.

== History ==
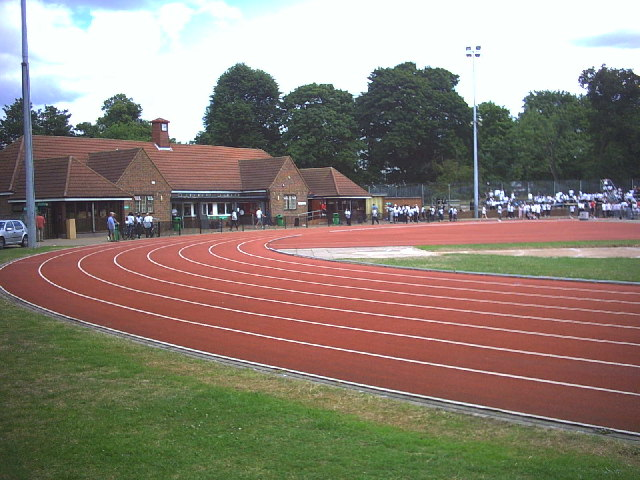
Tooting Bec Athletics Track in 2010

The club was founded in the Herne Hill district of London in 1889 and completed their first handicap event in 1890.

Joe Deakin won the club's first Olympic Gold medal at the 1908 Summer Olympics in London.

In 2026, the club won the women's team and individual event (Lucy Jones) at the English National Cross Country Championships.

== Leagues ==
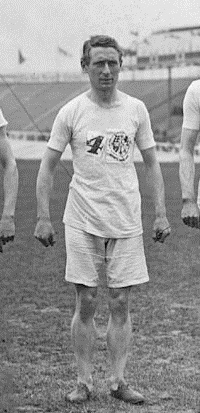
Joe Deakin

Herne Hill Harriers athletes are involved in a number of different leagues and competitions. The men's track and field team competes in the second and third division of the Southern men's league as well as the Rosenheim league involving other local clubs. The women's track and field team competes in the UK women's athletics league while younger athletes compete as a part of the National young athletes league as well as the Ebbisham and Lily B Leagues.

The club's cross-country athletes compete in the Surrey and East Surrey Cross Country Leagues each season as well as the South of Thames, Surrey, South of England and National Cross Country championships Road Runners at Herne Hill Harriers compete annually in the Surrey, South of England and National 6-stage Road relays in the autumn and in the longer 12-stage road relays in the spring as well as participating in the Surrey Road League over the summer months

== Major honours ==
- English National Cross Country Championships winners; 2026

== Notable athletes ==
Former Olympians and European champions in athletics have run for the club including Olympic medalists Joe Deakin, David Jacobs, Herbert Johnston, Ernest Webb and Thomas Humphreys, as well as Harry Green, another Olympian who held a world best in the marathon, as well as Michael Maynard, part of the historic England Team that took gold at the 1957 International Cross Country Championships in San Sebastián, Spain.

=== Olympians ===
Athlete	Events	Games	Medals/Ref
Ernie Webb	3,500m walk, 10 miles walk	1908, 1912	Silver medal Silver medal Silver medal
Fred Appleby	marathon	1908	
Geoffrey Burton	400m hurdles	1908	
Joe Deakin	3 Miles Team Race	1908	Gold medal
Bill Palmer	3,500m walk, 10 miles walk	1908, 1912	
Albert Rowland	3,500m walk, 10 miles walk	1908	
Harry Green	marathon	1912	
Ernest Haley	200m, 400m	1912	
Albert Hare	1500m	1912	
Thomas Humphreys	10,000m, crosscountry	1912	Bronze medal
David Jacobs	100m, 200m 4×100m relay	1912	Gold medal
Tim Kellaway	marathon	1912	
Edgar Lloyd	marathon	1912	
Algernon Wells	200m, 400m	1912	
Herbert Johnston	5000m, 3,000m team race	1924, 1928	Silver medal
Donald Chapman	4x400m relay (ns)	1928	
William Craner	4x400m relay	1928	
Terry Higgins	400m, 4x400m relay	1948, 1952	
Ian Boyd	1500m	1956	
Ron Clark	marathon	1956	
John Howell	long jump	1960	
Laurie Taitt	110m hurdles	1964	
Jade Johnson	long jump	2004, 2008	
Franka Magali	100m	2008	
Katie Snowden	1500m	2020	

=== Commonwealth Games ===
Athlete	Events	Games	Medals/Ref
Bob Setti	4 x 440y	1962	Silver medal
Sheikh Omar Faye	High Jump	1970	Bronze medal

=== Other ===
- European Cross Country Championships: Benedict Whitby (silver) 10,000m Team Race Dublin 2009, David Taylor (bronze) 9,000m Team Race Alnwick, Northumberland 1995
- European Masters Athletics Championship: Stuart Thurgood (gold) - Weight Throw - Ismir, Turkey - 2014 (silver) - M40 Hammer Throw - Aarhus, Denmark - 2017
- European Under 20 Championships: Olivia Hines (gold)- 4 × 400 m (1st leg) - Grosseto - 2001
- European Junior Championship: Uvie Ugono (gold) 4 × 100 m, Ljublijana 1997, John Boggis (silver) 3,000m Paris 1970

All medals won for Great Britain/England unless stated otherwise.

== Kit ==
The club vest consists of a crop top or vest with red and black horizontal stripes, with black shorts.
