= Albert Rowland =

New Zealand racewalker

Personal information
- Born: Albert Edward Mackay Rowland; 26 October 1885 Christchurch, New Zealand
- Died: 23 July 1918 (aged 32) Marne, France
- Resting place: Marfaux British Cemetery, Marne, France
- Occupation: Optician
- Height: 1.74 m (5 ft 8 1/2 in)
- Weight: 66 kg (146 lb)
- Spouse: Agnes Ludlow Fraser (m. 1911)
- Military career
- Allegiance: New Zealand
- Branch: New Zealand Rifle Brigade
- Service years: 1916–18
- Rank: Second lieutenant

Sport
- Country: New Zealand
- Sport: Track and field

Achievements and titles
- National finals: 1-mile track walk champion (1907); 3-mile track walk champion (1907)

Albert Edward Mackay Rowland (26 October 1885 – 23 July 1918) was a New Zealand athlete who competed in walking events. He competed for Australasia in two walking events at the 1908 Summer Olympics in London.

== Early life and family ==
Born in Christchurch on 26 October 1885, Rowland was the son of Edward Anthony Rowland and Anne Rowland (née Macdonald). He married Agnes Ludlow "Jo" Fraser on 28 October 1911 at Holy Trinity Church in the Christchurch suburb of Avonside, and they went on to have one daughter.

== Athletics ==
A race walker, Rowland won both the 1-mile and 3-mile track walk titles at the New Zealand National Athletics Championships in 1907.

He represented Australasia at the 1908 Olympic Games in London. He finished fifth in the final of the 3500 metres walk behind teammate and fellow New Zealander, Harry Kerr, who won the bronze medal. He also competed in the 10-miles walk, finishing fifth in his heat and not progressing to the final.

Rowland finished second behind Ernest Webb in the 2 miles walk event at the British 1909 AAA Championships.

== World War I ==
Rowland was working on his own account as an optician in Wellington when he enlisted in the New Zealand Expeditionary Force in July 1916. He travelled to Britain with the 21st Reinforcements on the Waitemata, arriving in Plymouth on 27 March 1917. On the voyage, Rowland was one of the editors of the onboard magazine, the Waitemata Wobbler. He was commissioned as a second lieutenant in the New Zealand Rifle Brigade on 30 April 1918. He was attached to the New Zealand Cyclist Battalion when he was killed in the Second Battle of the Marne on 23 July 1918. He was buried in the Marfaux British Cemetery.

== See also ==
- List of Olympians killed in World War I
