= Lintott =

Lintott is a surname. Notable people with the surname include:

- Barnaby Bernard Lintot or Lintott (1675–1736), English publisher
- Evelyn Lintott (1883–1916), English footballer
- James Lintott (1886–1963), British Olympic athlete
- Andrew Lintott (born 1936), British classical scholar
- Graham Lintott (born 1955), Chief of the Royal New Zealand Air Force
- Chris Lintott (born 1980), English astrophysicist, for whom is named:
  - 4937 Lintott, a minor planet
