= 1908 AAA Championships =

Outdoor track and field competition

- Dates: 4 July 1908
- Host city: London, England
- Venue: White City Stadium
- Level: Senior
- Type: Outdoor
- Events: 16

The 1908 AAA Championships was the 1908 edition of the annual outdoor track and field competition organised by the Amateur Athletic Association (AAA). It was held on Saturday 4 July 1908 at the White City Stadium in London, England. The attendance was 22,000 and included Prince Albert of Wales (later George VI).

The Championships consisted of 16 events.

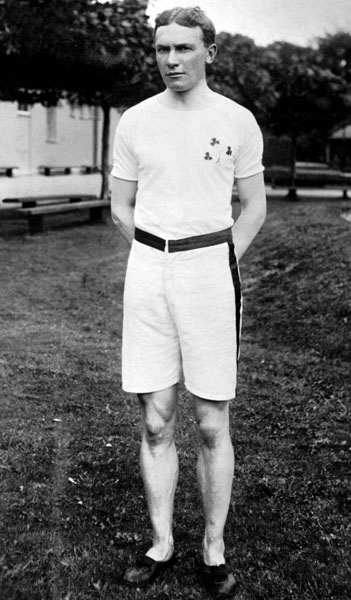
Canadian Robert Kerr completed a sprint double

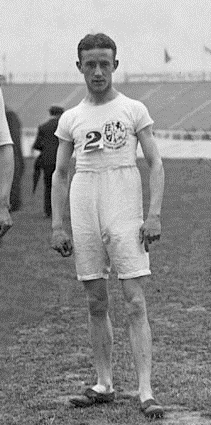
Harold Wilson was the mile champion

== Results ==
Event	Gold		Silver		Bronze	
100 yards	(Canada) Robert Kerr	10.0	(South Africa) Reginald Walker	1 yd	John Morton	inches
220 yards	(Canada) Robert Kerr	22.4	Lionel Reed	5 yd	John George	1 yd
440 yards	(Scotland) Wyndham Halswelle	49.4	Edwin Montague; Edward Ryle	5 yd 5 yd	not awarded	
880 yards	Theodore Just	1:58.2	Ivo Fairbairn-Crawford	8-10 yd	J. W. Monument	5 yd
1 mile	Harold Wilson	4:20.2	Joe Deakin	10 yd	Francis Knott	2-4 yd
4 miles	Emil Voigt	19:47.4	Arthur Robertson	19:52.8	A. Edward Wood	19:53.6
10 miles	(Scotland) Alexander Duncan	53:40.6	Joe Deakin	53:41.4	(Scotland) Thomas Jack	53:42.0
steeplechase	Reginald Noakes	10:35.0	Arthur Russell	5-10 yd	Billy Grantham	5-30 yd
120yd hurdles	(South Africa) John Duncker	16.2	Oswald Groenings	½ yd	(New Zealand) Henry Murray	1 ft-2 yd
2 miles walk	George Larner	13:58.4	Ernest Webb	14:05.6	Ralph Harrison	14:14.6
7 miles walk	Ernest Webb	53:02.6	Fred Carter	53:43.0	William Palmer	54:25.0
high jump	(Leinster) Con Leahy	1.803	(Sweden) Axel Hedenlund	1.778	Oswald Groenings; Walter Henderson	1.753
pole jump	(Canada) Ed Archibald	3.66	(Sweden) Bruno Söderström	3.60	(Belgium) Alexandre de Petrofsky (Sweden) Carl Silfverstrand	3.05; 3.05
long jump	(Scotland) Wilfred Bleaden	6.79	(Leinster) Denis Murray	6.61	John Pattison	6.45
shot put	(Leinster) Denis Horgan	13.59	(Scotland) Tom Kirkwood	13.40	(Sweden) Hugo Wieslander	12.15
hammer throw	(United States) Simon Gillis	50.12	(Leinster) Denis Horgan	40.00	(Scotland) Robert Lindsay-Watson	33.79
