= William Palmer (athlete) =

British racewalker

Bill Palmer
Personal information
- Nationality: British (English)
- Born: 19 April 1882 Windsor, England
- Died: 21 December 1967 (aged 85) Hendon, England

Sport
- Sport: Athletics
- Event: long-distance
- Club: Herne Hill Harriers

William James Palmer also known as Bill Palmer (19 April 1882 – 21 December 1967) was a British track and field athlete who competed in the 1908 Summer Olympics and in the 1912 Summer Olympics.

== Biography ==
Palmer was born in Windsor, Berkshire.

Palmer finished third behind Ernest Webb in the 7 miles walk event at the 1908 AAA Championships.

Shortly after the AAAs, Palmer represented Great Britain at the 1908 Summer Olympics in London. At the games, he finished sixth in the 10 mile walk event. He also participated in the final of the 3500 metre walk competition but did not finish the race.

Four years later at the 1912 Olympic Games in Stockholm, he participated in the final of the 10 kilometre walk competition but did not finish the race again.

After retiring from competition, he served as President of Herne Hill Harriers. Later in 1948, he was a walking judge at the second London Olympic Games.
