= Herbert Bignall =

British long-distance runner

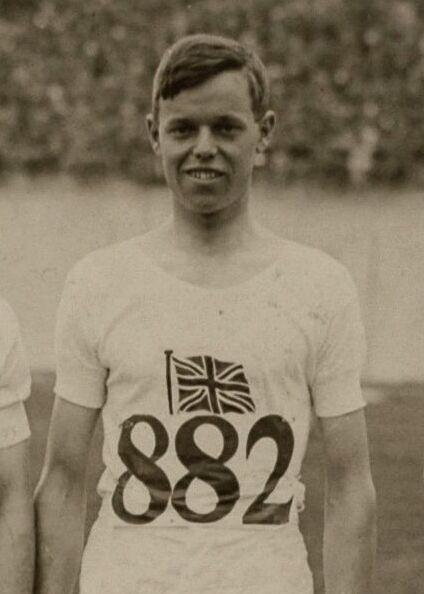
- Bignall at the 1928 Summer Olympics

Personal information
- Nationality: British
- Born: 28 January 1906 Reigate, Surrey
- Died: 30 October 1989 (aged 83) Redhill, Surrey

Sport
- Sport: Long-distance running
- Event: Marathon
- Club: Highgate Harriers

Herbert James Bignall (28 January 1906 – 30 October 1989) was a British long-distance runner. He competed in the marathon at the 1928 Summer Olympics. He also competed in the marathon at the 1930 British Empire Games for England and was a carpenter by trade. He was a torchbearer for the 1948 Summer Olympics torch relay, carrying the flame from Nutfield Police Station to the Warwick Hotel, Redhill.

Bignall was a founder of the Rothery Athletic Club, which later became known as the Redhill and Reigate Athletics Club. He was a member of the Highgate Harriers and served as President of the Surrey Amateur Athletics Association.

Bignall and his wife, Betty, had a son and three daughters.
