= Emmerich Rath =

Czech sportsman (1883–1962)

Emerich Rath
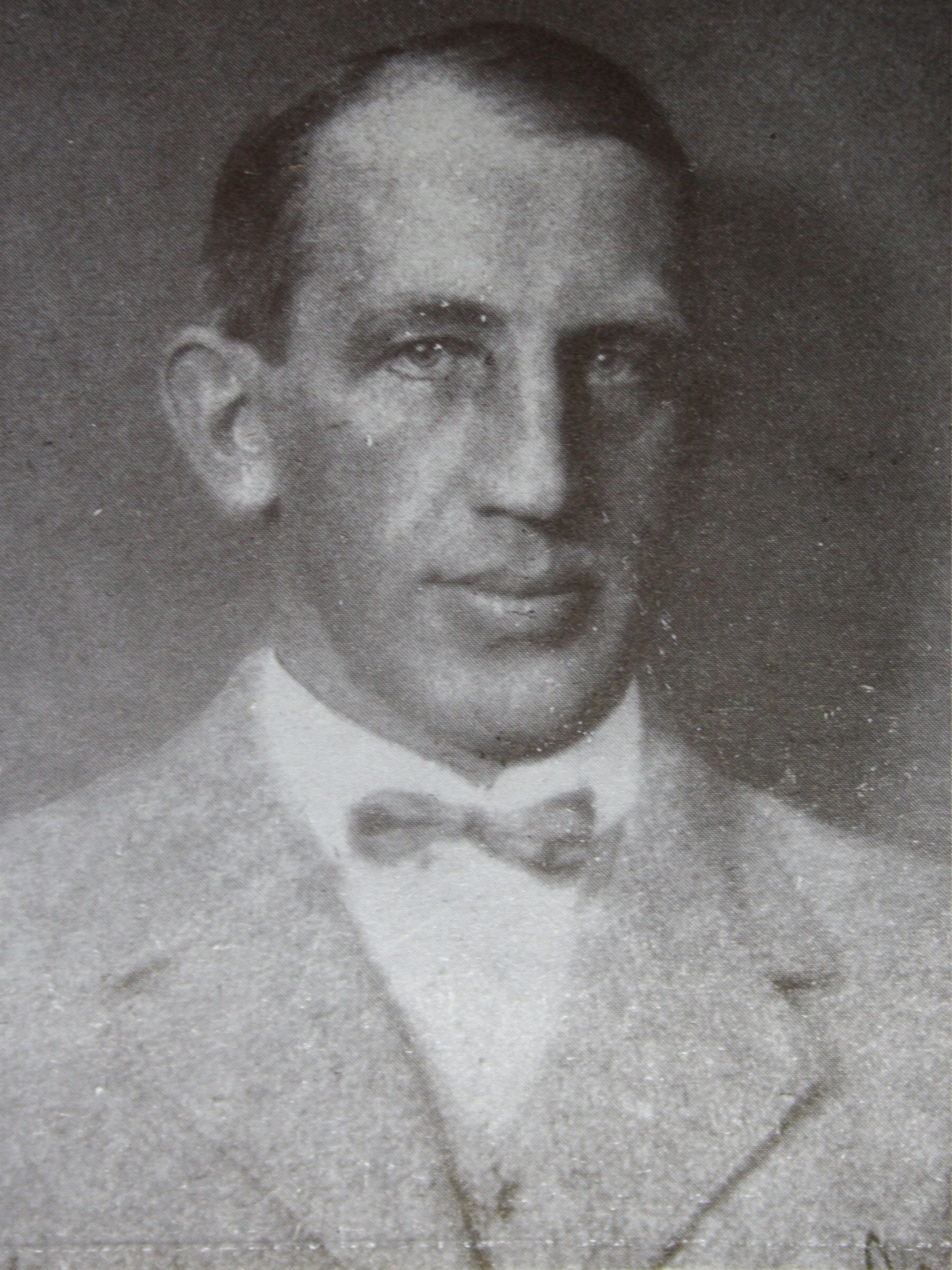

Personal information
- Nationality: German and Czech
- Born: 5 November 1883 Prague, Austria-Hungary
- Died: 21 November 1962 (aged 79) Broumov, Czechoslovakia

Sport
- Sport: marathon runner, boxer, bobsledder, cross-country skier, Nordic combined skier, footballer, ice hockey player, rower and canoeist

Emmerich Rath (5 November 1883, Prague – 21 December 1962, Broumov) was a German Bohemian athlete who competed in the 1908 Summer Olympics and in the 1912 Summer Olympics for Austria.

== Biography ==
Rath has been described as a "sporting all-rounder". He won the heavyweight boxing championship of Germany. He was a vegetarian from his youth.

In 1908, he finished 25th in the marathon race. He also participated in the 10 mile walk competition and was eliminated in the first round. Four years later, he finished 33rd in the Olympic marathon race. He also participated in the cross country race but did not finish.

In 1914, he was part of the Czech ice hockey team at the European Championships in Berlin.

Rath competed in bodybuilding contests and was a pioneer skier.
