= Paul Gunia =

German racewalker

Paul Gunia (27 February 1885 – 1 March 1955) was a German track and field athlete who competed in the 1908 Summer Olympics.

In 1908 he was eliminated in the first round of the 3500 metre walk competition as well as of the 10 mile walk event.
