= Donald Tunbridge =

British racewalker

Personal information
- Full name: Donald Arthur Tunbridge
- Nationality: British
- Born: 28 October 1920
- Died: March 1999

Sport
- Sport: Athletics
- Event: Racewalking
- Club: Highgate Harriers

Donald Arthur Tunbridge (28 October 1920 – March 1999) was a British racewalker. He competed in the men's 50 kilometres walk at the 1952 Summer Olympics. He would often participate in charity racewalking events and dress up as a penguin as part of a movement to raise exercise in Britain and reduce child obesity.
