= Tooting Bec Athletics Track =

Coordinates: 51°25′47″N 0°8′48″W

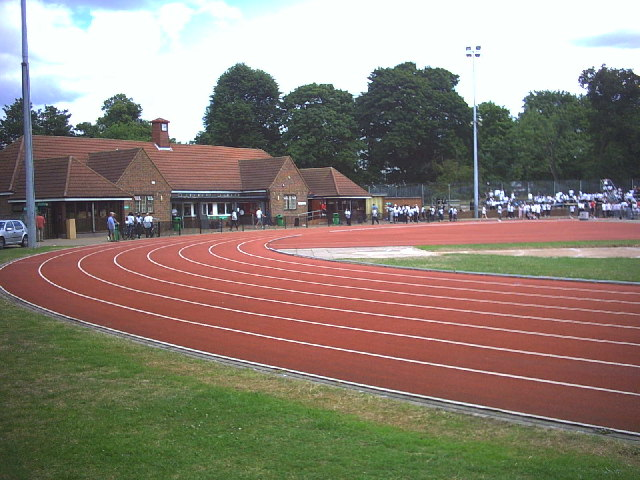
Tooting Bec Athletic Track

Tooting Bec Athletics Track & Gym is an athletics stadium in Tooting Common, near Tooting Bec, Wandsworth, southwest London, England. It is located on Tooting Bec Road and is the home venue for the Herne Hill Harriers.

== History ==
The track hosted the 1945 WAAA Championships on 18 August 1945, after a five year absence due to World War II.

An annual race event on the track in September is the Self Transcendence 24 Hour Track Race London.
