= Einar Rothman =

Swedish racewalker

Einar Rothman (3 January 1888 – 3 September 1952) was a Swedish track and field athlete who competed in the 1908 Summer Olympics.

In 1908, he finished sixth in the 3500 metre walk competition. In the 10 mile walk event he was eliminated in the first round.
