= Michael Dineen =

Irish athlete

Personal information
- Nationality: Irish
- Born: 17 April 1881 Macroom, Cork, Ireland
- Died: 23 February 1933 (aged 51) Isleworth, West London, England

Sport
- Sport: Athletics
- Event: Triple jump
- Club: Highgate Harriers

Michael Daniel Dineen (17 April 1881 – 23 February 1933) was an Irish athlete who competed at the 1908 Summer Olympics.

== Biography ==
Dineen was born in Macroom, Cork, Ireland but moved to London in his youth and joined the Highgate Harriers. Dineen was an all-round athlete competing in various other disciplines in addition to triple jump. At one meeting in Rayleigh during July 1907, he won four events, the 120 yards, the 120 yards hurdles, the high jump and long jump.

In 1908 Dineen won the Olympic Trial to qualify him for the Olympic Games and then represented the Great Britain team at the 1908 Olympic Games in London, where he participated in the men's triple jump competition. In the event held on 25 July, Dineen finished in 12th place with a jump of 13.23 metres.

At the 1912 Olympic trials, Dineen and Sidney Abrahams shared the long jump win but Dineen missed out on selection for the Stockholm games.

By trade, Dineen was a stock clerk with London Tramways and had won several competitions hosted by the Tramways throughout his career.
