= Sidney Schofield (athlete) =

British racewalker

Personal information
- Nationality: British (English)
- Born: 7 February 1883 Long Melford, England
- Died: 24 March 1956 (aged 73) Orpington, England

Sport
- Sport: Athletics
- Event: Racewalking
- Club: Surrey Walking Club

Achievements and titles
- Personal bests: 20 mile walk: 2-56:48.4 (1909); 25 mile walk: 3-37:06.8 (1911)

Sidney Charles Apps Schofield (7 February 1883 – 24 March 1956) was a British racewalker who competed at the 1908 Summer Olympics.

== Biography ==
Schofield was part of the successful Surrey Walking Club that won the 20 miles team title at the Racewalking Association championships eight times between 1908 and 1924.

Schofield represented Great Britain at the 1908 Summer Olympics in London, where he competed in the 10 mile walk event finishing sixth in heat two and failing to progress to the final.

Schofield set a 25-mile walk British record during May 1911 that lasted for 44 years. After retiring from racing, he became a leading official and judge.
