= Henry Murray (athlete) =

New Zealand hurdler and architect

Henry Murray MC
- Born: 14 January 1886; Christchurch, Colony of New Zealand
- Died: 12 April 1943 (aged 57)
- Education: Christ's College
- Spouse: Ismene Nola Simms (m. 1916)
- Relatives: Toby Murray (cousin)

Henry St Aubyn Murray MC (14 January 1886 – 12 April 1943) was a New Zealand architect and athlete.

== Biography ==
Murray was born in Christchurch, New Zealand, in 1886. He received his education at Christ's College. All Black Toby Murray was his cousin. After school, he went to the local architect Frederick John Barlow as an apprentice.

Murray was the New Zealand champion hurdler from 1906 to 1910, over 440 yards. He finished third behind John Duncker in the 120 yards hurdle event at the British 1908 AAA Championships.

He competed for Australasia in the 1908 Summer Olympics in London, England. He competed in two athletic events. In the 110 metres hurdles he was second in the heat (16.3). In the 400 metres hurdles he was second in the heat (59.8). As the heats were held as sudden death events, he did not qualify. He is listed as New Zealand Olympian number 2 by the New Zealand Olympic Committee.

He married Ismene Nola Simms on 5 April 1916, in Brisbane. She was the daughter of H. G. Simms from London, who had lately lived in Christchurch. From later that year, Murray served with the 11th Field Company of the Royal Australian Engineers in WWI. In 1917, he won a Military Cross for bravery. The citation reads:

On 4th October 1917, E. of Ypres, this officer was in charge of a party of sappers and attached Infantry during operations with instructions to construct two strong points in rear of the final objective. He successfully led his men to the positions in spite of an enemy barrage fire. Not only did he carry out his instructions constructing and wiring strong points, but he also re-organised scattered parties of men he came across during operations, and by his coolness under fire and good work, was a source of inspiration and encouragement to all in his vicinity.

As an architect, Murray undertook many commissions for the Catholic Church. His best-known work in the Church of the Holy Name in Ashburton, which is registered by Heritage New Zealand as a Category I historic structure. The two other buildings designed by him that are registered by Heritage New Zealand, both as Category II, are the Scottish Hall in Invercargill and the Rangiora Town Hall. Another notable structure that he designed is the Akaroa War Memorial.

Murray was a flying officer in the Royal New Zealand Air Force during WWII. On Saturday, 10 April 1943, he was in a jeep that skidded on loose gravel near Whangarei Harbour and overturned. He died from his injuries early the following Monday morning, aged 57. Murray's funeral was held at St Mary's Catholic Church in Central Christchurch and he was buried at Ruru Lawn Cemetery in Bromley.

Buildings and structures designed by Murray
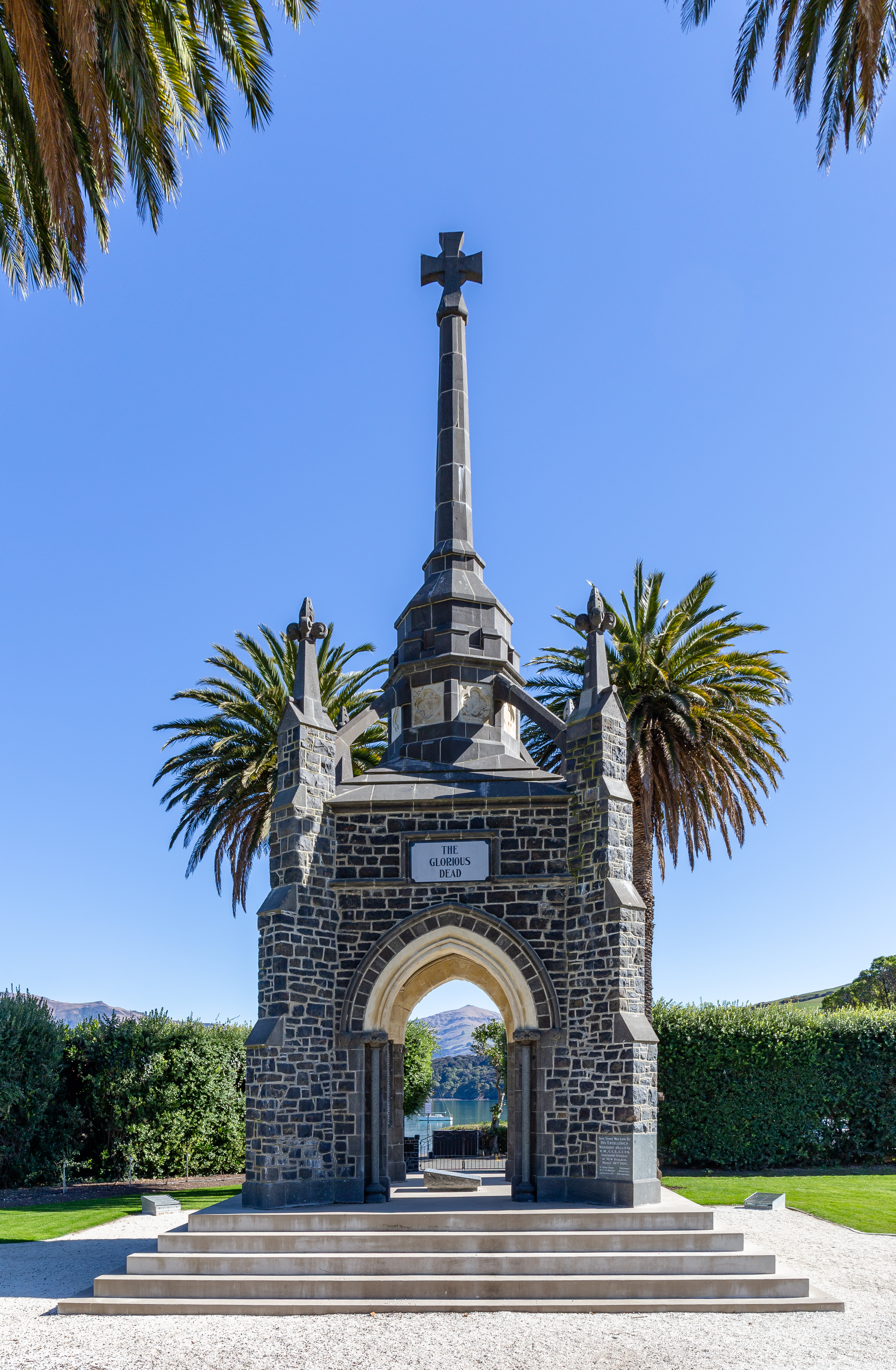
Akaroa War Memorial, designed in 1921

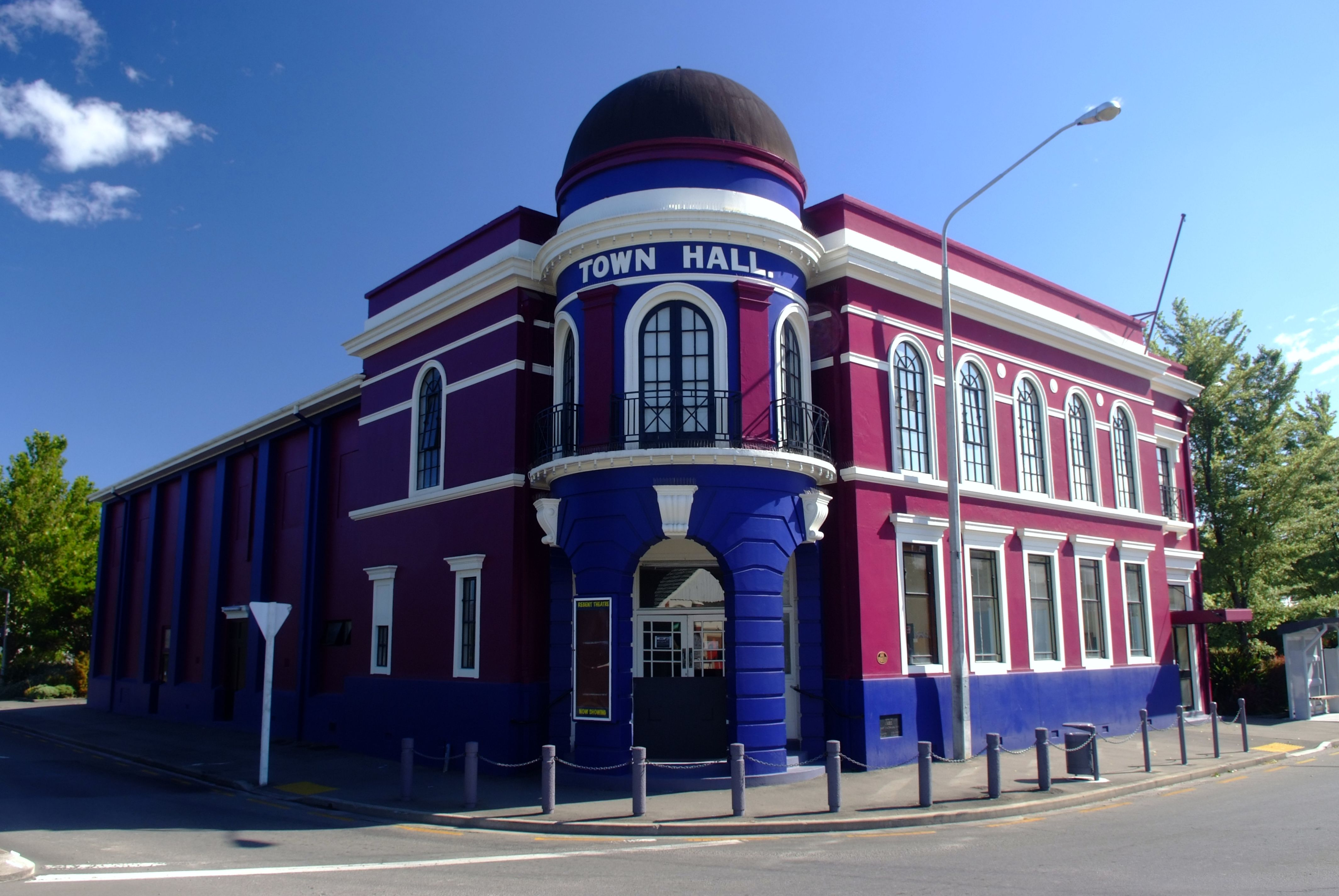
The Town Hall in Rangiora, designed in 1925

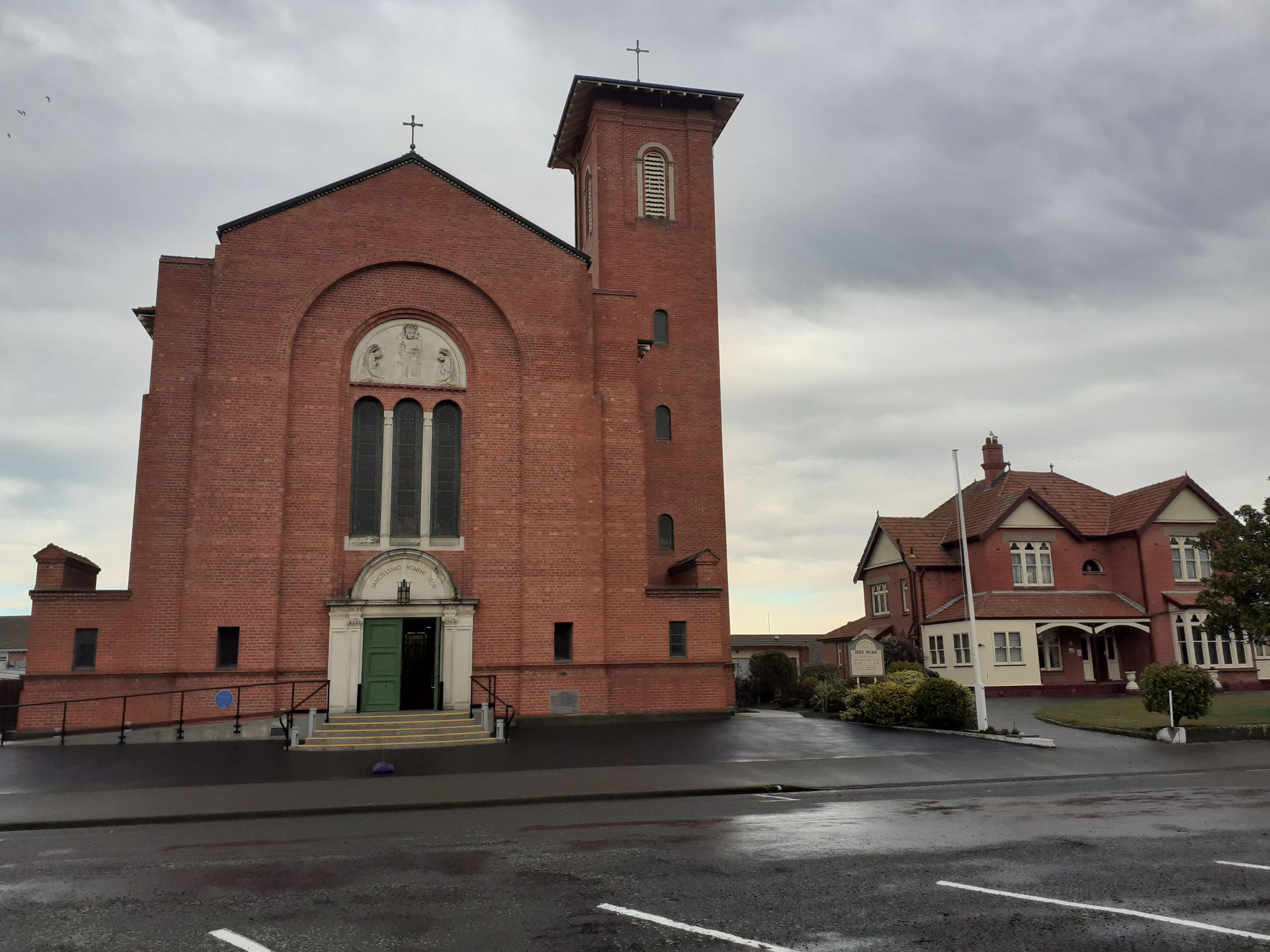
Church of the Holy Name in Ashburton, designed in the early 1930s
