= Edward Spencer (athlete) =

British racewalker (1881–1965)

Personal information
- Nationality: British (English)
- Born: 5 November 1881 Salford, England
- Died: 6 May 1965 (aged 83) Isleworth, England

Sport
- Sport: Athletics
- Event: racewalking
- Club: Polytechnic Harriers
Medal record
Representing Great Britain
athletics
Olympic Games
Bronze medal – third place	1908 London	10 mile walk

Edward Adams Spencer (5 November 1881 – 6 May 1965) was a British athlete who competed mainly in the race walk.

== Biography ==
Spencer was born in Salford, Lancashire

Spencer represented Great Britain at the 1908 Summer Olympics in London, where he competed in the 10 mile walk event. He qualified from heat one for the final and then secured a bronze medal behind George Larner and Ernest Webb. He won the bronze despite walking in with Fred Carter who was given the same time but judged to have passed the line after Spencer.

Spencer later moved to London to work as a solicitor's clerk.
