= James Lintott =

British athlete

Personal information
- Born: 29 March 1886 Wallington, London, England
- Died: 21 April 1963 (aged 77) Croydon, London, England

Sport
- Sport: Athletics
- Event: middle-distance
- Club: Ranelagh Harriers, Richmond

James Frederick Lintott (born 29 March 1886 in Wallington, London, died 21 April 1963 in Croydon) was a British athlete. He competed in the 1908 Summer Olympics in London.

== Biography ==
Lintott finished third in the 880 yards event behind Arthur Astley at the 1906 AAA Championships.

At the 1908 Olympic Games, Lintott represented Great Britain at the 1908 Summer Olympics and placed second in his semifinal heat of the 800 metres, not advancing to the final. He stayed close to winner Mel Sheppard, finishing at 1:58.8 to Sheppard's 1:58.0 before the American runner broke the world record and won the gold medal in the final.

== Sources ==
- "James Lintott". sports-reference.com. Archived from the original on 24 September 2013.
- Cook, Theodore Andrea (1908). The Fourth Olympiad, Being the Official Report. London: British Olympic Association.
- De Wael, Herman (2001). "Athletics 1908". Herman's Full Olympians. Archived from the original on 27 September 2006.
- Wudarski, Pawel (1999). "Wyniki Igrzysk Olimpijskich" (in Polish). Archived from the original on 16 February 2009.
