= Piet Ruimers =

Dutch athlete (1884–1945)

Petrus Adrianus Antonius ("Piet") Ruimers (21 October 1884 – 6 April 1945) was a Dutch track and field athlete who competed in the 1908 Summer Olympics.

He was born in Rotterdam and died in Texel during the Georgian Uprising of Texel. He and thirteen other civilians were chosen randomly and executed by German forces as reprisal for the uprising.

In 1908 he was eliminated in the first round of the 3500 metre walk competition as well as of the 10 mile walk event.
