= Godwin Withers =

British racewalker

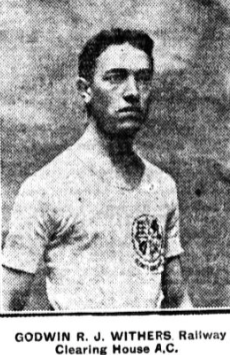

Personal information
- Nationality: British (English)
- Born: 28 September 1884 Holborn, London, england
- Died: 5 February 1976 (aged 91) Dover, England

Sport
- Sport: Athletics
- Event: racewalking
- Club: Railway Clearing House AC

Godwin Robert James Withers (28 September 1884 – 5 February 1976) was an English track and field athlete who competed in the 1908 Summer Olympics.

== Career ==
Withers was born in Holborn, London. He was a railway worker and member of the Railway Clearing House. He began walking races in 1903. In May 1910 he was one of the prominent competitors in the 25 miles track record race when he finished sixth in 3 hours 44 minutes. In the two miles AAA Championship he came fourth in 14 minutes 25 seconds. He was a London railways walking champion. In total he won 50 prizes and 30 medals. He also took part in cross-country races, winning the North of Thames Championship.

Withers represented Great Britain at the 1908 Summer Olympics in London, where he was eliminated in the first round of the 10 mile walk competition. His final race was in 1921 when he finished eighth in the 7 mile walk.

== Vegetarianism ==
Withers was a vegetarian and member of the Vegetarian Cycling and Athletic Club. He won the Vegetarian Caterers Challenge Cup 30 mile road walk race between Highgate and Hatfield in 1910. In 1911, Withers attended the Vegetarian Cycling and Athletic Club's annual dinner held at the Food Reform Restaurant in London.
