= Athletics at the 1908 Summer Olympics – Men's 3500 metres walk =

Athletics at the Olympics

Men's 3500 metres walk at the Games of the IV Olympiad
- Venue: White City Stadium
- Date: July 14, 1908
- Competitors: 25 from 8 nations

Medalists
1st place, gold medalist(s)		George Larner	Great Britain
2nd place, silver medalist(s)		Ernest Webb	Great Britain
3rd place, bronze medalist(s)		Harry Kerr	Australasia

The men's 3500 metre walk race was held for the only time at the 1908 Summer Olympics in London. The competition was held on Tuesday, July 14, 1908. It was held in two rounds. There were three heats in the first round, with the top three in each heat advancing to the final. 25 racewalkers from eight nations competed. NOCs could enter up to 12 athletes.

== Records ==
This was the first racewalking event at the Modern Olympics (discounting the 1906 Intercalated Games which is no longer considered an official Olympic event). The world record for the comparable distance of 2.25 miles was 15:51 1/5 (15:19.4 pace for 3500m).

World record	F. P. Murray (USA)	15:51 1/5 (2.25 miles)	New York City	6 November 1883
Olympic record	N/A			

== Results ==
=== First round ===
==== Heat 1 ====
Larner led the entire race.

Place	Name	Nation	Time
1	George Larner	Great Britain	15:32.0
2	Harry Kerr	Australasia	16:02.2
3	William Palmer	Great Britain	16:33.0
4	Paul Gunia	Germany	16:38.0
5	Sydney Sarel	Great Britain	17:06.0
6	Arne Højme	Denmark	17:23.4
7	Jo Goetzee	Netherlands	17:37.8
—	Bill Brown	Great Britain	Disqualified
—	Alfred Yeoumans	Great Britain	Disqualified
—	Piet Soudyn	Netherlands	Disqualified

==== Heat 2 ====
Webb had little competition, leading from the start and winning by nearly 2 minutes.

Place	Name	Nation	Time
1	Ernest Webb	Great Britain	15:17.2
2	Charles Vestergaard	Denmark	17:07.0
3	Einar Rothman	Sweden	17:40.2
4	Willem Winkelman	Netherlands	17:57.6
5	István Drubina	Hungary	18:44.6
6	Piet Ruimers	Netherlands	18:44.6
—	Richard Quinn	Great Britain	Disqualified
—	James Reid	Great Britain	Disqualified

==== Heat 3 ====
As in the other two heats, the winner led from the beginning. Unlike in the others, however, this race became close as Harrison made a late attempt to pass Goulding. Goulding finished strongly to fend off Harrison, winning by 10 seconds.

Place	Name	Nation	Time
1	George Goulding	Canada	15:54.0
2	Ralph Harrison	Great Britain	16:04.4
3	Albert Rowland	Australasia	16:08.6
4	Ernest Larner	Great Britain	16:10.0
5	Jack Butler	Great Britain	16:17.0
6	Richard Wilhelm	Germany	17:33.8
7	Jan Huijgen	Netherlands	17:37.8

=== Final ===
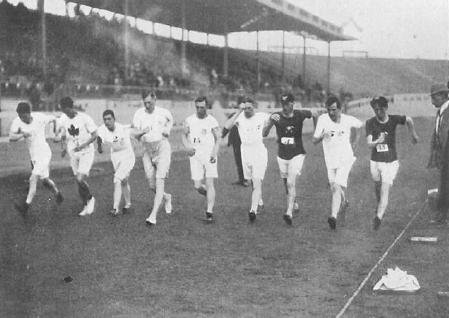
The start of the final.

Webb, Goulding, and Harrison were the early leaders. Harrison was disqualified shortly after Larner passed him. By the end of the first mile, the top four spots had solidified into the final positions. Larner had passed the field, bumping Webb to second place, while Kerr had managed to overtake Goulding.

Place	Name	Nation	Time
1	George Larner	Great Britain	14:55.0
2	Ernest Webb	Great Britain	15:07.4
3	Harry Kerr	Australasia	15:43.4
4	George Goulding	Canada	15:49.8
5	Arthur Rowland	Australasia	16:07.0
6	Charles Vestergaard	Denmark	17:21.8
7	Einar Rothman	Sweden	17:50.0
—	William Palmer	Great Britain	Did not finish
—	Ralph Harrison	Great Britain	Disqualified

== Sources ==
- Official Report of the Games of the IV Olympiad (1908).
- De Wael, Herman. Herman's Full Olympians: "Athletics 1908". Accessed 31 March 2006. Available electronically at.
