= Self Transcendence 24 Hour Track Race London =

Coordinates: 51.429798°N 0.147095°W

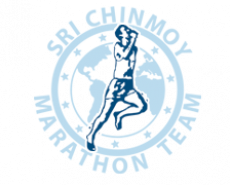
- Logo
- Date: September
- Location: London, England
- Event type: Ultramarathon
- Established: 1989
- Website: uk.srichinmoyraces.org

The Self Transcendence 24 Hour Track Race London (popularly known as the Tooting 24) is an Ultramarathon race in London, England. The run takes place annually in September, organised by the Sri Chinmoy Marathon Team. It is on the Tooting Bec Athletics Track, on a 400-metre track.

The race first took place in 1989.

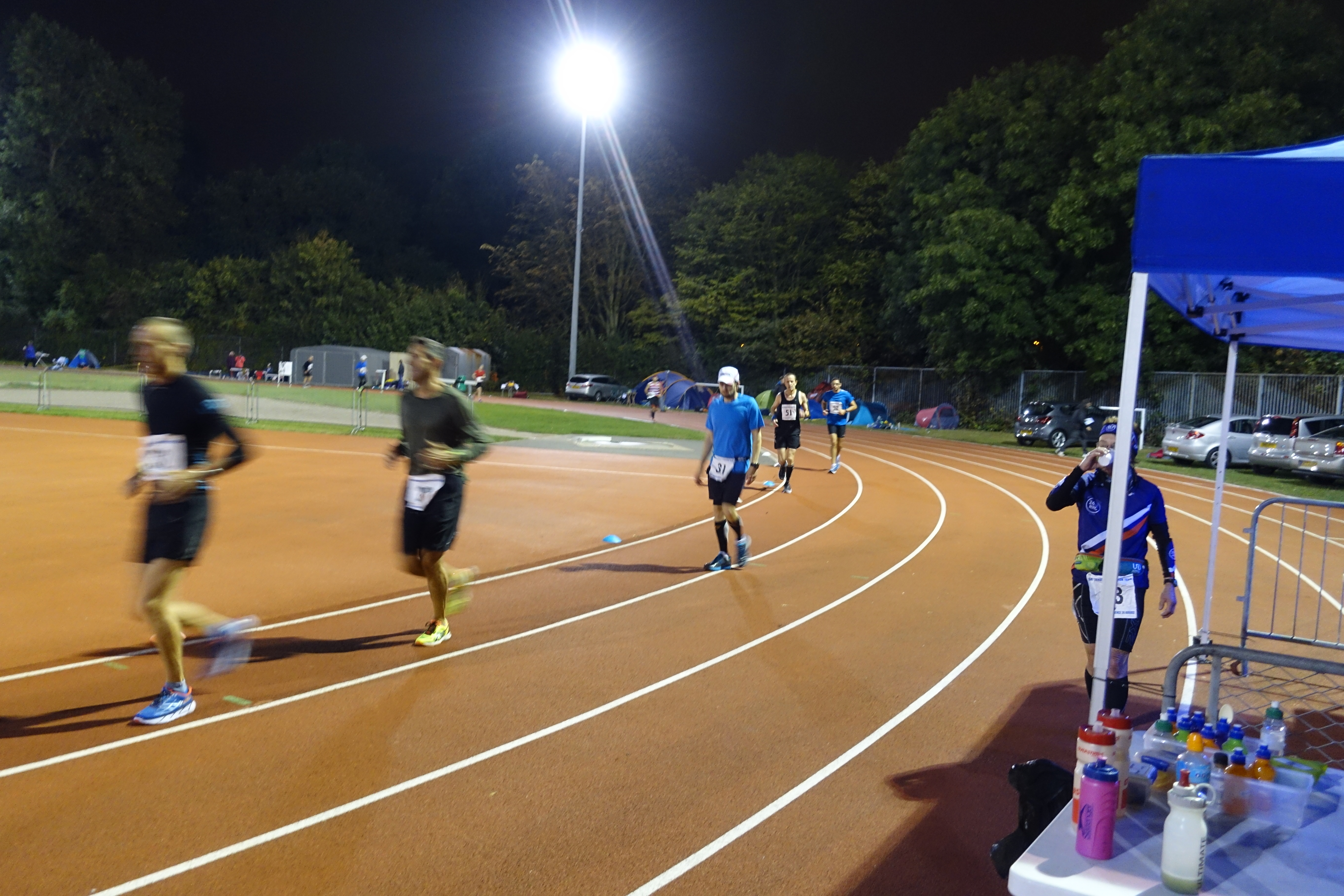
Runners in 2016
