= Athletics at the 1908 Summer Olympics – Men's 10 miles walk =

Athletics at the Olympics

Men's 10 miles walk at the Games of the IV Olympiad
- Venue: White City Stadium
- Dates: July 16, 1908 (semifinals); July 17, 1908 (final)
- Competitors: 25 from 8 nations

Medalists
1st place, gold medalist(s)		George Larner	Great Britain
2nd place, silver medalist(s)		Ernest Webb	Great Britain
3rd place, bronze medalist(s)		Edward Spencer	Great Britain

The men's 10 miles walk race was held at the 1908 Summer Olympics in London. This was the only time the event was held. The competition was held on Thursday, July 16, 1908, and on Friday, July 17, 1908. The competition was held in two rounds. There were two heats in the first round, with the top four in each heat advancing to the final. 25 race walkers from eight nations competed. NOCs could enter up to 12 athletes.

== Records ==
This was the Olympic debut of racewalking at this distance. The world record for the 10-mile racewalk at the time was 1:17:40 3/4 by E. E. Merrill.

World record	E. E. Merrill (USA)	1:17:40 3/4	Boston	5 October 1880
Olympic record	N/A			

George Larner and Ernest Webb both broke the previous world record mark in the final, with Larner setting a new world record of 1:15:57.4.

== Results ==
=== First round ===
The first round heats were held on Thursday, July 16, 1908.

==== Heat 1 ====
Carter, Larner, and Spencer intentionally drew even to finish in a line. Carter had been in second place, followed by Spencer and then Larner before they did so.

Place	Name	Nation	Time
1	Ernest Webb	Great Britain	1:20:18.8
2	Fred Carter	Great Britain	1:21:25.4
2	Ernest Larner	Great Britain	1:21:25.4
2	Edward Spencer	Great Britain	1:21:25.4
5	Arthur Rowland	Australasia	1:21:57:6
6	Thomas Hammond	Great Britain	1:23:44.0
7	Paul Gunia	Germany	1:26:09.4
—	Jo Goetzee	Netherlands	Did not finish
—	Arne Højme	Denmark	Did not finish
—	Piet Soudyn	Netherlands	Did not finish
—	Willem Winkelman	Netherlands	Did not finish
—	Alfred Yeoumans	Great Britain	Disqualified

==== Heat 2 ====
Place	Name	Nation	Time
1	George Larner	Great Britain	1:18:19.0
2	Ralph Harrison	Great Britain	1:18:21.2
3	Harry Kerr	Australasia	1:18:40.2
4	William Palmer	Great Britain	1:19:04.0
5	Godwin Withers	Great Britain	1:19:22.4
6	Sidney Schofield	Great Britain	1:21:07.4
7	Piet Ruimers	Netherlands	1:27:38.8
8	Emmerich Rath	Austria	1:30:33.8
—	Jack Butler	Great Britain	Did not finish
—	George Goulding	Canada	Did not finish
—	Jan Huijgen	Netherlands	Did not finish
—	Einar Rothman	Sweden	Did not finish
—	Charles Vestergaard	Denmark	Did not finish

=== Final ===
The final was held on Friday, July 17, 1908.

Place	Name	Nation	Time
1	George Larner	Great Britain	1:15:57.4
2	Ernest Webb	Great Britain	1:17:31.0
3	Edward Spencer	Great Britain	1:21:20.2
4	Fred Carter	Great Britain	1:21:20.2
5	Ernest Larner	Great Britain	1:24:26.2
6	William Palmer	Great Britain	Unknown
—	Ralph Harrison	Great Britain	Did not start
—	Harry Kerr	Australasia	Did not start

== Sources ==
- Official Report of the Games of the IV Olympiad (1908).
- De Wael, Herman. Herman's Full Olympians: "Athletics 1908". Accessed 31 March 2006. Available electronically at.
