= Richard Wilhelm (race walker) =

German racewalker

Richard Wilhelm (24 September 1887 – 4 August 1915) was a German track and field athlete who competed in the 1908 Summer Olympics. In 1908, he was eliminated in the first round of the 3500 metre walk competition. He was killed in action during World War I.
