= Jack Butler (racewalker) =

British athlete

Personal information
- Nationality: British (English)
- Born: 19 December 1870 Upper Norwood, London, England
- Died: 3 October 1959 (aged 88) Hastings, East Sussex, England

Sport
- Sport: Athletics
- Event: Racewalking
- Club: Polytechnic Harriers

John Butler (19 December 1870 – 3 October 1959) was a British racewalker who competed at the 1908 Summer Olympics.

== Biography ==
Butler was born in Upper Norwood, London, England.

Butler finished second behind his Polytechnic Harriers teammate William Sturgess in the 4 miles walk event for three consecutive years at the 1898 AAA Championships, 1899 AAA Championships and 1900 AAA Championships.

The following year he finally became the British champion at the AAA Championships after the event increased in distance from 4 miles to 7 miles at the 1901 AAA Championships. After a second place behind Sturgess in 1902 he secured a second AAA title at the 1903 AAA Championships.

Butler represented the Great Britain team at the 1908 Olympic Games in London, where he participated in the men's 3500 metres walk. In his heat he finished fifth and failed to progress to the Olympic final. Just two days later he was due to participate in the men's 10 miles walk event but failed to finish in heat two.
