= Jo Goetzee =

Dutch race walker

Johannes Elias Goetzee (March 8, 1884 – August 26, 1935) was a Dutch race walker who competed in the 1908 Summer Olympics. Goetzee was born in Delfshaven and died in Rotterdam.

In 1908, he was eliminated in the first round of the 3500 metre walk competition as well as of the 10 mile walk event.
