= James Reid (athlete) =

Irish athlete (1883–1935)

Personal information
- Nationality: Irish
- Born: 1883 Ireland
- Died: 13 January 1935 (aged 51–52) Dublin, Ireland

Sport
- Sport: Athletics
- Event: Racewalking
- Club: Clonliffe Harriers, Dublin

John James Reid (1883 – 13 January 1935) was an Irish racewalker who competed at the 1908 Summer Olympics.

== Biography ==
In 1903, Reid was a member of the Clonliffe Harriers of Dublin and participated in the Gaelic Athletic Association Championship and the following year he finished runner-up in the Navan Sports Handicap over the distance of one mile.

Reid was the Irish 3-mile walk AAA champion for three consecutive years in 1906, 1907 and 1908.

Reid represented the Great Britain team at the 1908 Olympic Games in London, where he participated in the men's 3500 metres walk. In his heat he failed to progress to the Olympic final because he was disqualified for violations.
