= Jan Huijgen =

Dutch racewalker

Johannes Hendrikus ("Jan") Huijgen (7 February 1886 – 20 February 1964) was a Dutch track and field athlete who competed in the 1908 Summer Olympics. He was born in Rotterdam. In 1908 he was eliminated in the first round of the 3500 metre walk competition as well as of the 10 mile walk event.
