= Willem Winkelman =

Dutch racewalker

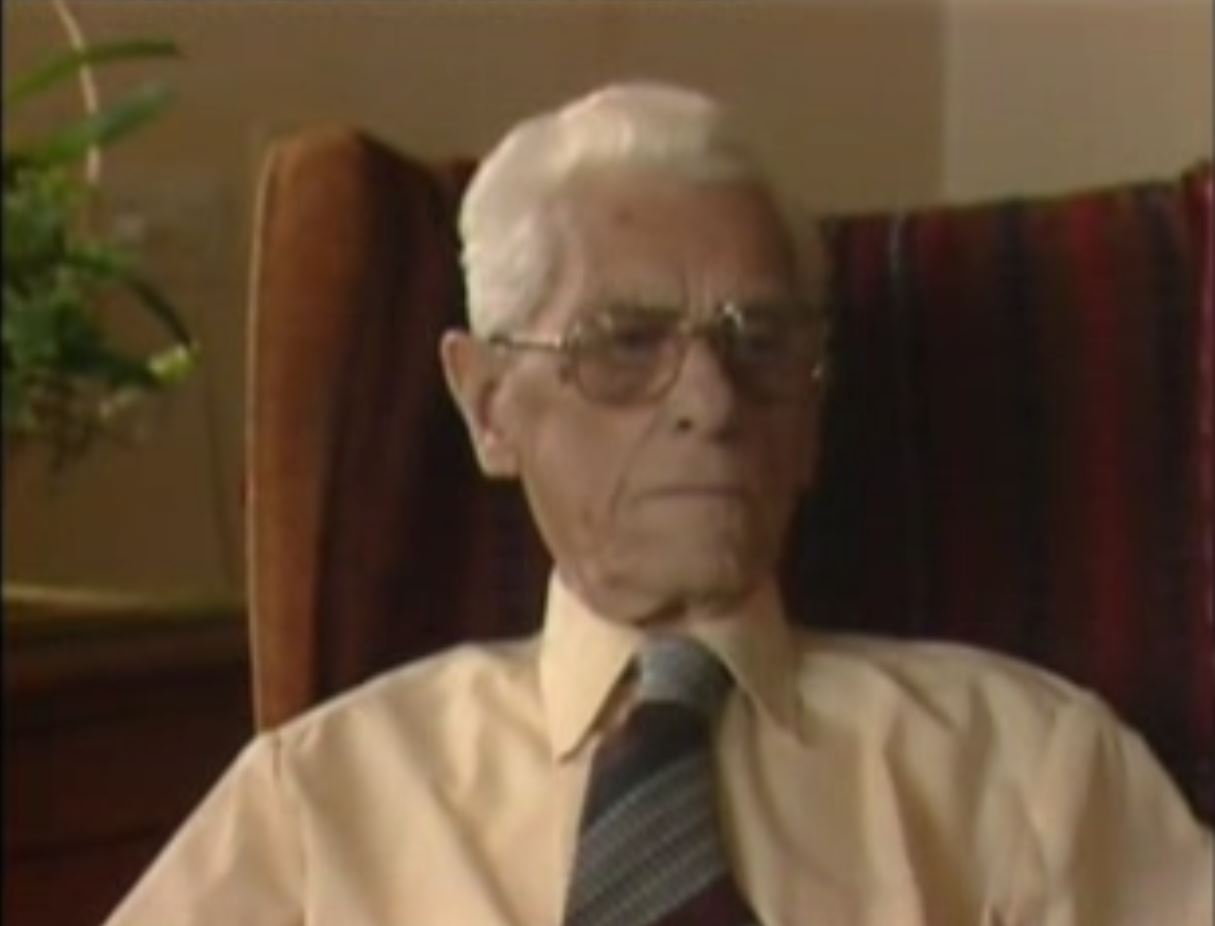
Willem Winkelman as elderly person

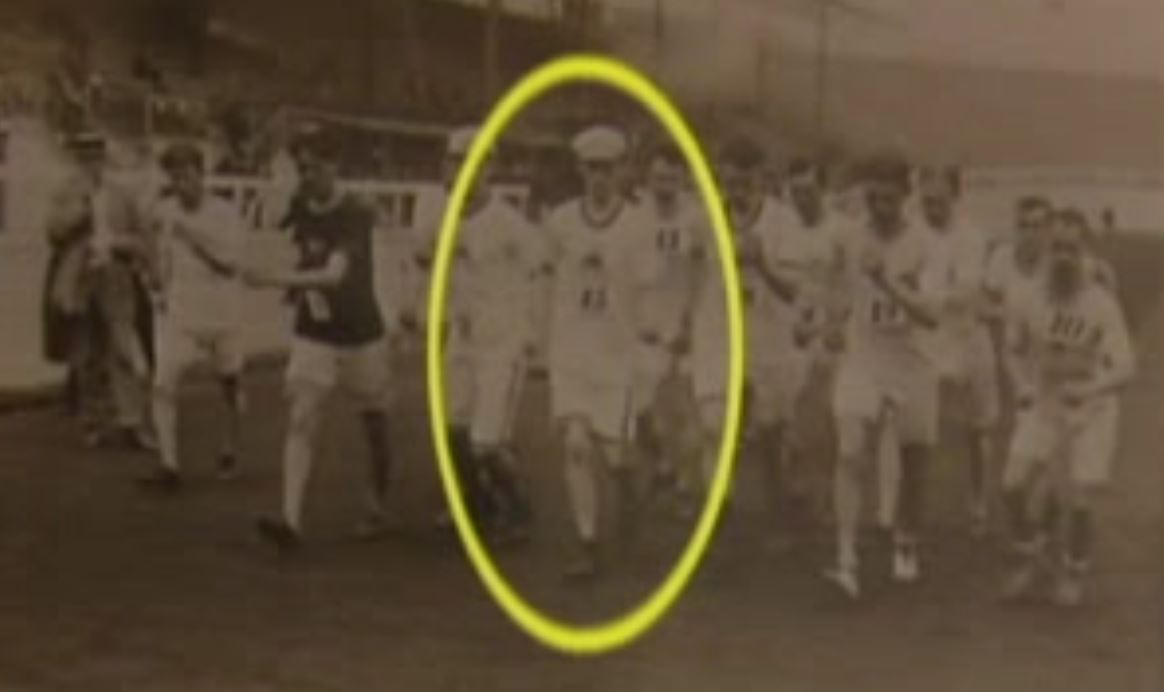
Willem Winkelman at the start of the 1908 Olympics in London

Wilhelmus Frederikus ("Willem") Winkelman (14 July 1887 – 1 July 1990) was a Dutch track and field athlete who competed in the 1908 Summer Olympics. He was born in Delfshaven and died in Voorburg.

In 1908, he was eliminated in the first round of the 3500 metre walk competition as well as of the 10 mile walk event.
