= James Beale (athlete) =

British track and field athlete

Personal information
- Nationality: British
- Born: 7 February 1881 Waltham Cross, England
- Died: 19 February 1968 (aged 87) Haringey, London, England

Sport
- Sport: Long-distance running
- Event: Marathon
- Club: Hampton Harriers; Polytechnic Harriers

James George Beale (7 February 1881 – 19 February 1968) was a British track and field athlete who competed in the 1908 Summer Olympics and the 1912 Summer Olympics.

== Biography ==
Beale, born in Waltham Cross, finished second behind Albert Aldridge in the 10 miles event at the 1906 AAA Championships.

Beale represented Great Britain at the 1908 Summer Olympics in London, where he competed in the men's marathon and finished 17th. He was only one of four British athletes to complete the race.

Four years later Beale represented Great Britain at the 1912 Summer Olympics in Stockholm but did not finish in the men's marathon event.
