= Arthur Astley =

British athlete

Personal information
- Born: 11 March 1881 Southport, England
- Died: September 1915 (aged 34) Southport, England

Sport
- Sport: Athletics
- Event: middle-distance
- Club: Salford Harriers

Arthur Astley (11 March 1881 – September 1915) was a British track and field athlete from Lancashire who competed at the 1908 Summer Olympics.

== Biography ==
Astley was a member of the Salford Harriers. He became the National 880 yards champion after winning the AAA Championships title at the 1906 AAA Championships.

Astley represented Great Britain at the 1908 Summer Olympics in London, where he ran the 800 metres, finishing second in his semi-final (first round) heat with a time of 1:59.9. He did not advance to the final. The next day, Astley also took second place in his preliminary heat of the 400 metres, not advancing to the semifinals.

== Sources ==
- Cook, Theodore Andrea (1908). The Fourth Olympiad, Being the Official Report. London: British Olympic Association.
- De Wael, Herman (2001). "Athletics 1908". Herman's Full Olympians. Archived from the original on 27 September 2006.
- Wudarski, Pawel (1999). "Wyniki Igrzysk Olimpijskich" (in Polish). Archived from the original on 14 June 2006.
- Gjerde, Arild; Jeroen Heijmans; Bill Mallon; Hilary Evans (March 2013). "Arthur Astley Bio, Stats, and Results". Olympics. Sports Reference.com. Archived from the original on 17 April 2020.
