= Joseph Lynch (athlete) =

Australian long-distance runner

Personal information
- Born: 22 April 1878 Sydney, Australia
- Died: 10 March 1952 (aged 73) Sydney, Australia

Sport
- Country: Australia
- Sport: Track and field

Joseph Michael Lynch (22 April 1878 – 10 March 1952) was an Australian long-distance runner. Lynch was born in 1878 in Darlington, Sydney. He was the youngest son of Irish immigrants John Lynch and Mary Hassett.

== Career ==
He trained with the East Sydney Athletics Club and competed in club, state, and national events; his best national performance was coming third in the one-mile race in the 1909–10 season. He competed for Australasia in the 1908 Summer Olympics in London. This team also included Australian legends such as Snowy Baker.

At the 1908 Summer Olympics, Lynch competed in three events, in the 1500 metres event, he finished fifth in his heat and only the winners of the heats qualified for the final, he also competed in the Marathon race and the 5 miles competition but didn't finish either race, he retired from the Marathon after five miles, he was due to participate in the 800 metres but in the end he didn't compete in it.

== Military career ==
He enlisted in the AIF Expeditionary Force on 4 January 1915. He served at Gallipoli, Flanders and the Somme. He was wounded at the Somme on 22 July 1916 and evacuated to Britain. In November 1916, he returned to Australia and, in March 1917, was discharged. He never really returned to athletics and carried on living a simple life in Sydney, Australia.

Lynch was also an actor, which saw him perform in Australia, the United States, and London.

He died in a traffic accident in Sydney, Australia.

== Sources ==
- Cook, Theodore Andrea (1908). The Fourth Olympiad, Being the Official Report. London: British Olympic Association.
- De Wael, Herman (2001). "Athletics 1908". Herman's Full Olympians. Archived from the original on 27 September 2006.
- Wudarski, Pawel (1999). "Wyniki Igrzysk Olimpijskich" (in Polish). Archived from the original on 16 February 2009.
