= Piet Soudyn =

Dutch racewalker (1880–1946)

Petrus Marie "Piet" Soudyn (March 3, 1880 – September 18, 1946) was a Dutch racewalker who competed in the 1908 Summer Olympics and was eliminated in the first round of the 10 mile walk event. He was born and died in Rotterdam.
