= György Sztantics =

Hungarian racewalker

Medal record

Men's athletics

Representing Hungary

Intercalated Games
Gold medal – first place	1906 Athens	3000 m walk

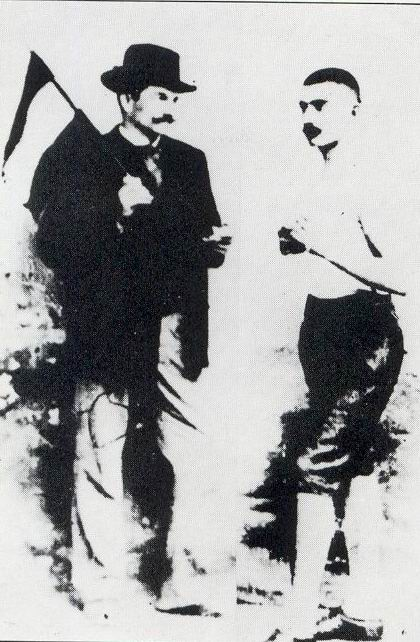
Winner of the Olympic medal in Berlin in 1901.

György Sztantics (Serbo-Croatian: Đuro Stantić) (Szabadka, 19 August 1878 – Szabadka, 10 July 1918) was a Hungarian athlete (ethnic Bunjevac from today's Serbia) who competed mainly in the 3000 metre walk.

He competed for Hungary at the 1906 Intercalated Games held in Athens, Greece in the 3000 metre walk where he won the gold medal.
