= Edward Cooke (swimmer) =

Australian swimmer

Personal information
- Full name: Edmund John Leslie Cooke
- Nickname: "Teddy"
- Nationality: Australian
- Born: 1889 St. Leonards, New South Wales, Aus.
- Died: November 25, 1958 (aged 69) East Melbourne, Victoria, Aus.

Sport
- Sport: Swimming
- Strokes: breaststroke, freestyle
- Club: North Sydney Swimming Club

Edward "Edmund" John Leslie Cooke was an Australian swimmer who competed in two events at the 1908 London Olympics, the 100 metres freestyle, and the 200 metres breaststroke, though he did not make the finals in either event, and did not complete the 200 metres breaststroke. His name is more accurately listed as Edmund, not Edward in Olympic accounts, particularly Olympedia. He competed in two events at the London 1908 Summer Olympics.

Cooke was born in 1889 in St. Leonards, New South Wales, Australia. He swam for the North Sydney Swimming Club.

== 1908 London Olympics ==
Cooke competed in two events at the London 1908 Summer Olympics, though he did not make the final four in either event. In the July, 1908, 100 metres freestyle at White City Stadium in London, Cooke swam in Heat 6, for the country then designated in the Olympics as Australasia. American Charlie Daniels Won the Gold medal, Hungarian Zoltan Halmay won the silver, and Swedish swimmer Harald Julin won the bronze. In a fast event for the era, both Daniels and Halmay broke the standing world record for the event in a close finish. Cooke also swam the 200 metres breaststroke for Australasia, where he competed in the 5th heat, though he did not finish the race. heat. Fred Holman of Great Britain won the gold, William Robinson of Great Britain took the silver, and Pontus Hansen of Sweden took the bronze.

In addition to swimming, Cooke also participated in lifesaving competitions.

=== Careers ===
In 1909, after returning from London, he gave up competitive swimming to become a farmer in Karangi, New South Wales.

Cooke died 25 November 1958 in East Melbourne, Victoria, Australia.
