= Alfred Yeoumans =

British athlete

Personal information
- Nationality: British (Welsh)
- Born: 4 November 1876 Enderby, Leicestershire, England
- Died: 29 September 1955 (aged 78) Swansea, Glamorgan, Wales

Sport
- Sport: Athletics
- Event: Racewalking
- Club: Highgate Harriers; Swansea A & CC

Alfred Thomas Yeoumans (4 November 1876 – 29 September 1955) was a British racewalker who competed at the 1908 Summer Olympics.

== Biography ==
Yeoumans was born in Enderby, Leicestershire, England and was a member of the Highgate Harriers and Swansea A & CC. By trade he was a dockworker in Swansea. Yeoumans was the Welsh champion.

Yeoumans became the British 2 miles walk champion after winning the British AAA Championships title at the 1906 AAA Championships.

Yeoumans represented the Great Britain team at the 1908 Olympic Games in London, where he participated in the men's 3500 metres walk. In his heat he was disqualified for violations and failed to progress to the final. Just two days later he also competed in the men's 10 miles walk event and was once again disqualified for violations in his heat.
