= Fred Carter (athlete) =

British racewalker (1879–1941)

Personal information
- Nationality: British (English)
- Born: 13 January 1879 Kensington, England
- Died: 4 June 1941 (aged 62) Sheffield, England

Sport
- Sport: Athletics
- Event: Racewalking
- Club: Queens Park Harriers

Achievements and titles
- Personal bests: 7 mile walk: 53:20.2 (1906); 10 mile walk: 1-21:20.2 (1908)

Frederick Thomas Carter also known as Frank Carter (13 January 1879 – 4 June 1941) was a British racewalker who competed at the 1908 Summer Olympics.

== Biography ==
Carter became the British 7 miles walk champion after winning the British AAA Championships title at the 1906 AAA Championships.

Carter represented Great Britain at the 1908 Summer Olympics in London, where he competed in the 10 miles walk event, finishing second in heat one behind Ernest Webb before just missing out on a medal after finishing in fourth place in the Olympic final. He had walked in together with Edward Spencer who was given the same time but Spencer was judged to have passed the line before Carter.
