= Donald Linden =

Canadian racewalker

Medal record

Men's athletics

Representing Canada

Intercalated Games
Silver medal – second place	1906 Athens	1500 metre walk

Donald Stacey Linden (March 3, 1877 – March 13, 1964) was a Canadian athlete who competed mainly in the 1500 metre walk.

He competed for Canada in the 1906 Intercalated Games held in Athens, Greece in the 1500 metre walk where he won the silver medal.
