= George Larner =

British athlete (1875–1949)

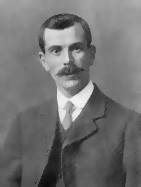
- George Larner, photographed in 1909

Personal information
- Full name: George Edward Larner
- Born: 7 March 1875 Langley, Berkshire
- Died: 4 March 1949 (aged 73) Brighton, Brighton and Hove

Sport
- Sport: Athletics
- Event: Racewalking
- Club: Highgate Harriers
Medal record
Representing Great Britain
Olympic Games
Gold medal – first place	1908 London	3500 metre walk
Gold medal – first place	1908 London	10-mile walk

George Edward Larner (7 February 1875 – 4 March 1949) was an English athlete who competed mainly in the 10-mile walk. He was a multi-time Amateur Athletic Association of England champion and won two gold medals at the 1908 Summer Olympics in London.

== Career ==
Larner was a Brighton policeman, and took up athletics at the age of 28 in 1903. At the 1904 AAA Championships, he won the Amateur Athletic Association of England (AAA) titles for the two and seven-mile track walk. He went on to retain these titles in the following year. He wanted to retire as he found training conflicted with his job, but was instead granted an extended leave period by the Police Force. In 1906, he took a two-year break from athletics to train for the upcoming 1908 Summer Olympics in London. After returning, he was disqualified in his first race in April 1908 at the AAA event in walking over seven miles, but the following July, he won the two-mile title.

He competed for Great Britain in the 1908 Summer Games in the 3500 metre walk on 14 July 1908, winning the race ahead of fellow Briton Ernest Webb, who took silver, and New Zealander Harry Kerr. Webb had initially taken the lead, but Larner caught up during the second lap and won the race by over twelve seconds. Afterward, he matched this with another gold medal in the 10-mile walk, this time in a British clean sweep, with Webb again winning silver and Edward Spencer winning bronze. Both he and Webb were inside the world record time, with Larner setting world records for both the 9-mile and the 10-mile distances. His final time was 1 hour, 15 minutes and 57.4 seconds. He was one of ten competitors to win more than a single gold medal at the 1908 Games.

In 1909, he wrote a book on walking entitled Larner's Text Book on Walking: Exercise, Pleasure, Sport. His final AAA success came at the 1911 AAA Championships when he won the 7 mile race once more.

== Legacy ==
Larner broke the world record in walking in all distances between two miles and ten miles, and the longest distance in one hour, which he set at 13,275 metres (8.249 mi). The record he set for the 2-mile on 14 July 1904 stood for the following 39 years.

The 1908 Summer Games was the only time that either the men's 10-mile walk or the 3500 metre walk took place. This technically means that Larner remains the reigning Olympic champion in both events, and the Olympic record holder. He is one of only a handful of British athletes to have won more than a single gold medal at any one Olympic Games, with only Charlotte Cooper having achieved it at an earlier Olympics, and Henry Taylor winning three medals at the 1908 Games.

Larner's name has been carried on the front of a Scania Omnidekka bus in the fleet of Brighton & Hove since October 2007.
