= Bert Stronach =

- Full name: Robert Summers Stronach
- Born: 19 May 1882 Partick, Glasgow, Scotland
- Died: 28 August 1966 (aged 84)

Rugby union career
- Position: Forward
International career
Years	Team	Apps	(Points)
1901–05	Scotland	5	(3)

Robert Summers Stronach (19 May 1882 — 28 August 1966) was a Scottish sportsperson who competed as a hurdler in athletics, rugby union player and Canadian football player.

Born in Partick, Glasgow, Stronach was a Scottish record holder in 120 yard hurdles, setting the new mark at an even 16 seconds when he claimed the first of his three successive British national titles at the AAA Championships from 1904 to 1906. He combined his athletics with rugby union, a sport he played as a forward with Glasgow Academicals RFC. His five Scotland caps included their 1905 Calcutta Cup victory against England.

Stronach took up Canadian football after emigrating to Ontario and played for the Ottawa Rough Riders as an outside wing, helping them win the 1909 Interprovincial Championship. He served with the 38th Battalion of the Canadian Expeditionary Force in World War I, during which he was gassed and took part in the Battle of Vimy Ridge.

After the war, Stronach was Superintendent of Banff National Park, until the injuries he had sustained on the Western Front forced him to retire in 1929. He lived his later years in Oakville, Ontario.

== See also ==
- List of Scotland national rugby union players
