= George Goulding =

Canadian racewalker

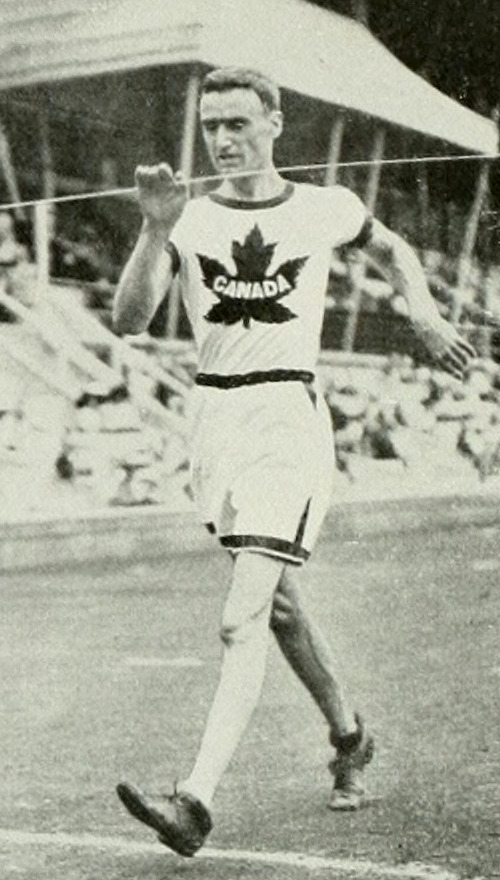
- George Goulding at the 1912 Olympics

Personal information
- Born: 19 November 1884 Hull, England
- Died: 31 January 1966 (aged 80) Toronto, Ontario, Canada

Sport
- Sport: Walking, long-distance running
- Club: Central YMCA, Toronto
Medal record
Representing Canada
Olympic Games
Gold medal – first place	1912 Stockholm	10 kilometre walk

George Henry Goulding (19 November 1884 – 31 January 1966) was a Canadian athlete who competed mainly in the 10 kilometre walk.

He competed in three events at the 1908 Olympic Games in London: the 3500 metre walking race, in which he came fourth; the 10 mile walk, which he failed to finish; and the Marathon, in which he came 22nd out of 55 starters and 27 finishers. The two walking distances were discontinued after London.

He also competed for Canada in the 1912 Summer Olympics held in Stockholm, Sweden in the inaugural 10 kilometre walk where he won the gold medal.
