= Ernest Webb =

British athlete (1874–1937)

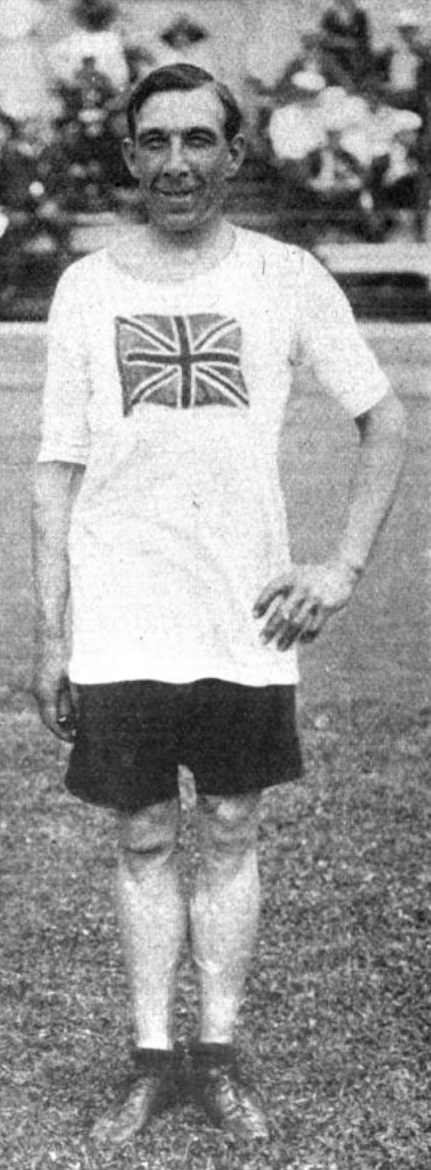
- Webb at the 1912 Summer Olympics

Personal information
- Born: 25 April 1874 Hackney, London, England
- Died: 24 February 1937 (aged 62) Toronto, Canada

Sport
- Sport: Athletics
- Event: walking events
- Club: Herne Hill Harriers
Medal record
Men's athletics
Representing Great Britain
Olympic Games
Silver medal – second place	1908 London	3500 metre walk
Silver medal – second place	1908 London	10 mile walk
Silver medal – second place	1912 Stockholm	10 kilometre walk

Ernest James Webb (25 April 1874 – 24 February 1937) was a British athlete who competed mainly in the 10-mile walk and competed for Great Britain in the 1908 Summer Olympics held in London and the 1912 Summer Olympics in Sweden.

== Biography ==
Webb, born in Hackney, London, competed for the Herne Hill Harriers.

Webb became the National 7 miles champion after winning the AAA Championships title at the 1908 AAA Championships. He also finished second behind George Larner in the 2 miles walk event.

At the 1908 Olympic Games, Webb competed in the 10 mile walk, winning the silver medal behind fellow Brit George Larner. The two of them repeated this in the 3500 metre walk, giving Ernest Webb his second silver medal of the games.

Webb won four more AAA titles in the 2 miles and 7 miles walks, at the 1909 AAA Championships and 1910 AAA Championships.

Three years later in 1912, he returned to the Olympic Games in Stockholm, Sweden, where he competed in the inaugural 10 kilometre walk and finished off with his third Olympic silver behind Canada's George Goulding.

He died in Toronto, Canada.
