= Harry Kerr (race walker) =

New Zealand racewalker

Personal information
- Full name: Henry Edward Kerr
- Born: 28 January 1879 Inglewood, New Zealand
- Died: 17 May 1951 (aged 72) Taranaki, New Zealand
- Height: 1.84 m (6 ft 0 in)
- Weight: 76 kg (168 lb)
- Relative: Winston Cowie (great-grandson)

Sport
- Sport: Athletics
Medal record
Representing Australasia
Olympic Games
Bronze medal – third place	1908 London	3500 metre walk

Henry Edward Kerr (28 January 1879 – 17 May 1951) was a New Zealand athlete who competed mainly in walking events. He competed for Australasia in the 1908 Summer Olympics held in London in the 3500 metre walk where he won the bronze medal. This was the first time a New Zealand-born person had won an Olympic medal.

== Biography ==
Kerr was born in Taranaki and was a champion shooter and keen rugby player, as well as competing in a variety of track and field events. Competing for a time as a professional he was required to stand down from competition for two years in order to regain his amateur status. After winning numerous national titles Kerr virtually retired in 1912 and briefly served in World War I in mid-1918, but returned to win two more national titles in 1925 at the age of 46.

Kerr was inducted into the New Zealand Sports Hall of Fame in 1996.

On 13 July 2008 to commemorate the first Olympic Games medal by a New Zealander (actually on 14 July 1908) the Harry Kerr Centennial Walking Relay was held at Sovereign Stadium, Mairangi Bay, Auckland. Two events were held, a 5×10 km relay and a 3500 m individual event. A shield for the winning team was presented by Kerr's daughter-in-law. It was proposed that this become an annual event, but no subsequent events were held.

Kerr's great-grandson is New Zealand film director and rugby union player Winston Cowie.
