= Haymarket, London =

Street in the St. James's, London

Coordinates: 51°30′31″N 00°07′55″W

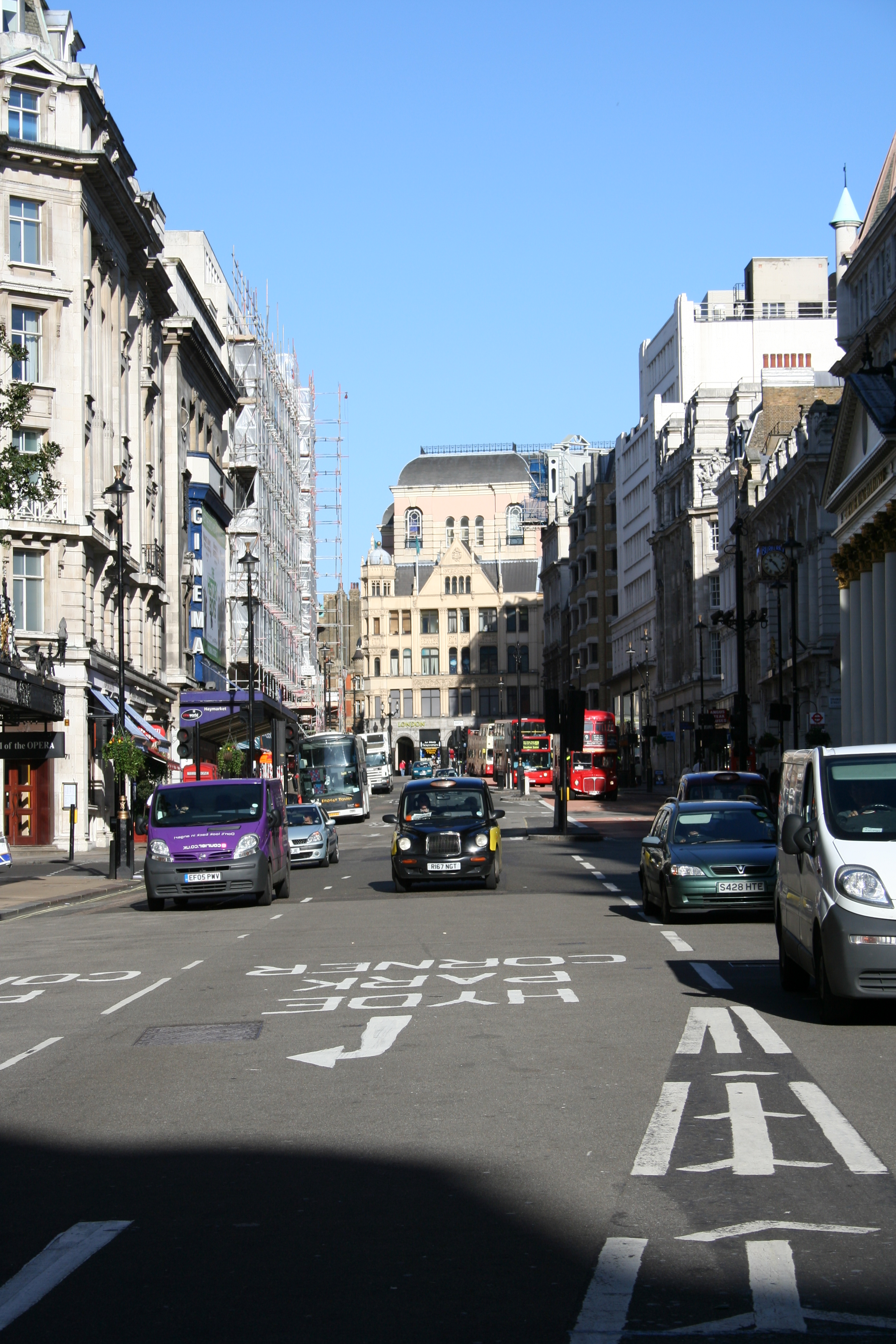
Haymarket, 2006

Haymarket is a street in the St James's area of the City of Westminster. It runs from Piccadilly Circus in the north to Pall Mall at the southern end. Located on the street are the Theatre Royal, His Majesty's Theatre, New Zealand House, a cinema complex and restaurants.

== History ==
=== Origins ===
The broad street connecting Pall Mall with Piccadilly is recorded in the Elizabethan era and, as the name suggests, was chiefly used as a street market for the sale of fodder and other farm produce. At that time, it was a rural spot, with the village of Charing the closest settlement. This practice continued until the reign of William III; by that time, carts carrying hay and straw were allowed in the street to trade, toll-free. In 1692, when the street was paved, a tax was levied on the loads: 3d for a load of hay and 2d for one of straw. In 1830, the market was moved by Act of Parliament to Cumberland Market near Regent's Park.

In earlier centuries, the Haymarket was also one of the centres of prostitution in London, but this is no longer the case. Old and New London informs us, in 1878:

Situated in the centre of the pleasure-going Westend population, the Haymarket is a great place for hotels, supper-houses, and foreign cafés; and it need hardly be added here, that so many of its taverns became the resort of the loosest characters, after the closing of the theatres, who turned night into day, and who were so constantly appearing before the sitting magistrates in consequence of drunken riots and street rows, that the Legislature interfered, and an Act of Parliament was passed, compelling the closing of such houses of refreshment at twelve o'clock.

=== Theatres ===
It is part of London's theatre district, the West End, and has been a theatrical location at least since the 17th century. The Queen's Theatre in the Haymarket, designed by John Vanbrugh, opened in 1705 on the site of what is now His Majesty's Theatre. It was intended for drama, but the acoustics turned out to be more suitable for opera, and from 1710 to 1745, most operas and some oratorios of George Frederick Handel were premièred at this theatre, which was renamed the King's Theatre at the death of Queen Anne in 1714. After Vanbrugh's building had been destroyed by fire in 1790, another King's Theatre on the same site followed. After another fire, Her Majesty's Theatre was opened there in 1897. This building, the fourth on the same site, is still in use for major musical productions. Its title changes with the sex of the monarch: it became His Majesty's Theatre in 1902 following the death of Queen Victoria, Her Majesty's Theatre in 1952 when Elizabeth II succeeded her father, and, after the death of Elizabeth II in 2022, has reverted to His Majesty's Theatre. Today's Theatre Royal at another site in the Haymarket is a building originally designed by John Nash (1820), replacing a previous theatre of the 1720s.

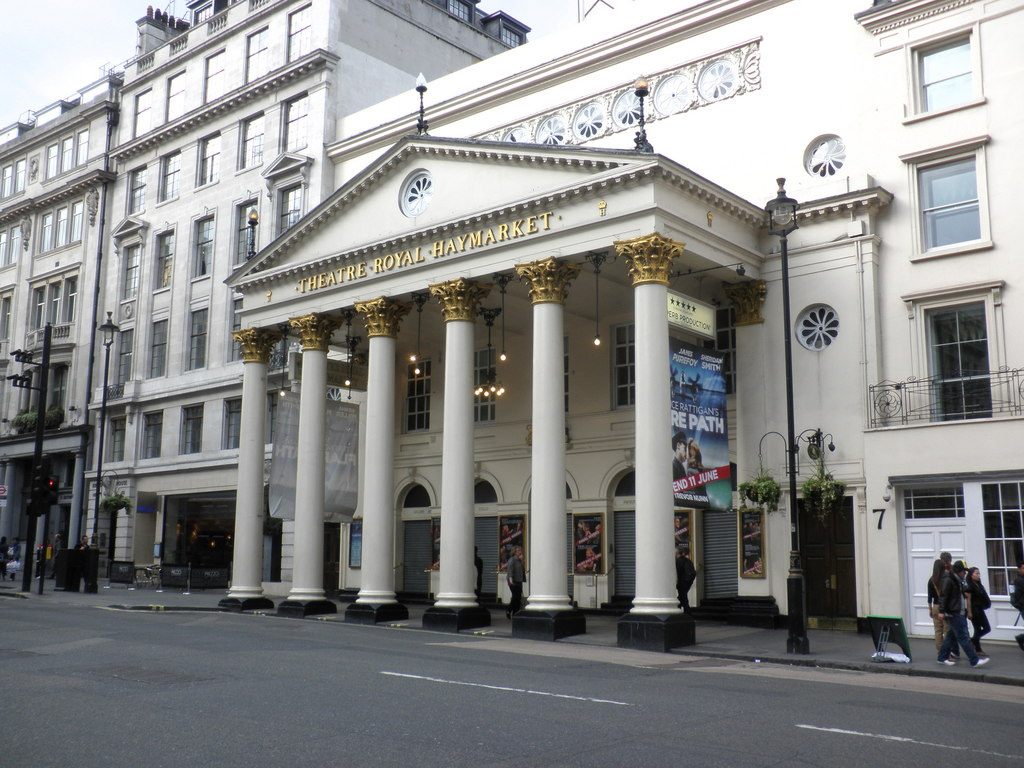
Theatre Royal Haymarket (1821), designed by John Nash

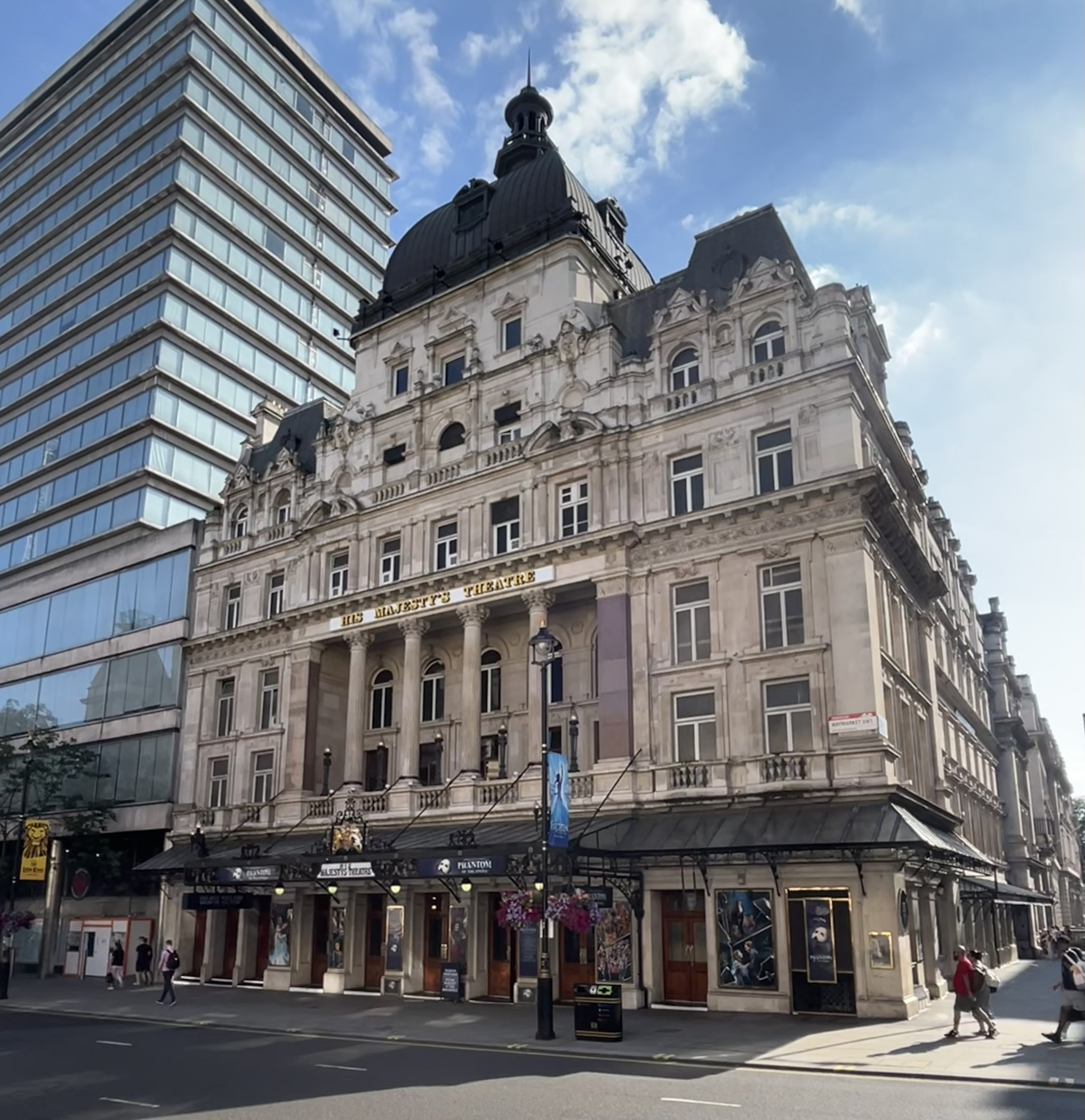
His Majesty's Theatre (1897), designed by C. J. Phipps

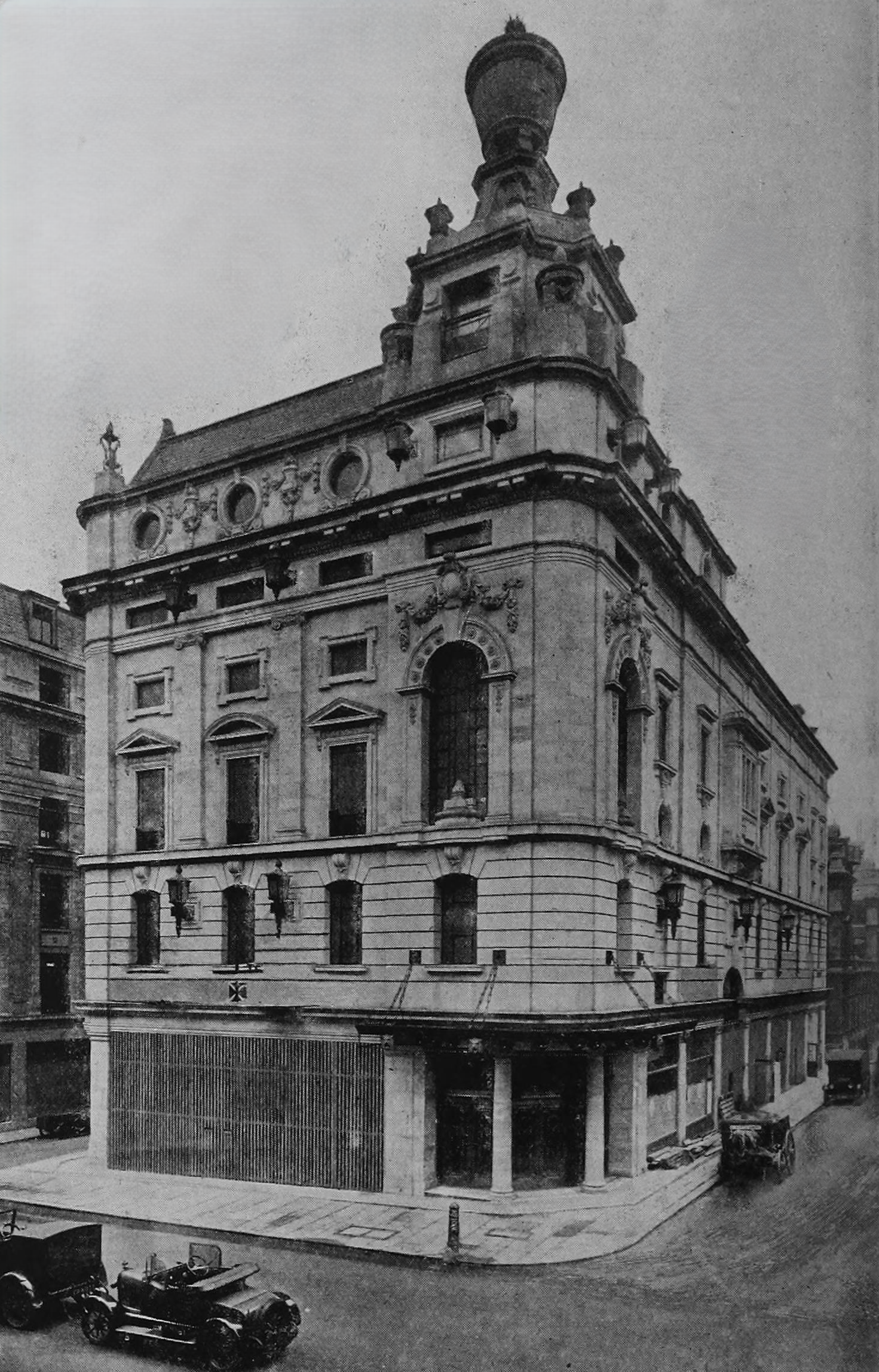
Capitol Theatre (1925), designed by Andrew Mather

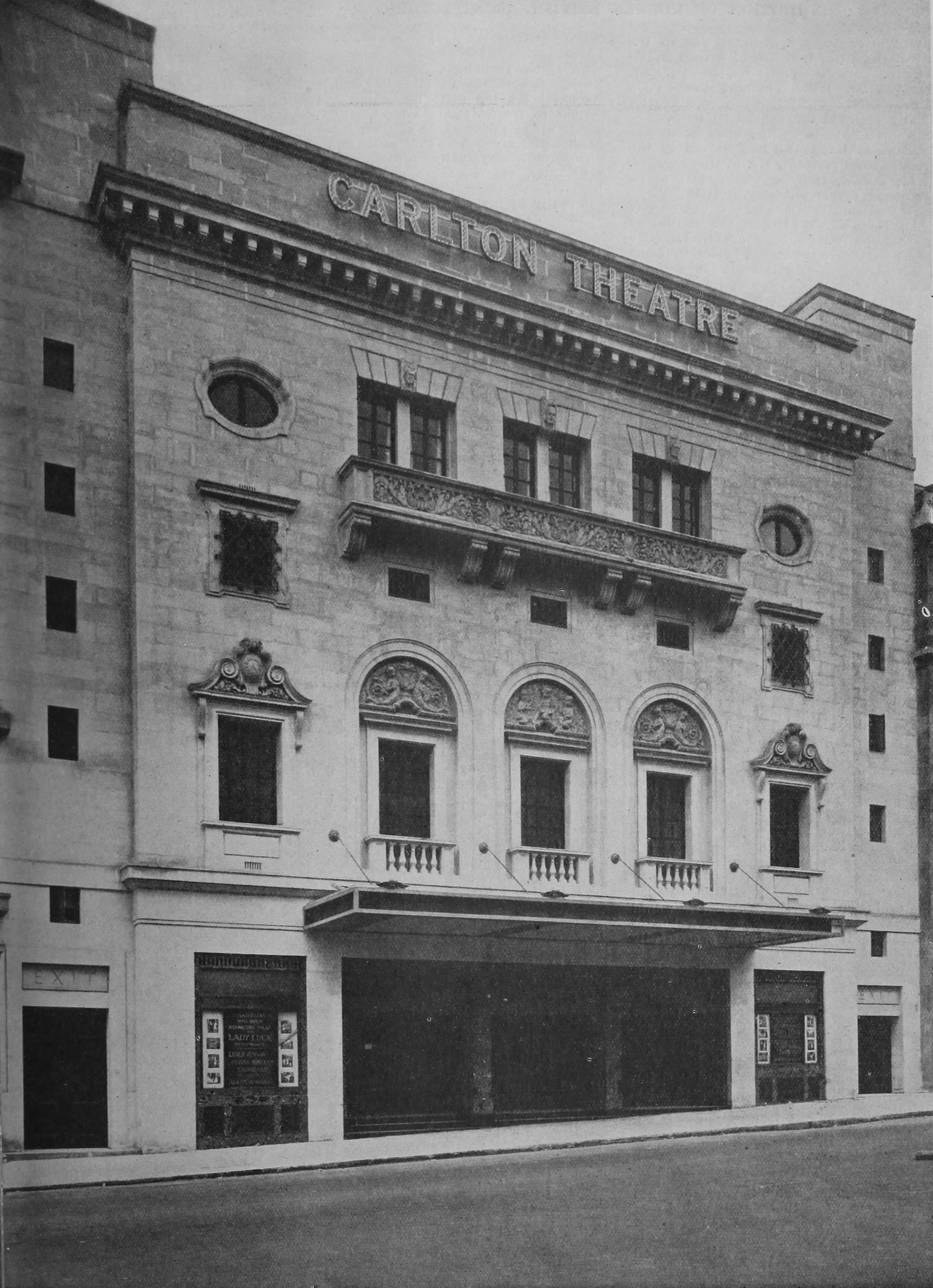
Carlton Theatre (1927), designed by Frank Verity

== Haymarket today ==
Haymarket runs parallel to Regent Street St James (Lower Regent Street) and together the two roads form a one-way system, Lower Regent Street taking northbound traffic and Haymarket taking southbound traffic. The two roads are classified as part of the A4 route from London to Avonmouth, near Bristol.

On 29 June 2007, the Metropolitan Police Service "made safe" a car bomb that had been parked in Haymarket as part of the 2007 London attempted attacks.
