= Golden Eagle (play) =

1946 play

- Written by: Clifford Bax
- Original language: English
- Genre: Historical
- Setting: Scotland, sixteenth century

Premiere
- Date premiered: 29 January 1946
- Place premiered: Westminster Theatre, London

Golden Eagle is a 1946 historical play by the British writer Clifford Bax. It portrays the reign of Mary, Queen of Scots.

It ran for 39 performances at the Westminster Theatre in London's West End between 29 January and 2 March 1946. The original cast featured Claire Luce as Queen Mary and also included Arthur Wontner, David Horne and Torin Thatcher. It was produced and directed by Anmer Hall. The play's music was composed by the author's brother Arnold Bax with whom he often collaborated.

== Bibliography ==
- Wearing, J.P. The London Stage 1940-1949: A Calendar of Productions, Performers, and Personnel. Rowman & Littlefield, 2014.
