= Shepherd's Bush Empire =

Music venue in West London, England

O2 Shepherd's Bush Empire
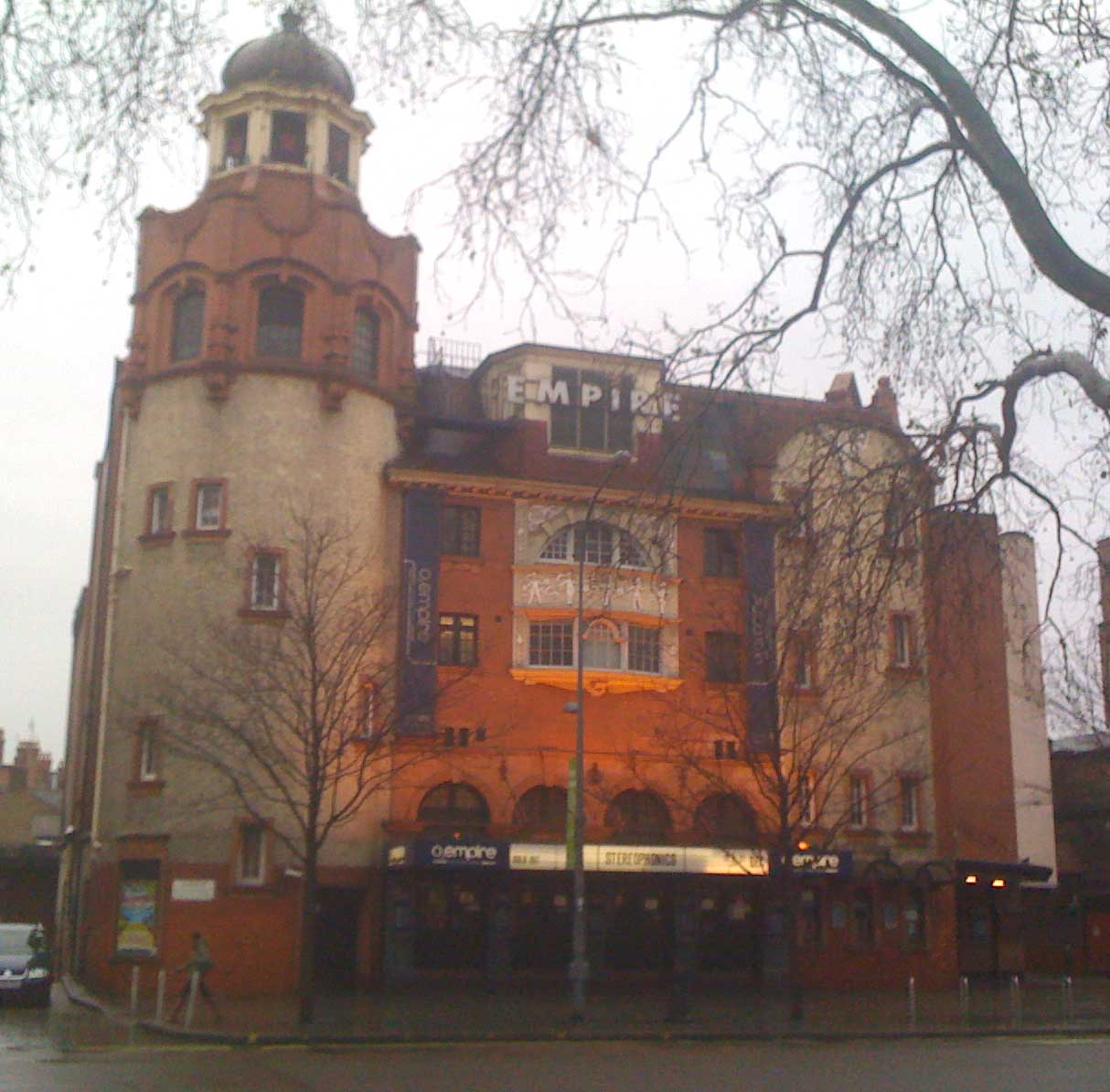

- Location within London Borough of Hammersmith and Fulham
- Former names: Shepherd's Bush Empire (1903–53; 1994–2009); BBC Television Theatre (1953–1994)
- Address: Shepherd's Bush Green; London, W12; United Kingdom
- Coordinates: 51°30′13″N 0°13′28″W
- Owner: Academy Music Group
- Operator: Academy Music Group
- Capacity: 2,000
- Public transit: Shepherd's Bush Market; Goldhawk Road; Shepherd's Bush; Shepherd's Bush

Construction
- Opened: 17 August 1903; 123 years ago
- Renovated: 1993
- Architect: Frank Matcham
- Project manager: Oswald Stoll

Listed Building – Grade II
- Official name: Shepherds Bush Empire
- Designated: 2 October 1981
- Reference no.: 1358593

Website
- o2shepherdsbushempire.co.uk

The Shepherd's Bush Empire (currently known as O_{2} Shepherd's Bush Empire for sponsorship reasons, and formerly known as the BBC Television Theatre) is a music venue in Shepherd's Bush, West London, run by the Academy Music Group. It was originally built in 1903 as a music hall for impresario Oswald Stoll, designed by theatre architect Frank Matcham; among its early performers was Charlie Chaplin. In 1953 it became the BBC Television Theatre. Since 1994, it has operated as a music venue. It is a Grade II listed building.

== History ==
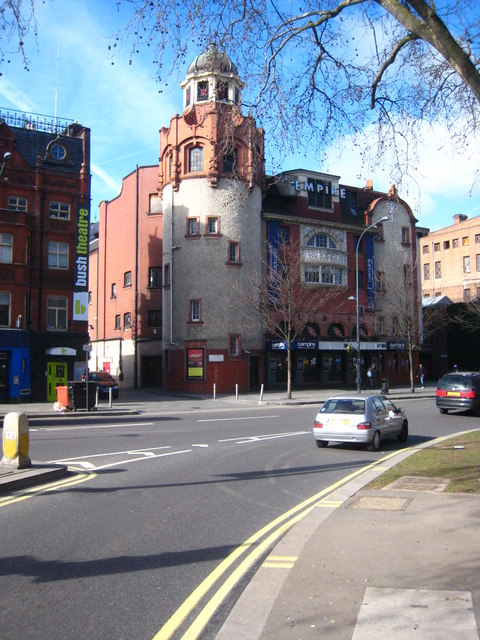
Shepherd's Bush Empire

=== Origins ===
The Shepherd's Bush Empire was built in 1903 for impresario Oswald Stoll, designed by theatre architect Frank Matcham. Ashly's Circus performed at Shepherd's Bush Empire and presented to George Strong a trophy for riding The Bucking Mule "Sloper' on 8 September 1905. The first performers at the new theatre were The Fred Karno Troupe including Charlie Chaplin (1906). The Empire staged music-hall entertainments, such as variety performances and revues, until the early 1950s, by which time the popularity of these forms of entertainment was declining.

=== Second World War ===
During the Second World War, the Shepherd's Bush Empire narrowly escaped being hit by a flying bomb, which in 1944 hit the neighbouring Shepherd's Bush Pavilion, destroying the original interior. The Pavilion did not re-open until 1955.

=== Post war era ===
In 1953, the Empire was sold to the BBC, which put it to use as a television studio–theatre, renaming it the BBC Television Theatre. Among the programmes produced there were Crackerjack, The Old Grey Whistle Test, That's Life!, The Generation Game, Juke Box Jury, This Is Your Life, Jim'll Fix It, most of the BBC's light entertainment music shows, such as those starring Cliff Richard, Lulu, Cilla Black, Dusty Springfield, Shirley Bassey, Vera Lynn, Harry Secombe, Petula Clark, Val Doonican, and the UK's Eurovision Song Contest preliminary heat, A Song for Europe. In 1985, the theatre was turned over for exclusive use by Wogan, which was broadcast three nights a week from the theatre. The BBC vacated the building in 1991.

In 1993, The Shepherd's Bush Empire was acquired by entrepreneur Andrew Mahler, who invested over £1 million in the building in improvements and refurbishments. In 1994, the building re-opened under its original name of The Shepherd's Bush Empire; since then it has hosted gigs and dance nights.

== Shepherd's Bush Empire today ==
Live performances filmed at the venue and released on DVD include a King Crimson concert on 3 July 2000, presented on the two-disc set Eyes Wide Open, Siouxsie and the Banshees' The Seven Year Itch album and DVD recorded over two nights In July 2002, Frank Turner's "Take to the Road" DVD, Opeth's first live DVD (Lamentations) recorded at the Shepherd's Bush Empire on Thursday 25 September 2003, a November 2005 concert by indie band The Wedding Present and The Only Ones comeback concert in June 2007. In November 2007, Amy Winehouse recorded I Told You I Was Trouble: Live in London. On 27, 28 and 29 February, and 1 March 2008, gothic rock pioneers The Mission recorded their farewell concerts, The Final Chapter, for release on CD and DVD. In addition to this, Transatlantic's third live release, "Whirld Tour 2010: Live in London", was recorded and filmed at the venue. Nik Kershaw released a DVD of his September 2012 performance there, recorded as part of the tour promoting his album Ei8ht (album). Folk-rock band Mumford & Sons recorded their album Live from Shepherd's Bush Empire there. In 2015, Public Image Ltd recorded their album "Live at Shepherd's Bush Empire" there.

The Empire has a capacity of 2,000, and has been chosen as a venue for small gigs or as a venue for 'surprise' warm-up gigs. For example, during their No Security Tour in 1999, the Rolling Stones put in a performance, with Sheryl Crow as support, on 8 June.

== See also ==
- History of Shepherd's Bush
- Shepherd's Bush Palladium
