= Shepherd's Bush Palladium =

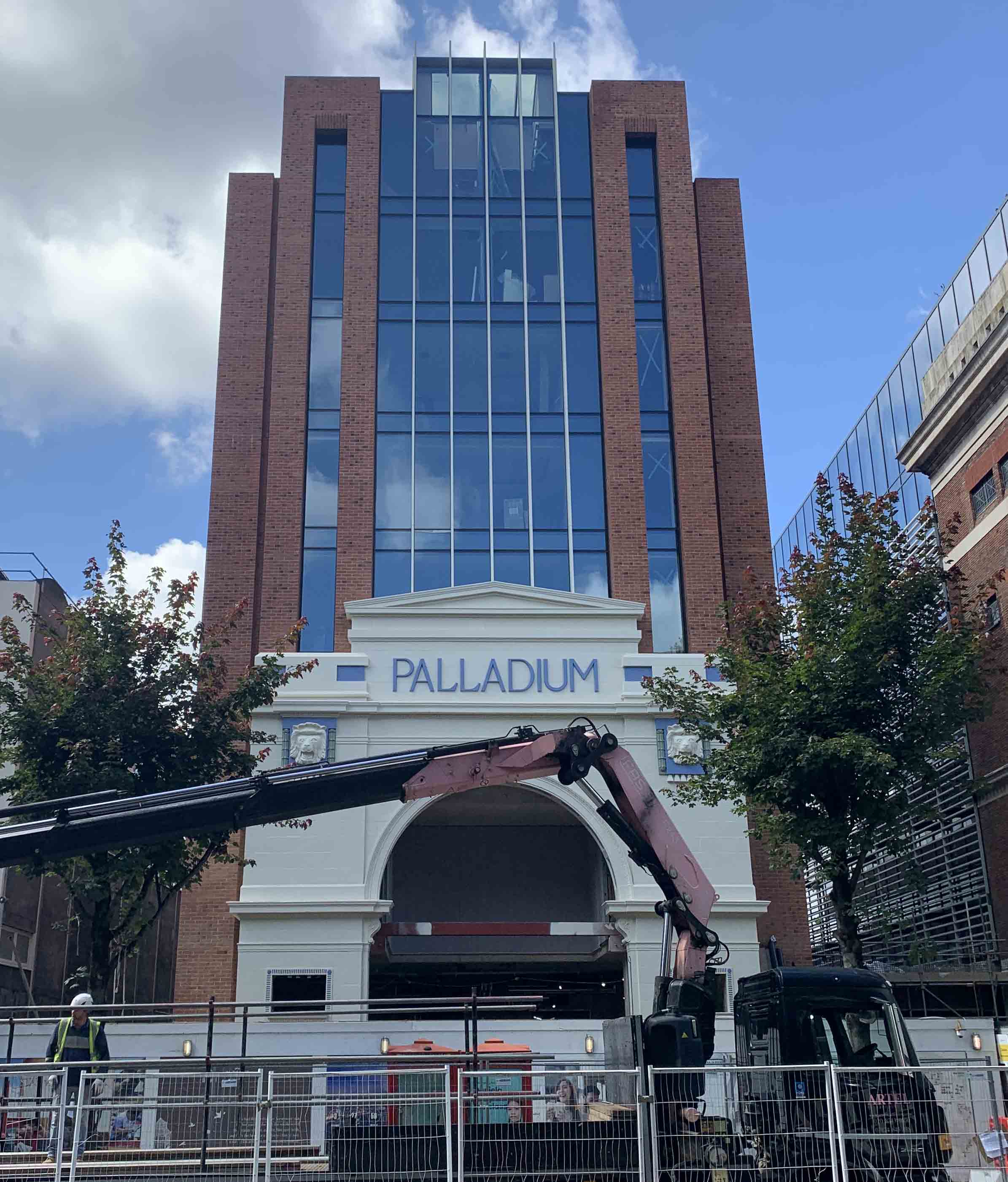
- Shepherd's Bush Palladium August 2021

- Location within London Borough of Hammersmith and Fulham
- Former names: Cinematograph the Essoldo; The Classic; Odeon Cinema

General information
- Type: Cinema, later a pub
- Architectural style: Edwardian.
- Location: Shepherd's Bush, Shepherd's Bush Green, London, England
- Coordinates: 51°30′13″N 0°13′29″W
- Completed: 1910
- Renovated: 1923
- Demolished: 2019

Technical details
- Structural system: Brick, concrete.

Design and construction
- Architect: John Stanley Coombe Beard

Website
- http://www.walkabout.eu.com/venues/walkabout-shepherds-bush

The Shepherd's Bush Palladium (alternatively Shepherds Bush Palladium) was an historic building in Shepherd's Bush, London, originally built in 1910 as the Shepherd's Bush Cinematograph Theatre. The building had a number of owners over the years and finally stopped showing films in 1981. After standing empty for some time, it was eventually converted into a pub and for many years was owned and operated by the Walkabout chain of Australasian-themed bars. In October 2013 the building was sold to a property developer and in 2019 it was largely demolished, replaced in 2021 with a 16-storey block of flats, retaining the original 1920s facade.

== History ==
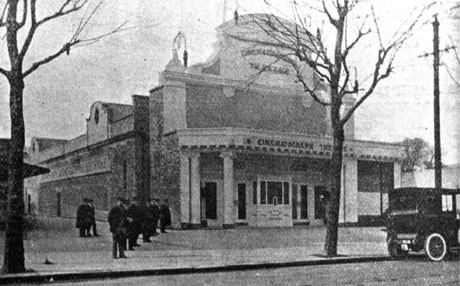
Shepherd's Bush Cinematograph circa 1910

The Palladium was completed on 3 March 1910 and was originally called the Shepherd's Bush Cinematograph Theatre. The original owner was Montagu Pyke; the building was designed by an unknown architect. The original seating capacity was 900.

From the beginning there were problems. In January 1921, the manager of the Cinematograph complained to Hammersmith Council – which owned the local electricity supply station – that there was too little power available to screen films, and that therefore the theatre had to close at 6.15 pm. He claimed compensation of £60 for loss of business.

In November 1923, the building reopened with 763 seats as the New Palladium (later called the Palladium, the Essoldo, the Classic, and finally the Odeon 2), designed by architect John Stanley Coombe Beard. Beard designed many cinemas in and around London, judged by one architectural historian as "excellent, if stylistically slightly eccentric".

During World War 2, the building narrowly escaped being hit by a flying bomb, which in 1944 hit the neighbouring Shepherd's Bush Pavilion, destroying the original interior. The Pavilion did not re-open until 1955.

The Palladium was modernised again in 1968 and the seating was reduced to 500; reopening was delayed by a fire. In 1972 the building was renamed The Classic.

The building was taken over by Odeon Cinemas in 1973 and renamed Odeon 2. However, it did not flourish and the cinema closed in December 1981 for the last time.

=== Walkabout era ===
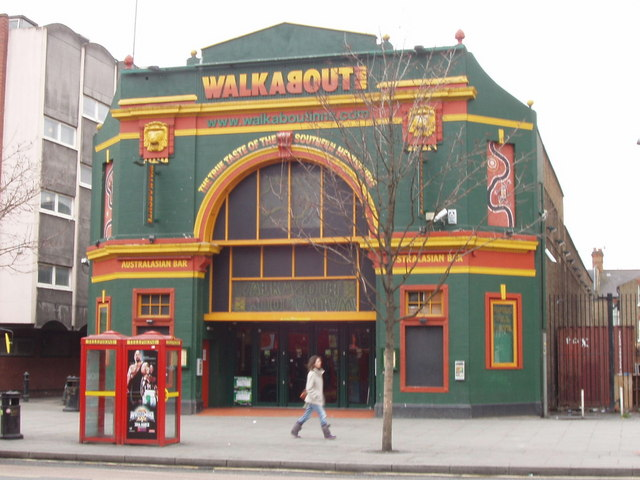
Walkabout Pub circa 2008

After standing empty for some time, the Palladium was eventually converted into a pub. Until October 2013 the building was owned and operated by the Walkabout chain of Australasian bars. Early in 2011 the owners applied for an extension to its opening hours, but the application was rejected owing to opposition from local residents. In October 2013, the Walkabout closed for good, and was sold to a developer.

== Demolition ==
As of March 2010, the Palladium was not a listed building, but it fell within the Shepherd's Bush Conservation Area, established by the London Borough of Hammersmith and Fulham to promote the protection of local buildings of historic interest, and improve the character of the neighbourhood.

In 2014, the building was the subject of a planning application to demolish it and replace it with a 16-storey block of flats, which was rejected.

A fresh planning application succeeded, and the building was demolished in 2019, replaced in 2021 with a new building which retained the original facade, restoring the building to its 1920s appearance, at least in part.

== See also ==
- History of Shepherd's Bush
- Shepherd's Bush Empire
- Shepherd's Bush Pavilion
