= Freedom (play) =

Freedom is a play first performed by an African cast at the Westminster Theatre, London in 1955. It is set in an imaginary West African country, Bokondo, under colonial rule, and concerns a nationalist independence movement.

The play was filmed in 1956 in Nigeria, with a large cast. The film's premiere was in Los Angeles, in February 1957.

== Background ==
The Westminster Theatre was owned at this period by the Westminster Memorial Trust, on behalf of Moral Re-Armament (MRA). The play was drafted at an MRA meeting in Caux, Switzerland in 1955, principally by Ifoghale Amata from Nigeria (Act 1), Manasseh Moerane from South Africa (Act 2), and Abayifaa Karbo from Ghana (Act 3).

== Performances ==
The play had a London run of about five nights at the Westminster Theatre, in August 1955. It then toured in Europe; and later in West Africa.

== Film version ==
The film version was promoted as African-made, though in fact the crew was not African. It was in colour, feature-length, and made in English: and it was dubbed into Kiswahili. While the film has been stated to be in Technicolor, the technical credits are for Eastman Color.

The cast included Manasseh Moerane, as Adamu, Chief Minister of Bokondo, Ifoghale Amata as Mutanda, the Nationalist revolutionary leader, and Lionel Jardine as Mr. Roland, administrator for the colonial power, Imperia. Jardine had been an administrator in British India.

Cameraman Rickard Tegström was involved in the making of Freedom. The technical credit as film editor was to Vernon Messenger. The MRA activist Peter James Sisam has a stills photographer credit. He gave "technical and logistical support" in Nigeria to the making of the film version.
