= Shepherd's Bush Pavilion =

Coordinates: 51.5040°N 0.2244°W

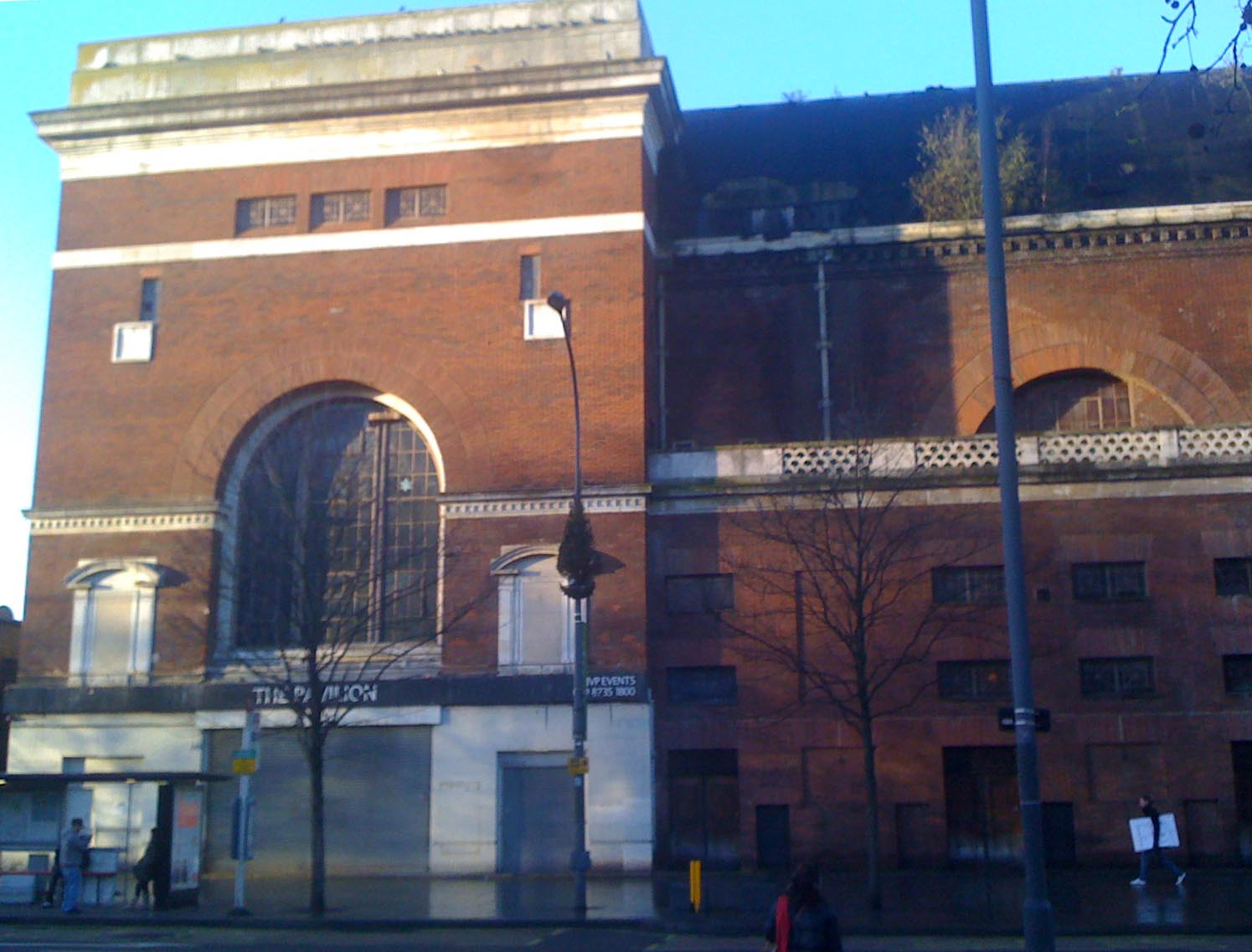
- The Shepherd's Bush Pavilion in 2011
- Interactive map of the Shepherd's Bush Pavilion area
- Former names: Gaumont Theatre; Odeon cinema Top Rank Bingo; Mecca Bingo

General information
- Type: Hotel; formerly a Cinema
- Architectural style: Edwardian, Second Empire
- Location: Shepherd's Bush, 58 Shepherd's Bush Green, London, England
- Current tenants: Dorsett Shepherd's Bush, London
- Completed: 1923, rebuilt 2012–2014
- Renovated: damaged in WWII, later renovated
- Destroyed: damaged in 1944 by flying bomb
- Demolished: largely demolished in 2012; facade alone retained
- Owner: Dorsett Hospitality International

Technical details
- Structural system: Brick, concrete

Design and construction
- Architect: Frank Verity
- Awards: RIBA London Street Architecture Award for the best London facade, 1923

Website
- www.shepherdsbushpavilion.com

References
- Listed Grade II

The Shepherd's Bush Pavilion is a Grade II listed building, currently a hotel, formerly a cinema and bingo hall, in Shepherd's Bush, London. Built in 1923 as a cinema, it was badly damaged by a flying bomb in 1944. In 1955, it was restored and re-opened, but it changed ownership a number of times, and eventually in 1983 became a bingo hall. The Pavilion closed its doors for good in 2001, and remained empty and disused for much of the next decade. In 2009, planning permission was granted for conversion into a luxury hotel. Demolition work began in 2012, with only a part of the building's façade retained. The re-built hotel, the Dorsett Shepherd's Bush, London, opened in 2014.

== History ==
=== Origins ===
The Pavilion was originally built as a cinema, designed by Frank Verity for Israel Davis. It opened in August 1923, when it won the RIBA London Street Architecture Award for the best London facade. The panel noted the "imposing structure of brick and stone in which the former material especially is used with great imagination". From the beginning, the project was very ambitious – the films were accompanied not by a mere piano but by the Pavilion Symphony Orchestra, and a sophisticated lighting system created colour effects during the films – such as blue lights for rain, or red for fire.

The interior was classical in style, using 3 shades of copper, and seated 2,000 spectators. It had no less than 2 miles of carpet and solid silver lamps for lighting, and was awarded a Bronze Medal by the Royal Institute of British Architects.

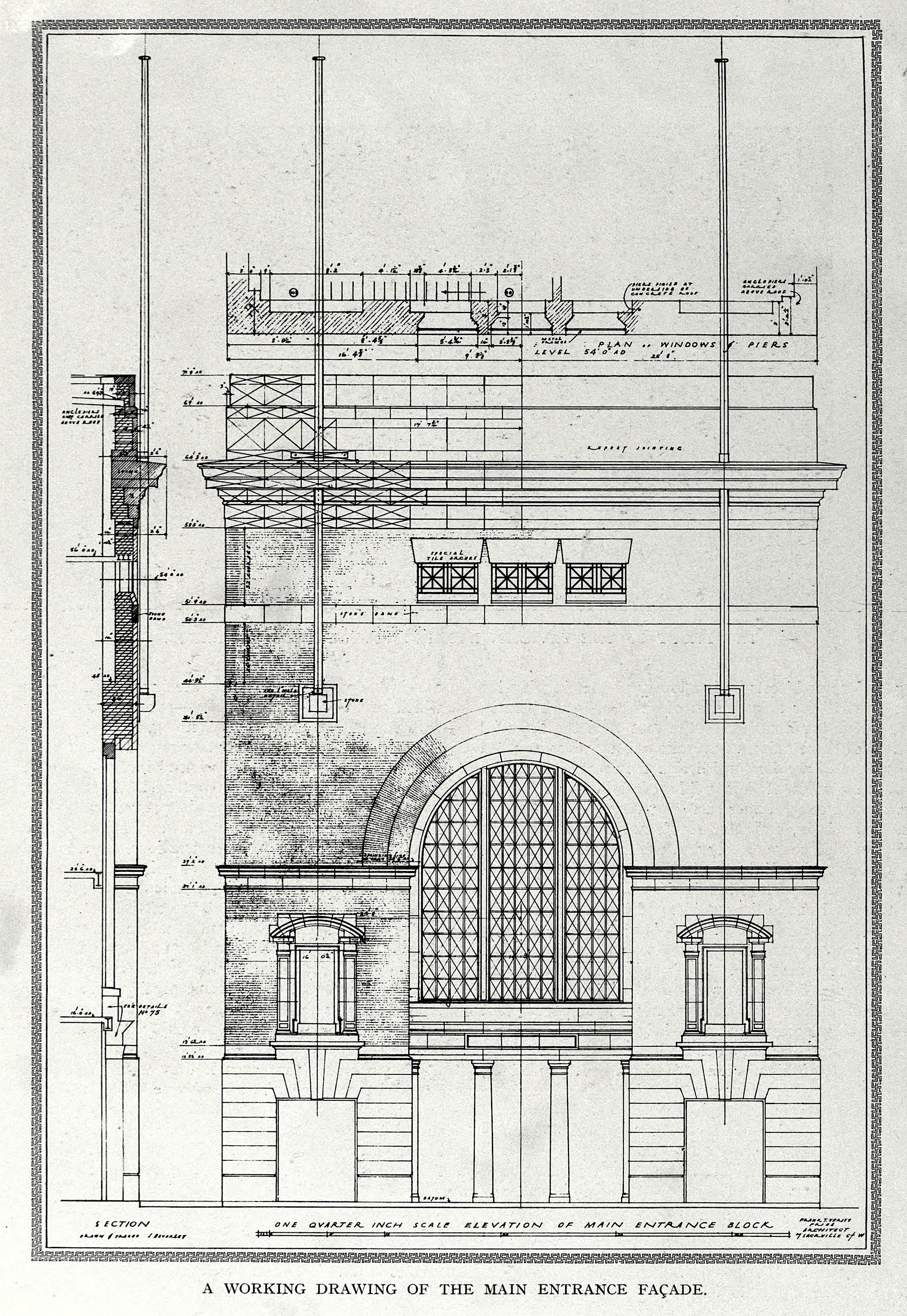
A work drawing of the building

=== WW2 ===
Much of the sumptuous interior work would be lost when the building was badly damaged by a flying bomb in 1944, towards the end of World War II, and the original interior was destroyed.

=== Modern era and decline ===
After the war, the Pavilion was repaired (though not entirely to the original design), and reopened in 1955 as the Gaumont Theatre. It was then closed again in 1969 for further refurbishment, when a new floor was installed, dividing the large open space into two levels – a cinema upstairs and a Bingo Club below.

In 1974, the Pavilion acquired a new status as a Grade II listed building although, given the war damage and subsequent alterations, little remained of the original interior design or layout.

In 1983, the cinema closed for the last time, leaving the bingo hall open for a while longer. However, in 2001 even the bingo hall closed, and the building fell into disuse.

=== Redevelopment as a hotel ===
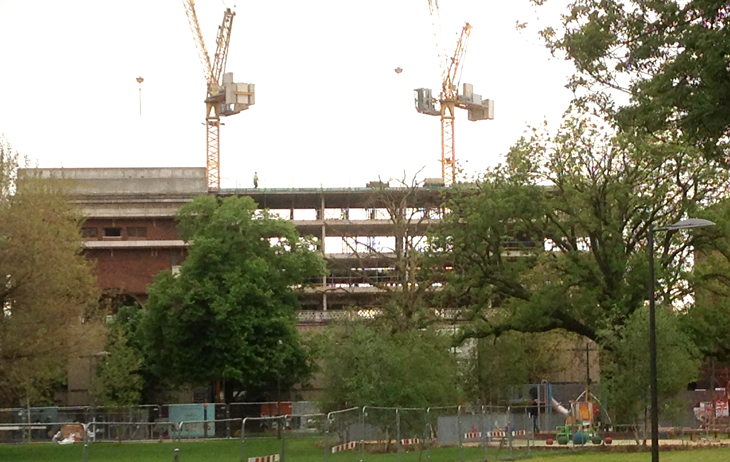
Shepherd's Bush Pavilion Hotel Under Construction in May 2013

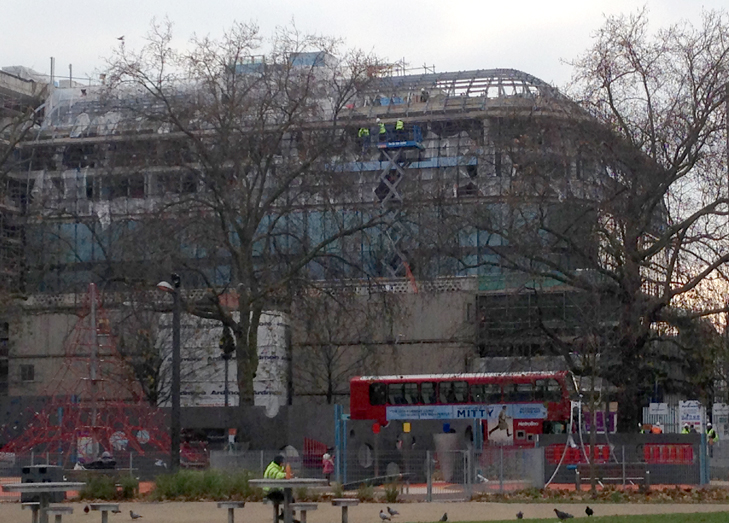
Shepherd's Bush Pavilion 10 December 2013

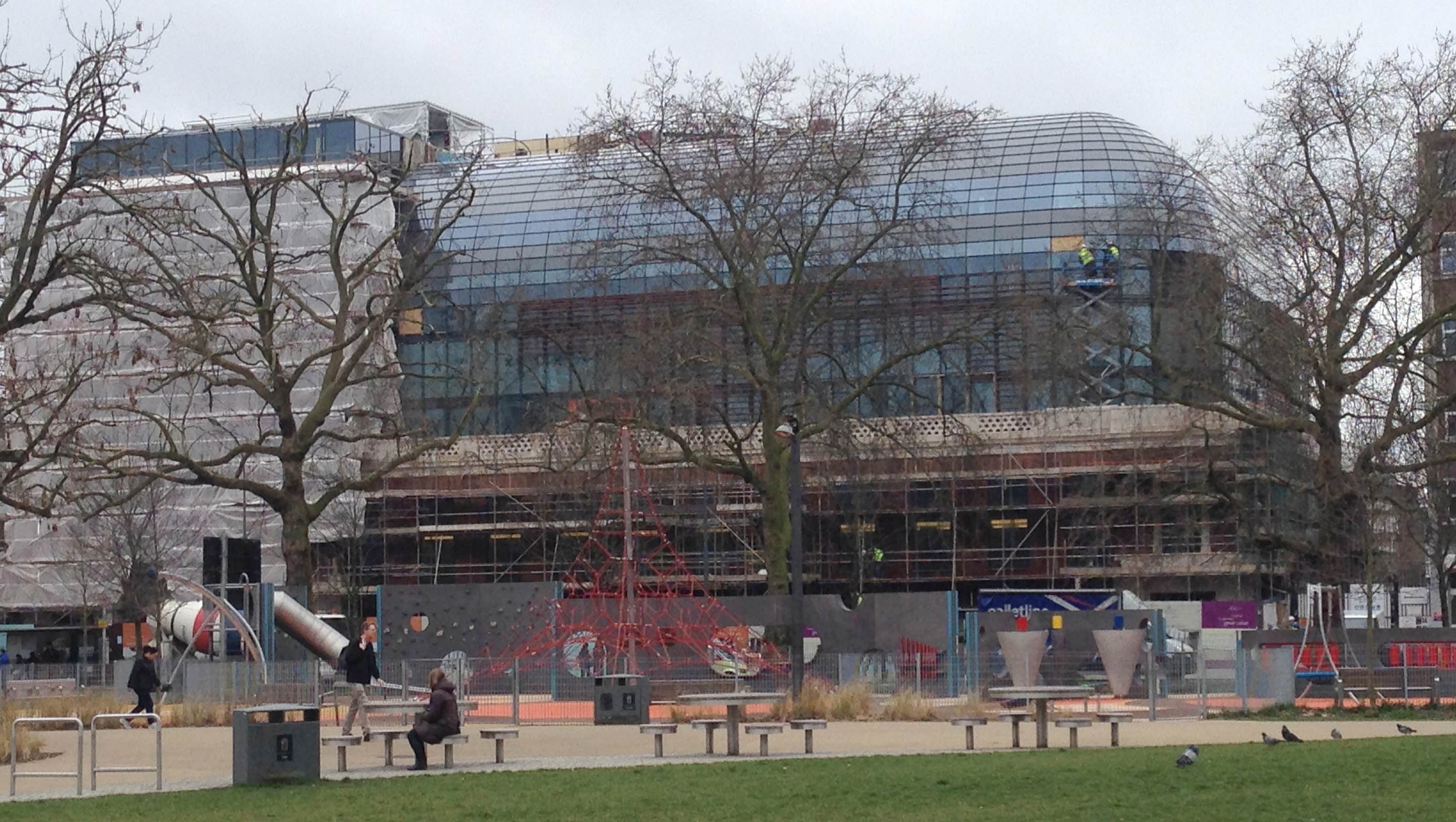
Shepherds Bush Pavilion in March 2014

In both 2004 and 2006, planning permission was given for conversion into a hotel, but investors withdrew from the project owing to the difficulty of converting the building, in particular the relatively small number of rooms, few of which would have enjoyed any natural daylight or views.

The building was left unoccupied and in disrepair for several years, prompting English Heritage to add it to its 'Building at Risk' register.

In 2009, planning permission was granted to convert the empty building into the 4 star Shepherds Bush Pavilion Hotel, designed by architects Flanagan Lawrence.

At the end of February 2012, it was reported that the £25 million conversion of the derelict building would begin in March 2012. In the summer of 2012, the building was largely demolished, retaining only the original facade. When completed the hotel would have 11 floors, and the existing curved roof would be replaced by a glass roof.

In September 2012, a planning variation was requested by the developers, to change the proposed development from a 242-room hotel to one with 322 smaller rooms. The proposed variation was opposed by local residents who feared that the fundamental character of the new building would be quite different from what was originally proposed.

The new hotel is to run by the Asia-based hotel group Dorsett Hospitality International, listed on the Hong Kong Stock Exchange. It opened in June, 2014.

== See also ==
- History of Shepherd's Bush
- Shepherd's Bush Palladium
- Shepherd's Bush Empire

== Bibliography ==
- Denny, Barbara, Hammersmith and Shepherd's Bush Past, Historical Publications Ltd, London (1995), ISBN 0-948667-32-X
