= O2 Forum Kentish Town =

Concert venue in Kentish Town, London, England

O_{2} Forum Kentish Town

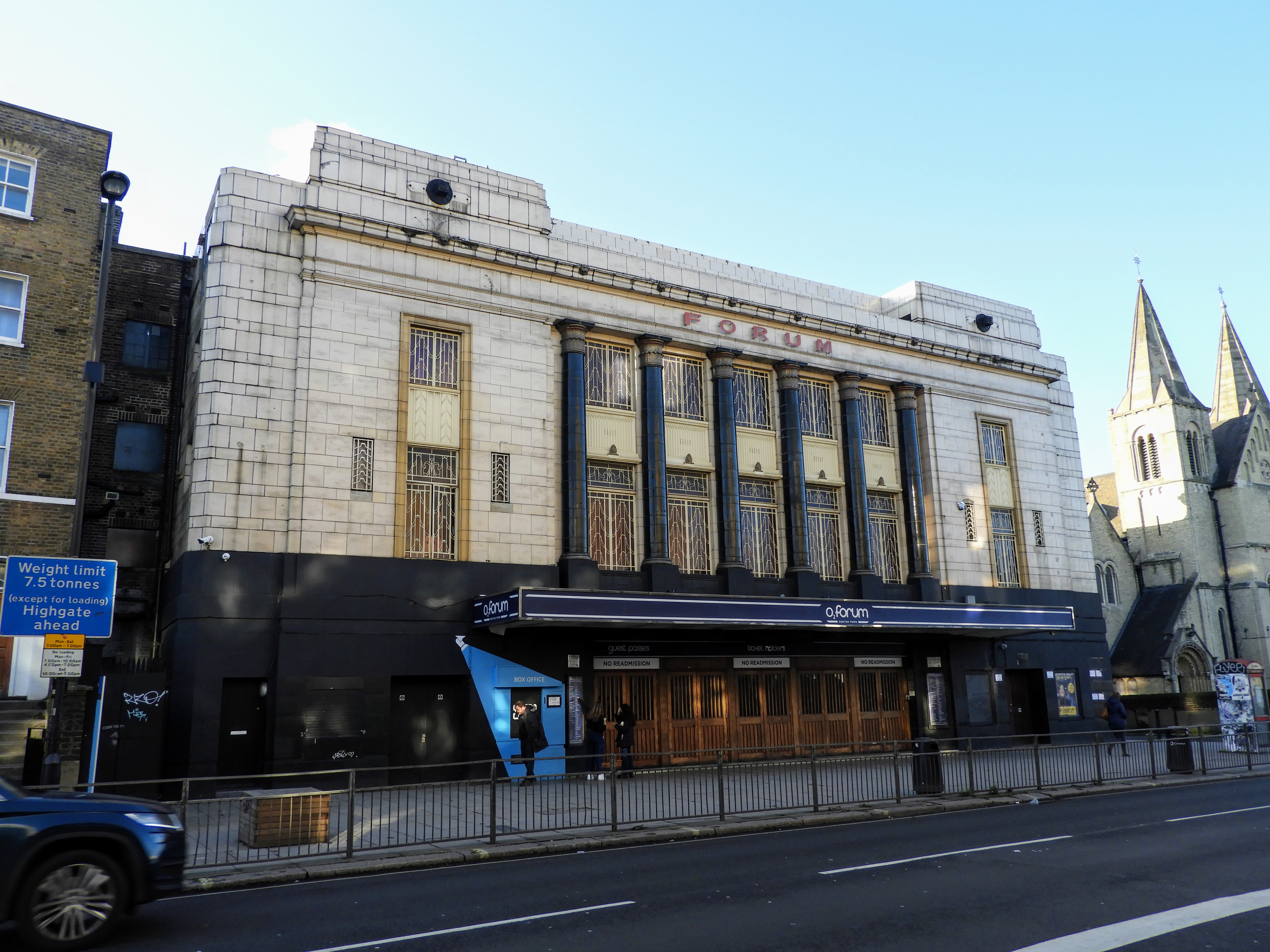
- Exterior of the venue (c. 2020)
- Interactive map of O_{2} Forum Kentish Town
- Former names: Kentish Town Forum Theatre (1934–1963); ABC Kentish Town (1963–1970); Forum Dancehall (1984–1985); Town & Country Club (1985–1993); London Forum (1993–2007); The Forum (2007–2009); HMV Forum (2009–2013); The Forum (2013–2015)
- Address: 9–17 Highgate Rd; London, England NW5 1JY
- Location: Kentish Town
- Coordinates: 51.5522°N 0.1422°W
- Owner: Academy Music Group
- Operator: Live Nation
- Capacity: 2,300
- Public transit: Kentish Town

Construction
- Opened: 17 December 1934
- Renovated: 1983; 1993; 2007
- Closed: 1970–1983
- Architect: J. Stanley Beard

Website
- Venue Website

The O_{2} Forum Kentish Town is a concert venue in Kentish Town, London, England, owned by Live Nation Entertainment and originally built in 1934.

== History ==
The venue was built in 1934 and was originally used as an art deco cinema. The venue was designed by J. Stanley Beard with the interior designed by William Robin Bennett. It featured a Compton organ. The venue opened on the 17th December 1934. Originally owned by Herbert Yapp, the venue was acquired by ABC Cinemas in 1935.

After the cinema was closed in 1970, the venue re-opened as a bingo hall and later became a music venue, known as the Forum Dancehall. In 1985 it became a live music venue under the name Town & Country Club.

The building became grade II listed in 1990.

In 1993, Mean Fiddler Music Group purchased the venue and renamed it the London Forum. The final show at the Town & Country Club was Van Morrison on 21 March 1993.

From 2009 to 2013 the venue was named the HMV Forum. In 2010 the building obtained a licence allowing the venue to stay open until 6am, for Friday night events.

In 2007, MAMA & Company purchased the Forum from Mean Fiddler and spent £1.5 million on renovations, increasing the capacity to 2,300. In 2015, the venue was acquired by Live Nation, and re-branded as O_{2} Forum Kentish Town as part of the O_{2} Academy Group.

The venue attracted protests in November 2025, after hosting a gig by Bob Vylan, in the aftermath of their controversial Glastonbury set. Opposing groups, Stop the Hate and Palestine Coalition, held counter protests, with a number of arrests made. Stop the Hate had previously attempted to get the show cancelled.

== Noted performers ==
- AJR
- 2face Idibia
- Alessi Rose
- Aleyna Tilki
- Alice in Chains
- Anitta
- Anthrax
- Apiwat Ueathavornsuk
- Arctic Monkeys
- Ateez
- Babymetal
- Bad Gyal
- The Bible (band)
- Biffy Clyro
- Big Country
- Björk (played her first solo concert in 1993)
- Bjorn Again
- Bon Jovi
- Billy Bragg
- Bruce Dickinson
- Built To Spill
- The B-52's
- Chance the Rapper
- Coldplay
- Conor McGregor
- The Corrs
- The Creatures
- The Cure (a secret gig with the name 5 Imaginary Boys)
- Cutting Crew
- Daði Freyr
- The Damned
- Danny Wilson
- Danzig
- Dare
- David Bowie
- Day6
- Debbie McGee
- Del Amitri
- Dendera
- Devo
- Dio
- DragonForce
- Drain Gang
- Eater (band)
- Ed Sheeran
- Eliza
- Eurythmics
- Fakemink
- Freya Skye
- Franz Ferdinand
- The Front Bottoms
- Fields of The Nephilim
- Fugazi
- Gorillaz
- Gustavo Cerati
- Gym Class Heroes
- Half Man Half Biscuit
- Hipsway
- Hothouse Flowers
- Hurts
- INXS
- It Bites
- Jack Garratt
- Jack White
- Jagged Edge
- James Brown
- Jamiroquai
- Jesus Jones
- Jet
- Joe Cocker
- Joost Klein
- John Martyn
- John Mayall's Bluesbreakers
- Joshua Bassett
- Justin Timberlake
- Keane
- Keith Richards
- Killing Joke
- KSI
- Lacuna Coil
- Lenny Kravitz
- Level 42
- Lindemann
- Lionel Richie
- Lovejoy (band)
- Lowlife (band)
- Machine Gun Kelly
- Manic Street Preachers
- Marillion
- The Mission
- Modern Baseball
- Modest Mouse
- Nekfeu
- The Neville Brothers
- Nelly Furtado
- New Found Glory
- Nina Simone
- Nine Inch Nails
- Nothing But Thieves
- Oasis
- Odd Eye Circle
- Oysterband
- Ozzy Osbourne
- Paul Rodgers
- Pixies
- PJ Harvey
- The Pogues
- Prince
- Pulp
- The Quireboys
- Reneé Rapp
- Robbie Williams
- Radiohead
- Rage Against the Machine
- Ramones
- The Replacements (band)
- Rihanna
- Robert Plant
- RØRY
- Rory Gallagher
- Scooter
- Siouxsie and the Banshees
- Skid Row
- Smashing Pumpkins
- Snow Patrol
- Sparks (band)
- Soundgarden
- Steve Earle
- Steve Harley and Cockney Rebel (1992)
- Steve Harley (as a 3-man acoustic set, 2012)
- Stiff Little Fingers
- Subcarpati
- Suede
- The Stranglers
- Those Damn Crows
- Throwing Muses
- Tokio Hotel
- Tom Jones
- Tom Meighan
- The Who
- Underworld
- UFO
- Yungblud
