= Alderson Burrell Horne =

British theatre director (1863–1953)

Alderson Burrell Horne (1863–1953) was a British theatre director, under the pseudonym Anmer Hall.

== Life ==
He was the son of Edgar Horne (1820–1905), and younger brother of William Edgar Horne; and was educated at Westminster School from 1876 to 1880. He entered Pembroke College, Oxford in 1884.

Horne was a solicitor, at 50 Lincoln's Inn Fields. He had a large house, Ditton Place, built near Balcombe, Sussex, in 1904, with a formal garden by Reginald Blomfield. In 1914 he was chairman of Morib Plantations, Ltd.

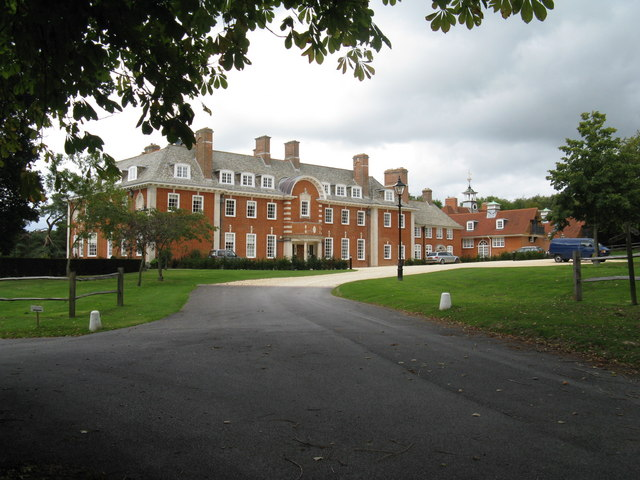
Ditton Place, now a school, in 2009

Beginning an involvement with theatre, initially as a backer, Horne ultimately became an actor-manager. He supported Johnston Forbes-Robertson in 1905 at the Scala Theatre, which was enlarged by F. T. Verity and continued to 1911, when it became a cinema. Again, in 1911, he supported John Eugene Vedrenne and Dennis Eadie, who took over the Royalty Theatre. He requested a curtain raiser from his friend A. A. Milne, around the beginning of 1914.

During World War I, Horne was involved in entertainments for the troops, organised with Lena Ashwell and the YMCA. He supported Nigel Playfair's takeover in 1918 of the Lyric Theatre, Hammersmith, with Arnold Bennett.

Horne in 1925 took over management of the Festival Theatre of the Cambridge University Amateur Dramatic Club. He brought in Tyrone Guthrie as resident director. That year, the company had a run of three weeks for James Bernard Fagan at the Oxford Playhouse, playing Ibsen, Somerset Maugham and Roland Pertwee.

The licensee of the Westminster Theatre from 1931 to 1947, Horne took leading roles in productions there, under the stage name Waldo Wright. He brought from Cambridge a company including Robert Eddison, Evan John, Flora Robson and Gillian Scaife. Early in his tenure at the Westminster, the overlapping company of the Group Theatre of London emerged, with outsiders such as Rupert Doone and Ormerod Greenwood. Horne directed The Dance of Death by W. H. Auden in its October 1935 production by the Group Theatre.

The Westminster Theatre was bought from Horne in 1946 by the Westminster Memorial Trust, who ran it on behalf of Moral Re-Armament. He died on 22 December 1953.

== Family ==
Horne married in 1887 Maud Porter, daughter of Frederick William Porter of Moyle Tower, Hythe. They had a son David Edgar Alderson Horne, known as an actor, and a daughter Janet Maud. Maud, who died in 1952, was a councillor for the St James ward in London, from 1925 to 1949.

Horne was married a second time, to Gillian Scaife, who survived him. She had children Christopher Scaife and Susan Scaife, mother of Sally Flemington.
