= Everyman Gerrards Cross =

Cinema in Buckinghamshire, England

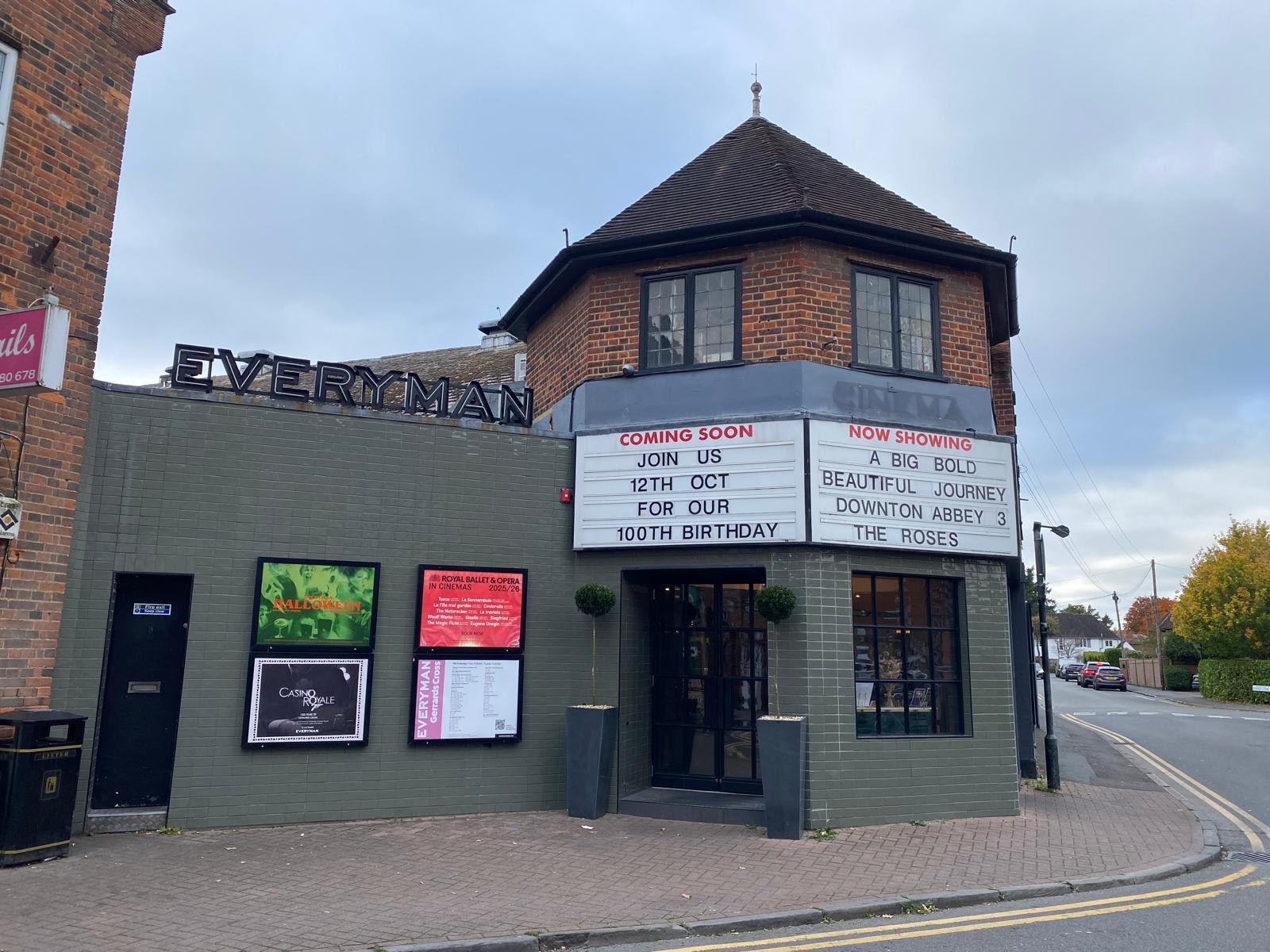
- The Everyman Gerrards Cross cinema on its 100th birthday, 12 October 2025
- Interactive map of Everyman Gerrards Cross
- Former names: The Playhouse
- Address: Ethorpe Crescent, Gerrards Cross, Buckinghamshire, SL9 8PN
- Coordinates: 51.588823°N 0.553073°W
- Owner: Everyman Cinemas
- Capacity: 452 (1925); 392 (1969); 386 and 213 (1979); 296 and 182 (2010); 117 and 87 (2015); 125, 87 and 42 (present)
- Type: Cinema

Construction
- Opened: 12 October 1925
- Renovated: 1950, 1969, 1979, 2000, 2015 and 2019
- Expanded: 1979 (twinned); 2019 (tripled)

Website
- Everyman Gerrards Cross

The Everyman Gerrards Cross is a cinema located in Gerrards Cross, Buckinghamshire, England. Originally known as The Playhouse, it has continually served Gerrards Cross as a cinema since it first opened in 1925 and is the oldest cinema in Buckinghamshire. It has been owned by several cinema chains and is currently operated by Everyman Cinemas.

== History ==
The Playhouse in 1969

=== The Playhouse (1925–1947) ===
The Playhouse was built in 1925 to the design of J. Stanley Beard, an illustrious cinema architect and resident of Gerrards Cross. It was located on Berwick Road (now Ethorpe Crescent). Originally, very lavish and elaborate designs were planned in 1923. However, these plans were superseded by more modest ones in 1925.

==== Architecture ====
According to a local guide at the time, the Playhouse was modelled "along the lines of that adjoining Buckingham Palace". Perhaps this regal inspiration was most encapsulated by the large Doric pillars that ran along one side of the auditorium.

Seating was provided for 452, all stalls, with four boxes to the rear. There was a unique standing lobby that ran parallel to the auditorium. This allowed up to 150 people a place to wait to be seated. The screen was 16 by 12 feet (4.9 m × 3.7 m) and the proscenium was 25 feet (7.6 m) wide with a stage underneath it. There were footlights across the stage which cast light onto the curtains which were mauve and old gold. There were also dressing rooms to the right of the stage, as the cinema would occasionally host live performances. One of these was the Gerrards Cross Operatic Society who used to perform regularly before the Second World War.

The cinema was opened in the days before the widespread exhibition of talking pictures, so it was built with an orchestra pit at the front of the auditorium and each performance was accompanied by musicians.

The entrance foyer was fairly small and octagonal. It had a high ceiling and a terrazzo floor. The box office was located to the right, and the standing lounge on the left. There was also a direct entrance to an adjacent building where there was a café on the ground floor and a dancehall upstairs. To the rear of the building there was a car park for up to 30 cars.

Externally the building had an octagonal entrance tower that was constructed with three Georgian style entrance doors which were adorned with neon lights. The tower was engraved with the words "Picture Play House" in the masonry. The word "Playhouse" was also displayed in large neon letters.

==== Charles Cheshir ====
The first owner of the cinema was the ubiquitous Charles F Cheshir (1877–1954). He had previously been the proprietor of the first cinema in Beaconsfield, the Picture House, which remained until 1927. He was also the proprietor of the Royalty cinema in Bourne End and even unsuccessfully proposed to build another cinema in Chalfont St Peter in 1937. The general manager of the Playhouse was his son Charles "Eric" Cheshir (1902–1991). The Cheshirs ensured films changed three times a week, with a regular Saturday morning children's club.

==== Opening night ====
On its opening night, 12 October 1925, the Playhouse exhibited I'll Show You the Town, a silent film starring Reginald Denny and Marian Nixon. The programme was opened with Madama Ada Davis singing the British national anthem, God Save the King and also included Pathé newsreels and Pictorials.

==== Price of admission ====
The price of admission in 1931 was:

Seating	Price in 1931 (£sd)	Equivalent in 2026 (£)
Matinee front stalls	8d.	£2.90
Matinee rear stalls	1/3	£5.44
Evening front stalls	1/10	£7.98
Evening rear stalls	2/4	£10.16
Private boxes for four	12/6	£54.41

=== Southan Morris and Essoldo Playhouse (1947–1969) ===
The Playhouse was sold to Southan Morris (S.M. Super Cinemas, Ltd.) in 1947. Three years later, in 1950, the new owners undertook several interior alterations to the cinema. These included removing the boxes, re-raking the stalls floor and installing new seats. The Playhouse is set a few yards back from the high street, so a new continuous posterboard was erected to draw attention to the cinema from the main road. In 1954, S.M. Super Cinemas, Ltd. was acquired by Essoldo Cinemas. The Playhouse was acquired by Essoldo as part of the buyout. However, the cinema remained as the Essoldo Playhouse until 1969. At some point during this period the neighbouring dancehall and café were sold off, as today they are flats, a takeaway pizza restaurant and a salon.

=== Essoldo (1969–1972) ===
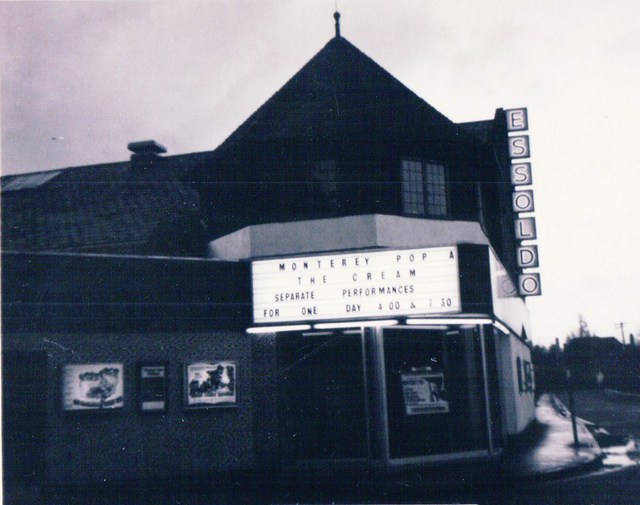
Essoldo Cinema in 1971 following an extensive refurbishment

In 1969, the cinema was closed and heavily refurbished. The façade was drastically altered into a more modern style. The original entrance doors and arches were removed. Two sets of doors were replaced with more conventional glass ones and a large floor to ceiling window was installed. The external brickwork was tiled over. A new readograph was installed above the entrance displaying what films were showing. The original proscenium was removed along with the orchestra pit. The auditorium was painted black and 392 new seats were installed with red carpets and drapes to complement the décor. The kiosk was relocated to the left of the foyer and the standing lounge was turned into store rooms. The building was also given central heating for the first time.

Seven light boxes were also installed along the side of the building displaying the new Essoldo name, with dark blue letters on an orange background. The Playhouse name was dropped and it became known as the Essoldo Gerrards Cross.

The new Essoldo reopened on 29 November 1969, with a charity performance of the Battle of Britain, starring Laurence Olivier. The guest of honour to the event was Air Chief Marshal Sir Gareth Clayton of the RAF.

=== Classic and Cannon (1972–1992) ===
The Classic in 1983

In 1972, the Essoldo chain was bought by the Classic Cinemas Ltd. chain, and the cinema changed hands again. Externally the changes were minimal, with just a simple renaming. The Classic reopened on 26 March 1972 showing Paint Your Wagon, starring Lee Marvin, Clint Eastwood and Jean Seberg.

However, perhaps the most prodigious alteration to the cinema came in 1979. After plans to build a large 304 seat auditorium in the car park in 1973 and a more modest 140 seat mini auditorium in 1978 were denied on environmental and car parking grounds, the cinema needed to keep up and compete with the rise in popularity of multiplex cinemas. In 1979, plans were granted to allow a second auditorium to be added in the roof of the building. Construction works were undertaken and the second theatre was added above the rear of the original auditorium, facing the opposite direction. The interior layout was vastly altered to incorporate the new design, including the complete removal of the original projection box. This was relocated in a fairly unusual setup in the centre of the building. One projector, serving screen 1, the original auditorium, is a short throw from the screen. Directly above it, the projector for screen 2 faces the opposite way. The new seating capacities were 386 (screen 1) and 213 (screen 2).

In late 1985, Classic Cinemas was sold to Cannon and the cinema became a Cannon cinema.

=== MGM and ABC (1992–2000) ===
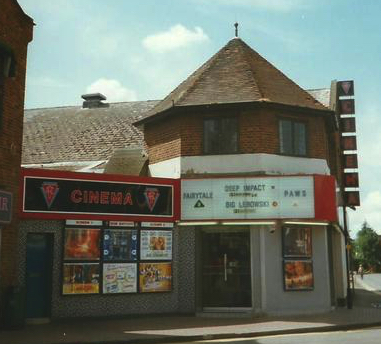
ABC Gerrards Cross in 1998

In 1992, Cannon was bought by MGM and once again the cinema was renamed. In 1995, the cinema was taken over by ABC Cinemas. The cinema exterior was altered slightly, with a new red canopy. The large floor to ceiling window was removed and a new box office was added in the recess where the window once stood. The colour scheme in the screens was golden.

The life of the ABC was fairly short lived as in 2000 ABC was merged with ODEON Cinemas by its owner Cinven.

=== ODEON (2001–2015) ===
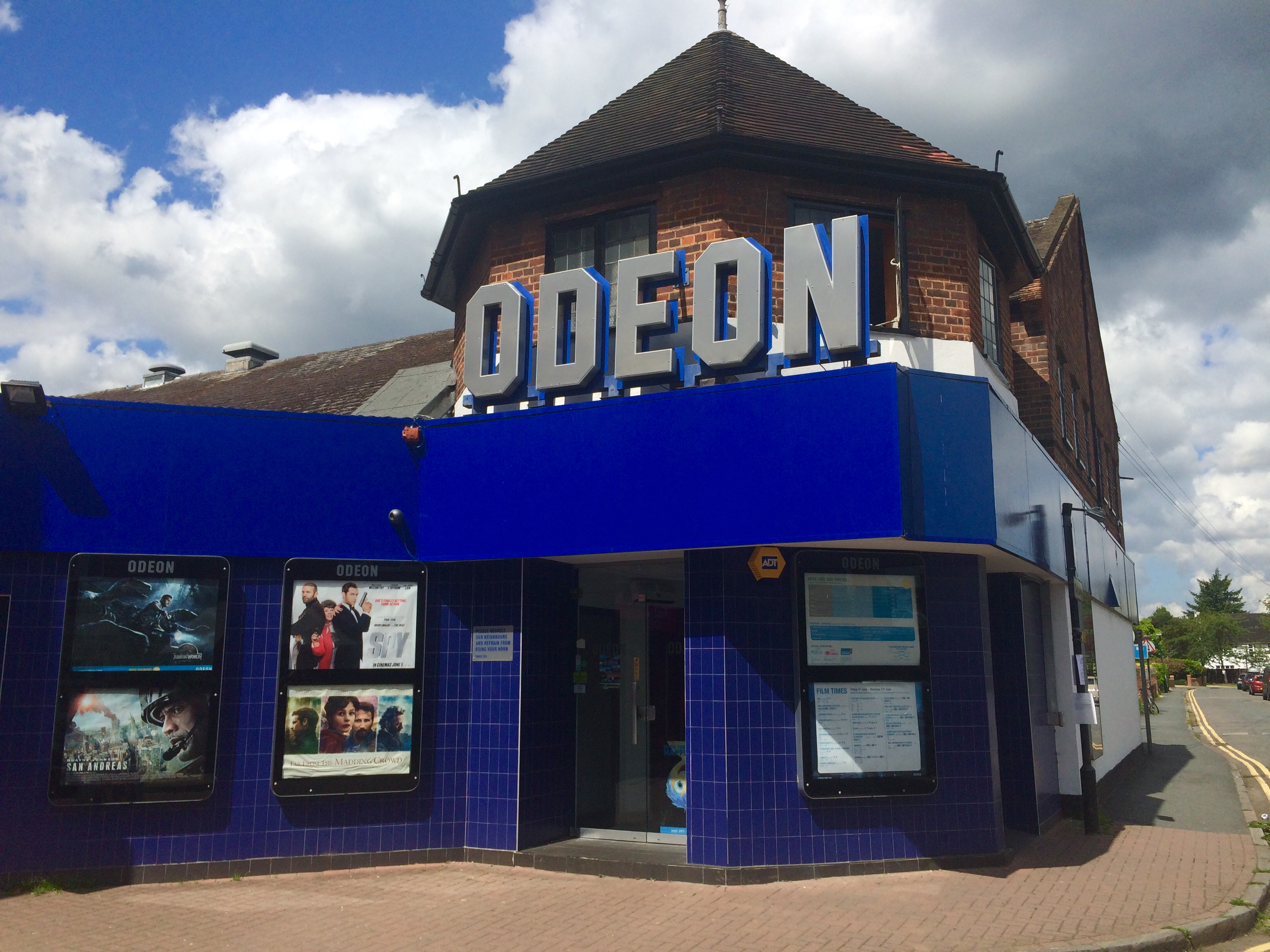
The ODEON in 2015 shortly before becoming Everyman

When the ABC Gerrards Cross was rebranded as ODEON a £250,000 refurbishment was undertaken. Firstly, the cinema was given disabled access for the first time in screen 1. Secondly, a new larger food concessions area was created by taking out a few rows from the back of screen 1. The exterior was also renovated. The tiles originally added in the 1960s were covered with navy blue tiles and large neon ODEON letters were added.

In 2009, ODEON Gerrards Cross had its first digital projector installed, with 3D capability. In 2011, it was made fully digital, with the ability to air live shows from venues such as the Royal Opera House, the National Theatre and the Metropolitan Opera House.

In April 2015, it was announced that Everyman Cinemas were in negotiations to purchase ODEON Gerrards Cross along with three other ODEON Cinemas. The ODEON was closed on 6 August 2015. The new owners immediately began extensive refurbishment works.

== Everyman (2015–present) ==
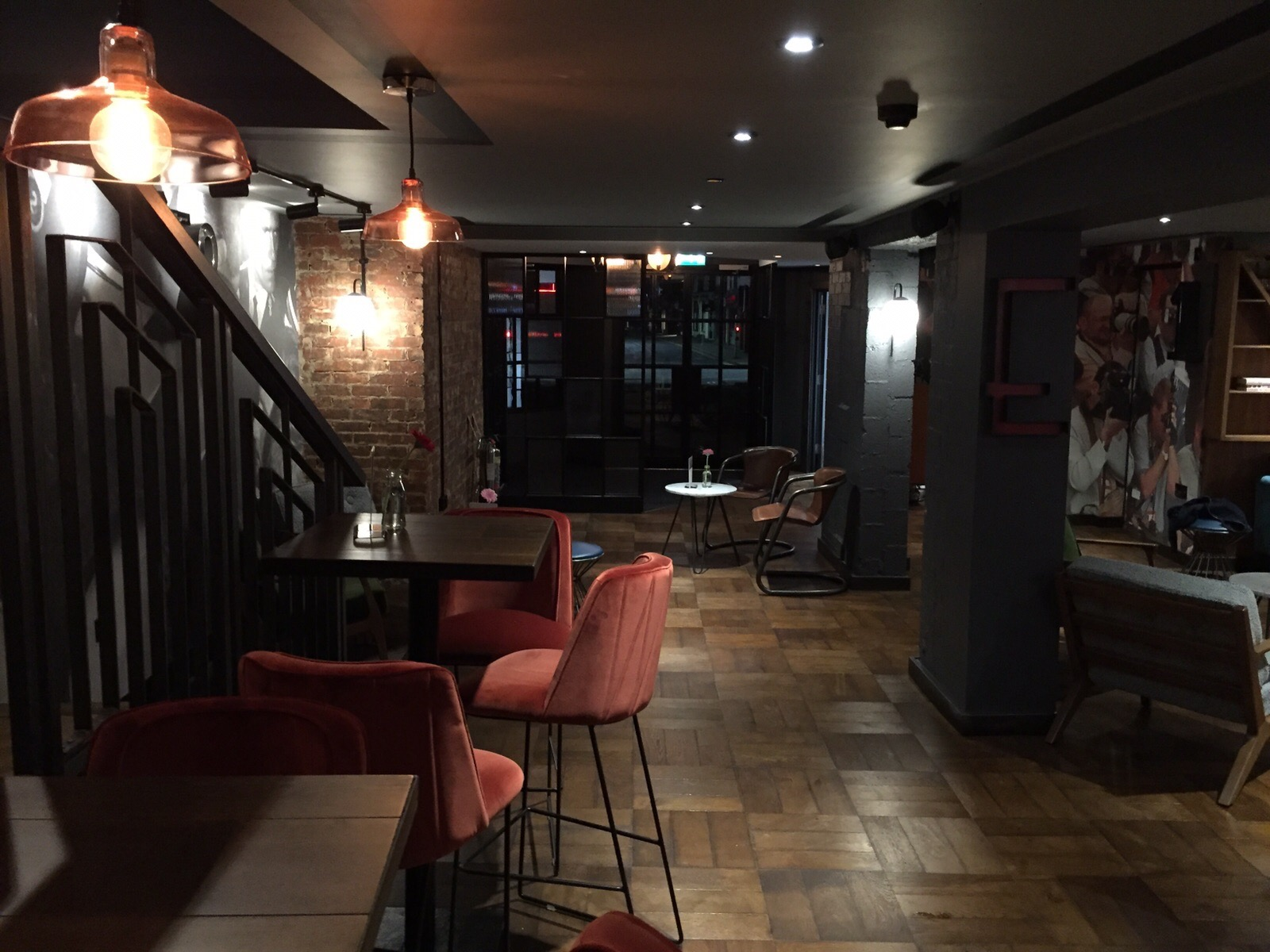
The new larger foyer looking towards the entrance doors

After 11 weeks of refurbishment, the Everyman Gerrards Cross reopened on 23 October 2015, just over 90 years after it first opened. On its opening night the cinema exhibited Macbeth, starring Michael Fassbender, and The Martian, starring Matt Damon. The building had been changed substantially to fit into the new Everyman style. Externally the canopy that was added in 1969 was removed and a new readograph was installed which emphasises the octagonal shape of the tower. A new neon Everyman sign was installed, reminiscent of the original Playhouse sign from years ago. The cinema featured an unconventional exterior décor of black and white photographs of paparazzi, however, this has now been changed to more conventional dark green tiles.

The external refurbishment has made the façade look very similar to how it looked when the cinema was the Playhouse between 1925–1969. The planning applications show that Everyman intended to restore some of the building's original external features, including the original entrance doors, however "the round-headed doorways are no longer in situ and, as such, it is not possible to restore these original features as Everyman had hoped." The planning statement also demonstrated that Everyman planned to undertake the "removal of the blue tiling to reveal the brick frontage" which would have been "made good and repointed." However, once the work was undertaken, Everyman discovered that "unfortunately, since planning permission was granted, it has become apparent that the existing brickwork behind the blue tiles is not in a sufficient state to be usable for a new shopfront".

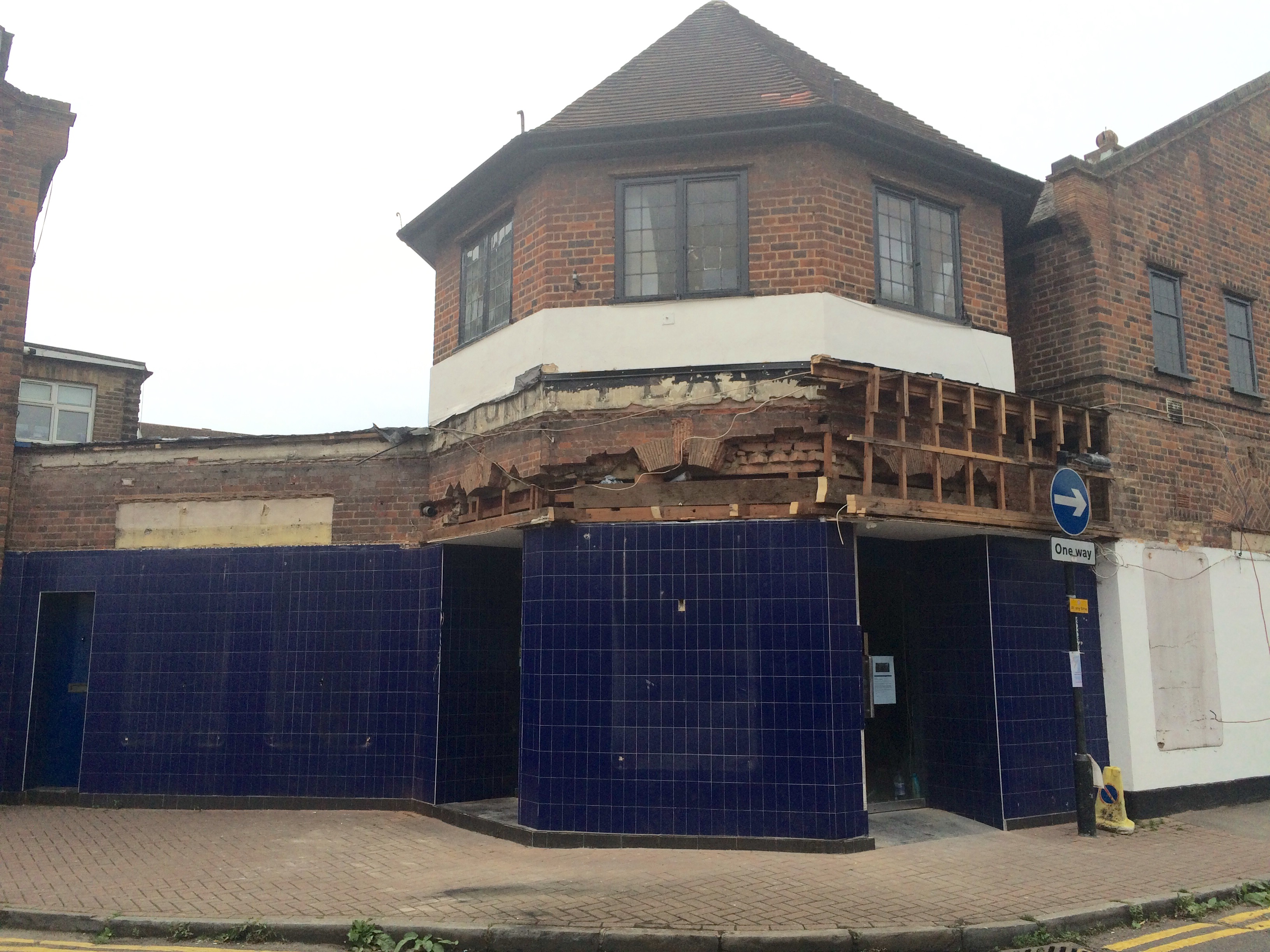
The cinema during renovation in 2015, showing the damage sustained from its many alterations

Internally, the building was also altered dramatically. The wall at the back of screen 1 was moved into the auditorium approximately 10 feet (3.0 m), meaning a reduced capacity but a larger foyer. Several walls in the foyer were also removed to increase the overall size. The new foyer has many new seating areas, something its previous incarnations lacked. The new theme is comparable to that of a relaxed bar, and fits into the boutique category that Everyman markets its cinemas as.

The theatre style seats in the auditoria were removed and replaced with sofas and armchairs, a common theme within the Everyman chain. The new capacity of 115 and 87 seats greatly differed from its previous capacity of 296 and 182.

=== Screen 3 ===
In January 2019, plans were approved to create a third screen in the car park of the cinema. After a few months of construction and a brief closure, the Everyman Gerrards Cross reopened in June 2019 with three screens, almost exactly 40 years after it was twinned in 1979. The new auditorium, which sits neatly in a space between two existing extensions on the side of the building, is approximately 55 feet (17 m) by 26 feet (7.9 m) and houses enough space for a small 43 seat screen. The bar area was moved approximately 90 degrees to accommodate the new entrance to screen 3 and a new, bigger kitchen was also constructed in the extension. The screen boasts a new Sony 4K projector, which has a higher resolution than the older 2K NEC projectors which serve Screens 1 and 2. It is also not located in the original projection room.

== In popular culture ==
The Playhouse in 1968.

The Everyman Gerrards Cross is just 3½ miles (5.6 km) away from Pinewood Studios and it was selected to feature in a few films over the years. In the opening scene of Carry on Camping in 1969, the exterior of the building is shown in its original splendour. The scene where they are watching Nudist Paradise was also filmed at the Playhouse. The cinema also featured in the 1968 film Prudence and the Pill in a scene where Grace and Henry Hardcastle decide to go to the pictures but change their mind just outside The Playhouse cinema. The neon "Playhouse" is clearly pictured in the scene. This cinema was also used as a set in season two of the 2022 television series Heartstopper, where Tao Xu (William Gao) and Elle Argent (Yasmin Finney) have their first date.

== Bibliography ==
- Tapsell, Martin (1983). "Gerrards Cross". Memories of Buckinghamshire's Picture Palaces. Mercia Cinema Society. pp. 37–40. ISBN 094640603-0.
- Eyles, Allen (1985). "Austral/Embassy". Cinemas of Hertfordshire. Hertfordshire Publications. pp. 44–45. ISBN 095421890-6.
