= Peter James Sisam =

English photographer and film director (1914–2015)

Peter James Sisam (19 December 1914 – 20 April 2015) was an English photographer and film director. From his undergraduate days, when he joined the Oxford Group, he was involved with the Moral Re-Armament movement.

== Life ==
He was born on 19 December 1914, the son of Walter Sisam (1882–1943) and his wife Catherine Nellie Fincher, and was educated at King Edward VI School, Stratford-upon-Avon. He matriculated at St Peter's Hall, Oxford in 1933, and read English Literature. His involvement with the Oxford Group came about through conversation with Kenneth Prebble. He left with a pass degree.

Sisam was given a chance to work in film, as a volunteer, by Eric Parfit. It was on Bridgebuilders, about the Oxford Group outreach and anti-communist mission in Scandinavia. It led to further work in 1937 on Youth Marches On, set in Canada and England.

At the beginning of World War II, Sisam was rejected for military service on health grounds. He worked in London for the Civil Defence Force. The shortage of film work led him to learn photography as a profession. After the war he was editor of New World News, an MRA magazine established in 1948.

During the 1960s Sisam made films for the Foreign Office. He then had four years making films for the educational publisher Macmillan.

He died on 20 April 2015, aged 100.

== Films ==
- 1957 Freedom, with Rickard Tegström. The film was based on a 1955 play of the same name, performed at the Westminster Theatre, and informed by Moral Re-Armament (MRA) beliefs. With an African cast, it toured Europe, on funds raised by the MRA. It was filmed in Nigeria in 1956, with a large cast.
- 1960 The Crowning Experience, based on the life of Mary McLeod Bethune
- 1974 Belfast Report, director; executive producer Hannen Foss, Foss Films for New Ireland Film Productions
- 1974 Crossroad, director; with Juliet Boobbyer, Ailsa Hamilton and Ronald Mann
- 1980 One Word of Truth, director, with Rickard Tegström, producers Ailsa Hamilton, Harald Wettefors, Harry Howlett

== Family ==
Sisam married in 1976 Margaret Honor Barnes, daughter of Anthony Charles Barnes OBE and his wife Honor Dorothea Coote, and they settled in Marlow, Buckinghamshire. They had no children.

Kenneth Sisam was a relation. Peter Sisam's paternal grandfather was John Leonard Sisam (1845–1921), son of Henry Sisam (1814–1870). Three of Henry Sisam's sons had emigrated from Arrow, Warwickshire to New Zealand in 1862, on the Matilda Wattenbach, the youngest being Alfred John Sisam, Kenneth's father.
