= Carlton Theatre =

Theatre in London, England

Coordinates: 51.5087°N 0.1323°W

Empire Haymarket
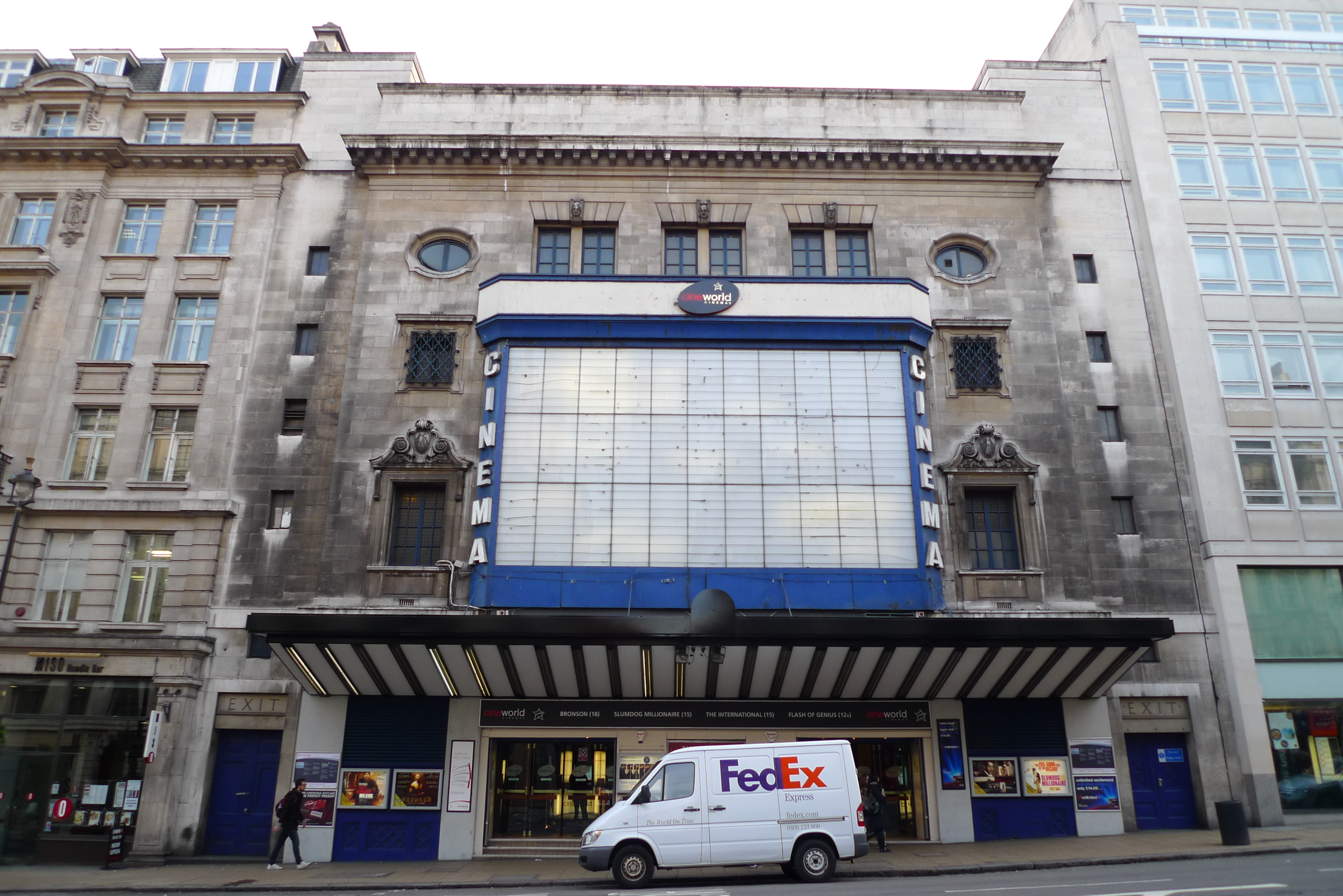
- As Cineworld Haymarket in 2009
- Interactive map of Empire Haymarket
- Former names: Carlton Theatre
- Address: 63-65 Haymarket
- Location: Central London
- Owner: The Crown Estate

Construction
- Built: 1927
- Renovated: 1979
- Closed: 2023
- Architect: Frank Verity

The Carlton Theatre was a London West End dual-purpose theatre-cum-cinema built in 1927 for Adolph Zukor's Paramount Pictures. It continued in use as a cinema as the Empire Haymarket until its closure in May 2023.

It was designed by Frank Verity and Sam Beverley in Italian and Spanish Renaissance architectural style with a total seating capacity is 1,150 and a dual theatre or cinema capability. It is located at 63-65 Haymarket, London, SW1 and was built on the site of Anglesea Yard, a former coaching inn.

It opened on 27 April 1927 with the successful musical play Lady Luck by Firth Shephard and starring Laddie Cliff. In 1933 it staged another stage success, a run of Bitter Sweet by Noël Coward.

The Carlton Theatre was wired for sound in 1929 and increasingly went over to being used as a full-time cinema.

It was originally built and owned by Paramount Pictures and was operated by them until 1954 when it was leased to Twentieth Century Fox as their West End showcase for CinemaScope films.

Fox continued to operate the Carlton until 1977 when they withdrew from cinema operations in London (they had also run the Rialto, Coventry Street). The cinema was taken over by Classic and the former stage area was sold for demolition and redevelopment. The auditorium was divided into three screens and reopened on 11 January 1979 as the Classic Haymarket. Various changes in ownership resulted in name changes to Cannon, MGM, Virgin, UGC and Cineworld Haymarket.

Empire Cinemas took over ownership in 2017. The Empire Haymarket permanently closed in May 2023.

It was listed Grade II on the National Heritage List for England in October 2018.
