= John Stanley Coombe Beard =

English architect

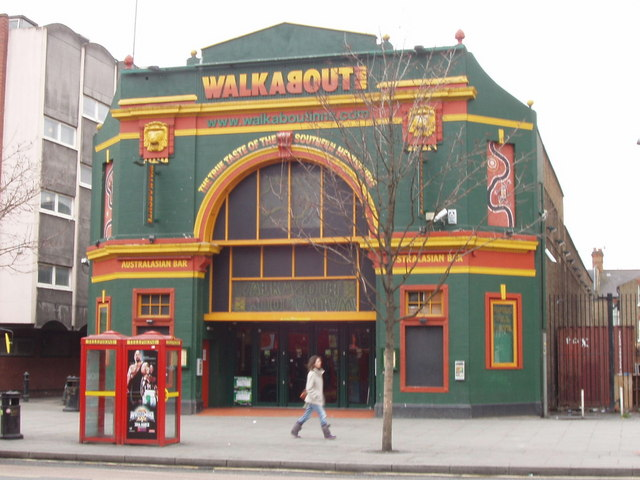
Former New Palladium, Shepherd's Bush, photographed in 2008 when it was an Australian-themed pub

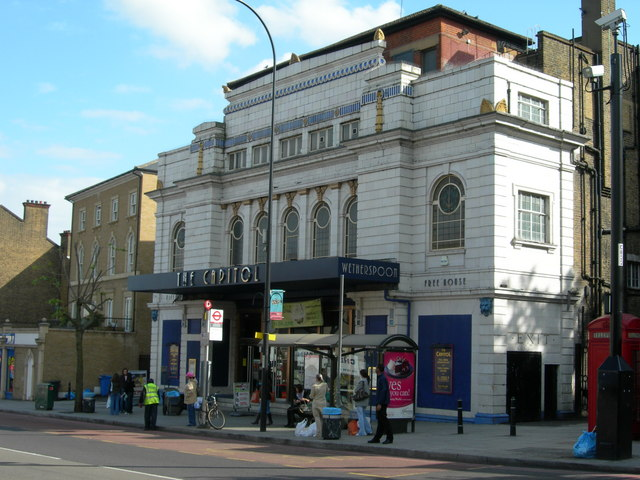
Former Capitol Cinema, Forest Hill

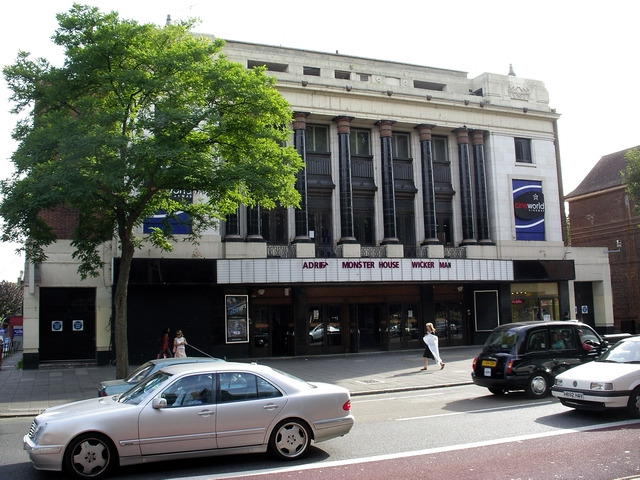
Former Forum Cinema, Ealing, in 2006

John Stanley Coombe Beard FRIBA (17 July 1890 – 1970), known professionally as J. Stanley Beard, was an English architect known for designing many cinemas in and around London.

== Biography ==
Beard was born in 1890, son of Percy Edward Beard of Essex. He was educated at King Alfred's School, Wantage, Berkshire.

He was elected LRIBA in 1925 and FRIBA in 1927. He was in partnership with Alfred Douglas Clare, as J Stanley Beard & Clare until Clare's death in July 1936, and after that with Walter Robert Francis Bennett, who became the senior partner in 1947. The company became J Stanley Beard Bennett Wilkins & Partners in 1960 (later simply Beard Bennett Wilkins & Partners) after absorbing Ralph Roland Wilkins.

In July 1937, when he was living in Hampstead, a telephone call made by his wife about an attempted burglary resulted in the first arrest attributable to the new 999 emergency number.

Beard became a Justice of the Peace. He retired in 1963. In retirement, he restored the gardens at Compton Acres in Poole, Dorset.

One architectural historian has judged Beard's cinemas as "excellent, if stylistically slightly eccentric".

== Works ==
=== As J. Stanley Beard and Clare ===
Beard and Clare designed numerous cinemas in and around London, including:

Palace, Kentish Town (1913): The Palace, later the Gaumont, Kentish Town, opened in December 1913 with 1,200 seats. It was baroque in style, with a terra-cotta façade rich in detail and a panelled auditorium with columns topped by nude statues. It became part of the Provincial Cinematograph Theatres circuit in 1920 and Gaumont in 1929. It was renamed in 1948 and closed in 1959. The building was partially demolished to build a warehouse; the rest of the auditorium is now Camden Law Centre. The façade was removed and is now the entrance to the Camden Community Health Council.

Majestic, Clapham (1914): The Majestic, later the Gaumont, Clapham, had 1,562 seats and provision for an orchestra as well as a small organ, later replaced with a 3-manual Compton. The entrance was squeezed between two shops; the auditorium ran parallel to the street in the rear, and had a dome which could be opened to vent cigarette smoke. It became part of the Provincial Cinematograph Theatres circuit in 1928 and Gaumont in 1929. In 1940–41 the cinema was closed to repair bomb damage. It closed for good in November 1960; the stage became a recording studio and the auditorium, after being used as storage for many years, became a bingo hall and then a nightclub.

Palace Theatre, Wandsworth (1920): The Palace Theatre, later the Gaumont Theatre, Wandsworth, opened in December 1920 with 1,307 seats. It was Greek Revival in style. For its fourth anniversary, a 2-manual Compton organ was installed. Originally independent, it became part of the United Picture Theatres circuit in 1928 and Gaumont in 1930. It was closed during World War II from 1940 to 1942 as a money-saving measure. Around 1956, the entrance was modernised. The cinema closed in February 1961 and became a bingo hall until 1979. From 1982 to 1992 it was a church, then a nightclub, first the Theatre and then the Palais, which has now closed.

Palmadium Cinema, Palmers Green (1920): The Palmadium Cinema, later the Gaumont, Palmers Green, opened in December 1920. It had 2,188 seats and a cinema organ and in addition to the balcony there were a dress circle with 7 boxes on either side, and a tea terrace from which box patrons could take their teas into the boxes. There was a fully equipped stage, and an organ in the orchestra pit. The style was Beaux Arts, and the façade, with a billiard hall and shops on either side as part of the same scheme, was white ceramic with red brickwork and apple-green tiles around the entrance. It was acquired by Gaumont in 1928, renamed in 1951 and closed in 1961 and has been demolished.

St. James' Picture Theatre, Westminster (1922): St. James' Picture Theatre, Westminster, was converted from St. Peter's Chapel, originally the Charlotte Chapel, built by the Reverend Dr William Dodd in 1766. It reopened as a cinema in April 1923. Beard added a new corner entrance with a cupola and pediments across the top on each side. The interior was Classical, with four private boxes provided at the request of the Royal Family; it was near Buckingham Palace and the Prince of Wales, especially, frequently saw films there. In 1931 it was reconverted into the Westminster Theatre, the crypt being used for the dressing rooms, green room and bar. The building was extensively remodelled in 1966 as the Westminster Theatre Arts Centre and was largely destroyed by fire during demolition in 2002. It has been replaced by a new housing and arts complex, but the performance spaces have yet to open.

Prince of Wales Cinema, Lewisham (1922): The Prince of Wales Cinema, Lewisham, was Beard's 27th cinema, and opened in October 1922 as the Prince of Wales Picture Playhouse; it was renamed after being taken over by ABC in 1933. Beard retained the rear and south side walls of the Electric Palace, the older cinema previously on the site. The style was neo-classical, with oak panelling in the foyer and auditorium; the facade was of white glazed tile with blue and gold accents. It seated 1,347. There was a stage 10 feet deep and four dressing rooms, and in the 1920s there were variety performances and live broadcasts by the BBC and recordings of community sing-alongs to Frank Westfield's orchestra. It was the first cinema in Lewisham to feature sound. It closed in 1959 and has been demolished.

New Palladium, Shepherd's Bush (1923): The New Palladium in Shepherd's Bush, later the Palladium, the Essoldo, the Classic, and Odeon 2, opened in November 1923 with 763 seats as a modernisation of the 1910 Shepherd's Bush Cinematograph Theatre. It was modernised again in 1968 and the seating was reduced to 500; reopening was delayed by a fire. It was taken over by Odeon Cinemas in 1973. The cinema closed in December 1981 and after standing empty for some time, was converted into a pub; it was one of the Australian-themed Walkabout chain until October 2013, when the building was sold.

Picture Playhouse, Gerrards Cross (1925): The Picture Playhouse, now the Everyman Gerrards Cross, was opened in October 1925. It was smaller than many of their London sites, with a capacity of 570 seats when it first opened. It was taken over by Southan Morris in 1947, then the Essoldo chain who drastically altered the exterior of the building in 1969. In 1979, under the ownership of Classic Cinemas, the building was twinned with a smaller 213-seat auditorium built in the roof. The site was later owned by ABC, ODEON and finally sold to Everyman in 2015.

Walpole, Ealing (1925): The Walpole, Ealing, was converted to a cinema with over 1,400 seats from a roller skating rink; it had originally been built in 1912 as a 1,200 seat cinema or theatre and converted to a roller rink around 1919. It reopened in November 1925. Beard added an ornate façade of ceramic tiles. It closed in 1972 and became a carpet showroom and then a music studio, then was demolished, but the façade was saved and is on display nearby.

Capitol Cinema, Walton-on-Thames (1927): The Capitol Cinema, later the Odeon, Walton-on-Thames, opened in December 1927 with 1,015 seats and a stage for variety performances. It was Art Deco in style. It was taken over by Odeon in 1937, renamed in 1946, and closed in 1980. After standing empty for 10 years, it was demolished in 1990 and replaced in 1992 with a new development which includes a duplex cinema, the Screen Walton-on-Thames.

Capitol, Forest Hill (1928–29): The Capitol, later ABC Cinema, Forest Hill, opened in November 1929 with 1691 seats. It was designed in Egyptian style. There was a full-sized stage, three dressing rooms, and a Compton organ; there were variety shows and organ concerts there in the 1950s. It was taken over by Odeon but never operated by them; it closed as a cinema in 1973, became a bingo hall, and became a pub in 2001. It became a Grade II listed building in 1993. It was designed before talking pictures so had to be retrofitted for sound. It is one of the few 1920s cinema buildings still extant.

Royalty Cinema, North Kensington (1929): The Royalty Cinema, North Kensington, near Ladbroke Grove Underground station, opened in February 1929 with 1,288 seats, was taken over by ABC in 1935 and closed in 1960. The building reopened as a bingo club in 1965 but has since been demolished. It was neo-classical in style, with an arched entrance to the right of which the auditorium extended parallel to the street.

Luxor, Twickenham (1929): The Luxor, later the Odeon, Twickenham, the best of his cinemas in Egyptian style, had a façade combining Art Deco and Egyptian styles and an Egyptian interior with blue sky, clouds, and the sun depicted on the ceiling, a bird in flight over the proscenium arch and carpeting in a special Egyptian design. It opened in 1929 with 1,709 seats, usherettes dressed as Cleopatra, a symphony orchestra and a new-model Compton organ with a full range of percussion. It also had a large, well-equipped stage and four dressing rooms. The lobby was in modern style and had two box offices with automatic indicators showing what seats were available, and there was a central air purification, heating and cooling system. The cinema closed in 1981 after a final organ concert; part of the organ was incorporated into the Compton organ at the Odeon Leicester Square, and the building was demolished in 1986.

Golden Domes, Streatham (1929): The Golden Domes, Streatham, was an enlargement of the 1912 Streatham Picture Theatre from 900 to 1,012 seats, reopening in October 1929. The cinema was renamed for the two towers, topped by golden domes, flanking the entrance. ABC took it over in 1935 and closed it in November 1938 after building a larger cinema down the road. The façade was removed and the building became a supermarket and then a hardware store.

Forum Theatre, Fulham (1930): The Forum Theatre, later ABC Cinema, now Cineworld, Fulham, opened in December 1930 with a seating capacity of 2,200, a 24-piece orchestra, a full stage with eight dressing rooms, and a 3-manual Compton organ. The style was Italian Renaissance or classical with touches of Romanesque, and the auditorium had an 80-foot coffered dome in the ceiling and pastoral scenes on the walls. The café above the foyer was circular. Pevsner refers to "a prominent bowed foyer articulated by giant-order Corinthian columns and Olympiad bronze torches". This was the first of three Forums designed by Beard for Herbert A. Yapp's Wyanbee Theatres, a small circuit taken over by ABC in 1935, the others being Ealing and Kentish Town. In 1974 it was tripled and in 1975 a squash court that had been created in the carpark became a fourth auditorium. The circle auditorium was subdivided in 1977 and a sixth screen later added above the annexe where the squash court had been. It became a Grade II listed building in September 2024.

New Palace Cinema, Kensal Rise (1931): The New Palace Cinema, later the Palace Cinema and the ABC, Kensal Rise, was an expansion of the 1913 Acme Picture Theatre, later the Kings Picture Palace, which became the foyer (and the old projection room became the manager's office). Beard's cinema was Art Deco in style and seated 1,600. It closed in January 1974, was briefly a bingo hall and then a nightclub, which closed in 1983, and was later demolished.

Queens Cinema, Bayswater (1932): The Queens Cinema, later ABC, then Cannon, Bayswater, was designed in Art Deco style with 1,428 seats and a full stage. Much of the façade was covered up in 1962 and it was tripled in 1975. It closed in 1988 and was unused until becoming a T.G.I. Friday's restaurant from 1995 to 2007; in the conversion the façade covering was removed but the interior was changed.

Morden Cinema, Morden (1932): The Morden Cinema, later the Odeon, Morden, originally intended to be the first of the small chain of Forum cinemas, opened as an independent in December 1932, opposite Morden Underground station, the terminus of the Northern line. It was an Art Deco building with 1,638 seats, a small stage and two dressing rooms, and a 3-manual Compton organ on a lift—the first Compton to have an illuminated console. It was sold to Odeon Cinemas in 1935 and closed in January 1973. The building was converted into a B&Q DIY store and was demolished in 1990.

Plaza, West Wickham (1933): The Plaza, later the Odeon and finally the Gaumont, West Wickham, was Beard's one-hundredth cinema. It had 886 seats and a full stage with three dressing rooms. The style was Art Deco, with a façade of white tile on either side of a brick section with three tall windows surmounted by a polychrome frieze. The cinema opened in April 1933, closed in 1957 and was demolished in 1961.

Forum, Ealing (1934): The Forum, later ABC, MGM, UGC, Cannon, Cineworld, and finally Empire Cinema, in Ealing, was designed in Italian Renaissance style with a Classical interior. Beard worked with both Clare and Bennett on this cinema. It opened in April 1934 with 2,175 seats and had a 3-manual, 9-rank Compton organ and a stage with a full fly tower. It was tripled in 1975, closed in 2008, and all but the façade was demolished late that year, even though the building was listed locally; there are plans to build a new multiplex behind the façade, also incorporating the façade from Beard's Walpole cinema.

Forum, Kentish Town (1934): The Forum, later ABC, Kentish Town, is almost identical to the Forum, Ealing, with the same seating capacity. It opened later the same year and is now a Grade II listed building, used as a music performance space and once more called the Forum. Doors salvaged from the Forum, Ealing are to be used to replace those it has lost.

Astoria Cinema, Ruislip (1934): The Astoria Cinema, later the Embassy Cinema, Ruislip, opened in September 1934 with 800 seats. It was in Art Deco style; the splay walls on either side of the screen featured grilles with a design of fishes. In 1967 it was modernised, with metal cladding placed on the façade, and renamed. It closed in 1981 as an EMI cinema and was demolished in 1986.

Prince of Wales' Cinema, Paddington (1934): The Prince of Wales' Cinema, Paddington, was a cinema equipped for variety performances and seating 1,570, which opened in October 1934 on the site of the 1912–15 Prince of Wales' Picture Playhouse, which had seated 650. Beard designed it with Bennett in Art Deco style; the façade was of cream faience tiles and had three large windows in the centre. It was sold to ABC in 1935 and closed in 1968. It was a bingo club from 1970 to 1996 and has since been demolished.

State Cinema, Dartford (1935): The State Cinema, later Granada, Dartford, was opened in December 1935. Beard designed it in Art Deco and Neo-classical style with Bennett. The façade was brick with a central section of terracotta tiles surrounding a large window. The auditorium seated 1,500 and had a 3-manual Compton organ with illuminated console. Granada Ltd. took it over in April 1949 and renamed it in October. A stream ran under the cinema and a serious flood in 1968 damaged the organ, which had been in regular use; it was repaired but in 1979 was sold to Gunton Hall Country Club in Suffolk. The cinema closed in 1975 and became a bingo club, which has since been sold by Granada to another operator.

Classic Cinema, Baker Street (1937): The Classic Cinema, Baker Street, opened in October 1937 as the only purpose-built cinema in the Classic Repertory Cinemas chain. It was intended as a luxury cinema for showing classic films, and the building also housed the head offices of the chain. It was streamlined Art Deco and seated 489. It closed in 1973 and was replaced by a mixed-use development with two basement cinemas, which opened in 1978 as the Sherlock Holmes Centa 1 & 2, later became the Screen on Baker Street and are now the Everyman Baker Street.

Other buildings included:

- Gunnersbury Court, South Acton (1936) – flats

=== as J. Stanley Beard & Bennett ===
- 1946–47: National Cash Registers factory, Dundee

=== as Beard Bennett Wilkins & Partners ===
- 1947: Timex factory, Dundee
- 1953: Station hotel, Perth (reconstruction)
- 1955: Offices, Wall's meat and bacon plant, Acton
- 1958: Station hotel, Inverness (reconstruction)
- 1959: Wall's icecream factory and coldstore, Edinburgh
- 1960: Nuffield Trust nursing home, Edinburgh
