= Frank Verity =

English cinema architect

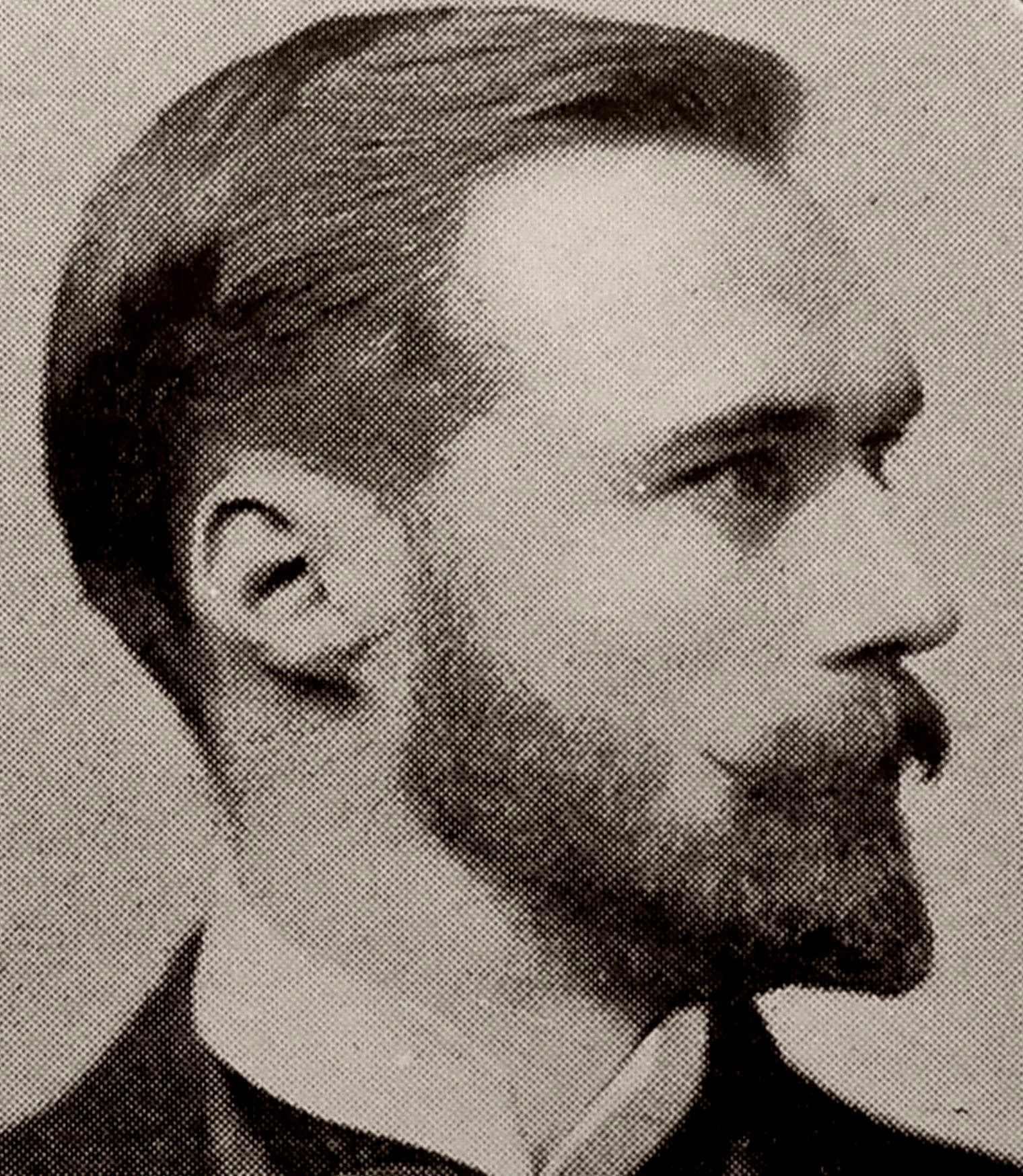
Verity in 1905

Francis Thomas Verity (1864–1937) was an English cinema architect during the cinema building boom of the years following World War I.

== Early life ==
Verity was born in London, educated at Cranleigh and joined Thomas Verity, his father, in his architectural practice, which specialised in theatre building.

== Career ==
Both Veritys brought an interest in ornate Second Empire-style architecture to their early buildings, developing this into grand Beaux Arts in their later works. Many of the surviving buildings have achieved recognition in the late 20th century, becoming listed for their architectural significance.

Frank Verity continued the practice on his father's death in 1891, and Sam Beverley, his son-in-law, joined the practice in the 1920s, which remains active today. The company designed over 25 cinemas, achieving a Royal Institute of British Architects bronze medal for the Shepherd's Bush Pavilion cinema in 1930.

Works include no 5 Lisle Street in London's Chinatown, with stepped gables and terracotta cladding. The building was the London office of Pathe films, then later a hospital and now a restaurant.

In 1915 he was the architect of a block of flats on the site of the former Somerset House in Park Lane, the first such building in that important street.

Verity designed many central London premises, including: the Carlton Theatre (1927), now a cinema; the Embassy Theatre (1923) and restaurant in High Holborn, now demolished and the site occupied by offices; and the Plaza Theatre (1926) as a cinema for Paramount - remains in use.
