= Westminster Theatre =

Former theatre and cinema in London, England

- Interactive map of Westminster Theatre
- Coordinates: 51.49857°N 0.14091°W
- Capacity: 560 (main house); 100 (studio theatre)

Construction
- Built: 1766
- Opened: 1931
- Renovated: 1924, 1931, 1966, 1972
- Demolished: 2002

The Westminster Theatre was a theatre in London, on Palace Street in Westminster.

== History ==
The structure on the site was originally built as the Charlotte Chapel in 1766, by William Dodd with money from his wife Mary Perkins. Through Peter Richard Hoare it came into the hands of the family owning Hoare's Bank, and was called St Peter's Chapel.

It was altered and given a new frontage, by John Stanley Coombe Beard for use as a cinema, St James's Picture Theatre, opened in 1924. The conversion was by a group with court connections including Henry Lascelles, 6th Earl of Harewood. The film shown at the opening was Rob Roy.

The Picture Theatre then became a venue for live drama in 1931 after radical alterations, at the hands of Alderson Burrell Horne (1863–1953). Horne was known in the theatrical world as Anmer Hall, and also used the stage name Waldo Wright. In the mid 1930s Kathleen Mary Robinson came from Australia to study theatre production and she helped the producer Osmund Daltry. She also directed and the actors included Michael Wilding and the later playwright Emlyn Williams.

The theatre was bought by the Westminster Memorial Trust in April 1946 as a memorial to men in Moral Re-Armament (MRA) who gave their lives in World War II. The Trust held it for more than 30 years. Besides putting on productions for the MRA, it was let out to other companies. It was the base for Furndel Productions, run by actor Alan Badel and producer William Anthony Furness, for example with The Ark in 1959. Influential on the MRA productions was Peter Howard, as playwright and also in changing the running of the theatre, where he replaced amateurs of the early period in the 1940s by professional technicians, and brought in the director Henry Cass.

In 1966 the theatre was remodelled, with the addition of an arts centre, after MRA fundraising in 1965. Further work was carried out in 1972, with the addition of two floors. The premises were decorated with a work of art by professor Lennart Segerstråle called "Barbed wire or reconciliation".

MRA withdrew from drama at the Westminster Theatre in 1990, for reasons of cost. Plans were drawn up to extensively remodel the theatre in the early 2000s. A campaign by the owner to save the theatre ended when a fire destroyed 75% of the building on 27 June 2002, with demolition coming soon afterwards. In May 2009, plans for a new 314-seat theatre and a smaller cabaret stage, flats and a restaurant, all situated on the site of the original building, were given approval by Westminster City Council. The new St James Theatre (now The Other Palace) opened in September 2012.

== Notable productions ==
- Harley Granville Barker's Waste, 1936. Directed by the author; this was the first full public production.
- Toussaint Louverture: The Story of the Only Successful Slave Revolt in History by C. L. R. James, 1936, directed by Peter Godfrey, starring Paul Robeson, Orlando Martins and Harry Andrews.
- Oscar Wilde's An Ideal Husband, 1943, with Martita Hunt as Mrs Cheveley.
- Eden and Adelaide Phillpotts's comedy Yellow Sands, from 29 March 1945, with Cedric Hardwicke as Richard Varwell
- Henry V, July 1953, Elizabethan Theatre Company, notable as the first London play directed by John Barton
- The Duenna with music by Julian Slade; lyrics and book by Dorothy Reynolds; London production, opened 28 July 1954 and ran for 134 performances.
- Freedom, 1955, with an African cast, set in the imaginary country Bokondo, filmed in 1956 in Nigeria.
- The Hurricane, 1961, with Muriel Smith and Phyllis Konstam. Filmed as The Voice of the Hurricane.
- British Touring Shakespeare Company, Hamlet, 2002
