= Shepherd's Bush Green =

Common land in Shepherd's Bush, London

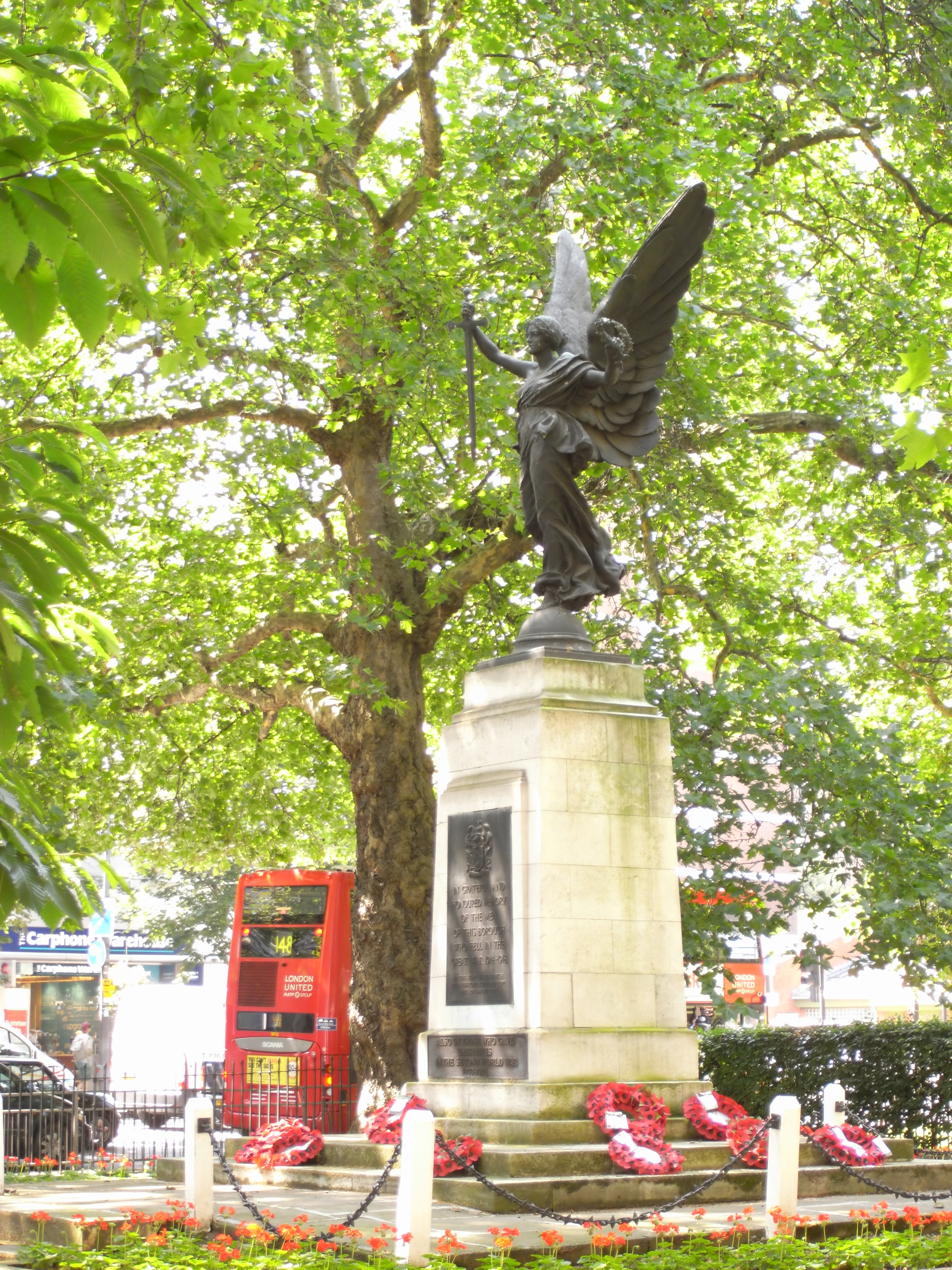
- Shepherd's Bush Green war memorial
- Interactive map of Shepherd's Bush Green
- Type: Public Park
- Location: Shepherd's Bush, London, England
- Coordinates: 51.50413°N 0.22284°W

Shepherd's Bush Green (also known as Shepherd's Bush Common) is an approximately 8-acre (3.2 ha) triangular area of open grass surrounded by trees and roads with shops in Shepherd's Bush, an area of west London which takes its name from the Green. The Green is also a ward of the London Borough of Hammersmith and Fulham. The population of the ward at the 2011 Census was 12,175.

== History ==
The origins of the name Shepherd's Bush are obscure. The name may have originated from the use of the common land as a resting point for shepherds on their way to Smithfield Market in the City of London. There appears to have been an ancient custom of pruning a hawthorne bush to provide a shelter for shepherds protecting them from the elements as they watched their flocks. Alternatively the Green may simply be named after a local landowner. In any event, in 1635 it was recorded as "Sheppards Bush Green".

At the turn of the 20th century Hammersmith MP Sir William Bull was appalled to see Shepherd's Bush Green become home to destitute unemployed sleeping rough, gambling, and playing pitch and toss.

== Today ==
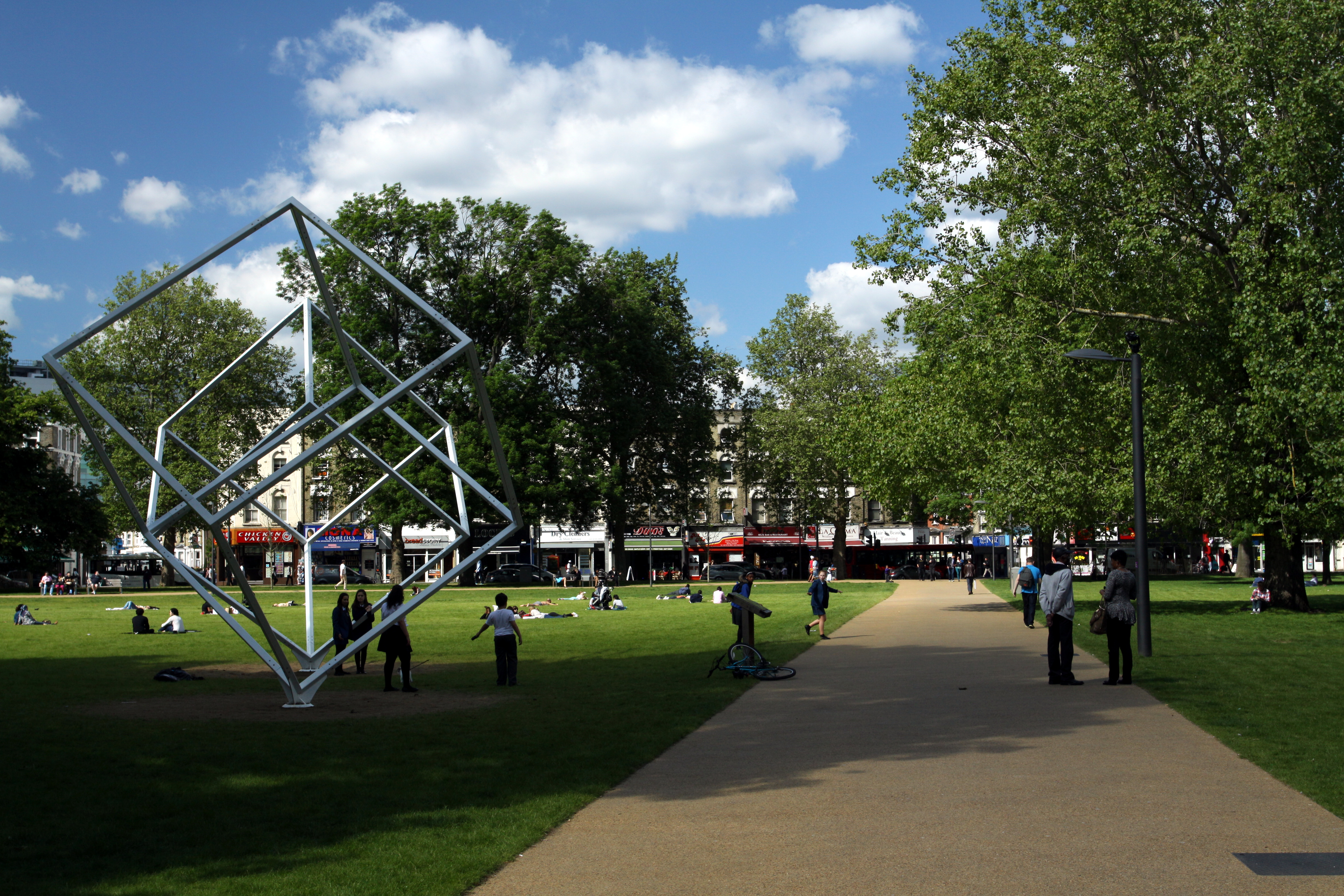
Shepherd's Bush Green in spring 2013

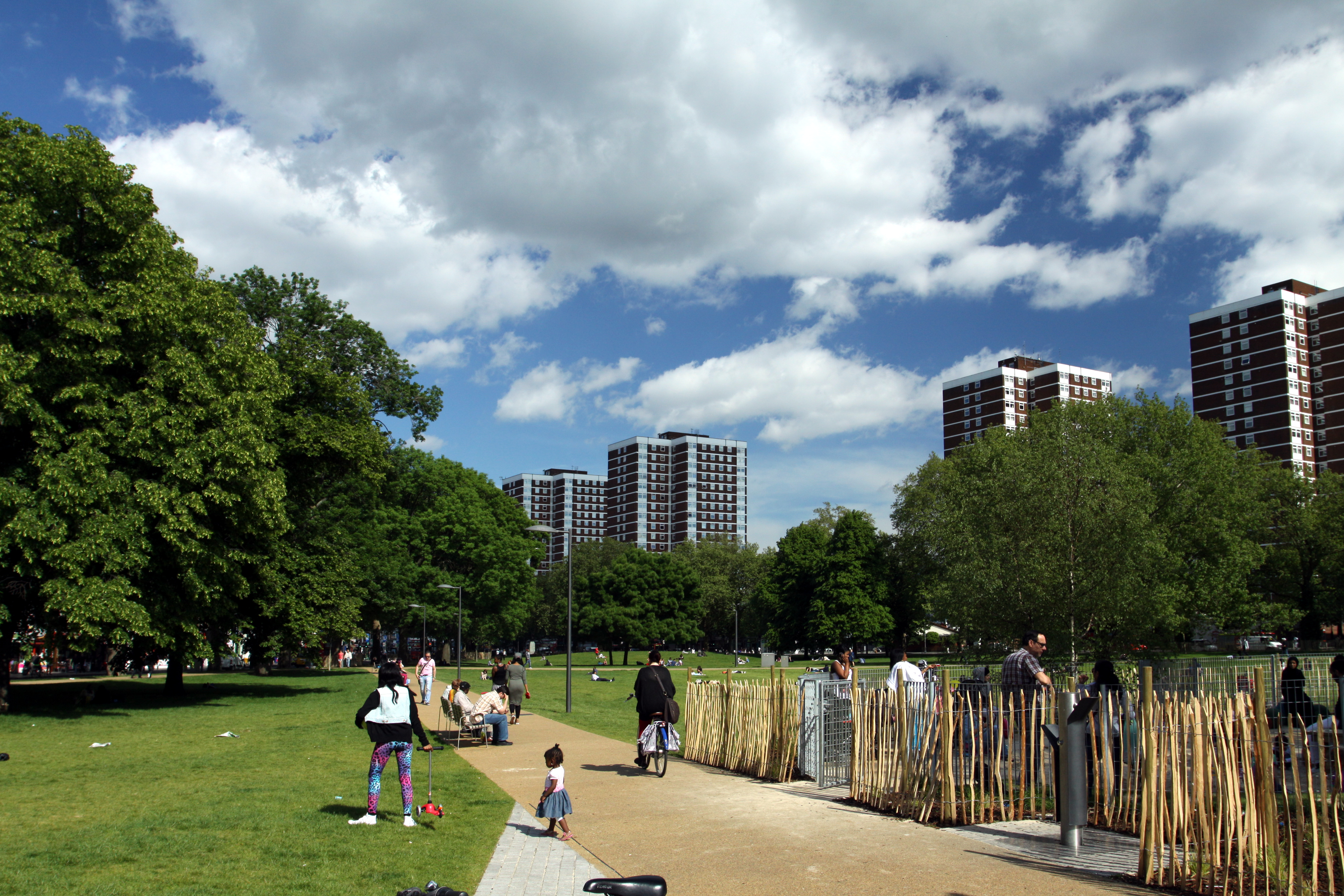
Shepherd's Bush Green in spring 2013

Today the Green is surrounded by busy roads on all three sides. Four main roads radiate from the western side of the Green and three roads approaching its eastern apex, meeting at the large Holland Park Roundabout. This position makes it an important node of the bus network, with eighteen bus routes arriving there. It is also near five London Underground stations; Shepherd's Bush (Central line), White City (Central line), Shepherd's Bush Market (Hammersmith & City line), Goldhawk Road (Hammersmith & City line) and Wood Lane (Hammersmith & City line).

On the north side of the Green is the Uxbridge Road, and beyond that the Westfield London shopping centre. To the east, the Green is bounded by the physical barrier of the West London Line and the grade-separated West Cross Route (part of the aborted 1960s London Motorway Box scheme). The Holland Park Roundabout and the small Addison Bridge to the south are the only ways to cross this barrier.

To the east of the Green lies affluent and leafy Holland Park and Notting Hill; although the Edward Woods Estate just to the northeast of the roundabout is part of and managed by the London Borough of Hammersmith and Fulham, and is therefore more closely associated with Shepherd's Bush.

== Redevelopment ==
The London Borough of Hammersmith and Fulham substantially re-developed Shepherd's Bush Green in 2013. The plans included creating two new play areas for children, the planting of further trees and a general improvement to routes across the Green for both cyclists and pedestrians. A proposal to create a new cafe was declined by the planning authorities.

The redevelopment of the Green was scheduled to be completed in time for the 2012 Summer Olympics but, apparently due to high levels of arsenic found in the soil by building contractors, the plans were substantially delayed.

An Inspire Mark (awarded by the London Organising Committee of the Olympic and Paralympic Games (LOCOG), making it part of the Cultural Olympiad) was given to public artworks created by artist Elliott Brook, entitled "Goaloids", which were installed on Shepherd's Bush Green for the duration of London 2012 and the Paralympic Games. These large unique rotating football-related sculptures commemorated the history of Shepherd's Bush and White City, which hosted the 1908 Summer Olympics football. The London Borough of Hammersmith and Fulham is the only borough to have two football teams playing Premier League football.

== Politics ==
Shepherd's Bush Green is part of the Shepherd's Bush Green ward for elections to Hammersmith and Fulham London Borough Council.

== See also ==
- History of Shepherd's Bush
- Shepherd's Bush
