= History of Shepherd's Bush =

History of London neighbourhood

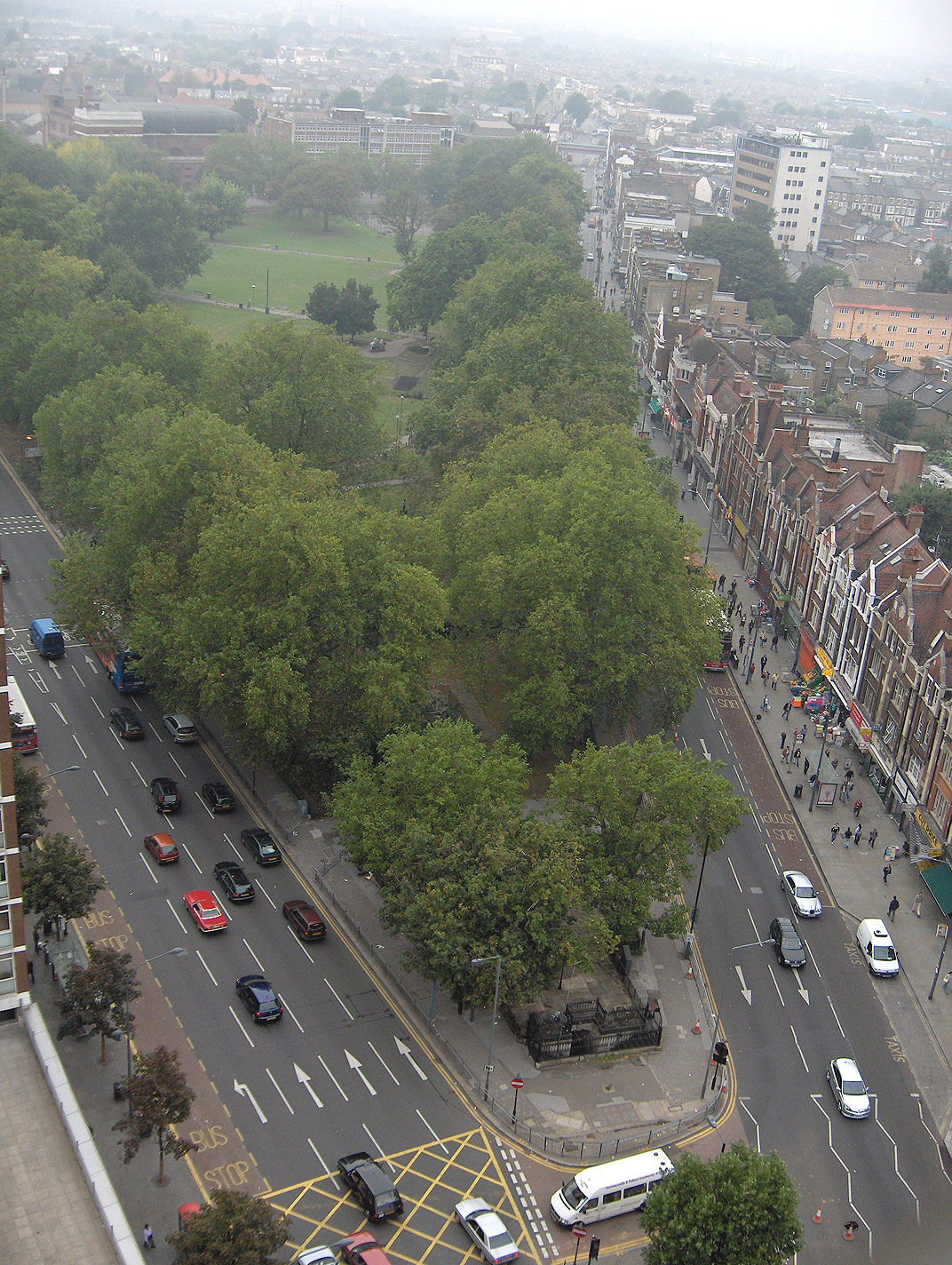
Shepherd's Bush Green in 2006.

Shepherd's Bush is a neighbourhood in the London Borough of Hammersmith and Fulham centred on Shepherd's Bush Green. Originally a pasture for shepherds on their way to Smithfield market, it was largely developed in the late nineteenth and early twentieth centuries. In 1844 the West London Railway officially opened, followed in 1864 by the Metropolitan Railway who built the original Shepherd's Bush station, opening up the area to residential development. Businesses soon followed, and in 1903 the west side of Shepherd's Bush Green became the home of the Shepherd's Bush Empire, a music hall whose early performers included Charlie Chaplin.

In 1908 Shepherd's Bush became one of the principal sites for the Summer Olympics and, in the same year, hosted the Franco-British Exhibition (also known as "The Bush Exhibition", and "The Great White City"), a large public fair, which attracted 8 million visitors and celebrated the Entente Cordiale signed in 1904 by the United Kingdom and France. Other exhibitions followed until interrupted in 1914 by World War I. In 1915 Gaumont constructed Lime Grove Studios, "the first building ever put up in this country solely for the production of films", later occupied by the BBC until their move to nearby White City.

During World War II the area suffered from enemy bombing, especially from V-weapons which struck randomly and with little warning. Post war developments included the construction of the Westway and the M41 spur (now the West Cross Route) to the M40 motorway which cut Shepherd's Bush off from Holland Park, and in the process demolished much Victorian housing.

In 2008 the Westfield London shopping centre opened its doors on the former White City exhibition site. With a retail floor area of 150,000m², it was reported to be the largest shopping centre in London, and the third-largest in Britain.

== Origins ==
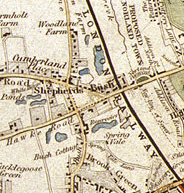
Shepherd's Bush, from an 1841 London map by Davies.

The origins of the name Shepherds Bush are obscure. The name may have originated from the use of the common land here as a resting point for shepherds on their way to Smithfield Market in the City of London. There appears to have been an ancient custom of pruning a hawthorn bush to provide a shelter for shepherds protecting them from the elements as they watched their flocks. Alternatively the neighbourhood may simply be named after a local landowner. In 1635 the area was recorded as "Sheppards Bush Green".

Evidence of human habitation can be traced back to the Iron Age. Shepherd's Bush enters the written record in the year 704 when it was bought by Waldhere, Bishop of London as a part of the "Fulanham" estate. However, the neighbourhood appears to have been of little note until the mid-seventeenth century, when a cottage on the Goldhawk road became the home of one Miles Sindercombe, a disgruntled Roundhead who in 1657 made several attempts to assassinate Oliver Cromwell. Sindercombe planned to ambush the Lord Protector using a specially built machine with muskets fixed to a frame. His plan failed, and Sindercombe was sentenced to be hung drawn and quartered, although he managed to avoid his fate, as his sister succeeded in smuggling poison into his cell. His cottage, adjacent to the Green, was eventually demolished in the 1760s.

John Rocque's eighteenth century map shows Shepherd's Bush to be almost entirely rural, with a few scattered buildings around the Green, such as Shepherd's Bush House. The basic road layout is however broadly similar to that of today, with the "North High Way" (today the Uxbridge Road) to the west of the Green, and Turvens Lane (now Wood Lane) running to the north.

At the Eastern end of the Green stood two gibbets, where, up until 1751, several criminals were hung in chains after their execution. These are shown in a map of the area by John Rocques. The last of the two gibbets was blown down in a storm and not replaced. (There was a further gibbet not far away; at what is now the junction of Uxbridge Road and Becklow Road: more or less where the Queen Victoria pub now stands.)

== Nineteenth century ==
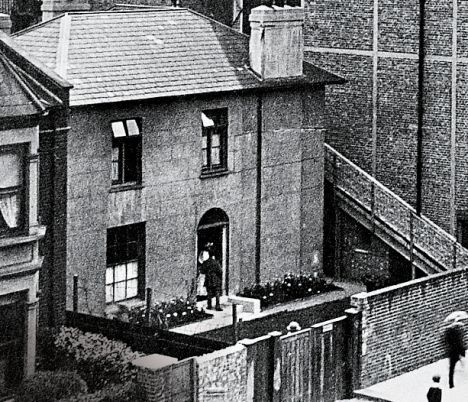
Urania Cottage

A map of London dated 1841 shows Shepherd's Bush to be still largely undeveloped and chiefly rural in character, with much open farmland compared to fast-developing Hammersmith, and several ponds or small lakes. Scattered buildings are shown, mostly lining the main thoroughfares of Wood Lane, Cumberland Road (now the Uxbridge Road), and Goldhawk Road. In 1839 Shepherd's Bush was described by Faulkner as "a pleasant village".

In 1846 the philanthropist Baroness Angela Burdett-Coutts acquired a house in what is now Lime Grove, which she intended to convert into a home for destitute prostitutes. Her partner in this plan, who carried out much of the work, was the author Charles Dickens. The result was Urania Cottage, a home for "fallen women" designed to be strict but liberal in its approach to social reform. Burdett-Coutts was a personal friend of the Duke of Wellington, a generous benefactor and extremely devout – so much so that she dismissed Dickens' appointment as deputy matron on the grounds that she was a dissenter. Gradually the differences between the pair increased and in 1862 Dickens separated from his wife, causing a public scandal which eventually led to the demise of the Urania experiment.

In 1864, William Plimley was raising pineapples in Shepherd's Bush, in his "forcing pinery", but the Western expansion of the railways would soon see the fields of Shepherd's Bush replaced with houses.

In c. 1870 – c. 1872, John Marius Wilson's Imperial Gazetteer of England and Wales described Shepherds Bush as follows:

"SHEPHERDS-BUSH, a metropolitan suburb in Kensington parish, Middlesex; on the Metropolitan railway, 5½ miles W by S of St. Paul's, London. It has a station with telegraph on the railway, and a post-office under London W; contains many villas and other fine residences, with gardens; contains also Kensington – St. Stephens church, built in 1850, in the pointed style, with a tower and spire; and has, of late years, greatly increased."

=== Trams and railways ===
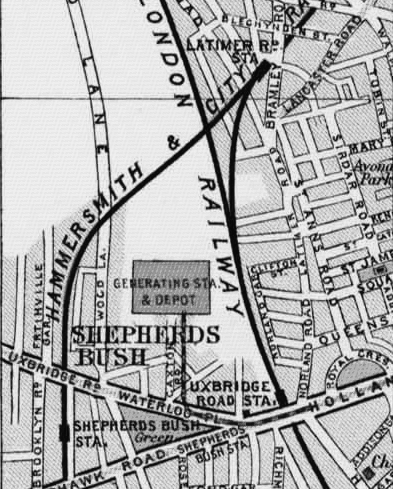
1900 map showing stations

In the 1870s private companies began to set up tram services in Shepherd's Bush. In 1874 a track was laid along the Uxbridge Road to Askew Crescent; the venture failed but re-opened 4 years later, extending to Hammersmith in 1882. Trams were smoother and more comfortable than the Omnibus, although the routes were less flexible. In 1901 electricity began to replace horse-drawn trams in Shepherd's Bush, but overall there were many different private companies which competed for the public's business until 1933 when almost of London's private transport companies were amalgamated under the London Passenger Transport Board

The West London Railway is shown on an 1841 map, travelling on a north–south axis, east of Shepherd's Bush Green. In 1836 The Birmingham, Bristol & Thames Junction Railway (as it was then known) was authorised to build a line from a point on the London and Birmingham Railway (L&BR), near the present Willesden Junction station, across the proposed route of the Great Western (GWR) to the Kensington Canal Basin. Renamed the West London Railway (WLR), the line officially opened on 27 May 1844, and regular services began on 10 June, but it was not a commercial success – the low number of passengers became such a regular target of Punch magazine that the line was called Punch's Railway. After only six months it closed entirely on 30 November 1844.

The Metropolitan Railway (MR) opened the original Shepherd's Bush station on 13 June 1864 as Shepherd's Bush on its new extension to Hammersmith. It was in the Shepherd's Bush Market area just south of the Uxbridge Road. From 1 October 1877 until 31 December 1906, the MR also ran direct services along this line to Richmond via Hammersmith (Grove Road).

On 1 November 1869, the West London Railway opened its Uxbridge Road station on the site of the current Shepherd's Bush main line station. During its lifetime, the station was served by the Great Western Railway, the MR and various other main line companies.

On 1 May 1874, the London & South Western Railway opened its Shepherd's Bush station on a line linking the West London line and the Hammersmith and City Railway. It operated until 3 January 1916.

=== Urbanisation ===
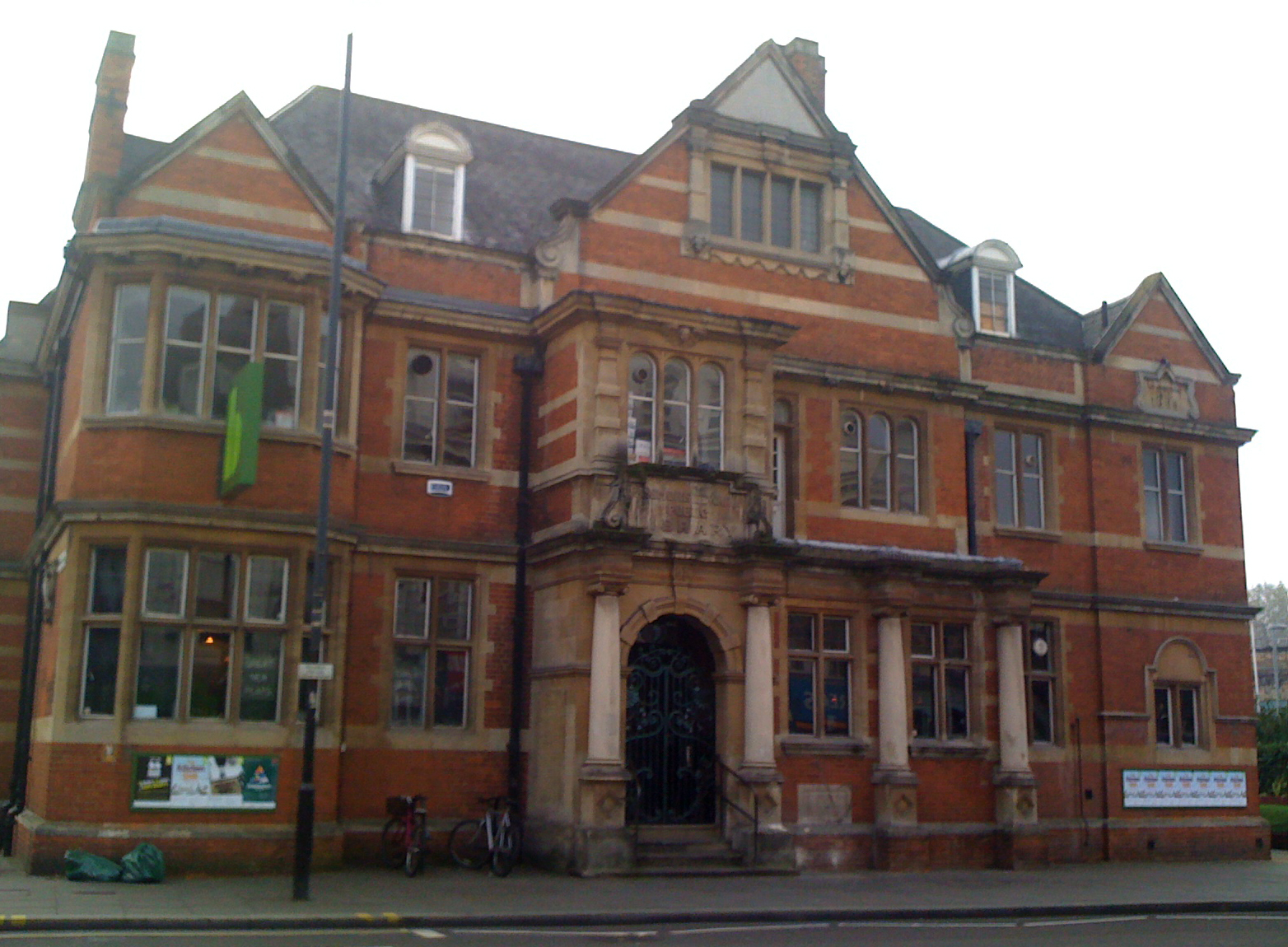
The Passmore Edwards Public Library, built in 1895

Residential development of the area began in earnest in the late 19th century, as London's population expanded relentlessly, requiring new housing. The Anglican church led the way with the building of St Stephen's, an Anglican church on the Uxbridge road somewhat west of the Green. It was built c. 1849 – c. 1850, designed by architect Anthony Salvin, and built in the Gothic Revival style with a tower.

In 1895 the Passmore Edwards Public Library was built on the Uxbridge Road, funded by the journalist and philanthropist Passmore Edwards, whose name the building bears to this day, though it is now a theatre.

In 1898 the Shepherd's Bush Village Hall was opened on Wood Lane, and the DIMCO buildings were constructed, a red brick structure (Now Grade II listed) originally built as a shed for a London Underground power station, Europe's first electricity generating facility.

Towards the end of the century a number of residential streets were developed, aimed at the urban middle classes. One example is Hopgood Street, a typical Victorian terrace of four storey brick buildings, faced with neo-classical stucco enrichments, completed c1899.

== Twentieth century ==
Building continued rapidly in the early twentieth century, and palaces of entertainment soon followed. In 1903 the Shepherd's Bush Empire was built for impresario Oswald Stoll, designed by theatre architect Frank Matcham. The first performers included Charlie Chaplin in 1906. The Empire staged music-hall entertainments, such as variety performances and revues, until the early 1950s, by which time the popularity of these forms of entertainment was declining. The Empire would be followed in 1910 by its neighbour the Palladium, originally known as the Cinematograph Theatre, which changed hands a number of times but eventually closed in 1981. The building later operated as a pub owned by the Australian-themed Walkabout chain until closing in 2013, after which the site was redeveloped while retaining its historic façade.

In 1904 The Catholic Church of Holy Ghost and St Stephen, built in the Gothic style with a triple-gabled facade of red brick and Portland stone, was completed and opened to the public. The church catered to the spiritual needs of many of Shepherd's Bush's new inhabitants – Irish labourers seeking work and opportunities in London, whose arrival in the capital created fears of urban slums and the spread of disease. It was clear that urbanisation would not necessarily bring prosperity to the area. At the turn of the century Hammersmith MP Sir William Bull was appalled to see Shepherd's Bush Green become home to destitute unemployed sleeping rough, gambling, and playing pitch and toss.

In 1907 the Baptist Shepherd's Bush Tabernacle was completed, designed by architect P W Hawkins.

=== The Underground comes to Shepherd's Bush ===
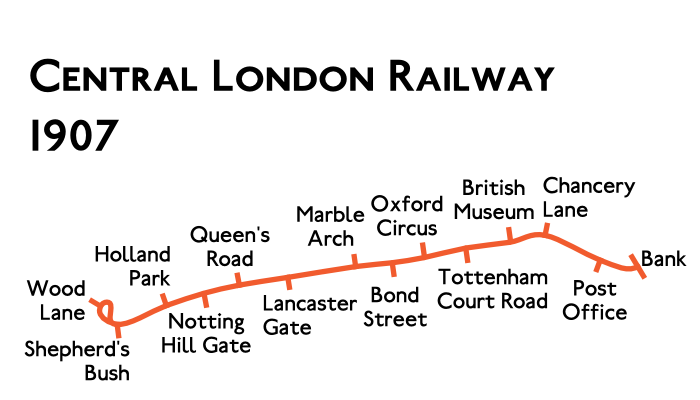
Central London Railway route approved in 1907

In 1900 the Central London Railway (CLR) opened its Shepherd's Bush station, now the Central line station, at the east end of Shepherd's Bush Green. The line was formally inaugurated by the Prince of Wales, later King Edward VII, on 27 June. The Central London Railway (CLR), also known as the Twopenny Tube, was a deep-level, underground "tube" railway that opened in London in 1900. Today, the CLR's tunnels and stations form the central section of the London Underground's Central line.

The railway company was established in 1889, funding for construction was obtained in 1895 through a syndicate of financiers and work took place from 1896 to 1900. When opened, the CLR served 13 stations and ran completely underground in a pair of tunnels for 9.14 kilometres (5.68 mi) between its western terminus at Shepherd's Bush and its eastern terminus at the Bank of England, with a depot and power station to the north of the western terminus.

For 108 years, until 2008, there were (rather confusingly) two Tube stations of the same name 0.3 miles (480 m) apart. In 1914, the original Shepherd's Bush station (built in 1864) closed, replaced by two new stations which opened on 1 April 1914. The new Shepherd's Bush station was re-sited a short distance north across the Uxbridge Road, with Goldhawk Road about half a kilometre to the south. The two stations remain in the same locations today.

=== 1908 Summer Olympics ===
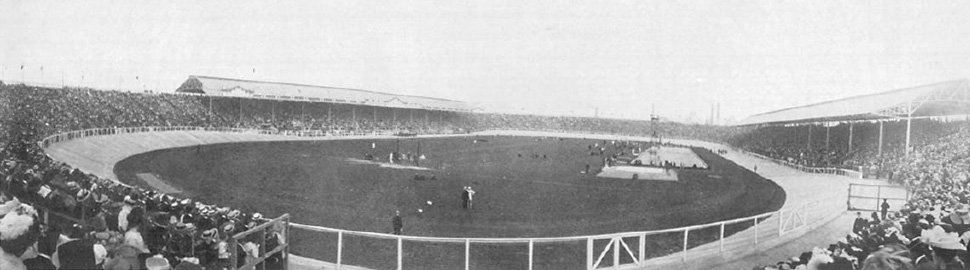
White City Stadium in 1908

The Summer Olympics of 1908 was held in Britain, and large-scale sporting venues were therefore required to be built. Just to the north of Shepherd's Bush, the Great Stadium (later known as The White City Stadium) was constructed for the 1908 Olympics. Opened by King Edward VII on April 27, 1908, this immense technological marvel was the first Olympic Stadium built in the United Kingdom. Great Britain led the participating nations with 146 medals, including 56 Gold.

Following the Olympics, the stadium continued to be used for athletics until 1914, and was later turned into a greyhound racing track, although it was also used for short periods by Queens Park Rangers football club, and for other sports. It hosted one match during the 1966 World Cup. The stadium continued to serve as a sporting venue until 1985 when it was demolished and replaced by the BBC White City Centre.

=== Franco-British Exhibition – the Great White City ===
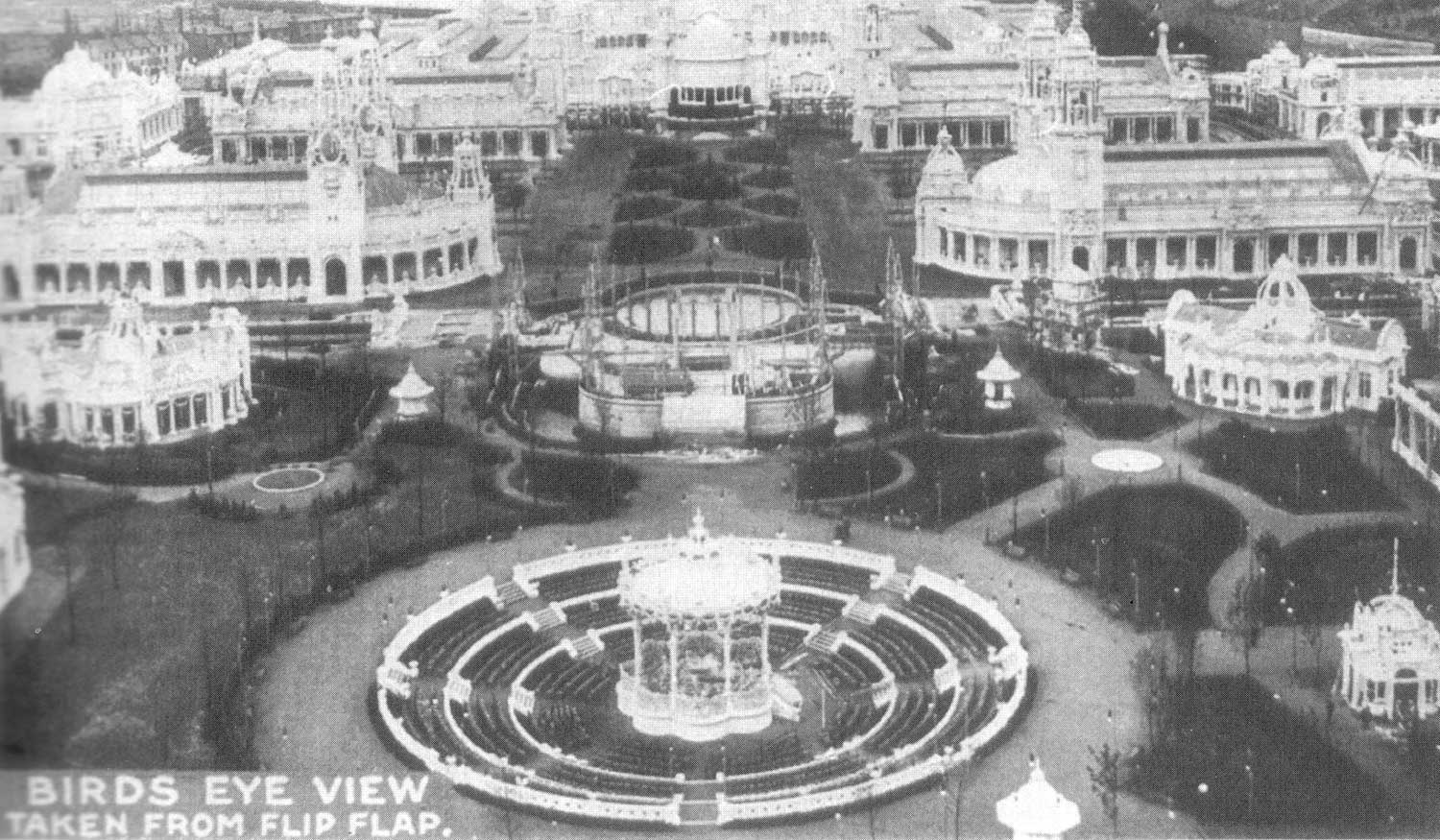
Aerial view from the "Flip Flap" of the Great White City of 1908

1908 would also witness The Franco-British Exhibition (also known as "The Bush Exhibition", and as Elite Gardens), a large public fair, which attracted 8 million visitors and celebrated the Entente Cordiale signed in 1904 by the United Kingdom and France. The exhibition buildings were clad in gleaming white marble, and the attraction was soon dubbed the "Great White City". The nickname stuck, and White City is today the formal name for the area just to the north of Shepherd's Bush.

The 1908 Summer Olympics fencing events were held in the district alongside the festivities.

The fair was the largest exhibition of its kind in Britain, and the first international exhibition co-organised and sponsored by two countries. It covered an area of some 140 acres (0.57 km^{2}), including an artificial lake, surrounded by an immense network of white buildings in elaborate (often Oriental) styles. One of the main attractions was the Flip Flap, a crane operated cable car with views of the city.

The most popular attractions at the exhibition were the two so-called "colonial villages" – an "Irish village" and a "Senegalese village", which were designed to communicate the success of imperialism. The Irish village ("Ballymaclinton") was inhabited by 150 "colleens" (Irish girls) who demonstrated various forms of domestic industry, as well as displays of manufacturing and even an art gallery. The "Senegalese village" was a so-called "native village" displaying day-to-day life, as well as various artefacts. Press reports commented on the "surprising cleanliness" of the Irish, while readers were reminded that the Senegalese were "cleaner than they looked".

Little sign of the fair remains today. The exhibition site is now occupied by the BBC Television Centre, opened in 1960, and the Westfield Shopping Centre, which opened in late 2008. The last remaining buildings of the 1908 exhibition were demolished to make way for the Westfield development. Frithville Gardens, once part of the Japanese Garden, is the only part of the 1908 exhibition site still visible. A small area of tiling preserved from the Garden can still be seen inside the main Television Centre site adjacent to the Studio 1 Audience Entrance. The White City Stadium site, in Wood Lane adjacent to the Westway overpass and once part of the Exhibition, is now occupied by White City Place, formerly the BBC Media Village.

=== 1910 Japan-British Exhibition ===
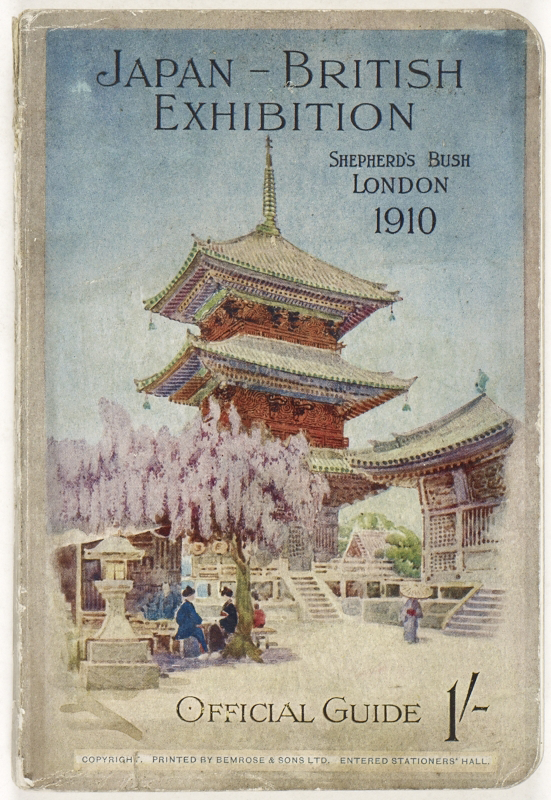
Guidebook of the Japan-British Exhibition of 1910

The Japan-British Exhibition of 1910 (日英博覧会, Nichi-Ei Hakuran-kai) took place on the exhibition site from 14 May 1910 to 29 October 1910. It was the largest international exposition that the Empire of Japan had participated in to date, and was driven by a desire of Japan to develop a more favorable public image in Great Britain following the renewal of the Anglo-Japanese Alliance. It was also hoped that the display of manufactured products would lead to increased Japanese trade with Britain.

Little sign of the exhibition remains, but the Chokushimon (Gateway of the Imperial Messenger, a four-fifths replica of the Karamon of Nishi Hongan-ji in Kyoto) was moved to Kew Gardens a year later, where it still can be seen today.

Two more exhibitions would be held at the Great White City. The final two exhibitions to be held there were the Latin-British Exhibition of 1912 and the Anglo-American Exhibition of 1914, which included a working model of the Panama Canal, a replica of New York City (complete with skyscrapers), and a scale model of the Colorado Grand Canyon. One popular attraction was the 101 Ranch Wild West show which had been shipped over from Oklahoma. The Times reported that "this is the first time that the Miller Brothers cowboys and cowgirls, who come from the 101 Ranch at Bliss, Oklahoma, have performed out of America." However, the coming of war in 1914 would put an early end to the Anglo-American Exhibition, which would prove to be the last of the great exhibitions held in Shepherd's Bush.

=== World War I ===
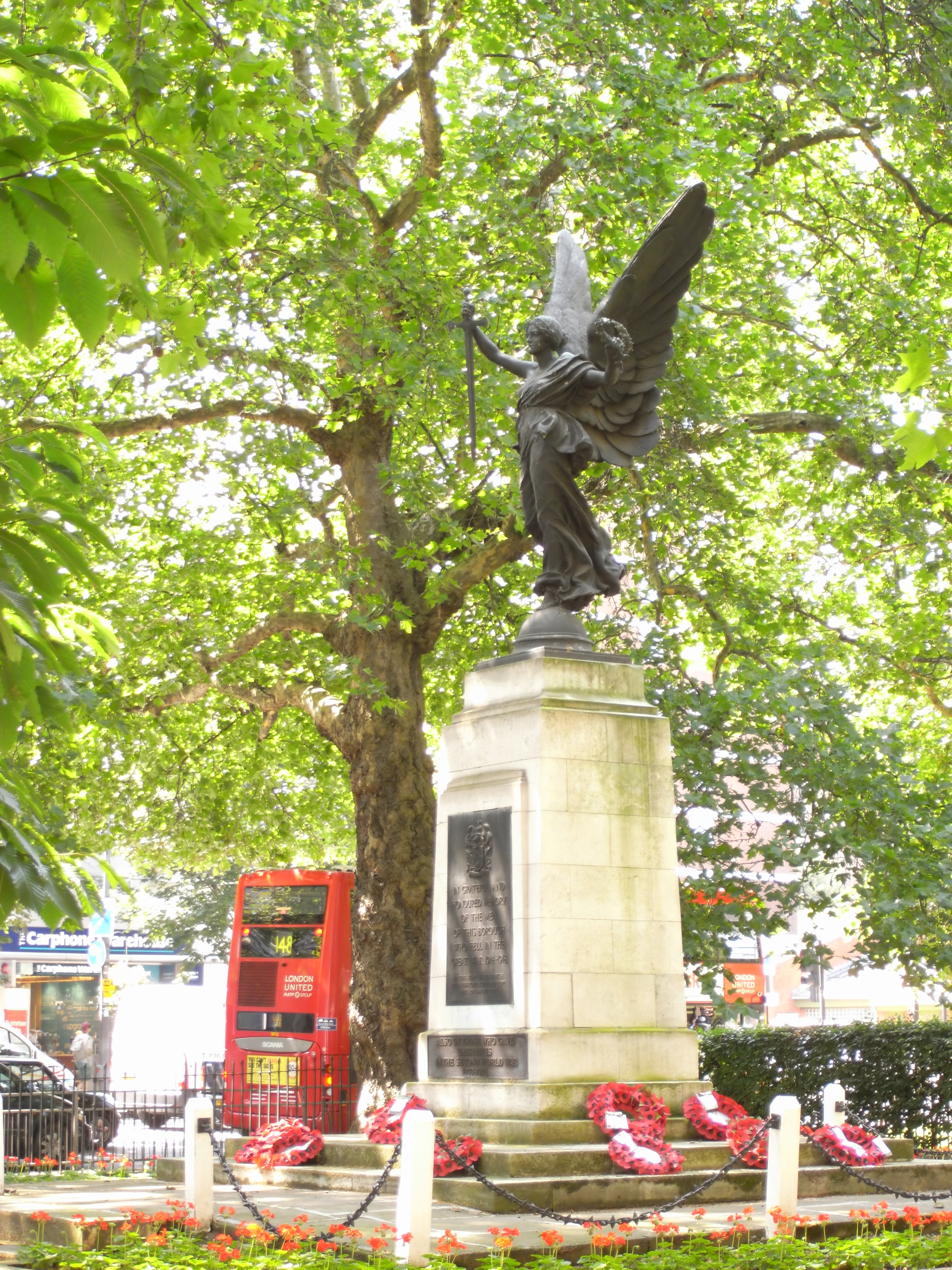
Shepherd's Bush war memorial

When war broke out, the Great White City soon closed, its huge exhibition spaces quickly pressed into war work, serving as assembly sheds for the manufacture of aircraft, run by the Royal Naval Air Service. Many industries sprang up in the former exhibition space in order to help the war effort. Tents were manufactured at Waring & Gillow in the former Machinery Hall, aircraft bodies were made at the Alliance Airplane Company, ammunition made at Blake's ammunition factory.

During World War I a pioneering orthopaedic hospital, the Shepherd's Bush Military Hospital (now known as the Hammersmith Hospital), was built in Shepherd's Bush to care for wounded soldiers, largely thanks to the efforts of the noted surgeon Robert Jones. In 1916 the Joint War Committee awarded the hospital the sum of £1,000 to begin its work, soon followed in 1918 by a further grant of £10,000. The hospital was also supported by donations from the public, this included the Wounded Soldiers Aid committee that organised concerts and food for wounded soldiers which was manned by local volunteers. Part of the rehabilitation process involved putting the recovering patients to work in local shops, a policy which does not appear to have been entirely popular among the soldiers themselves.

War did not prevent the opening of Lime Grove Studios in 1915, a film studio complex built by Gaumont and situated in a street named Lime Grove, in Shepherd's Bush. It was described by Gaumont as "the finest studio in Great Britain and the first building ever put up in this country solely for the production of films". From 1949 to 1991 the complex was used by the BBC, before its demolition in 1994.

Shepherd's Bush Market opened for business in around 1914, with shops lining the railway viaduct between the Uxbridge Road and the Goldhawk Road.

=== Between the wars ===
After the Great War ended, a war memorial dedicated to those residents of Shepherd's Bush who had lost their lives was erected in Shepherd's Bush Green.

In 1923 the Pavilion, later known as the Shepherd's Bush Pavilion, was constructed. Originally built as a cinema, it is today being converted into a hotel, and though most of the building was demolished in 2012, it remains a Grade II listed building.

In the 1930s Alfred Hitchcock filmed sequences for many of his films in Lime Grove Studios, including, in 1935, The 39 Steps.

=== World War II ===
Like other parts of London, Shepherd's Bush suffered from bomb damage during World War II, especially from V-1 flying bomb attacks (known as "doodlebugs" or "buzzbombs"), which struck randomly and with little warning.

Damaged buildings included the Shepherd's Bush Pavilion, the interior of which was destroyed by a flying bomb in 1944. Shrapnel damage can still be seen in the foundation stone of the Shepherd's Bush Village Hall on Wood Lane.

Following the war, the neighbourhood suffered even greater damage from poor planning than it had from the Luftwaffe. The construction of the Westway and the M41 spur (now the West Cross Route) to the M40 motorway cut Shepherd's Bush off from Holland Park, demolishing much Victorian housing including the handsome Royal Hotel, its site being swallowed up by the roundabout. This poor planning led to some of the worst urban blight in London, the area east of the M41 spur becoming a semi-derelict area of breakers' yards and lock-ups.

=== 1960s ===
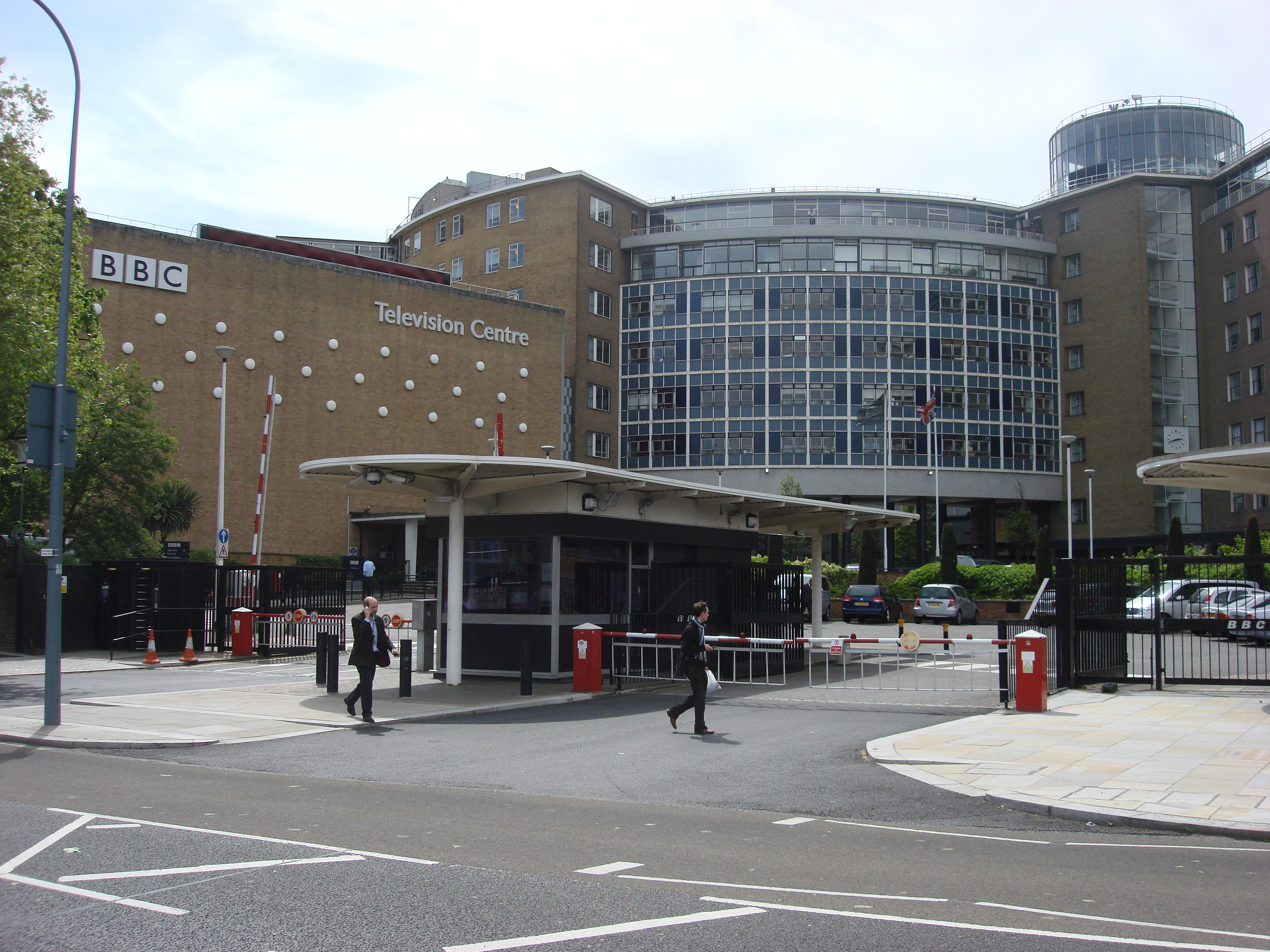
BBC Television Centre, opened in 1960 and now a Grade II Listed Building.

In the 1960s Shepherd's Bush consolidated its position as a media hub, with BBC Television Centre, the headquarters of BBC Television, officially opening on 29 June 1960. Until its closure in 2013 it was one of the largest TV studios in the world, and the second oldest television studios in the United Kingdom after Granada Studios.

In 1961 the former St Andrew's Presbyterian Church in Shepherd's Bush, which had been built in 1870 to a design by Edmund Woodthorpe, was converted into a Roman Catholic church for the Polish community in London and renamed St Andrew Bobola Polish Church.

On 13 April 1963 The Beatles recorded their first ever BBC broadcast at Lime Grove Studios in Shepherd's Bush. The group returned in 1964 for a further recording. Lime Grove Studios was demolished in 1994 to make way for residential accommodation.

In 1966 The World Cup was held in England, and White City stadium was once again the location for a major sporting event – albeit just a single match. White City was used for a single game from Group 1, between Uruguay and France, won by Uruguay.

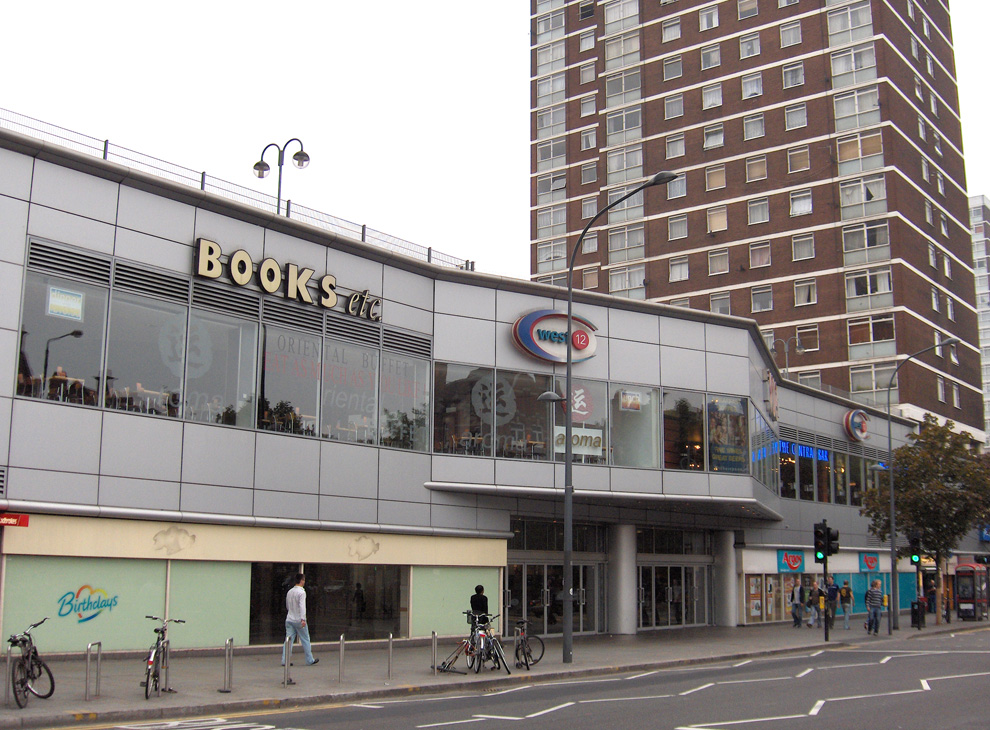
West12 Shopping Centre

The 1960s would bring further development in the form of a huge new modern shopping centre (now known as West 12) on the south side of the Green. A joint venture between Parway Land Investments Ltd, Hammersmith council, the Greater London Council and the Campden Charities, it opened in 1967.

=== 1970s ===
The 1970s saw further changes in Shepherd's Bush. In 1971 the Labour Party took control of Hammersmith and Fulham Council, and would dominate local politics until 2006. The Shepherd's Bush skyline was permanently altered in 1974 when the Labour-controlled Council built four huge public housing towers on the south side of the Green. Bush Court, Shepherd's Court, Woodford Court and Roseford Court are each 20 storeys high, built of steel and concrete in the modern style.

The final shot of the Monty Python team's 'gas man' sketch was filmed in Thorpebank Road, the camera panning along the line of gasmen before John Cleese enters the shot walking down Dunraven Road for the start of the Ministry of Silly Walks sketch.

=== 1980s ===
In 1985 the White City sporting venue was finally demolished and replaced by the BBC White City Centre.

The Shepherd's Bush bus station is housed in the redeveloped Dimco Buildings (1898), Grade II listed red brick buildings which were originally built in 1898 as a shed for a London Underground power station. The Dimco buildings were used as a filming location for the 'Acme Factory' in the 1988 film Who Framed Roger Rabbit, and later served as the interior of the British Museum in The Mummy Returns.

The Shepherd's Bush Empire, since 1953 the home of the BBC, was taken over by entrepreneur Andrew Mahler, who spent £2m on refurbishment, restoring the building and turning it into a music venue for concerts and other events, which it remains to this day.

=== 1990s ===
In 1990 the BBC opened a new office building on Wood Lane (now known as White City One), on part of the former Olympic site. White City One housed most of the BBC's current affairs and factual and learning programmes, such as Panorama, Top Gear, and Watchdog.

In 1993 Lime Grove Studios, where the Beatles recorded, and where Alfred Hitchcock shot sequences for many of his films, was demolished and replaced with residential accommodation.

== Twenty-first century ==
In 2001, BBC Television Centre was damaged by a terrorist car bomb attack, exploding on Wood Lane.

In 2004 the BBC expanded its White City complex, opening the BBC Media Village on part of the former Olympic site.

In 2006 The Conservative Party won control of Hammersmith and Fulham Council, which had been more or less dominated by the Labour party since 1971.

In late 2008 Westfield London shopping centre opened. Its cost was estimated at £1.1bn, built on a site bounded by the West Cross Route (A3220), the Westway (A40) and Wood Lane (A219), and opened on 30 October 2008. The development was on a large brownfield site part of which was once the location of the 1908 Franco-British Exhibition; the initial site clearance demolished the set of halls still remaining from the exhibition. The centre is noted for its size: with a retail floor area of 150,000m² (1.615m ft²), the equivalent of about 30 football pitches. At the time of its opening it was reported to be the third largest shopping centre in the United Kingdom.

The DIMCO buildings became a bus station around the same time, having been restored to their former glory under the supervision of English Heritage.

In October 2011 the Bush Theatre left its home of nearly forty years on Shepherd's Bush Green and moved to the old Shepherd's Bush Library building on Uxbridge Rd. An IBIS hotel opened in 2012 on the South side of the Green.

Between 2012 and 2013 Shepherd's Bush Green was substantially redeveloped. The changes included two new play areas for children, removal of the tennis courts, and the planting of further trees and a general improvement to routes across the Green for both cyclists and pedestrians. A proposal to create a new cafe was declined by the planning authorities.

In 2013 the BBC is left its White City home, as a part of general cost-cutting. The structure was redeveloped is a listed building. The BBC White City buildings, by contrast, are not protected structures.

The Shepherd's Bush Pavilion, originally built as a cinema in 1923, was converted into a luxury hotel, named the Dorsett Regency at the Shepherd's Bush Pavilion, and opened in May 2014.

In August 2016, a fire started in a flat in Shepherd's Bush Green caused damage on five floors of an 18-storey tower block. The fire was thought to have been caused by a faulty tumble dryer which, at the time, was subject to a recall notice and due to be inspected. The government established a Working Group on Product Recalls and Safety after this event, aiming to "improve product safety and recalls to avoid similar events occurring in future".

== Future ==
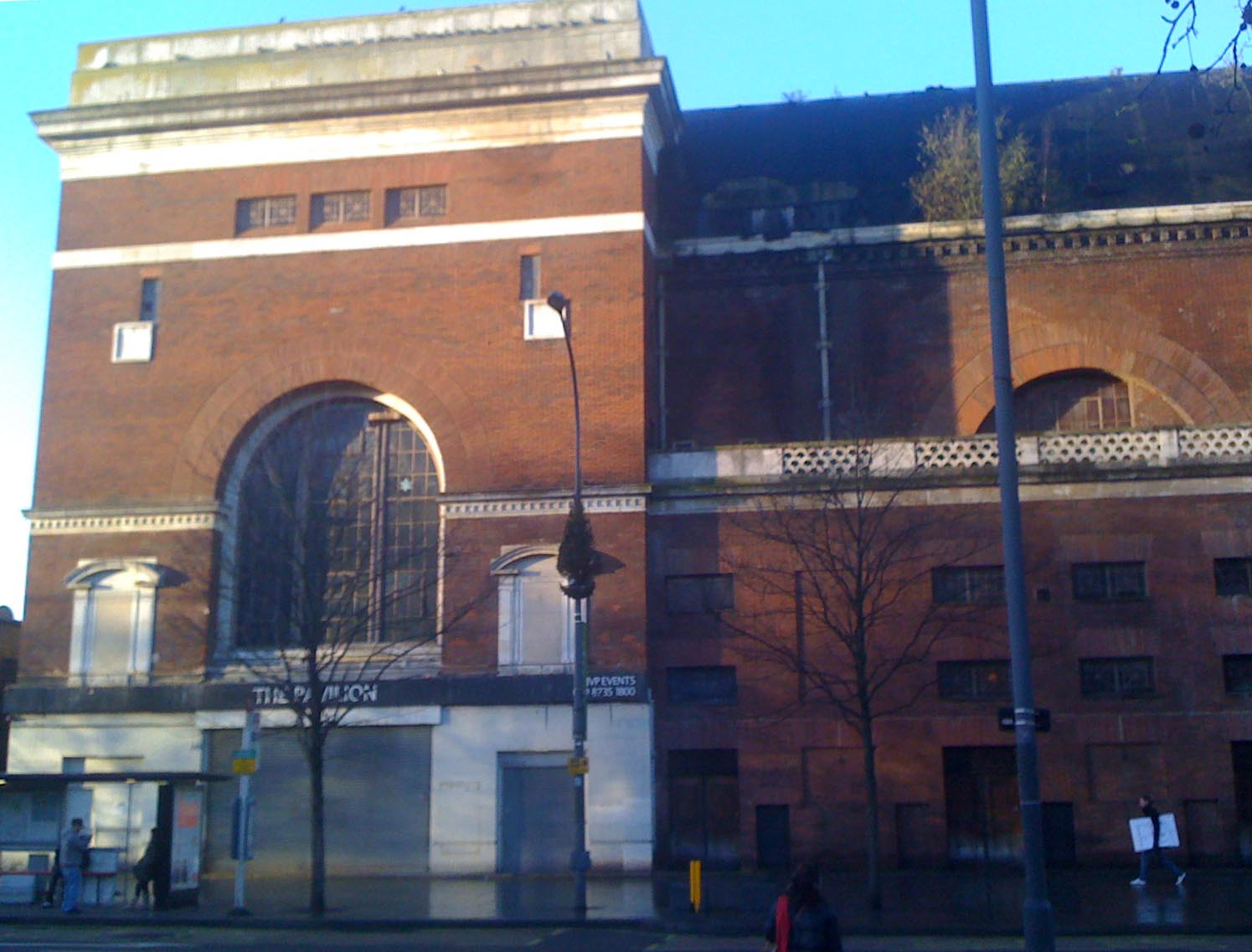
The Shepherd's Bush Pavilion

The Westfield Group has applied for planning permission to extend the Westfield Centre northwards, greatly enlarging its size and scope. The plans would include 1,700 new homes and around 500,000 sq ft of new retail space. Westfield states that the new extension will create 2,500 permanent jobs, and will represent a £1bn investment.

Shepherd's Bush Market is presently the subject of a regeneration plan by the London Borough of Hammersmith and Fulham. In September 2010 a revised planning and regeneration brief was issued. In February 2011 the Fulham and Hammersmith Chronicle reported that plans included 250 flats, and also rehousing the existing tenants, many of whom objected to the plans. In July 2011 former Mayor of London Ken Livingstone visited the market to add his voice to those opposed to the council's plans for regeneration of the area.

== Gallery ==
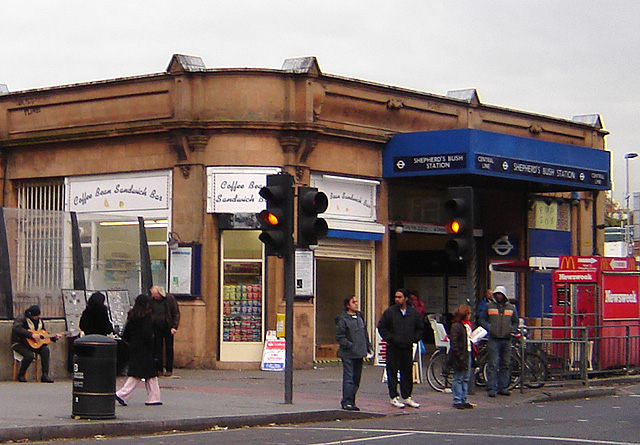
Shepherd's Bush tube station was built in 1900 and demolished in 2008

Map showing history of railways in Shepherd's Bush

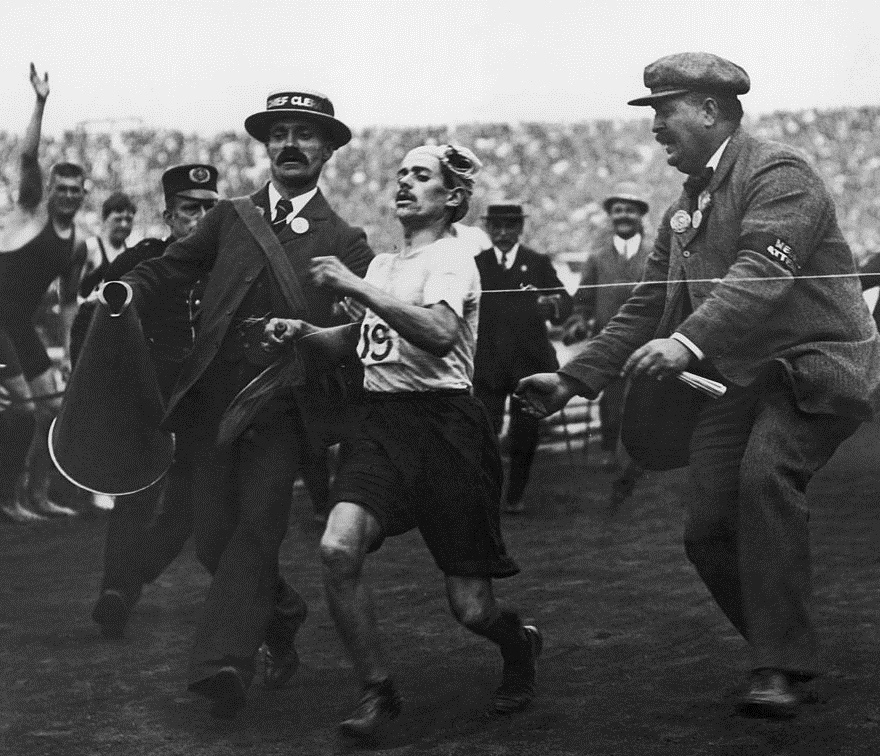
The 1908 Olympic marathon

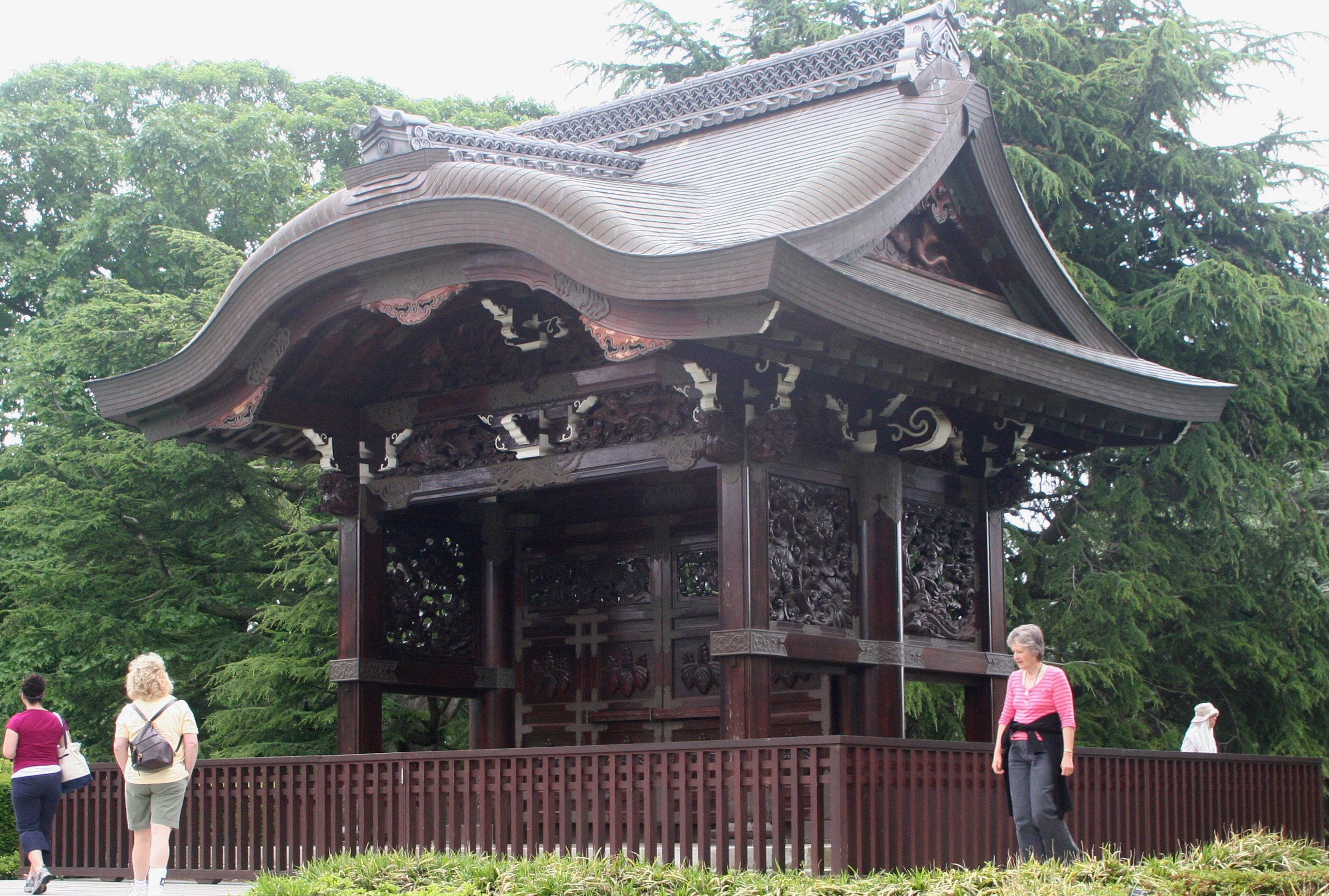
The Japanese Gateway (Chokushi-Mon), formerly part of the Japan-British Exhibition of 1910, now in Kew Gardens

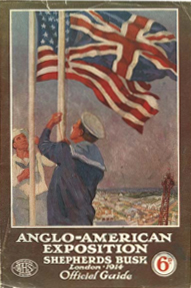
Poster for the Anglo American Exhibition of 1914

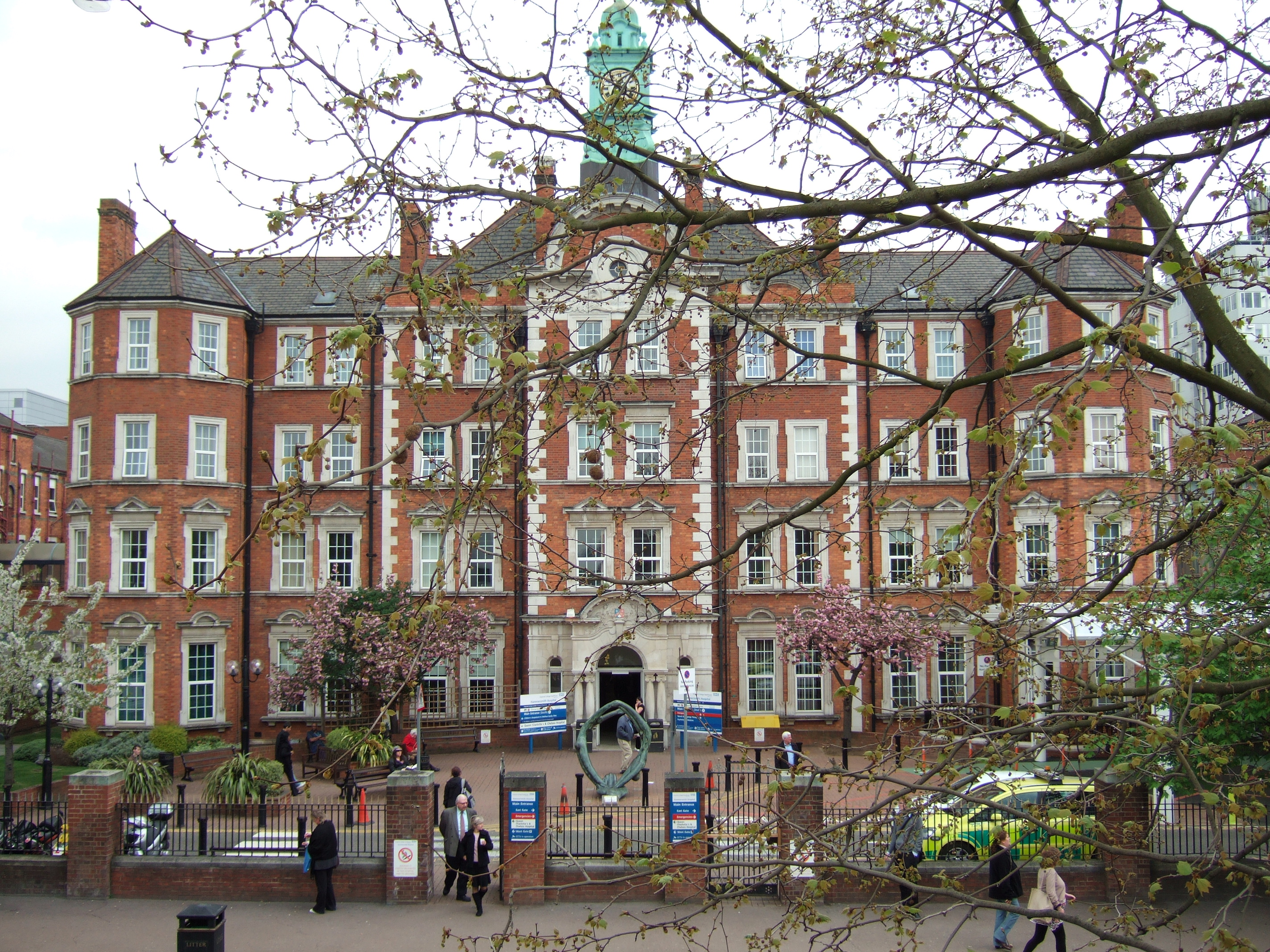
the Hammersmith Hospital, formerly known as the Shepherd's Bush Military Hospital.

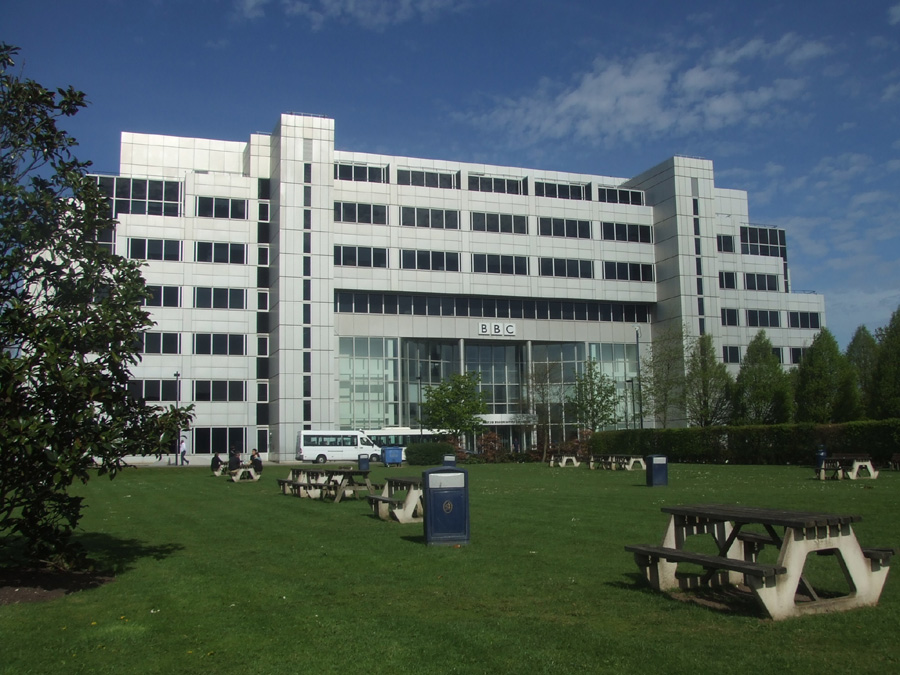
BBC Media Village, White City.

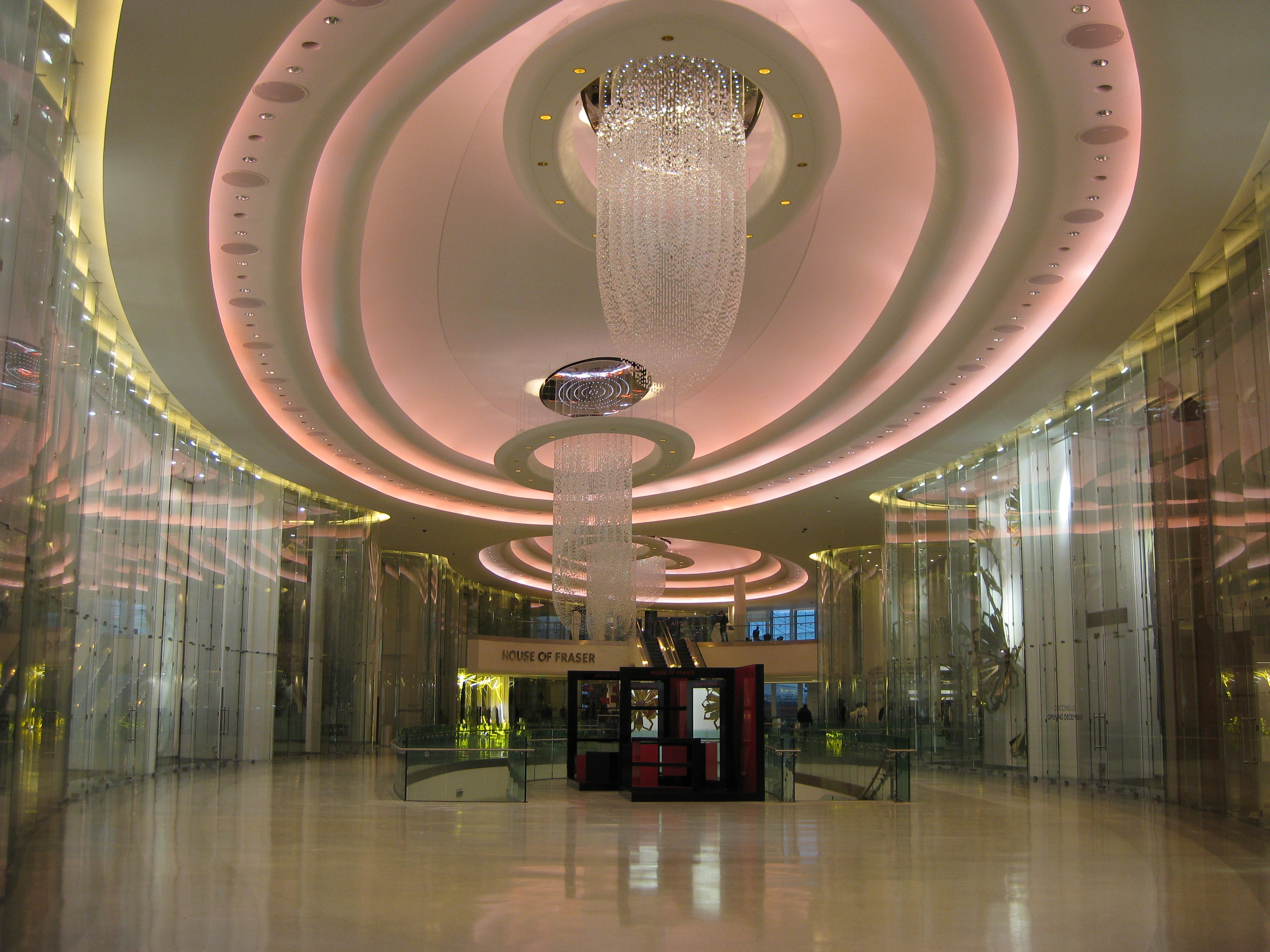
Westfield London interior

== See also ==
- 19th-century London
- Hammersmith and Fulham London Borough Council elections
- History of London
