= Anglo-American Exposition =

1914 exhibition in London, United Kingdom

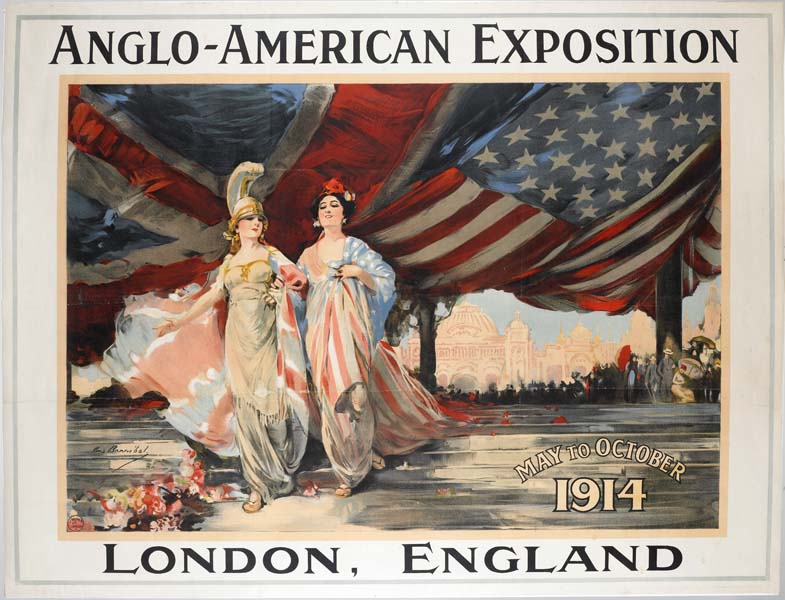
Poster for the Anglo American Exhibition of 1914

The Anglo-American Exposition of 1914 (opened 14 May) was one of the last exhibitions held in Shepherd's Bush, London, in the exhibition space known as the Great White City, and later simply as White City. The exhibition site is now occupied by the BBC White City centre and the Westfield London shopping centre, one of the largest in Britain.

Among the attractions were bands, and one such was the “'American Picaninny Band'”, recruited from a Charleston, South Carolina orphanage, comprising 28 "inmates" of whom around 17 would play at any one time.

Other features included a working model of the Panama Canal, a replica of New York City (complete with skyscrapers), and a scale model of the Colorado Grand Canyon. One popular attraction was the 101 Ranch Wild West show which had been shipped over from Oklahoma. According to The Times “This is the first time that the Miller Brothers cowboys and cowgirls, who come from the 101 Ranch at Bliss, Oklahoma, have performed out of America.”

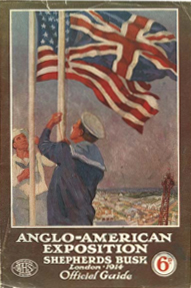
Official Guide of the Anglo-American Exposition

== See also ==
- History of Shepherd's Bush
