= Latin-British Exhibition =

1912 exhibition in Shepherd's Bush, London

Coordinates: 51.511°N 0.224°W

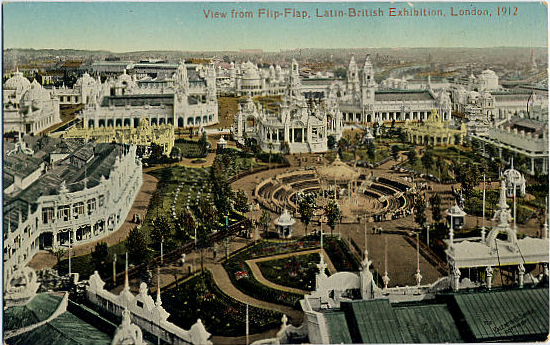
Latin British Exhibition of 1912

The Latin-British Exhibition of 1912 (May 25 to October 19) was the fifth in the series of the White City Exhibitions, after previous exhibitions such as the first Franco-British Exhibition of 1908, and one of the last exhibitions held in Shepherd's Bush, London, in the exhibition space known as the Great White City, and later simply as White City. The exhibition site is now occupied by the BBC White City centre and the Westfield London shopping centre, one of the largest in Britain.

There were reproductions of the cities of Rome, Naples, Venice, Florence, Granada, Toledo, as well as sites in Britain plus native villages from the colonies. Although the amusement section was smaller compared to previous years, it still featured popular exhibits including the Mountain Railway, The House of Troubles, the Great Bostock Jungle, the Spiral Chute, and the Caves of Laughter. Among the attractions was the Flip Flap, a large cable car with views of the city.

== See also ==
- History of Shepherd's Bush
- White City
