= Percival W. Hawkins =

British architect

- Born: London, England
- Died: 1954
- Education: Royal Academy Schools
- Occupation: Architect
- Buildings: Shepherd's Bush Tabernacle, 5 Portland Place

Percival William Hawkins (died 1954) was a British architect known for his contributions to early 20th-century architecture. A Fellow of the Royal Institute of British Architects (RIBA), Hawkins worked in London. Among his surviving buildings is the Shepherd's Bush Tabernacle and 5 Portland Place, London.

== Career ==
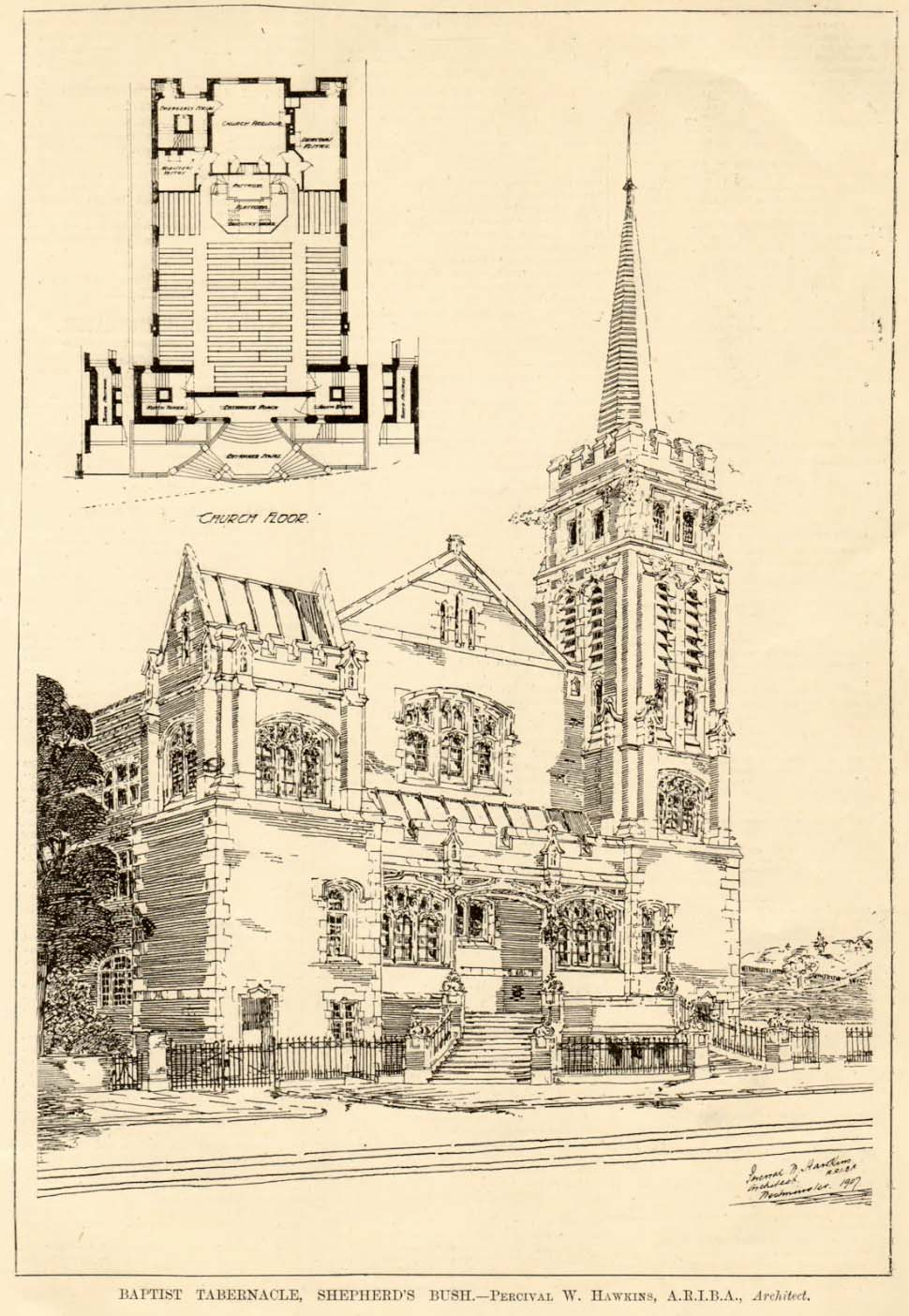
Shepherd's Bush Tabernacle in 1907

In 1904 Hawkins became a member of the Royal Institute of British Architects (RIBA). His last entry in the RIBA directory is dated 1930. The Shepherd's Bush Tabernacle Baptist Church was completed in 1907, following a competition. The building work was carried out by Mr C Gray of Shepherd's Bush. In 1911 he completed 5 Portland Place, with Beaux-Arts details and sculpture at the attic level.

== Death and legacy ==
Hawkins died in 1954. At least two of his buildings, 5 Portland Place and the Shepherd's Bush Tabernacle remain standing.

== See also ==
- Architecture of London
- List of British architects
