= Shepherd's Bush Village Hall =

Coordinates: 51.50573°N 0.22438°W

Shepherd’s Bush Village Hall
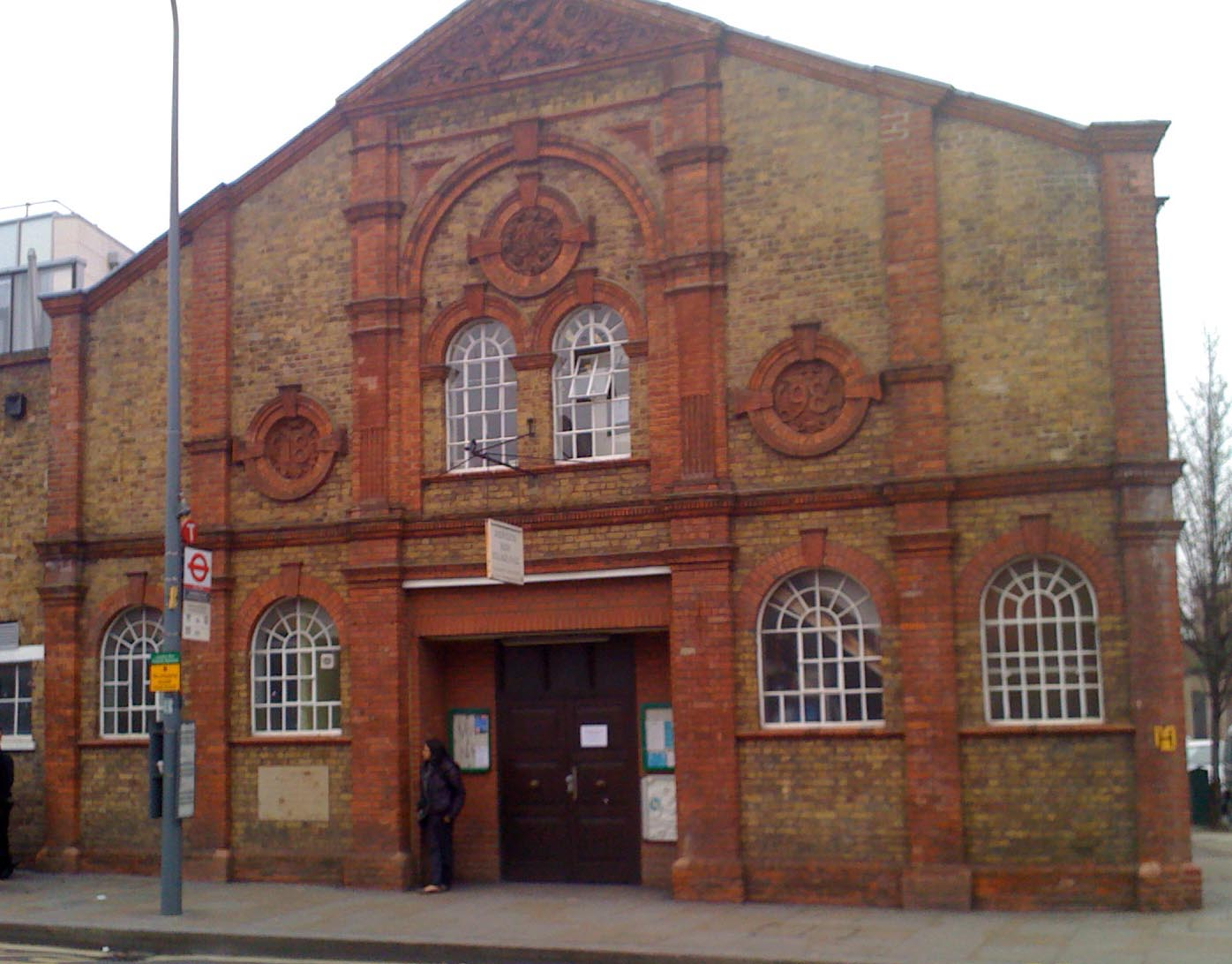
- Shepherd’s Bush Village Hall
- Interactive map of the Shepherd’s Bush Village Hall area

General information
- Type: Village Hall
- Architectural style: Victorian
- Location: Wood Lane, Shepherd's Bush, 58 Bulwer Street, London, W12 8AP, London, England
- Completed: 1898

Technical details
- Structural system: Brick

Design and construction
- Architect: William J. Shearburn

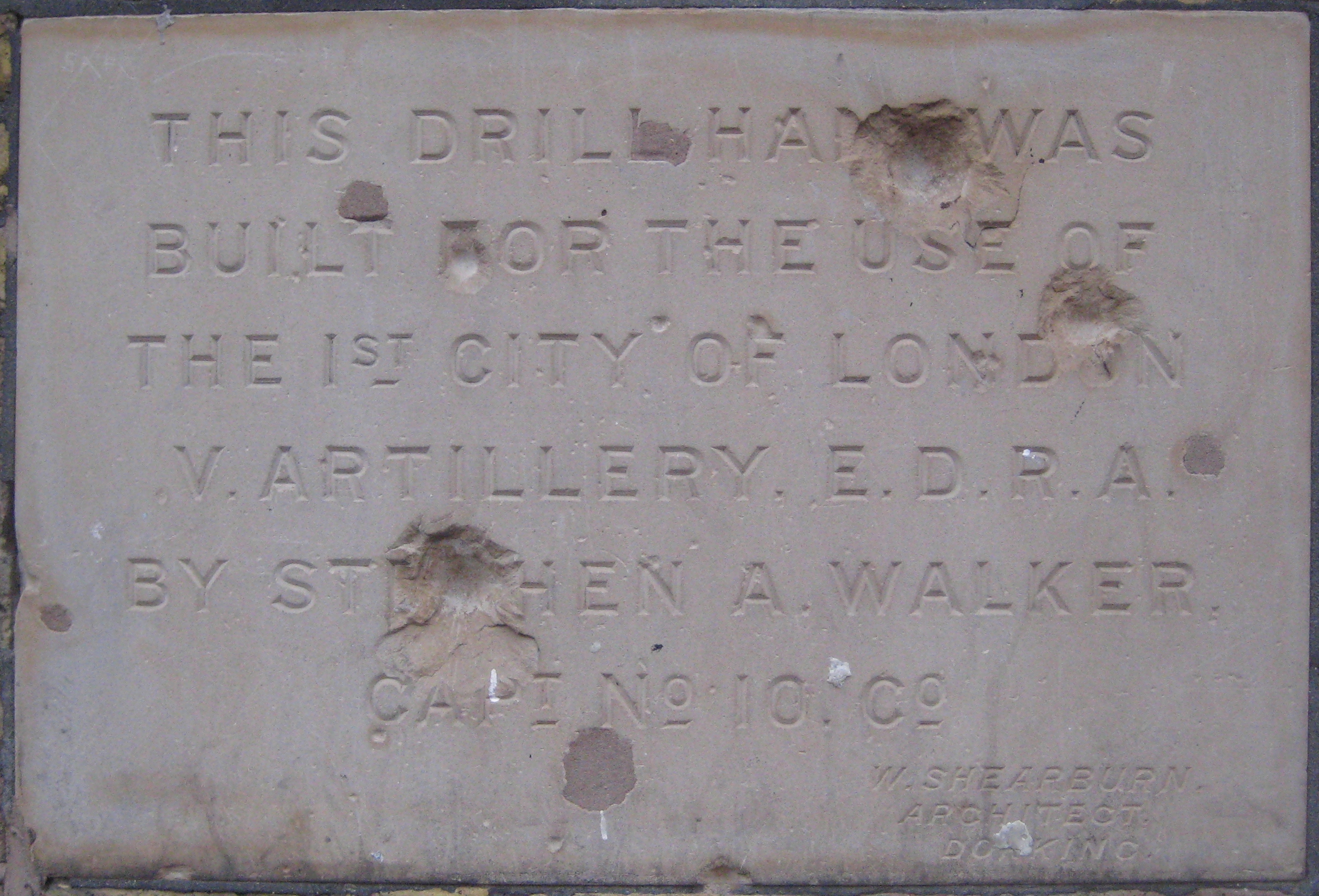
Foundation stone in Shepherd's Bush Village Hall showing shrapnel damage

Shepherd's Bush Village Hall is a Victorian building located on Wood Lane in Shepherd's Bush, London, built in 1898. It was originally constructed as a drill hall for the 1st City of London Volunteer Artillery, but now serves the community as the home of London Vocational Ballet School and West London School of Dance. It was owned by the London Borough of Hammersmith and Fulham until March 2012 when it was sold to the Wigoder Family Foundation.

== History ==
The building was originally constructed as a drill hall. The foundation stone, since damaged by shrapnel (presumably during WW2), at Shepherd's Bush Village Hall reads as follows:

This drill hall was built for the use of the 1st City of London Volunteer Artillery E.D.R.A, by Stephen A. Walker, Captain No 10 Company. W. Shearburn, architect, Dorking.

EDRA stands for "Eastern Division Royal Artillery".

=== WWI ===
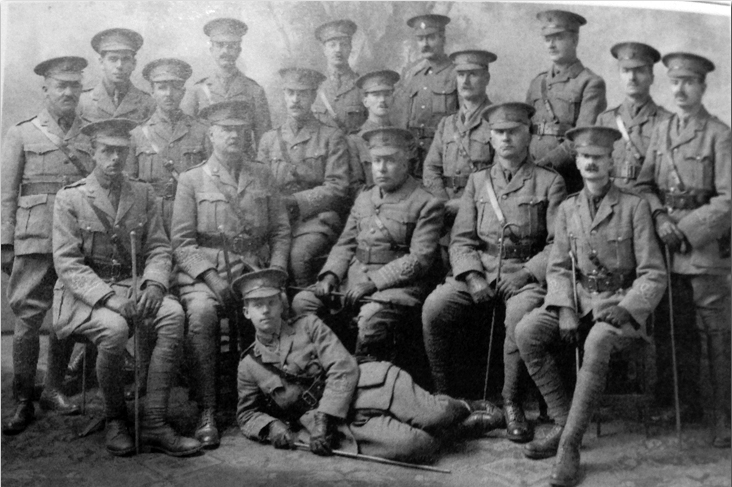
Officers of the C Company of Bushmen (West London Volunteers) 1915. The commander, Sir William Bull MP, is in the centre of the group. The Bushmen were a Home Defence Volunteer Corps, composed of men considered not fit for active duty in the armed services. They had to provide their own equipment and uniforms.

During the Great War, the Hammersmith and Fulham Volunteer Regiment was formed, an amalgamation of the Bushmen and the West London Volunteer Corps, named the 20th (Hammersmith) Battalion County of London Regiment. It was composed of four companies, and two of these, the ‘A’ and the ‘B’ Company met at the Drill Hall. The Bushmen (presumably a punning reference to field regiments raised during the Boer War) had their own marching song, which was composed by a local volunteer, Mr Alfred Whittell:

"We are the merry Bushmen on the march again,
A-singing some refrain,
A good song makes you swing along,
Let it go! Might and main,
We are the merry Bushmen on the march again,
A good sport every man,
Light and Hearty, we’re an optimistic party,
The jolly Old Bushmen on the march again."

=== Modern era ===
The hall was used in the 1960s as a rehearsal facility for Doctor Who.

In early 2012 the London Borough of Hammersmith and Fulham, owners of the Shepherd's Bush Village Hall, announced that the building had been sold to the Wigoder Family Foundation, a charitable foundation established by British entrepreneur Charles Wigoder with the aim of supporting a wide range of charitable causes.

The Council stated that it intended to spend the proceeds of the sale on front-line services, and to reduce its outstanding debt which at the time stood at £133 million. Among the charities which will continue to rent space in the Hall are The West London School of Dance who currently occupy the ground floor hall of the building.

Shepherd's Bush Village Hall is not a listed building but it falls within the Shepherd's Bush Conservation Area, an area designated by the London Borough of Hammersmith and Fulham as worthy of special protection.

== See also ==
- History of Shepherd's Bush
- List of units of the British Army Territorial Force 1908
- Territorial Army (United Kingdom)
