= Franco-British Exhibition =

Exhibition (World's Fair) held in London

Coordinates: 51°30′44″N 0°13′46″W

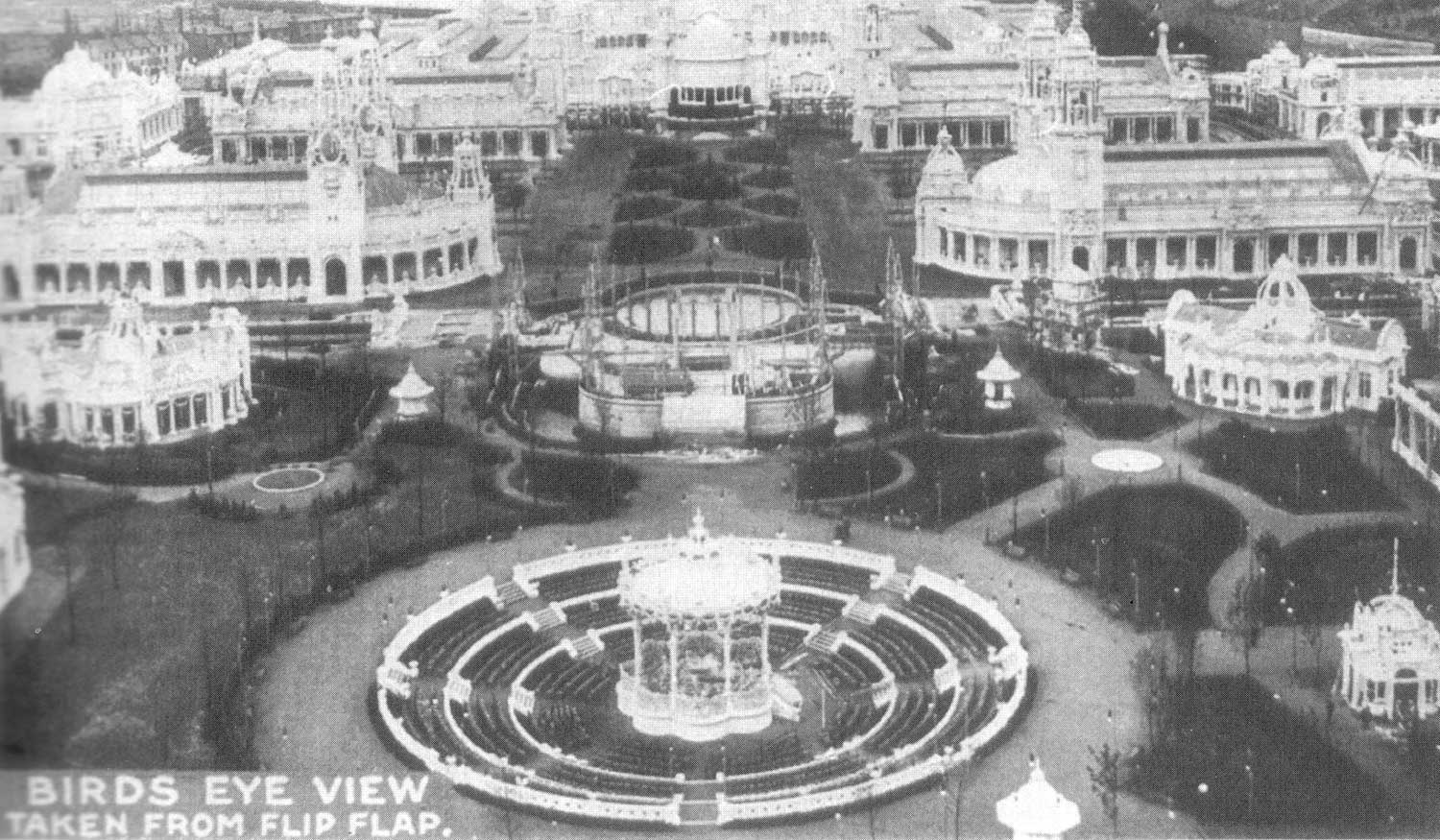
Bird's eye view of the exhibition area

The Franco-British Exhibition was a large public fair held in London between 14 May and 31 October 1908. It was the first in the series of the White City Exhibitions. The exhibition attracted 8 million visitors and celebrated the Entente Cordiale signed in 1904 by the United Kingdom and France. The chief architect of the buildings was John Belcher.

The Exhibition was held in an area of west London near Shepherd's Bush which is now called White City: the area acquired its name from the exhibition buildings which were all painted white. The 1908 Summer Olympics fencing events were held in the district alongside the festivities.

== Attractions ==
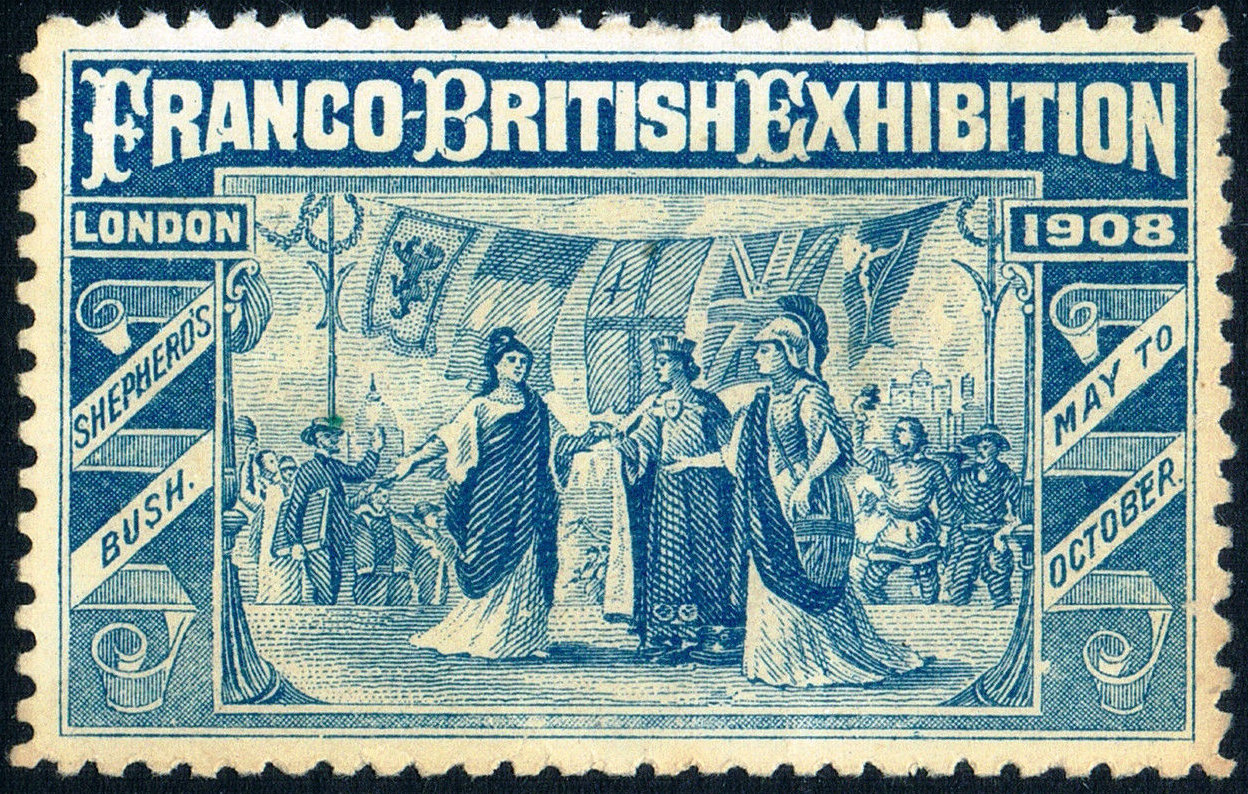
Franco–British Exhibition 1908 souvenir stamp

The fair was the first international exhibition co-organised and sponsored by two countries. It covered an area of some 140 acres (57 hectares), including an artificial lake, surrounded by an immense network of white buildings in elaborate (often Oriental) styles.

The most popular attractions at the exhibition were the two so-called "colonial villages"—an "Irish village" and a "Senegalese village", which were designed to communicate the success of imperialism. The Irish village ("Ballymaclinton") was inhabited by 150 "colleens" (Irish girls) who demonstrated various forms of domestic industry, as well as displays of manufacturing and even an art gallery. The "Senegalese village" was a so-called "native village" displaying day-to-day life, as well as various artefacts. Press reports commented on the "surprising cleanliness" of the Irish, while readers were reminded that the Senegalese were "cleaner than they looked".

Also exhibited was Locomotive No.516 from the South Eastern & Chatham Railway (SE&CR) with a tri-composite railway brake carriage.

Limericks were used to advertise this event:

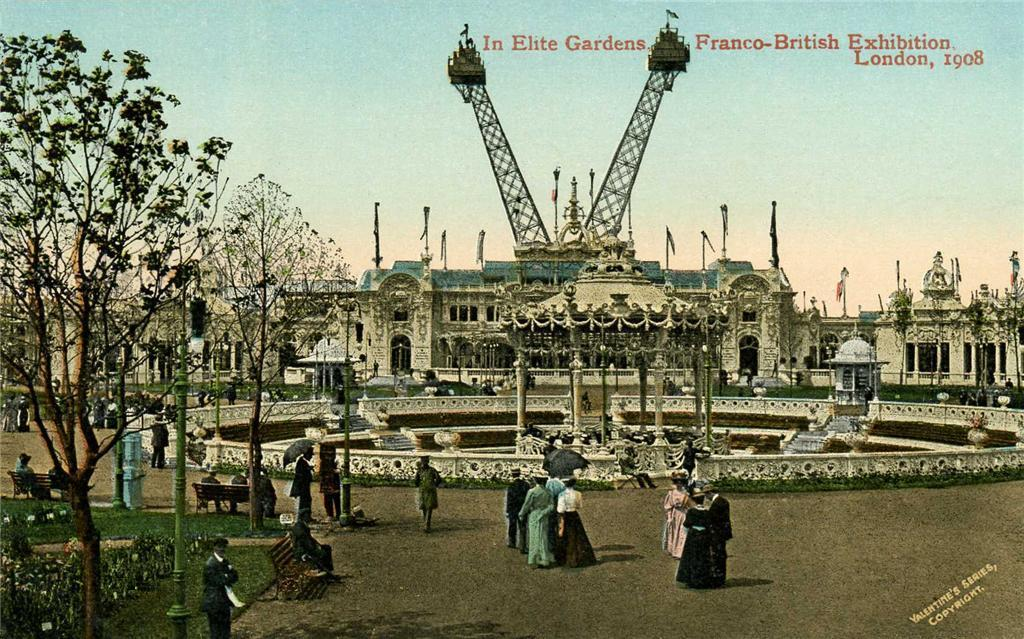
In Elite Gardens

A maiden of coy disposition,
Met her fate at the Bush Exhibition,
When his great love he told her,
Placed her head on his shoulder,
And enjoyed the happier position.

In an Anglo-French section one night,
A Youth met a Maiden, gay and bright,
But her idea of pleasure,
Was of such boundless measure,
He left with heart heavy – purse light.

In 1937, a large portion of the White City site was cleared to make way for a housing estate. During the clearance, the Flip Flap, and a number of other White City structures, were sold for scrap to the steel firm George Cohen, Sons and Co Limited—the same company who had dismantled the Great Wheel of the Earl's Court Exhibition, and went on to dismantle the Skylon, dome, and ten other buildings, at the Festival of Britain site in 1952.

== Balloon accident ==
On 14 August 1908, a balloon owned by American balloonist Captain Thomas Turpin Lovelace (1873–1964) exploded at the exhibition, killing his 18-year-old female secretary and a male employee. Six others were injured, including a 47-year-old employee who died days after the accident. Newspaper reports indicated that the explosion occurred when a lighted match was thrown to the ground during preparations for a flight.

== In literature and popular culture ==
Neil Munro gives a satirical account of a visit to the Franco-British Exhibition in his Erchie Macpherson story "At the Franco-British Exhibition" first published in the Glasgow Evening News of 4 July 1908.

== Subsequent site use ==
After being used for four more exhibitions up to 1914, the site fell into disrepair and was unused for over twenty years. It was then demolished bit by bit to make way for various developments over the last century. First in the 1930s the housing estate in the North of the site, now centred on Commonwealth Avenue, then the Territorial Army (TA) took over a corner on South Africa Road in WW2, The BBC took over much of the remaining site from the 1950s onwards with the BBC Television Centre (now itself being developed into the 'Television Centre' flats, studios and retail), BBC Media Village and BBC Worldwide buildings and in the early 2000s the last buildings on the East of Wood Lane were demolished to make way for the Westfield London development.

Only the internal structure of the TA building on South Africa Road remains from the numerous halls and ornate buildings of the original exhibition. Hammersmith Park, at the north of Frithville Gardens, was once part of the Japanese Garden, and is the only part of the 1910 Japan-British Exhibition, held on the site, still visible. A small area of tiling preserved from the Garden could be seen inside the main Television Centre site adjacent to the Studio 1 Audience Entrance. The White City Stadium site, in Wood Lane adjacent to the Westway overpass and once part of the Exhibition, is now occupied by the BBC Media Village.

== See also ==
- Latin-British Exhibition
- History of Shepherd's Bush
- List of world's fairs

== Bibliography ==
- Franco-British Exhibition, London 1908. Official Guide, London: Bemrose & Sons Ltd, 1908
- Franco-British Exhibition, London, 1908. Fine Arts Catalogue, London: Bemrose & Sons Ltd, 1908
- Geppert, Alexander C.T., Fleeting Cities. Imperial Expositions in Fin-de-Siècle Europe, Basingstoke/New York: Palgrave Macmillan, 2010. ISBN 978-0-230-22164-2
- Gill, Andrew, The Franco-British 'White City' London Exhibition of 1908, CreateSpace Independent Publishing Platform, 2015
- Knight, Donald R., The Exhibitions: Great White City Shepherds Bush London: 70th Anniversary 1908-1978, London: privately published, 1978
- Knight, Donald R., The Exhibitions: Great White City, Shepherds Bush, London: 100th Anniversary of the Franco-British Exhibition, 1908 - 2008, London: privately published, 2008
