= Shepherd's Bush Tabernacle =

Coordinates: 51.5029°N 0.2225°W

Great Commission Ministry Church (formerly Shepherd's Bush Tabernacle)
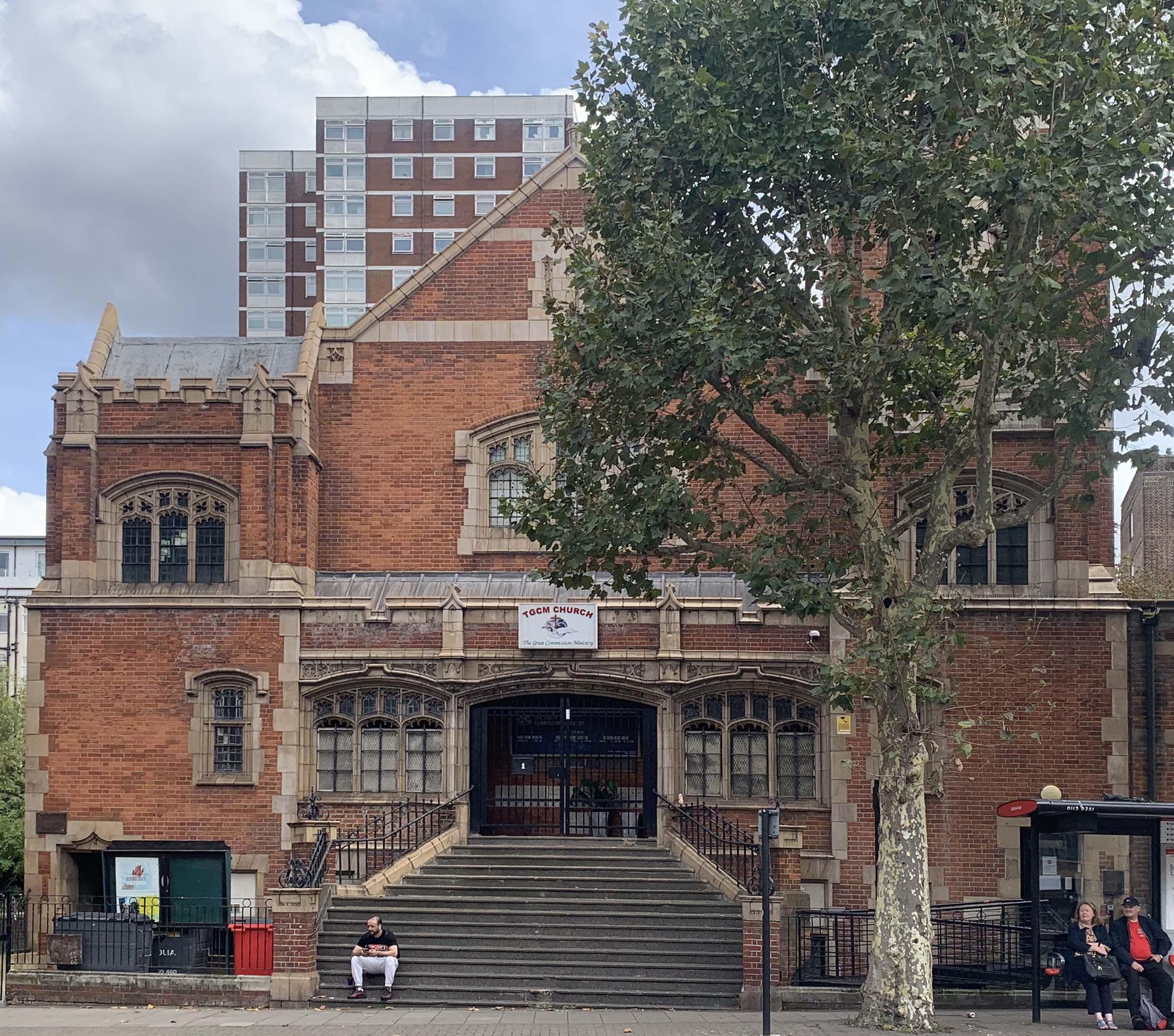
- The former Shepherd’s Bush Tabernacle building, later occupied by the Great Commission Ministry Church
- Great Commission Ministry Church (formerly Shepherd's Bush Tabernacle)
- Location: Shepherd's Bush, London, W6
- Country: England
- Denomination: Independent Evangelical (formerly Baptist)

Architecture
- Functional status: Church building
- Architect: Percival. W. Hawkins
- Style: Edwardian, Arts & Crafts

Great Commission Ministry Church (formerly the Shepherd's Bush Tabernacle Baptist Church) is an Edwardian church building situated on Shepherd's Bush Road in Shepherd's Bush, London, just off Shepherd's Bush Green. Established as a Baptist congregation in the late 1800s, the present building was completed in 1907 and was later occupied by the evangelical group Great Commission Ministry. It was designed and built in the Edwardian Arts & Crafts style by architect Percival W. Hawkins.

== History ==
=== Founding and Baptist origins ===
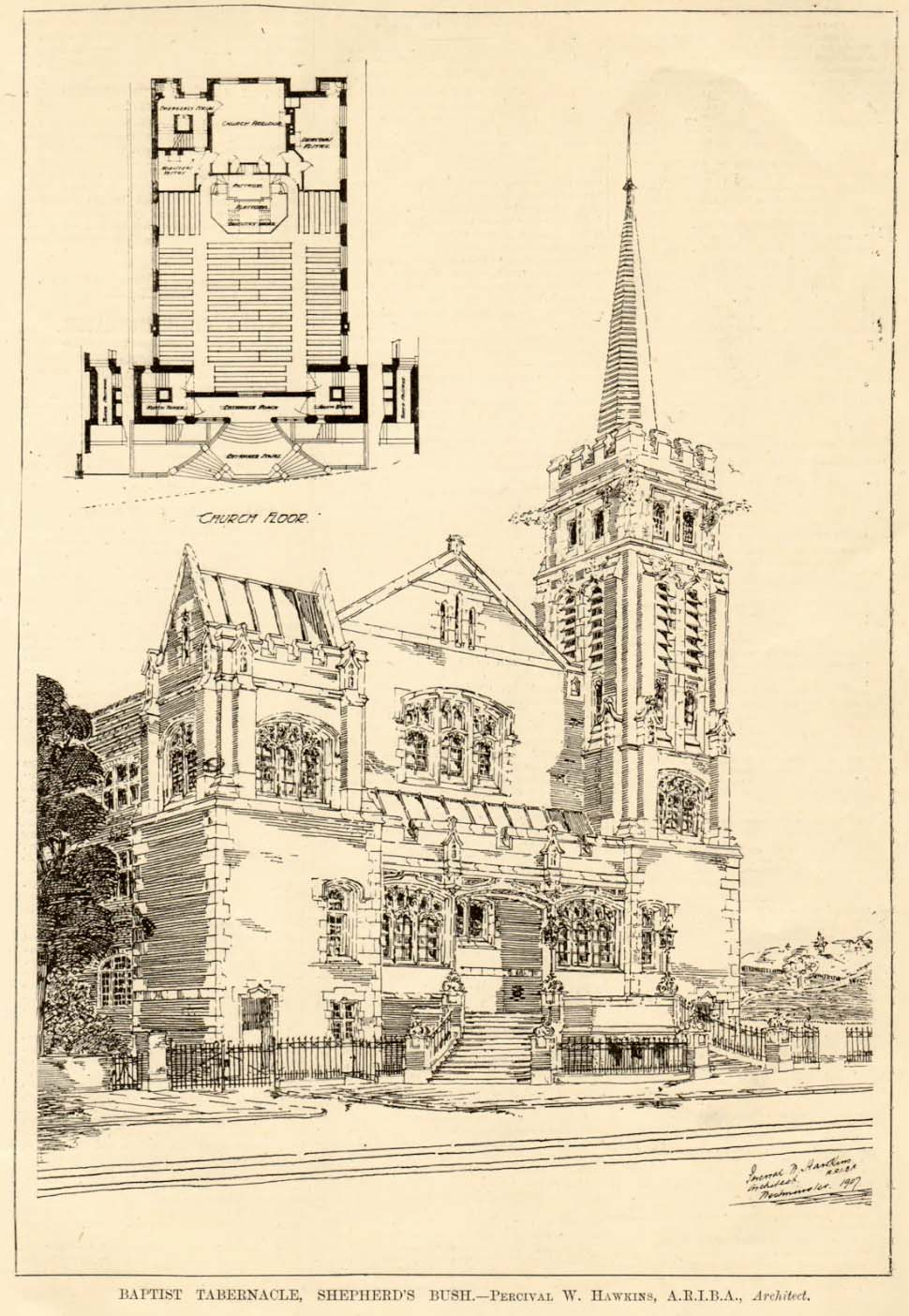
Shepherd's Bush Tabernacle in 1907

The church's origins trace back to the formation of a new Baptist congregation on 13 November 1891, when fifty members formally registered, with initial services held in Athenaeum Hall, Godolphin Road. Initially the congregation met in a tent, and later, in the 1890s, in a corrugated iron shed.

The dedicated church building, known as Shepherd's Bush Tabernacle Baptist Church, was completed in 1907. It was designed by architect Percival W. Hawkins and is locally listed as a building of merit, located within the Shepherd's Bush conservation area. The building work was carried out by Mr C Gray of Shepherd's Bush.

=== Later Occupation by Great Commission Ministry ===
In around 2010, the church was occupied by the Great Commission Ministry, an evangelical Christian group. It retained use as a place of worship under this new organisation until around 2021.

=== Fire Damage ===
In April 2012 a fire that began in an adjoining hostel spread and caused significant damage to the church's roof. Fire crews responded with over 80 firefighters and 15 fire engines; fortunately, there were no injuries. A woman was arrested for suspected arson. After the fire the church brought legal proceedings against the housing association Carr Gomm.

=== Memorial Hall ===
Behind the main church is a hall originally serving as the church hall, known as the Shepherd's Bush Tabernacle Memorial Hall. It commemorates those who fell in World War I.

== Architecture ==
The building was designed by P. W. Hawkins, completed in 1907, and is considered a locally significant structure within a conservation area.

== Legacy and Status ==
As of 2021, the building has ceased regular church use.
