= White City Place =

Office complex and former Olympic stadium site in White City, London

Coordinates: 51°30′50″N 0°13′36″W

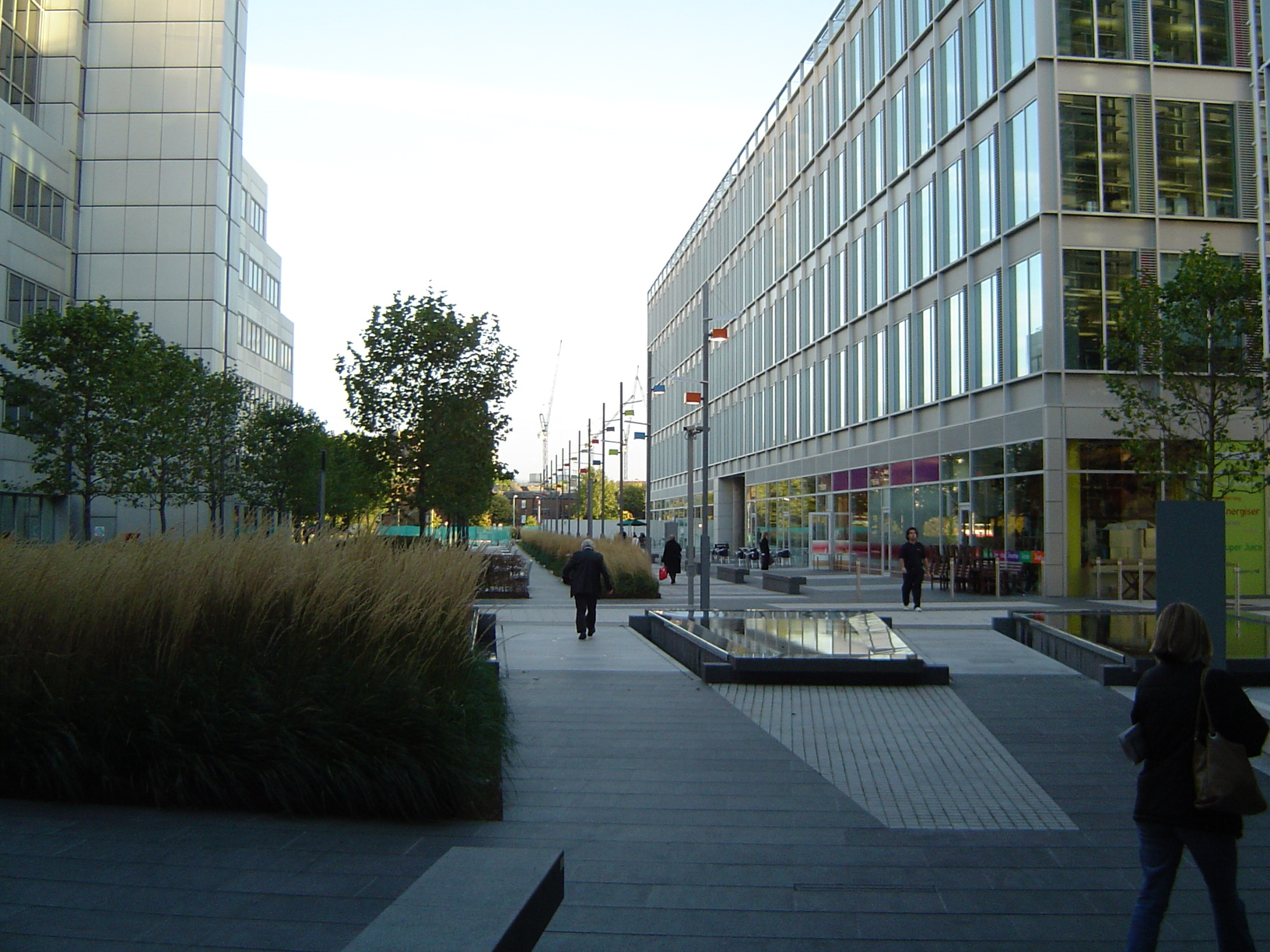
The BBC Media Village plaza in 2004

White City Place is a collection of six buildings occupying a 17-acre site off Wood Lane in White City, West London, bordered by South Africa Road, Dorando Close and the A40 Westway. The site is a short distance along Wood Lane from Television Centre. The properties were completed, in stages, from 1990 to 2004, on the portions of the site of the 1908 Franco-British Exhibition and the adjoining White City Stadium. Built for the BBC, the office complex was called BBC Media Village until the BBC sold it in 2015 (though leasing space in two buildings – Broadcast Centre and the Lighthouse), with new owners Stanhope and Mitsui Fudosan giving the complex its current name. Together with Television Centre, it is sometimes known in the broadcasting industry by the metonym "W12", after its W12 postcode.

== BBC White City ==
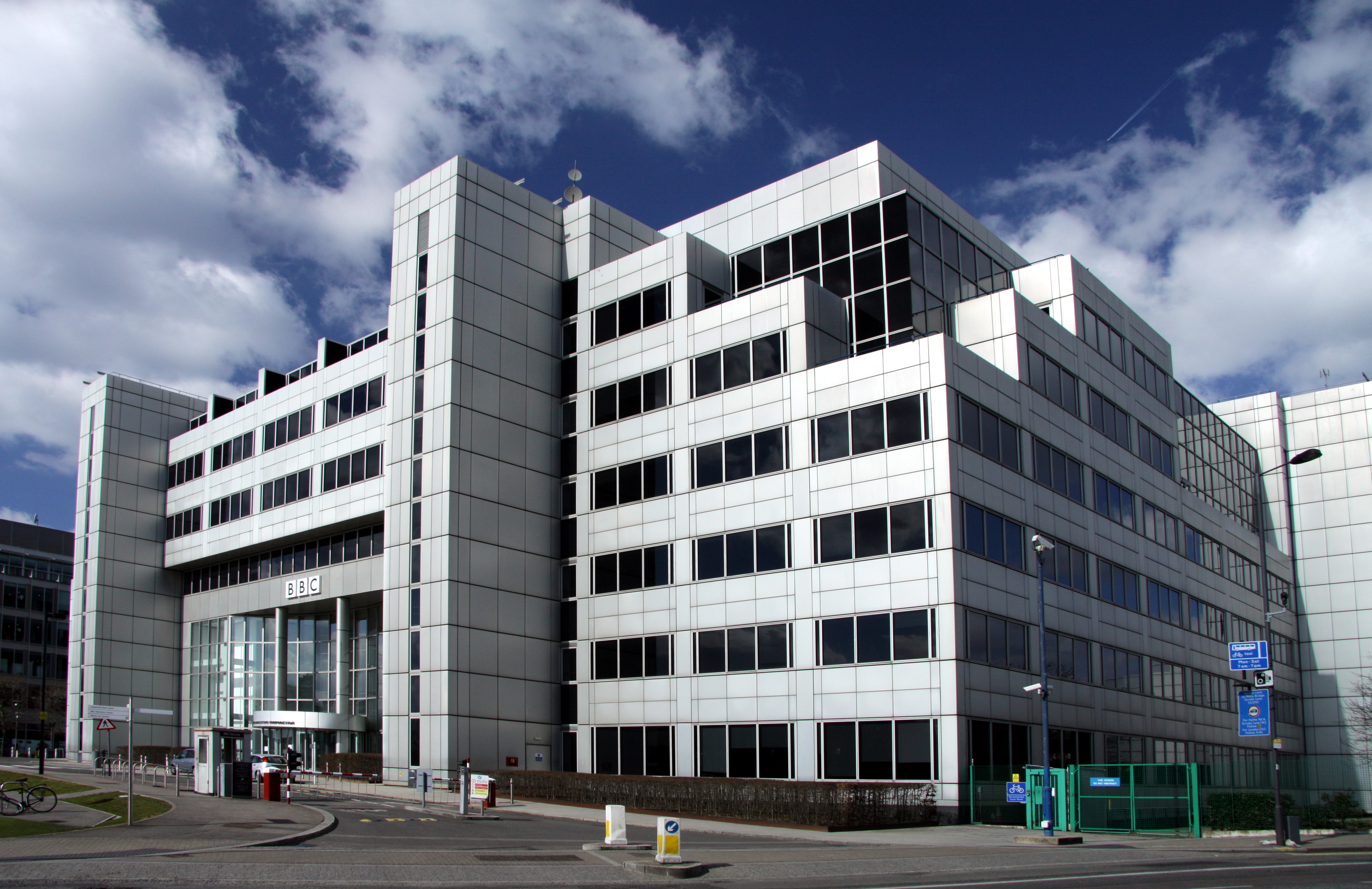
White City One in 2013

The first building on the site, BBC White City, was designed by architects Scott Brownrigg & Turner and was opened in 1990. Built on the site of the 1908 Franco-British Exhibition, BBC White City was constructed on the location of the former White City Stadium (The Great Stadium) used for the 1908 Summer Olympics. The stadium was demolished in 1985 and parts of the Olympic swimming pool were discovered when the foundations of the new building were laid.

The building was originally intended to be a new home for BBC Radio, replacing Broadcasting House. This plan was scrapped and the building instead became office space with fifty edit suites, various television production teams, the digital switchover team, BBC Academy, the Children in Need charity and parts of operations and HR, as well as a large restaurant.

It housed most of the BBC's current affairs and factual and learning programmes, such as Panorama, Top Gear (where it featured in a series 10 segment about the Peel P50), Watchdog and many others. The BBC vacated the building in March 2013 and sold it to developers. It has sometimes been referred to as White City One to distinguish it from the wider site.

Architectural critic Jonathan Glancey wrote in The Guardian in 2002 that by comparison to the "handsome, if timeworn ships of the line" such as Broadcasting House and Bush House, BBC White City was "a tin-pot freighter, inefficient, ugly, and old before its time." Rachid Errtibi, a facilities coordinator at the BBC reflected that "most staff disliked the White City building for one reason or another [but] the building did have a unique character, and was flexible enough to accommodate any new departments at short notice – achieved simply and quickly by putting up a few glass partition panels and rearranging furniture, at minimum cost."

== Media Village ==
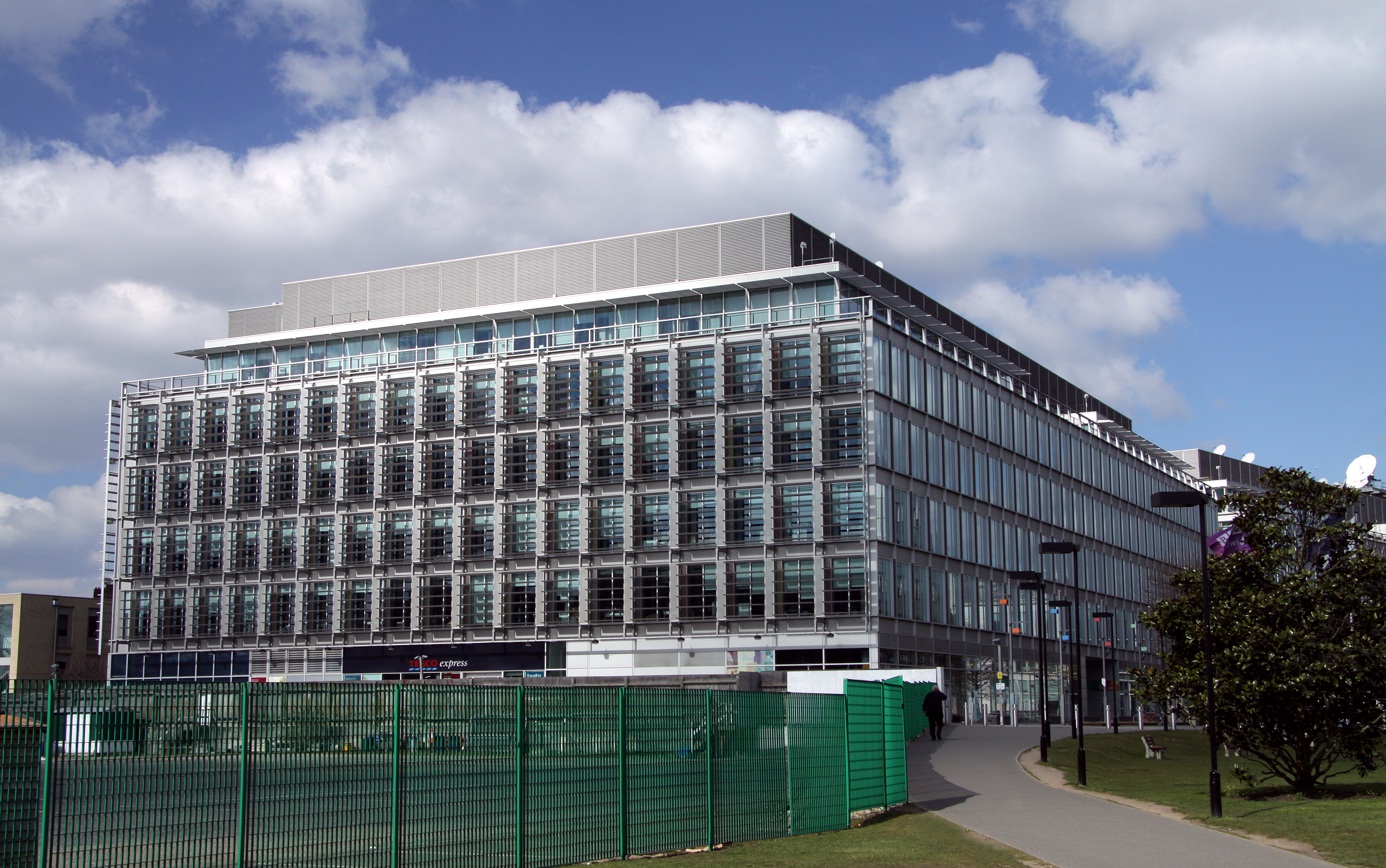
BBC Media Centre in 2013. The fenced area at the front of the building was the intended site for the cancelled Music Box building.

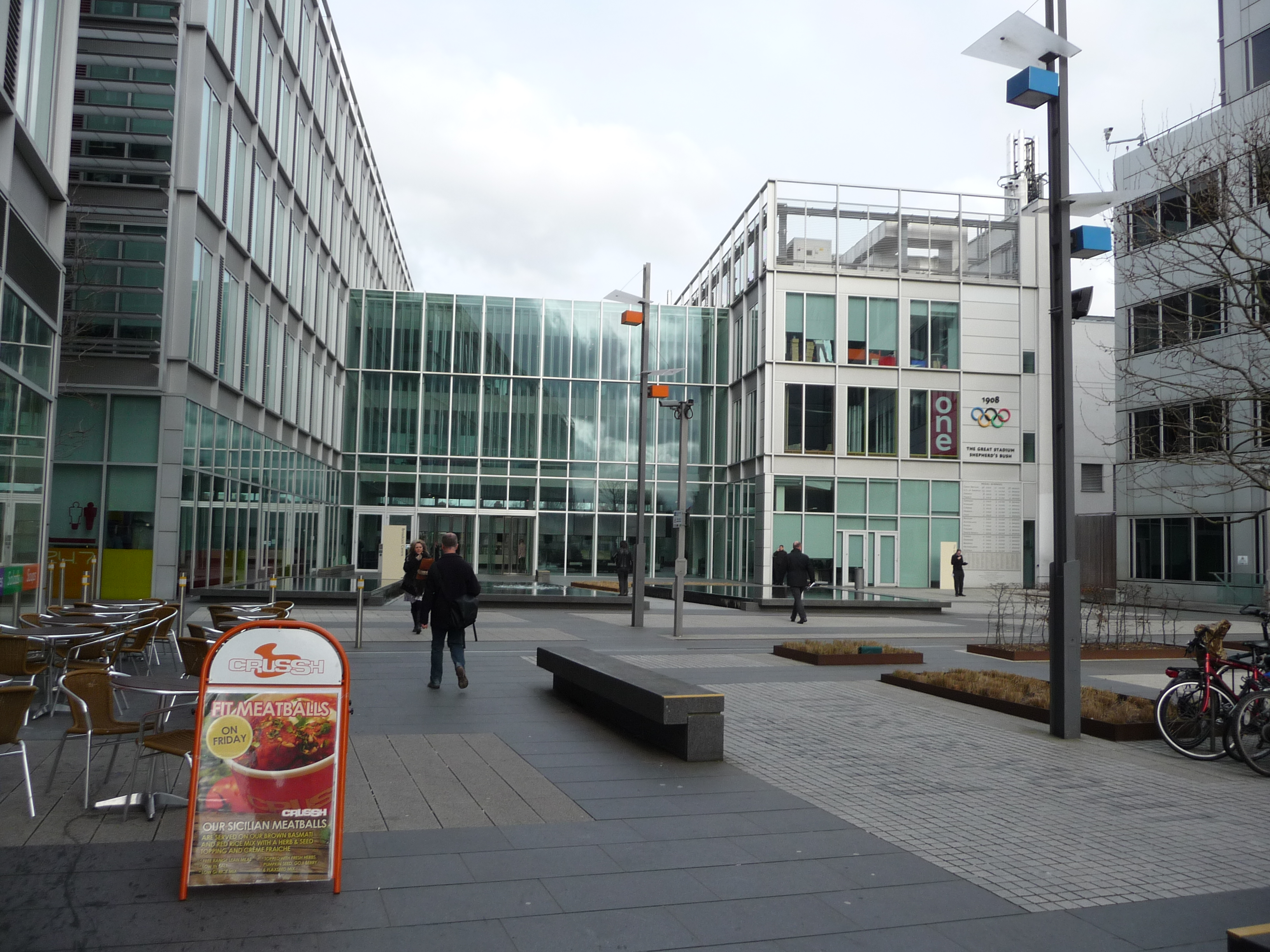
BBC Broadcast Centre and Energy Centre in 2010. The One Show was broadcast from a studio in Energy Centre until 2013. The Olympic Rings mark the finishing line of the 1908 Olympic marathon.

=== Development ===
Construction of the second phase of the development began in September 2001 and the site was officially opened in May 2004 and was known as the Media Village. It consists of five further buildings in addition to White City One – Media Centre, Broadcast Centre, Energy Centre, Garden House and the Lighthouse. The buildings were designed by Allies and Morrison Architects and Buro Happold and built by Bovis Lend Lease. In addition to BBC offices, the site included a post office, a Tesco Express, a Starbucks, a Davy's wine bar and several other retail outlets, many of which have now been replaced. To pay for construction costs, the BBC signed a 30-year deal with Land Securities Trillium, Britain's largest property developer.

The rear of Media Centre included gardens designed by Christopher Bradley-Hole. A poem Voices of White City by Poet Laureate Andrew Motion was inlaid into the paving in the piazza. The site featured artworks such as Simon Patterson's art wall in Broadcast Centre which is based on First World War dazzle camouflage and Yuko Shiraishi's mural in Media Centre reception. She was also responsible for the overall colour scheme in both buildings. Energy Centre features the Olympic rings as a marker of the finishing line of the 1908 Olympic marathon, with a plaque unveiled by IOC president Jacques Rogge in 2005.

A further planned building, the Music Box, designed by Foreign Office Architects was originally scheduled for opening in 2006, but was cancelled in 2008 before construction began. It would have been a concert hall and recording venue for the BBC Symphony Orchestra and BBC Symphony Chorus, the BBC Concert Orchestra and the BBC Singers.

=== Occupants ===
In 2004, it was intended that the Garden House and Lighthouse would be leased by independent production companies working with the BBC.

The Media Centre was the global headquarters for the BBC's for-profit publishing subsidiary BBC Worldwide from 2008 until 2015, when it moved into the former BBC News annex of Television Centre. Media Centre also housed non-broadcast divisions of the BBC which had been moved from central London to make way for the redevelopment of Broadcasting House. Media Centre was used for broadcasts of Watchdog and Rogue Traders as well as a filming location for The Thick of It.

Some BBC Television-making departments were located in Media Centre following the vacating of Television Centre in 2013 including Comedy, Entertainment & Events and Factual. The BBC then left Media Centre and Garden House, with staff relocated to Broadcast Centre, Broadcasting House, Grafton House and some to MediaCityUK in Salford. Media Centre and Garden House closed on 10 July 2015 following the sale to Stanhope and Mitsui Fudosan. It was stated that the BBC received £87 million for the sale.

At the time of its closure in July 2015, Garden House was mainly occupied by Atos and associated sub-contractors' teams following the sale of BBC Technology to Siemens in 2004.

Broadcast Centre continued to house BBC Design & Engineering staff, BBC Global News, BBC Studios production staff and Marketing and Audiences staff until 2020. The majority of the building is now leased to ITV following the closure of The London Studios.

Red Bee Media broadcasts BBC One, BBC Two, BBC News, Channel 4, Channel 5, BT Sport from Broadcast Centre.

The Energy Centre provides services to the entire site, and between 2008 and 2018 was the offices for the Top Gear television production team and the Top Gear magazine team. They moved into the main BBC Studios offices in Broadcast Centre in 2018. The One Show studio was located in the Energy Centre from 2007 to 2013 before moving to the newly built Peel Wing of Broadcasting House.

In March 2019, BBC Research & Development moved into the Lighthouse building, having vacated Centre House on Wood Lane.

A new building, Gateway Central, was constructed in 2022 and will be the headquarters of L'Oréal.

== White City Place ==
Under new owners Stanhope and Mitsui Fudosan, the site has been renamed White City Place and an extensive refurbishment and refitting of the vacated properties on the site has taken place. The former Media Centre was renamed to The MediaWorks and a significant renovation of White City One, renamed to The WestWorks, changed its main entrance and introduced a row of shops facing the piazza.
