= Beard (surname) =

Beard is an English surname of Anglo-Saxon and Old French origin, first recorded in the Domesday Book.

== Notable people sharing the surname "Beard" ==
- Adrien Beard, American voice actor
- Al Beard, American basketball player
- Alana Beard, American basketball player
- Amanda Beard, American Olympic swimmer
- Andrew Jackson Beard, American inventor
- Annette Beard, American R&B singer, of Martha and the Vandellas
- Anson M. Beard, American football player
- Arthur Beard, British footballer
- Bert Beard, Australian rules footballer
- Bertram Beard, English cricketer
- Butch Beard, American basketball player and coach
- Charles A. Beard, influential American historian
- Chris Beard (born 1957), American electric blues musician
- Clarke Beard, American athlete
- Colin Beard, Australian rules footballer
- Daniel Carter Beard, founder of the Sons of Daniel Boone
- David Beard, Australian volleyball player
- David Breed Beard (1922–1998), American space physicist
- DeLawrence Beard, American judge
- Don Beard, New Zealand cricketer
- Donald Beard, British military aviator
- Dylan Beard (born 1998), American hurdler
- Dympna Beard, Australian politician
- Ed Beard, saloon keeper in the American Old West
- Ed Beard (football player), American football player
- Edward Beard, U.S. congressman from Rhode Island
- Elspeth Beard, English woman motorcyclist
- Emma Beard, British singer
- Frank Beard (golfer), American golfer
- Frank Beard (musician), drummer in the American rock band ZZ Top
- Frederic Beard, English choirmaster in Australia
- George Miller Beard, American neurologist who coined the term "neurasthenia"
- Gordon Beard, Canadian politician
- Graeme Beard, Australian cricketer
- Hannah Beard, English association football player
- Hazel Beard, American politician
- Henry Beard, founder of National Lampoon magazine
- James Beard, American chef and food writer
- James Henry Beard, American painter
- Jim Beard, American jazz pianist
- John Beard (disambiguation), several people

- John Beard (artist) (born 1943), Welsh artist and painter
- John Beard (colonial administrator) (died 1685), Chief Agent and Governor of Bengal
- John Beard (embryologist) (1858–1924), Scottish embryologist and anatomist
- John Beard (news anchor) (born 1945), American newscaster and Arrested Development actor
- John Beard (politician) (1797–1876), American politician
- John Beard (tenor) (c. 1716–1791), English singer of Handel oratorios
- John Beard (trade unionist) (1871–1950), British politician
- John F. Beard (1822–1891), Wisconsin legislator
- John Relly Beard (1800–1876), English Unitarian minister
- John Stanley Beard (1916–2011), British Australian ecologist
- John Stanley Coombe Beard (1890–1970), English architect
- John W. Beard (born 1951), Iowan politician
- John William Beard (1920–2006), Californian politician

- Kevin Beard, American football player
- Malcolm Beard (born 1942), English footballer
- Malcolm Beard (1919–2019), American politician from Florida
- Mark Beard (disambiguation), several people

- Mark Beard (artist) (born 1956), American artist
- Mark Beard (footballer) (born 1974), English football defender
- Mark Beard (racing driver) (1948–2021), American driver and team owner

- Mary Beard (disambiguation), several people

- Mary Beard (classicist) (born 1955), British literary critic and journalist
- Mary Beard (nursing) (1876–1946), director of the American Red Cross Nursing Service
- Mary Ritter Beard (1876–1958), American historian, women's suffrage activist

- Mat Beard (disambiguation), several people (various spellings)

- Mat X. Beard, US state legislator (16th Oklahoma Legislature#House of Representatives)

- Matthew "Stymie" Beard (1925–1981), American child actor in Our Gang

- Matt Beard (1978–2025), English football manager (Burnley F.C. Women, Liverpool F.C. Women)
- Matthew Beard (English actor) (born 1989)

- Nigel Beard, British politician
- Pat Beard, American politician
- Paul Beard (disambiguation), several people

- Paul Beard (spiritualist), British president of the College of Psychic Studies
- Paul Beard (violinist), leader of the London Philharmonic and BBC Symphony orchestras

- Percy Beard, American track and field athlete
- Peter Beard (1938–2020), American photographer and artist
- Peter Beard (politician) (1935–2024), Australian politician
- Peter Beard, mayor of Reading, England
- Peter Hill Beard (1938–2020), American photographer
- Philip Beard, American novelist
- Ralph Beard (1927–2007), American basketball player
- Ralph Beard (baseball) (1929–2003), American Major League Baseball player
- Randal Beard, American engineer
- Richard Beard (disambiguation), several people

- Richard Beard (author) (born 1967), English writer
- Richard Beard (courtier) (fl. 1540), English courtier
- Richard Beard (photographer), English photographer

- Robin Beard, US congressman from Tennessee
- Ronald Beard (born 1951), American football coach
- Santonio Beard (1980–2022), American football player
- Sarah E. Beard (1921–2012), American medical researcher
- Stephanie Beard, Canadian actress
- Tanoka Beard, American basketball player
- Thomas Beard (died 1632), English clergyman and theologian
- Thomas P. Beard (1837–1918), African American politician
- Trevor Beard, British-Australian medical doctor
- William Beard (disambiguation), several people

- William Beard (bone collector) (1772–1868), of Banwell, Somerset
- William Beard (cricketer), New Zealand cricketer
- William E. Beard (1873–1950), American naval historian
- William Holbrook Beard (1824–1900), American painter
- William P. "Bull Moose" Beard, publisher of Abbeville Scimitar
