= William Beard =

William Beard is the name of:

- William Beard (bone collector) (1772–1868), British bone collector, the son of a farmer at Banwell, Somerset
- William Beard (cricketer), New Zealand cricketer
- William E. Beard (1873–1950), American college football player, soldier, journalist and naval historian
- William Holbrook Beard (1824–1900), American painter
- William P. "Bull Moose" Beard, publisher of the short-lived Abbeville Scimitar
