= Thomas Churchyard =

16th century English author and soldier

Thomas Churchyard (c.1523 – 1 April 1604) was an English author and soldier. He is chiefly remembered for a series of autobiographical or semi-autobiographical verse collections, including Churchyardes Chippes (1575); Churchyard's Choise (1579); Churchyardes Charge (1580); The Worthines of Wales (1587); Churchyard's Challenge (1593); and Churchyards Charitie (1595).

== Early life ==
Thomas Churchyard was born at Shrewsbury in c.1523, the son of a farmer. He received a good education, and, having speedily dissipated at court the money with which his father provided him, he entered the household of Henry Howard, Earl of Surrey. There he remained for twenty years, learning something of the art of poetry from his patron; some of the poems he contributed later (1555) to Nicholas Grimald's and Richard Tottel's collection, Songes and Sonettes (known more often as Tottel's Miscellany), may well date from this early period.

== Career ==
In 1541 Churchyard began his career as a soldier of fortune, being, he said, "pressed into the service". He fought his way through nearly every campaign in Scotland and the Low Countries for thirty years. He served under the emperor Charles V in Flanders in 1542, returning to England after the Peace of Crépy (1544).

In the Scottish campaign of 1547 he was present at the barren victory of Pinkie, and in the next year was taken prisoner at Saint Monance, but aided by his persuasive tongue he escaped to the English garrison at Lauder, where he was once more besieged, only returning to England on the conclusion of peace in 1550.

In the same year he went to Ireland to serve the lord deputy of Ireland, Sir Anthony St Leger, who had been sent to pacify the country. Here Churchyard enriched himself, at the expense of the Irish; but in 1552 he was in England again, trying vainly to secure a fortune by marriage with a rich widow. After this failure he departed once more to the wars to the Siege of Metz (1552), and "trailed a pike" in the emperor's army, until he joined the forces under William Grey, 13th Baron Grey de Wilton, with whom he says he served eight years. Grey was in charge of the fortress of Guînes, which was besieged by the duke of Guise in 1558.

Churchyard arranged the terms of surrender, and was sent with his chief to Paris as a prisoner. He was not released at the Peace of Cateau Cambrésis for lack of money to pay his ransom, but he was finally set free on giving his bond for the amount, an engagement which he repudiated as soon as he was safely in England. He is not to be identified with the "T.C." who wrote for the Mirror for Magistrates (ed. 1559), "How the Lord Mowbray ... was banished ... and after died miserablie in exile", which is the work of Thomas Chaloner; but "Shore's Wife", his most popular poem, appeared in the 1563 edition of the same work, and to that of 1587 he contributed the "Tragedie of Thomas Wolsey". These are plain compositions in the seven-lined Chaucerian stanza.

Repeated petitions to the Queen for assistance produced at first fair words, and then no answer at all. He therefore returned to active service under Lord Grey, who was in command of an English army sent in 1560 to help the Scottish rebels at the Siege of Leith, and in 1564 he served in Ireland under Sir Henry Sidney. The religious disturbances in the Netherlands attracted him to Antwerp, where, as the agent of William of Orange, he allowed the insurgents to place him at their head, and was able to save much property from destruction. This action made him so hated by the mob that he had to fly for his life in the disguise of a priest. In the next year he was sent by the earl of Oxford to serve definitely under the prince of Orange. After a year's service he obtained leave to return to England, and after many adventures and narrow escapes in a journey through hostile territory he embarked for Guernsey, and thence for England. His patron, Lord Oxford, disowned him, and the poet, whose health was failing, retired to Bath. He appears to have made a very unhappy marriage at this time, and returned to the Low Countries. Falling into the hands of the Spaniards he was recognized as having had a hand in the Antwerp disturbance, and was under sentence to be executed as a spy when he was saved by the intervention of a noble lady. This experience did not deter him from joining in the defence of Zutphen in 1572, but this was his last campaign, and the troubles of the remaining years of his life were chiefly domestic.

== Later life ==
Churchyard was employed to devise a pageant for the Queen's reception at Bristol in 1574, and again at Norwich in 1578. He had published in 1575 The Firste parte of Churchyarde's Chippes, the modest title which he gives to his works. No second part appeared, but there was a much enlarged edition in 1578. A passage in Churchyarde's Choise (1579) gave offence to Elizabeth, and the author fled to Scotland, where he remained for three years. He was only restored to favour about 1584, and in 1593 he received a small pension from the Queen.

On Good Friday, 8 April 1580, Churchyard (then aged nearly 60) published a short account of the earthquake which had struck London and much of England only two days earlier. The pamphlet, A Warning to the Wyse, a Feare to the Fond, a Bridle to the Lewde, and a Glasse to the Good; written of the late Earthquake chanced in London and other places, 6 April 1580, for the Glory of God and benefit of men, that warely can walk, and wisely judge. Set forth in verse and prose, by Thomas Churchyard, gentleman provides the earliest accounts of the 1580 Dover Straits earthquake.

== Dispute with Thomas Camel ==
In Churchyards Challenge (1593) the author refers to his broadside ballad, Davie Dicars dreame (c. 1551–1552), which he says was written against by one Thomas Camel whom Churchyard then "openly confuted". Their argument came to involve not only Churchyard and Camel but also William Waterman, Geoffrey Chappell, and Richard Beard. All their various contributions were collected and reprinted in The Contention bettwyxte Churchyeard and Camell, upon David Dycers Dreame in 1560. A short and seemingly alliterative poem in the manner of Piers Plowman, Davie Dicar brought Churchyard into trouble with the privy council, but he was supported by Edward Seymour, 1st Duke of Somerset and dismissed with a reprimand.

Carried out in broadside ballads, the Churchyard-Camel debate was concerned with the relative merit of the plain style in native English literary tradition and the proper literary use of the English language itself. In a verse dedication to John Stow's Pithy Pleasaunt and Profitable Workes (1568), Churchyard defended the native tradition, grounding it in "Peers plowman . . . full plaine" and Chaucer. Churchyard mocked Camel's classical, Latinate sophistication, and Camel attacked Churchyard's churlish words and "uncouth speeche". This public controversy resembled the old medieval practice of flyting—a staged, collaborative battle of the wits that was also, in this case, an occasion for the public discussion of moral issues, education, religion, and politics. It was also a means of commercial self-promotion on the part of writers and printers.

Perhaps inspired by Robert Crowley's 1550 publication of Piers Plowman, Davy Dycar (i.e., Davy the ditcher or digger) is a character drawn from a line at the end of Passus 6 in the B-text and the end of Passus 9 in the C-text where it is prophesied that "Dawe the dyker" will die of starvation because of the corruption of landlords and clergy. ("Dawe", written or printed as "Davve", could be read as "Davy" or "Davie".) This is the concluding event in a list of disasters caused by corrupt elites, a part of Piers Plowman that was appreciated by some English Protestants in the mid-sixteenth century. (Notably, the Davy Digger lines were copied into a manuscript of political prophecies compiled around 1553–1554.) Churchyard turns Davy into a Piers-like truth-teller and prophet of a millennial kingdom of justice:

When truth doth tread the strets and liers lurke in den,
And Rex doth raigne and rule the rost, and weedes out wicked men:
Then baleful barnes be blyth that here in England wonne,
Your strife shall stynt I undertake, your dredfull dayes ar done.

William Waterman added to the debate with his Westerne Wyll, calling explicit attention to Davy's roots:

This Diker sems a thryving ladde, brought up in pieres scole
The plowman stoute, of whom I thynke ye have often harde. . . .
And for your lesson, lo by Christ I lyke it well
And such a lyke I wiene, doth pierce the ploughman tell.

== Reputation ==
The affectionate esteem with which Churchyard was regarded by the younger Elizabethan writers is expressed by Thomas Nashe, who says (Foure Letters Confuted) that Churchyard's aged muse might well be "grandmother to our grandiloquentest poets at this present". Francis Meres (Palladis Tamia, 1598) mentions him in conjunction with many great names among "the most passionate, among us, to bewail and bemoan the perplexities of love". Spenser, in "Colin Clout's Come Home Again", calls him with a spice of raillery "old Palaemon" who "sung so long until quite hoarse he grew".

His writings, with the exception of his contributions to the Mirror for Magistrates, are chiefly autobiographical in character or deal with the wars in which he had a share. They are very rare and have never been completely reprinted. Churchyard lived right through Elizabeth's reign, and was buried in St Margaret's, Westminster, on 4 April 1604. It was said he was taken ill in the presence of Anne of Denmark's ladies in waiting and carried away in a faint a fortnight before his death.

== Works ==
The extant works of Churchyard, exclusive of commendatory and occasional verses, include:

- A lamentable and pitifull Description of the wofull warres in Flanders (1578)
- A Prayse, and Reporte of Maister MartyneFrobishers Voyage to Meta Incognita (A Name Given by a Mightie and most Great Personage) in Which Praise and Report is Written Divers Discourses Never Published by any Man as Yet (1578)
- A general rehearsall of warres, called Churchyard's Choise (1579), really a completion of the Chippes, and containing, like it, a number of detached pieces
- A light Bondel of livelie Discourses, called Churchyardes Charge (1580)
- A Warning to the Wyse, an immediate account of England's 1580 earthquake (1580)
- The Worthines of Wales (1587), a valuable antiquarian work in prose and verse, anticipating Michael Drayton
- Churchyard's Challenge (1593)
- A Musicall Consort of Heavenly harmonic, called Churchyards Charitie (1595)
- A True Discourse Historicall, of the succeeding Governors in the Netherlands (1602)

== See also ==
- Piers Plowman Tradition

== Sources ==
The chief contemporary authority for Churchyard's biography is his own "Tragicall Discourse of the unhappy man's life" (Churchyardes Chippes). George Chalmers published (1817) a selection from his works relating to Scotland, for which he wrote a useful life. See also an edition of the Chippes (ed. JP Collier, 1870), of the Worthines of Wales (Spenser Soc., 1876), and a notice of Churchyard by H. W. Adnitt (Transactions of the Shropshire Archaeological and Natural History Society, reprinted separately 1884).

- Churchyard, Thomas (1817). Churchyard's Chips concerning Scotland. London: Constable.
- Lyne, Raphael (2006) [2004]. "Churchyard, Thomas (1523?–1604)". Oxford Dictionary of National Biography (online ed.). Oxford University Press. doi:10.1093/ref:odnb/5407. (Subscription, Wikipedia Library access or UK public library membership required.)
- Oakley-Brown, Liz (2008). "Taxonomies of travel and martial identity in Thomas Churchyard's A Generall Rehearsall of Warres and A Pirates Tragedie (1579)". Studies in Travel Writing. 12 (1): 67–84. doi:10.3197/136451408X273844. S2CID 162298056.
- Oakley-Brown, Liz (2011). "Elizabethan exile after Ovid: Thomas Churchyard's Tristia (1572)". In Ingleheart, Jennifer (ed.). Two Thousand Years of Solitude. Oxford: Oxford University Press. pp. 103–118. ISBN 978-0-19-161913-7.
- Oakley-Brown, Liz (2012). "Thomas Churchyard". In Sullivan, Garrett A. Jr; Stewart, Alan (eds.). The Encyclopedia of English Renaissance Literature. Chichester: Wiley Blackwell. ISBN 978-1405194495.
- Oakley-Brown, Liz (2012). "Writing on Borderlines: Thomas Churchyard's The Worthines of Wales". In Mottram, Stewart; Prescott, Sarah (eds.). Writing Wales, from the Renaissance to Romanticism. Aldershot: Ashgate. pp. 39–57. ISBN 9781409445098.
- Ward, Bernard M. (1928). The Seventeenth Earl of Oxford, 1550–1604: from contemporary documents. London: John Murray. pp. 29–30.
- Woodcock, Matthew (2016). Thomas Churchyard: pen, sword, and ego. Oxford: Oxford University Press. ISBN 9780199684304.
