= John Beard =

John Beard may refer to:

- John Beard (artist) (born 1943), Welsh artist and painter
- John Beard (colonial administrator) (died 1685), Chief Agent and Governor of Bengal
- John Beard (embryologist) (1858–1924), Scottish embryologist and anatomist
- John Beard (news anchor) (born 1948), American newscaster and Arrested Development actor
  - John Beard (Arrested Development), the character he plays
- John Beard (politician) (1797–1876), American politician
- John Beard (tenor) (c. 1716–1791), English singer of Handel's operas and oratorios
- John Beard (trade unionist) (1871–1950), British trade unionist and politician
- John F. Beard (1822–1891), Wisconsin legislator
- John Relly Beard (1800–1876), Unitarian minister
- John Stanley Beard (1916–2011), British-born Australian forester and ecologist
- John Stanley Coombe Beard (1890–1970), English architect
- John W. Beard (born 1951), Iowan politician
- John William Beard (1920–2006), member of the California legislature
