= Bréard =

Bréard is a French surname. Notable people with the surname include:

- Andrea Bréard, German historian of mathematics
- Jean-Jacques Bréard (1751–1840), French politician
- Lucie Bréard (1902–1988), French runner

== See also ==
- Beard (surname)
