= Mary Beard (disambiguation) =

Mary Beard may refer to:

- Mary Beard (classicist) (born 1955), British classicist, literary critic and journalist
- Mary Beard (nursing) (1876–1946), director of the American Red Cross Nursing Service
- Mary Ritter Beard (1876–1958), American historian, author, women's suffrage activist
