= Lynching of Anthony Crawford =

African American who was lynched in the U.S.

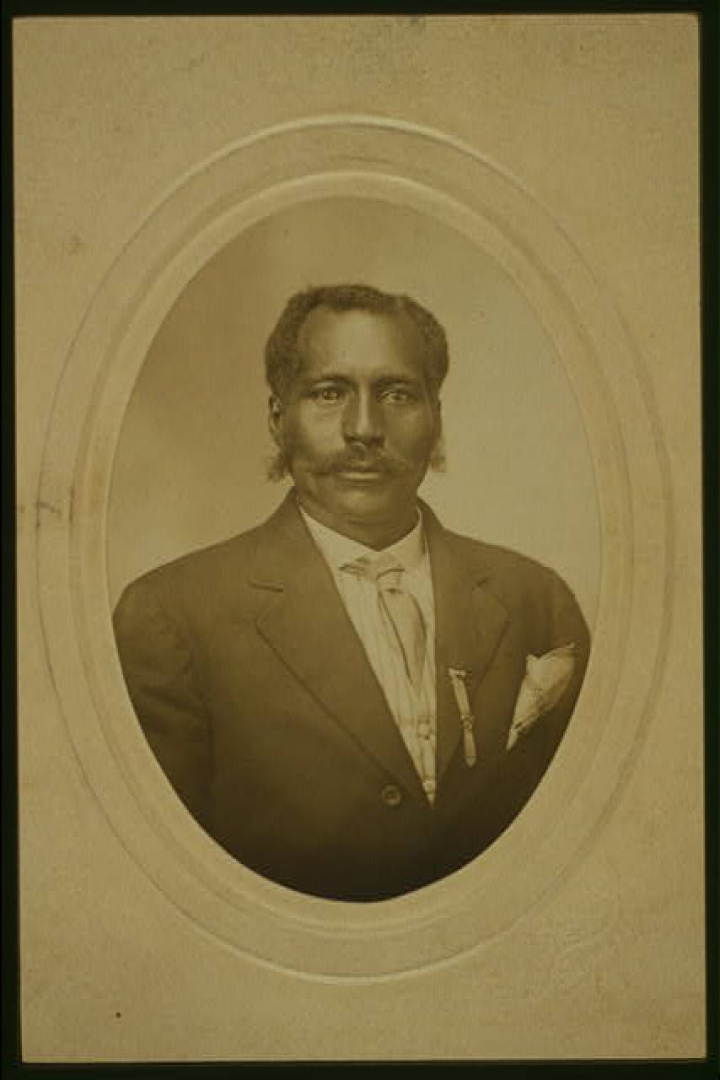
Anthony Crawford in 1910, six years before his death at the hands of a lynch mob.

Anthony Crawford (ca. 1865 – October 21, 1916) was a highly successful African American landowner, around the turn of the 20th century. He was murdered by a lynch mob in Abbeville, South Carolina on October 21, 1916. It was a crime that went unpunished.

== Life ==
Crawford was born early in the Reconstruction Era, c. 1865. After the American Civil War, Crawford's father became the owner of a modest acreage of cotton fields on the Little River, about seven miles west of Abbeville, which he worked with his son. Anthony was an ambitious and literate child who routinely walked seven miles to the school in Abbeville. Crawford inherited the land on his father's death, which he increased by substantial land purchases in 1883, 1888, 1899 and 1903. In the mid or late 1890s, Crawford was co-founder of the Industrial Union of Abbeville County, which was devoted to the "material, moral and intellectual advance of the colored people". He was the father of twelve sons and four daughters.

By 1916, his land holdings had expanded to 427 acres (as much as 600, according to some sources). Many of Crawford's children had settled on plots adjoining that of their father. With a net worth of approximately $20,000 to $25,000 in 1916 dollars, Crawford was without doubt one of the richest men in Abbeville County.

Crawford was also known for his refusal to tolerate disrespect or defiance in any form. Once, when his church's preacher delivered a sermon decrying Crawford's meddling in church affairs, Crawford jumped out of his seat, struck the man and fired him on the spot. This extended even to whites: "The day a white man hits me is the day I die", he was quoted as having said to his children. After his death New York investigative reporter Roy Nash interviewed many of Abbeville's most prominent citizens such as Dr. Harrison president of Farmers' Bank. Harrison commented that Crawford was insolent to whites and got what he deserved. Although Harrison wanted the law upheld, he did not want "a white man's right to whip a negro once in a while interfered with."

== Lynching ==
On October 21, 1916, Crawford was taking two loads of cotton and a load of seed into Abbeville and had a disagreement over the price of cottonseed with W. D. Barksdale, a white store owner. After Crawford left the store, one of Barksdale's employees followed him outside and hit him on the head with an ax handle. Crawford called for help, which drew the attention of Sheriff R.M. Burts. The officer arrested Crawford as a mob of angry whites was already beginning to accumulate.

Crawford was held at the jail briefly, and released later that day on $15 bail. While Crawford was arranging bail, Barksdale was organizing a mob with McKinney Cann to whip Crawford and "cure him, if possible". Sheriff Burts allowed Crawford to exit from a side door, but the mob saw him anyway and pursued him into a cotton mill nearby, where Crawford took shelter in the boiler room. McKinny Cann entered the boiler room after Crawford, and Crawford, grabbing a hammer from some nearby tools, knocked the man unconscious. Although the mill workers attempted to stop it, Crawford was stabbed and severely beaten by the mob. Sheriff R.M. Burts appeared and arrested Crawford once more, much to the chagrin of the mob of whites. The sheriff could only get Crawford away from the mob by promising to the brothers of Cann that he would not try to sneak Crawford out of town before the full extent of McKinny Cann's injuries was known. As it happened, Cann was not badly hurt, although Crawford was. He was treated by physician C.C. Gamble, who also happened to be the mayor of Abbeville. Gamble announced that Crawford would likely die from his wounds.

Considering that Crawford might die before the mob could get to him, and concerned that the sheriff might spirit him out of town at 3 p.m., around 200 white men besieged the jail, captured and disarmed Sheriff Burts, and abducted Crawford.

Crawford was dragged down three flights of stairs amongst a cheering, bloodthirsty mob, where they proceeded to beat him with rocks, wagon boards, jump and spit on him. The mob then dragged him through the black section of town with a rope around his neck as a warning. The mob then stole a lumber wagon from a black driver and used it to take Crawford to a fairground nearby. Crawford, likely dead by that point, was still hanged from a tree, and armed whites riddled his body with bullets, rendering it to a "bloody pulp" by the "bloodthirsty" white mob that resented his wealth. The paper's headline the next day read "Negro Strung Up and Shot to Pieces". After dark, the county coroner, F.W.R. Nance, assembled a jury which he knew included two members of the lynch mob, one being his grandson, to the fairground to cut down Crawford's mutilated remains. Nance reported his finding as Crawford had died "at the hands of parties unknown".

That night, the relentless mob decided they needed to drive Crawford's children and their families from the area. A consortium of white businessmen, Jack Perrin, J. Allen Smith and J. S. Stark, worrying about the economic effect of such a decision, opposed these decisions and was able to convince the mob arrange a meeting the following Monday to decide what to do with the Crawford family.

On October 23, 1916, the white citizens of Abbeville, including many members of the lynch mob, voted to expel the remainder of Crawford's family from South Carolina, and to seize their considerable property holdings. They also voted to close down all the black-owned businesses in Abbeville. The Crawfords requested they be given until November 15 and this was granted; they were to leave by mid-November. They did indeed leave, leaving behind their family's generational assets.

== Aftermath ==
South Carolina governor Richard Irvine Manning III was quick to denounce the murder. He ordered a full investigation of the crime by both Sheriff Burts and State Solicitor Robert Archer Cooper, exhorting them to hand down indictments of the mob participants. Many Abbeville residents were held and questioned and resulted in several men being charged J. V. Elgin, Sam Adams, Eugene Nance, B. Grant, Sam Eakin, R. Bert Ferguson, Sing Findley, George White Jr, J. A. Brock, W. D. Bell, M. R. Casey, Will Cann, Jeff Cann, Sam Cann, Lester Cann, Jim Dawson, John T. Cheatham, Irwin Ferguson and J. S. Banks.

While out on bail and awaiting trial, an article purportedly written by members of the lynch mob themselves was published in the Abbeville Scimitar:

We are ALL responsible for the conditions that caused Crawford's death. Those involved might have gone too far, but they are white men and Crawford was black. The black must submit to the white or the white will destroy. There were several hundred who participated in this lynching, and nearly ALL the others were well-wishers, therefore to pick out a few to satisfy a newly imported mawkish sentiment, is pitiful and cowardly. Men of Abbeville, the eyes of all white men are upon you. Acquit yourselves as white men. The conditions made by US ALL, make us all responsible, so let's not ask only eight to shoulder the whole burden. Answer a mawkish sentiment generated by hypocrisy and craven fear with the ringing verdict, Not guilty.

Whether or not this document was genuine is open to question. The publisher of the Scimitar, William P. "Bull Moose" Beard, was a white supremacist. Beard and his editorials in the Scimitar openly ridiculed Governor Manning's attempts to bring any members of the mob to trial, writing that Crawford's murder was "inevitable and racially justifiable". Other newspapers in the area took a different tone, like the Press and Banner, which pointed out that by driving away cheap African American labor, the lynch mobs were bankrupting South Carolina farmers. These two facets of the debate were indicative of a growing schism in the South: middle- and upper-class whites were beginning to disapprove of lynchings, and the belief that lynch mobs were an "expansive luxury" the South could no longer afford was beginning to take root.

The preliminary trial hearing began on December 5, 1916, with Sheriff Burts being the first witness and identifying some of the defendants as being connected. Even with the sheriff's testimony, the murder occurring in broad daylight, over a period of hours, with hundreds of witnesses, on February 28, 1917, the grand jury failed to find any of the white mob guilty of lynching or rioting and were released.

On November 16, 1928, Crawford's 427 acres on Little River valued at approximately $20,000 was auctioned and was purchased by Col. T. G. White for $610.

== Secondary motivation ==
In addition to the racist motivations of those who wished to uphold the white status quo over an African American man who maintained a defiantly confident and aggressive posture in the presence of whites, and the generally poor tenor of race relations in Abbeville in general, historians have also speculated that the mob was partially motivated by a desire to humiliate and discredit Abbeville Sheriff R.M. Burts, and, by extension, Governor Manning, by local white politicians. Burts came from a wealthy family, and he had been unexpectedly appointed to his post by the comparatively enlightened and genteel Manning, despite Burts' lack of law enforcement qualifications. Many local white politicians were angered by this, and thought the job should have gone to Police Chief Joe Johnson. Coming up for election, Burts later defeated candidates Jess Cann (brother to McKinny Cann) and George White, two men who would play instrumental roles in the actions of the lynch mob.

In the primary of South Carolina's gubernatorial election in July 1916, three months before Crawford's lynching, Manning had debated former governor (and future senator) of South Carolina Coleman Livingston Blease in Abbeville. Blease was known for his racist rhetoric, and he hurled invective at Manning's progressive approach toward race relations, claiming that this attitude had specifically incited a number of assaults by black men against white men and women. In the primary, Blease overwhelmingly took Abbeville County, but Manning narrowly won the state in a runoff election. An acolyte of Blease's, a young lawyer named Sam Adams, also made an unsuccessful run at state legislature. Perhaps to increase his local political fortunes, he bragged of his participation in the mob, and even that it was he who had placed the rope around Crawford's neck. Adams even specifically asked William Beard to print in his paper (the Scimitar) that Adams had been the ringleader of the group.

== Senate resolution ==
In 2005, the 109th Congress of the United States Senate passed Resolution 39, which was a formal apology to African Americans for Congress's failure to pass any kind of anti-lynching legislation despite over 200 anti-lynching bills having been introduced to Congress. The resolution was issued before the descendants of Anthony Crawford, among other surviving descendants of lynching victims, and marked the first occasion that Congress had apologized to African Americans for any reason, whereas Congress had in the past apologized to other ethnic groups, such as Japanese-Americans, for the actions of the United States.
