= Paul Beard =

Paul Beard may refer to:

- Paul Beard (spiritualist) (1904–2002), author and president of the College of Psychic Studies, London
- Paul Beard (violinist) (1901–1989), leader of the London Philharmonic and BBC Symphony Orchestras
- Paul Beard (animator) (1978–2005), animator for Blue's Clues, Blue's Room, and Wonder Pets!
- Paul Beard, inventor of the spread spectrum, see Spektrum RC
