= Mark Beard =

Mark Beard may refer to:

- Mark Beard (artist) (born 1956), American artist
- Mark Beard (footballer) (born 1974), former English football defender
- Mark Beard (racing driver) (1948–2021), American race car driver and team owner
