= Richard Beard =

Richard Beard may refer to:

- Richard Beard (photographer) (1801–1885), English entrepreneur and photographer
- Richard Beard (courtier) (fl. 1540), English courtier
- Richard Beard (author) (born 1967), English writer
