= William H. Armstrong (Wisconsin politician) =

19th century American politician

Member of the Wisconsin State Assembly from the Lafayette district
- In office January 6, 1873 – January 5, 1874
- Preceded by: Thomas Bainbridge
- Succeeded by: John F. Beard

Wisconsin Circuit Court Clerk for Lafayette County, Wisconsin
- In office January 1, 1869 – January 1, 1873
- Preceded by: David W. Kyle
- Succeeded by: R. H. Williams

Personal details
- Born: May 1840/1841 Carrollton, Illinois, U.S.
- Died: April 14, 1916 (aged 75) Luverne, Minnesota, U.S.
- Resting place: Maplewood Cemetery, Luverne, Minnesota
- Party: Republican
- Spouse: Harriet M. Gray (m. 1874–1916)
- Children: William Wright Armstrong^{(b. 1865; died 1932)}; Frederic Ernest Armstrong^{(b. 1874; died 1964)}; Anna M. (James)^{(b. 1881; died 1963)}; James H. Armstrong^{(b. 1884; died 1972)}

Military service
- Allegiance: United States
- Branch/service: United States Volunteers; Union Army
- Rank: Captain, USV
- Unit: 61st Reg. Ill. Vol. Infantry
- Battles/wars: American Civil War

William Henry Armstrong (May 1840/1841 – April 14, 1916) was an American lawyer, farmer, and Republican politician. He was a member of the Wisconsin State Assembly, representing Lafayette County during the 1873 session.

== Background ==
Armstrong was born in Carrollton, Illinois, in 1840 or 1841 (sources differ), son of Joshua W. and Elizabeth Vanarsdoll Armstrong. He attended public schools until he left to enter military service. He joined the United States Army in September 1861 after the outbreak of the American Civil War, enlisting in the 61st Illinois Volunteer Infantry Regiment. He progressed from second lieutenant through captain and was brevetted as a major. He came to Wisconsin in 1865 and settled at Darlington, becoming by occupation a lawyer and farmer.

== Public office ==
He was elected as Wisconsin circuit court clerk for Lafayette County, Wisconsin, in 1868 and re-elected in 1870.

In 1872 he was elected for a one-year term as a member of the Wisconsin State Assembly in 1873 as a Republican, with 2,078 votes to 1,972 for Democrat Amos W. Hovey, succeeding fellow Republican Thomas Bainbridge. He was assigned to the standing committee on mining and smelting.

Armstrong was not a candidate for re-election in 1873, and was succeeded by John F. Beard of the Reform Party.

== Family and later life ==
Armstrong married first Georgia Wright, who died in 1869. Their child, William Wright Armstrong, would serve as a member of the Utah State Senate. He later married Harriet M. Gray, with whom he had three further children between 1874 and 1884. At some point after leaving the Assembly, the family moved to Kansas, living first in Irving and later in Marysville.

Armstrong died April 14, 1916, in Rock County, Minnesota, and is buried in Maplewood Cemetery in Luverne, Minnesota.

Wisconsin State Assembly
Preceded by Thomas Bainbridge	Member of the Wisconsin State Assembly from the Lafayette district January 6, 1873 – January 5, 1874	Succeeded by John F. Beard
Legal offices
Preceded by David W. Kyle	Wisconsin Circuit Court Clerk for Lafayette County, Wisconsin; January 1, 1869 – January 1, 1873	Succeeded by R. H. Williams
