= Trevor Beard =

British-born Australian medical doctor (1920-2010)

Trevor Beard OBE
- Born: Trevor Cory Beard; 11 May 1920; Gloucester, England, United Kingdom
- Died: 2 September 2010 (aged 90); Hobart, Tasmania, Australia
- Citizenship: Australian
- Education: University of Cambridge; University of California, Berkeley
- Occupation: General practitioner
- Known for: Echinococcosis eradication
- Medical career
- Profession: Medical doctor
- Institutions: Menzies Centre for Population Health Research
- Awards: Officer of the Order of the British Empire (1966)

Trevor Cory Beard, OBE (11 May 1920 – 2 September 2010) was a British-born Australian medical doctor, best known for his work in the 1960s to eradicate echinococcosis (or hydatid disease) in Tasmania. In later life, Beard was known as an anti-salt campaigner.

Born in Gloucester, England, Beard studied medicine and surgery at Cambridge, and a Master of Public Health at University of California, Berkeley where he was elected to the Zeta chapter of Delta Omega, the honorary society for graduate studies in public health. He also received a DObst RCOG from the Royal College of Obstetricians and Gynaecologists in London. Following qualification, he was a resident at St Bartholomew's Hospital, and later the City of London Maternity Hospital. He then enlisted in the British Army, attaining the rank of Captain in the Royal Army Medical Corps.

Beard emigrated to Australia in the 1950s, where he worked as a general practitioner. At his practice in Campbell Town, Tasmania, he began to notice a large number of adult and paediatric cases of echinococcosis—cysts caused by the larval phase of the Echinococcus tapeworm, usually transmitted to humans by dogs. When a young boy in the town died from a ruptured hydatid cyst, Beard persuaded the rural community to start a prevention and eradication campaign. Following a fact-finding trip to New Zealand where a campaign to eradicate Echinococcosis was already underway, Beard formed the Tasmanian Hydatids Eradication Council and worked with the Tasmanian government to establish and implement a formal prevention, testing and eradication program. In February 1996, Tasmania was declared provisionally free of hydatids in humans, dogs and livestock—the first territory in the world to do so.

In 1979, concerned about his own high blood pressure, Beard read a medical journal editorial entitled "Hypertension – salt poisoning?", which sparked his special interest in salt intake as a public health issue. Beard continued to campaign for reduction or elimination of salt from the diet in his active retirement role as a senior research fellow at the University of Tasmania's Menzies Centre for Population Health Research. He authored the book Salt Matters: the Killer Condiment, published by Hachette Australia.

Beard died on 2 September 2010, aged 90.

== Awards and honours ==
In the Queen's Birthday Honours of 1966, Beard was made an Officer of the Order of the British Empire (OBE) for services to public health, in particular his role as Secretary of the Tasmanian Hydatids Eradication Council.

In 2006, he was made Senior Australian of the Year for Tasmania.
