= James Henry Beard =

American painter (1812–1893)

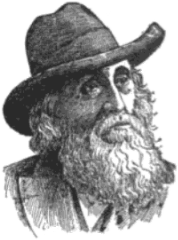
- Born: April 22, 1812; Buffalo, New York
- Died: October 20, 1893 (aged 81); Flushing, Queens, New York
- Education: Self-taught
- Known for: Painter
- Movement: Portrait painting

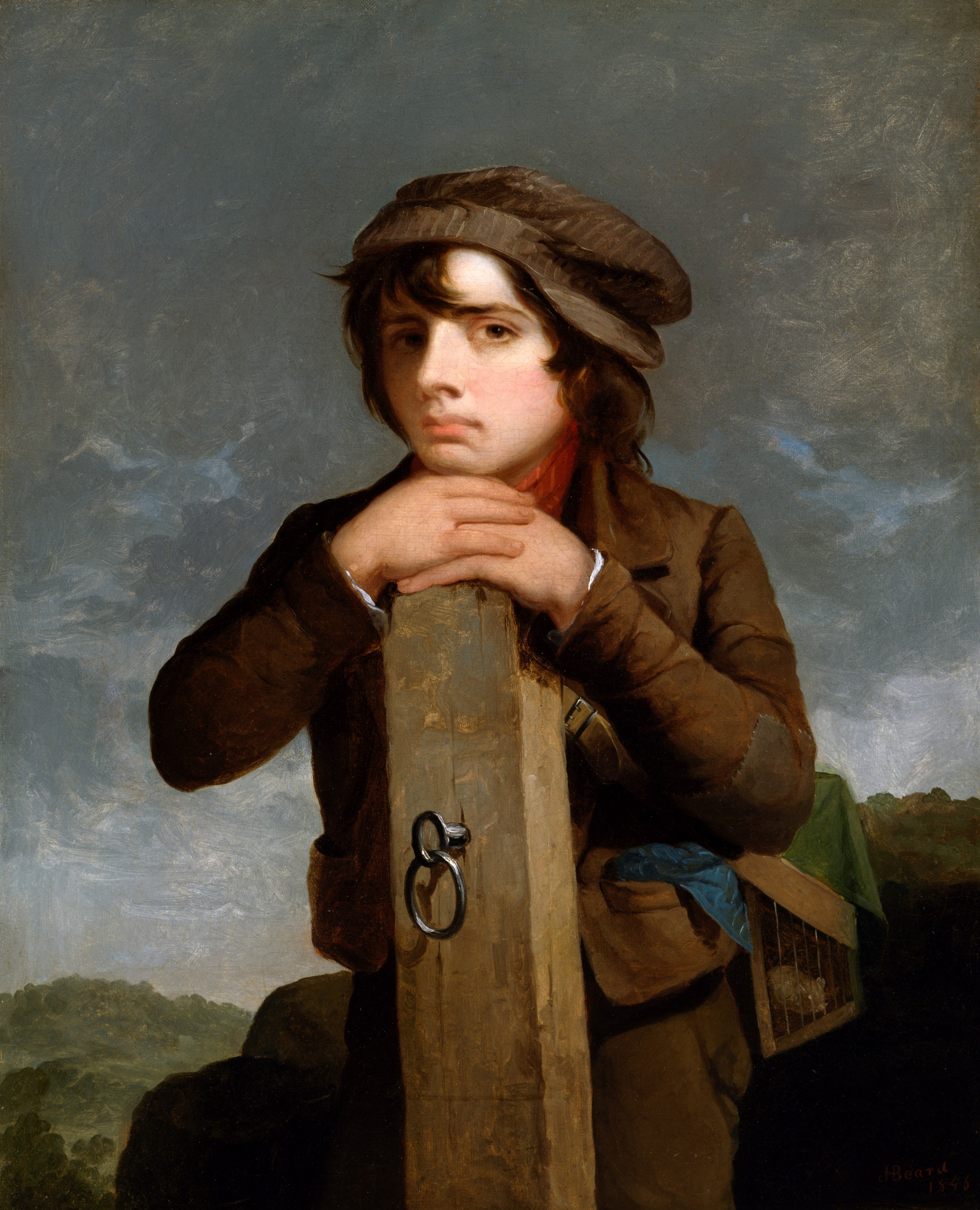
The Young Itinerant (1846)

James Henry Beard (April 22, 1812 – October 20, 1893) was an American portrait painter. He was elected as a member of the National Academy of Design in 1872.

== Early life ==
Beard was born in Buffalo, New York on April 22, 1812 and later died in Flushing, Queens, New York in 1893. The son of English and Scottish immigrants, Beard's artistic interest and recognition of his capability took no time to blossom. It was after the Beard family's relocation to Ohio that he began the serious pursuit of honing his artistic capabilities.

== Ohio ==
Beard began with a variety of techniques such as watercolor and pastel. It was in Painesville, Ohio that Beard studied under Jarvis Frary Hanks. His preferred genre of art was portrait painting; Henry Clay, John Quincy Adams, and Don Quixote are just a few of the figures he chose to depict.

== New York ==
In 1846, at the age of 32, Beard returned to New York in order to get his work noticed. Two years later, his work paid off, as he was inducted into the National Academy of Design. In 1870 he decided to make New York his permanent home. It was in New York City that he began his series of representations of dogs and cats that he is known for.

== Artwork ==
The Illustrious Guest (1847)

- Westward Ho (1850)
- Peep at growing danger (1871)
- The Widow (1872)
- Mutual Friend (1875)
- Parson's Pets (1875)
- Attorney and Clients (1876)
- Out All Night (1876)
- There's Many a Slip (1876)
- Consultation (1877)
- Don Quixote (1878)
- Sancho Panza (1878)
- It is very Queer, isn't it (1885)

== See also ==
- William Holbrook Beard, his brother
