= Randal Beard =

American electrical engineer

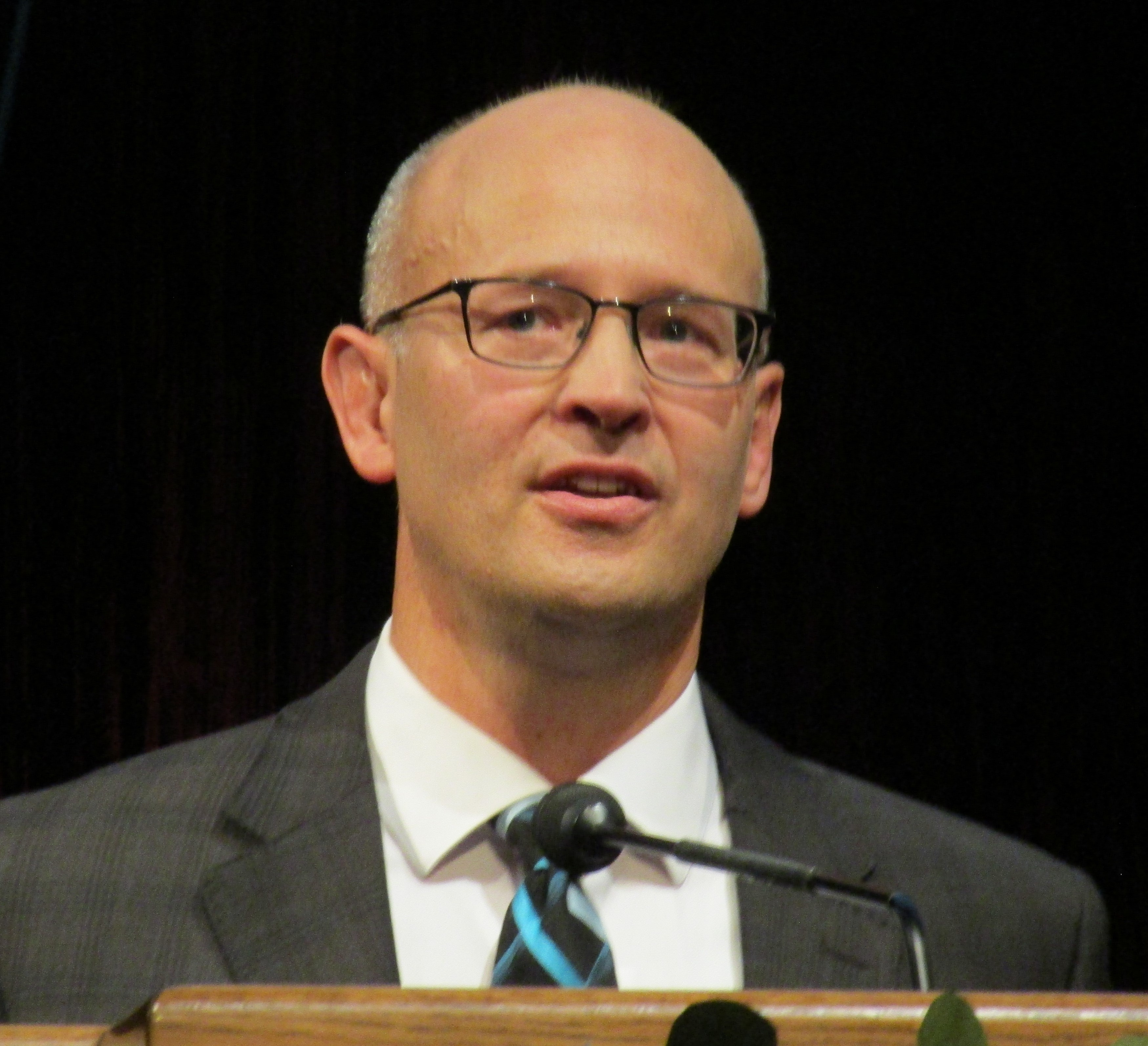
Randal Beard in 2018

Randal W. Beard from the Brigham Young University, Provo, UT was named Fellow of the Institute of Electrical and Electronics Engineers (IEEE) in 2015 for contributions to the theory and practice of guidance, control, and team coordination of unmanned aerial vehicles.
