= Arthur Beard =

English footballer

Personal information
- Place of birth: England
- Position: Winger

Senior career*
Years	Team	Apps	(Gls)
1904	Burnley	1	(0)
- * Club domestic league appearances and goals

Arthur Beard was an English footballer who played as a winger. He played in the Football League Second Division for Burnley in 1904. His single competitive appearance for the club came on 10 September 1904, when he played right wing in the 0–4 defeat to Bolton Wanderers.
