= Bertram Beard =

English cricketer

Personal information
- Full name: Bertram Ferryman Beard
- Born: 1 December 1874; Rottingdean, Sussex, England
- Died: 2 December 1959 (aged 85); Westminster, London, England
- Batting: Right-handed
- Bowling: Right-arm medium

Domestic team information
- Years: Team
- 1899: Sussex

Career statistics
Competition	First-class
Matches	2
Runs scored	4
Batting average	2.00
100s/50s	–/–
Top score	4
Balls bowled	10
Wickets	–
Bowling average	–
5 wickets in innings	–
10 wickets in match	–
Best bowling	–
Catches/stumpings	1/–
- Source: Cricinfo, 11 February 2012

Bertram Ferryman Beard (1 November 1874 – 2 December 1959) was an English cricketer. Beard was a right-handed batsman who bowled right-arm medium pace.

== Biography ==
Bertram Beard was born in Rottingdean, Sussex, and was educated at Wellington College.

He made two first-class appearances for Sussex in the 1899 County Championship against Essex and Lancashire, both at the County Ground, Hove. Against Essex, Beard was dismissed for 4 runs in Sussex's first-innings by Sailor Young, while in their second-innings he wasn't required to bat, with the match ending in a draw. Against Lancashire, Beard was dismissed for a duck in Sussex's first-innings by Willis Cuttell. He didn't bat again in the match, as Sussex won by an innings and 2 runs.

He was commissioned as a 2nd Lieutenant in the Royal Garrison Artillery during World War I. Beard was recorded as living at the upmarket Onslow Gardens in Kensington, London in 1936. He died at Westminster, London, on 2 December 1959.
