= DeLawrence Beard =

American judge

DeLawrence Beard is a former Chief Judge for the Sixth Judicial Circuit Court in Montgomery County, Maryland, the highest common law and equity court of record exercising original jurisdiction. He retired on December 26, 2007.

== Biography ==
Beard was born in Okalona, Arkansas, on December 26, 1937.

After receiving an Honorable Discharge from the United States Navy in 1959, he earned a B.A. in political science from the University of Missouri in 1964.

After attending the University of Baltimore School of Law from 1967 to 1970, earning a J.D., he graduated from the Georgetown University Law Center with an LL.M in 1977.

Beard and his wife Lillian, a pediatrician and author, live in Potomac, Maryland.

== Controversy ==
Beard had approved a petition by a gay man to adopt his same-sex partner of 32 years in order to establish a legal family relationship, mainly for purposes of inheritance and being able to make legally enforceable decisions about each other's medical care. The attorney for the two men, who wished to remain anonymous, stated that they were a middle-aged couple, and that the younger man had adopted the older one, whose parents are deceased and thus could not object.

The order approving the adoption requires that a new birth certificate be issued to the older man, listing the younger man as his parent.

== See also ==
- Government of Maryland#Circuit Courts
- List of African-American jurists
