= John Beard (embryologist) =

Scottish embryologist (1858–1924)

- Born: 11 November 1858; Heaton Norris, England
- Died: 24 November 1924 (aged 66)
- Occupations: Embryologist, writer

John Beard (11 November 1858 – 24 November 1924) was a Scottish embryologist, known for his controversial theory of the trophoblastic origin of cancer and his experimental treatments of cancer by means of pancreatic enzymes.

== Early life and education ==
Beard was born on 11 November 1858 in Heaton Norris, a "southern suburb of industrial Manchester, UK." Beard hailed from a family of mill workers; His grandfather was an unskilled laborer while his father rose to the position of mill clerk. Although uneducated, his father did well enough to rent a home in Reddish Lane, a white collar neighborhood with a live-in servant. The family's fortunes took a turn for the worse in 1866 when his father died at 31 years old. Although his mother (Eliza) still had some means, the family moved to a blue-collar neighborhood to adjust to the increased financial hardship. These issues proved temporary, however, when Eliza married a cotton manufacturer which moved the family to Littleborough, Rochdale. This family move was the first that directly influenced Beard's educational background. John and his younger brother, Samuel, were enrolled in the prestigious King's School. John left the King's School after two years, ultimately leaving to finish his secondary education near home. This departure was likely not due to financial reasons but rather due to Beard's burgeoning interest in biology (A newer field less popular at King's School).

In 1877 Beard registered at Owens College in Manchester. Owens, at the time a newer institution, was known for an emphasis on subjects such as evolutionary biology. Beard pursued and excelled in this field, studying under the tutelage of Arthur Milnes Marshall. Although he eventually received both a (BSc) and an honorary doctorate from Owens, Beard first obtained his (BSc) from Royal College of Science, London in 1878. The next few years would be tumultuous for Beard. His mother died, he enrolled and later dropped out of medical school in 1880, and ultimately was mentored by famed professor Thomas Henry Huxley (Charles Darwin's student) from 1880 to 1881 at the Royal School of Mines (RSM), South Kensington, London. After a year studying chemistry back at Owen's College, Beard went to Germany and received his doctorate from the Ludwigs University of Freiberg in 1884, specializing in zoology. His thesis was titled "On the Life-History and Development of the Genus Myzostoma". This stop involved visiting studies at institutions in Germany and Italy; Beard also married Henriette Marie Sester during his time in Germany.

== Research career ==
Beard and his family moved back to England in 1884 and took a postdoctoral opportunity at Owens College. Due to his previous history at the school, he ultimately earned a (BSc) from the institution. Beard's initial research interests involved the "evolutionary development of sensory organs in fish". Finishing his postdoctoral opportunity in 1889, Beard went back to Germany and became the personal assistant of Friedrich Leopold August Weismann, a professor of enormous stature. Between April and June 1889, Beard visited Black Lake in upper New York State. Black Lake, described as "nature's fish hatchery", was a perfect place for Beard to study Lepidosteus osseus (American bill fish). By his departure from the lake, Beard had collected an extensive amount of material that would help develop his notable trophoblastic theory. Upon studying microscope slides of early-stage Lepidosteus, Beard discovered "sensory neurons located within the dorsal zone of the spinal cord, which were assembled and subsequently disassembled in the course of the fish's early development. This transient nervous system persisted until it was replaced by the development of the dorsal root ganglia". In other words, Lepidosteus "produced two nervous systems in consecutive order, the first of which group outside the normal embryonic development of the latter". This was Beard's first exposure to breaks from traditional evolutionary theory, which thought progression occurred gradually only in a linear fashion. Likewise, the counterintuitive finding regarding Lepidosteus embryology helped Beard think against the grain of the dogma of the day. These cells, later named Rohan-Beard cells, and their curious patterns (development and disappearance) became one of the first known descriptions of apoptosis. Beard published his findings in "Lepidosteus", and even mused about alternating generations in animals in a manner similar to those found in plants.

Beard's career took a turn in the following years. In 1889, he was appointed naturalist in charge of the Marine Laboratory at Dunbar, working for the Scottish Fishery Board. This ultimately led to an 1890 appointment as a faculty member of the University of Edinburgh, the senior assistant to James Cossar Ewart, MD (Regius professor of natural history). Beard served as a lecturer in comparative embryology, anatomy of vertebrates, and cytology. Despite a relative lack of compensation and status due to England's comparative lack of enthusiasm in embryology to Germany, Beard had a prolific stretch from 1885 to 1905. During this time, he published about 100 scientific articles along with 5 monographs. Regarding a wide variety of topics, journals Beard published in include (but are not limited to) the following: "Nature, Science, British Medical Journal, The Lancet, and Anatomischer Anzeiger". Towards the end of this period, Beard's interests began to veer toward Human Biology; specifically, he sought to apply the unusual findings he observed in fish embryology to human development.

Beard's first venture in human development was an insightful publication on the role of the corpus luteum. Drawing from his previous experiences with Lepidosteus, Beard suggested that the corpus luteum likely formed to aid pregnancy and the environment needed for a growing fetus. His speculation was further confirmed shortly thereafter and showed the parallels between the temporary developments in fish and mammals. Beard spent the next few years focusing on the "rhythm of reproduction in mammals"; Specifically, Beard pushed his focus onto germ cells. Drawing from his experience in Black Lake, Beard sought to closely explore the role of germ cells during the various stages of embryonic development. This study would ultimately lead to the development of the trophoblastic theory Beard is best known for.

== Trophoblastic theory of cancer ==
Before the work of Beard, the use of enzymes to treat cancer had almost never been proposed; an exception is an advocation for using papaya enzymes by indigenous populations, an argument not scientifically developed. Beard, on the other hand, ultimately recommended the use of pancreatic enzymes to treat cancer from his extensive knowledge base of embryology. In 1902, Beard determined that cancer developed because of germ cells that lost direction to the gonads during the process of embryogenesis. These problematic germ cells ultimately developed into an "irresponsible trophoblast", as coined by Beard. This term implied that cancer was a normally functioning cell that simply functioned at the wrong place and time.

Beard believed that the following about the trophoblast: 1) The trophoblast represented the larval phase of human development 2) the embryo and trophoblast competed and were at odds of each other 3) at birth placenta dies and was ejected 4) Proteins in the trophoblast are "stereotactically different" from those in embryo.

In response to the irresponsible trophoblast's properties, Beard advocated the use of pancreatic enzymes to treat cancer. In its normal function, the trophoblast supplies nourishment to the embryo. In Beard's mind, the "initiation of pancreatic enzyme production by the fetus might be responsible for the regression of trophoblastic tissue in the natural course of pregnancy." In other words, Beard felt pancreatic enzyme activity was deficient in cancer patients, leading to the existence of the "irresponsible trophoblast" that would have been degraded during a healthy pregnancy.

This theory was widely controversial and went completely against what was widely accepted about cancer. Cancer was thought of as a disease defined by abnormal cell growth; Beard ultimately saw the disease as a function of normal cell activity, albeit in the wrong place (due to faulty enzyme activity). Given his long, respected career as an embryologist, Beard managed to attract a sizable following to his theory; he was also met with, however, a sizable number of detractors. Cancer was seen as a topic best left to the medical community; Beard's status as an embryologist made him an outsider in the field.

== Death and legacy ==
On 24 November 1924 Beard died from a stroke. His legacy, while filled with many accomplishments, remains conflicted. While making strides in embryology and advancing knowledge surrounding cell behavior, Beard's hypothesis regarding the origin of cancer have largely proven to be false. They do, however, point to the many different origins of cancer hypothesized by academics as study of the disease became of increased interest.
