= William Holbrook Beard =

American painter (1824–1900)

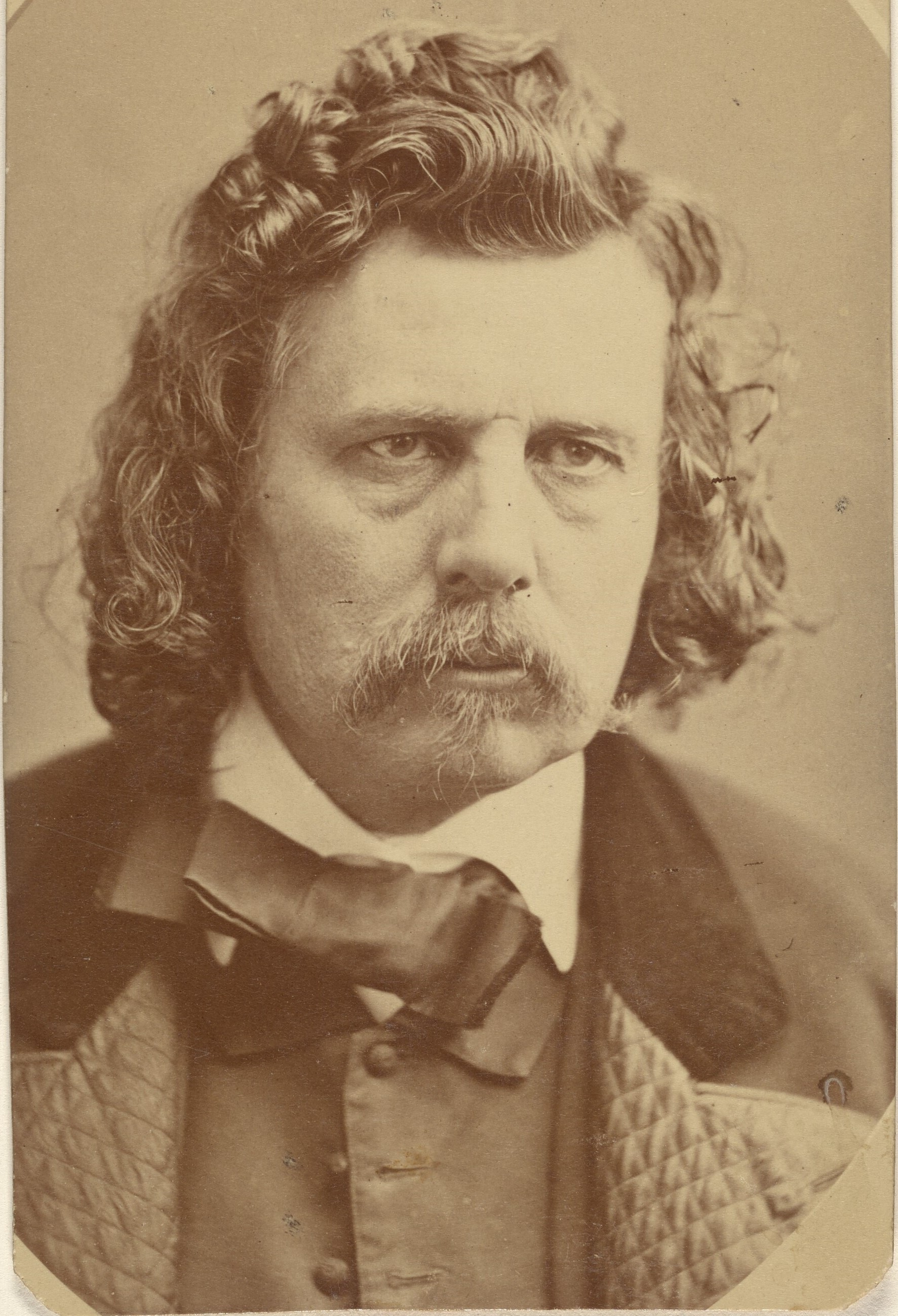
- Beard in c. 1880–1885
- Born: April 13, 1824; Painesville, Ohio, U.S.
- Died: February 20, 1900 (aged 75); New York City, U.S.
- Relatives: James Henry Beard (brother); Daniel Carter Beard (nephew)

William Holbrook Beard (April 13, 1824 – February 20, 1900) was an American painter who is known best for his satirical paintings of beasts performing human-like activities.

== Life ==
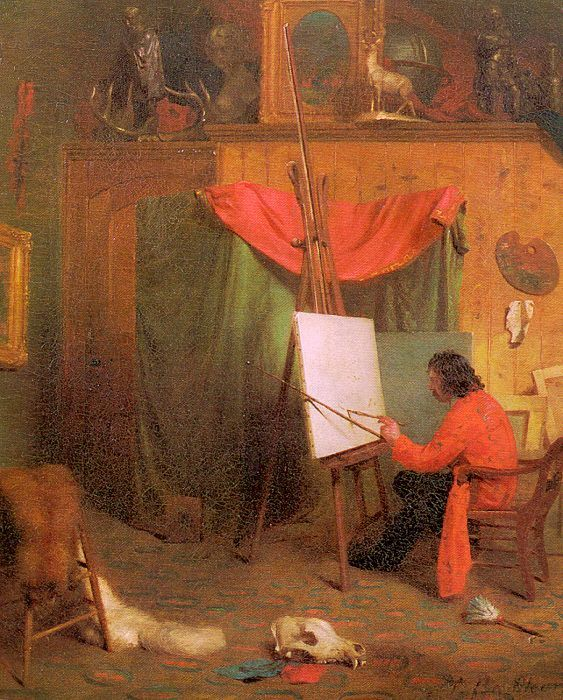
Self-Portrait in the Studio, 1860

Beard was born in Painesville, Ohio. He studied abroad, is associated with the Düsseldorf school of painting, and during 1861 relocated to New York City, where, in 1862, he became a member of the National Academy of Design. Beard initiated his own artist's studio on Tenth Street in New York City in a building known as the Studio Building.

Beard was a prolific artist. His humorous treatment of bears, cats, dogs, horses and monkeys, generally with some human occupation and expression, usually satirical, gave him a great vogue at one time, and his pictures were much reproduced.

His brother, James Henry Beard (1814–1893), was also a painter.

William is buried in Green-Wood Cemetery in Brooklyn, New York.

== Article features ==
In 1999, William Beard was featured in an article in the American Art Journal written by Sarah Burns. He is mentioned among other political satirists of the mid to late 19th century.

== Selected works ==
- Lo, The Poor Indian (1876) - oil painting, Utah Museum of Fine Arts.

== Gallery ==
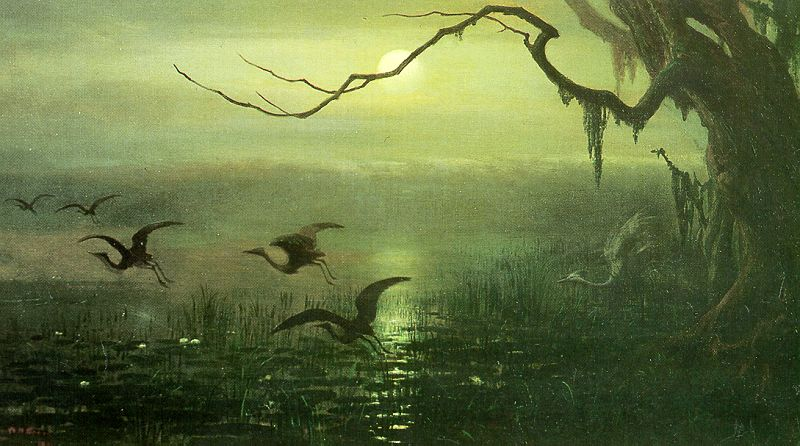
File:Beard,_William_Holbrook_~_Phantom_Crane,_1891,_oil_on_canvas.jpg

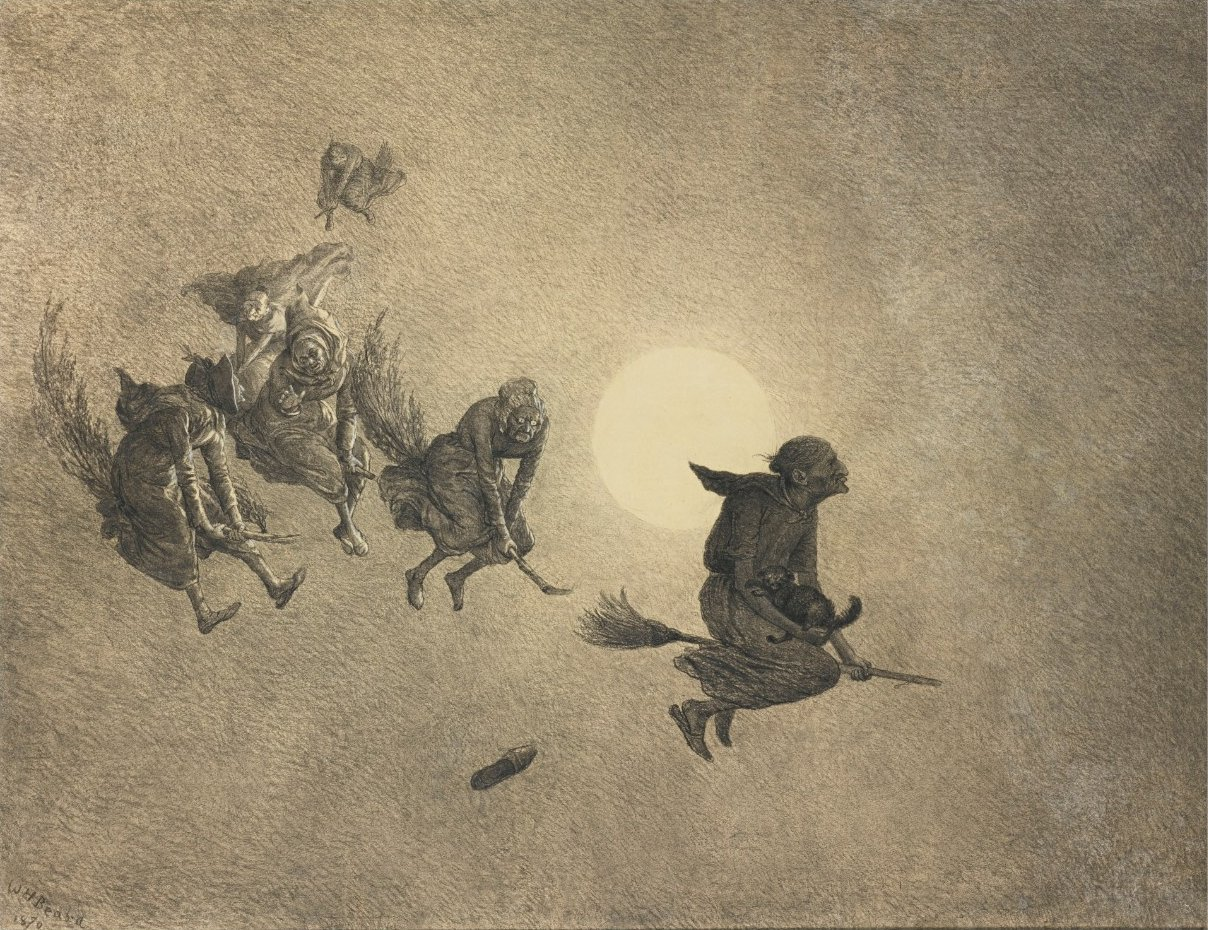
File:'The_Witches'_Ride'_by_William_Holbrook_Beard,_1870.jpg

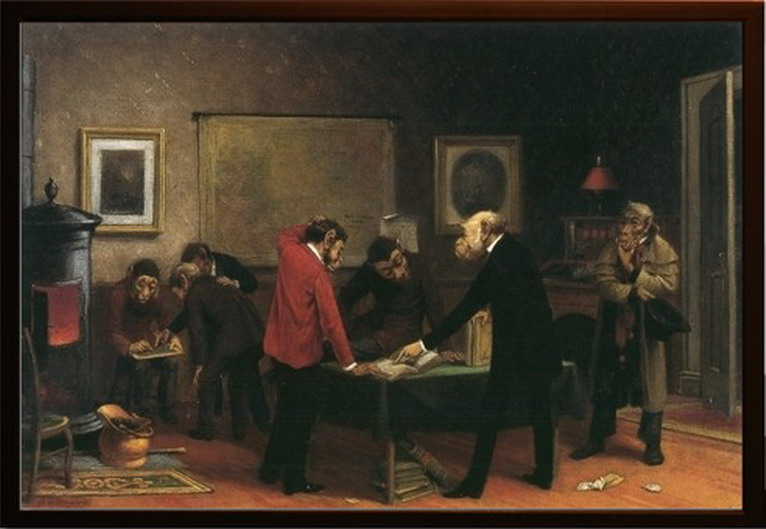
File:0005_Scientists_at_Work_by_William_Holbrook_Beard.jpg

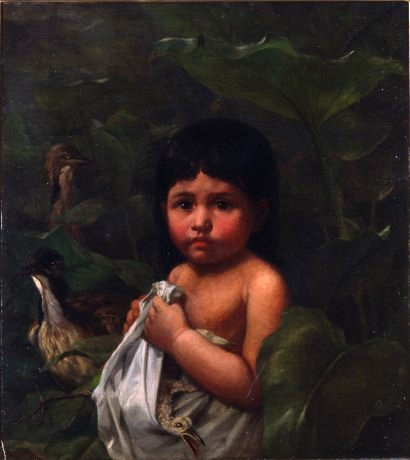
File:Seminole_Child_with_Bittern_by_William_Holbrook_Beard.jpg

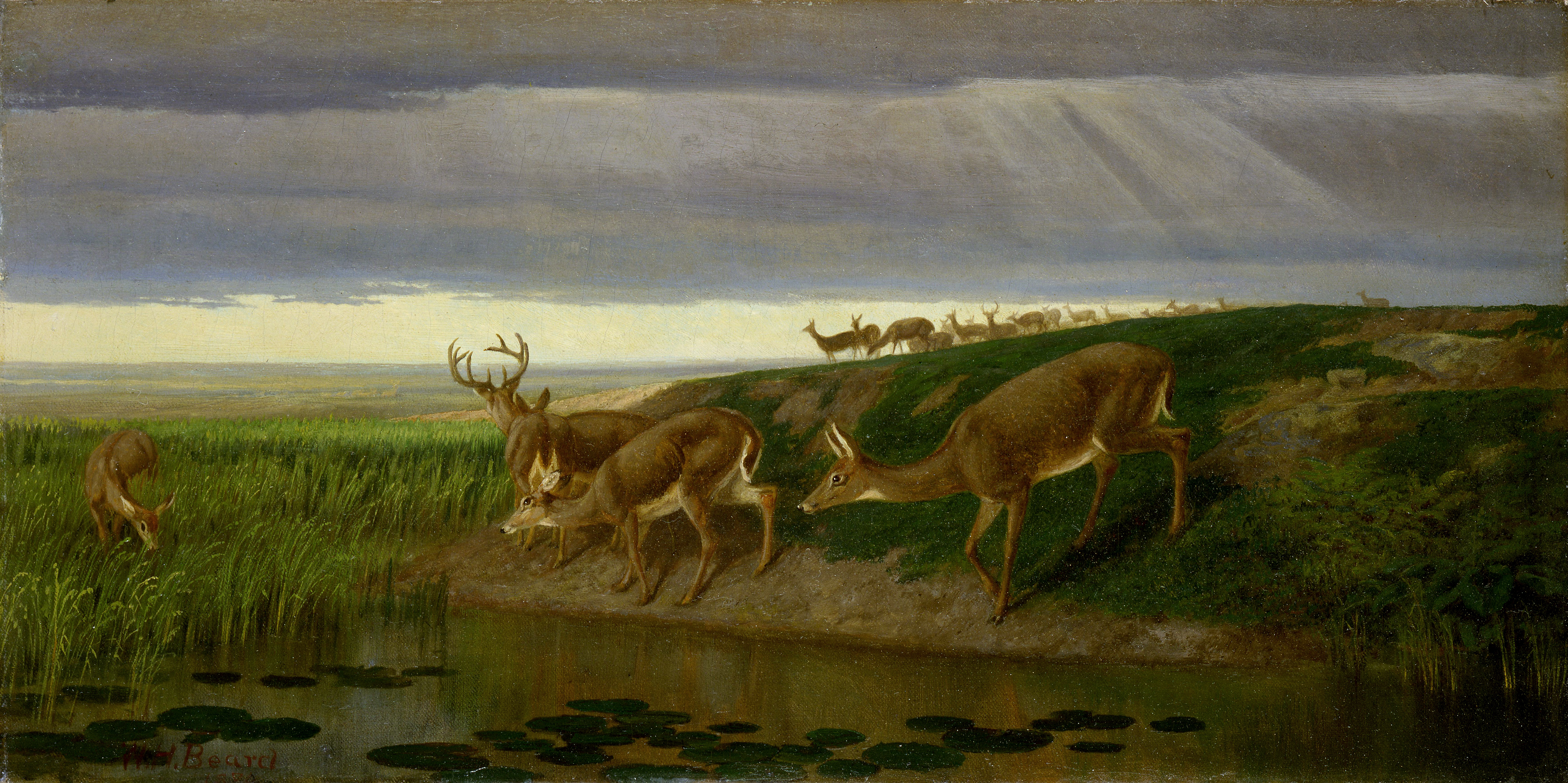
File:William_Holbrook_Beard_-_Deer_on_the_Prairie.jpg

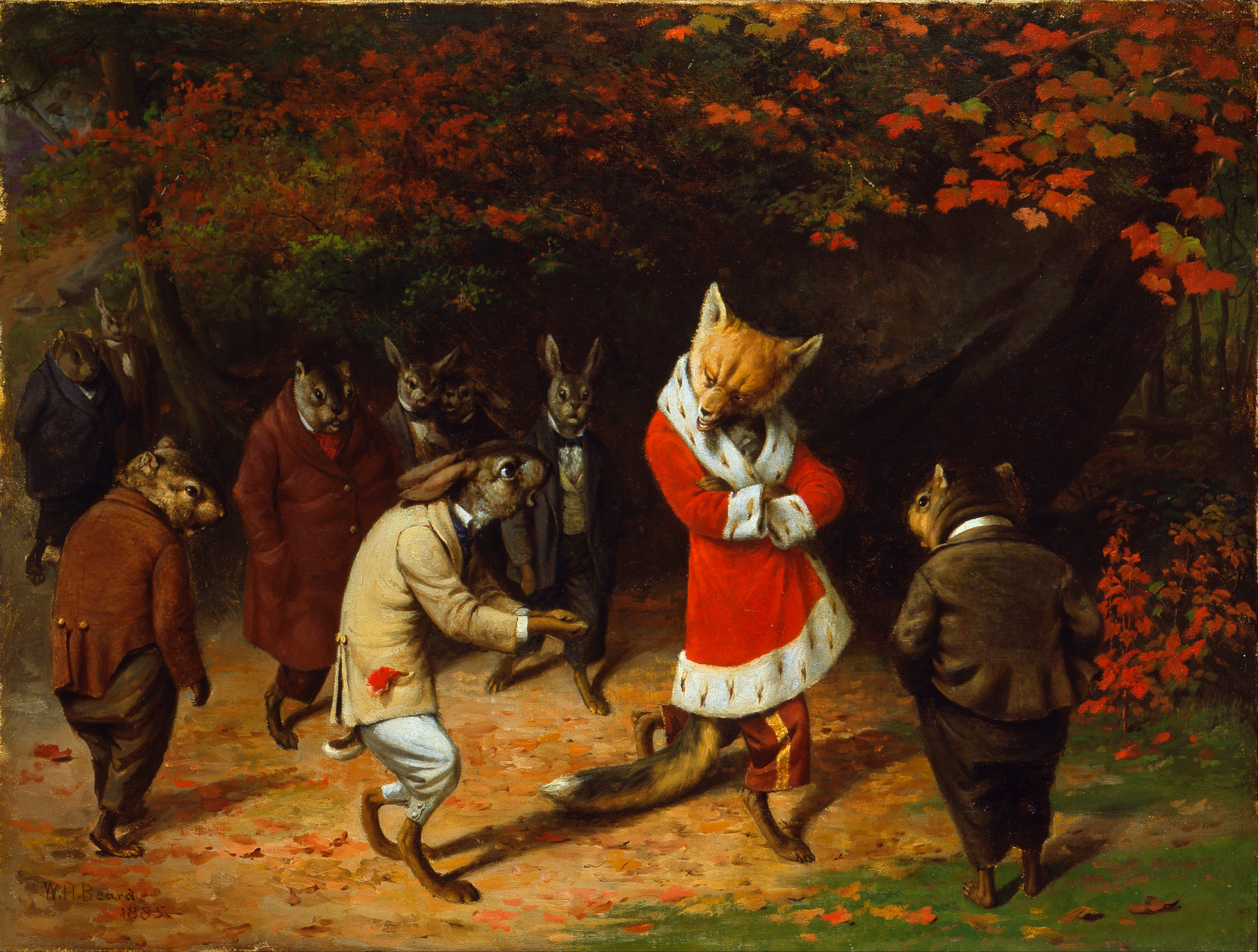
File:Beard,_William_Holbrook_-_His_Majesty_Receives_-_Google_Art_Project.jpg

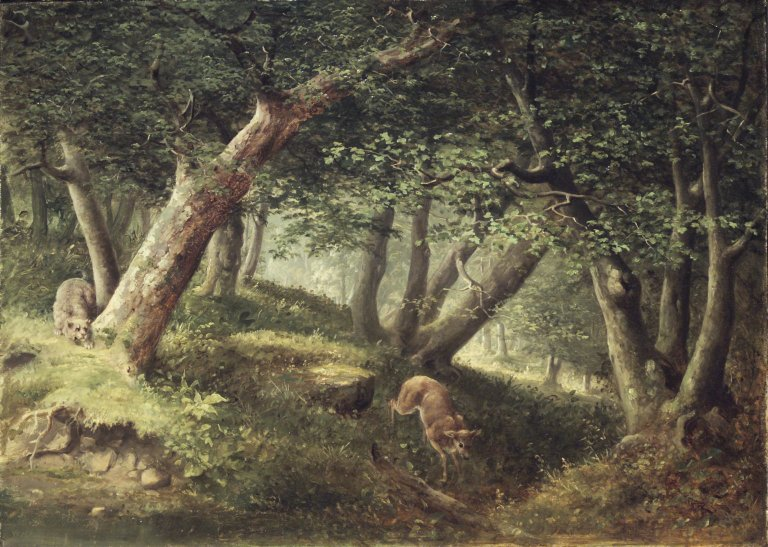
File:Brooklyn_Museum_-_In_the_Forest_-_William_Holbrook_Beard_-_overall.jpg

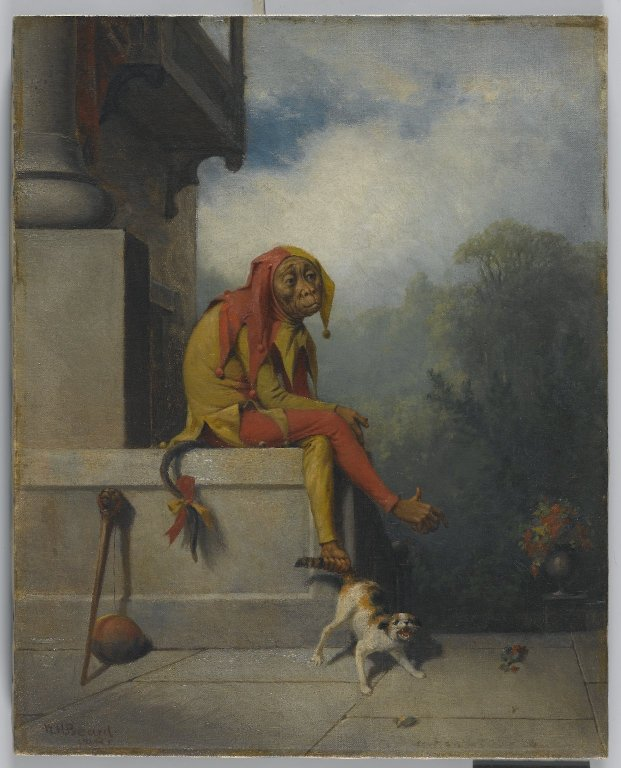
File:Brooklyn_Museum_-_For_What_Was_I_Created?_-_William_Holbrook_Beard_-_overall.jpg

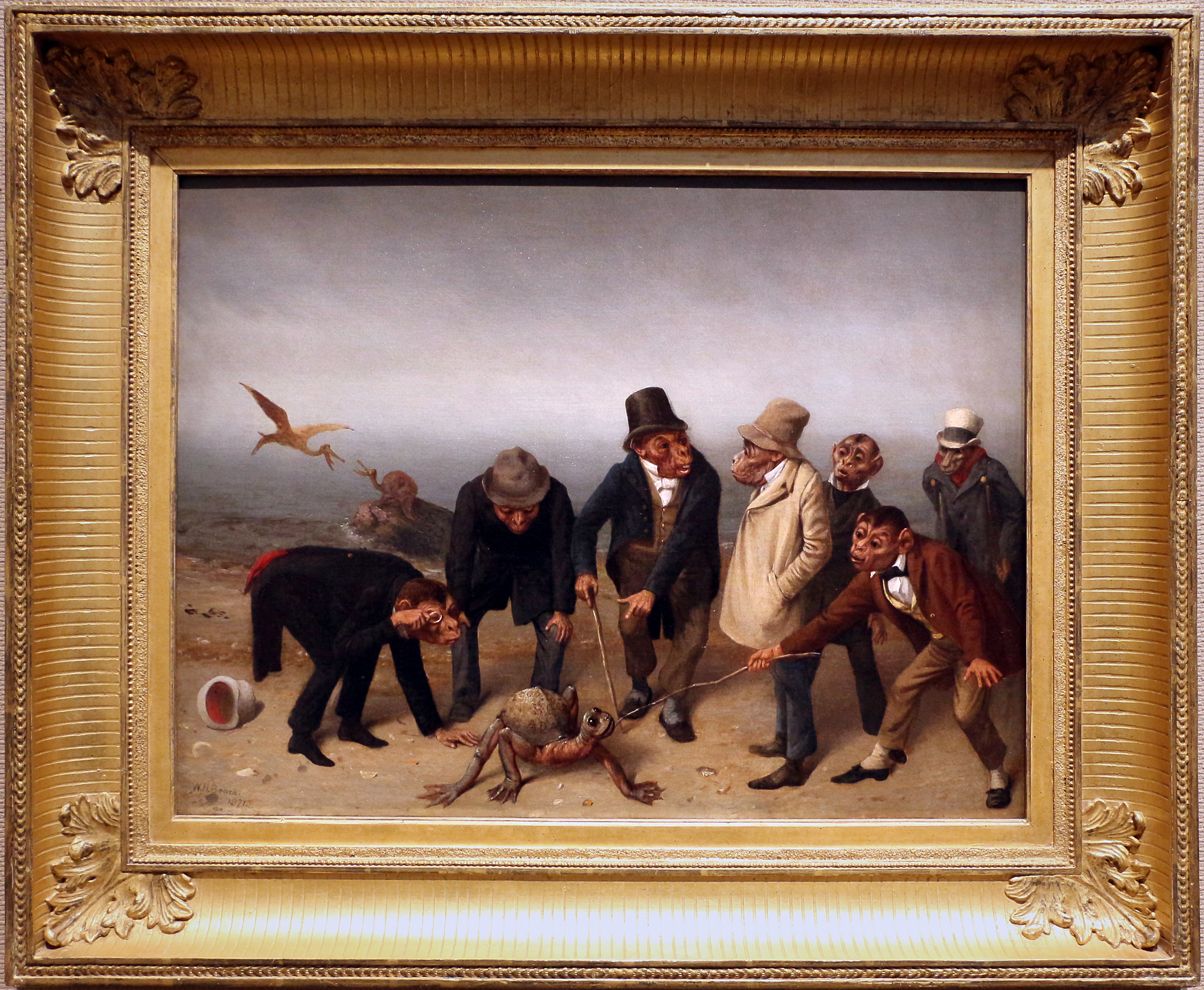
File:William_holbrook_beard,_la_scoperta_di_adamo,_1891.jpg

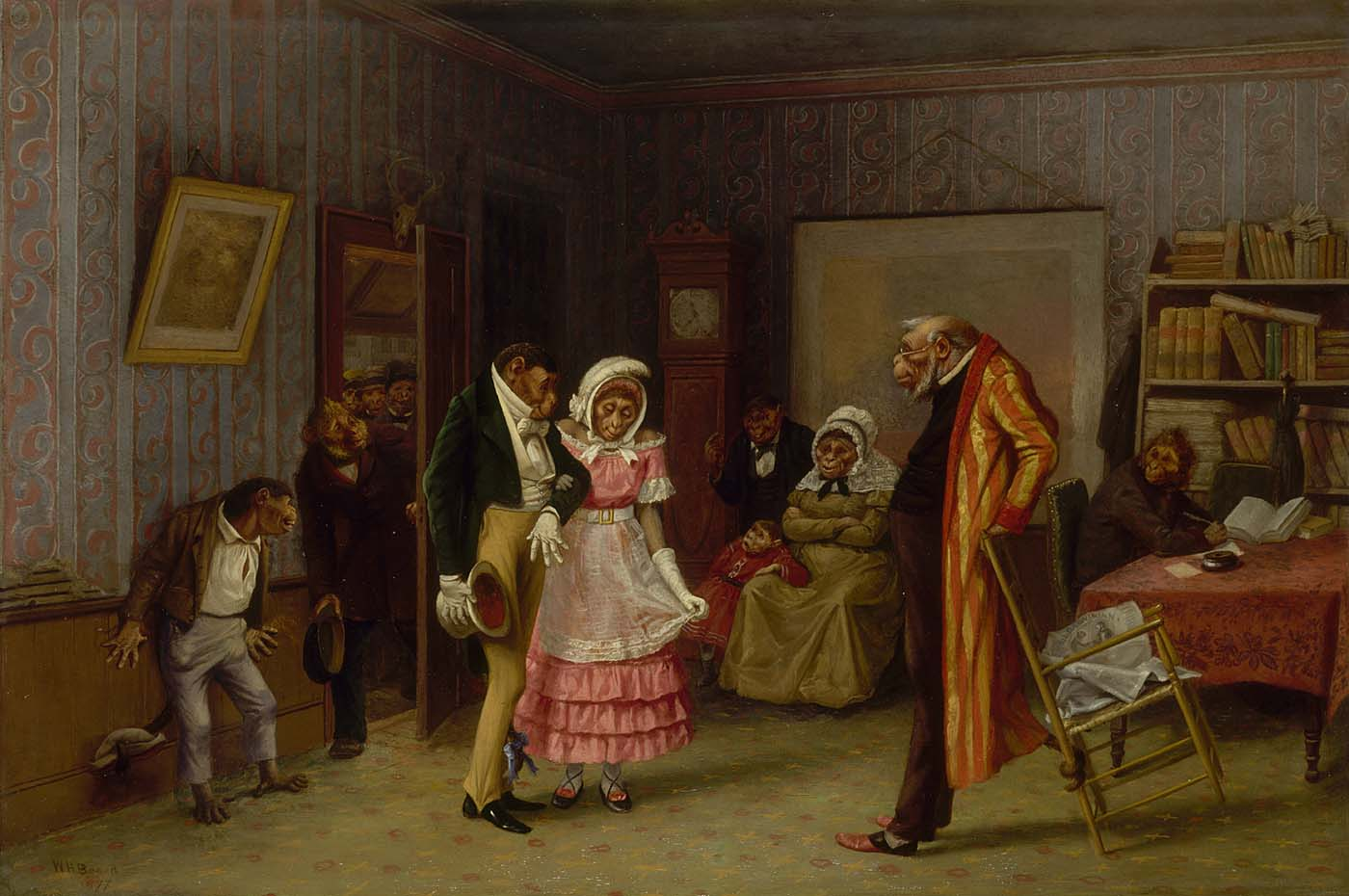
File:William_Holbrook_Beard_-_The_Runaway_Match_-_1977.55_-_Smithsonian_American_Art_Museum.jpg

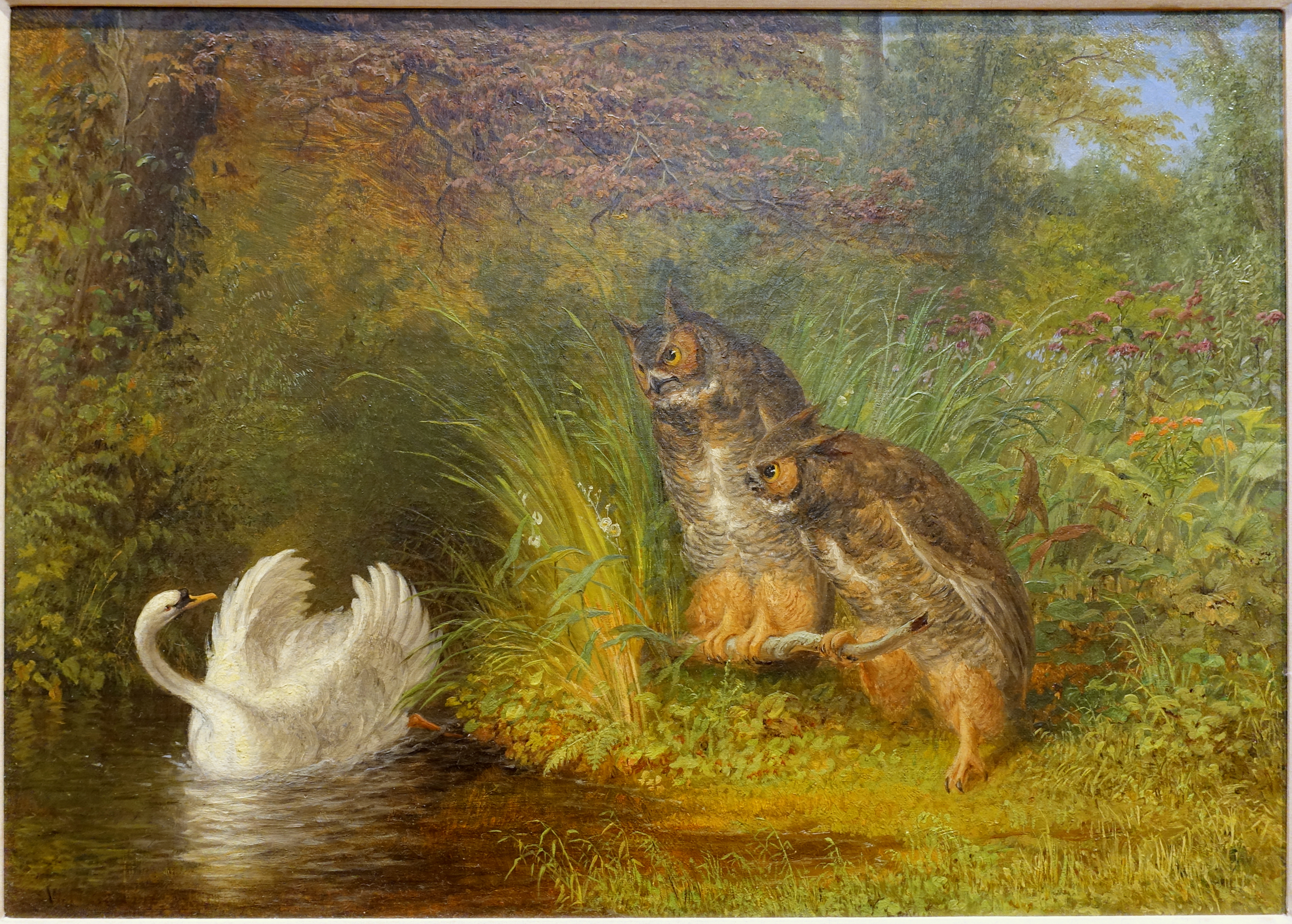
File:Susanna_and_the_Elders,_by_William_Holbrook_Beard,_1865,_oil_on_canvas_-_Currier_Museum_of_Art_-_Manchester,_NH_-_DSC07415.jpg

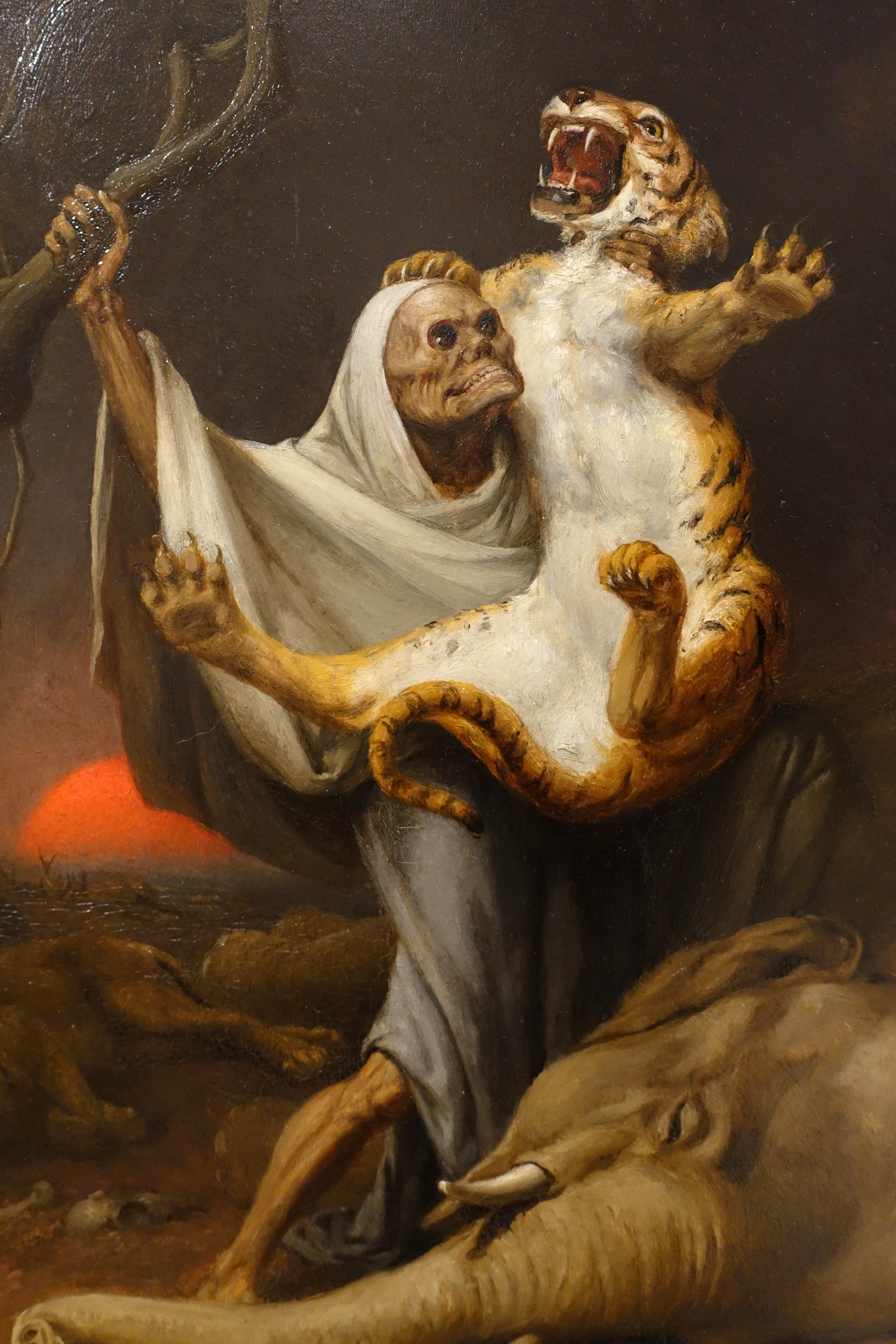
File:Power_of_Death_by_William_Holbrook_Beard,_detail,_c._1889-1890,_oil_on_board_-_Fogg_Art_Museum,_Harvard_University_-_DSC01197.jpg

File:Flaw_in_the_title_-_painted_by_W.H._Beard_;_engraved_by_Saml._Holyer_(sic)._LCCN2013645198.tif
