= William Beard (bone collector) =

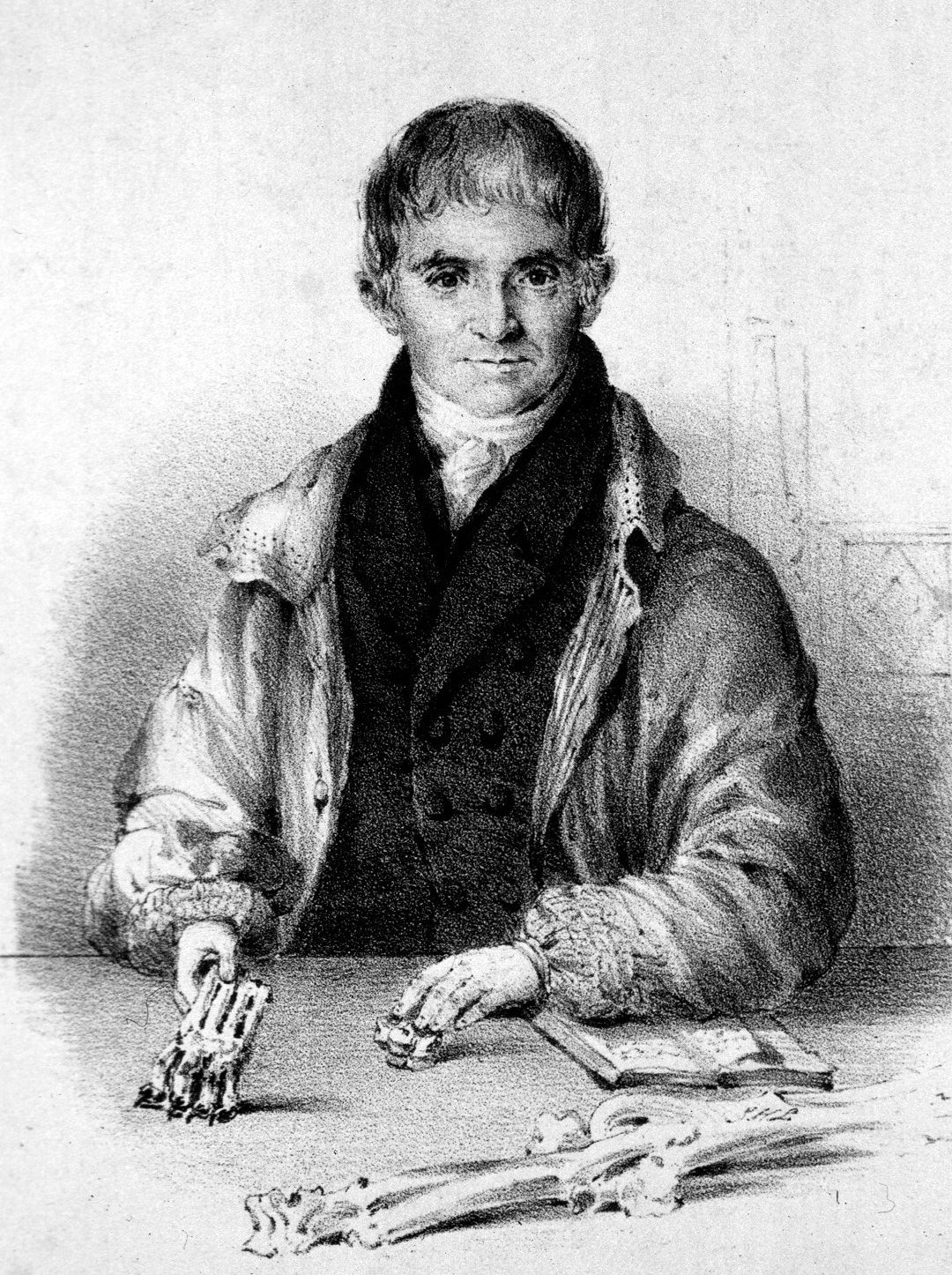
- William Beard c. 1829
- Born: 24 April 1772
- Died: 9 January 1868 (aged 95)

William Beard (24 April 1772 – 9 January 1868) was a British bone collector.

== Life ==
He was the son of a farmer at Banwell, Somerset, was born on 24 April 1772. He received such education as the parish clerk, who was also the schoolmaster of the village, could give him. Like his father, he worked on the land. He married and bought a small estate, which he farmed himself.

Excited by the tradition that Banwell Hill contained a large cavern, he persuaded two miners to join him (September 1824) in sinking a shaft. At a depth of about 100 feet they came to a stalactite cave. While making a second opening lower down the side of the hill, in order to form a better approach to this cave, he discovered a smaller cavern containing animal bones. With some help procured for him by the Bishop of Bath and Wells (G. H. Law), to whom the land belonged, Beard dug out the cavern, and found among the debris a number of bones of the bear, buffalo, reindeer, wolf, etc. Captivated with his discovery, he let his land, and spent all his time in searching for bones and putting them together.

He acted as guide to the many visitors who came to see the cavern and the bones he collected. He soon learned something of the scientific importance of his discoveries, and became an eager collector of the contents of the bone-caves of the neighbourhood, at Hutton, Bleadon, and Sandford. He died on 9 January 1868, in his ninety-sixth year.

== Assessment and legacy ==
He was a reserved man, of quaint manners, and with a high opinion of his own skill. The nickname of the "Professor" given him by the bishop pleased him, and he was generally called by it. He retained his bodily and mental activity almost to the day of his death. He was a small man, of short stature and light build. There is a bust of him in Banwell churchyard, and an engraving representing him at the age of seventy-seven in Rutter's Delineations of Somersetshire.

His collection of bones was bought by the Somersetshire Archæological and Natural History Society, and went to the Museum of Somerset at Taunton Castle. It included a large number of bones of Felis spelæa, found in England.

Beard kept as much relevant material as he could find of a specimen from a specific site, and he records of where it had come from. The other major collection of the time that passed to the Museum of Somerset consisted of "cabinet" specimens, without records of origin.
