= John F. Beard =

American politician

John Forbes Beard (August 13, 1822 – October 2, 1891) was an American plasterer and farmer from Gratiot, Wisconsin, who served a single one-year term as a member of the Wisconsin State Assembly from Lafayette County, Wisconsin.

== Background ==
Beard was born in Landisburg, Pennsylvania on August 13, 1822. He received a common school education. He left Pennsylvania in 1840 with $12, an umbrella and his clothes, walked the 250 miles to Wheeling, West Virginia, where he caught a boat to Cincinnati, Ohio; thence to Piqua, Ohio, where he worked for about a year before returning to Pennsylvania. He then learned the trade of plasterer, and left for Wisconsin in 1845, spending about a year in Galena, Illinois, then settled in New Diggings where on March 17, 1846, he married Amanda Criss, a native of Wheeling. He stayed in New Diggings for six years or so, before moving on, coming in 1851 to Gratiot. He served on the town board of Gratiot.

== Legislature ==
In 1873, Beard was elected to the Assembly from the Lafayette County district (Republican incumbent William H. Armstrong was not a candidate) as a candidate of the new Reform Party, a coalition of Democrats, reform and Liberal Republicans, and Grangers, which secured the election for two years of a Governor of Wisconsin and a number of state legislators. Beard drew 1,374 votes, winning over the 1,345 votes cast for Republican John S. Wiley. He was appointed to the standing committees on railroads, and on mining and smelting.

Beard was not a candidate for re-election the next year, and was succeeded by Democrat John Anderson.

== After the legislature ==
Beard remained in politics after serving in the Assembly, holding various township offices in Gratiot, and after the collapse of the Reform Party, he aligned with the Democratic Party. He and Amanda Criss had eleven children between 1846 and 1874, at least six of them still living as of 1881. Amanda died on March 6, 1879. As of 1881, Beard owned 596 acres of improved land, with a two-story brick house, large barn, stable, granary and carriage house, stocked with horses, cattle, and sheep. He described himself as "in religion, Liberal." He died October 2, 1891, in Sundance Wyoming of Brights disease.
