= William E. Beard =

American football player, journalist and historian (1873–1950)

Profile
- Position: Quarterback

Personal information
- Born: July 12, 1873; Estill Springs, Tennessee, U.S.
- Died: December 21, 1950 (aged 77); Nashville, Tennessee, U.S.

Career information
- College: Vanderbilt (1890–1893)

Awards and highlights
- 1st Vanderbilt quarterback to play Tennessee.; Dubbed Vanderbilt the Commodores

William Ewing Beard (July 12, 1873 – December 21, 1950) was a college football player, soldier, journalist, war correspondent, naval historian, and long-time officer of the Tennessee Historical Commission and member of the Tennessee Historical Society. He wrote several books on Nashville and dubbed Vanderbilt University the Commodores.

== Early life ==
Beard was born on July 12, 1873, in Estill Springs, Tennessee, to Richard Beard, a Confederate captain, and Marie Dromgoole, of Estill Springs, Tennessee. He attended Vanderbilt from 1890 to 1893. In 1892 Beard was the first Vanderbilt quarterback to play Tennessee.

== Writer ==
Beard joined the staff of the Nashville American in 1896. In 1897 he was the first to dub Vanderbilt the Commodores. While at the American, Beard employed former Vandy player Bob Blake.

Beard became the state news editor of the Banner in 1910, promoted to associated editor in 1933.

== Bibliography ==
- It Happened in Nashville. 1912.
- The Battle of Nashville. 1913.
- Red Letter Days in Nashville. 1925.
- Nashville, the Home of History Makers. 1929.
- Andrew Jackson: Man of Destiny. 1942.
- Nashville, a memoir. 1943.
- Men Make the Navy: Recruiting of 17-year-olds Recalls Fact Most American Naval Heroes Joined Service in 'teens. 1943.
