= Mary Beard (nursing) =

American public health nurse and nursing educator

Mary Beard (1876 – December 4, 1946, New York City) was director of the American Red Cross Nursing Service from 1938 until 1944.

After graduating from the New York Hospital School of Nursing In 1903, Beard began working as a home nurse with the Visiting Nurse Association (VNA). Before leaving the VNA in 1910, she had been the director of the organization. After a brief stint at the Laboratory of Surgical Pathology at Columbia University, Beard became director of the Boston Instructive District Nursing Association in 1912. Later that year, she part of the group that founded the National Organization for Public Health Nursing. She was their president from 1916 until 1919 while concurrently chairing a Council of National Defense Medical Board's Committee on Public Health Nursing during World War I.

Beard began working for the Rockefeller Foundation (RF) in 1924 and in 1931, became Associate Director of the RF's International Health Division (IHD).

In 1938, she started working at the American Red Cross and was chair of the Office of Defense Health and Welfare Service's Subcommittee on Nursing, preparing nurses for wartime service. She retired in 1944.
