= Paul Beard (spiritualist) =

English author and poet

Paul Beard (14 October 1904 – 9 June 2002) was an English author and poet who for 16 years was the President of the College of Psychic Studies. Beard was based in London, England. The organization was devoted to finding in spiritualism evidence of life after death. During his tenure as a member and president Beard wrote an article that was published in Spiritual Frontiers in 1970 on "How to Guard Against Possession." During this research he experimented extensively with using a ouija board. In his role as President of CPS, he lectured and mentored many aspiring students in the art of spiritualism.

Beard has written a trilogy of books analyzing the evidence for and against the survival of the human soul after death. He made a lifetime study of psychical research. He was also a member of the Society for Psychical Research for some 25 years.

== Books ==
- Survival of Death. London: Hodder & Stoughton, 1966. ISBN 0-946259-25-9.
- Living On. A study of altering consciousness after death. London: George Allen & Unwin, 1980. ISBN 0-04-133009-9. Reprint Pilgrim Books, 1987; ISBN 0-946259-24-0.
- Hidden Man. Pilgrim Books, 1986; ISBN 0-946259-16-X.
