= William Beard (cricketer) =

New Zealand cricketer

Personal information
- Full name: William Samuel Beard
- Source: ESPNcricinfo, 3 June 2016

William Beard was a New Zealand cricketer. He played first-class cricket for Auckland and Canterbury between 1878 and 1887.

== See also ==
- List of Auckland representative cricketers
