= Abbeville Scimitar =

The Abbeville Scimitar
- Type: Biweekly newspaper
- Publisher: William P. Beard
- Founded: July 11, 1914
- Ceased publication: November 1917
- Language: English
- OCLC number: 28483678

The Abbeville Scimitar was a short-lived newspaper of Abbeville, South Carolina in the early 20th century, notable chiefly for its outspokenly racist publisher, William P. "Bull Moose" Beard, an ally of Coleman Livingston Blease, a South Carolina politician known for his racist rhetoric. The Scimitar was published weekly upon its debut on July 11, 1914, but became a bi-weekly from June 15, 1915, until the paper's close in November 1917.

In modern sources, the Scimitar is remembered most often in connection to its stance on the lynching of wealthy African-American landowner and Abbeville resident Anthony Crawford in October 1916, and the related statements and editorials it published about the event, in which the paper unabashedly endorsed the lynching and opposed the criminal prosecution of the men responsible for the act.

Some historians have claimed that the output of the Scimitar offered the most frank and candid appraisal of lynching, explicitly defining it as a tool of racist oppression by whites, rather than cloaking it in euphemism, as was typical for contemporary newspaper accounts of lynchings, most of which avoided endorsement of lynching but at the same time declined to explicitly oppose it. Regarding the incident, and lynching in general, Beard wrote in the Scimitar: "Know that when white men cease to whip or kill negroes who become obnoxious, that they will take advantage of the laxity, and soon make this state untenable for whites of all kinds."

In 1917, the paper vehemently opposed United States involvement in World War I, often on similarly racist grounds. In numerous editorials, William Beard wrote that white men were obligated to oppose the war, because of the challenge it posed to white supremacy, specifically how white enlisted men might theoretically ever have to salute a black officer, and how this might affect the relations between the two once the war was over. In one typical editorial on the subject, Beard mused "I wonder if the old pine tree at the baseball park would hold them all if that bunch of sassy nigger preachers had made such talk at the courthouse here." Because of his anti-war diatribes, Beard was convicted of sedition in November 1917 and sentenced to one year and one day in prison plus a $500 fine. The Scimitar was shut down for good.
