= Mark Beard (artist) =

American artist (born 1956)

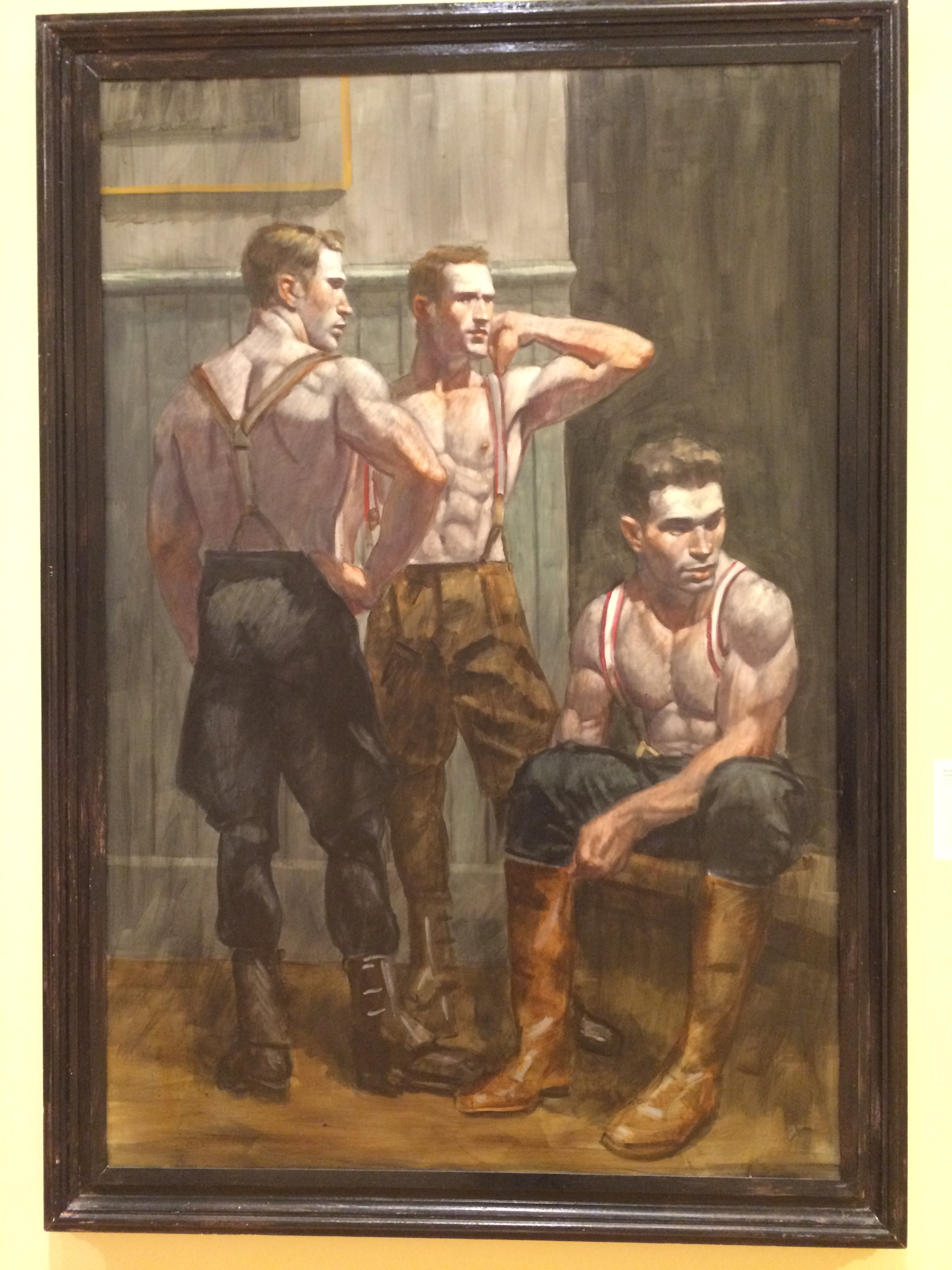
Mattatuck Museum 19 - Mark Beard painting

Mark Beard (born 1956 in Salt Lake City) is an American artist. In addition to being a noted stage set designer., Beard works in prints, paint, and as a sculptor. His portraits, nudes, bronzes, and handicrafted books have been exhibited all over the world.

== Life and work ==
Beard resides in a studio in Hell's Kitchen that he bought with his partner, James Manfredi.

Between 1986 and 1997, he designed more than 20 theatrical sets in New York City, London, Cologne, Vienna, and Frankfurt.

Beard is noted for his objection to the fact that while artists may pass through different stages or periods, success comes from branding the artist with one particular style. Beard therefore has developed a number of distinct artistic personalities, each with a detailed biography and portrait photograph, to enable himself to work in a variety of styles and mediums.

His different artistic personalities include:

- Bruce Sargeant (1898–1938), (a spoof on John Singer Sargent) who died in a tragic wrestling accident;
- Hippolyte-Alexandre Michallon (1849–1930), French beaux-art painter who was the teacher of Bruce Sargeant;
- Edith Thayer Cromwell (1893–1962), an English friend and colleague of Michallon;
- Brechtholdt Streeruwitz (1890–1973), a rival of Cromwell from Vienna; and
- Peter Coulter (b. 1948), a New York-based artist who was influenced by Cromwell and Streeruwitz's work.

Each of these artists works in a different style. For example, Streeruwitz is expressionist and more somber, while Coulter's style is postmodern art.

Featured works by Beard acting as Bruce Sargeant (such as large paintings, friezes and a bronze sculpture) have been installed since 2005 in Abercrombie & Fitch's flagship stores in New York, Los Angeles, London, Milan, Paris, Brussels, Amsterdam, Copenhagen, Munich and in Tokyo.

== Installed Works ==
- 2004 Bronze doors Edmond J. Safra Synagogue
- 1996 Children's Opera House, Foyer, Opera House, Cologne
- 1995 Painted murals, Foyer, Opera House, Cologne
- 1993 Designed and painted new 75-seat theater: West-End / State Theater, Kölner Schauspiel, Cologne
- 1991 Mural Commission: The public spaces of das Schauspielhaus, Vienna
- 1984 "Windows on White", New York
- 1983 "The Parallel Window", New York

== Collections ==
Beard's works are found in notable museum collections, including the Museum of Fine Arts, Boston, the Wadsworth Atheneum, the Whitney Museum of American Art, the Metropolitan Museum of Art, the Museum of Modern Art, New York, the Staatliche Graphische Sammlung München, Albertina, as well as in Princeton, Harvard, and Yale universities amongst others.
