= Richard Beard (courtier) =

English diplomat

Richard Beard (fl. 1540) was a sixteenth-century English courtier.

Beard was a member of the Privy Chamber of Henry VIII of England. He was one of the envoys, along with Nicholas Wotton, who was involved in negotiating a marriage between his monarch and his fourth wife, Anne of Cleves.
