= 1906 Intercalated Games =

International multi-sport event in Greece

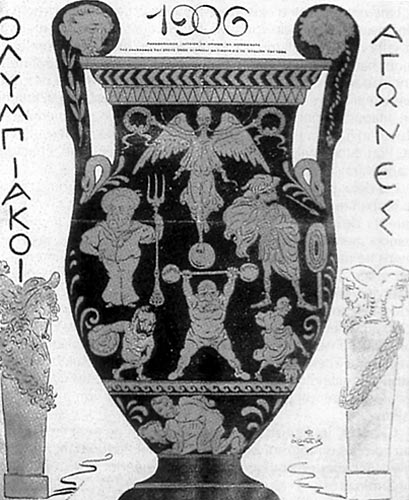
- Contemporary artwork for the 1906 Intercalated Games
- Location: Athens, Greece
- Nations: 20
- Athletes: 854 (848 men, 6 women)
- Opening: 22 April 1906
- Closing: 2 May 1906
- Opened by: King George I
- Stadium: Panathenaic Stadium

The 1906 Intercalated Games or 1906 Olympic Games (Greek: Μεσολυμπιάδα, romanized: Mesolympiada, lit. 'Mesolympics'), held from 22 April 1906 to 2 May 1906, was an international multi-sport event that was celebrated in Athens, Greece. It was at the time considered to be part of the series of the Olympic Games, and was referred to as the "Second International Olympic Games in Athens" by the International Olympic Committee (IOC). However, the medals distributed to participants during these Games were later stripped of official recognition when, in 1949, the International Olympic Committee (IOC) decided to no longer recognize the 1906 Games, and as a result they are not displayed with the collection of Olympic medals at the Olympic Museum in Lausanne, Switzerland.

The 1906 Games is noted for its influence on the Olympic tradition and the records broken during these Games are recorded in history, but are no longer considered part of the Olympic records. 894 athletes from 20 nations competed in this competition. The idea behind the Intercalated Games was to have an Olympics in Greece every four years, but this would be the first and last. The idea was not pursued further, and is sometimes termed the "forgotten Games" in the context of the Olympics. The next Olympic Games was the 1908 Summer Olympics in London; the next time the Olympic Games returned to Greece was 98 years later in 2004, also in Athens.

== Intercalated Games ==
The Intercalated Olympic Games were to be a series of International Olympic Games halfway between what is now known as the Games of the Olympiad, old and new. This proposed series of Games, intercalated in the Olympic Games cycle, was always to be held in Athens and was to have equal status with the international Games. However, the only such Games was held in 1906.

One reason for the Games in 1906 was to celebrate the tenth anniversary of the 1896 Games.

The first Intercalated Games had been scheduled by the International Olympic Committee in 1901 as part of a new schedule, where every four years, in between the internationally organised Games, there would be an Intermediate Games held in Athens.

This was a compromise; after the successful Games of Athens 1896, the Greeks suggested they could organise the Games every four years. Since they had the accommodation and had proven they could hold well-organised Games, they received substantial public support. However, Pierre de Coubertin, the founder of the International Olympic Committee, opposed this, as he had intended for the first Games to be in Paris in 1900. After Paris had lost the première Olympics, De Coubertin did not want the Games to be permanently hosted elsewhere.

The 1900 Games were overshadowed by the Exposition Universelle, whose organising committee disagreed with De Coubertin's ideas to such an extent that he resigned. The organisation of the 1900 Games was haphazard by today's standards, and although some events, such as archery, drew widespread attention, many others were poorly attended. Historians' opinions still differ over which events should be considered "Olympic".

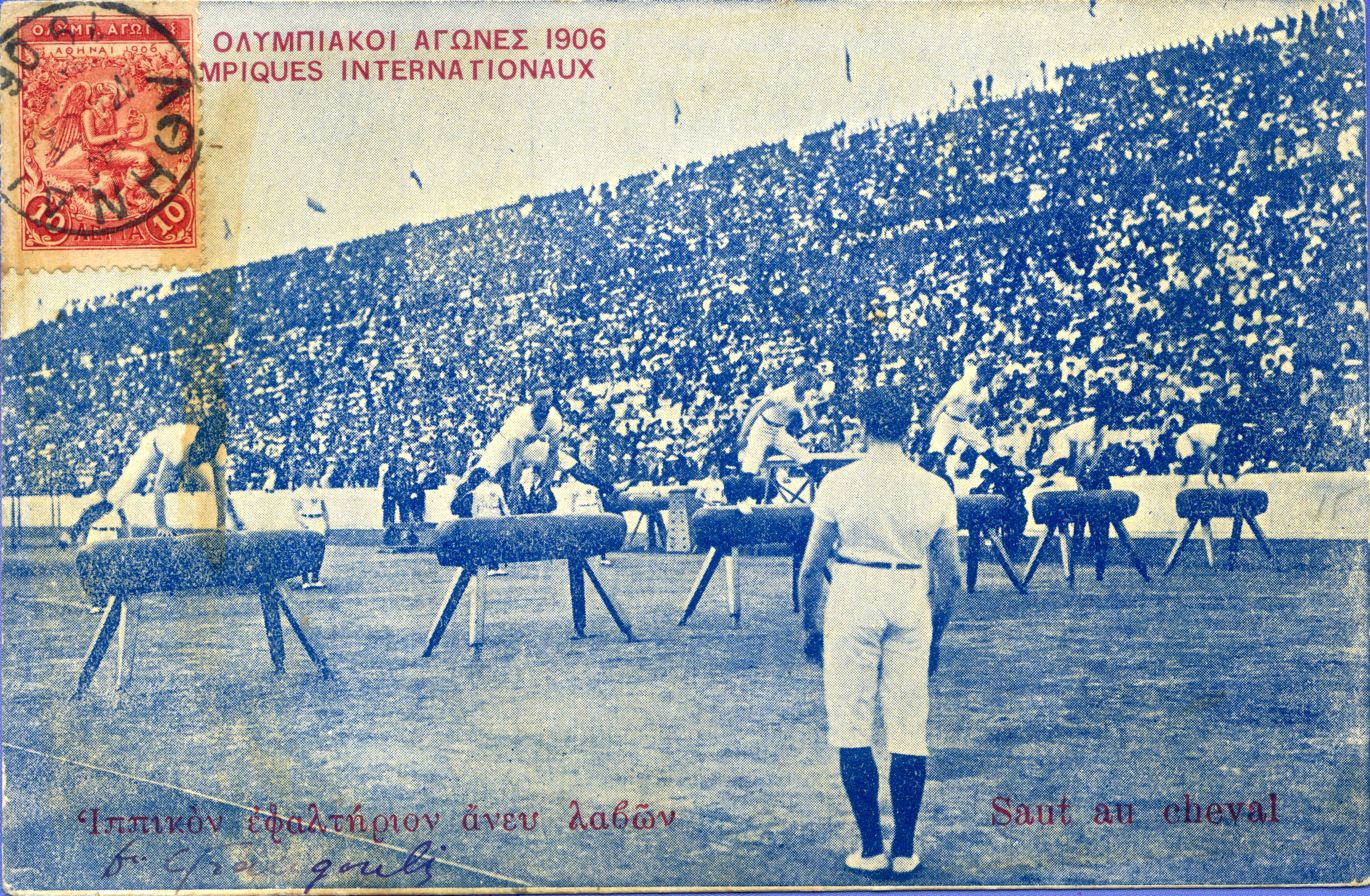
Vaulting at the 1906 Games

Consequently, the IOC supported the Greek idea by granting them a second series of quadrennial Games in between the first series. All of the Games would be International Olympic Games: the difference was that half of them would follow De Coubertin's idea of "organisation internationale", while the other half would follow the Greeks' idea of a permanent home with the Committee of the Olympic Games, as it was then known, as experienced organisers.

This was a departure from the ancient schedule, but it was expected that, if the ancient Greeks could keep a four-year schedule, the modern Olympic Movement could keep a two-year schedule. As 1902 was now too close to be logistically workable, and Greece was experiencing political and economic difficulties, the 2nd Olympic Games in Athens were scheduled for 1906, and the IOC as a whole gave Greece full support for the organisation.

The 1904 Summer Olympics in St. Louis, Missouri were overshadowed by the Louisiana Purchase Exposition, and their organisation was even worse than that of Paris 1900, while travel difficulties meant that only 20% of the athletes were non-American; of these, half were Canadian.

It was clear the Olympic Movement was in a dire situation and desperately needed to recapture the spirit of Athens 1896. It also needed to do so quickly, as to those who did not participate in St. Louis, 1908 was a gap of eight years, by which time there would be little, if any, goodwill left for the Games.

To make matters worse, Rome, the proposed host for 1908, was also planning an exhibition at the same time as the Games, which had been responsible for the failures of Paris and St. Louis.

To the IOC, the 1906 Athens Games being just around the corner would have been a lifeline. While De Coubertin still opposed the idea and did not do anything more than his function required of him, the IOC as a whole gave the Greek organising committee full support for the organisation.

These games offered Greece the huge opportunity to show that it was important to Europe's present and its past. It is clear from the beginning that the Olympic Games 1906 became "a grand project far beyond the status of a mere sports meeting", with new structures built to accommodate the events including the restoration of the ancient stadium in Athens.

== Improvements ==
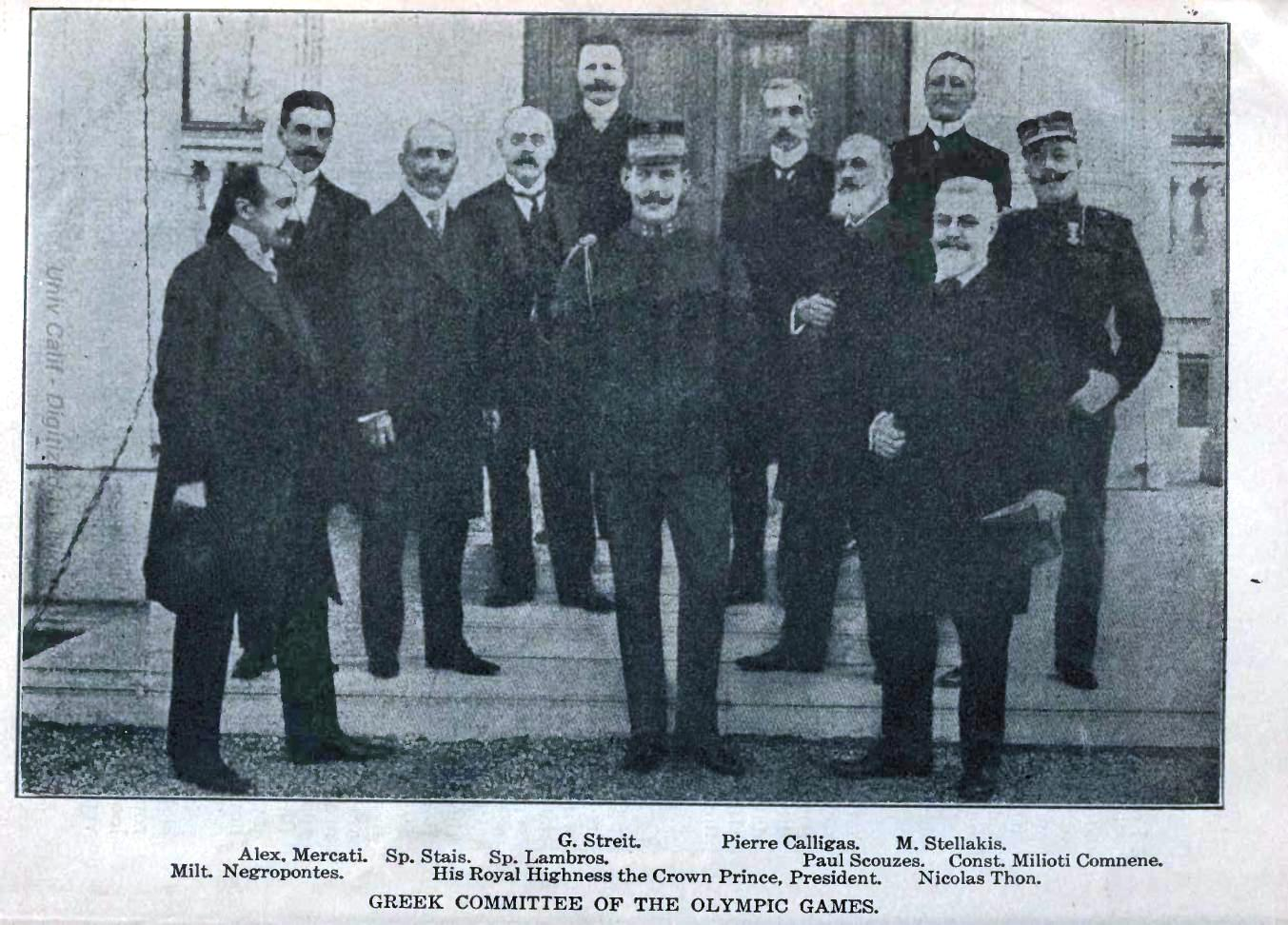
The Organising Committee of the 1906 Games

The 1906 Games were quite successful: unlike the Games of 1900, 1904 or 1908, they were not stretched out over several months, and unlike 1900 and 1904, they were not overshadowed by an international exposition. Their crisp implementation was most likely instrumental in the continued existence of the Games.

Contemporary publications praised the Games:

The Olympic Games of 1906 will go down in athletic history as the most remarkable festival of its kind ever held. They exceeded in every way the successful Olympic Games of 1896 ... The scenes and incidents and everything in connection with the Olympic Games of 1906 made an impression that will never be forgotten and it is hoped that future Olympic Games will be up to the standard of the ones of 1906.

These Games were the first to have:

- All athlete registration going through their NOCs.
- The Opening of the Games as a separate event: an event at which the athletes marched into the stadium in national teams, each following its national flag.
- An Olympic Village (at the Zappeion).
- A formal closing ceremony.
- The raising of national flags for the medalists.

These, along with various other changes, are now accepted as tradition.

== Games ==
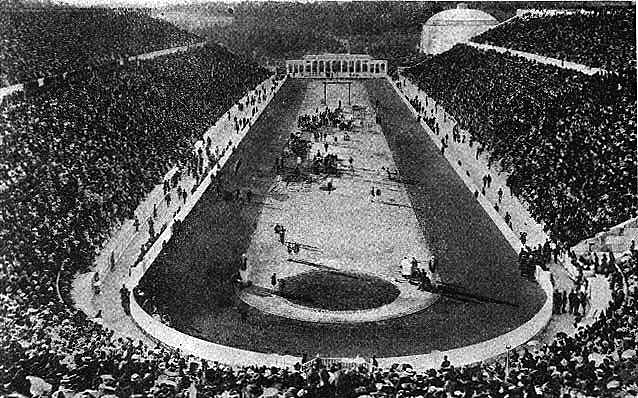
Panathinaiko Stadium in 1906

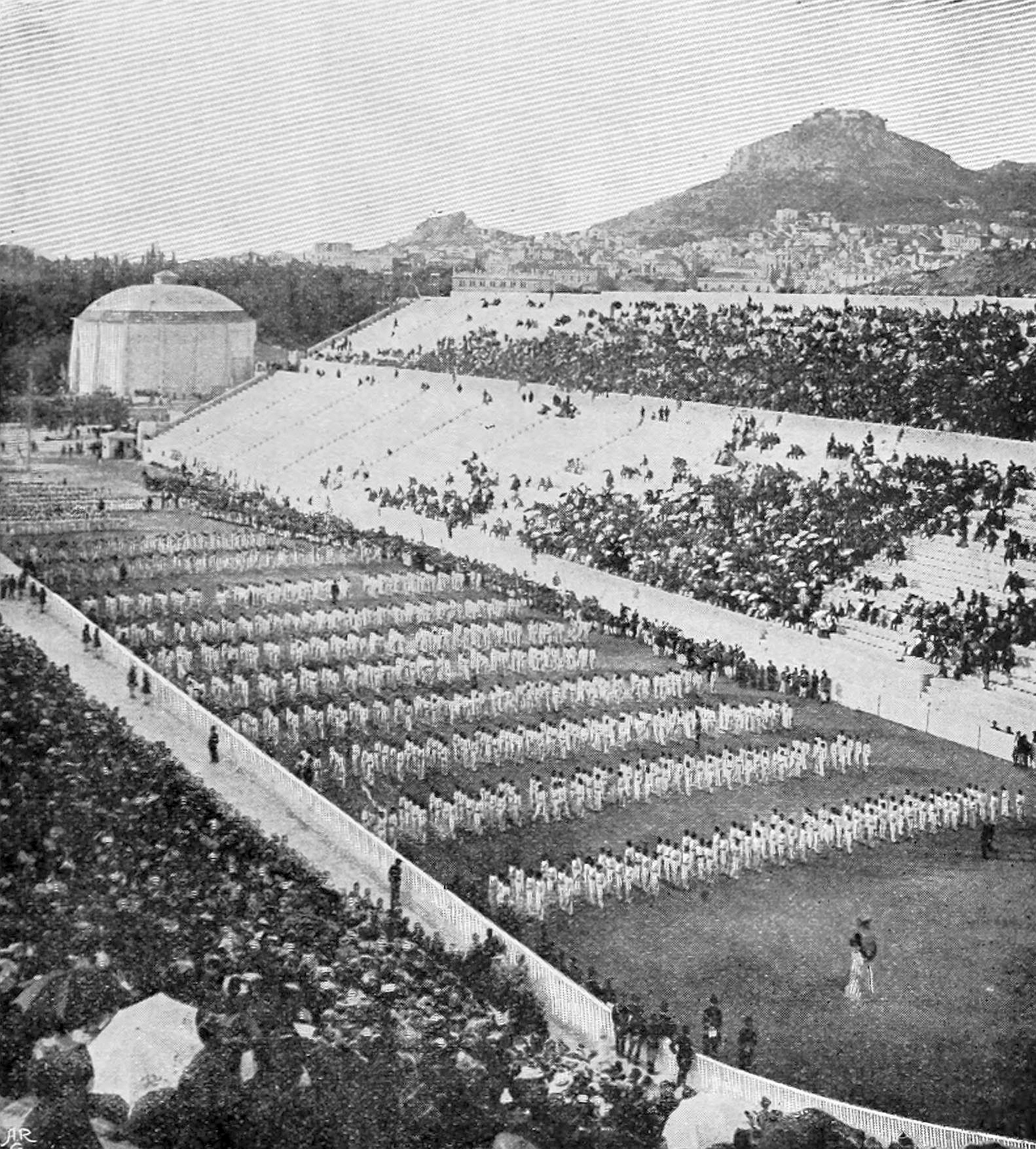
Panathinaiko Stadium

The Games were held from 22 April to 2 May 1906, in Athens, Greece. They took place in the Panathenaic Stadium, which had already hosted the 1896 Games and the earlier Zappas Olympics of 1870 and 1875. The Games excluded several disciplines that had occurred during the past two Games; it was unclear whether they ought to have been part of the Olympic Games. Added to the program were the javelin throw and the pentathlon.

The 1906 Games is noted for its opening and closing ceremonies, which initiated this tradition. The official Olympic website notes there was no opening ceremony, with parade of athletes, at the 1896, 1900, and 1904 Games, and notes the 1906 Games as the genesis of the idea; but the 1908 Summer Games is the first Olympics still recognized as such with the opening parade of athletes which was more organized. The 1908 Games introduced the tradition of the host coming in as the last in the parade also.

=== Opening ===
These were the first Games to include an opening ceremony with athletes marching into the stadium as national teams behind their flags. King George I officially opened the Games.

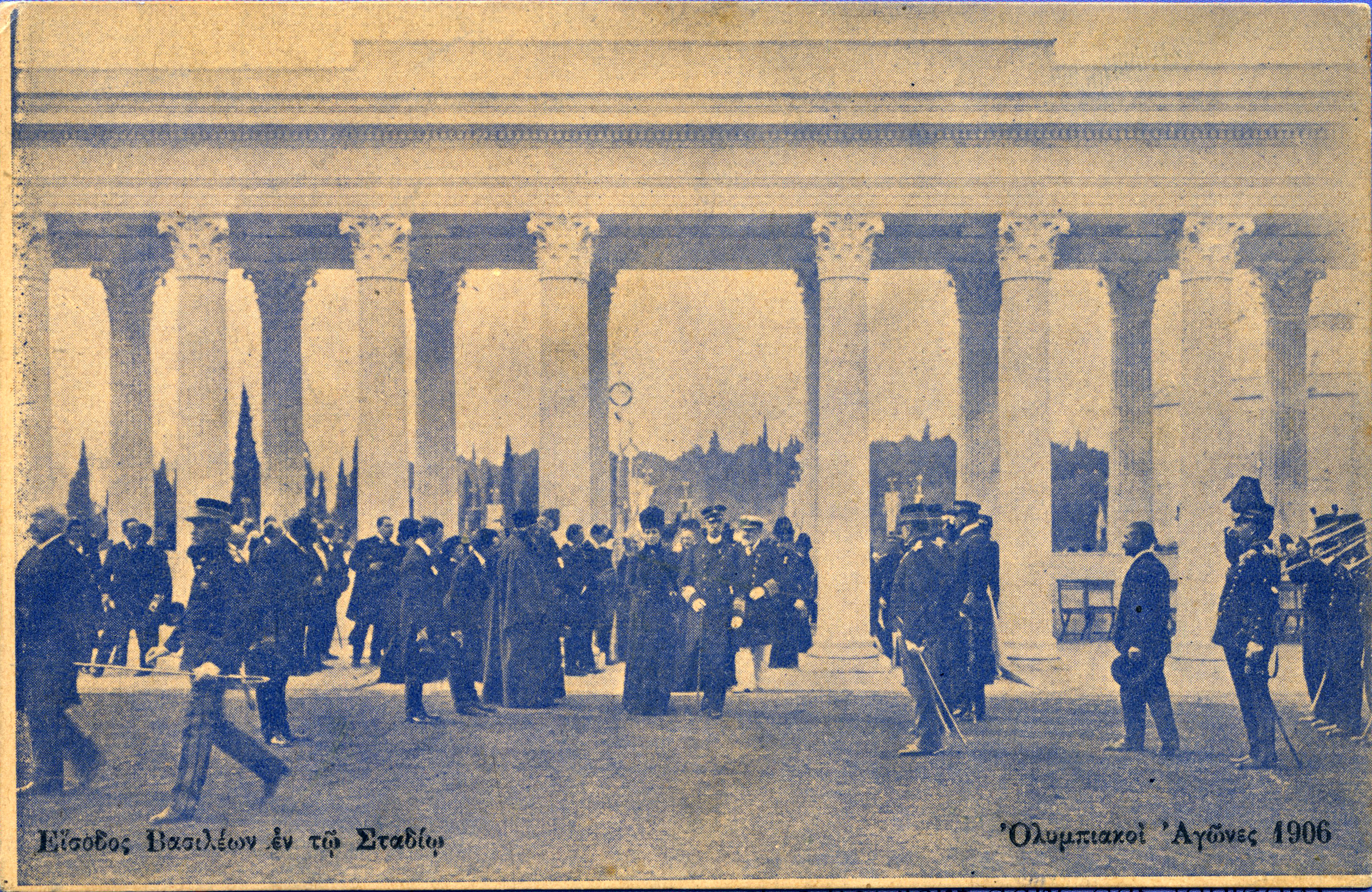
Royals enter the Stadium

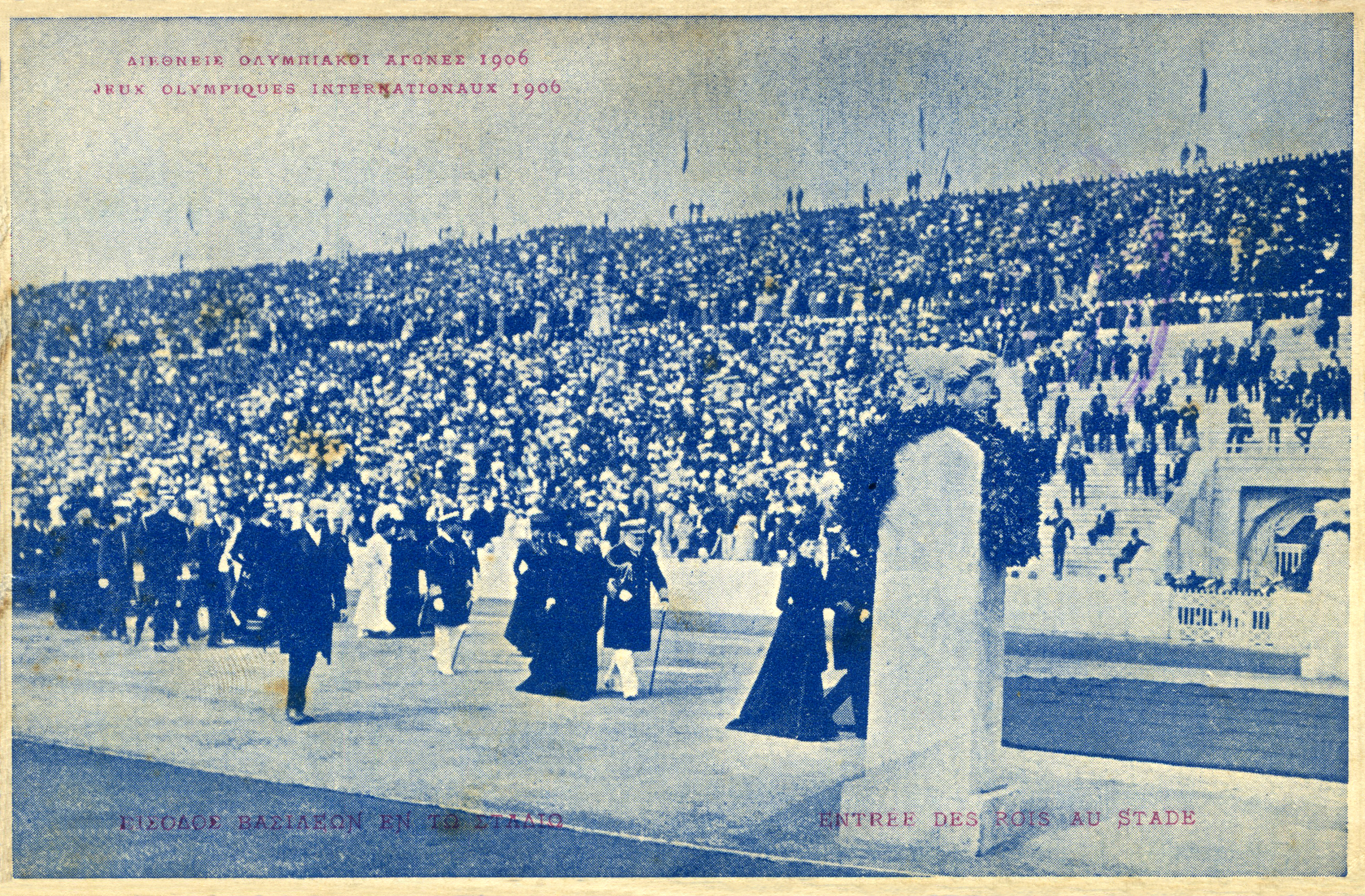
Royals enter the Stadium

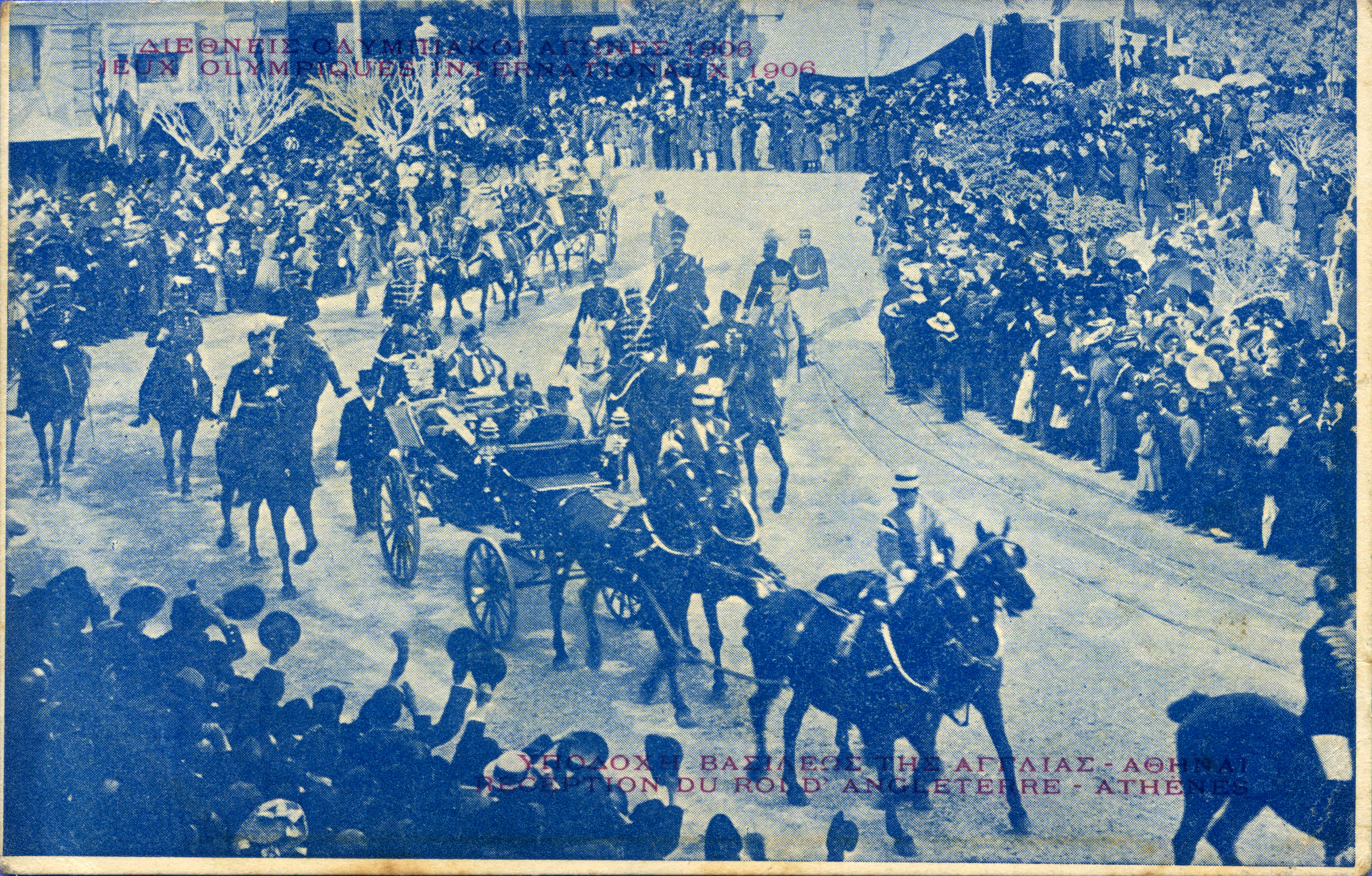
Reception of the British king

=== Highlights ===
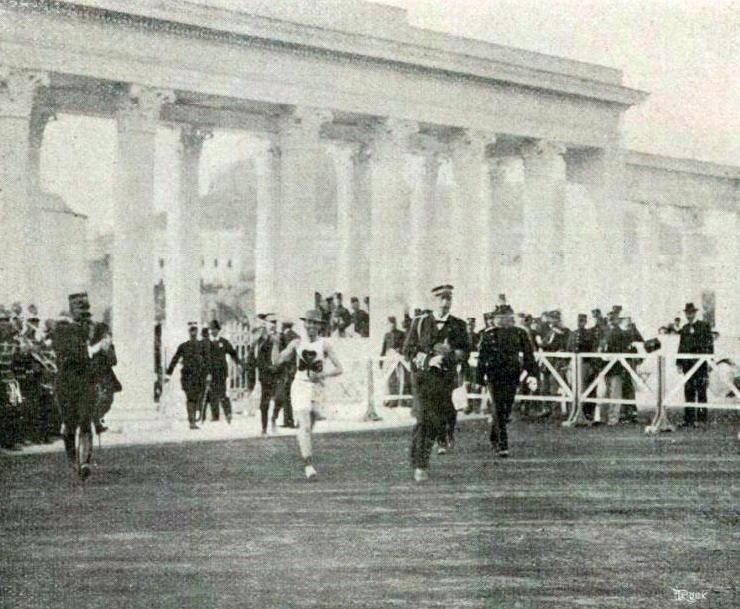
The finish of the Marathon

- There were only two standing jump events in Athens, but Ray Ewry successfully defended his titles in both of them, bringing his total up to 8 gold medals. In 1908 he would successfully defend them one last time for a total of 10 Olympic titles, a feat unparalleled until 2008 when Michael Phelps pushed his Olympic gold medal total to 14.
- Paul Pilgrim won both the 400 and 800 metres, a feat that was first repeated during Montreal 1976 by Alberto Juantorena.
- Canadian Billy Sherring lived in Greece for two months, to adjust to the local conditions. His efforts paid off as he unexpectedly won the Marathon. Prince George accompanied him on the final lap.
- Finland made its Olympic debut, and immediately won a gold medal, as Verner Järvinen won the Discus (Greek style) event.
- Peter O'Connor of Ireland won gold in the hop, step and jump (triple jump) and silver in the long jump. In protest at being put on the British team, O'Connor scaled the flagpole and hoisted the Irish flag, while the pole was guarded by Irish and American athletes and supporters.
- Martin Sheridan of the Irish American Athletic Club, competing for the U.S. team, won gold in the 16-pound Shot put and the Freestyle Discus throw and silver in the Standing high jump, Standing long jump and Stone throw. He scored the greatest number of points of any athlete at the Games. For his accomplishments he was presented with a ceremonial javelin by King Georgios I. This javelin is still on display in a local pub near Sheridan's hometown in Bohola, County Mayo, Ireland.

=== Closing ceremony ===
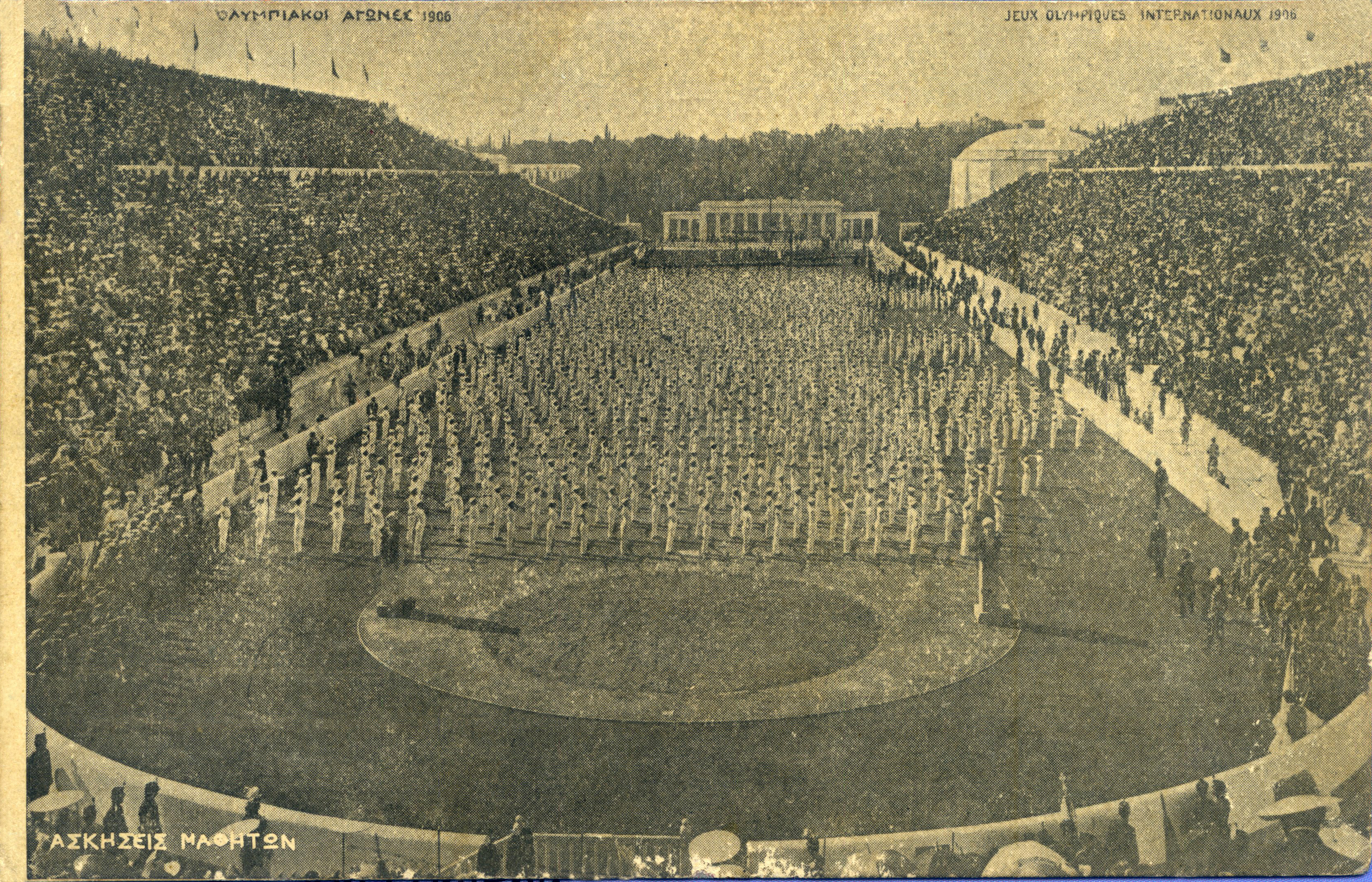
Students at Gymnastics

Six thousand schoolchildren took part in the first ever Olympic closing ceremony.

== Participating nations ==
854 athletes, 848 men and six women, from 20 countries, competed at the 1906 Intercalated Games.

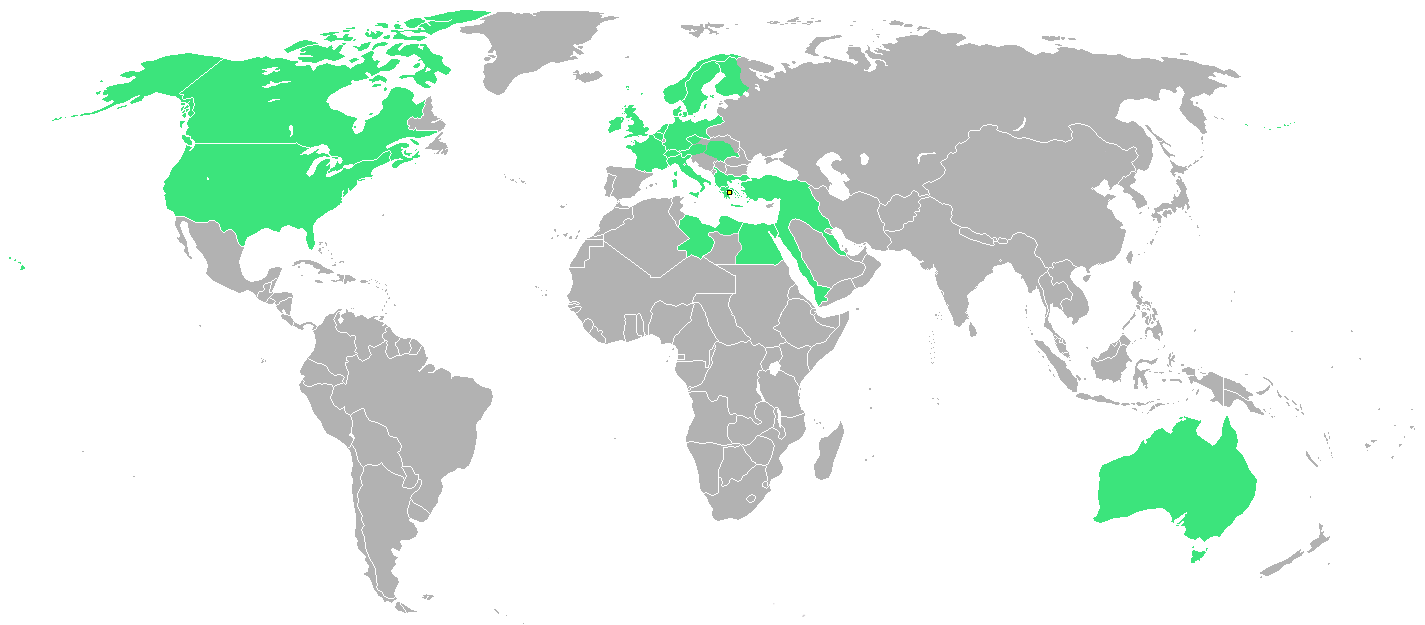
Participants of the 1906 Games

- Australia (4)
- Austria (31)
- Belgium (16)
- Bohemia (13)
- Canada (3)
- Denmark (53)
- Egypt (2)
- Finland (4) (Note: While the Grand Duchy of Finland was part of the Russian Empire at the time, it was fully self-governing; as such, it was treated as a separate country.)
- France (56)
- Germany (49)
- Great Britain (47)
- Greece (321) (host country)
- Hungary (35)
- Italy (76)
- Netherlands (16)
- Norway (32)
- (Ottoman Empire) Ottoman Turkey (2) (Note: At the time, the name "Turkey" was used to refer to the Ottoman Empire.)
- Sweden (39)
- Switzerland (9)
- United States (38)
- Mixed team (14)

== The Games ==
78 events in 14 disciplines, comprising 12 sports, were part of the 1906 Games.

- Aquatics
  - Diving (1)
  - Swimming (4)
- Athletics (21)
- Cycling
  - Road (1)
  - Track (5)
- Fencing (8)
- Football (1)
- Gymnastics (4)
- Rowing (6)
- Shooting (16)
- Tennis (4)
- Tug of war (1)
- Weightlifting (2)
- Wrestling (4)

Pistol dueling was an unofficial event.

== Medal count ==
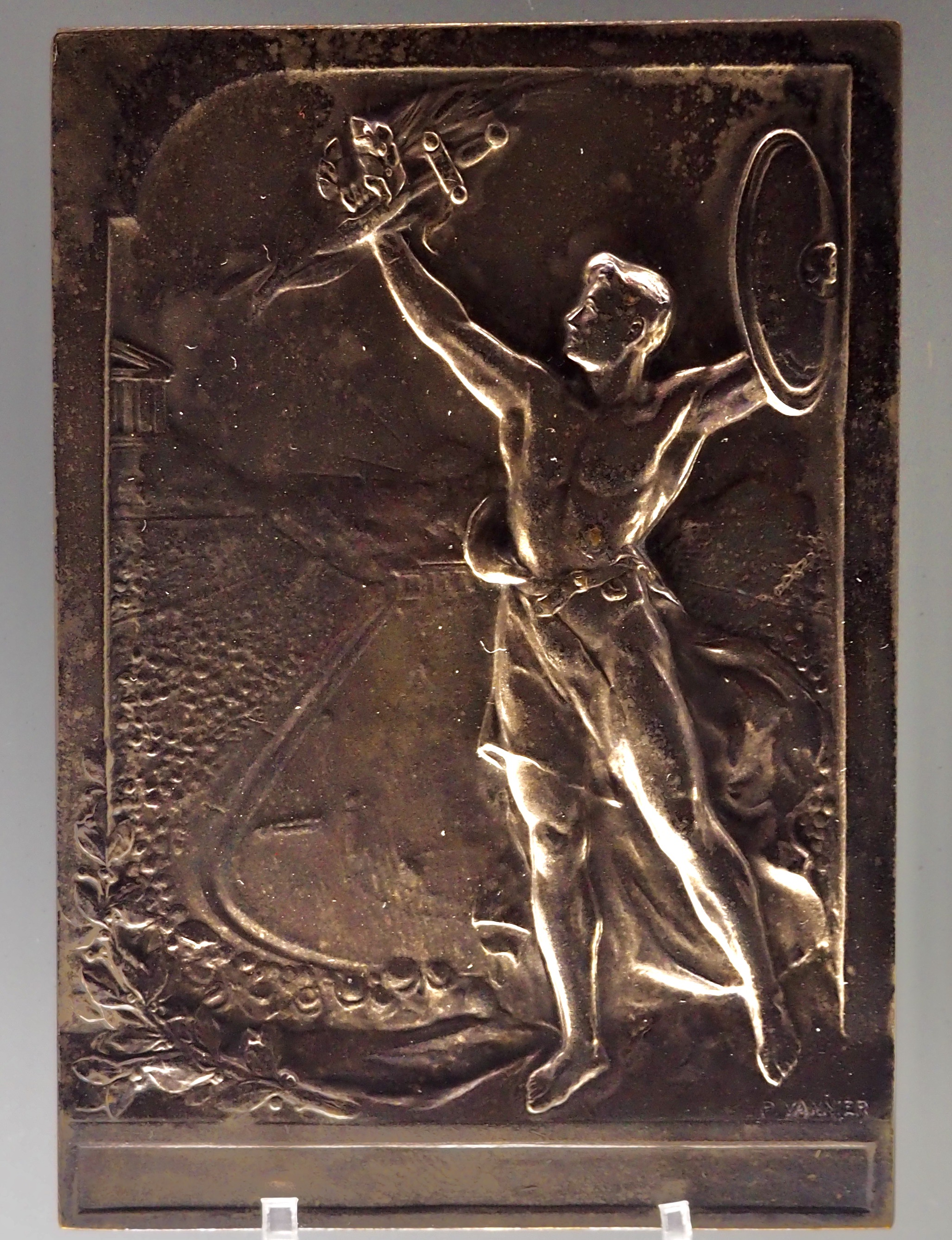
Commemorative plaque for the 1906 Intercalated Games, designed by P. Vannier, from the Numismatic Museum, Athens

These medals were distributed but are no longer recognized by the International Olympic Committee.

* Host nation (Greece)

Rank	Nation	Gold	Silver	Bronze	Total
1	France	15	9	16	40
2	United States	12	6	6	24
3	Greece	8	13	13	34
4	Great Britain	8	11	5	24
5	Italy	7	6	3	16
6	Germany	4	6	5	15
7	Switzerland	4	3	1	8
8	Austria	3	3	3	9
9	Denmark	3	2	1	6
10	Sweden	2	5	7	14
11	Hungary	2	5	3	10
12	Belgium	2	1	3	6
13	Finland	2	1	1	4
14	Canada	1	1	0	2
14	Norway	1	1	0	2
16	Mixed team	0	2	0	2
17	Netherlands	0	1	2	3
18	Australia	0	0	3	3
19	Bohemia	0	0	2	2
Totals (19 entries)		74	76	74	224

=== Notes ===
- The mixed team medals are for two Belgians and one Greek in the Coxed Pairs 1 mile rowing event and for the football team of Smyrna (see below).
- In the football tournament, the silver medal for the team from Smyrna was won by a mixed team of footballers from various nationalities (English, French and Armenian), while the bronze medal for the team from Thessalonica was won by ethnic Greeks who competed for Greece, despite both cities being Ottoman possessions at the time.
- Egypt and Turkey (Ottoman Empire) were the only countries that competed but did not win medals.

== Decline of the Intercalated Games ==
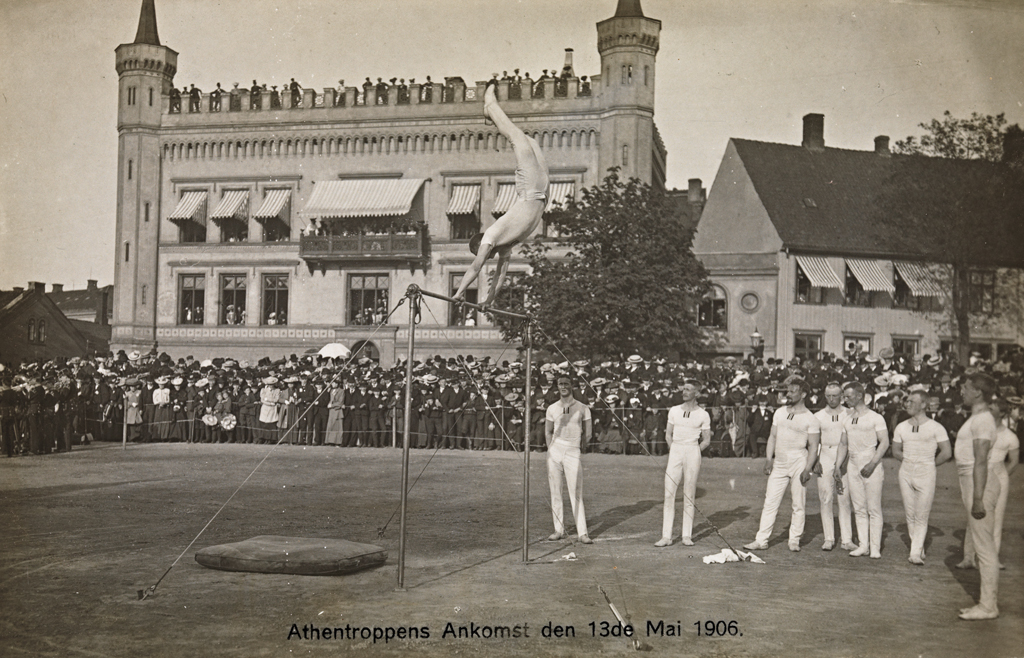
On the high bar, 1906

The Greeks were, despite their best efforts, unable to keep the schedule for 1910. While there had been serious political tensions in the Balkans, the modern Greeks found out their ancient ancestors were right: a two-year interval was too short. There had been effectively a gap of six years before Athens 1906, due to the predominantly American nature of the 1904 St. Louis Games, but Athens 1910 would have left a gap of two years after the 1908 London Games, which would have made it virtually impossible to prepare.

With Athens 1910 being a failure, the faith in the Intercalated Games diminished: as a result, plans for Athens 1914 got even less support before the outbreak of World War I, meaning any further Intercalated Games had to wait until after the war, which ended in 1918.

Since it had been twelve years since Athens 1906, and in any case, the next possible event would have been in 1922 – sixteen years after the first – the idea of Intercalated Games was given up entirely.

=== Downgrading ===
Since the 2nd International Olympic Games in Athens had become an exception, the personal views of various IOC chairmen caused the IOC to retroactively downgrade the 1906 Games, and their explanation for the Games became that they had been a 10th anniversary celebration.

Also, more stress was placed on the continuing sequence of four-year Olympiads, and the Games of 1906 did not fit into this. Hence, the IOC currently does not recognise Athens 1906 as Olympic Games, and does not regard any events occurring there (such as the setting of new records or the winning of medals) as official.

Despite this, the success of Athens 1906 may have been what kept the Olympics alive after the failures of 1900 and 1904. The larger success of the Games as a whole is that it essentially established the Olympic campaign for the extended future. As the next Games are always built on the successes of the last, the innovations of Athens were used again in London, and eventually became Olympic tradition.

In fact, the influence of the First Intercalated Games pervades the Olympics, with the holding of the Games concentrated in a small time period in a small area returning to the first Games, while some later Games lasted for months. In the book Foundations of Managing British Olympics the authors Alex Gillett and Kevin Tennent note that this event in 1906 was extremely important in facilitating the subsequent hosting of the 1908 Olympics in London instead of Rome. (see also 1896 Summer Olympics, which lasted 11 days; see also List of Olympic Games host cities)

In the 21st century the 1906 Olympics are sometimes called the "lost" or "forgotten" Games. Despite its exclusion from other Games, it was noted as a well organized, dignified event, full pageantry, and for introducing the almost theatrical opening and closing ceremonies, which was further refined by the 1908 Games.

== Postcards for the 1906 Olympics ==
A number of postcards, then at its peak, were published by various print-houses. The following were printed in Corfu, Greece, by the Aspiotis brothers.

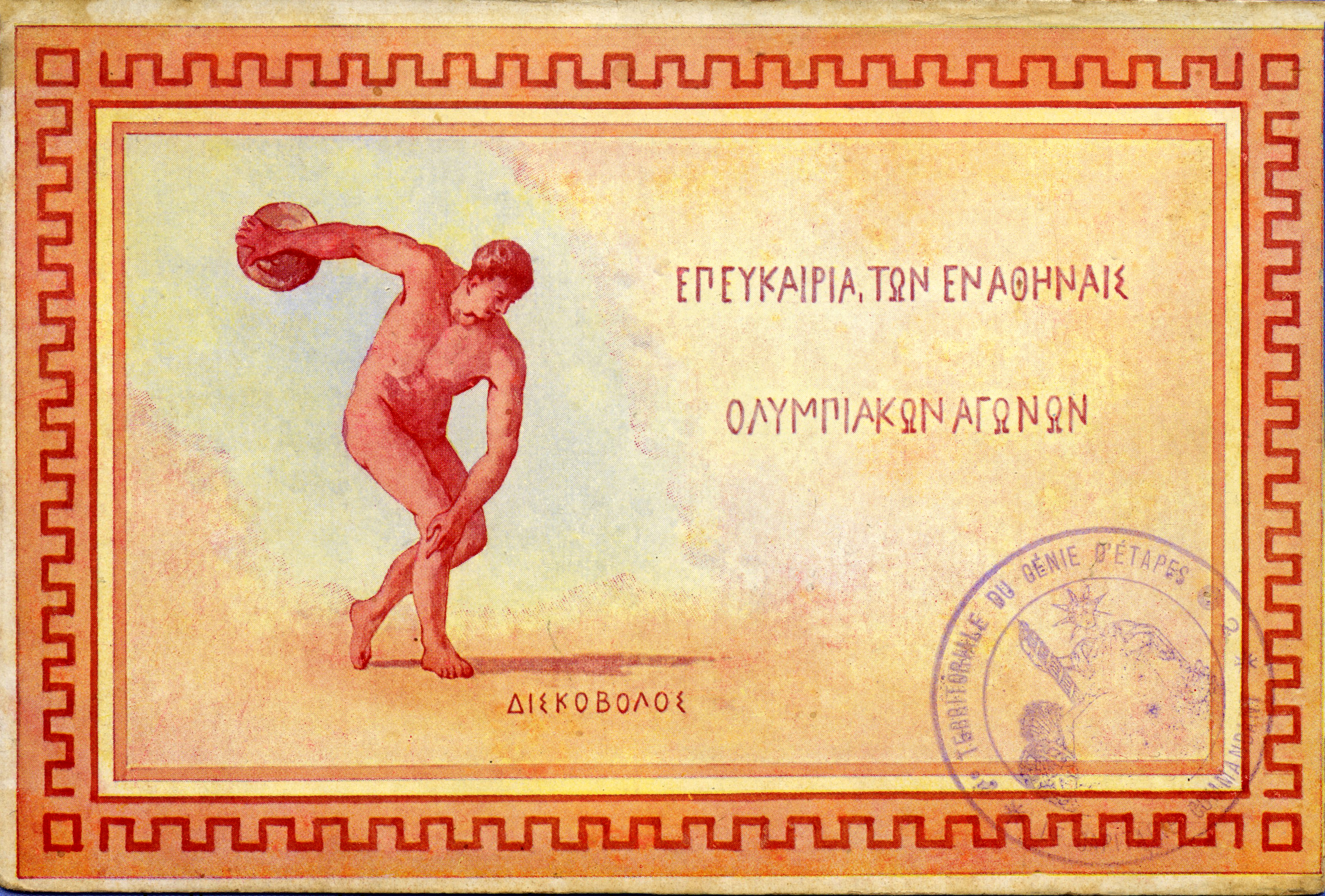
Disc thrower

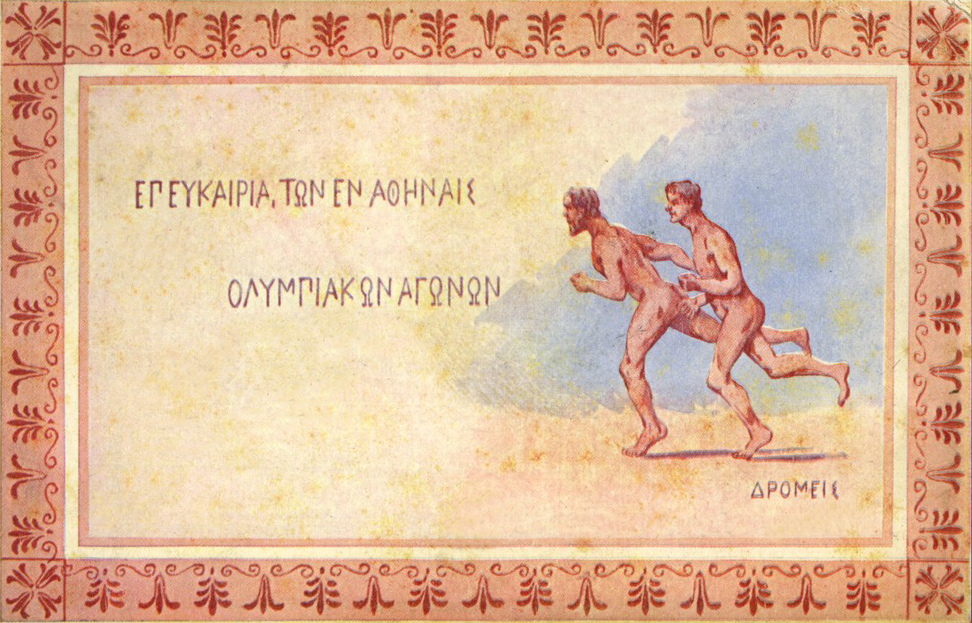
Runners

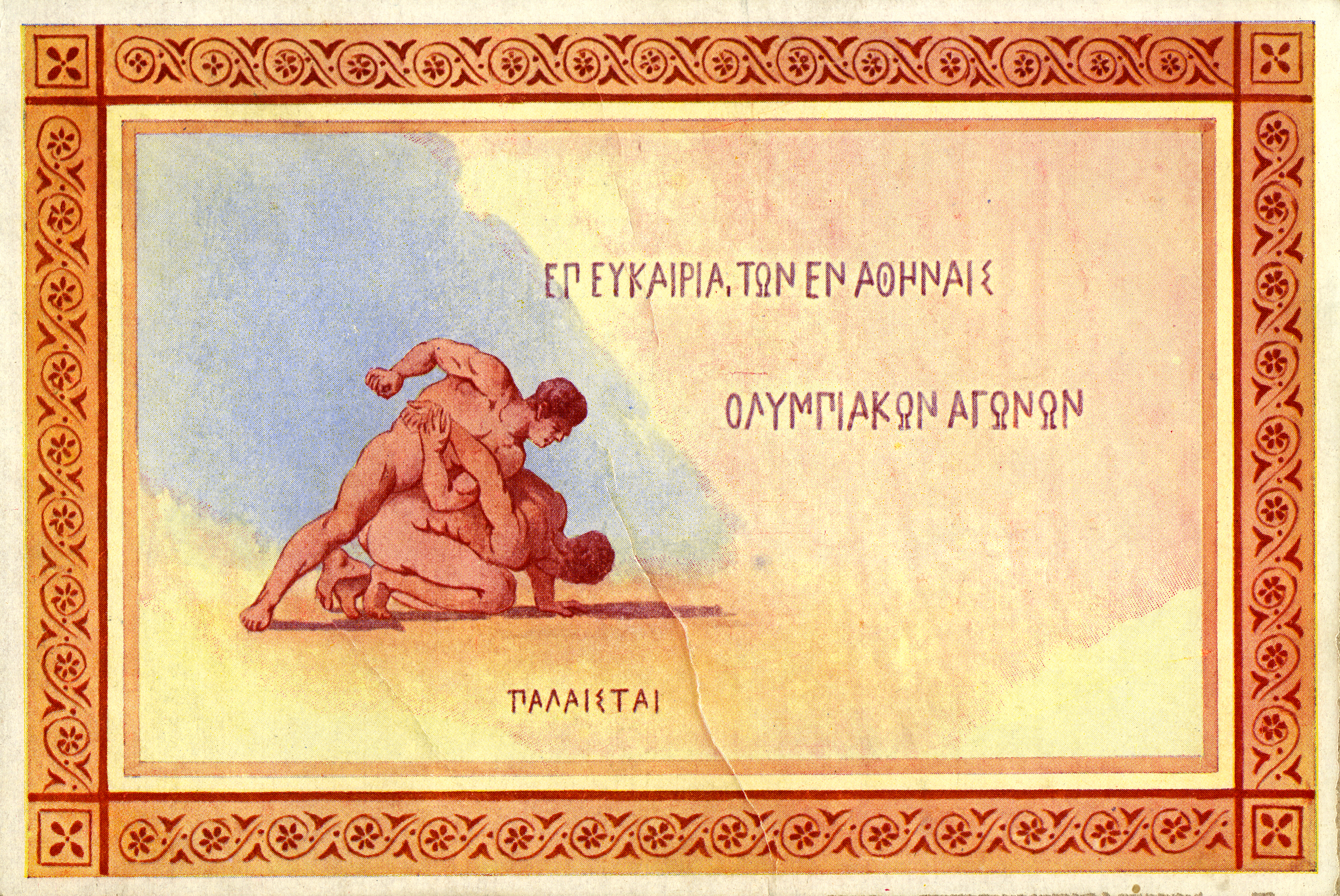
Wrestlers

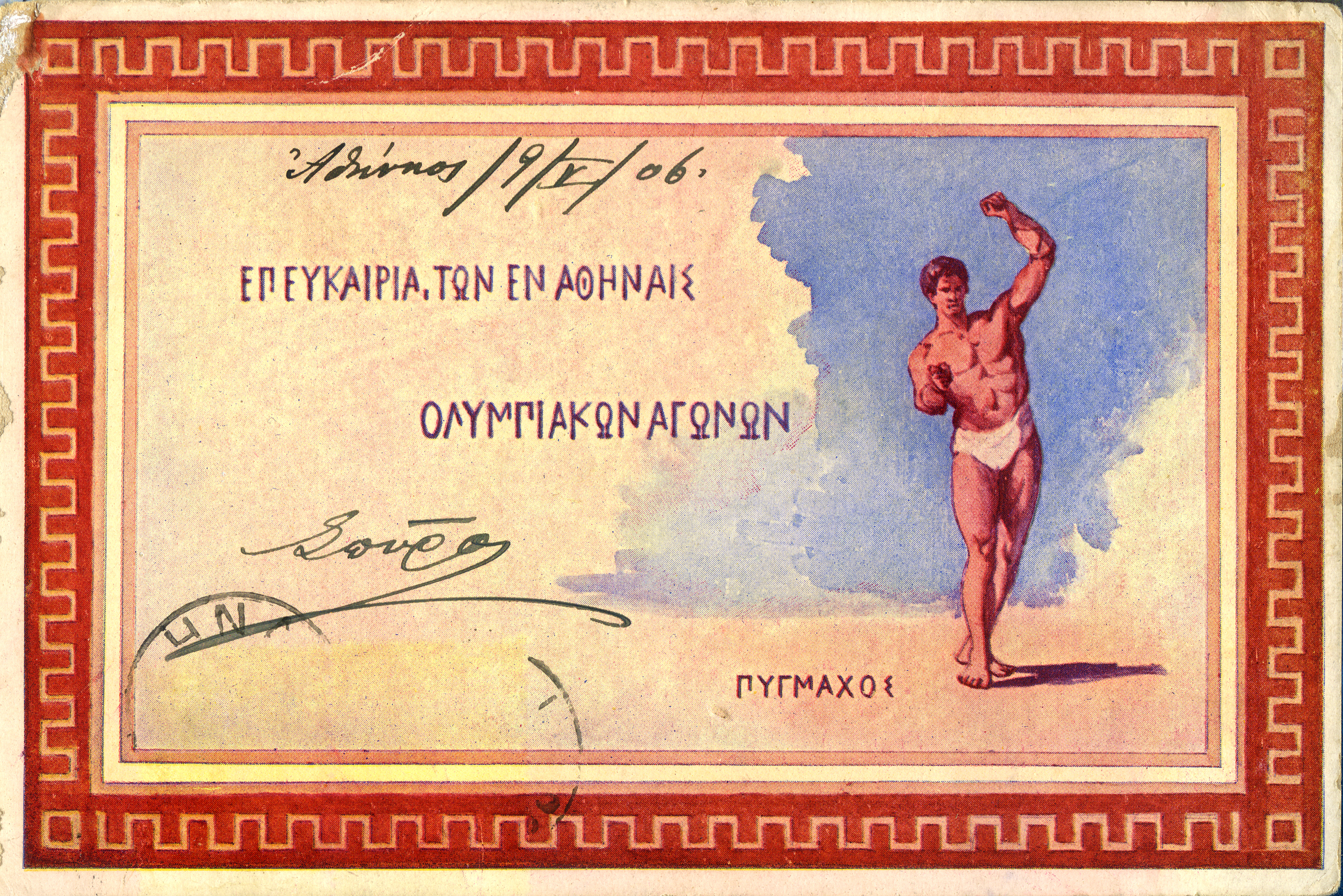
Boxer

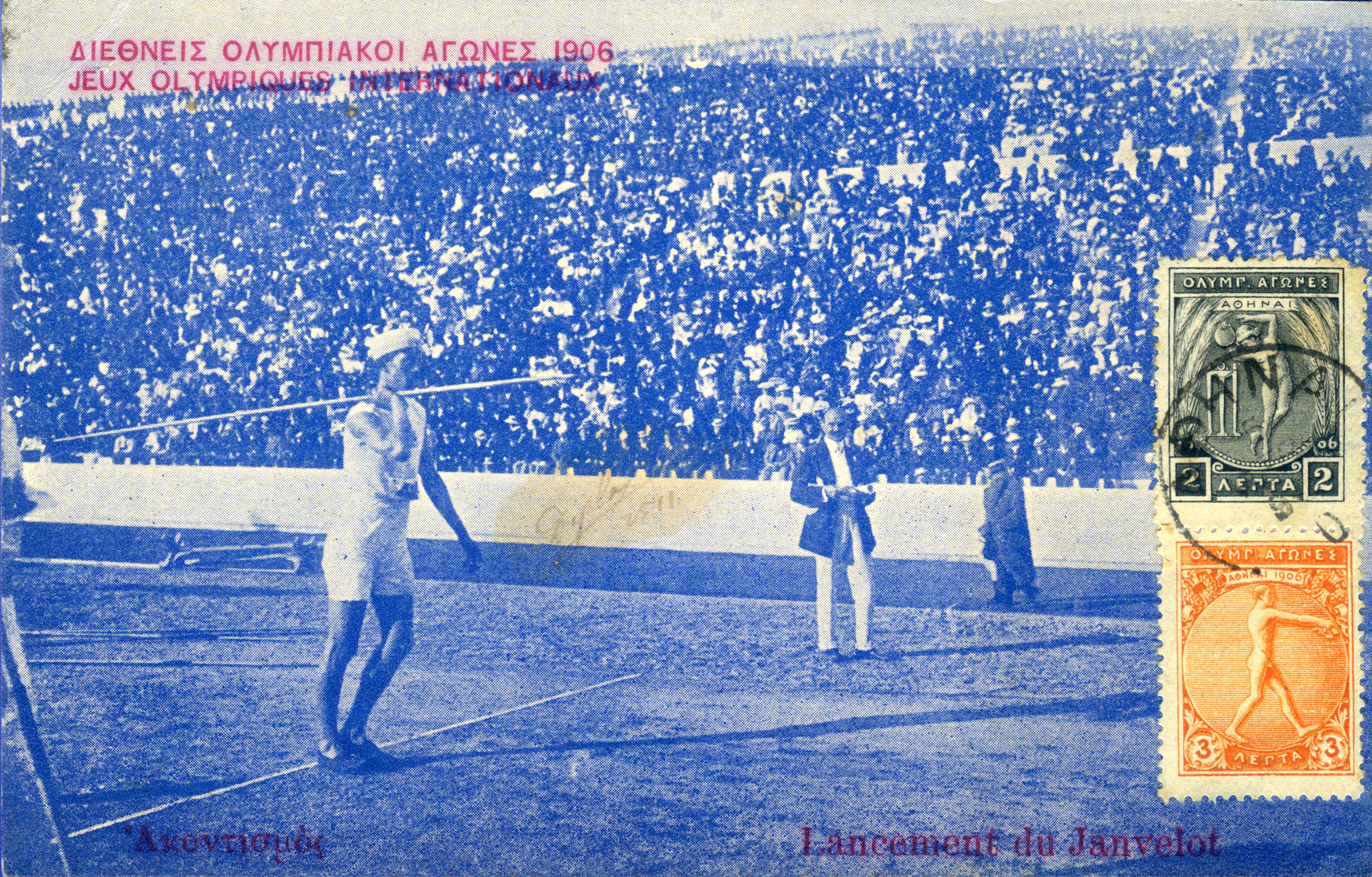
Javelin

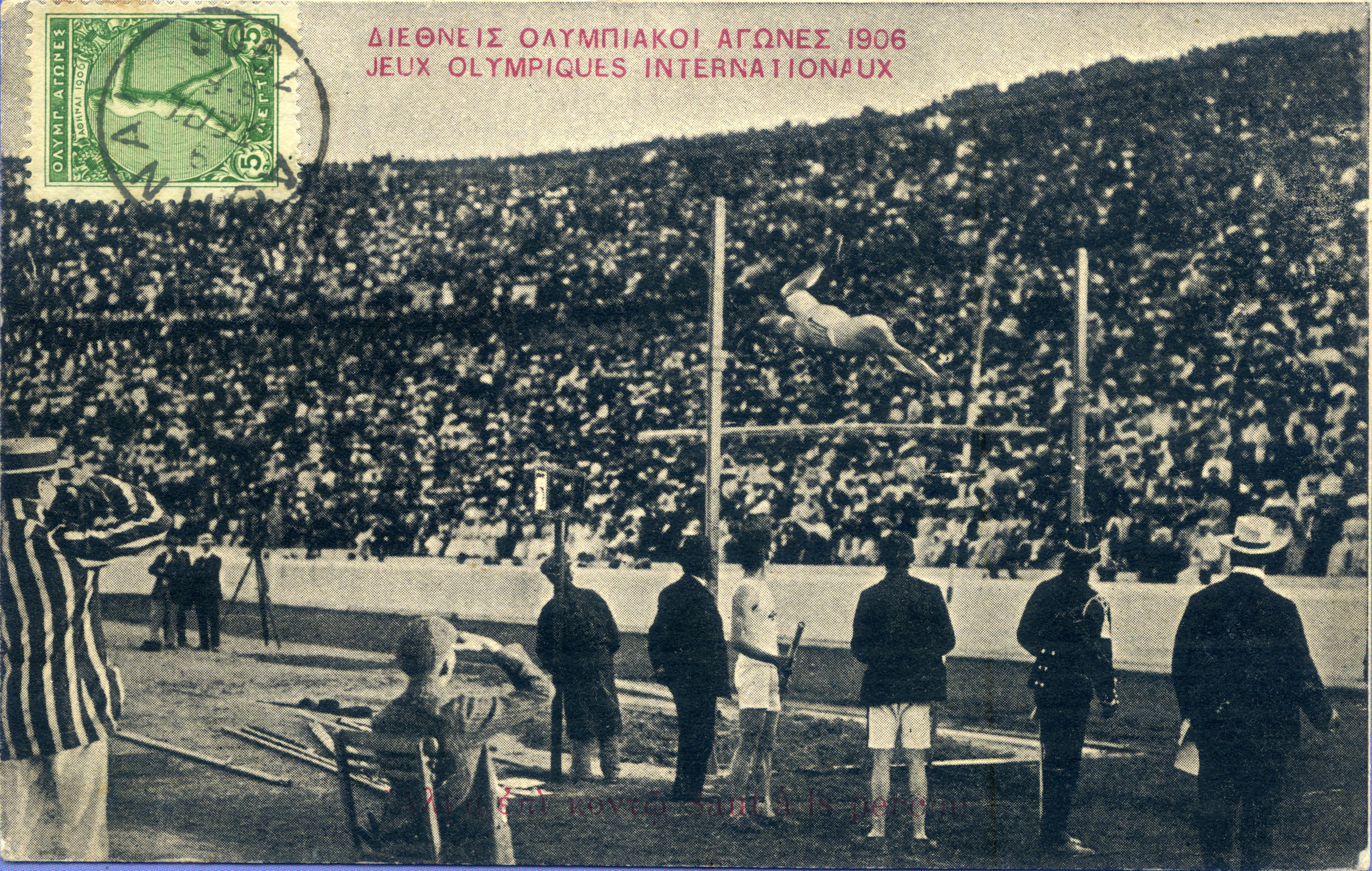
Pole vault

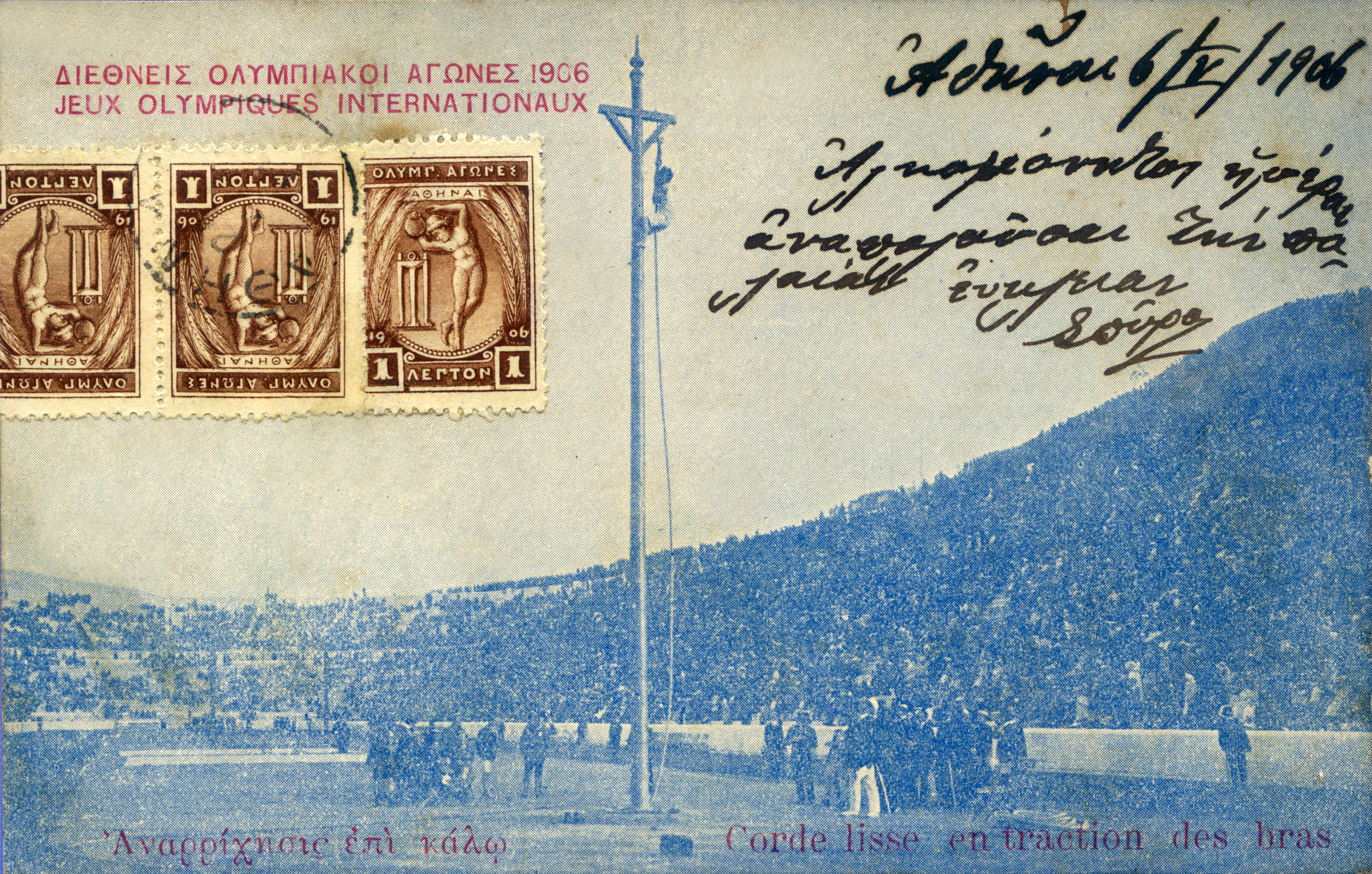
Rope climbing

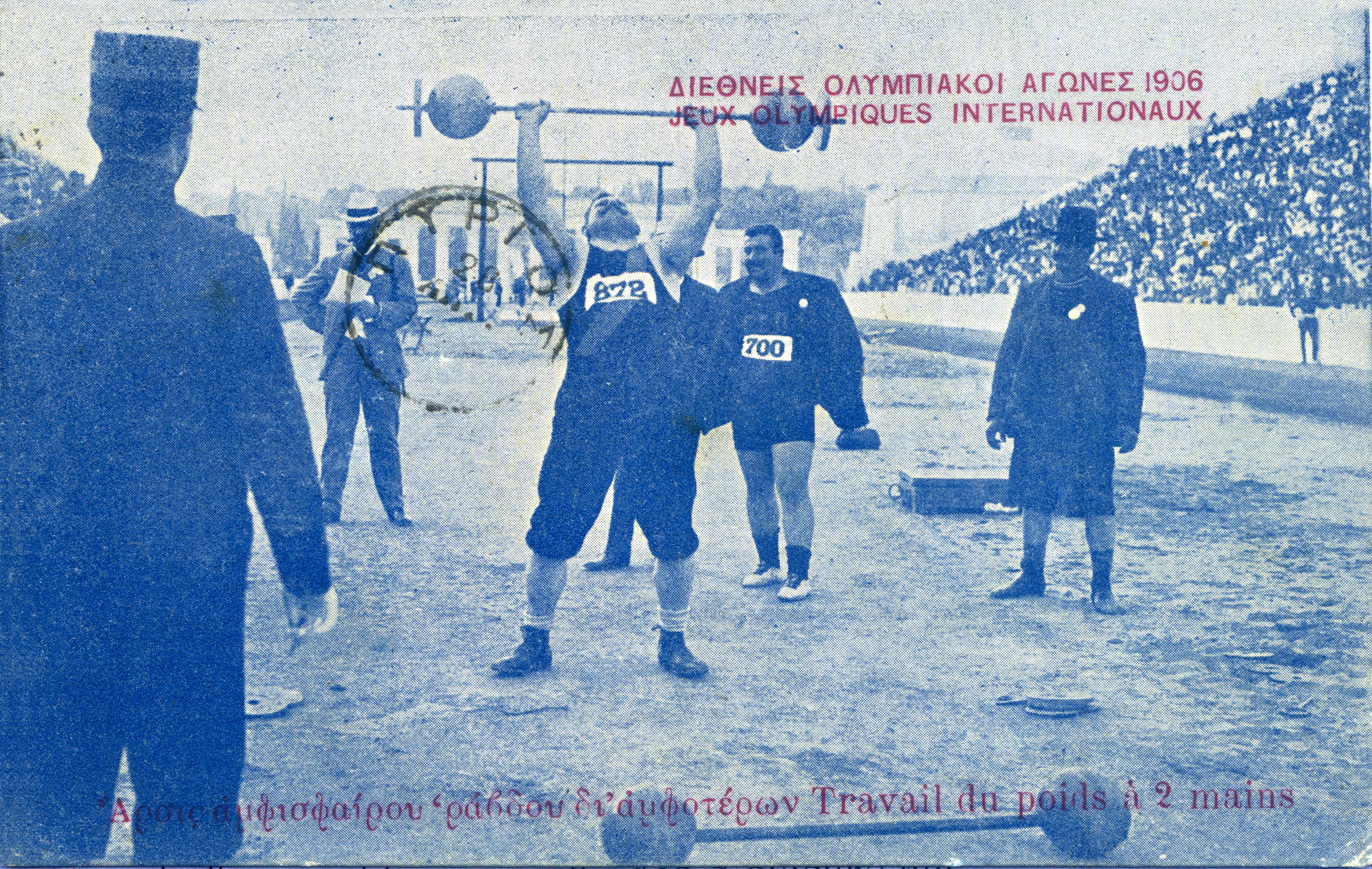
Bar bell lifting with 2 hands

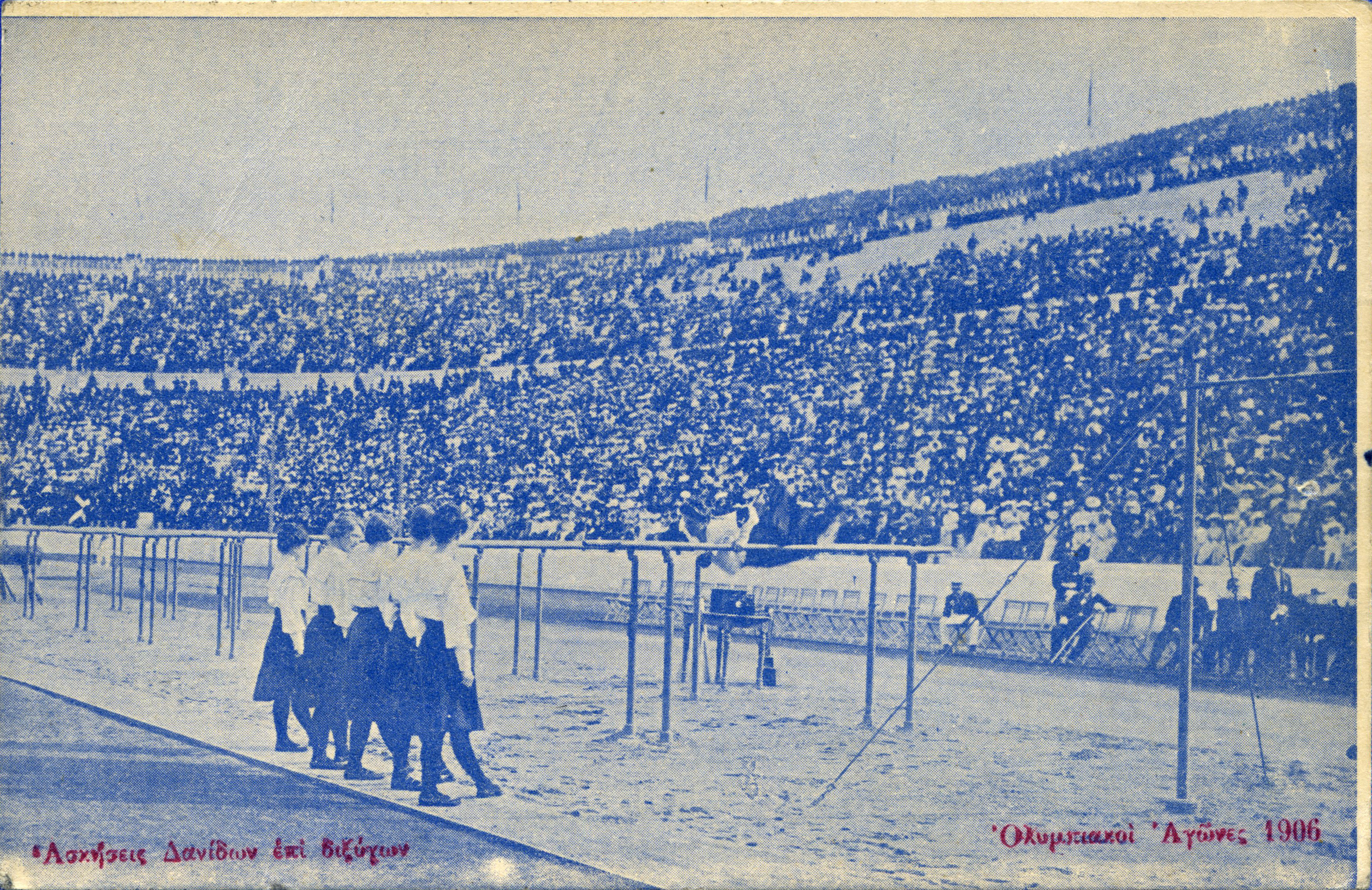
Danes at Gymnastics

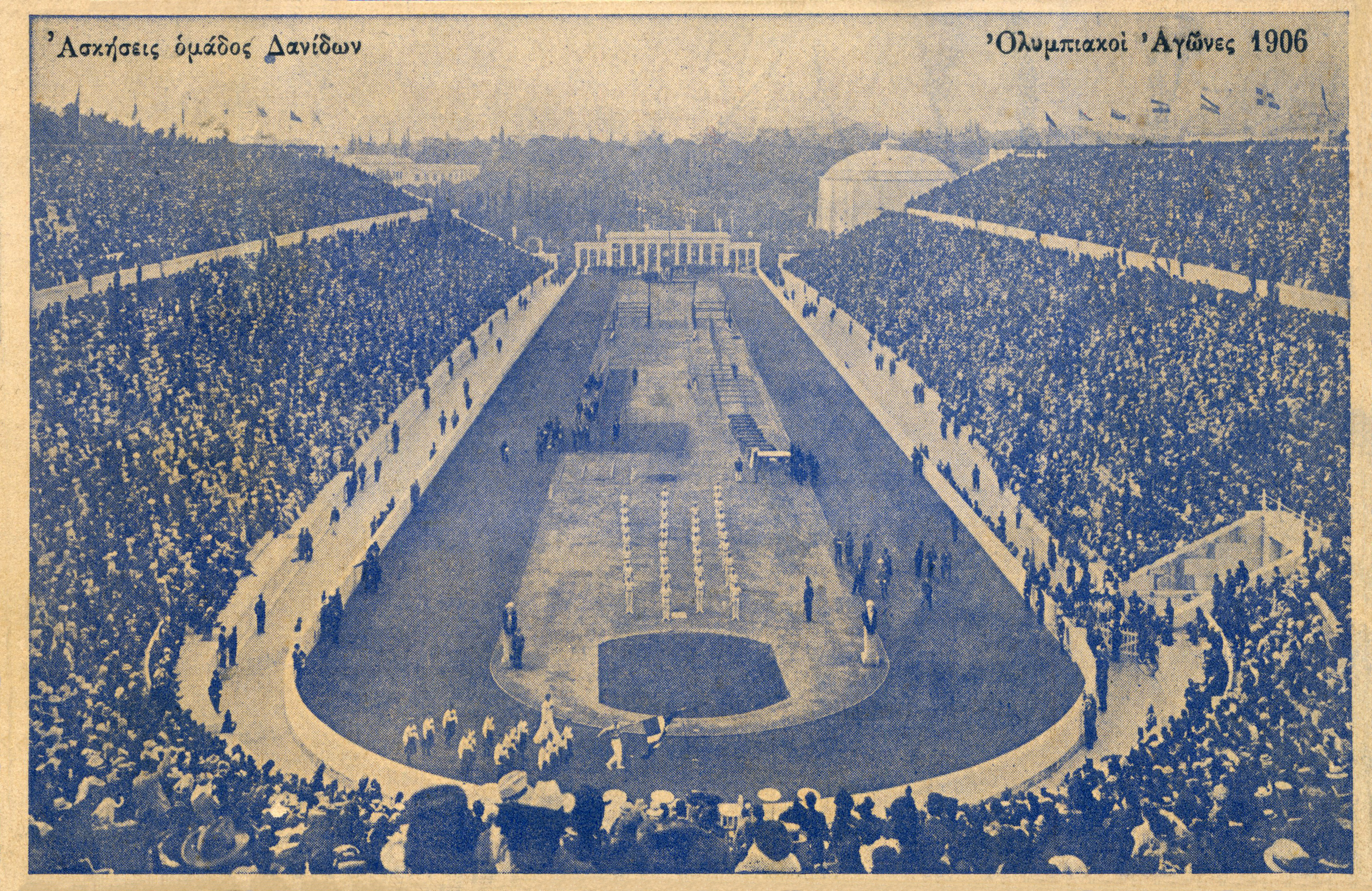
Danes at Gymnastics

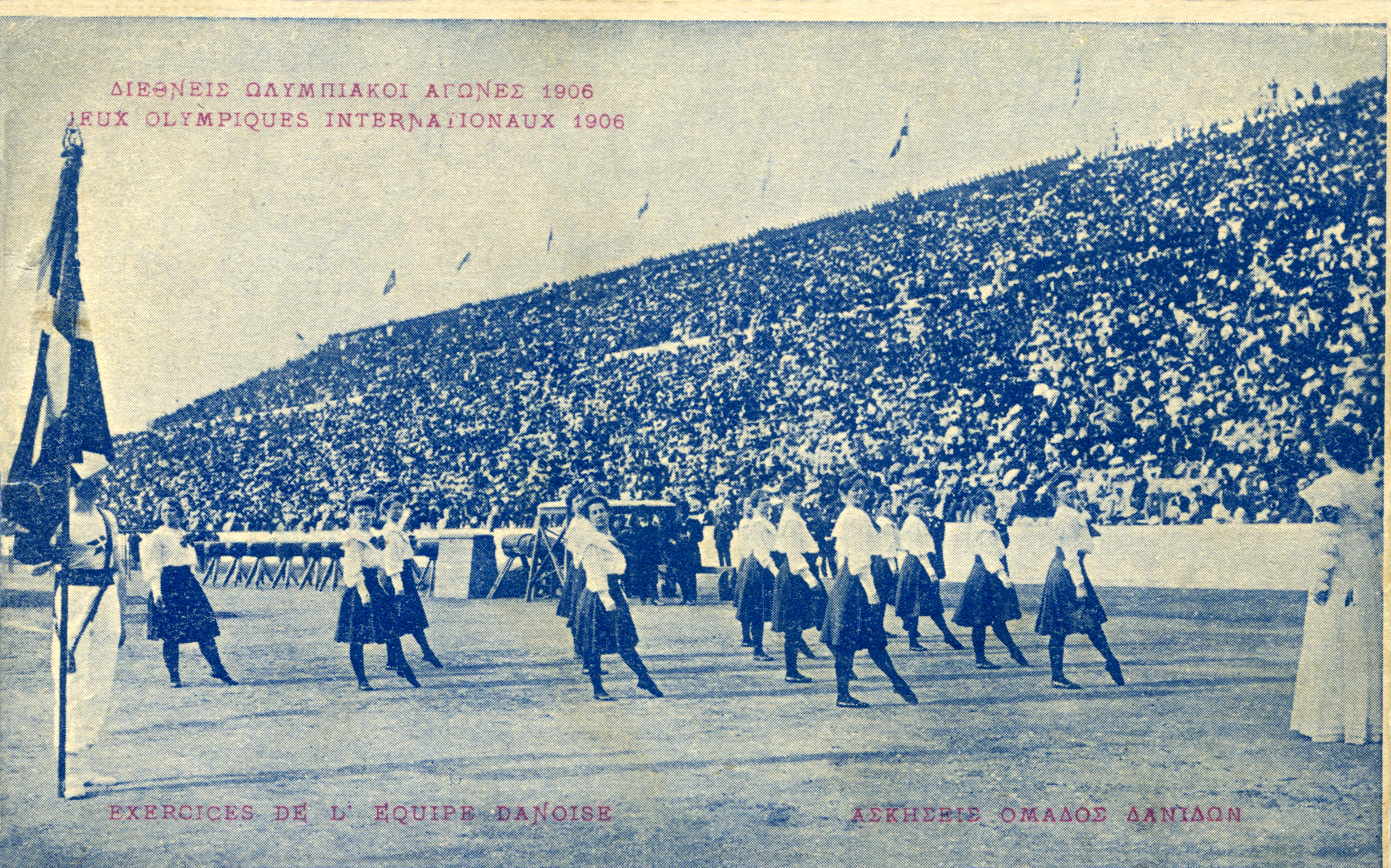
Danes at Gymnastics

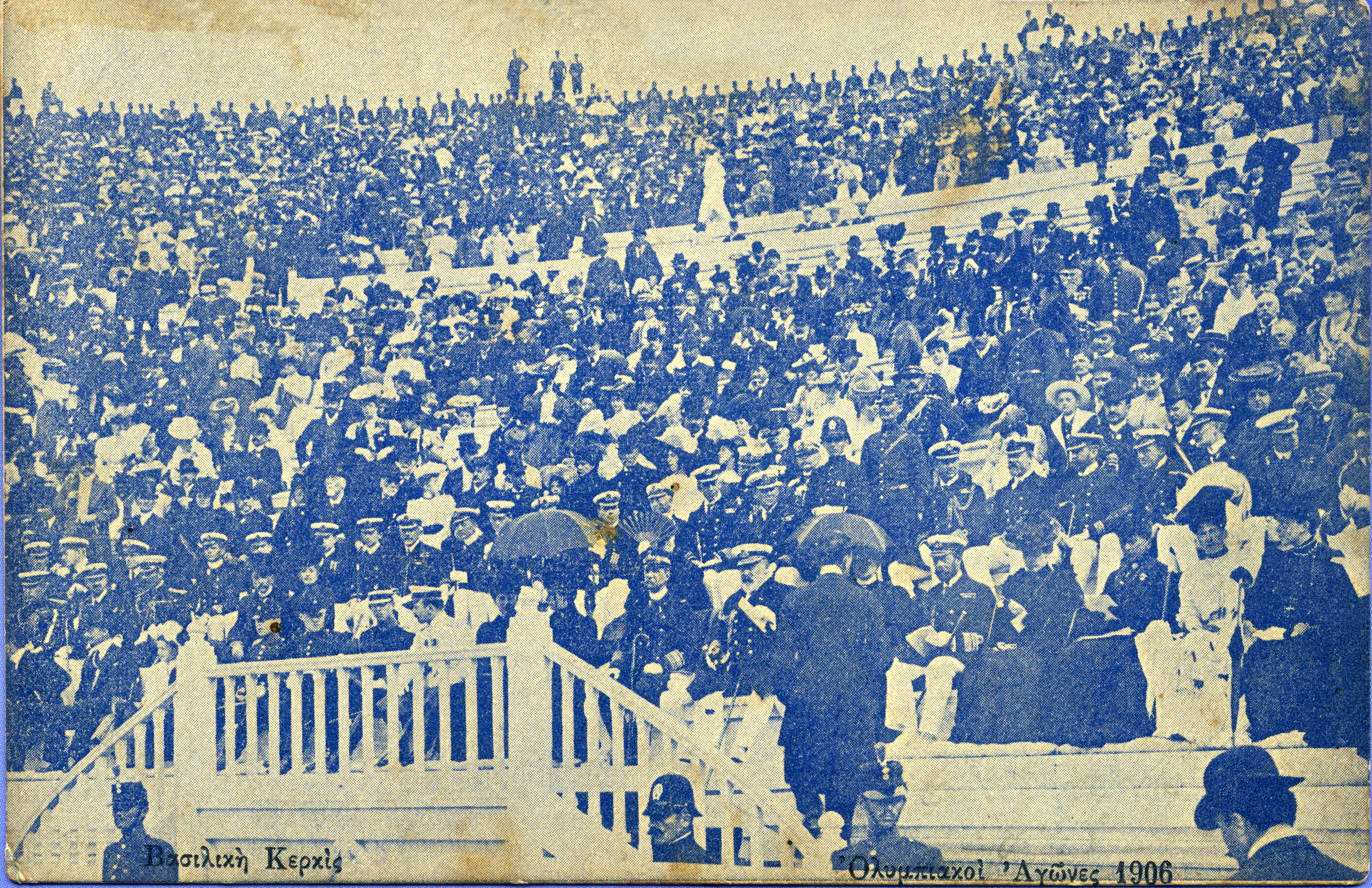
Royal stand

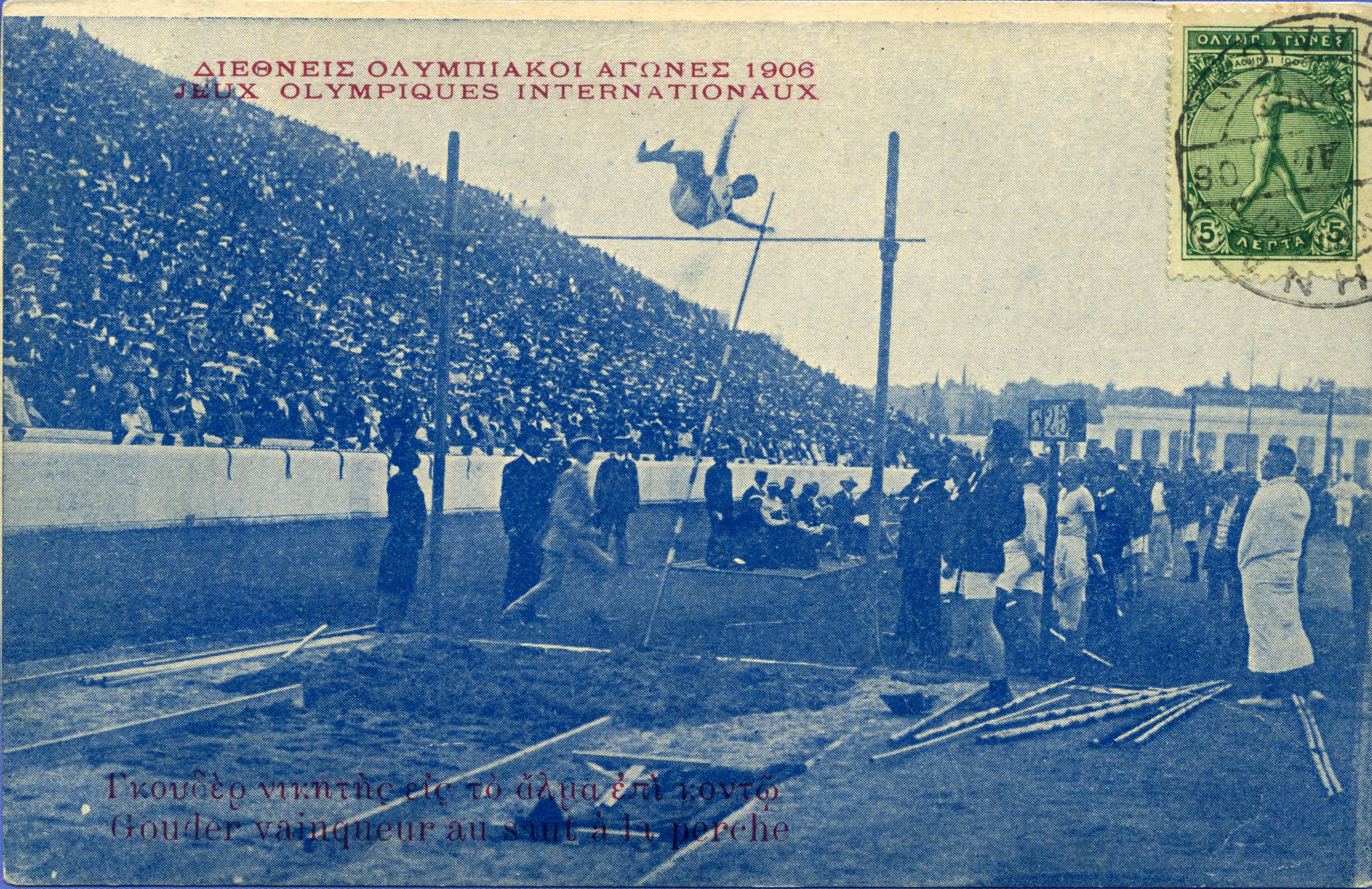
Pole vault winner Gonder

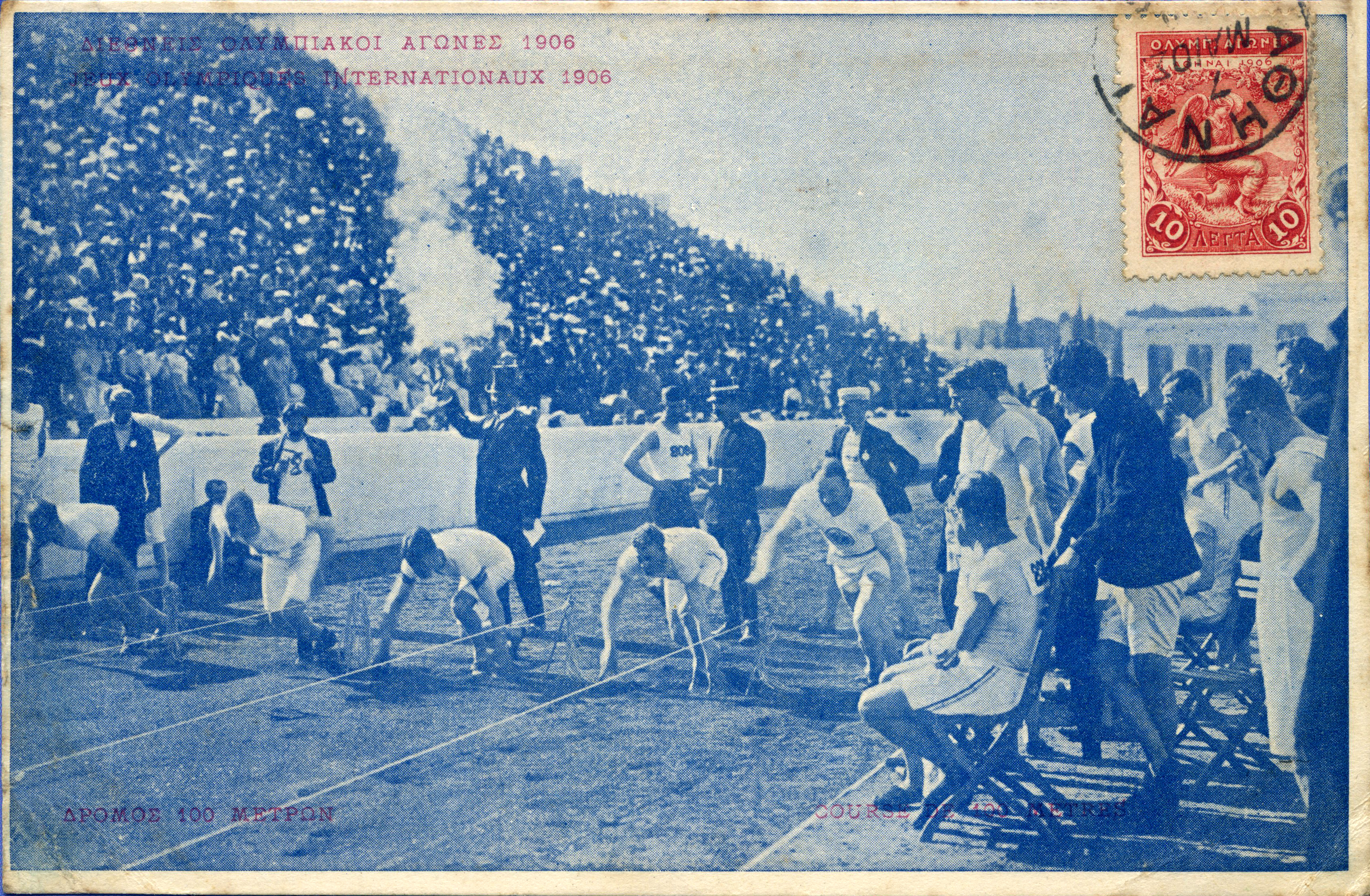
100 metres run

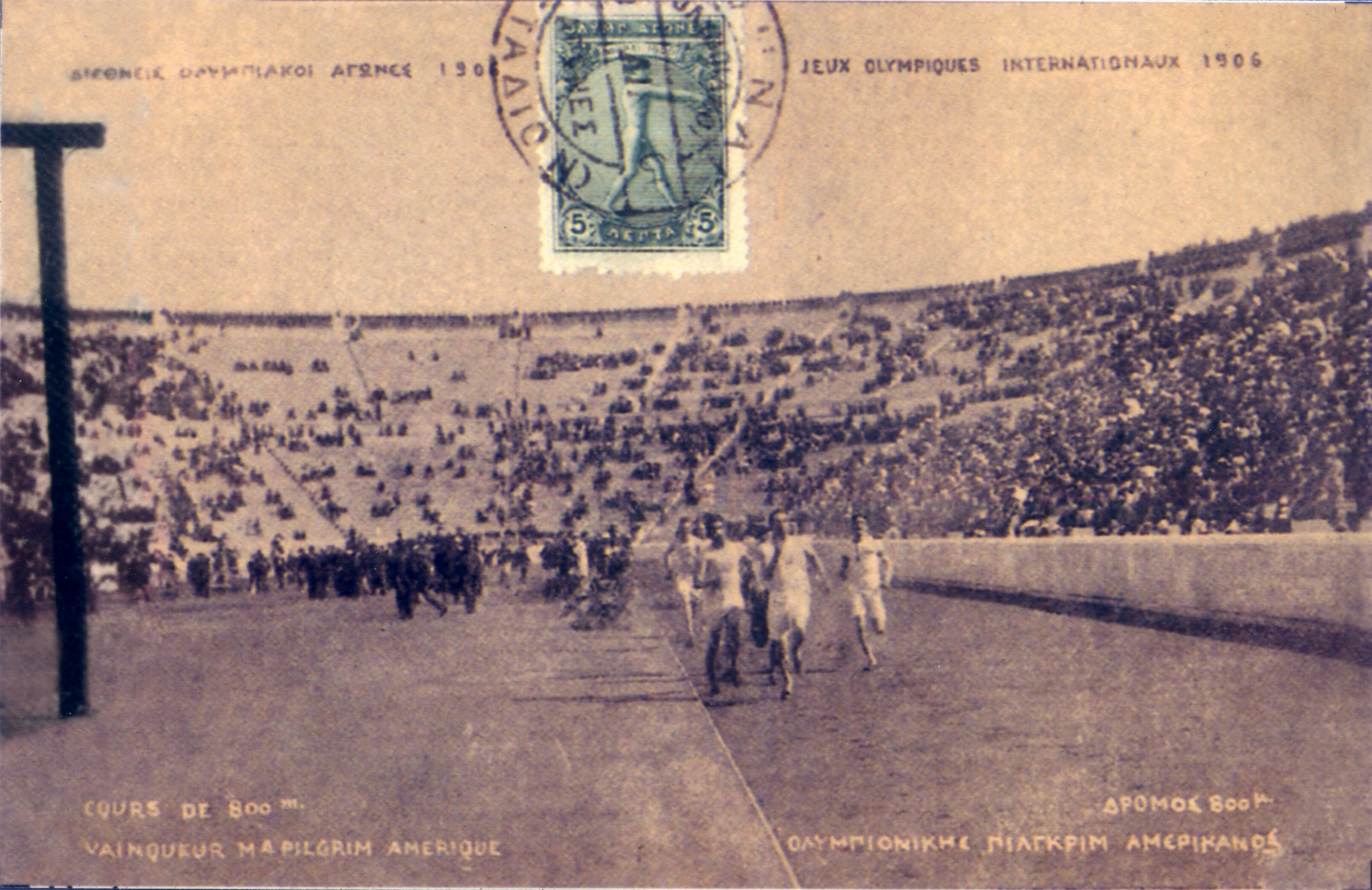
800 metres run. Winner Pilgrim

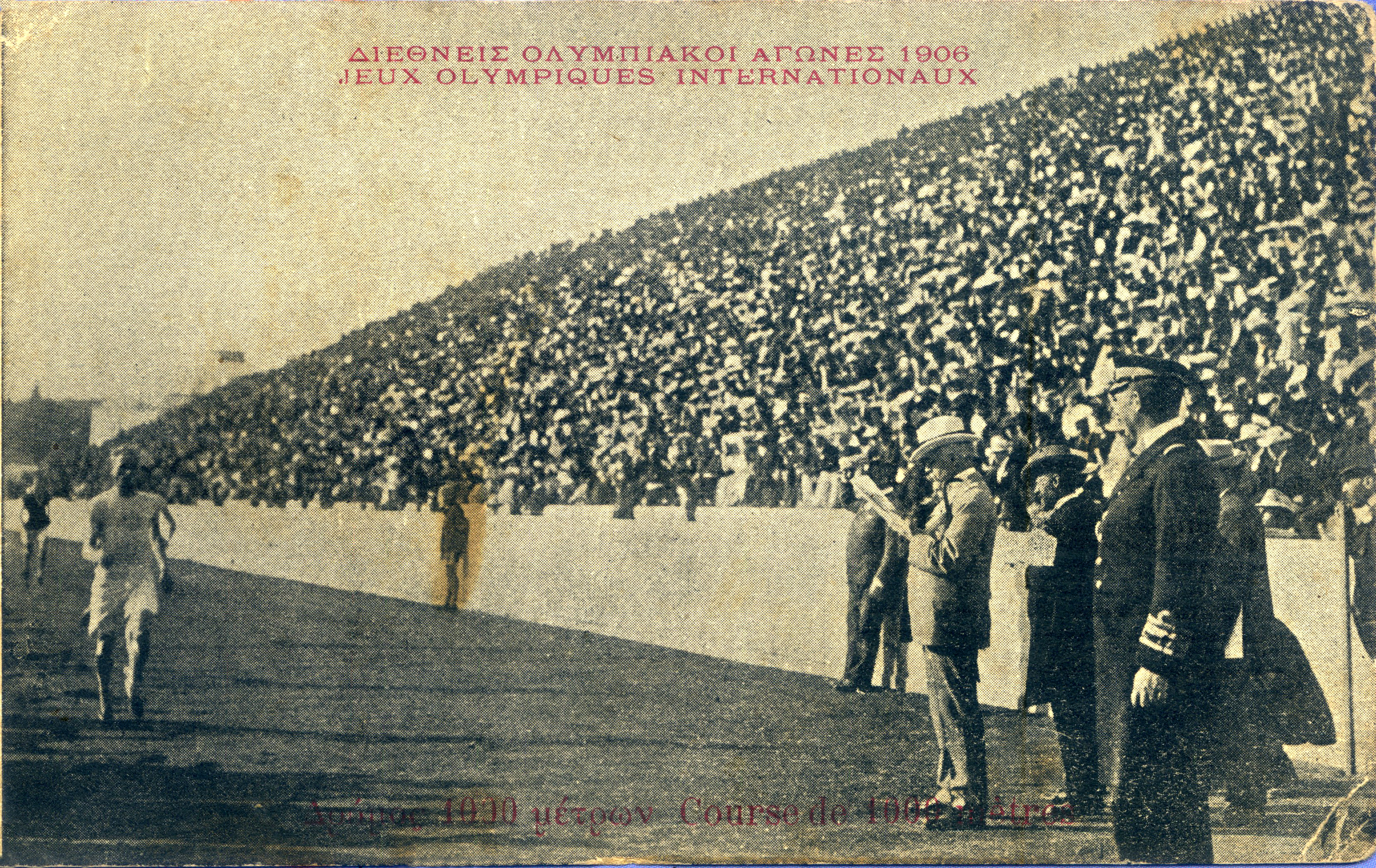
1000 metres run

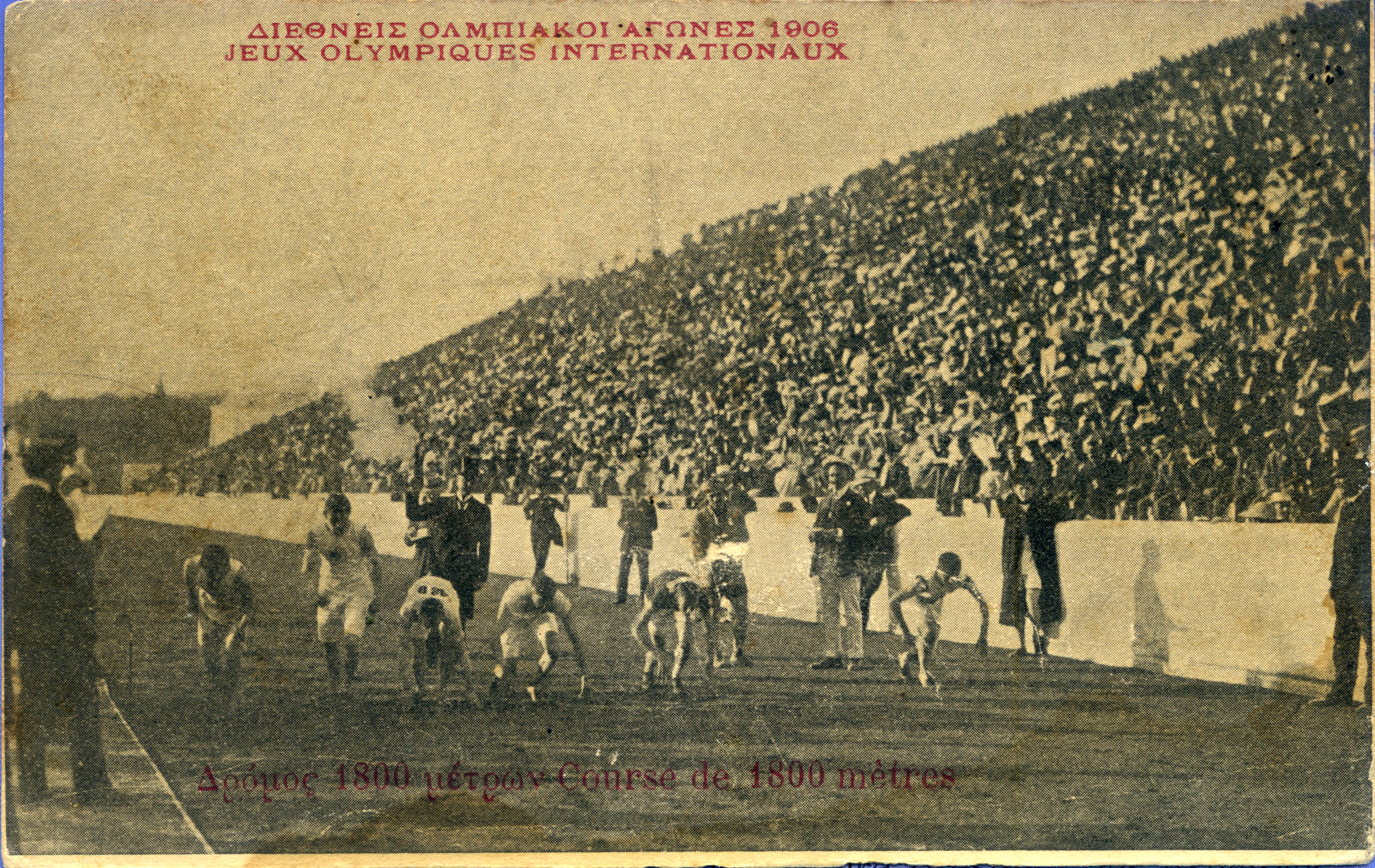
1500 metres run

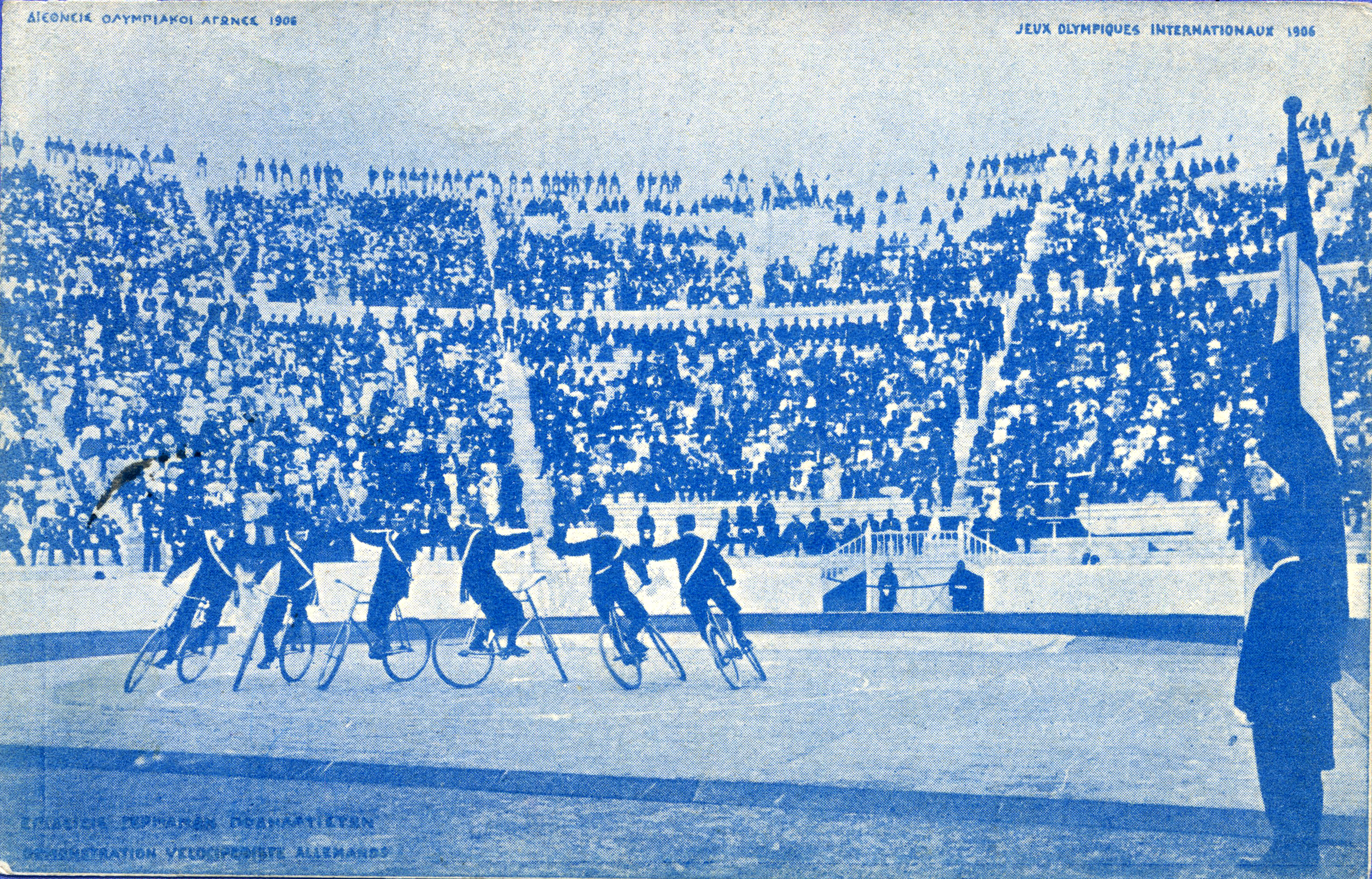
Demonstration of German cyclists

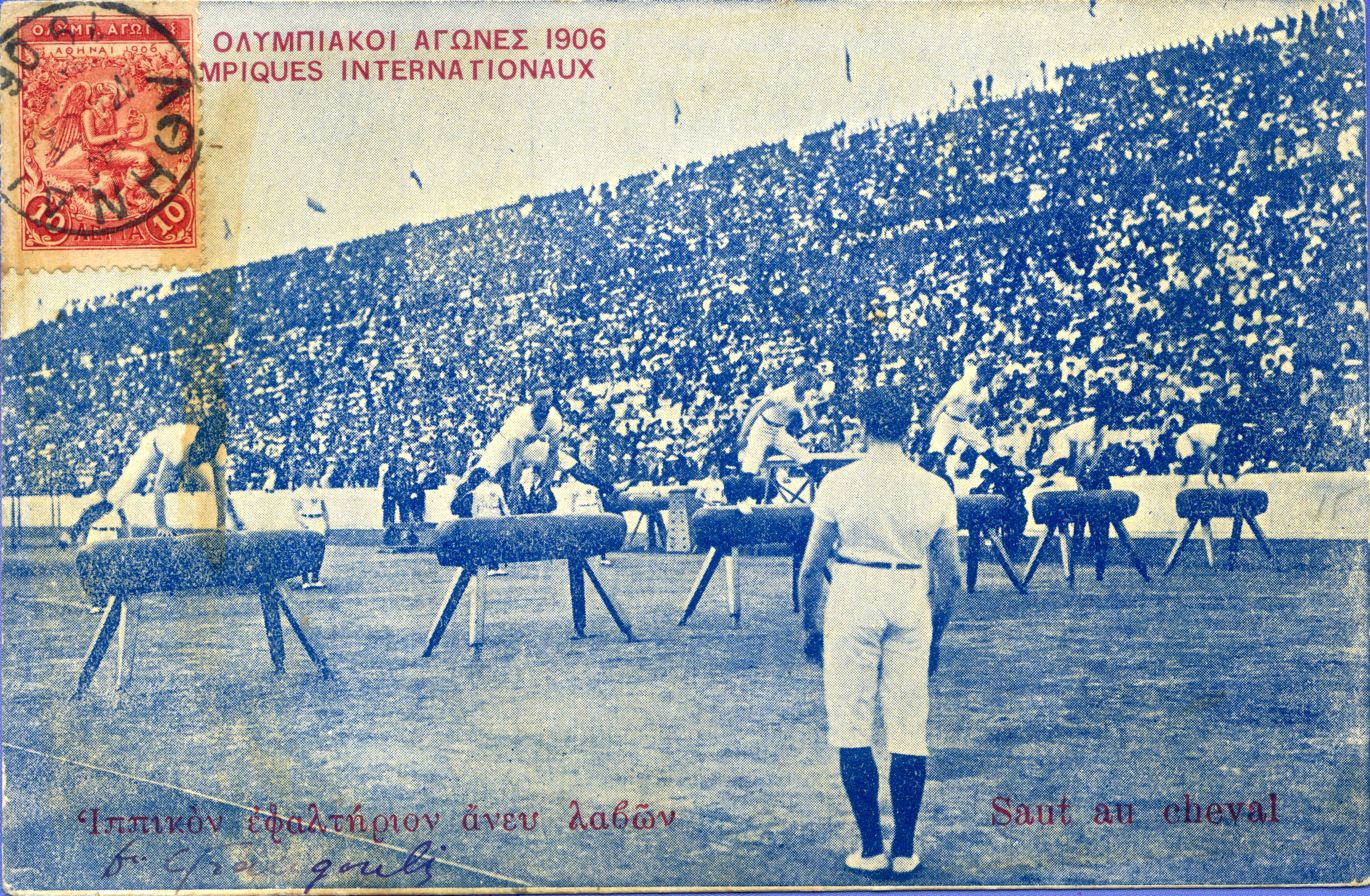
Vault

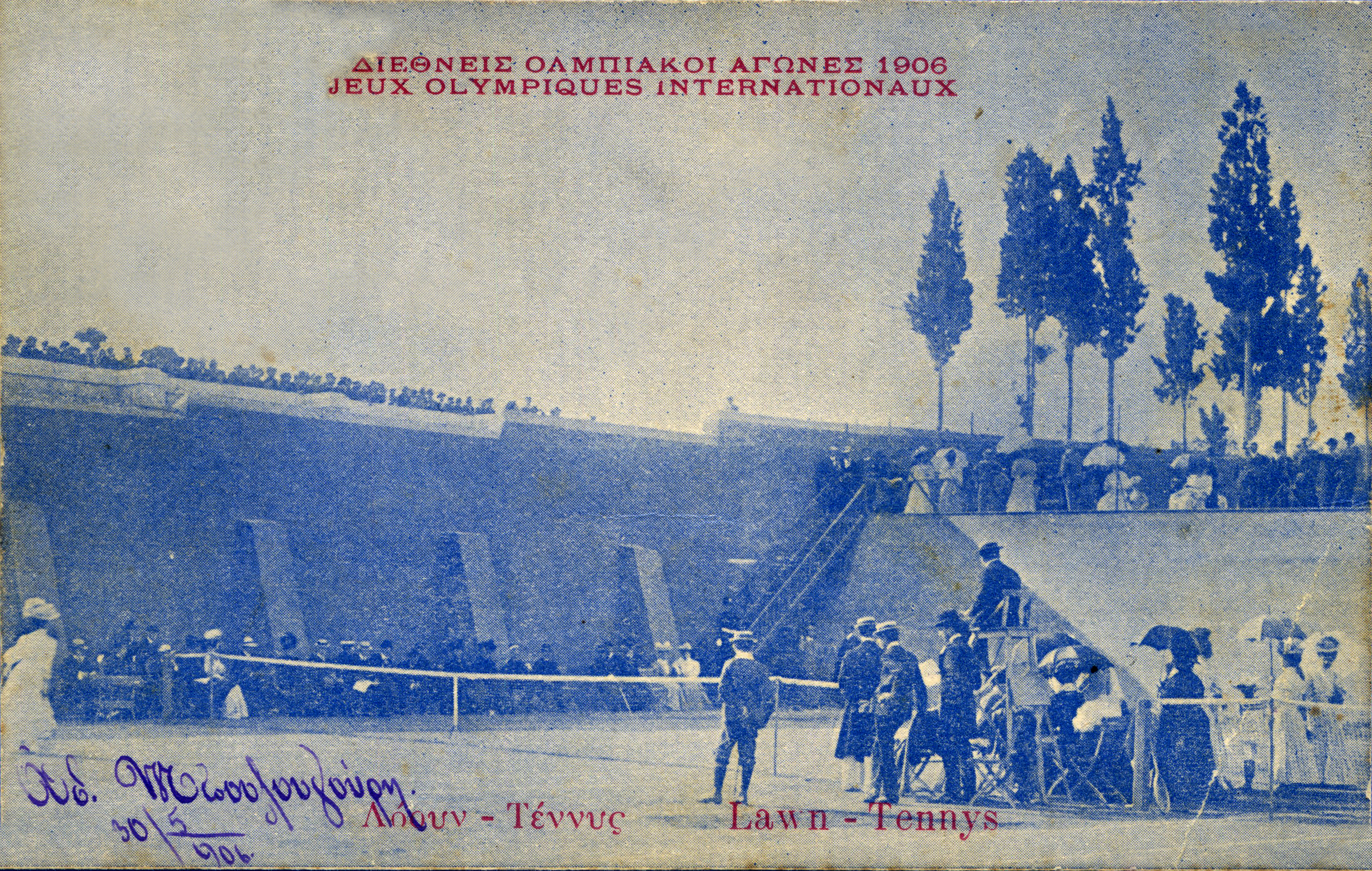
Lawn Tennis

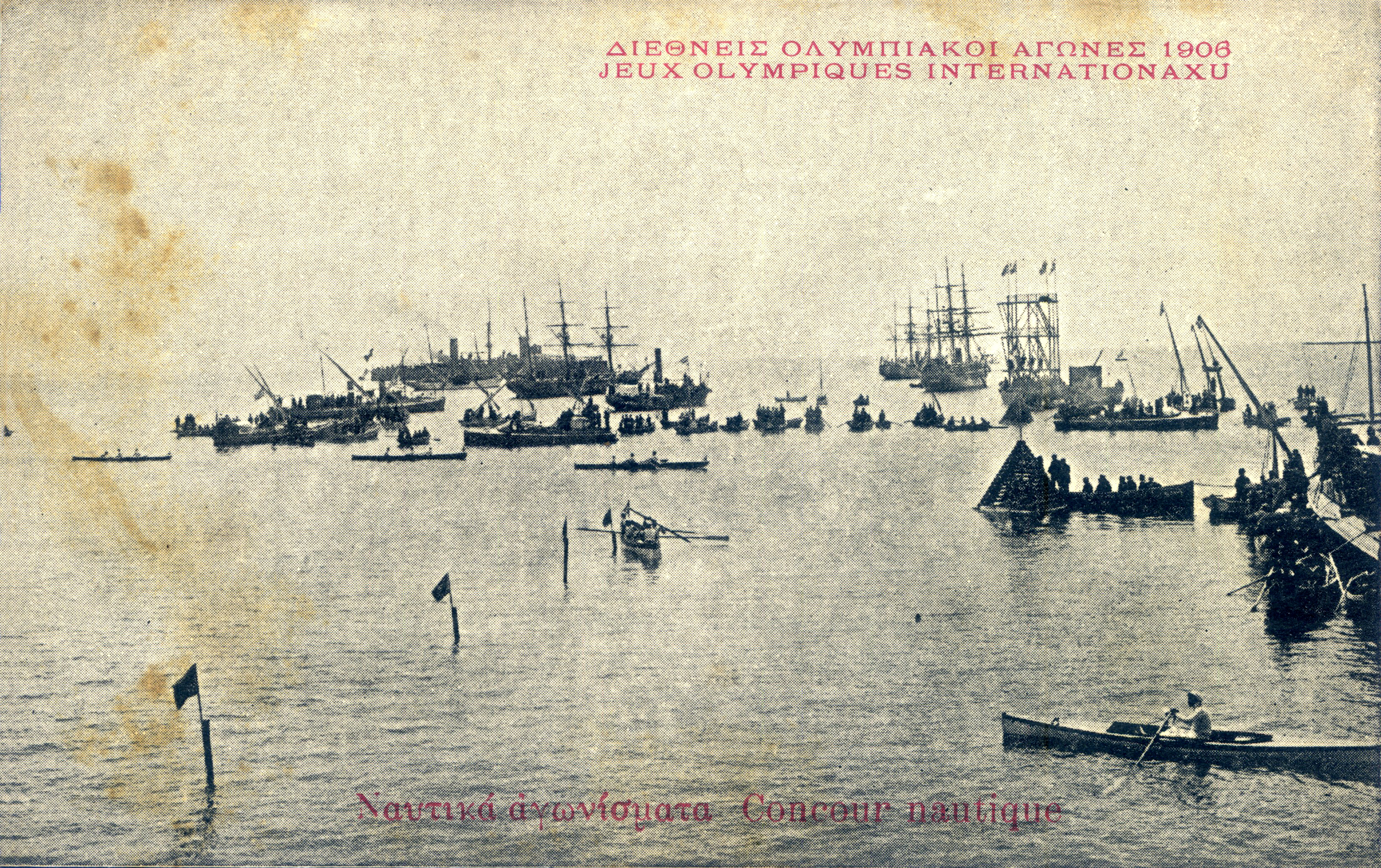
Nautical sports

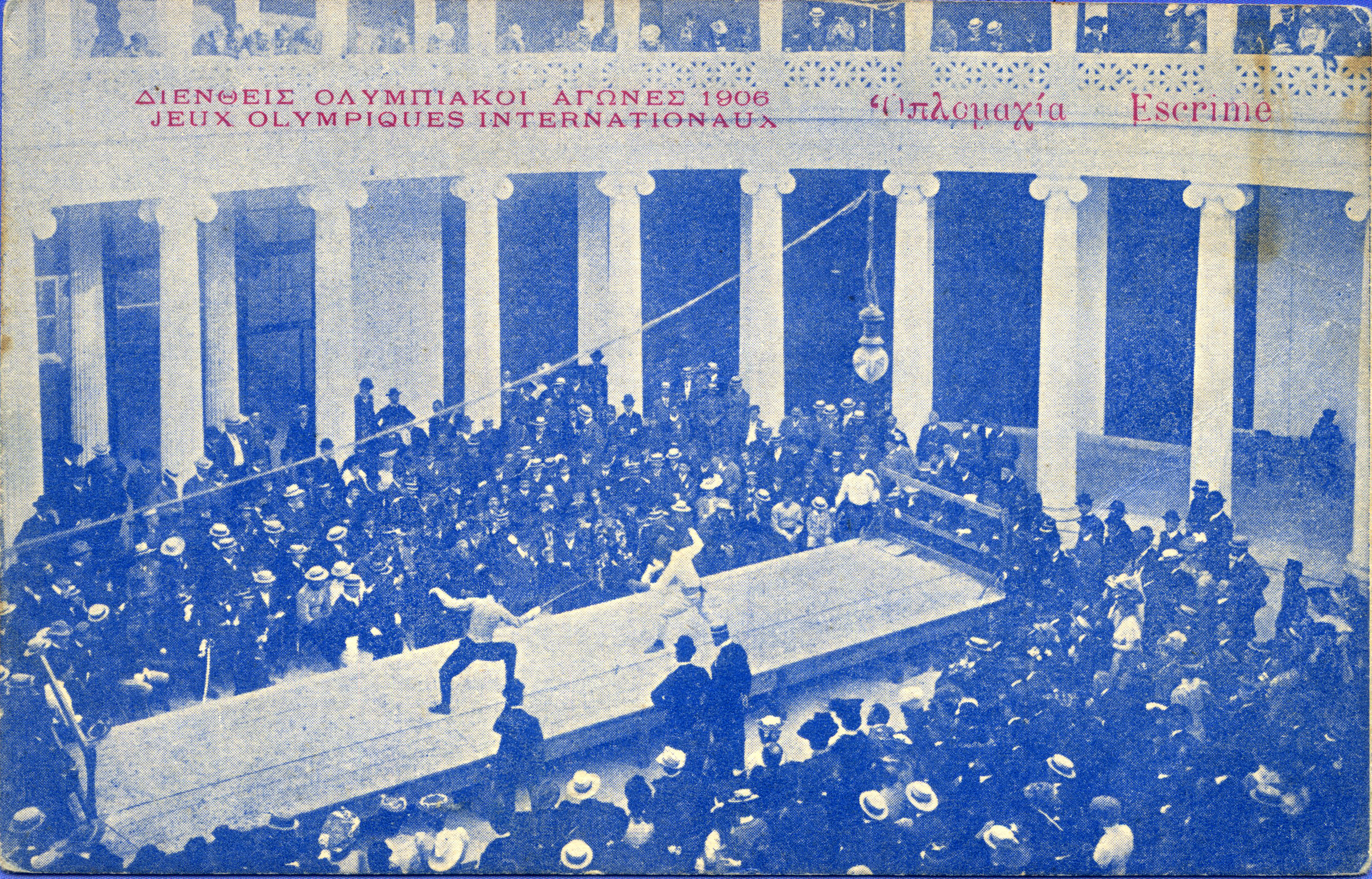
Fencing in the Zappeion

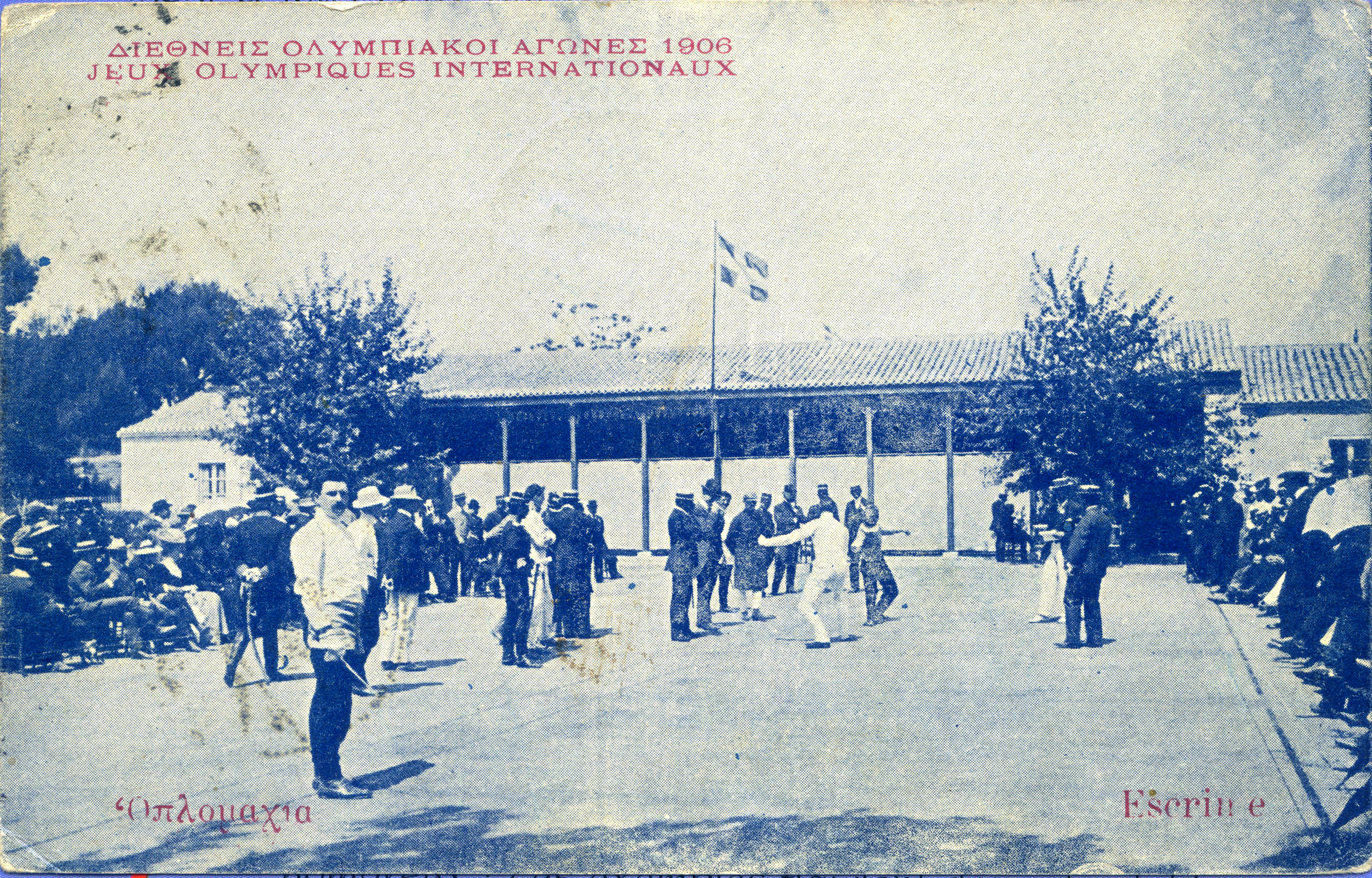
Fencing outdoors

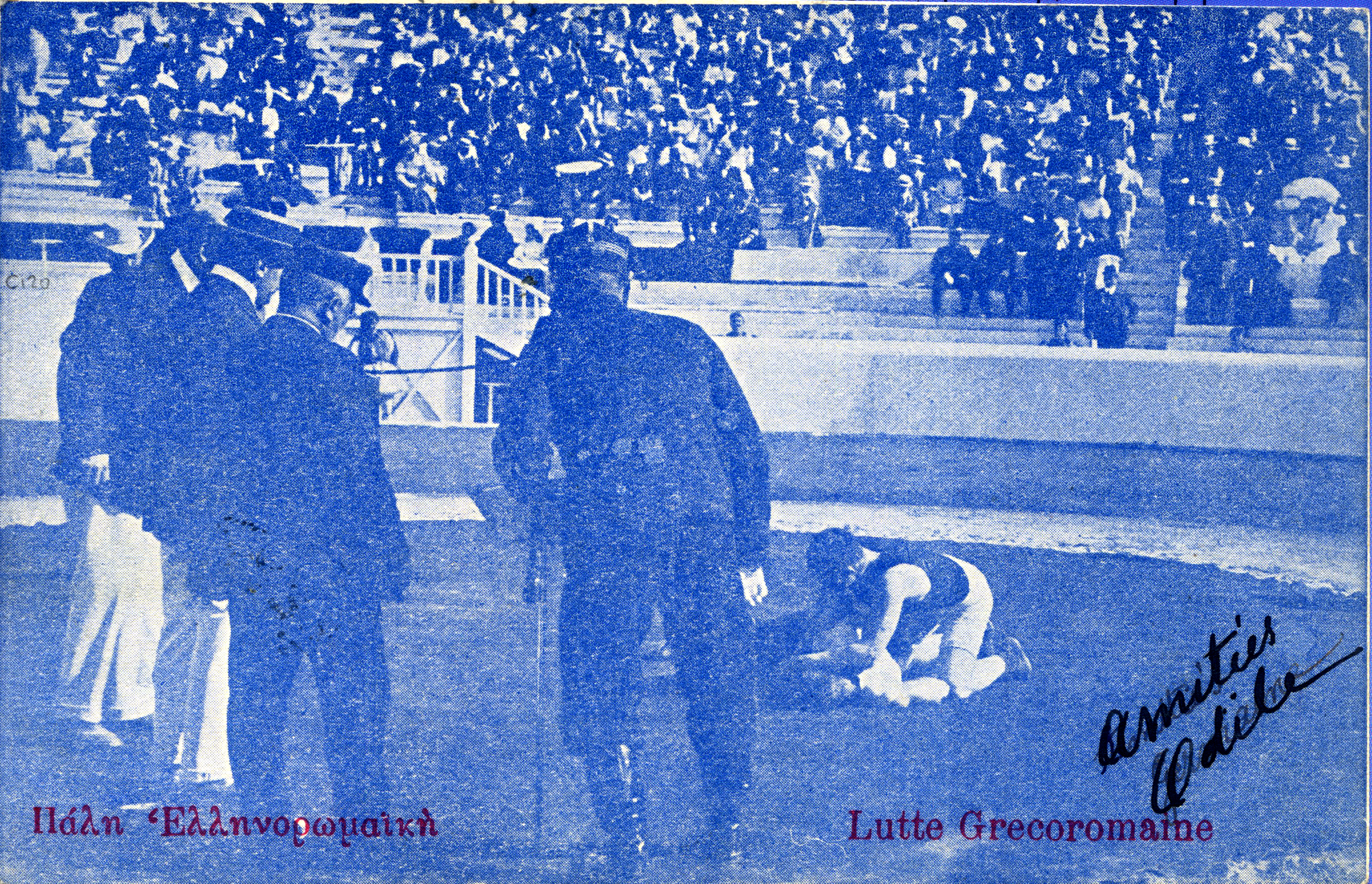
Greco-Roman Wrestling

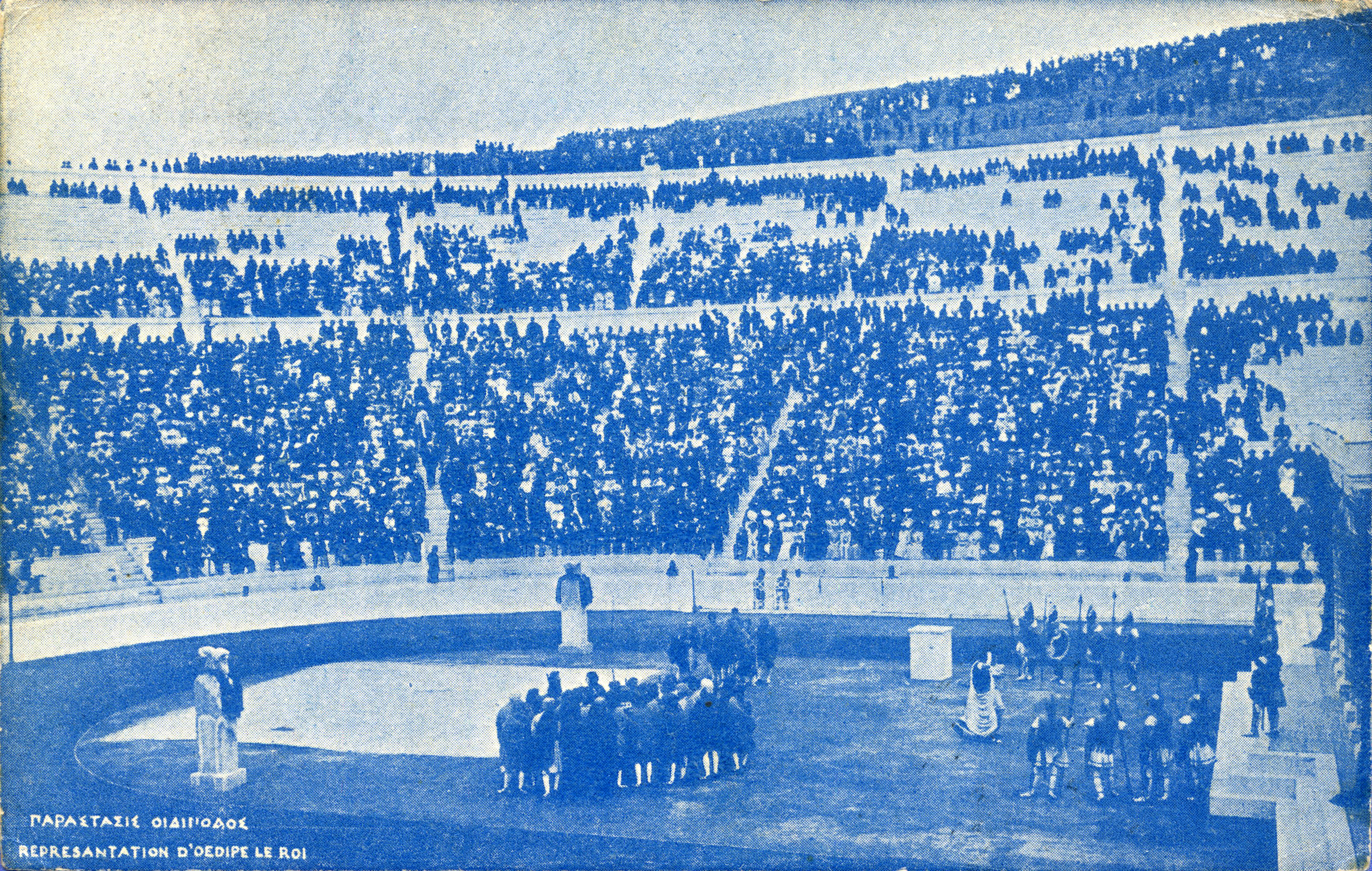
Performance of Oedipus Rex

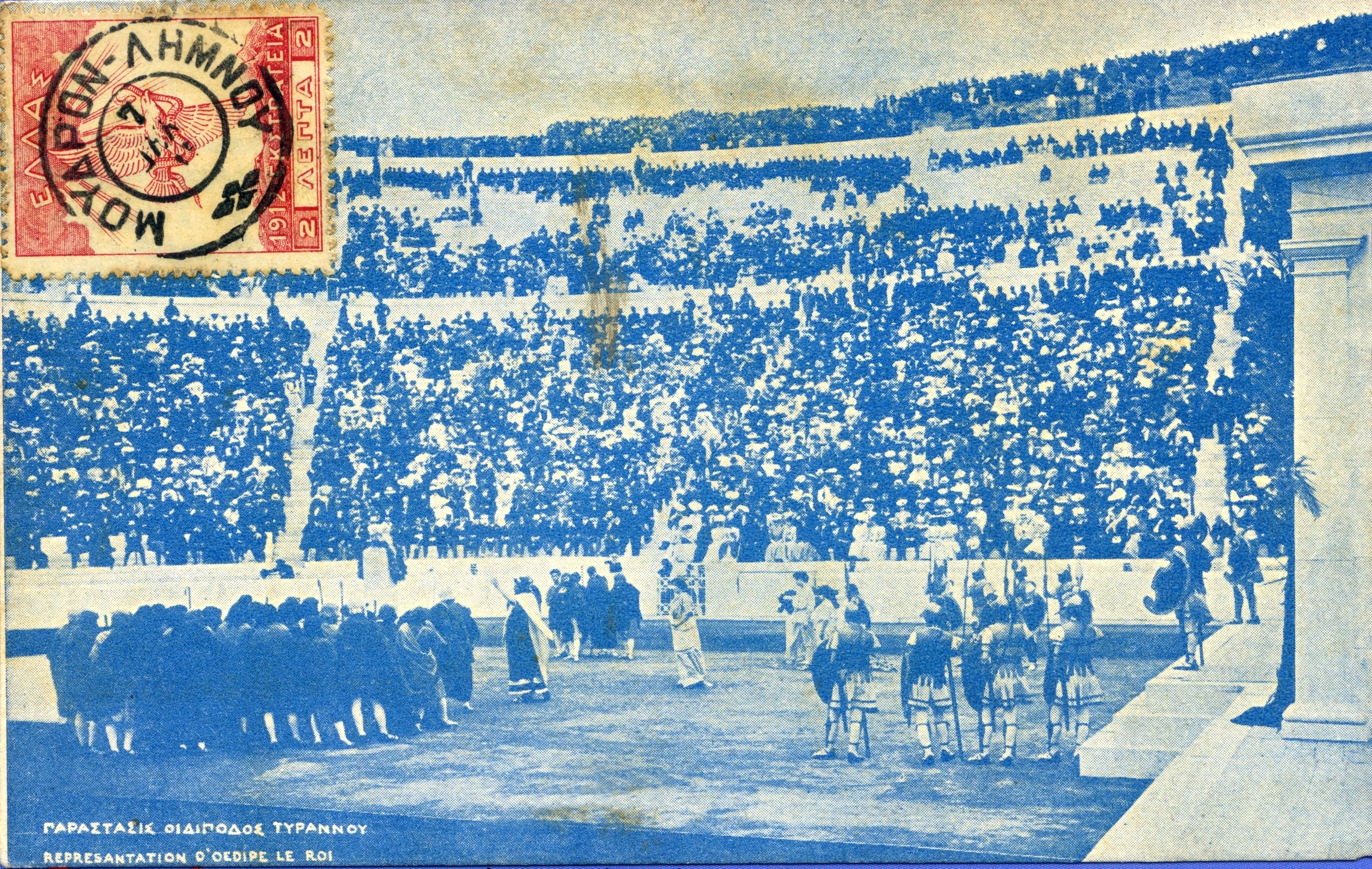
Performance of Oedipus Rex

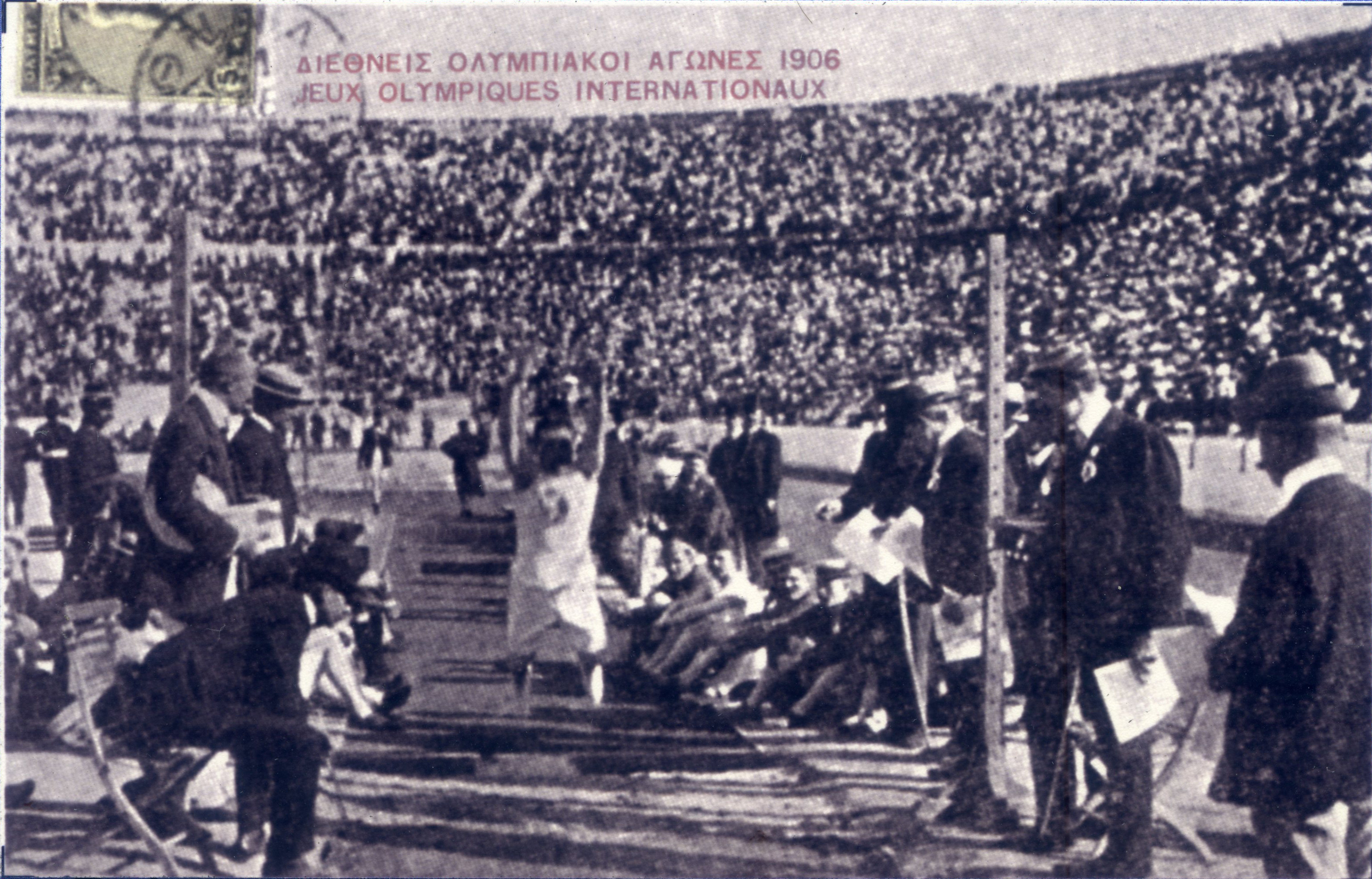
Long jump

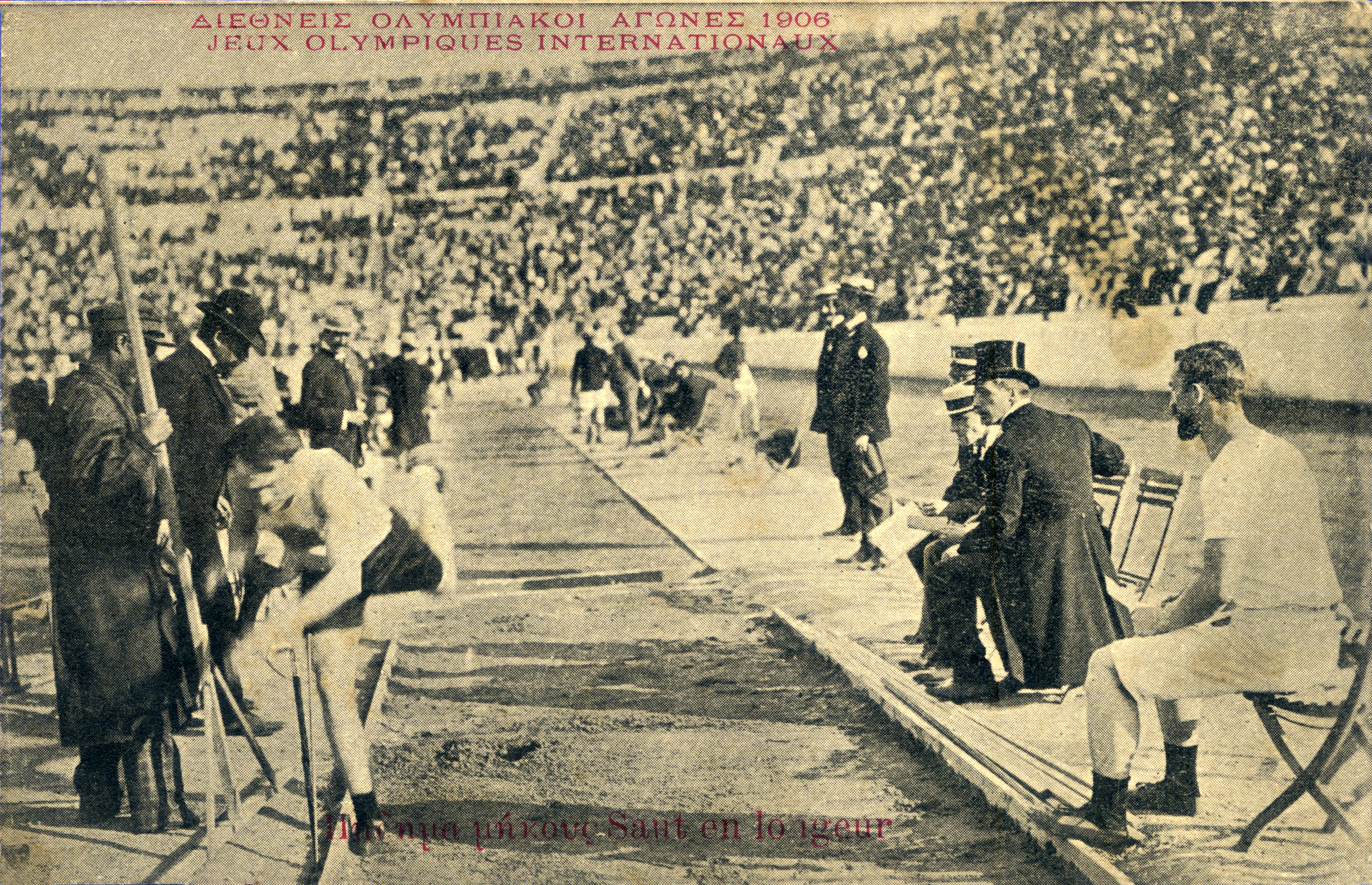
Long jump

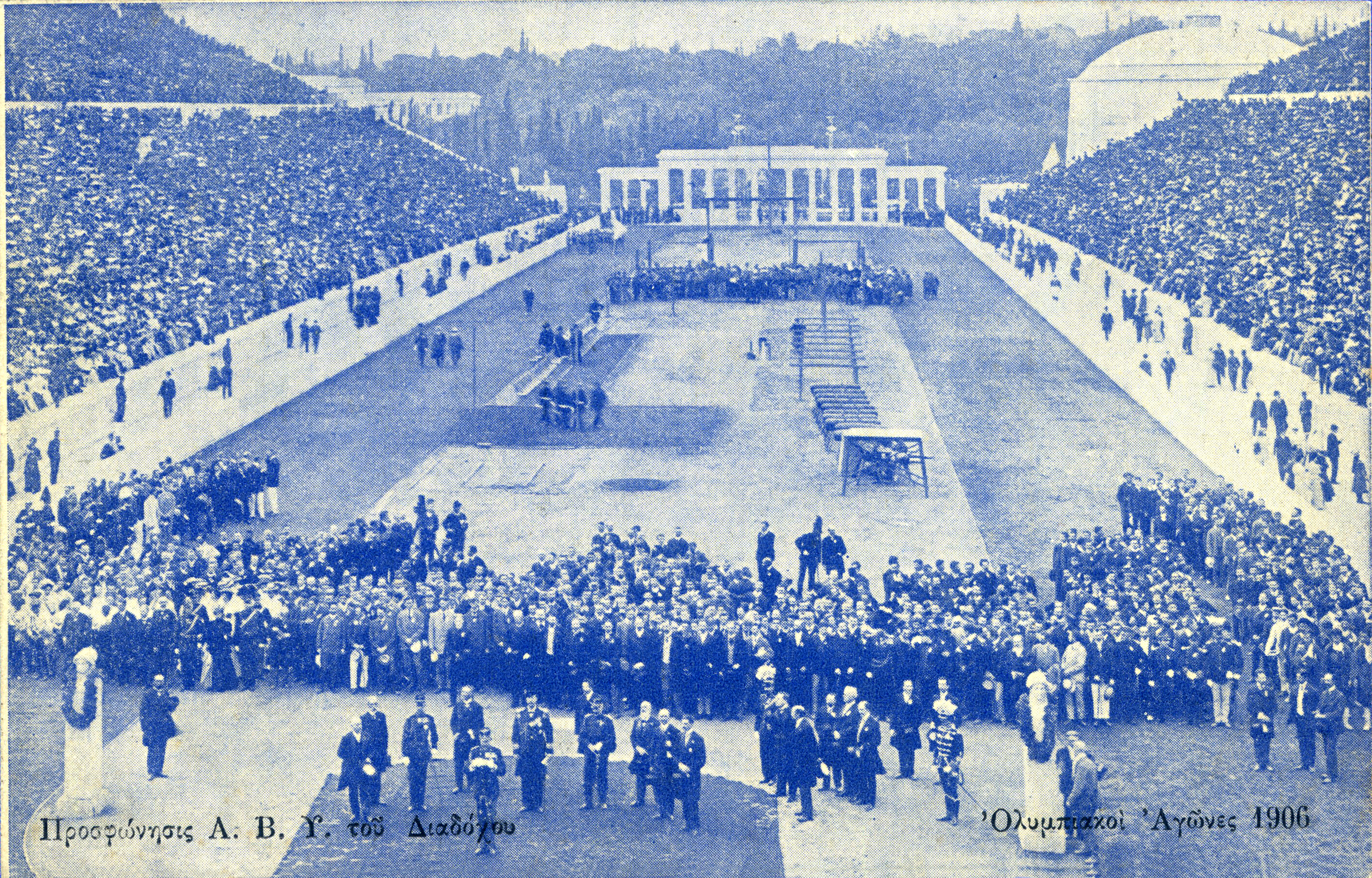
Address by H.R.H. the Crown Prince

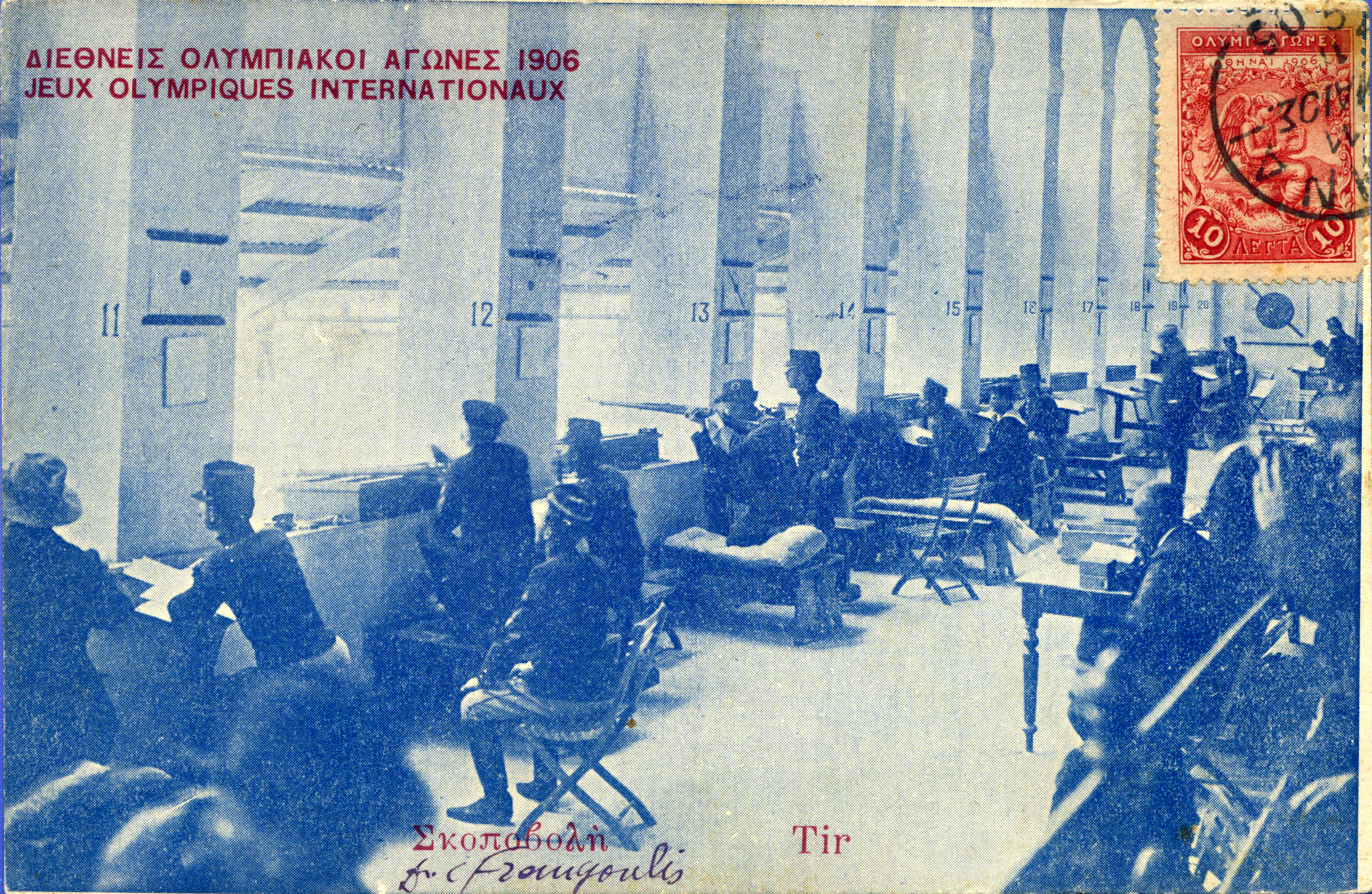
Shooting

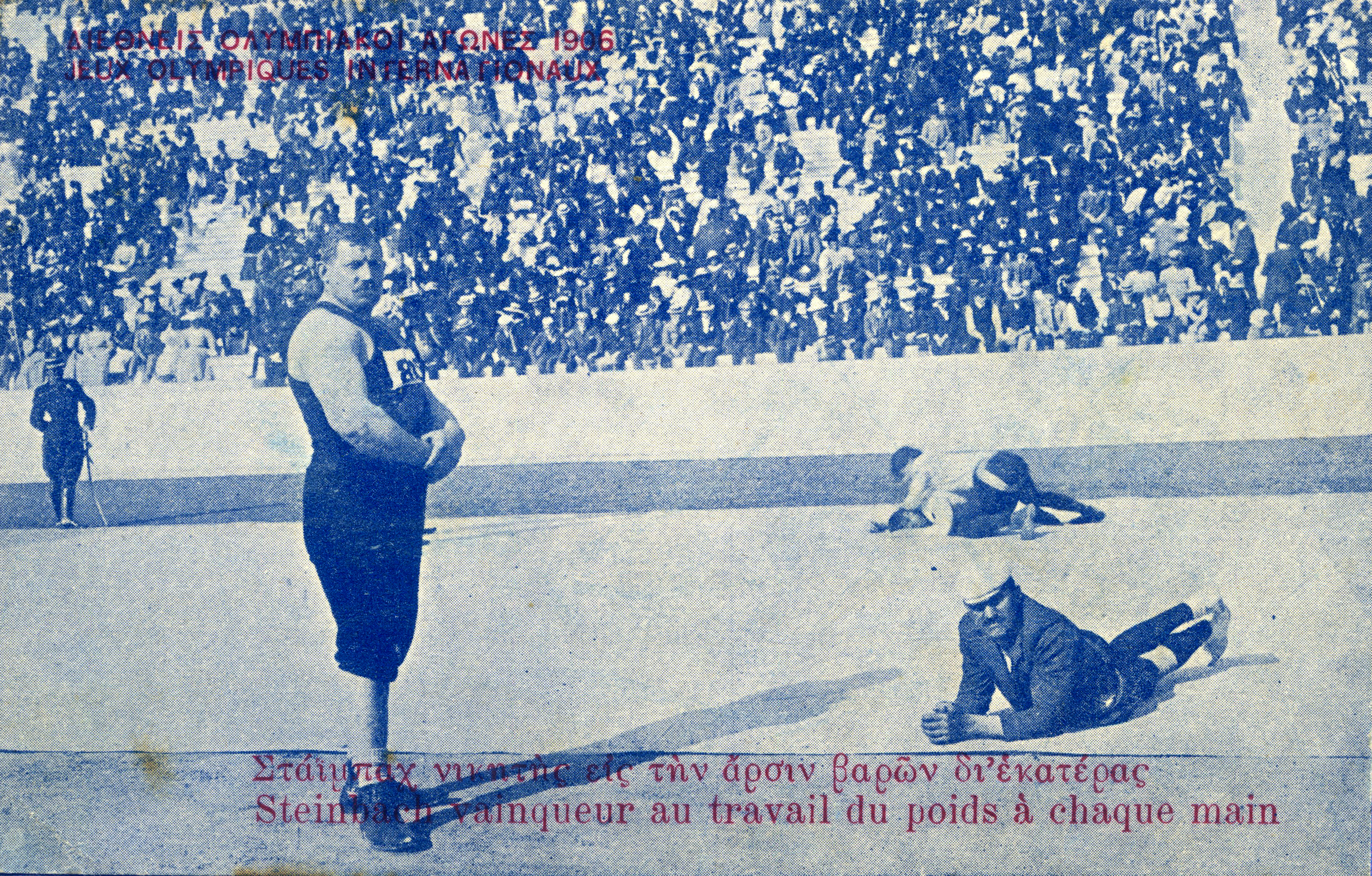
Steinbach, winner in weight lifting

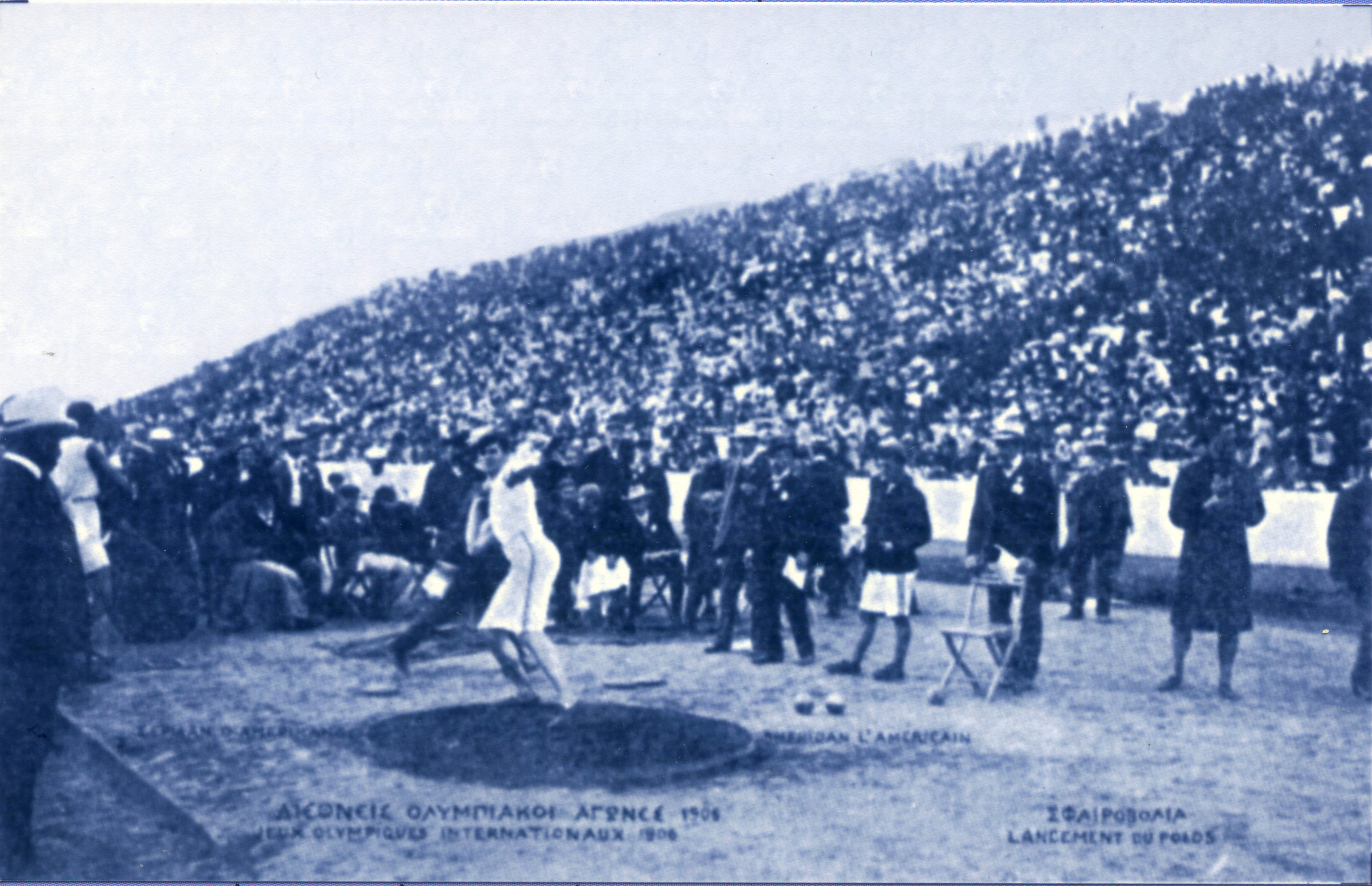
Shot Put. Sheridan winner

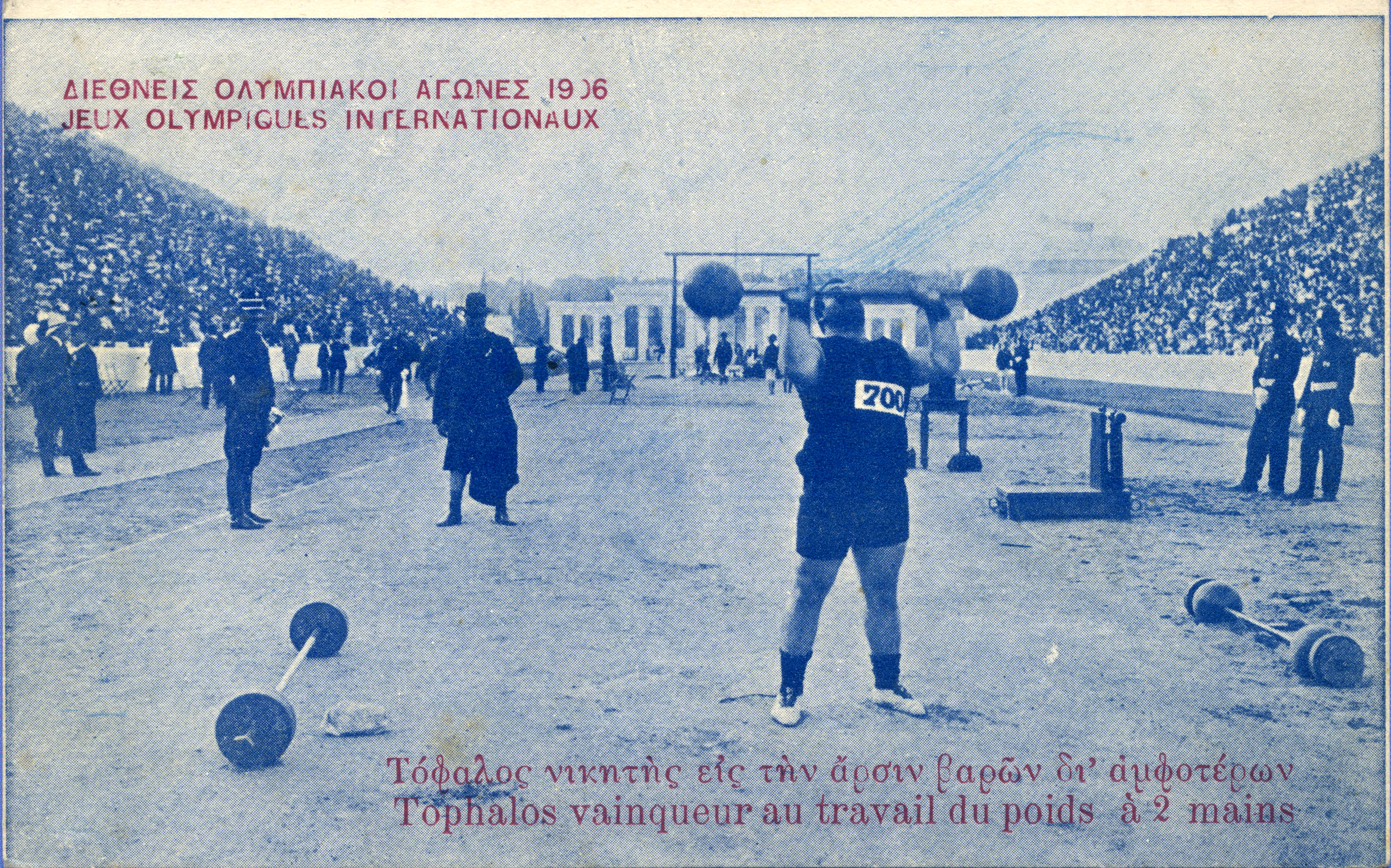
Weight lifting with 2 hands. Tofalos winner

== See also ==
- 1992 Winter Olympics
- 1994 Winter Olympics
- IOC country codes
