= Athletics at the 1920 Summer Olympics – Men's team cross country =

Athletics at the Olympics

Men's team cross country at the Games of the VII Olympiad
- Venue: Olympisch Stadion
- Date: August 23, 1920
- Competitors: 24 from 8 nations

Medalists
1st place, gold medalist(s)		Teodor Koskenniemi, Heikki Liimatainen, Paavo Nurmi; Finland
2nd place, silver medalist(s)		Anton Hegarty, Alfred Nichols, James Wilson; Great Britain
3rd place, bronze medalist(s)		Eric Backman, Hilding Ekman, Gustaf Mattsson; Sweden

The men's team cross country event was part of the track and field athletics programme at the 1920 Summer Olympics. It was the second appearance of this event. The competition was held on Monday, August 23, 1920.

Eight nations competed as they have at least three competitors participating in the individual cross country race.

== Results ==
The first three runners for each nation to finish in the individual cross country race counted towards the team results. Their placings were summed, and the team with the lowest sum won.

Place	Team	Score	Total
Final
1	Finland		10
1	Paavo Nurmi	1	10
1	Heikki Liimatainen	3	10
1	Teodor Koskenniemi	6	10
	Ilmari Vesamaa	14	
	Eino Rastas	18	
	Hannes Miettinen	23	
2	Great Britain		21
2	James Wilson	4	21
2	Anton Hegarty	5	21
2	Alfred Nichols	12	21
	Christopher Vose	19	
	Walter Freeman	22	
	Larry Cummins	26	
3	Sweden		23
3	Eric Backman	2	23
3	Gustaf Mattsson	10	23
3	Hilding Ekman	11	23
	Werner Magnusson	13	
	Lars Hedwall	24	
	Knut Alm	30	
4	United States		36
4	Patrick Flynn	9	36
4	Fred Faller	13	36
4	Max Bohland	14	36
	Lewis Watson	34	
	Bob Crawford	40	
	Amisoli Patasoni	DNF	
5	France		40
5	Gaston Heuet	8	40
5	Gustave Lauvaux	15	40
5	Joseph Servella	17	40
	Edmond Brossard	31	
	Edmond Bimont	32	
	Joseph Guillemot	DNF	
6	Belgium		48
6	Julien Van Campenhout	7	48
6	Henri Smets	20	48
6	Aimé Proot	21	48
	François Vyncke	37	
	Pierre Trullemans	41	
	Émile Rivez	42	
7	Denmark		53
7	Albert Andersen	16	53
7	Henrik Sørensen	18	53
7	Jón Jónsen	19	53
	Julius Ebert	35	
	Artur Nielsen	DNF	
