= Athletics at the 1920 Summer Olympics – Men's individual cross country =

Athletics at the Olympics

Men's individual cross country at the Games of the VII Olympiad
- Venue: Olympisch Stadion
- Date: August 23, 1920
- Competitors: 47 from 12 nations

Medalists
1st place, gold medalist(s)		Paavo Nurmi	Finland
2nd place, silver medalist(s)		Eric Backman	Sweden
3rd place, bronze medalist(s)		Heikki Liimatainen	Finland

The men's individual cross country event was part of the track and field athletics programme at the 1920 Summer Olympics. It was the second appearance of this event. The competition was held on Monday, August 23, 1920. Forty-seven runners from 12 nations competed.

== Records ==
The course was about 8 kilometers long, shorter than the previous Olympic cross-country race and a distance still widely competed in at the collegiate level. The records for 8-kilometer cross country race individual times were as follows:

World record	
Olympic record	N/A

== Results ==
The first three runners for each nation to finish in this event were also counted towards the cross country team result.

Place	Athlete	Time
1	Paavo Nurmi (FIN)	27:15.0
2	Eric Backman (SWE)	27:17.6
3	Heikki Liimatainen (FIN)	27:37.0
4	James Wilson (GBR)	27:45.2
5	Anton Hegarty (GBR)	27:57.0
6	Teodor Koskenniemi (FIN)	27:57.2
7	Julien Van Campenhout (BEL)	28:00.0
8	Gaston Heuet (FRA)	28:10.0
9	Patrick Flynn (USA)	28:12.0
10	Gustaf Mattsson (SWE)	28:16.0
11	Hilding Ekman (SWE)	28:17.0
12	Alfred Nichols (GBR)	28:20.0
13	Werner Magnusson (SWE)	
14	Ilmari Vesamaa (FIN)	
15	Fred Faller (USA)	
16	Max Bohland (USA)	
17	Gustave Lauvaux (FRA)	
18	Eino Rastas (FIN)	
19	Christopher Vose (GBR)	
20	Albert Andersen (DEN)	
21	Joseph Servella (FRA)	
22	Walter Freeman (GBR)	
23	Hannes Miettinen (FIN)	
24	Lars Hedwall (SWE)	
25	Julio Domínguez (ESP)	
26	Larry Cummins (GBR)	
27	Henrik Sørensen (DEN)	
28	Jón Jónsen (DEN)	
29	Tommy Town (CAN)	
30	Knut Alm (SWE)	
31	Edmond Brossard (FRA)	
32	Edmond Bimont (FRA)	
33	Henri Smets (BEL)	
34	Lewis Watson (USA)	
35	Julius Ebert (DEN)	
36	Aimé Proot (BEL)	
37	François Vyncke (BEL)	
38	Alexandros Kranis (GRE)	
39	Panagiotis Trivoulidas (GRE)	
40	Bob Crawford (USA)	
41	Pierre Trullemans (BEL)	
42	Émile Rivez (BEL)	
—	Even Vengshoel (NOR)	DNF
—	Joseph Guillemot (FRA)	DNF
—	Artur Nielsen (DEN)	DNF
—	Len Richardson (RSA)	DNF
—	Amisoli Patasoni (USA)	DNF
