= Athletics at the 1920 Summer Olympics – Men's 3000 metres team race =

Athletics at the Olympics

Men's 3000 metres team race at the Games of the VII Olympiad
- Venue: Olympisch Stadion
- Dates: August 21–22, 1920
- Competitors: 31 from 6 nations

Medalists
1st place, gold medalist(s)		Hal Brown, Arlie Schardt, Ivan Dresser, Lawrence Shields, Michael Devaney; United States
2nd place, silver medalist(s)		Joe Blewitt, Albert Hill, William Seagrove, Percy Hodge, Duncan McPhee, James Hatton; Great Britain
3rd place, bronze medalist(s)		Eric Backman, Sven Lundgren, Edvin Wide, John Zander, Josef Holsner; Sweden

The men's 3000 metres team event was part of the track and field athletics programme at the 1920 Summer Olympics. It was the second appearance of a 3000-metre team race event after the debut in 1912, but the fifth time that a team contest was arranged at the Olympics. The competition was held on Saturday, August 21, 1920, and on Sunday, August 22, 1920. 31 runners from six nations competed.

== Records ==
The world record in the individual 3000 metres was 8:33.2 by John Zander. Zander's multiple world records in the event eclipsed the 8:36.8 mark from the 1912 Olympic team race, which at the time was a world record.

World record	John Zander (SWE)	8:33.2	Stockholm	7 August 1918
Olympic record	Johannes Kolehmainen (FIN)	8:36.8	Stockholm	12 July 1912

In the second heat, Edmond Brossard set a new Olympic record of 8:35.6.

== Results ==
=== Semifinals ===
Both semi-finals were held on Saturday, August 21, 1920.

Semifinal 1

Team result

Place	Team	Scores				Qual.
Place	Team	1	2	3	Total	Qual.
1	Great Britain	2	4	5	11	Q
2	Sweden	1	3	8	12	Q
3	Italy	6	9	10	25	Q
4	Belgium	7	11	12	30	

Individual race result

Place	Athlete	Score
1	Sven Lundgren (SWE)	1
2	Duncan McPhee (GBR)	2
3	John Zander (SWE)	3
4	Joe Blewitt (GBR)	4
5	William Seagrove (GBR)	5
6	Ernesto Ambrosini (ITA)	6
7	Julien Van Campenhout (BEL)	7
8	Eric Backman (SWE)	8
9	Augusto Maccario (ITA)	9
10	Carlo Speroni (ITA)	10
11	Edvin Wide (SWE)	—
12	Percy Hodge (GBR)	—
13	James Hatton (GBR)	—
14	Joseph Otterbeen (BEL)	11
15	Carlo Martinenghi (ITA)	—
16	Lucien Bangels (BEL)	12
17	Josef Holsner (SWE)	—
18	François Vyncke (BEL)	—
19	Pierre Trullemans (BEL)	—
20	Henri Smets (BEL)	—

Semifinal 2

Team result:

Place	Team	Scores				Qual.
Place	Team	1	2	3	Total	Qual.
1	France	1	2	4	7	Q
2	United States	3	5	6	14	Q

Individual race result:

Place	Athlete	Score	Time
1	Edmond Brossard (FRA)	1	8:35.6 OR
2	Armand Burtin (FRA)	2	8:36.4e
3	Hal Brown (USA)	3	
4	Gaston Heuet (FRA)	4	
5	Michael Devaney (USA)	5	
6	Ivan Dresser (USA)	6	
7	Lawrence Shields (USA)	—	
8	Arlie Schardt (USA)	—	
9	Lucien Duquesne (FRA)	—	
10	René Vignaud (FRA)	—	

=== Final ===
The final was held on Sunday, August 22, 1920.

Team result:

Place	Team	Scores			
Place	Team	1	2	3	Total
1	United States	1	3	6	10
2	Great Britain	5	7	8	20
3	Sweden	2	10	12	24
4	France	4	11	15	30
5	Italy	9	13	14	36

Individual race result:

Place	Athlete	Score	Time
1	Hal Brown (USA)	1	8:45.4
2	Eric Backman (SWE)	2	8:45.5e
3	Arlie Schardt (USA)	3	8:46.4e
4	Armand Burtin (FRA)	4	8:47.3e
5	Joe Blewitt (GBR)	5	
6	Ivan Dresser (USA)	6	
7	Albert Hill (GBR)	7	
8	Lawrence Shields (USA)	—	
9	William Seagrove (GBR)	8	
10	James Hatton (GBR)	—	
11	Ernesto Ambrosini (ITA)	9	
12	Michael Devaney (USA)	—	
13	Sven Lundgren (SWE)	10	
14	Gaston Heuet (FRA)	11	
15	Edvin Wide (SWE)	12	
16	Augusto Maccario (ITA)	13	
17	Carlo Speroni (ITA)	14	
18	Edmond Brossard (FRA)	15	
19	Carlo Martinenghi (ITA)	—	
20	Josef Holsner (SWE)	—	
21	Lucien Duquesne (FRA)	—	
—	Duncan McPhee (GBR)	DNF	
—	René Vignaud (FRA)	DNF	
