= Cross country running at the Olympics =

Cross country running at the Olympic Games
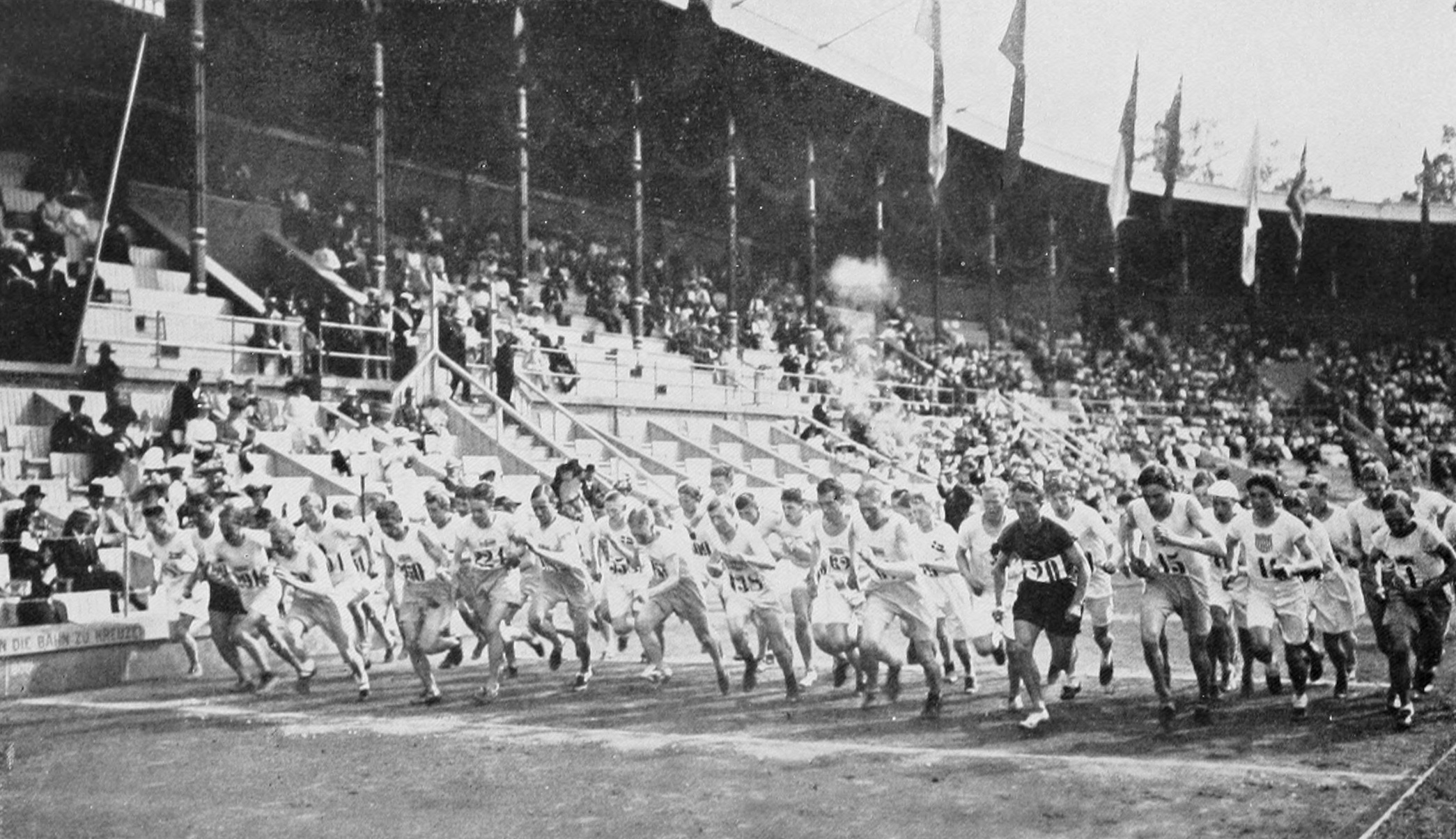
- The start of the first ever Olympic cross country race in 1912

Overview
- Sport: Athletics
- Gender: Men
- Years held: Men: 1912–1924

Cross country running at the Summer Olympics was held at the multi-sport event for men only from 1912 to 1924. During its brief tenure as an Olympic event, it featured on the Olympic athletics programme. Medals were awarded on an individual race basis as well as a national team points basis.

Traditionally a winter sport, the scheduling of cross country within a summer event caused organisational issues. The sport was dropped after the 1924 Olympics, when most of the runners dropped out due to extreme heat and pollution from a nearby power station.

Over its three appearances at the Olympics, Finnish runners dominated the event. Tying in with the emergence of the Flying Finns, Hannes Kolehmainen won the inaugural event, then Paavo Nurmi won the following two editions, winning gold medals both individually and in the team race.

Haile Gebrselassie, Kenenisa Bekele and Paul Tergat, all highly successful African long-distance runners, jointly issued an open letter in 2008 to the International Olympic Committee (IOC) president Jacques Rogge, urging him to consider the re-instatement of cross country as an Olympic sport. The International Association of Athletics Federations and athletics media have supported the idea of including the sport at the Winter Olympic Games. The IOC defines winter sports as those requiring snow or ice, presenting a possible block on its inclusion. Although the sport does not require such conditions, major cross-country events have been held on snow on numerous occasions.

There have been more recent efforts to bring cross-country running back to the Olympic Games. In 2020, World Athletics President Sebastian Coe pushed to bring the sport to the 2024 Summer Olympics in Paris, but the IOC rejected this proposal. Once the 2024 Summer Olympics arrived, Coe pushed for the sport to instead be included in the Winter Olympics, with efforts to make the sport appear in the 2030 and 2034 Winter Olympics in the French Alps and Salt Lake City respectively.

== Medal summary ==
=== Individual ===
Games	Gold	Silver	Bronze
1912 Stockholm	Hannes Kolehmainen (FIN)	Hjalmar Andersson (SWE)	John Eke (SWE)
1920 Antwerp	Paavo Nurmi (FIN)	Eric Backman (SWE)	Heikki Liimatainen (FIN)
1924 Paris	Paavo Nurmi (FIN)	Ville Ritola (FIN)	Earl Johnson (USA)

==== Multiple medalists ====
Rank	Athlete	Nation	Olympics	Gold	Silver	Bronze	Total
1	Paavo Nurmi	Finland	1920–1924	2	0	0	2

==== Medals by country ====
Rank	Nation	Gold	Silver	Bronze	Total
1	Finland	3	1	1	5
2	Sweden	0	2	1	3
3	United States	0	0	1	1

=== Team ===
Games	Gold	Silver	Bronze
1912 Stockholm	Sweden; Hjalmar Andersson; John Eke; Josef Ternström	Finland; Hannes Kolehmainen; Jalmari Eskola; Albin Stenroos	Great Britain; Frederick Hibbins; Ernest Glover; Thomas Humphreys
1920 Antwerp	Finland; Paavo Nurmi; Heikki Liimatainen; Teodor Koskenniemi	Great Britain; James Wilson; Anton Hegarty; Alfred Nichols	Sweden; Eric Backman; Gustaf Mattsson; Hilding Ekman
1924 Paris	Finland; Paavo Nurmi; Ville Ritola; Heikki Liimatainen	United States; Earl Johnson; Arthur Studenroth; August Fager	France; Henri Lauvaux; Gaston Heuet; Maurice Norland

==== Multiple medalists ====
Rank	Athlete	Nation	Olympics	Gold	Silver	Bronze	Total
1=	Paavo Nurmi	Finland	1920–1924	2	0	0	2
1=	Heikki Liimatainen	Finland	1920–1924	2	0	0	2

==== Medals by country ====
Rank	Nation	Gold	Silver	Bronze	Total
1	Finland	2	1	0	3
2	Sweden	1	0	1	2
3	Great Britain	0	1	1	2
4	United States	0	1	0	1
5	France	0	0	1	1

== Notes ==
- The Finnish team at the 1912 Olympics were officially part of the Russian Empire as part of the autonomous Grand Duchy of Finland, but for historical reasons, the IOC classifies their results as belonging to Finland, not Russia.
