= Athletics at the 1920 Summer Olympics – Men's 5000 metres =

Men's 5000 metres at the Games of the VII Olympiad
- Venue: Olympisch Stadion
- Dates: August 16–17, 1920
- Competitors: 38 from 16 nations

Medalists
1st place, gold medalist(s)		Joseph Guillemot	France
2nd place, silver medalist(s)		Paavo Nurmi	Finland
3rd place, bronze medalist(s)		Eric Backman	Sweden

The men's 5000 metres event was part of the track and field athletics programme at the 1920 Summer Olympics. The competition was held on Monday, August 16, 1920, and on Tuesday, August 17, 1920. Thirty-eight runners from 16 nations competed.

== Competition format ==
The competition consisted of two rounds. First four semifinals were held of 9 to 10 runners with the top four in each heat advancing. The final race was then held the next day with 16 competitors.

== Records ==
These were the standing world and Olympic records (in minutes) prior to the 1920 Summer Olympics.

World record	14:36.6	Hannes Kolehmainen (FIN)	Stockholm (SWE)	July 10, 1912
Olympic record	14:36.6	Hannes Kolehmainen (FIN)	Stockholm (SWE)	July 10, 1912

== Schedule ==
Date	Time	Round
Monday, 16 August 1920	10:00	Round 1
Tuesday, 17 August 1920	15:15	Final

== Results ==
=== Semifinals ===
==== Semifinal 1 ====
Place	Athlete	Time	Qual.
1	Rudolf Falk (SWE)	15:17.8	Q
2	Herbert Irwin (GBR)	15:17.8	Q
3	Teodor Koskenniemi (FIN)	15:22.0	Q
4	Clifford Furnas (USA)	15:23.0	Q
5	Augusto Maccario (ITA)	15:23.2	
6	Alfred Gaschen (SUI)	15:38.0	
7	Jean-Baptiste Manhès (FRA)	16:17.8	
—	Pierre Trullemans (BEL)	DNF	
—	Panagiotis Retelas (GRE)	DNF	
—	Tommy Town (CAN)	DNF	

==== Semifinal 2 ====
Place	Athlete	Time	Qual.
1	Joe Blewitt (GBR)	15:19.8	Q
2	Julien Van Campenhout (BEL)	15:22.6	Q
3	Hal Brown (USA)	15:31.8	Q
4	Nils Bergström (SWE)	15:39.2	Q
5	Lucien Duquesne (FRA)	16:08.2	
6	Juan Muguerza (ESP)		
7	Konosuke Sano (JPN)		
—	Artur Nielsen (DEN)	DNF	
—	Teodoro Pons (ESP)	DNF	
—	Carlo Martinenghi (ITA)	DNF	

==== Semifinal 3 ====
Place	Athlete	Time	Qual.
1	Carlo Speroni (ITA)	15:27.6	Q
2	Paavo Nurmi (FIN)	15:33.0	Q
3	William Seagrove (GBR)	15:53.6	Q
4	Emanuel Lundström (SWE)	16:04.2	Q
5	Charles Hunter (USA)		
6	Alexandros Kranis (GRE)		
7	François Vyncke (BEL)		
8	Karel Pacák (TCH)		
9	Abdul Ali Maghoub (EGY)		

==== Semifinal 4 ====
Place	Athlete	Time	Qual.
1	Joseph Guillemot (FRA)	15:33.0	Q
2	Eric Backman (SWE)	15:34.0	Q
3	Ivan Dresser (USA)	15:41.6	Q
4	Alfred Nichols (GBR)	15:54.0	Q
5	Ilmari Vesamaa (FIN)	15:54.4	
6	Tomeichi Ohura (JPN)		
7	Jón Jónsen (DEN)		
8	Henri Smets (BEL)		
9	Gerardus van der Wel (NED)		

=== Final ===
Place	Athlete	Time
1st place, gold medalist(s)	Joseph Guillemot (FRA)	14:55.6
2nd place, silver medalist(s)	Paavo Nurmi (FIN)	15:00.0
3rd place, bronze medalist(s)	Eric Backman (SWE)	15:13.0
4	Teodor Koskenniemi (FIN)	15:17.0
5	Joe Blewitt (GBR)	15:19.0
6	William Seagrove (GBR)	15:21.0
7	Carlo Speroni (ITA)	15:21.2
8	Alfred Nichols (GBR)	15:24.0
9	Julien Van Campenhout (BEL)	15:25.0
10	Nils Bergström (SWE)	15:29.5
11	Rudolf Falk (SWE)	
12	Herbert Carmichael Irwin (GBR)	
13	Emanuel Lundström (SWE)	
—	Clifford Furnas (USA)	DNF
—	Hal Brown (USA)	DNF
—	Ivan Dresser (USA)	DNF

== Notes ==
- Belgium Olympic Committee (1957). Olympic Games Antwerp 1920: Official Report (in French).
- Wudarski, Pawel (1999). "Wyniki Igrzysk Olimpijskich" (in Polish).
