= Athletics at the 1920 Summer Olympics =

Athletics at the Games of the VII Olympiad
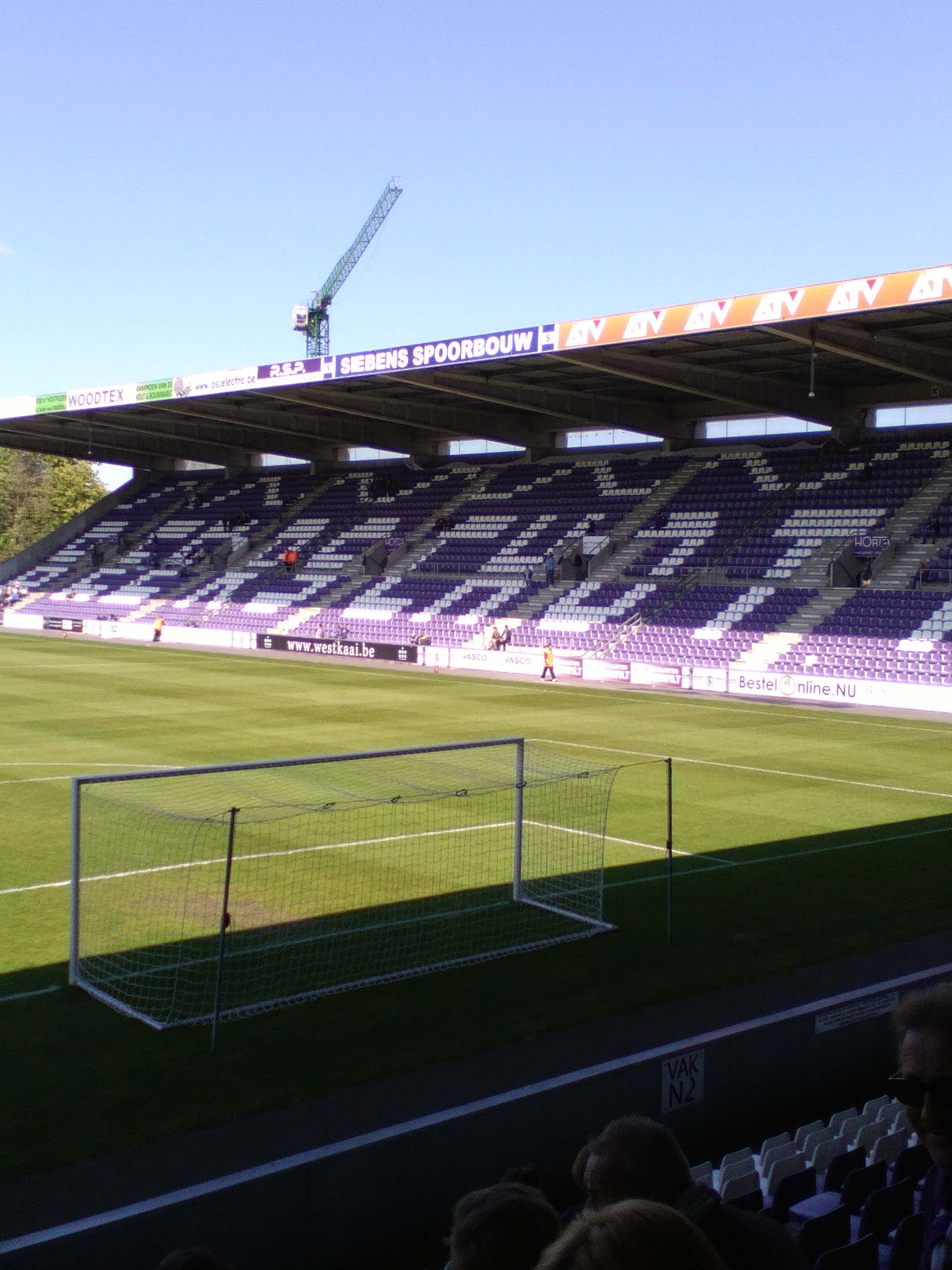
- Host stadium (shown in 2018)
- Venue: Olympisch Stadion
- Dates: 15-23 August
- No. of events: 29
- Competitors: 509 from 25 nations

At the 1920 Summer Olympics held in Antwerp, 29 athletics events were contested, all for men only. The competitions were held from August 15, 1920, to August 23, 1920.

== Medal summary ==
Event	Gold		Silver		Bronze	
100 metres	Charles Paddock; United States	10.8	Morris Kirksey; United States	10.9	Harry Edward; Great Britain	10.9
200 metres	Allen Woodring; United States	22.0	Charles Paddock; United States	22.0	Harry Edward; Great Britain	22.2
400 metres	Bevil Rudd; South Africa	49.6	Guy Butler; Great Britain	50.1	Nils Engdahl; Sweden	50.2
800 metres	Albert Hill; Great Britain	1:53.4	Earl Eby; United States	1:53.6	Bevil Rudd; South Africa	1:53.6
1500 metres	Albert Hill; Great Britain	4:01.8	Philip Noel-Baker; Great Britain	4:02.4	Lawrence Shields; United States	4:04.3
5000 metres	Joseph Guillemot; France	14:55.6	Paavo Nurmi; Finland	15:00.0	Eric Backman; Sweden	15:13.0
10,000 metres	Paavo Nurmi; Finland	31:45.8	Joseph Guillemot; France	31:47.2	James Wilson; Great Britain	31:50.8
110 metres hurdles	Earl Thomson; Canada	14.8 WR	Harold Barron; United States	15.1	Feg Murray; United States	15.1
400 metres hurdles	Frank Loomis; United States	54.0 WR	John Norton; United States	54.6	August Desch; United States	54.7
3000 metres steeplechase	Percy Hodge; Great Britain	10:00.4 OR	Patrick Flynn; United States	10:21.1	Ernesto Ambrosini; Italy	10:32.0
4 × 100 metres relay	United States; Charles Paddock; Jackson Scholz; Loren Murchison; Morris Kirksey	42.2 WR	France; René Lorain; René Tirard; René Mourlon; Émile Ali-Khan	42.5	Sweden; Agne Holmström; William Petersson; Sven Malm; Nils Sandström	42.8
4 × 400 metres relay	Great Britain; Cecil Griffiths; Robert Lindsay; John Ainsworth-Davis; Guy Butler	3:22.2	South Africa; Henry Dafel; Clarence Oldfield; Jack Oosterlaak; Bevil Rudd	3:23.0	France; Géo André; Gaston Féry; Maurice Delvart; André Devaux	3:23.5
3000 metres team race	United States; Horace Brown; Arlie Schardt; Ivan Dresser	10 pts	Great Britain; Joe Blewitt; Albert Hill; William Seagrove	20 pts	Sweden; Eric Backman; Sven Lundgren; Edvin Wide	24 pts
Marathon	Hannes Kolehmainen; Finland	2:32:35.8 WR	Jüri Lossmann; Estonia	2:32:48.6	Valerio Arri; Italy	2:36:32.8
3 kilometres walk	Ugo Frigerio; Italy	13:14.2 OR	George Parker; Australia	(13:19.6)	Richard Remer; United States	(13:22.2)
10 kilometres walk	Ugo Frigerio; Italy	48:06.2	Joseph Pearman; United States	(49:40.2)	Charles Gunn; Great Britain	(49:43.9)
Individual cross country	Paavo Nurmi; Finland	27:15.0	Eric Backman; Sweden	27:17.6	Heikki Liimatainen; Finland	27:37.0
Team cross country	Finland; Paavo Nurmi; Heikki Liimatainen; Teodor Koskenniemi	10 pts	Great Britain; James Wilson; Anton Hegarty; Alfred Nichols	21 pts	Sweden; Eric Backman; Gustaf Mattsson; Hilding Ekman	23 pts
High jump	Richmond Landon; United States	1.936 m OR	Harold Muller; United States	1.90 m	Bo Ekelund; Sweden	1.90 m
Pole vault	Frank Foss; United States	4.09 m WR	Henry Petersen; Denmark	3.70 m	Edwin Myers; United States	3.60 m
Long jump	William Petersson; Sweden	7.15 m	Carl Johnson; United States	7.095 m	Erik Abrahamsson; Sweden	7.08 m
Triple jump	Vilho Tuulos; Finland	14.505 m	Folke Jansson; Sweden	14.48 m	Erik Almlöf; Sweden	14.27 m
Shot put	Ville Pörhölä; Finland	14.81 m	Elmer Niklander; Finland	14.155 m	Harry Liversedge; United States	14.15 m
Discus throw	Elmer Niklander; Finland	44.685 m	Armas Taipale; Finland	44.19 m	Gus Pope; United States	42.13 m
Hammer throw	Patrick Ryan; United States	52.875 m	Carl Johan Lind; Sweden	48.43 m	Basil Bennett; United States	48.25 m
Javelin throw	Jonni Myyrä; Finland	65.78 m OR	Urho Peltonen; Finland	63.605 m	Pekka Johansson; Finland	63.095 m
56 lb (25 kg) weight throw	Pat McDonald; United States	11.265 m OR	Patrick Ryan; United States	10.965 m	Carl Johan Lind; Sweden	10.255 m
Pentathlon	Eero Lehtonen; Finland	14 pts	Everett Bradley; United States	24 pts	Hugo Lahtinen; Finland	26 pts
Decathlon	Helge Løvland; Norway	6803.355 pts	Brutus Hamilton; United States	6771.085 pts	Bertil Ohlson; Sweden	6580.030 pts

== Medal table ==
Rank	Nation	Gold	Silver	Bronze	Total
1	United States	9	12	8	29
2	Finland	9	4	3	16
3	Great Britain	4	4	4	12
4	Italy	2	0	2	4
5	Sweden	1	3	10	14
6	France	1	2	1	4
7	South Africa	1	1	1	3
8	Canada	1	0	0	1
8	Norway	1	0	0	1
10	Australia	0	1	0	1
10	Denmark	0	1	0	1
10	Estonia	0	1	0	1
Totals (12 entries)		29	29	29	87

== Participating nations ==
509 athletes from 25 nations competed. Czechoslovakia, Egypt, Estonia, Monaco, New Zealand, and Spain competed for the first time.

- Australia (4)
- Belgium (42)
- Canada (14)
- Chile (2)
- Czechoslovakia (16)
- Denmark (18)
- Egypt (2)
- Estonia (7)
- Finland (26)

- France (59)
- Great Britain (41)
- Greece (9)
- India (3)
- Italy (24)
- Japan (11)
- Luxembourg (7)
- Monaco (2)
- Netherlands (11)

- New Zealand (2)
- Norway (16)
- South Africa (13)
- Spain (14)
- Sweden (63)
- Switzerland (13)
- United States (90)
