= Joseph Otterbeen =

Belgian middle-distance runner

Personal information
- Nationality: Belgian
- Born: 5 October 1898 Antwerp
- Died: 20 May 1978 (aged 79) Antwerp

Sport
- Sport: Athletics
- Event: Middle-distance running

Joseph Otterbeen (5 October 1898 – 20 May 1978) was a Belgian athlete. He competed in the men's 3000 metres team race event at the 1920 Summer Olympics.

== Athlete career ==
Otterbeen's talent was cultivated during World War I. At his first Provincial Championship 5000 metres, he beat the defending champion and Dutch record-holder Julien Van Campenhout by taking the lead from him after ten laps, finishing in 15:31 3/5. One week later, the two re-matched in Brussels. This time, Van Campenhout took the win, controversially finishing in 15:52 as he stepped on Otterbeen's heels twice to the jeers and booing of the crowd. An elderly gentleman accosted Van Campenhout for the heel-clipping after the race, and Van Campenhout insulted him. The following month, Henri Smets again stepped on Otterbeen's heel in the same place that Van Campenhout did. Despite this, Otterbeen won the race against Smets and Émile Rivez to the crowd's surprise.

At the 1920 Olympic 3000 m team race, Otterbeen finished 14th in the first semi-final, contributing to Belgium's 4th-place finish. His team was the only team entered to not make the finals.

Otterbeen was selected to compete individually at the 1924 Olympics, but during practice he fell in a pit created by sprinters for their training. Otterbeen sprained his foot, and despite making several attempts at a comeback his injury spread to his kneecap. After having to keep his leg in plaster for a month, he didn't continue with distance running.
