= Martinenghi =

Martinenghi is an Italian surname. Notable people with the surname include:

- Carlo Martinenghi (1894–1944), Italian long-distance runner
- Italo Martinenghi (1930–2008), Italian film director, screenwriter, and film producer
- Nicolò Martinenghi (born 1999), Italian swimmer
