= Even Vengshoel =

Norwegian long-distance runner (1891–1968)

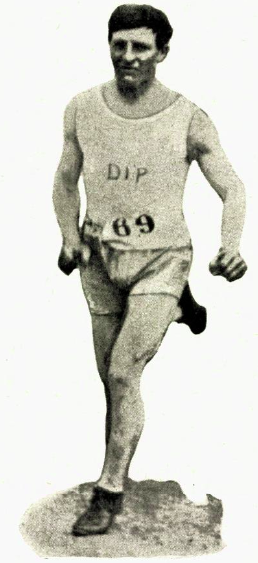

Personal information
- Nationality: Norwegian
- Born: 11 November 1891 Raufoss, Norway
- Died: 6 October 1968 (aged 76) Gausdal, Norway

Sport
- Sport: Athletics
- Event: Long-distance running

Even Vengshoel (11 November 1891 – 6 October 1968) was a Norwegian athlete. He competed in the men's individual cross country event at the 1920 Summer Olympics.
