= Nils Bergström (athlete) =

Swedish long-distance runner

Personal information
- Nationality: Swedish
- Born: 17 November 1898 Stockholm, Sweden
- Died: 27 January 1988 (aged 89) Stockholm, Sweden

Sport
- Sport: Long-distance running
- Event: 5000 metres

Nils Bergström (17 November 1898 – 27 January 1988) was a Swedish long-distance runner. He competed in the men's 5000 metres at the 1920 Summer Olympics.
