= Teodoro Pons =

Spanish long-distance runner

Personal information
- Nationality: Spanish
- Born: 21 December 1896 Mahón, Menorca, Spain
- Died: 1968 Barcelona, Spain

Sport
- Sport: Long-distance running
- Event: 5000 metres

Teodoro Pons Domínguez (21 December 1896 – 1968) was a Spanish long-distance runner. He competed in the men's 5000 metres at the 1920 Summer Olympics.
