= Gerardus van der Wel =

Dutch athlete

Personal information
- Nationality: Dutch
- Born: 5 January 1895 The Hague, Netherlands
- Died: 31 May 1945 (aged 50) Bergen-Belsen, Germany

Sport
- Sport: Long-distance running
- Event: 5000 metres

Gerardus van der Wel (5 January 1895 – 31 May 1945) was a Dutch long-distance runner. He competed in the men's 5000 metres at the 1920 Summer Olympics. He was killed in the Bergen-Belsen concentration camp during World War II.
