= Emanuel Lundström =

Swedish long-distance runner

Personal information
- Nationality: Swedish
- Born: 20 September 1896 Stockholm, Sweden
- Died: 4 April 1961 (aged 64) Stockholm, Sweden

Sport
- Sport: Long-distance running
- Event: 5000 metres

Emanuel Lundström (20 September 1896 – 4 April 1961) was a Swedish long-distance runner. He competed in the men's 5000 metres at the 1920 Summer Olympics.
