= 2030 Winter Olympics =

Upcoming multi-sport event in France

XXVI Olympic Winter Games
- Location: French Alps, France
- Events: 126 in 8 sports (17 disciplines)
- Opening: 1 February 2030
- Closing: 17 February 2030

The 2030 Winter Olympics (French: Jeux olympiques d'hiver de 2030), officially known as the XXVI Olympic Winter Games (French: XXVI^{es} Jeux Olympiques d'hiver) and branded as Alpes 2030, is an upcoming international winter multi-sport event scheduled to take place from 1 to 17 February 2030 in the French Alps.

Under the new Olympic bid process, the Future Host Commission of the International Olympic Committee (IOC) nominated the French Alps as its preferred candidate on 29 November 2023. The French Alps' bid was approved during the 142nd IOC Session in Paris, France on 24 July 2024.

Alpes 2030 will be the fourth Winter Olympics, and the seventh Olympic Games overall, to be hosted by France, and the first to be officially hosted by a region rather than one or more host cities. Events will take place primarily in the Metropolis of Lyon and in the departments of Savoie and Haute-Savoie in the Auvergne-Rhône-Alpes region, as well as in the Hautes-Alpes department in the Provence-Alpes-Côte d'Azur region. Due to the lack of suitable venues in France, speed skating is scheduled to be held in Heerenveen, Netherlands.

== Bidding process ==
Under the new bidding process established by Olympic Agenda 2020, the IOC's Future Host Commission (FHC) for the Winter Olympic Games engages in ongoing, non-committal "continuous dialogue" with parties that are interested in hosting a future edition. The Commission then recommends preferred candidates to be invited to "targeted dialogue" with the IOC Executive Board to formalise their bid, after which it is presented to the IOC's delegates for final approval.

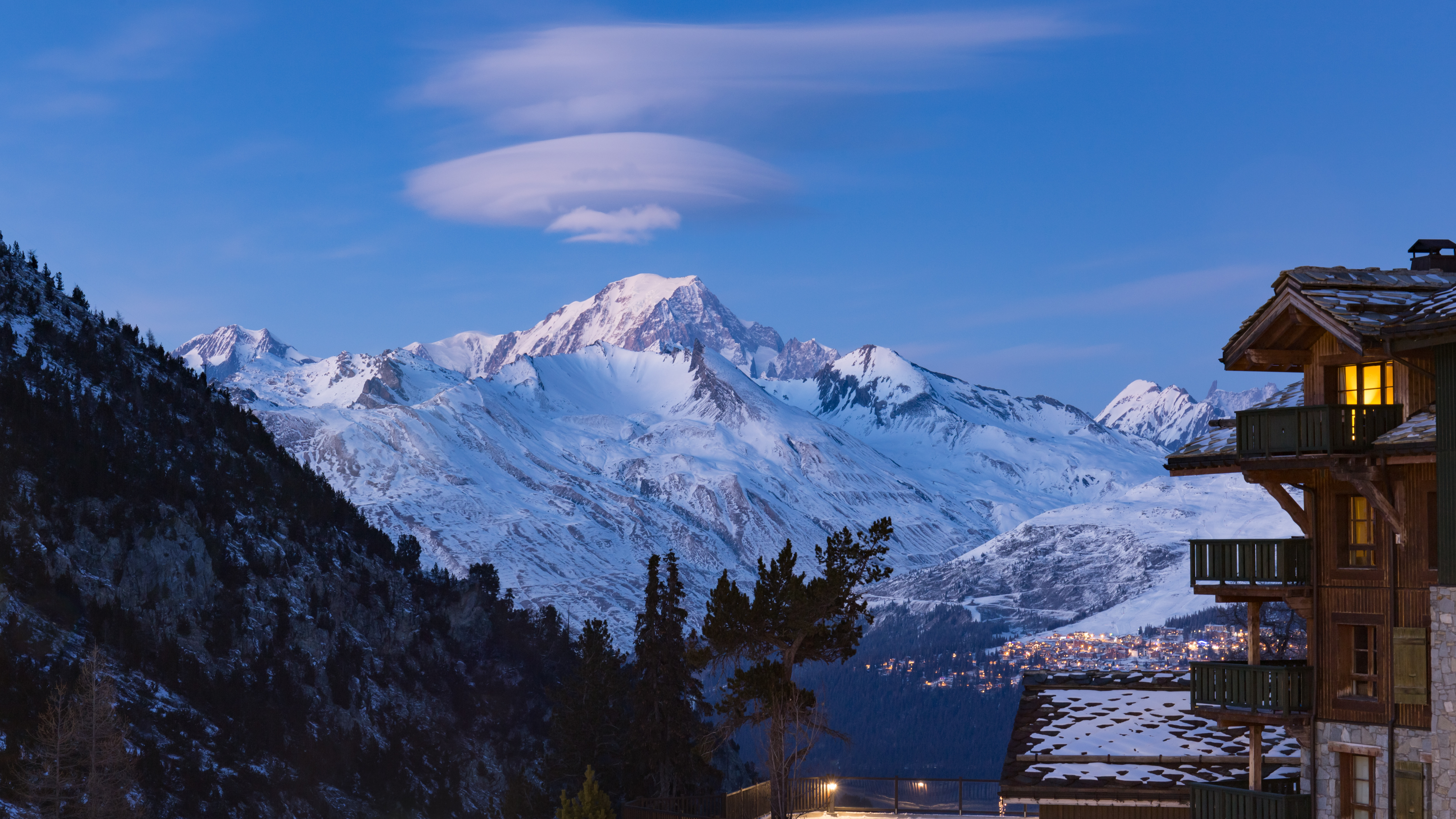
View of Mont Blanc from Les Arcs ski resort

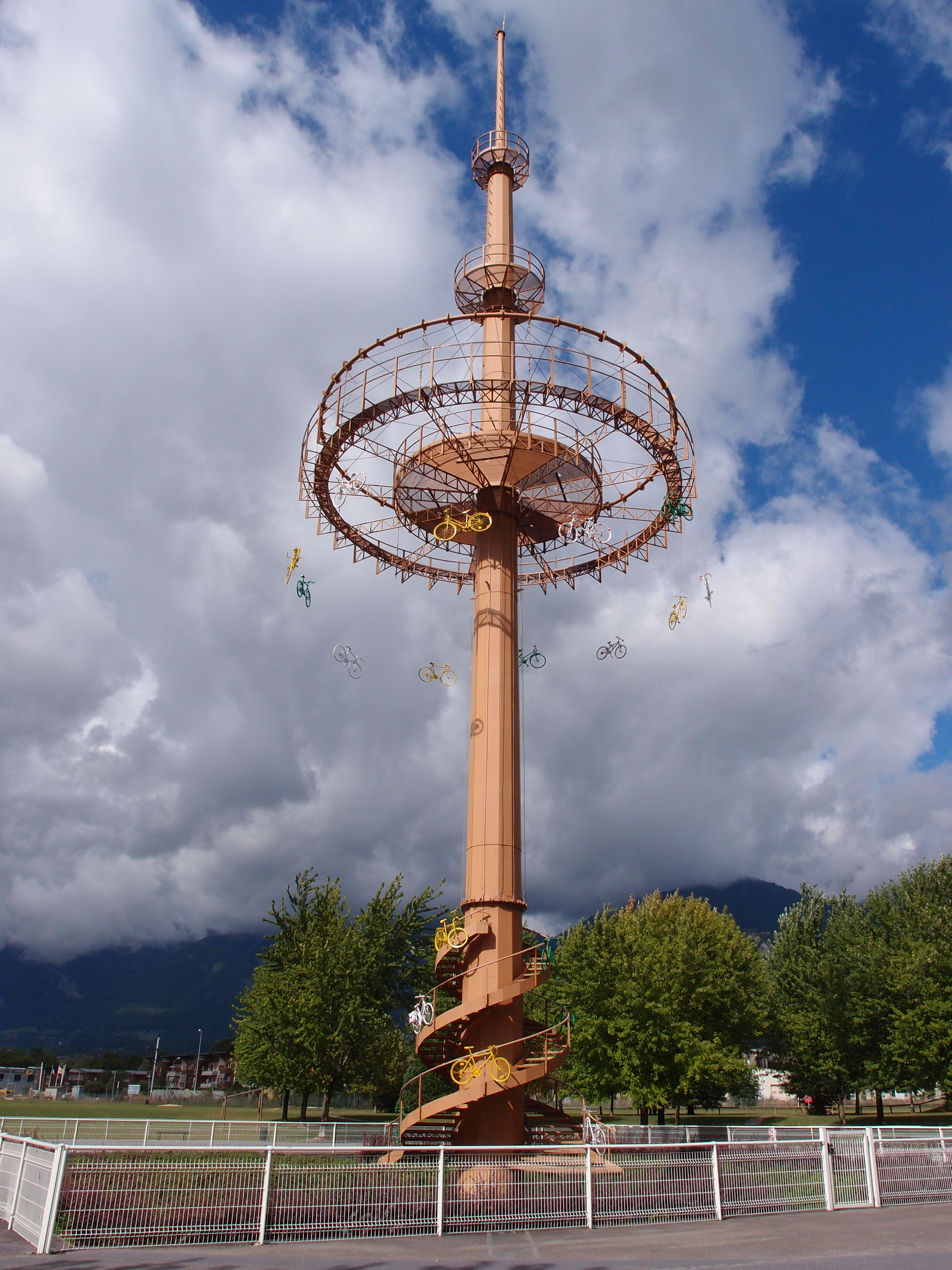
The Albertville pylon, a remnant of the 1992 Olympic Winter Games, where the Olympic flag arrived after the 2026 Winter Olympics.

During the 135th IOC Session in January 2020, FHC chair Octavian Morariu identified that Barcelona–Zaragoza, Salt Lake City (which hosted in 2002, but was understood to prefer 2034 so that it would not take place immediately after the 2028 Summer Olympics in Los Angeles), and Sapporo (which hosted in 1972) had entered into continuous dialogue regarding hosting a future Winter Olympics in 2030 or later. Spain dropped out in 2022 amid disputes between the autonomous Catalonian and Aragonian governments. In March 2023, Switzerland revealed that it had entered into continuous dialogue. In July 2023, the French National Olympic and Sports Committee announced its intent to enter into continuous dialogue with the FHC for a bid focusing on the French Alps. Sweden also proposed a Stockholm–Åre bid after the cities lost the 2026 Games to Milan–Cortina.

On 29 November 2023, per the recommendation of the Future Host Commission, the IOC Executive Board invited the French National Olympic and Sports Committee to targeted dialogue, proposing the French Alps as preferred host of the 2030 Winter Olympics. Switzerland would enter into "privileged dialogue" for potentially hosting in 2038. The French Alps were conditionally ratified as hosts during the 142nd IOC Session on 24 July 2024 in Paris, France; as per the new bid process, the vote was in the form of a referendum to the 95 IOC delegates.

The decision to award the Games was made under the condition that financial guarantees from the French government and local authorities be secured by October 2024; usually, these are secured as part of the bid process, but this was hindered by the then-ongoing French political crisis following the 2024 French legislative election. In October 2024, prime minister Michel Barnier sent a letter to IOC president Thomas Bach to confirm the French government's financial support.

2030 Winter Olympics host city election
Host	NOC name	Yes	No	Abs
French Alps	France	84	4	7

=== Handover ceremony ===
During the 2026 Winter Olympics closing ceremony in Verona, Italy, the French Alps were introduced as the next Winter Games host region, with the raising of the flag of France and a special performance of "La Marseillaise" in the arena.

== Development and preparations ==
=== Venues ===
The venues of the Games will be split between clusters in Lyon, Briançon, Haute-Savoie, and Savoie. Five Olympic villages are slated to be constructed for the Games, with one each in Lyon (in the suburb of Oullins-Pierre-Bénite), Briançon, and Haute-Savoie, and two in Savoie (locations to be determined).

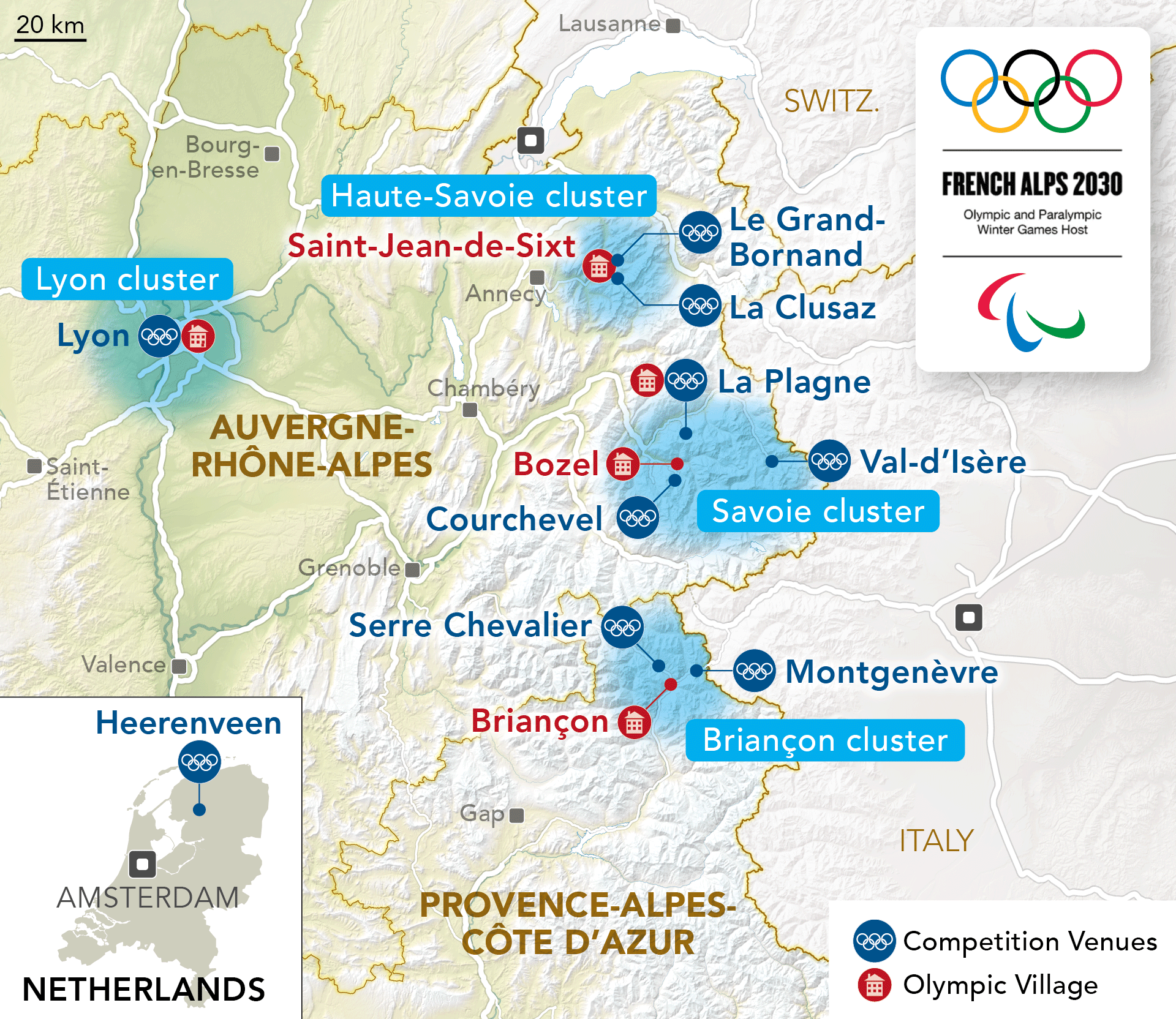
Map of the 2030 Winter Olympics venues

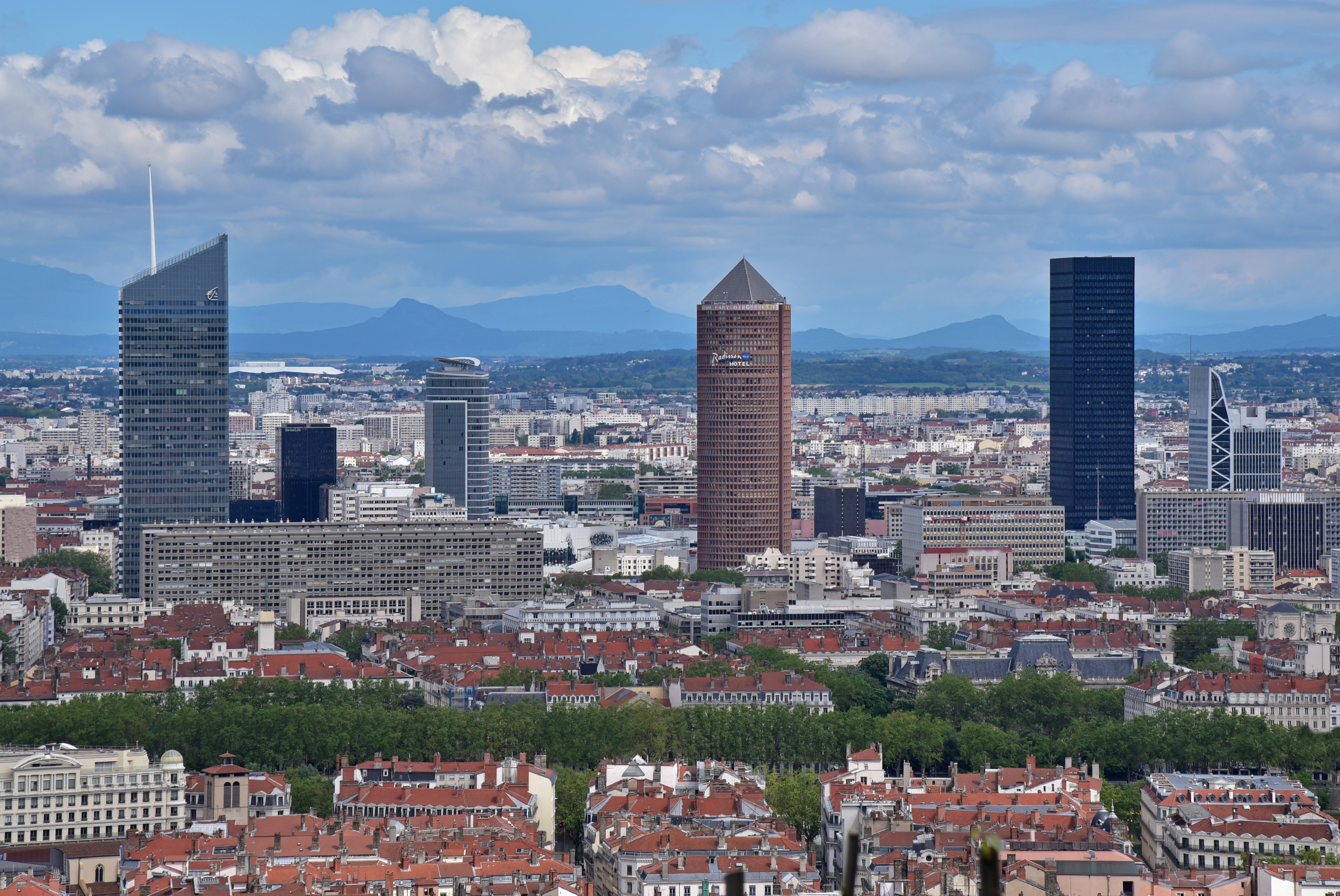
Lyon will host the indoor ice events during the Games (except speed skating)

In March 2026, it was reported that president of the regional council of Provence-Alpes-Côte d'Azur, Renaud Muselier had threatened to withdraw Nice, have their events held in Lyon instead if newly elected mayor of Nice, Éric Ciotti does not accept to the original plans. Renaud had considered Parc Olympique Lyonnais to host the opening and closing ceremonies, the neighbouring LDLC Arena hosting ice hockey, and Eurexpo hosting the rest of the ice sports. On 1 April, the recently reelected mayor of Lyon, Grégory Doucet, would announce that his city was ready to host ice sports. One day later, the president of the regional council of Auvergne-Rhône-Alpes, Fabrice Pannekoucke, denounced Grégory's "cuckoo approach".

On 28 April 2026, the organising committee announced that after exploring the possibility of having ice hockey held on temporary rinks at Allianz Riviera (as doing such would require its tennant, OGC Nice, to vacate for up to nine months), as well as Stade Charles-Ehrmann and Stade Marcel-Volot, and determining them to be too costly or logistically challenging to implement, they would move the matches to existing venues outside of Nice. A bidding phase was launched two days later; Lyon and Paris expressed interest prior, while Albertville, Gap, Grenoble and Marseille were invited to bid. During a meeting in May 2026, the IOC warned the organisers that they would step in and remove ice hockey from Nice if the men's and women's events were to be geographically dispersed, in the consideration of minimising travel and carbon emissions. This reprimand occurred after the International Ice Hockey Federation complained about the distance between venues.

On 29 May 2026, the organising committee announced that Lyon was now "the best solution" to host ice events after Nice mayor Eric Ciotti rejecting the conversion of Allianz Riviera for ice hockey, and pressure from the IOC to adopt a more compact venue cluster. Meanwhile in June 2026, a tentative Lyon venue plan was announced, with LDLC Arena and Eurexpo listed for ice hockey, Halle Tony Garnier for figure skating and short-track speed skating, and Palais des Sports de Gerland for curling. The final venue plan will be announced later in 2026. On 22 June 2026, the IOC Executive Board approved the first set of changes to the venue masterplan. The board also approved hosting long-track speed skating at Thialf. On 16 September, the final venue masterplan was approved. In Lyon Metropolis, Halle Tony Garnier would now host preliminary ice hockey games, and figure skating and short-track speed skating would be moved to Eurexpo. In addition, the events for alpine skiing were allocated.

==== Ceremonies venue ====
A venue for the ceremonies has currently not yet been decided, but organising committee head Edgar Grospiron suggested in an interview with Le Monde that the ceremonies may be held in the Metropolis of Lyon; the organising committee's headquarters are based at Parc Olympique Lyonnais in Décines-Charpieu. The President of the Regional Council of Provence-Alpes-Côte d'Azur, Renaud Muselier, had also shared the idea of hosting the closing ceremony at a part of the Lac de Serre-Ponçon, but this has not been looked into by the organising committee.

Towards the end of June 2026, the Mayor of Lyon, Grégory Doucet, suggested having an open-air opening ceremony within the city, similar to what was done in Paris for the 2024 Summer Olympics. The president of the regional council of Provence-Alpes-Côte d'Azur, Renaud Muselier, also suggeted having the closing ceremony held at the Stade Vélodrome in Marseille.

==== Speed skating venue ====
At that time, the only sport that had not yet have a confirmed venue is long-track speed skating; in April 2025, Grospiron told Le Figaro that it would be too expensive to build a new venue for speed skating, and explained that the organising committee was aiming to "reinvent the Games". The committee has explored various options, including renovating existing facilities in Albertville or Grenoble, or hosting the event outside of the country at either Oval Lingotto in Turin, Italy (which previously hosted long-track speed skating at the 2006 Winter Olympics, and is the closest existing venue outside of the host regions), or Thialf in Heerenveen, Netherlands. On 11 May 2026, the organising committee decided to pursue exclusive talks with Heerenveen about hosting the speed skating events. On 29 June, Thialf was confirmed as the speed skating venue, meaning that speed skating will take place outside of France.

==== Lyon Metropolis cluster ====
Venue	Events	Capacity	Status
LDLC Arena	Ice hockey (preliminaries and finals)	10,500-11,000	Existing
Eurexpo	Figure skating	TBA	Existing with temporary stands
Eurexpo	Short-track speed skating	TBA	Existing with temporary stands
Eurexpo	Curling	TBA	Existing with temporary stands
Halle Tony Garnier	Ice hockey (preliminaries)	TBA	Existing with temporary stands

==== Briançon cluster ====
Venue	Events	Capacity	Status
Serre Chevalier	Freestyle skiing (aerials, moguls, big air)	3,500–5,000	Existing, renovated
Serre Chevalier	Snowboarding (big air)	3,500–5,000	Existing, renovated
Montgenèvre	Freestyle skiing (ski cross, halfpipe, slopestyle)	3,500–5,000	Existing, renovated
Montgenèvre	Snowboarding (snowboard cross, halfpipe, slopestyle, parallel giant slalom)	3,500–5,000	Existing, renovated
Montgenèvre	Ski mountaineering	3,500–5,000	Existing, renovated

==== Savoie cluster ====
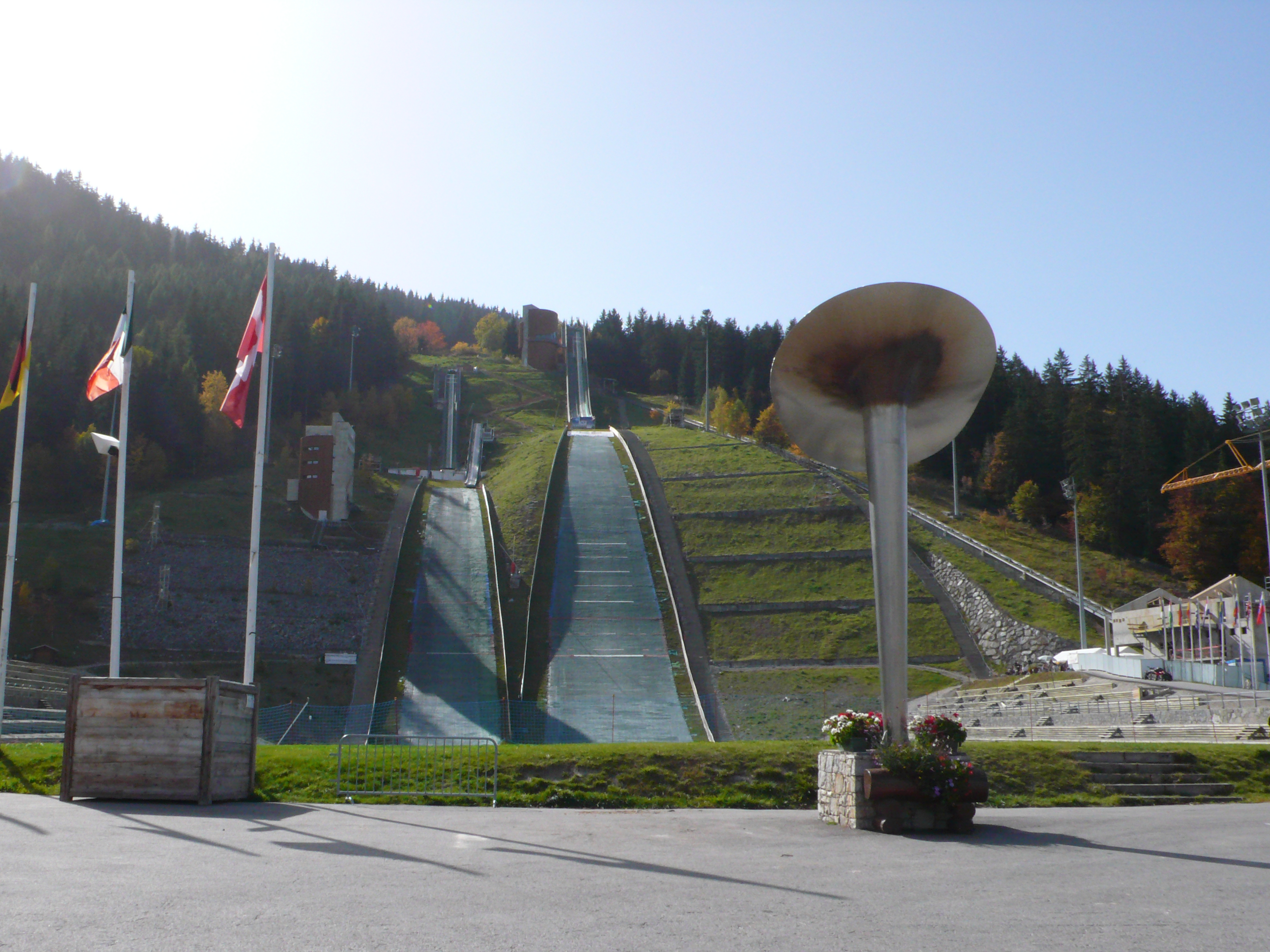
View of the Tremplin du Praz, previously used during the 1992 Winter Olympics

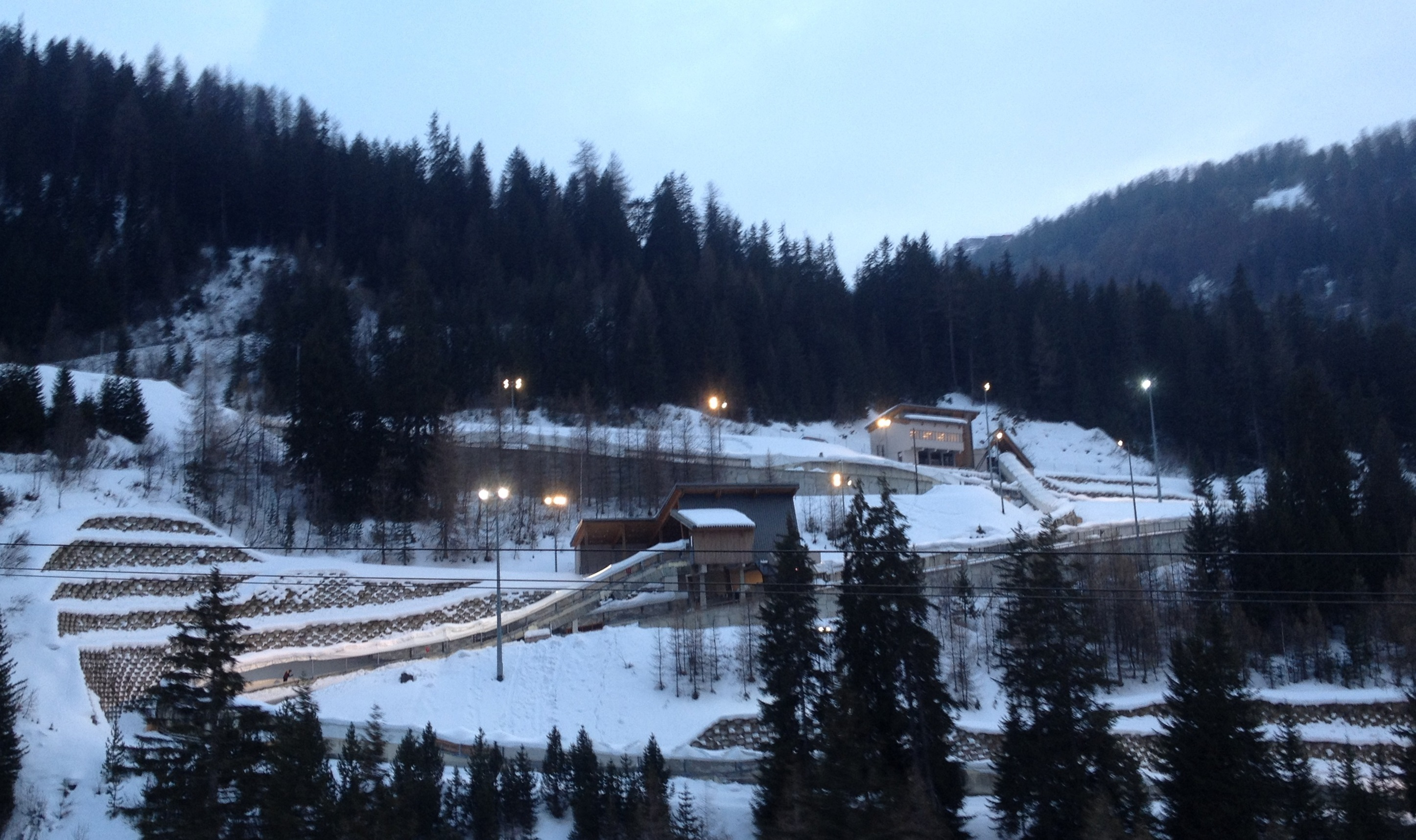
View of La Plagne bobsleigh track, previously used during the 1992 Winter Olympics and which will be reused.

Venue	Events	Capacity	Status
La Plagne	Bobsleigh	15,000–16,000	Existing, renovated
La Plagne	Luge	15,000–16,000	Existing, renovated
La Plagne	Skeleton	15,000–16,000	Existing, renovated
Courchevel	Alpine skiing (speed)	TBA	Existing
Tremplin du Praz	Ski jumping	TBA	Existing
Val-d'Isère	Alpine skiing (technical)	TBA	Existing

==== Haute-Savoie cluster ====
Venue	Events	Capacity	Status
La Clusaz	Cross-country skiing	12,500	Existing
Le Grand-Bornand	Biathlon	12,000–15,000	Existing

==== Outlying venues ====
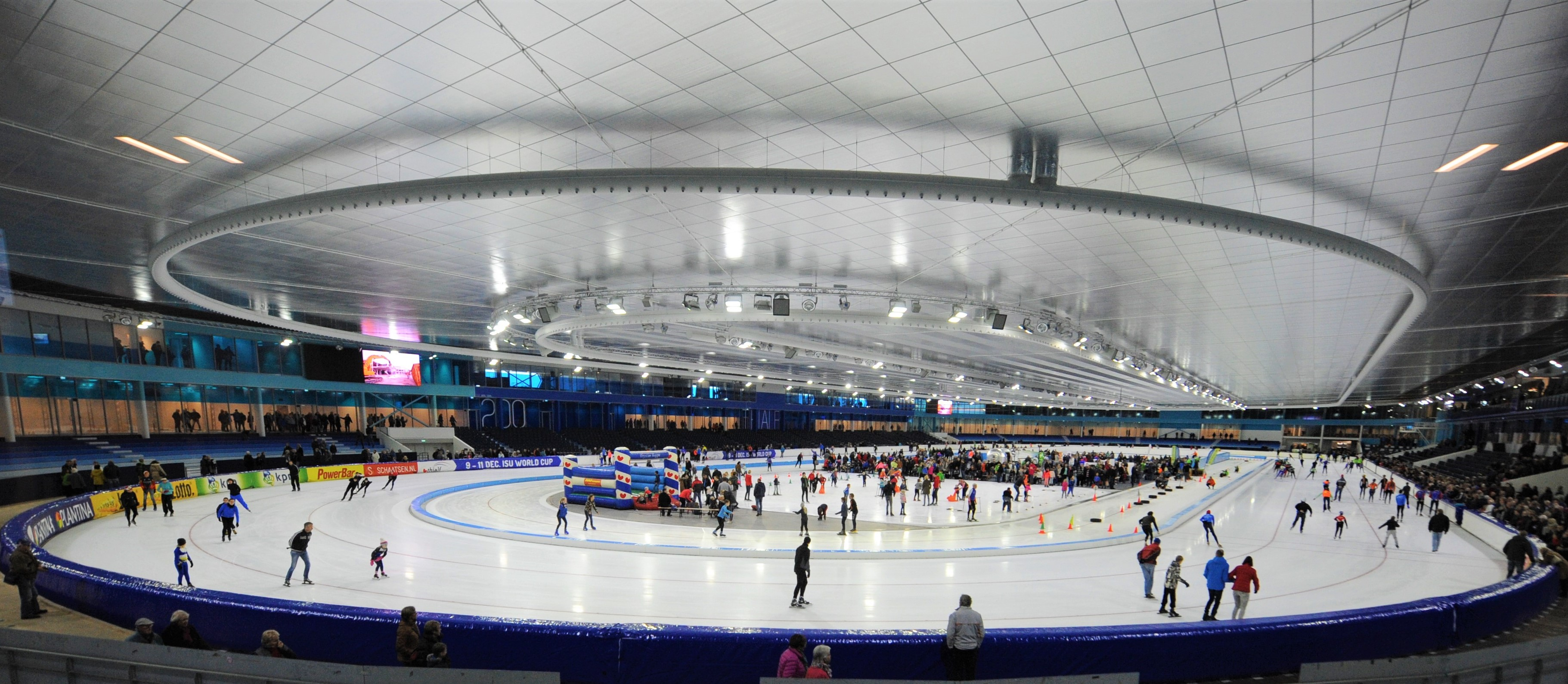
Thialf, in the Netherlands, will host the speed skating events as an outlying venue.

City/Country	Venue	Events	Capacity	Status
Heerenveen, Netherlands	Thialf	Speed skating	12,500	Existing

== The Games ==
=== Sports ===
The Games will feature a record 126 medal events in 8 sports comprising 17 disciplines, including 56 events for women, 55 events for men, and 15 mixed events.

At the 142nd IOC Session in July 2024, the IOC's delegates ratified the core Winter Olympic programme of biathlon, bobsleigh, curling, ice hockey, luge, skating, and skiing. On 9 June 2026, the organising committee proposed the inclusion of ski mountaineering as an optional event, returning from its debut in 2026. The proposal was ratified at the 146th IOC Session on 25 June 2026; individual events will be added alongside the existing sprint and team relay events contested in 2026.

The full event programme was announced on 7 July 2026; several new events and disciplines will be added, including freeride freestyle skiing and snowboard, synchronized skating in figure skating, single mixed relay in biathlon, mixed team ski cross in freestyle skiing, women's super team in ski jumping, mixed team parallel giant slalom in snowboard, and men's and women's team sprint in speed skating. After having been featured in every Winter Olympics since 1924, Nordic combined was dropped from the Winter Olympics programme due to declining interest.

- Alpine skiing (10)
- Biathlon (12)
- Bobsleigh (4)
- Cross-country skiing (12)
- Curling (3)
- Figure skating (6)
- Freeride (4)
- Freestyle skiing (16)
- Ice hockey (2)
- Luge (5)
- Short track speed skating (9)
- Skeleton (3)
- Ski jumping (7)
- Ski mountaineering
  - Individual (2)
  - Sprint (3)
- Snowboarding (12)
- Speed skating (16)

==== Proposed events ====
Various sanctioning bodies had announced plans to pursue bids for sports to be added to the 2030 Winter Olympics:

- On 1 November 2024, the International Ice Hockey Federation (IIHF) announced they were preparing to bid for the inclusion of 3x3 ice hockey, a discipline that has been featured in the Winter Youth Olympics since 2020. If selected, the venue would have been a new €58 million ice hockey arena being built in Chamonix.
- The UCI pursued the addition of cyclo-cross, while World Athletics pursued the revival of cross country running (which was previously contested as a Summer Olympic event) for the first time since 1924. In June 2025, the Departmental Council of Haute-Saône suggested that La Planche des Belles Filles (which has been used as part of the Tour de France route since 2012) would be used as the site for cyclo-cross if approved. Organising committee president Michel Barnier has supported the inclusion of cyclo-cross, while World Athletics president Sebastian Coe stated that cross-country running would provide new opportunities for African athletes to win a Winter Olympic medal for the first time. The Winter Olympic Federations (WOF) voiced opposition to the two sports, arguing that they did not constitute "snow and ice sports" as required by the Olympic Charter, and that their inclusion could "dilute" the heritage and identity of the Winter Olympics; both sports are typically held in the autumn and winter months and have been contested in winter conditions.
- In February 2025, it was reported that the International Climbing and Mountaineering Federation (UIAA) was receiving calls from French athletes to pursue ice climbing for the 2030 Winter Olympics. Champagny-en-Vanoise, near Courchevel in the northern French Alps, has hosted the UIAA Ice Climbing World Cup numerous times, and the venue for it has been recently renovated to be able to host larger scale competitions. On 3 June 2026, the International Climbing and Mountaineering Federation and the Fédération Française des clubs alpins et de montagne released a statement that ice climbing would not be included in the proposal for additional sports, despite it being praised by the organising committee.
- In March 2026, Wallace Casper, program director for the Big Sky Ski Education Foundation in Utah, suggested that freeriding could become a sport at the Winter Olympics due to its growing popularity. The founder of the Freeride World Tour, Nicolas Hale-Woods, said in 2025 that the IOC had previously considered the inclusion of freeriding due to its appeal "to a young audience", in vain to the inclusion of urban sports in the Summer Olympic Games. Chamonix, Tignes and Val Thorens have previously hosted events part of the Freeride World Tour.

In a February 2025 interview, organising committee head Edgar Grospiron mentioned cyclo-cross, cross-country running, speed skiing, telemark skiing and ice cross as potential new sports, as well as a potential return of ski mountaineering, which was planned to debut as an optional sport in 2026. On 7 May 2026, the IOC Executive Board ruled out the possibility of including sports that are not contested on snow or ice in the programme, but it would consider reviewing the prospect after the Games.

== Marketing ==
=== Emblem ===
The emblem of the Games was unveiled on 18 June 2026 during an event at Briançon. The emblem is a stylised mountain peak with a blue, purple, and red gradient, formed by rays of light; it is stated to represent the "promise of clarity, warmth and renewal" and the "convergence" of nations at its summit. The Paralympic emblem uses a similar design, but with the mountain formed in negative space by lights shining behind it. Alongside the emblem, the branding of the Games was also shortened from "French Alps 2030"/"Alpes Françaises 2030" to simply "Alpes 2030". The emblems were designed by Paris based design agency Saint-Lazare. The project is called Under the light of the mountains, we can inspire the world

=== Corporate sponsorship ===
Sponsors of the 2030 Winter Olympics
Worldwide Olympic Partners
- AB InBev (Corona Cero)
- Allianz
- Coca-Cola-Mengniu Dairy
- Deloitte
- JPMorganChase
- Omega SA
- TCL Technology
- Visa Inc.
Founding Partners
- Électricité de France

== Broadcasting rights ==
In France, pay television and streaming rights are owned by Skydance Corporation via Eurosport, with free-to-air coverage owned by France Télévisions under a sublicense agreement with the European Broadcasting Union (EBU). On 16 January 2023, the IOC announced that it had renewed its European broadcast rights agreement with Warner Bros. Discovery, one of the processor of Skydance Corporation. The agreement, covering from 2026 to 2032, includes pay television and streaming rights to the Summer, Winter, and Youth Olympics on Eurosport and Discovery+ in 49 European territories. Free-to-air rights packages were concurrently awarded to the EBU and its members to cover at least 100 hours of each Winter Olympics, with EBU member France Télévisions agreeing to broadcast the Games in France. On October 6, the boardcast rights folded into Skydance Global Sports Group as result of merging between Warner Bros. Discovery and Paramount Skydance.

Territory	Rights holder	Ref
Albania	RTSH	
Australia	Nine	
Austria	ORF	
Belgium	RTBF, VRT	
Brazil	Grupo Globo	
Bulgaria	BNT	
Canada	CBC/Radio-Canada	
Central and Southeast Asia	Infront Sports & Media	
China	CMG	
Croatia	HRT	
Czech Republic	ČT	
Denmark	DR, TV 2	
Estonia	ERR	
Europe (except Russia and Belarus)	EBU, Skydance Global Sports Group	
Finland	Yle	
France	France Télévisions	
Georgia	GPB	
Germany	ARD, ZDF	
Greece	ERT	
Hungary	MTVA	
Iceland	RÚV	
Ireland	RTÉ	
Israel	Sports Channel	
Italy	RAI	
Japan	Japan Consortium	
Kosovo	RTK	
Latin America (Note: Except Brazil)	América Móvil	
Latvia	LTV	
Lithuania	LRT	
Mexico	TelevisaUnivision	
Montenegro	RTCG	
Netherlands	NOS	
New Zealand	Sky	
Norway	NRK	
Poland	TVP	
San Marino	RAI	
Slovakia	STVR	
Slovenia	RTV	
Spain	RTVE	
Sweden	SVT	
Switzerland and Liechtenstein	SRG SSR	
Ukraine	Suspilne	
United Kingdom	BBC	
United States	NBCUniversal	

== Concerns and controversies ==
=== Impacts of climate change ===
The impacts of climate change have become a central focus of the International Olympic Committee in planning the Winter Olympics. According to the IOC, the number of NOCs capable of hosting the Winter Olympics—which require access to snow competition venues with adequate temperature and snowfall—will decline to "practically just 10-12" by mid-century. As a result of these challenges, the decision on the 2030 Winter Olympics host reunion was delayed until 24 July 2024 to allow the IOC more time to carefully plan the future of the Winter Olympics.

=== Organisational issues ===
The president of the Games' organising committee, former Olympian Edgar Grospiron, was appointed in 2025. The organising committee has been plagued with infighting, with the Games' director general, chief operating officer, communications director, and chief of the remuneration committee resigning between 2025 and 2026. In addition, the cost of the event has been a source of controversy, especially in amidst the sharp increase in the amount of French public debt. The Games' budget is an estimated US$4.04 billion, an increase from the original preliminary estimate of US$2.3 billion. The proposed Nice ice arena has faced criticism due to rising costs and budgetary concerns in the lead-up to the 2026 Nice municipal election; it is slated to cost nearly €138 million.

The election of Éric Ciotti as mayor of Nice in 2026, and his subsequent opposition to the conversion of the Allianz Riviera stadium to become an ice hockey rink for the 2030 Winter Olympics, caused the ice events to be moved to Lyon.

== See also ==
- 2030 Winter Paralympics
- Olympic Games held in France
  - 1900 Summer Olympics – Paris
  - 1924 Summer Olympics – Paris
  - 1924 Winter Olympics – Chamonix
  - 1968 Winter Olympics – Grenoble
  - 1992 Winter Olympics – Albertville
  - 2024 Summer Olympics – Paris
  - 2030 Winter Olympics – French Alps
- List of IOC country codes

Winter Olympics
Preceded by Milan–Cortina d'Ampezzo	XXVI Olympic Winter Games; Alpes; 2030	Succeeded by Utah
