= Duncan McPhee =

British middle-distance runner

Personal information
- Nationality: British (Scottish)
- Born: 17 October 1892 Paisley, Scotland
- Died: 22 September 1950 (aged 57) Paisley, Scotland

Sport
- Sport: Middle-distance running
- Event: 1500 metres
- Club: Clydesdale Harriers; West of Scotland Harriers

Duncan McPhee (17 October 1892 – 22 September 1950) was a British and Scottish middle-distance runner who competed at the 1920 Summer Olympics.

== Career ==
McPhee won the Scottish mile championship, when a member of the Clydesdale Harriers before World War I. McPhee finished third behind George Hutson in the 1 mile event at the 1914 AAA Championships.

After the war, McPhee had left the Clydesdale Harriers for the West of Scotland Harriers and finished second behind Frenchman Armand Burtin in the 1 mile event at the 1920 AAA Championships. The following month at the 1920 Olympic Games held in Antwerp, Belgium, McPhee was selected by Scotland, where he competed in the men's 1500 metres.

McPhee finally became the national 1 mile champion after winning the British AAA Championships title at the 1922 AAA Championships, although he was considered the British champion in 1920 by virtue of being the best placed British athlete.
