= Konosuke Sano =

Japanese long-distance runner

Personal information
- Nationality: Japanese
- Born: 9 September 1894 Ōtsu, Japan

Sport
- Sport: Long-distance running
- Event: 5000 metres

Konosuke Sano (佐野 幸之助, Sano Kōnosuke; born 9 September 1894, date of death unknown) was a Japanese long-distance runner. He competed in the men's 5000 metres at the 1920 Summer Olympics.
