= Panagiotis Trivoulidas =

Greek long-distance runner

Personal information
- Nationality: Greek
- Born: 10 January 1891 Sparta, Greece
- Died: 1970 (aged 78–79)

Sport
- Sport: Long-distance running
- Event: Marathon

Panagiotis Trivoulidas (10 January 1891 – 1970) was a Greek long-distance runner. He competed in the marathon and the individual cross country events at the 1920 Summer Olympics. He also won the Boston Marathon in 1920.
