= James Hatton =

British long-distance runner

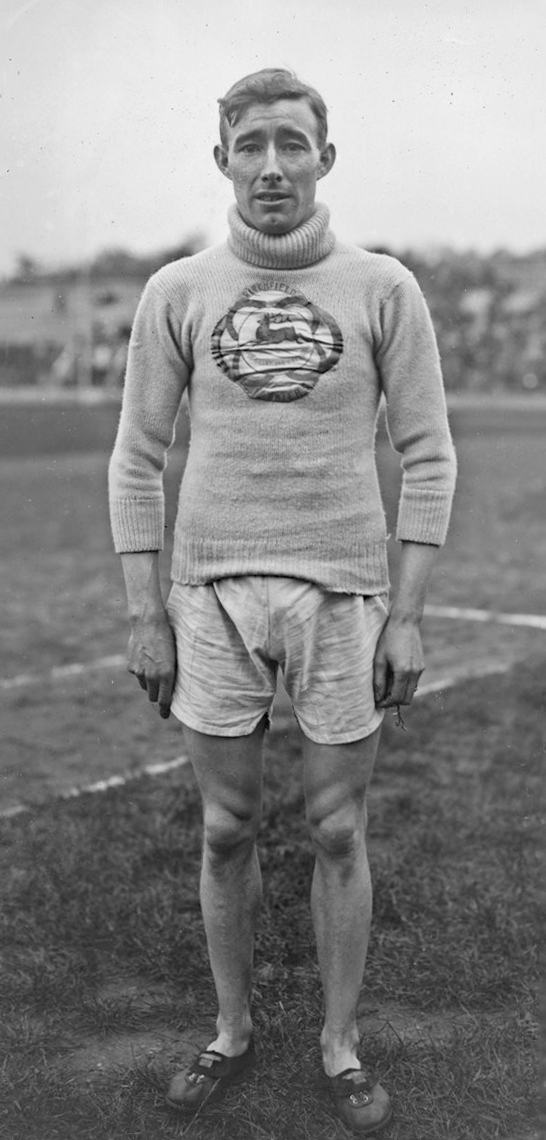
- James Hatton in 1922

Personal information
- Born: 1897 Retford, Nottinghamshire, England

Sport
- Sport: Athletics
- Event: 3,000–10,000 m
- Club: Surrey AC

Achievements and titles
- Personal bests: 3000 m – 9:00.6 (1920); 5000 m – 15:29.0 (1922); 10,000 m – 32:13.3e (1920)

James Hatton also referred to as Jack Hatton (born 1897, date of death unknown) was a British long-distance runner who competed at the 1920 Summer Olympics.

== Career ==
At the 1920 Olympic Games, he finished fifth in the 10,000 m final and tenth in the 3,000 m race, in which Great Britain won the silver team medal. Hatton did not receive a medal because only three best runners from a team were counted; Hatton was fourth.

Hatton finished second behind Walter Monk in the 4 miles event at the 1921 AAA Championships and fourth in the one mile. Hatton was the Northern Counties champion over 10 miles in 1920 and 4 miles in 1921; the same year, he won the 3 miles at the Kinnaird international meeting and the 4 miles at the Triangular International.

Hatton emigrated to Australia in 1923 and set several Australian records. He won the NSW state championship in 1926 and was a member of Manly AC.
