= Rudolf Falk =

Swedish long-distance runner

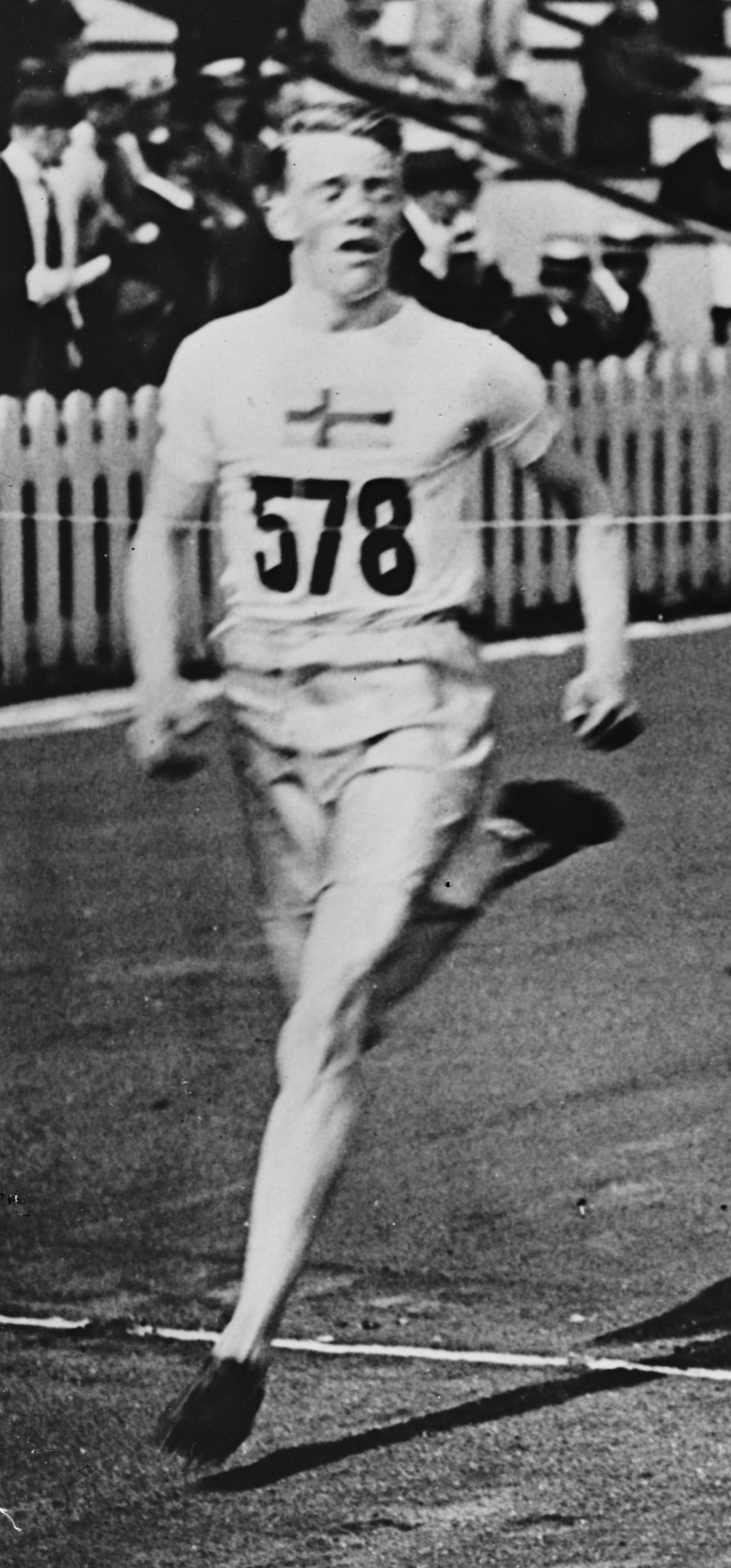
- Rudolf Falk winning a 5,000m semi-final of the 1920 Olympics.

Personal information
- Nationality: Swedish
- Born: 7 January 1898 Stockholm, Sweden
- Died: 6 September 1988 (aged 90) Stockholm, Sweden

Sport
- Sport: Long-distance running
- Event: 5000 metres

Rudolf Falk (7 January 1898 – 6 September 1988) was a Swedish long-distance runner. He competed in the men's 5000 metres at the 1920 Summer Olympics.
