= Tomeichi Ohura =

Japanese long-distance runner

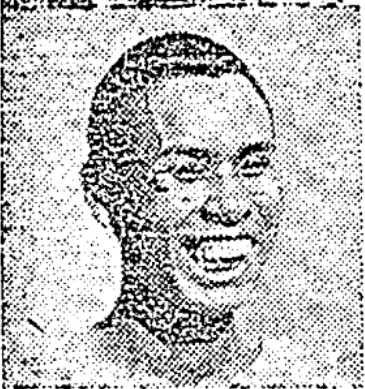
- Ohura in 23 years old

Personal information
- Nationality: Japanese
- Born: 6 March 1896 Utazu, Kagawa, Japan
- Died: August 28, 1989 (aged 93)

Sport
- Sport: Long-distance running
- Event: 5000 metres

Tomeichi Ohura (大浦 留市, Ōhura Tomeichi; 6 March 1896 – 1989) was a Japanese long-distance runner. He competed in the men's 5000 metres at the 1920 Summer Olympics.
