= Abdul Ali Maghoub =

Egyptian long-distance runner

Personal information
- Nationality: Egyptian

Sport
- Sport: Long-distance running
- Event: 5000 metres

Abdul Ali Maghoub was an Egyptian long-distance runner. He competed in the men's 5000 metres at the 1920 Summer Olympics.
