= Hannes Miettinen =

Finnish long-distance runner

Personal information
- Nationality: Finnish
- Born: 25 September 1893 Helsinki, Grand Duchy of Finland
- Died: 2 January 1968 (aged 74) Helsinki, Finland

Sport
- Sport: Athletics
- Event: Long-distance running

Hannes Miettinen (25 September 1893 – 2 January 1968) was a Finnish athlete. He competed in the men's individual cross country event at the 1920 Summer Olympics.
