= Arlie Schardt =

American long-distance runner

Medal record

Men's athletics

Representing the United States

Olympic Games
Gold medal – first place	1920 Antwerp	3000 meter team

Arlie Schardt (Alfred E. Schardt; April 24, 1895 – March 2, 1980) was an American athlete who competed mainly in the 3000 metre team. He was born in Milwaukee, Wisconsin and died in Clearwater, Florida.

Schardt competed for the United States in the 1920 Summer Olympics held in Antwerp, Belgium in the 3000 metre team where he won the gold medal with his teammates Horace Brown and Ivan Dresser.
