= Henrik Sørensen (athlete) =

Danish long-distance runner

Personal information
- Nationality: Danish
- Born: 27 May 1897 Ringsted, Denmark
- Died: 19 February 1976 (aged 78) Hvidovre, Denmark

Sport
- Sport: Athletics
- Event: Long-distance running

Henrik Sørensen (27 May 1897 – 19 February 1976) was a Danish athlete. He competed in the men's individual cross country event at the 1920 Summer Olympics.
