= Anton Hegarty =

Irish cross-country runner

Medal record

Men's athletics

Representing Great Britain

Olympic Games
| Silver medal – second place | 1920 Antwerp | Cross country team |

Anthony "Anton" Hegarty (14 December 1892 – 10 August 1944) was an Irish cross country athlete. He twice represented Ireland at the International Cross Country Championships.

Hegarty was born on 14 December 1892, in Derry, Ireland, the son of Isabel (Isabella) and John Hegarty. He competed for Great Britain at the 1920 Summer Olympics held in Antwerp, Belgium, in the Cross Country Team where he won the silver medal with his teammates James Wilson and Alfred Nichols after finishing fifth in the individual cross country event. He died in Rugby, England in 1944.
