= Josef Holsner =

Swedish long-distance runner

Personal information
- Full name: Josef Christian Holsner
- Nationality: Swedish
- Born: 11 February 1894 Gothenburg, Sweden
- Died: 12 October 1969 (aged 75) Gothenburg, Sweden

Sport
- Sport: Middle-distance running
- Event: Steeplechase

Josef Christian Holsner (11 February 1894 – 12 October 1969) was a Swedish middle-distance runner. He competed in the men's 3000 metres steeplechase at the 1920 Summer Olympics.
