= Edmond Bimont =

French long-distance runner

Personal information
- Nationality: French
- Born: 2 November 1897 Livry-Gargan, France
- Died: 25 April 1964 (aged 66)

Sport
- Sport: Athletics
- Event: Long-distance running

Edmond Bimont (2 November 1897 – 25 April 1964) was a French athlete. He competed in the men's individual cross country event at the 1920 Summer Olympics.
