= Bob Crawford (athlete) =

American athlete

Personal information
- Nationality: American
- Born: January 21, 1899 Belfast, Great Britain
- Died: May 18, 1970 (aged 71) Frankenmuth, Michigan, United States

Sport
- Sport: Athletics
- Event: Long-distance running

Bob Crawford (January 21, 1899 – May 18, 1970) was an American athlete. He competed in the men's individual cross country event at the 1920 Summer Olympics.
