= Knut Alm =

Swedish long-distance runner

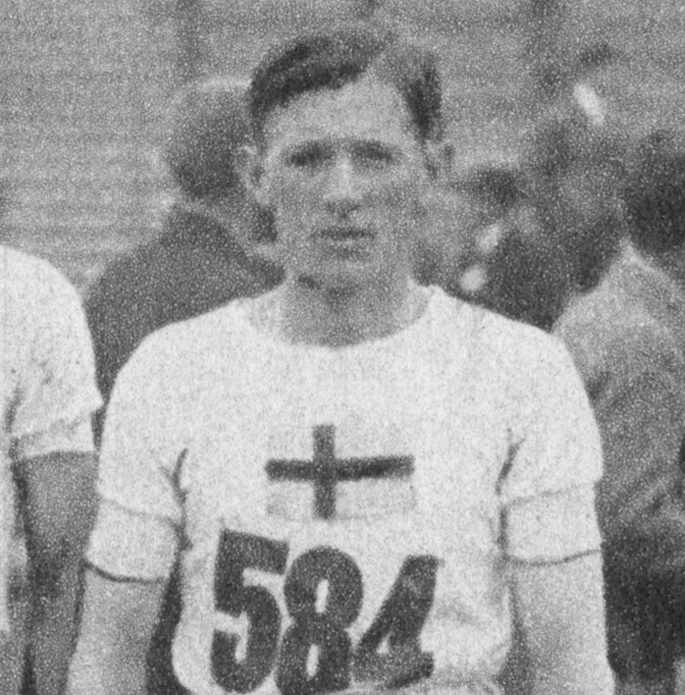

Personal information
- Born: 5 March 1889 Huddinge, Sweden
- Died: 3 June 1969 (aged 80) Bromma, Stockholm, Sweden
- Height: 170 cm (5 ft 7 in)
- Weight: 63 kg (139 lb)

Sport
- Sport: Athletics
- Event(s): 5000 m, 10000 m, cross country
- Club: IK Göta

Achievements and titles
- Personal best(s): 5000 m – 15:54.5 (1915); 10000 m – 32:55.5 (1916)

Knut Emil Willehard Alm (5 March 1889 – 3 June 1969) was a Swedish runner. He competed in cross-country events at the 1920 Summer Olympics and finished 30th individually. Although he was a member of the bronze medal-winning Swedish cross country team, he did not receive a medal because only three best runners from each team were honored, while Hedwall was sixth.
