= Lewis Watson (athlete) =

American long-distance runner

Personal information
- Nationality: American
- Born: June 25, 1895 New Britain, Connecticut, United States
- Died: May 19, 1961 (aged 65) Redwood City, California, United States

Sport
- Sport: Athletics
- Event: Long-distance running

Lewis Watson (June 25, 1895 – May 19, 1961) was an American athlete. He competed in the men's individual cross country event at the 1920 Summer Olympics.
