= Lawrence Shields (runner) =

American athlete

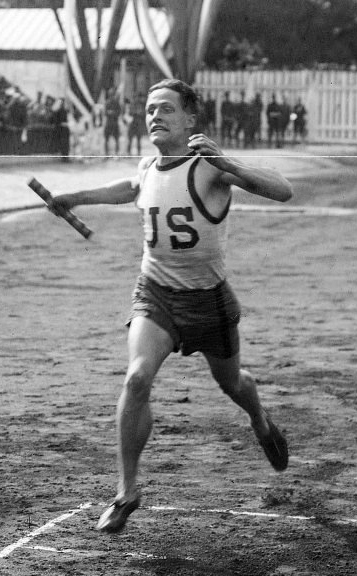
- Shields in 1919

Personal information
- Born: March 5, 1895 West Chester, Pennsylvania, U.S.
- Died: February 19, 1976 (aged 80) Rochester, Minnesota, U.S.
- Education: Pennsylvania State University
- Height: 1.70 m (5 ft 7 in)
- Weight: 64 kg (141 lb)
- Spouse: Ruth Pike Noyes

Sport
- Sport: Athletics
- Event: 1500 m
- Club: Meadowbrook Club, Philadelphia

Achievements and titles
- Personal bests: 1500 m – 4:03.0 (1920); Mile – 4:18.4 (1922)
Medal record
Representing the United States
Olympic Games
Bronze medal – third place	1920 Antwerp	1500 m

Marion Lawrence Shields (March 5, 1895 – February 19, 1976) was an American middle-distance runner who specialized in the 1500 meters. Around the time of the First World War he was a student at Mercersburg Academy and trained under the Scots American coach Jimmy Curran. Thereafter he attended Penn State. At the 1920 Summer Olympics he won a bronze medal in the 1500 m. He was also part of the gold medal-winning American team in the 3000 m race but he was not awarded a medal due to being one of the two weakest links of the team. Four years later Shields attempted to qualify for the Olympic Games in Paris, but failed.

In 1923, Shields began a 37-year-long career at Phillips Andover Academy as a biology teacher, coach, alumni director and member of the board of trustees. Shields fought with the U.S. Navy in World War I and II, retiring in the rank of Commodore in the Pacific.

== See also ==
- List of Pennsylvania State University Olympians
