= Artur Nielsen =

Danish long-distance runner

Personal information
- Nationality: Danish
- Born: 13 June 1898 Næstved, Denmark
- Died: 15 September 1988 (aged 93) Tårnby, Denmark

Sport
- Sport: Long-distance running
- Event: 5000 metres

Artur Nielsen (13 June 1895 – 15 September 1988) was a Danish long-distance runner. He competed in the men's 5000 metres and cross country events at the 1920 Summer Olympics.
