= Armand Burtin =

French middle-distance runner

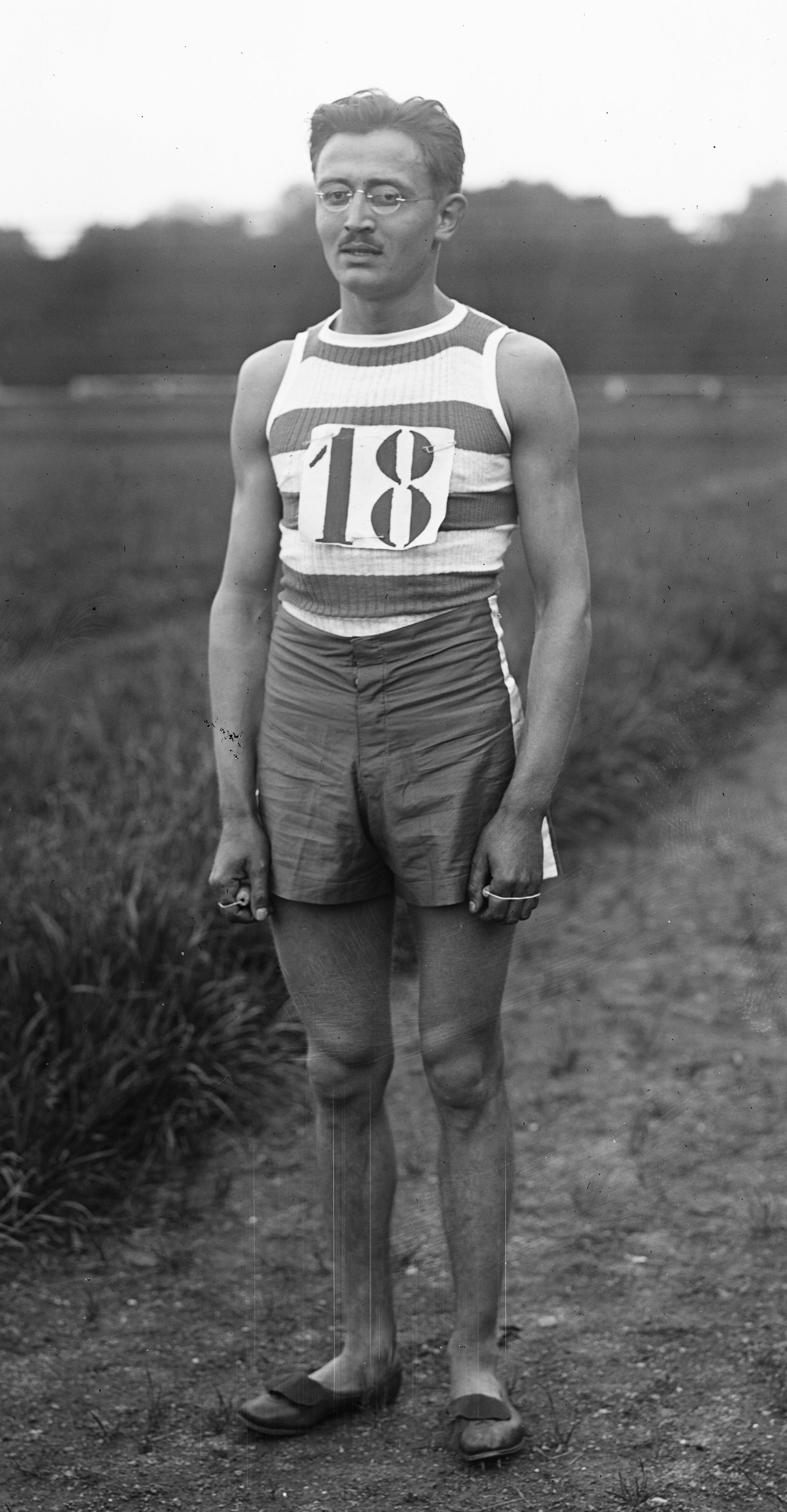
- Armand Burtin in 1920

Personal information
- Born: 3 November 1896
- Died: 13 August 1972 (aged 75)

Sport
- Sport: Athletics
- Events: 1500 m, 3000 m
- Club: Métropolitain Club Colombes

Achievements and titles
- Personal best: 1500 m – 4:03.8 (1920)

Armand Burtin (3 November 1896 – 13 August 1972) was a French middle-distance runner, who competed at the 1920 Summer Olympics and 1924 Summer Olympics.

== Career ==
Burtin won the British AAA Championships title in the 1 mile event at the British 1920 AAA Championships.

The following month at the 1920 Olympic Games held in Antwerp, Belgium, he represented France in the 1500 metres event, but failed to reach the final. He did better in the 3000 metres, finishing fourth.

At the 1924 Olympic Games, Burtin finished eleventh in the individual 3,000 metres event and fourth with the French team.
