= Jón Jónsen =

Icelandic-Danish long-distance runner

Personal information
- Nationality: Danish
- Born: 24 August 1896 Reykjavík, Iceland
- Died: 30 October 1981 (aged 85)

Sport
- Sport: Long-distance running
- Event: 5000 metres

Jón Jónsen (24 August 1896 – 30 October 1981) was an Icelandic long-distance runner. He competed for Denmark in the men's 5000 metres at the 1920 Summer Olympics.
