= Émile Rivez =

Belgian long-distance runner

Personal information
- Nationality: Belgian
- Born: 11 August 1894
- Died: Unknown

Sport
- Sport: Athletics
- Event: Long-distance running

Émile Rivez (born 11 August 1894, date of death unknown) was a Belgian athlete who competed in the men's individual cross country event at the 1920 Summer Olympics.
