= Eric Backman =

Swedish long-distance runner (1896–1965)

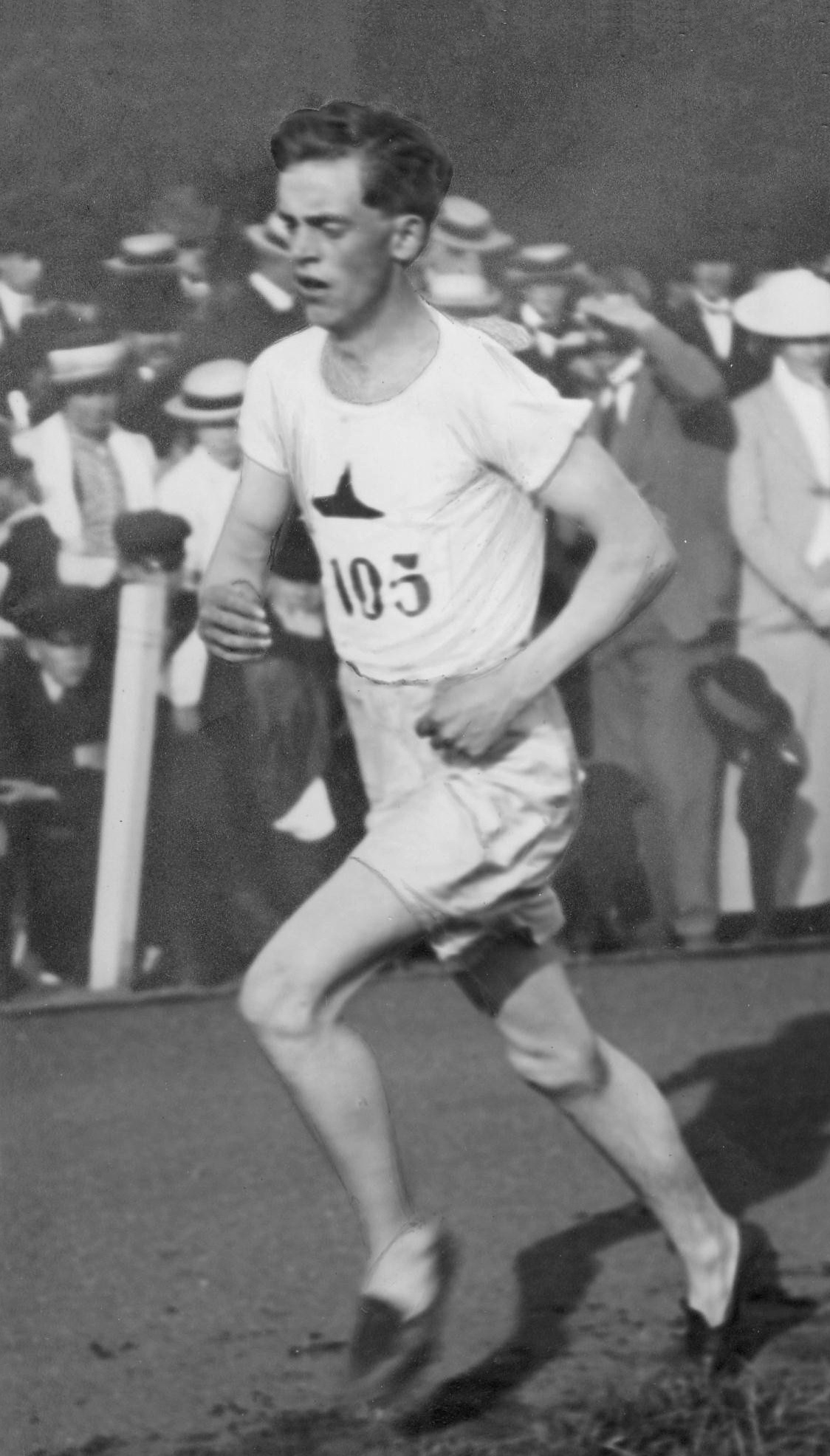

Personal information
- Born: 18 May 1896 Acklinga, Sweden
- Died: 29 June 1965 (aged 69) Skövde, Sweden
- Height: 1.72 m (5 ft 8 in)
- Weight: 64 kg (141 lb)

Sport
- Sport: Athletics
- Event: 3,000–10,000 m
- Club: IFK Tidaholm

Achievements and titles
- Personal bests: 5000 m – 14:51.0 (1919); 10,000 m – 31:02.2 (1921)
Medal record
Representing Sweden
Olympic Games
Silver medal – second place	1920 Antwerp	Individual cross country
Bronze medal – third place	1920 Antwerp	Cross country team
Bronze medal – third place	1920 Antwerp	3000 metre team
Bronze medal – third place	1920 Antwerp	5000 metres

Eric Natanael Backman (18 May 1896 – 29 June 1965) was a Swedish long distance runner who had his best achievements at the 1920 Summer Olympics.

== Career ==
Backman won the British AAA Championships 4 miles title at the 1919 AAA Championships.

The following year at the 1920 Olympic Games, Backman won the silver medal in the 8,000 m cross-country race, 2.6 seconds behind the legendary Paavo Nurmi. This second place helped the Swedish cross-country team to win the bronze medal in the team event behind Finland and Great Britain, as two other team members finished 10th and 11th. This scenario repeated in the 3,000 m event – Backman finished second and the other Swedes 10th and 12th; this time, Backman did not receive an individual medal, but he again pulled up the Swedish team to third place. In the 5,000 metres Backman finished third, again behind Paavo Nurmi.

Backman finished second behind Walter Monk in the 4 miles event at the British 1921 AAA Championships.

Backman was a heavy smoker and enjoyed alcohol, yet he was an eight-time Swedish champion in the 5,000 m and 10,000 m in 1918–23, and held Swedish records over 5,000 m, 10,000 m, 5 miles and one-hour run. After 1943 he worked in the Volvo factory in Skövde.
