= Hilding Ekman =

Swedish long-distance runner

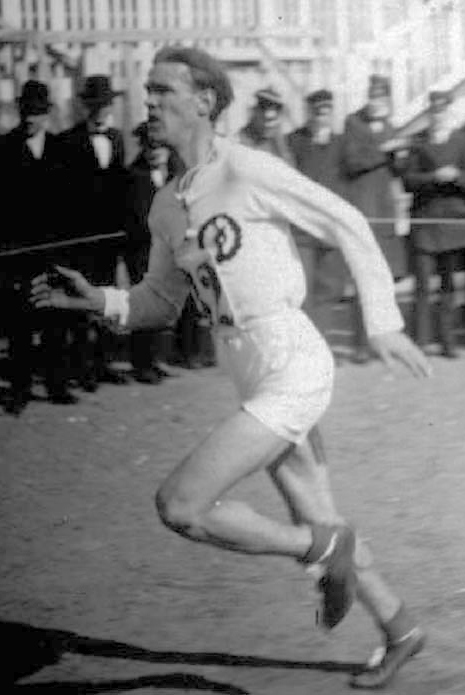

Personal information
- Born: 10 January 1893 Stockholm, Sweden
- Died: 7 March 1966 (aged 73) Uppsala, Sweden
- Height: 180 cm (5 ft 11 in)
- Weight: 70 kg (154 lb)

Sport
- Sport: Athletics
- Event(s): 10000 m, cross country
- Club: IF Thor, Uppsala

Achievements and titles
- Personal best: 10000 m – 33:20.7 (1917)
Medal record
Representing Sweden
Olympic Games
Bronze medal – third place	1920 Antwerp	Cross country team

Hilding Viktor Ekman (10 January 1893 – 7 March 1966) was a Swedish runner who competed at the 1920 Summer Olympics in the cross country events. He finished 11th individually and won a bronze medal with the Swedish team.
