= Heikki Liimatainen (athlete) =

Finnish long-distance runner

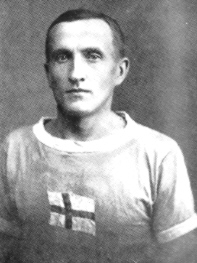
- Heikki Liimatainen at the 1920 Antwerp Olympics.

Personal information
- Nationality: Finnish
- Born: 14 March 1894 Karstula, Finland
- Died: 24 December 1980 (aged 86) Porvoo, Finland
- Height: 1.64 m (5 ft 5 in)
- Weight: 60 kg (132 lb)

Sport
- Sport: Running
- Event: Cross country
Medal record
Olympic Games
Gold medal – first place	1920 Antwerp	Cross country team
Gold medal – first place	1924 Paris	Cross country team
Bronze medal – third place	1920 Antwerp	Individual cross country

Heikki Liimatainen (14 March 1894 – 24 December 1980) was a Finnish athlete who competed mainly in cross country running.

He competed for Finland in the 1920 Summer Olympics held in Antwerp, Belgium where he won the individual bronze medal in cross country running and helped the Finnish team of Paavo Nurmi and Teodor Koskenniemi win gold. He returned four years later to the 1924 Summer Olympics held in Paris, France where he again won the gold medal with Paavo Nurmi and Ville Ritola in the Finnish cross country team.
