= Hal Brown (athlete) =

American long-distance runner (1898–1983)

Medal record

Olympic Games

Men's athletics

Representing the United States
Gold medal – first place	1920 Antwerp	3000 meter team

Horace Hallock "Hal" Brown (March 30, 1898 – December 25, 1983) was an American long-distance runner. He competed for the United States in the 1920 Summer Olympics held in Antwerp, Belgium in the 3000 meter team race where he won the gold medal together with his teammates Arlie Schardt and Ivan Dresser.

Brown won the 1916 New England Intercollegiate Cross Country meet, leading Williams College to the team title. After serving in World War I, he won the two miles at the 1920 IC4A championships in 9:27.6, establishing a Williams College record that stood until 1973. He won the 5000 meters at the 1920 US Olympic trials, qualifying for the Olympics in Antwerp.

He was born in Madison, New Jersey and died in Houston, Texas.
