= Ivan Dresser =

American long-distance runner

Olympic medal record

Men's athletics

Representing the United States
Gold medal – first place	1920 Antwerp	3000 meter team

Ivan Chandler Dresser (July 3, 1896 – December 27, 1956) was an American athlete who competed mainly in the 3000 metre team. He was a 1919 graduate of Cornell University and a member of the Sphinx Head Society. He competed for the United States in the 1920 Summer Olympics held in Antwerp, Belgium in the 3000 metre team where he won the gold medal with his teammates Horace Brown and Arlie Schardt.

He was born in Flandreau, South Dakota and died in New York City. His granddaughter is Mexican political analyst and researcher Denise Dresser.
