= Gustaf Mattsson =

Swedish long-distance runner (1893–1977)

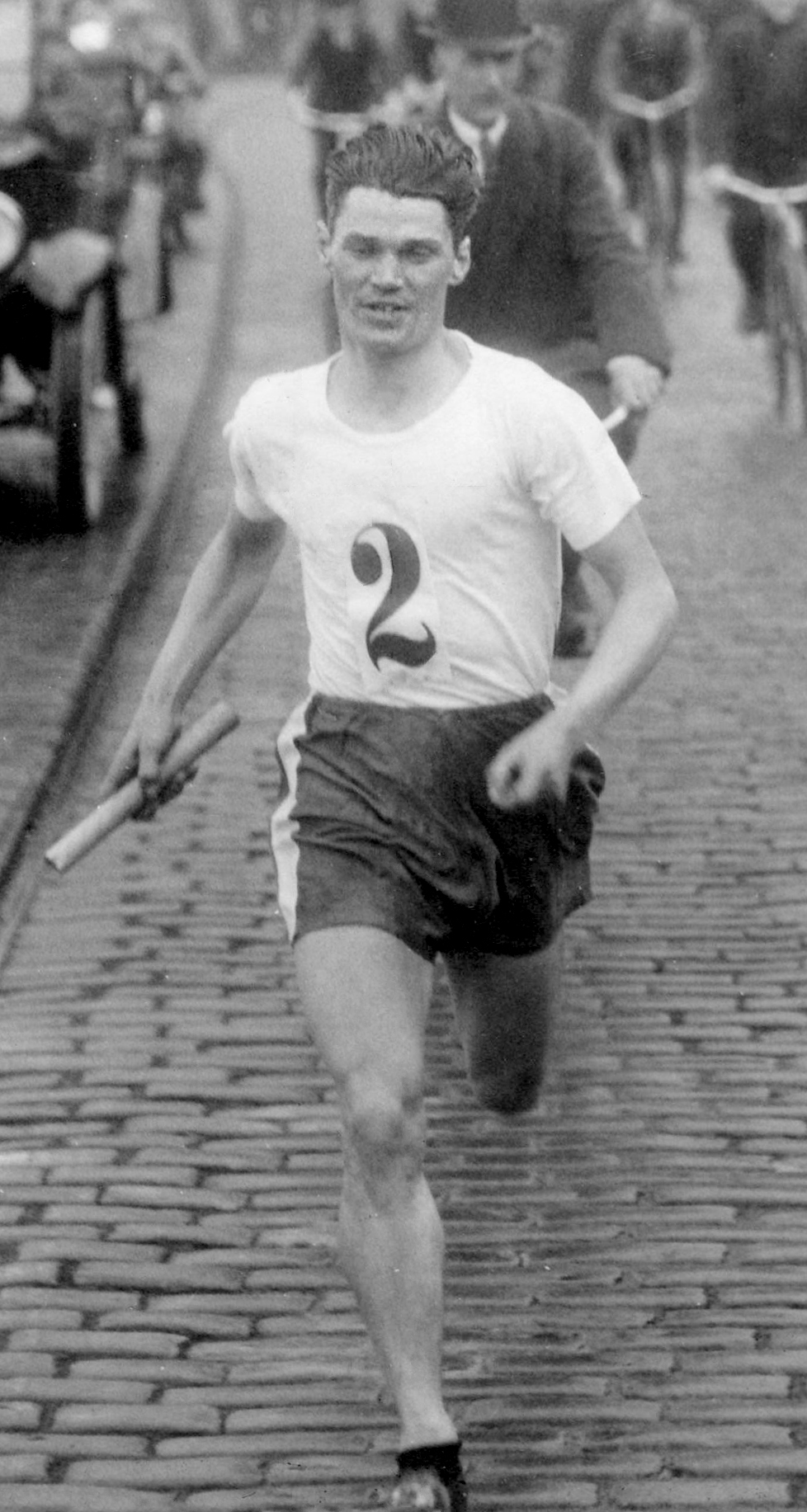

Personal information
- Born: 8 September 1893 Länna, Uppsala Municipality, Sweden
- Died: 15 January 1977 (aged 83) Sundbyberg, Stockholm, Sweden
- Height: 1.69 m (5 ft 7 in)
- Weight: 60 kg (130 lb)

Sport
- Sport: Athletics
- Event: 3,000 m – marathon
- Club: Fredrikshofs IF, Stockholm

Achievements and titles
- Personal best(s): 3000 mS – 10:05.4 (1923); 5000 m – 15:18.7 (1921); 10,000 m – 32:04.2 (1921)
Medal record
Representing Sweden
Olympic Games
Bronze medal – third place	1920 Antwerp	Cross country team

Gustaf Isidor Mattsson (8 September 1893 – 15 January 1977) was a Swedish long-distance runner. He competed at the 1920 Summer Olympics in the 3,000 m steeplechase and 8,000 m cross-country events and finished in fourth and tenth place, respectively. His tenth place earned him a bronze medal with the Swedish team.

Mattsson competed over distances ranging from 3,000 m to marathon and won three Swedish titles over 20 km on the road. He was a businessman by trade.
