= Alfred Nichols =

British long-distance runner

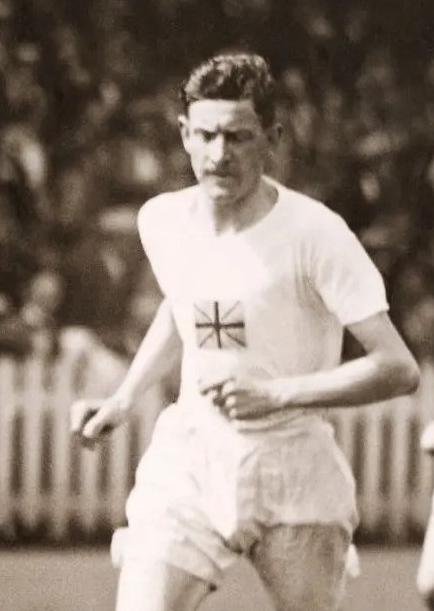

Personal information
- Born: 28 November 1890 London, England
- Died: 31 May 1952 (aged 61) Hammersmith, London, England

Sport
- Sport: Athletics
- Event: middle/long-distance
- Club: Surrey AC
Medal record
Men's athletics
Representing Great Britain
Olympic Games
Silver medal – second place	1920 Antwerp	Cross country team

Alfred Hubert Nichols (28 November 1890 – 1 May 1952) was a British athlete who competed at the 1920 Summer Olympics.

== Career ==
Nichols finished second behind George Hutson in the 4 miles event at the 1914 AAA Championships.

Nicholas was selected to represent Great Britain at the 1920 Summer Olympics held in Antwerp, Belgium, in the Cross Country team event, where he won the silver medal with his team mates James Wilson and Anton Hegarty.
