= Teodor Koskenniemi =

Finnish long-distance runner

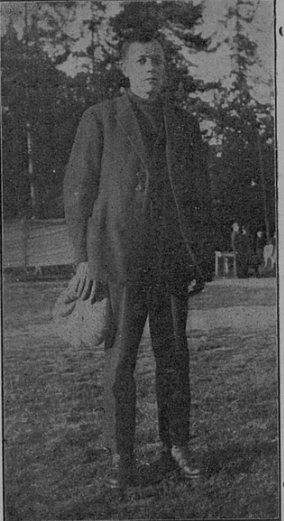

Personal information
- Full name: Fredrik Teodor Koskenniemi
- Nationality: Finnish
- Born: 5 November 1887 Vihti
- Died: 15 March 1965 (aged 77) Vihti
- Height: 1.72 m (5 ft 8 in)
- Weight: 63 kg (139 lb)

Sport
- Sport: Running
- Event: Cross country
Medal record
Olympic Games
Gold medal – first place	1920 Antwerp	Cross country team

Fredrik Teodor Koskenniemi (5 November 1887 – 15 March 1965) was a Finnish athlete who competed mainly in the cross country running during his career. He competed for Finland at the 1920 Summer Olympics held in Antwerp, Belgium where he won the gold medal in the men's cross country team event with his teammates Paavo Nurmi and Heikki Liimatainen.
