= Edmond Brossard =

French runner

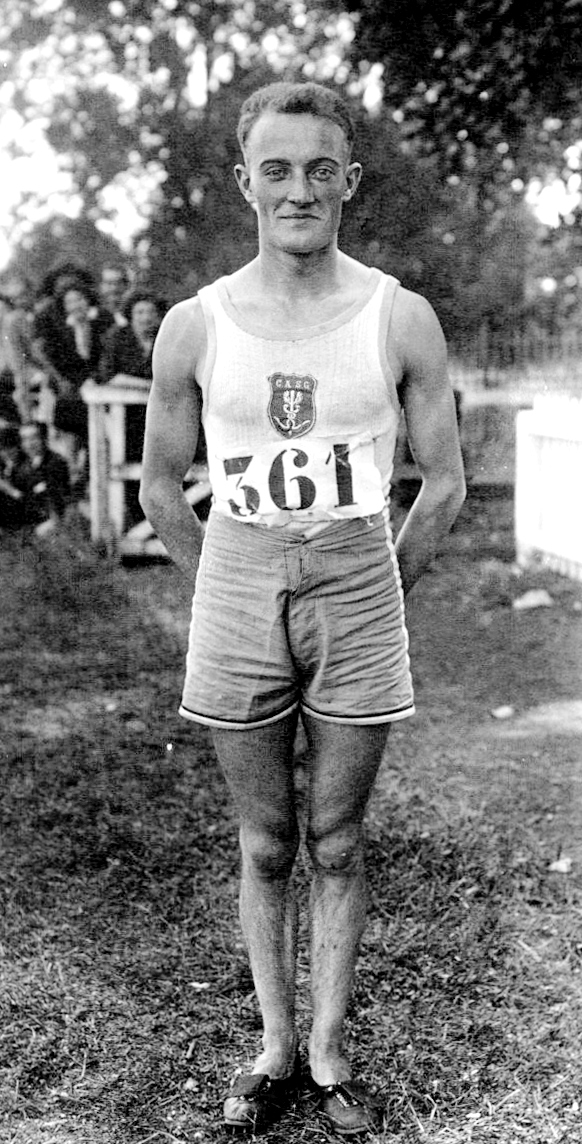
- Edmond Brossard in 1921

Personal information
- Born: 8 July 1900 Ouchamps, France
- Died: 18 July 1991 (aged 91)

Sport
- Sport: Athletics
- Events: Steeplechase, 800 m, 400 m hurdles
- Club: Stade français, Paris; CASG Paris

Achievements and titles
- Olympic finals: 1920 Summer Olympics
- Personal bests: 3000 mS – 10:13.2 (1922); 800 m – 1:56.4 (1921); 400 mH – 59.8 (1918)

Edmond Brossard (8 July 1900 – 18 July 1991) was a French runner who competed at the 1920 Summer Olympics. He finished fourth and fifth in the 3000 m and cross-country team events, respectively, and failed to reach the final of the 3000 m steeplechase event.
