= Carlo Martinenghi =

Italian middle-distance, long-distance and steeplechase runner

Personal information
- Nationality: Italian
- Born: 28 June 1893 Baveno, Italy
- Died: 7 September 1954 (aged 61) Milan, Italy

Sport
- Country: Italy
- Sport: Athletics
- Event: Long-distance running

Carlo Domenico Martinenghi (28 June 1893 – 7 September 1954) was an Italian long-distance runner who competed at the 1920 Summer Olympics and the 1924 Summer Olympics.
