= François Vyncke =

Belgian long-distance runner

Personal information
- Nationality: Belgian
- Born: 9 January 1892

Sport
- Sport: Long-distance running
- Event: 5000 metres

François Vyncke (born 9 January 1892, date of death unknown) was a Belgian long-distance runner. He competed in the men's 5000 metres at the 1920 Summer Olympics.
