= James Wilson (athlete) =

Scottish athlete

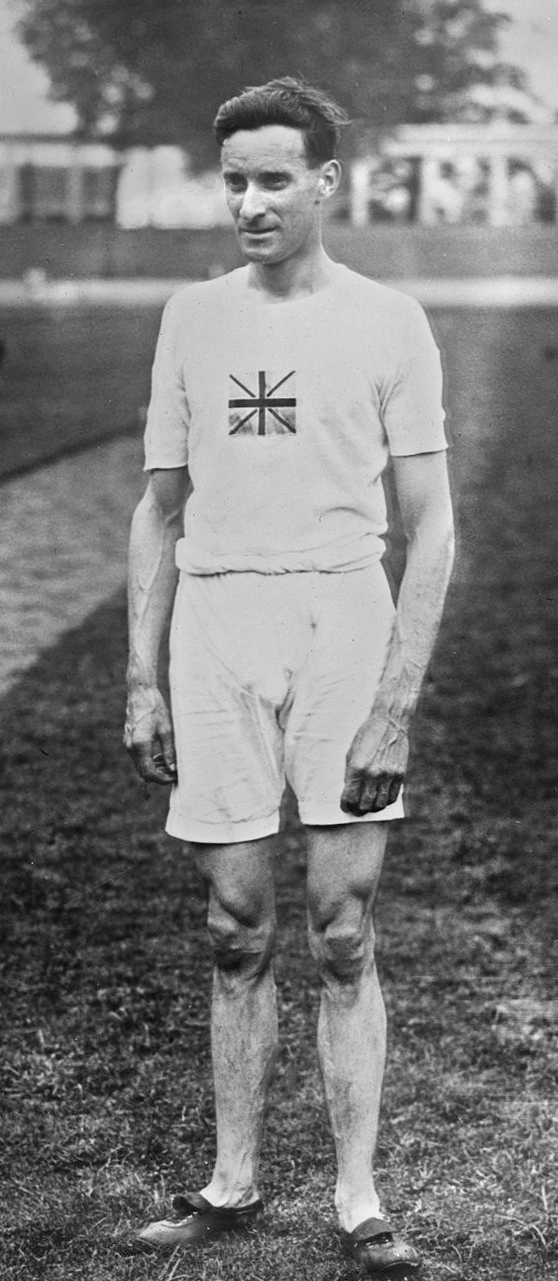
- James Wilson at the 1920 Olympics

Personal information
- Born: 2 October 1891 Windsor, Berkshire, England
- Died: 1973 (aged c. 81) London Borough of Brent, Great Britain
- Height: 1.73 m (5 ft 8 in)
- Weight: 60 kg (132 lb)

Sport
- Sport: Athletics
- Event: 10,000 m
- Club: Greenock Glenpark Harriers

Achievements and titles
- Personal best(s): Mile – 4:28.0 (1915); 4 miles – 20:22.4 (1920); 6 miles – 30:45.0 (1920); 10,000 m – 31:50.8 (1920); 10 miles – 52:04.4 (1920)
Medal record
Representing Great Britain
Olympic Games
Silver medal – second place	1920 Antwerp	Cross country team
Bronze medal – third place	1920 Antwerp	10,000 m
International Cross Country Championships
Representing England
Gold medal – first place	1914 Amersham	Team
Representing Scotland
Gold medal – first place	1920 Belfast	Individual
Bronze medal – third place	1920 Belfast	Team
Bronze medal – third place	1924 Newcastle-on-Tyne	Team

James Wilson (2 October 1891 – 1973) was a Scottish long-distance runner who specialised in the 10,000 metres. He competed for Great Britain at the 1920 Summer Olympics and won a bronze medal in the 10,000 metres, five seconds behind Paavo Nurmi; Wilson beat Nurmi by some 5 seconds in the heats. He finished fourth in the individual 8,000 m cross-country race, again behind Nurmi, but won a silver medal with the British team. Nationally, Wilson won Scottish titles over 4 miles in 1914–20 and over 10 miles in 1920.

James and his twin brother John were the youngest of five children of Isabella and Robert Wilson, Scottish migrant workers in England. His father was a herdsman from Aberdeenshire. James and John were inspired to join the local athletics club by watching the 1908 Olympic marathon race that passed near their home. Later, when World War I broke out, John enlisted in the army and died from peritonitis in 1916, while James stayed at home earning his living as a metalworker. After the 1920 Olympics, he found a job as a mechanical engineer at the Neasden Power Station, which provided electricity to the Metropolitan Railways, and semi-retired from running. He resumed competing in 1923, when he joined Surrey Athletic Club, but never regained his past shape and retired for good in 1925.

Wilson was married to Annie Williams. He died from bowel cancer aged 81–82.
