= Julien Van Campenhout =

Belgian long-distance runner

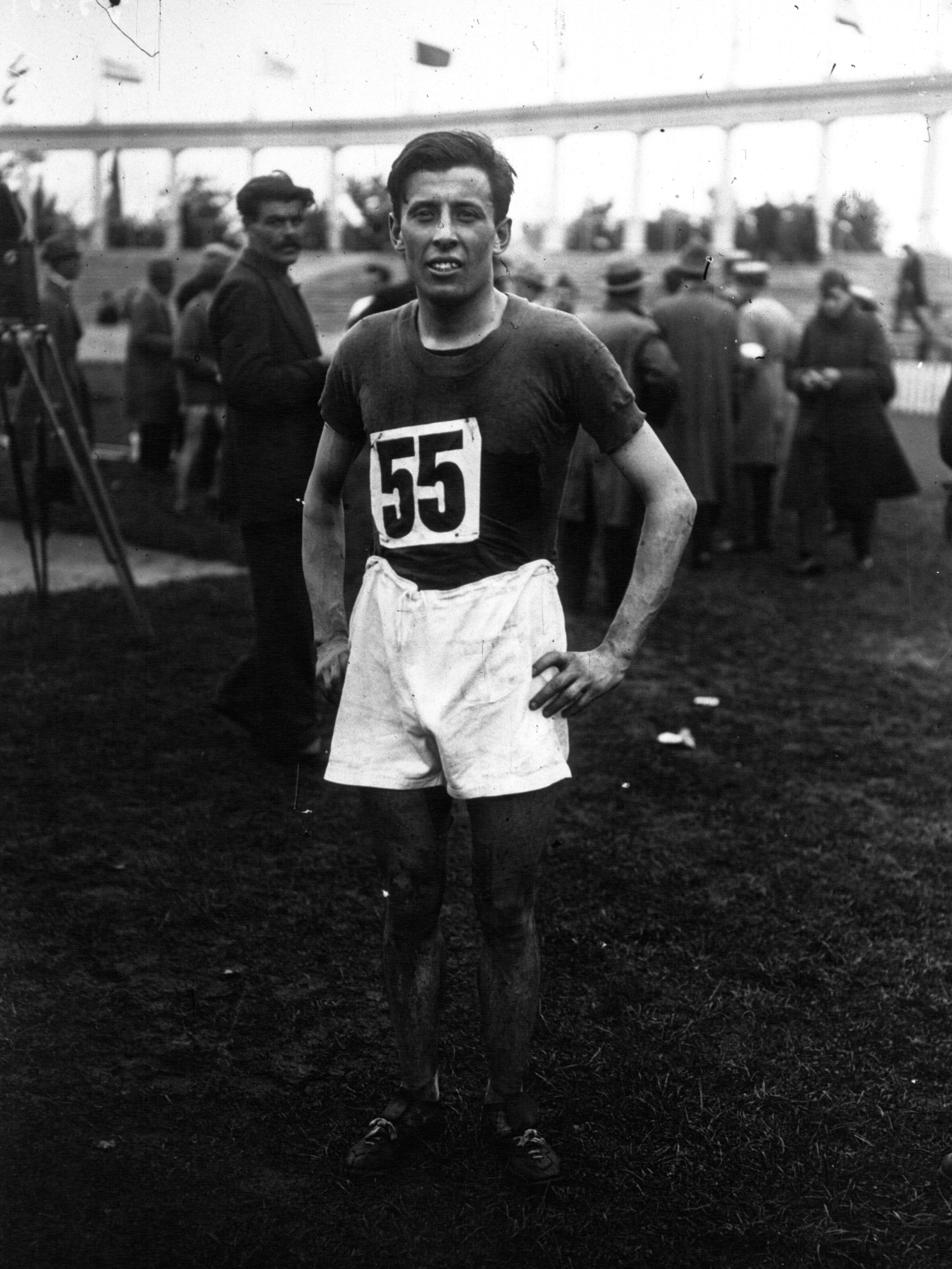

Personal information
- Nationality: Belgian
- Born: 20 February 1898 Anderlecht, Belgium
- Died: 26 August 1933 (aged 35) Uccle, Belgium

Sport
- Sport: Long-distance running
- Event: 5000 metres

Julien Van Campenhout (20 February 1898 – 26 August 1933) was a Belgian long-distance runner. He competed in the men's 5000 metres at the 1920 Summer Olympics.
