= Henri Smets =

Belgian long-distance runner (1896–1950)

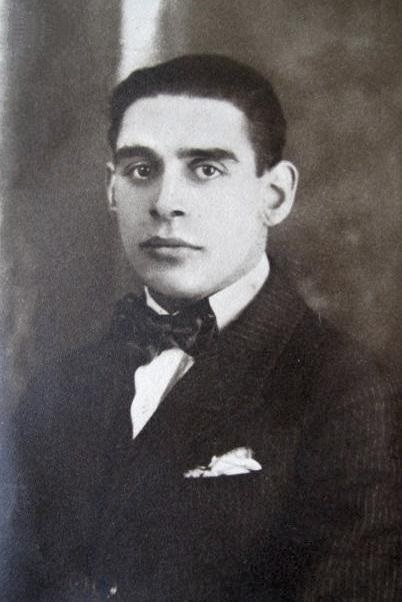
A portrait of Smets

Henri Smets (Wezembeek-Oppem, 23 December 1896 - Brussel, 1994) was a Belgian cross country athlete. He was a participant of the 1920 Olympic Games in Antwerp.

== Performances ==
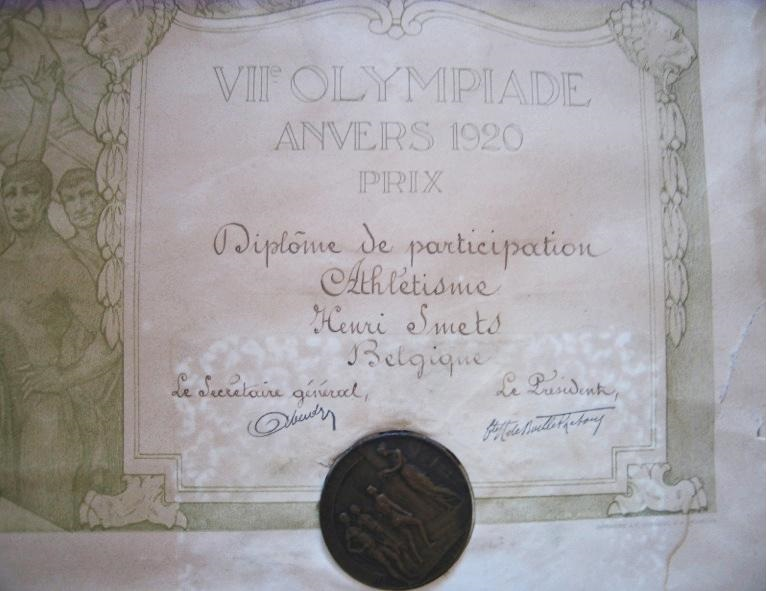

=== Olympic ===
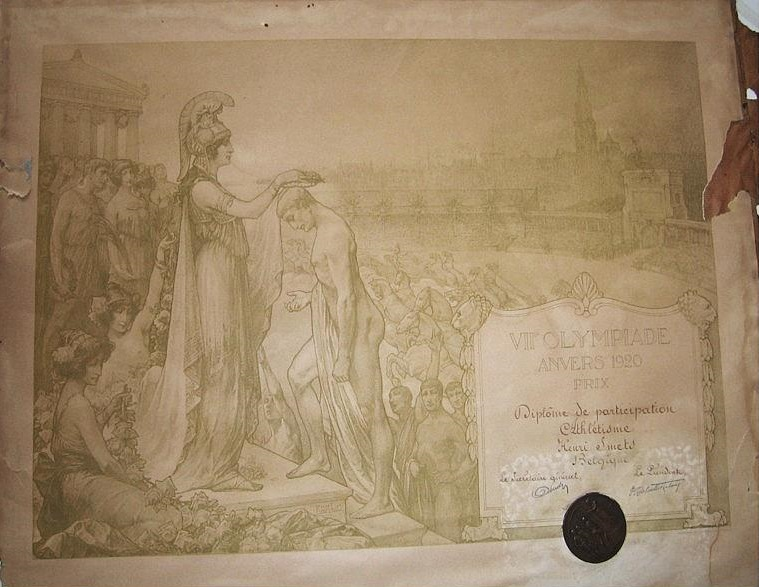

Participant of the de VII° 1920 Summer Olympics Antwerp

Results

- Men 5000 m: 8th in heat 4
- Men individual crosscountry : 33d
- Men team crosscountry: 6th
- Men team 3000 m: 4th in semi-final

=== Belgian Championships ===
1919

Fourth place in Belgian Championship 1500 m

1920

Fourth in Belgian Championship 5000 m

1921

Third place in Belgian Championship 800 m

1922

Fourth place in Belgian Championship 1500 m
