= 1920 United States Olympic trials (track and field) =

American athletics championship event

1920 USA Outdoor Track and Field Championships
- Dates: 17 July; 9–10 July (decathlon, steeplechase)
- Host city: Cambridge, Massachusetts; Travers Island, New York (decathlon, steeplechase)
- Venue: Harvard Stadium (men)
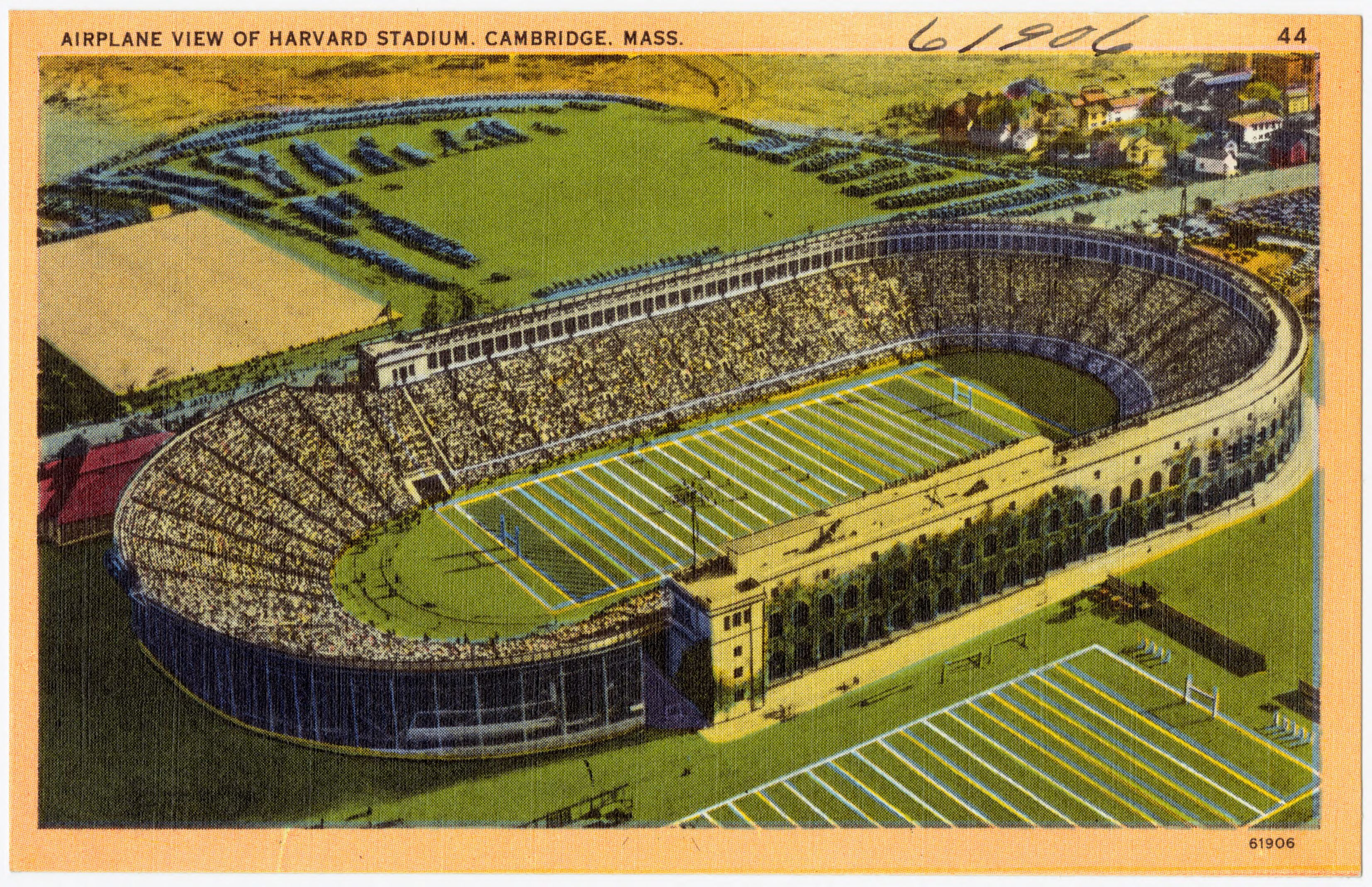

The 1920 United States Olympic trials for track and field were held from 9 to 17 July 1920 and decided the United States team for the 1920 Summer Olympics in Antwerp, Belgium. As women's athletics was not added to the Olympic programme until 1928, only a men's trials was held. Most of the finals took place 16–17 July in Cambridge, Massachusetts at Harvard Stadium, except for the steeplechase and decathlon in Travers Island, New York and the decathlon in New York City.

The meeting also served as the 1920 USA Outdoor Track and Field Championships, unlike future editions which were held separately. It was the first U.S. track and field trials that consisted of only one final per event to make the team, except for the marathon trials which took place over four races.

A maximum of four athletes could be named to the team per event, unlike the three-athlete-limit of future Olympics. Also unlike future Olympic trials, the 1920 trials results were not completely determinative of the team; in several cases athletes who finished outside of the top 4 were selected based on consistency of previous results.

The marathon team was said to have been chosen based on results from marathons in Brooklyn, Detroit, Boston, and New York, although in practice only athletes that ran the Detroit, Boston, or New York marathons were selected. The top Americans at each of these races (Charles Mellor, 2:30:04 for 1st in Detroit; Arthur Roth, 2:30:21 for 2nd in Boston; Joseph Organ, 2:51:06.2 for 2nd in New York) were named to the team, along with Carl Linder who was the 2nd American finisher in Boston (2:23:32 for 3rd overall).

== Results ==
Indicates athlete was selected to event's Olympic team (or metric analogue for imperial distances)

Event	First		Second		Third		Fourth	
100 yards	Loren Murchison	10.0	Jackson Scholz	10.1 e	Charles Paddock	10.2 e	Morris Kirksey	10.2 e
220 yards straight	Charles Paddock	21.4	Morris Kirksey	21.6 e	Loren Murchison	21.6 e	George Massengale (Note: Allen Woodring, who finished 5th in 22.2 estimated, was selected for the 200 m team over Massengale.)	22.0 e
440 yards	Frank Shea	49.0	Ted Meredith	49.4 e	Robert Emery	49.7 e	George Bretnall (Note: George Schiller, who finished 5th in 50.1 estimated, was selected for the 400 m team over Bretnall.)	50.0 e
880 yards	Earl Eby	1:54.2	Donald Scott	1:55.0 e	Thomas Campbell	1:55.3 e	Bryan Sprott	1:55.4 e
1 mile	Joseph Ray	4:16.2	Edward Curtis	4:19.0 e	Lawrence Shields	4:19.2 e	James Connolly	4:20 e
5000 m	Hal Brown	15:26.0	Clifford Furnas	15:29.0 e	John Simmons (Note: Charles Hunter was selected for the 5000 m team instead of Simmons. Hunter started the trials 5000 m but didn't place in the top 6 known finishers.)	15:30.0 e	Ivan Dresser	
10,000 m	Frederick Faller	32:15.0	Earl Johnson	32:18.0 e	George Cornetta		Max Bohland (Note: Amisoli Patasoni, who won the Midwestern qualifiers but did not make the 10,000 m trials final, was selected for the 10,000 m team instead of Bohland.)	
120 yards hurdles	Harold Barron	15.2	William Yount		Walker Smith		Frederick Murray	
440 yards hurdles	Frank Loomis	55.0	John Norton	55.2 e	August Desch		Charles Daggs	
3000 m steeplechase	Patrick Flynn	9:58.2	Michael Devaney	10:06 e	Albert Hulsebosch	10:08 e	Ray Watson	
High jump	John Murphy	1.93 m	Richmond Landon	1.92 m	Harold Muller	1.92 m	Christopher Krogness (Note: Although there was a four-way tie for 4th place, Whalen won a jump-off for the final Olympic spot over Krogness, Erickson, and Corey.)	1.89 m
High jump	John Murphy	1.93 m	Richmond Landon	1.92 m	Harold Muller	1.92 m	Egon Erickson	1.89 m
High jump	John Murphy	1.93 m	Richmond Landon	1.92 m	Harold Muller	1.92 m	Oliver Corey	1.89 m
High jump	John Murphy	1.93 m	Richmond Landon	1.92 m	Harold Muller	1.92 m	Walter Whalen	1.89 m
Pole vault	Frank Foss	3.99 m	Edwin Myers	3.99 m	Edward Knourek	3.91 m	Eldon Jenne	3.91 m
Long jump	Solomon Butler	7.52 m	Sherman Landers (Note: Carl Johnson, who finished 6th with 6.79 m, was selected for the long jump team instead of Landers because Landers chose to focus on the triple jump instead.)	7.14 m	Dink Templeton	6.91 m	Jack Merchant	6.82 m
Triple jump	Sherman Landers	14.83 m	Daniel Ahearn	14.55 m	Kaufman Geist	14.03 m	Clarence Jaquith	13.95 m
Shot put	Patrick McDonald	14.33 m	Harry Liversedge	14.05 m	George Bihlman	13.78 m	Howard Cann	13.56 m
Discus throw	Augustus Pope	44.63 m	William Bartlett	43.22 m	Roy Evans (Note: Only three athletes were selected for the U.S. discus team, and Kenneth L. Wilson, who finished 3rd in the javelin but didn't compete in the trials discus throw, was selected for the discus team over Evans and Husted.)	41.13 m	Merle Husted	41.03 m
Hammer throw	Patrick James Ryan	51.62 m	Matthew McGrath	50.68 m	James McEachern	47.76 m	Basil Bennett	46.74 m
Javelin throw	Milton Angier	58.79 m	James Lincoln	57.07 m	Kenneth Wilson (Note: Instead of Wilson (who competed in the Olympic discus competition instead) and Hanner, Arthur Tuck and Jack Mahan were selected for the U.S. javelin team. Tuck finished 5th at the trials with a 52.39 m throw, while there is no record of Mahan competing at the trials.)	52.56 m	Flint Hanner	52.55 m
Decathlon	Brutus Hamilton	7022.9815 pts	Everett Bradley (Note: Instead of Bradley and LeGendre, Eugene Vidal and Everett Ellis were selected for the U.S. decathlon team. Vidal finished 5th with 6430.9710 points, while Ellis finished 6th with 6217.9685 points.)	6965.1180 pts	Robert LeGendre	6578.7885 pts	Harry Goelitz	6461.5310 pts
3000 m walk	Willie Plant	13:08.0						
Pentathlon	Brutus Hamilton	17 pts						
Weight throw for distance	Patrick McDonald	11.56 m						

== See also ==
- List of USA Outdoor Track and Field Championships winners (men)
- List of USA Outdoor Track and Field Championships winners (women)
