= Athletics at the 1920 Summer Olympics – Men's marathon =

Men's marathon at the Games of the VII Olympiad
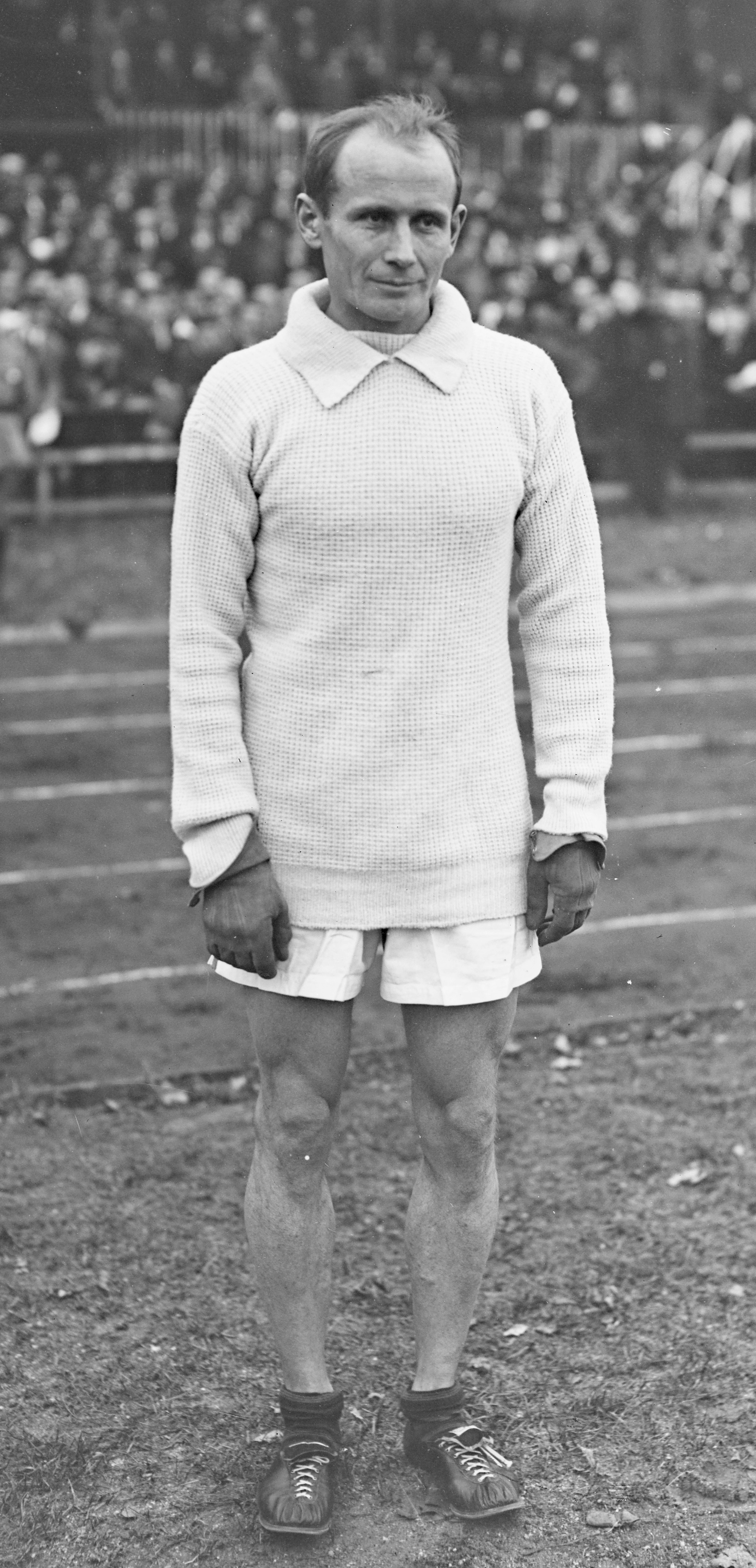
- Hannes Kolehmainen
- Venue: Olympisch Stadion, Antwerp
- Dates: 22 August 1920
- Competitors: 48 from 17 nations
- Winning time: 2:32:35.8 WR

Medalists
1st place, gold medalist(s)		Hannes Kolehmainen; Finland
2nd place, silver medalist(s)		Jüri Lossmann; Estonia
3rd place, bronze medalist(s)		Valerio Arri; Italy

The men's marathon event was part of the track and field athletics programme at the 1920 Summer Olympics. The distance of this race was 42.75 kilometres. The competition was held on Sunday, 22 August 1920. 48 runners from 17 nations competed. No nation had more than 4 runners, suggesting the limit had been reduced from the 12 maximum in force in 1908 and 1912. The event was won by Hannes Kolehmainen of Finland, the nation's first Olympic marathon medal and victory; Kolehmainen received his fourth gold medal, having won the 5000 metres, 10,000 metres, and individual cross country in 1912. Estonia (Jüri Lossmann's silver) and Italy (Valerio Arri's bronze) also won their first marathon medals.

== Background ==
This was the sixth appearance of the event, which is one of 12 athletics events to have been held at every Summer Olympics. The field included significant competitors, including the original Flying Finn, Hannes Kolehmainen (who had not run the marathon in 1912, but took gold in three other distance events) and his brother Tatu Kolehmainen (who had competed in the 1912 marathon); South Africa's Christian Gitsham (silver medal in the 1912 marathon); and American Boston Marathon winners Arthur Roth (1916) and Carl Linder (1919), as well as future winner Charles Mellor (1925). Shizo Kanakuri of Japan, still considered a missing person in Sweden after disappearing during the 1912 Olympic marathon, competed.

Chile, Estonia, and India each made their first appearance in Olympic marathons. The United States made its sixth appearance, the only nation to have competed in each Olympic marathon to that point.

== Competition format ==
As all marathons, the competition was a single race. The course for the race was listed as 42.75 kilometres long, making it the longest Olympic marathon ever. However, the Association of Road Racing Statisticians estimated the course to be only 40 km, which would make it among the shorter courses in the pre-standardized era. The course included 1.5 laps of the stadium at both the start and finish.

== Records ==
These were the standing world and Olympic records (in hours) prior to the 1920 Summer Olympics.

World record	Alexis Ahlgren (SWE)	2:36:07	London, United Kingdom	31 May 1913
Olympic record	Ken McArthur (RSA)	2:36:54.8(*)	Stockholm, Sweden	14 July 1912

(*) Distance was 40.2 kilometres

Hannes Kolehmainen is recognized as having set a new world best with a time of 2:32:35.8 hours.

== Schedule ==
The weather during the race has been described as "cool". An Associated Press report described the weather as "cold and showery", but "fine running weather for the marathoners".

Date	Time	Round
Sunday, 22 August 1920	16:12	Final

== Results ==
Rank	Athlete	Nation	Time	Notes
1st place, gold medalist(s)	Hannes Kolehmainen	Finland	2:32:35.8	WR, OR
2nd place, silver medalist(s)	Jüri Lossmann	Estonia	2:32:48.6	
3rd place, bronze medalist(s)	Valerio Arri	Italy	2:36:32.8	
4	Auguste Broos	Belgium	2:39:25.8	
5	Juho Tuomikoski	Finland	2:40:18.8	
6	Sofus Rose	Denmark	2:41:18.0	
7	Joseph Organ	United States	2:41:30.0	
8	Rudolf Hansen	Denmark	2:41:39.4	
9	Urho Tallgren	Finland	2:42:40.0	
10	Tatu Kolehmainen	Finland	2:44:02.3	
11	Carl Linder	United States	2:44:21.2	
12	Charles Mellor	United States	2:45:30.0	
13	James Dellow	Canada	2:46:47.0	
14	Bobby Mills	Great Britain	2:48:05.0	
15	Arthur Scholes	Canada	2:48:30.0	
16	Shizo Kanakuri	Japan	2:48:45.4	
17	Gustav Kinn	Sweden	2:49:10.4	
18	Albert Moché	France	2:50:00.2	
19	Phadeppa Chaugle	India	2:50:45.4	
20	Zensaku Motegi	Japan	2:51:09.4	
21	Kenzo Yashima	Japan	2:57:02.0	
22	Norman General	Canada	2:58:01.0	
23	Rudolf Wåhlin	Sweden	2:59:23.0	
24	Yahei Miura	Japan	2:59:37.0	
25	Henri Teyssedou	France	3:00:04.0	
26	Hendricus Wessel	Netherlands	3:00:17.0	
27	Charles Melis	Belgium	3:00:51.0	
28	William Grüner	Sweden	3:01:48.0	
29	George Piper	Great Britain	3:02:10.0	
30	Sinton Hewitt	Australia	3:03:27.0	
31	Leslie Housden	Great Britain	3:14:25.0	
32	Iraklis Sakellaropoulos	Greece	3:14:25.0	
33	Juan Bascuñán	Chile	3:17:47.0	
34	Oscar Blansaer	Belgium	3:20:00.0	
35	Eric Robertson	Great Britain	3:55:00.0	
—	Ettore Blasi	Italy	DNF	
—	Louis Ichard	France	DNF	
—	Antonio Persico	Italy	DNF	
—	Albert Smoke	Canada	DNF	
—	Axel Jensen	Denmark	DNF	
—	Panagiotis Trivoulidas	Greece	DNF	
—	Christiaan Huijgens	Netherlands	DNF	
—	Desiré Van Remortel	Belgium	DNF	
—	Hans Schuster	Sweden	DNF	
—	Amédée Trichard	France	DNF	
—	Sadashiv Datar	India	DNF	
—	Christian Gitsham	South Africa	DNF	
—	Arthur Roth	United States	DNF	
