= Athletics at the 1920 Summer Olympics – Men's 10,000 metres =

Men's 10,000 metres at the Games of the VII Olympiad
- Venue: Olympisch Stadion
- Dates: August 19–20, 1920
- Competitors: 34 from 17 nations

Medalists
| 1st place, gold medalist(s) | | Paavo Nurmi | Finland |
| 2nd place, silver medalist(s) | | Joseph Guillemot | France |
| 3rd place, bronze medalist(s) | | James Wilson | Great Britain |

The men's 10,000 metres event was part of the track and field athletics programme at the 1920 Summer Olympics. The competition was held on Thursday, August 19, 1920, and on Friday, August 20, 1920. Thirty-four runners from 17 nations competed.

== Records ==
These were the standing world and Olympic records (in minutes) prior to the 1920 Summer Olympics.

| World record | 30:58.8 | (France) Jean Bouin | Colombes (FRA) | November 16, 1911 |
| Olympic record | 31:20.8 | Hannes Kolehmainen | Stockholm (SWE) | July 8, 1912 |

== Results ==
=== Semifinals ===
All semi-finals were held on Thursday, August 19, 1920.

==== Semifinal 1 ====
| Place | Athlete | Time | Qual. |
|---|---|---|---|
| 1 | James Wilson (GBR) | 33:40.2 | Q |
| 2 | Paavo Nurmi (FIN) | 33:46.3 | Q |
| 3 | Augusto Maccario (ITA) | 34:06.8 | Q |
| 4 | Jean-Baptiste Manhès (FRA) | 34:12.0 | Q |
| 5 | Alfred Gaschen (SUI) | 34:38.4 | Q |
| 6 | Verner Magnusson (SWE) | 34:49.2 | |
| 7 | Lucien Duquesne (FRA) | 35:06.6 | |
| 8 | Pierre Devaux (BEL) | 36:38.3 | |
| — | Jüri Lossman (EST) | DNF | |
| — | Phadeppa Chaugle (IND) | DNF | |
| — | Julius Ebert (DEN) | DNF | |
| — | Amisoli Patasoni (USA) | DNF | |

==== Semifinal 2 ====
| Place | Athlete | Time | Qual. |
|---|---|---|---|
| 1 | Joseph Guillemot (FRA) | 32:41.6 | Q |
| 2 | Eric Backman (SWE) | 32:48.5 | Q |
| 3 | Albert Andersen (DEN) | 32:58.4 | Q |
| 4 | Fred Faller (USA) | 33:02.4 | Q |
| 5 | Oscar Garin (SUI) | 33:04.4 | Q |
| 6 | Edward Lawrence (CAN) | 33:08.5 | |
| 7 | Teodoro Pons (ESP) | | |
| 8 | Konosuke Sano (JPN) | | |
| 9 | Aimé Proot (BEL) | | |
| 10 | Sinton Hewitt (AUS) | | |

==== Semifinal 3 ====
| Place | Athlete | Time | Qual. |
|---|---|---|---|
| 1 | Heikki Liimatainen (FIN) | 32:08.2 | Q |
| 2 | Charles Clibbon (GBR) | 32:08.8 | Q |
| 3 | Gaston Heuet (FRA) | 32:11.1 | Q |
| 4 | Carlo Speroni (ITA) | 32:13.1 | Q |
| 5 | James Hatton (GBR) | 32:23.0 | Q |
| 6 | Nils Bergström (SWE) | 33:38.0 | |
| 7 | Alexandros Kranis (GRE) | | |
| 8 | Earl Johnson (USA) | | |
| 9 | George Cornetta (USA) | | |
| 10 | Constantino Lussana (ITA) | | |
| 11 | Karel Pacák (TCH) | | |
| 12 | Zensaku Motegi (JPN) | | |

=== Final ===
The final was held on Friday, August 20, 1920.

| Place | Athlete | Time |
|---|---|---|
| 1 | Paavo Nurmi (FIN) | 31:45.8 |
| 2 | Joseph Guillemot (FRA) | 31:47.2 |
| 3 | James Wilson (GBR) | 31:50.8 |
| 4 | Augusto Maccario (ITA) | 32:02.0 |
| 5 | James Hatton (GBR) | 32:14.0 |
| 6 | Jean-Baptiste Manhès (FRA) | 32:26.0 |
| 7 | Heikki Liimatainen (FIN) | 32:28.0 |
| 8 | Fred Faller (USA) | 32:38.0 |
| 9 | Oscar Garin (SUI) | |
| — | Charles Clibbon (GBR) | DNF |
| — | Alfred Gaschen (SUI) | DNF |
| — | Eric Backman (SWE) | DNF |
| — | Albert Andersen (DEN) | DNF |
| — | Carlo Speroni (ITA) | DNF |
| — | Gaston Heuet (FRA) | DNF |

== Sources ==
- Belgian Olympic Committee (1957). Olympic Games Antwerp 1920: Official Report (in French).
- Wudarski, Pawel (1999). "Wyniki Igrzysk Olimpijskich" (in Polish).
