= Dellow (surname) =

Dellow is a surname. Notable people with the surname include:

- Carl-Magnus Dellow (born 1951), Swedish actor
- David Dellow (born 1979), Australian triathlete
- James Dellow (1887–1970), Canadian long-distance runner
- John Dellow (born 1931), British police officer
- Ron Dellow (1914–2013), English footballer and manager
