= Henrie Adams =

Dutch conductor (1954–2022)

- Born: 17 May 1954; Thorn, Netherlands
- Died: 26 November 2022 (aged 68)
- Occupation: Conductor

Henrie Adams (17 May 1954 – 26 November 2022) was a Dutch conductor. He focused on band music, and was from 1989 to 2019 director of the Spanish Banda Sinfónica de la Sociedad Musical "La Artística" in Buñol, leading them to achieve prizes at international competitions. He conducted them in many recordings. Adams led world premieres of works for symphonic bands, such as Johan de Meij's Symphony No. 3 "Planet Earth", a choral symphony, in 2007. From 2008, he also directed the Orquesta Sinfónica de Castelló in Castellón de la Plana.

== Biography ==
Adams played the oboe from the age of eight. From 1969 he was an oboist with the Orchestra St. Michaël Thorn, a concert band, under the conductors Heinz Friesen and Walter Boeykens. After completing his pedagogical academy in Echt, he attended the Maastricht Academy of Music in 1979 and studied oboe and orchestral conducting with Anton Kersjes, Lucas Vis and Pierre Kuijpers. He also had special courses from Pierre Devaux and Enrique García Asensio.

He became conductor of the orchestra Sinfonietta Geleen and orchestra "L'Union", in Heythuysen, the Kerkelijke Harmonie "St. Joseph" Weert (1987–1989) and the (Royal) orchestra "Eendracht" (Meijel). He was also second conductor of Orchestra St. Michaël Thorn and active as a guest conductor with the Limburgs Symfonie Orkest (LSO) in Maastricht, the Royal Military Band "Johan Willem Friso" in The Hague, the Royal Band of the Belgian Guides in Brussels, the symphony orchestra of the Maastricht Academy of Music, Orquesta Sinfónica de Bilbao, Banda Sinfónica Municipal de Madrid, and Orquesta Sinfónica de Valencia.

In 1989 he was hired as chief conductor of the Banda Sinfónica de la Sociedad Musical "La Artística" in Buñol (Spain). He also taught at the local music school. With the band, he became world champion in the Concert Department at the 14th Wereld Muziek Concours (WMC) in Kerkrade in 2001. Under his direction, this orchestra was several times winner of the first prize in the Sección de Honor (the highest division) at the City of Valencia International Band Contest. He conducted the band until 2019.

From 1992 to 1999 he was also conductor of Orquesta Sinfónica Joven de Provincia Valencia. From 2008, he also directed the Orquesta Sinfónica de Castelló in Castellón de la Plana.

Adams recorded numbers of CDs and DVDs with the Banda Sinfónica de la Sociedad Musical "La Artística". In May 2022, he conducted Royal Military Band Johan Willem Friso on the occasion of the 50th anniversary of the Adams Music Centre in Ittervoort; they played the premiere of Nitescence Crépusculaire by Alexandre Kosmicki. He conducted world premieres of works for band, such as Teo Aparicio-Barberán's States of Mind, his second symphony for band, and Johan de Meij's Symphony No. 3 "Planet Earth", a choral symphony with women's choir, both 2007, and Marc van Delft's Celebration Symphony, Op. 140, in 2008. Thomas Trachsel dedicated his Symphonie No. 2 "von der Angst unserer Zeit" to Adams, who conducted the international premiere in April 2009.

After being ill for some time, Adams died on 26 November 2022, at the age of 68.
