= Tallgren =

Tallgren is a surname. Notable people with the surname include:

- Aarne Michaël Tallgren (1885–1945), Finnish archaeologist
- Carl Olof Tallgren (1927–2024), Finnish politician
- Urho Tallgren (1894–1959), Finnish long-distance runner
