= Motegi =

Motegi may refer to

- Motegi, Tochigi, a town in Japan
  - Motegi Circuit, a motorsport race track located at Motegi
  - Motegi Station, a railway station in Motegi
- Motegi (surname)
