= Axel Jensen (disambiguation) =

Axel Jensen (1932–2003) was a Norwegian author.

Axel Jensen may also refer to:

- Axel Jensen, Jr. (born 1960), son of author Axel Jensen and subject of the 2020 film Little Axel
- Axel Jensen (athlete) (1899–1968), Danish long-distance runner
- Axel P. Jensen (1885–1972), Danish painter

== See also ==
- Thor Philip Axel Jensen, Danish entrepreneur
