= George Piper =

George Piper may refer to:

- George Piper (athlete)
- George Piper (footballer)
- George Piper (rugby league)
