= Wahlin =

Wahlin or Wåhlin is a Swedish surname that may refer to

- Anna Wåhlin (born 1970), Swedish polar researcher
- Jennie Wåhlin (born 1997), Swedish curler
- Kristian Wåhlin (born 1971), Swedish musician and graphic designer
- Lotta Wahlin (born 1983), Swedish golfer
- Rudolf Wåhlin (1887–1972), Swedish long-distance runner
- Sten Wåhlin (1914–1981), Swedish Army lieutenant general
