= Maccario =

Maccario is an Italian surname. Notable people with the surname include:

- Augusto Maccario (1890–1927), Italian long-distance runner
- Maguy Maccario Doyle (fl. 1976), Monegasque diplomat
