= Louis Ichard =

French long-distance runner

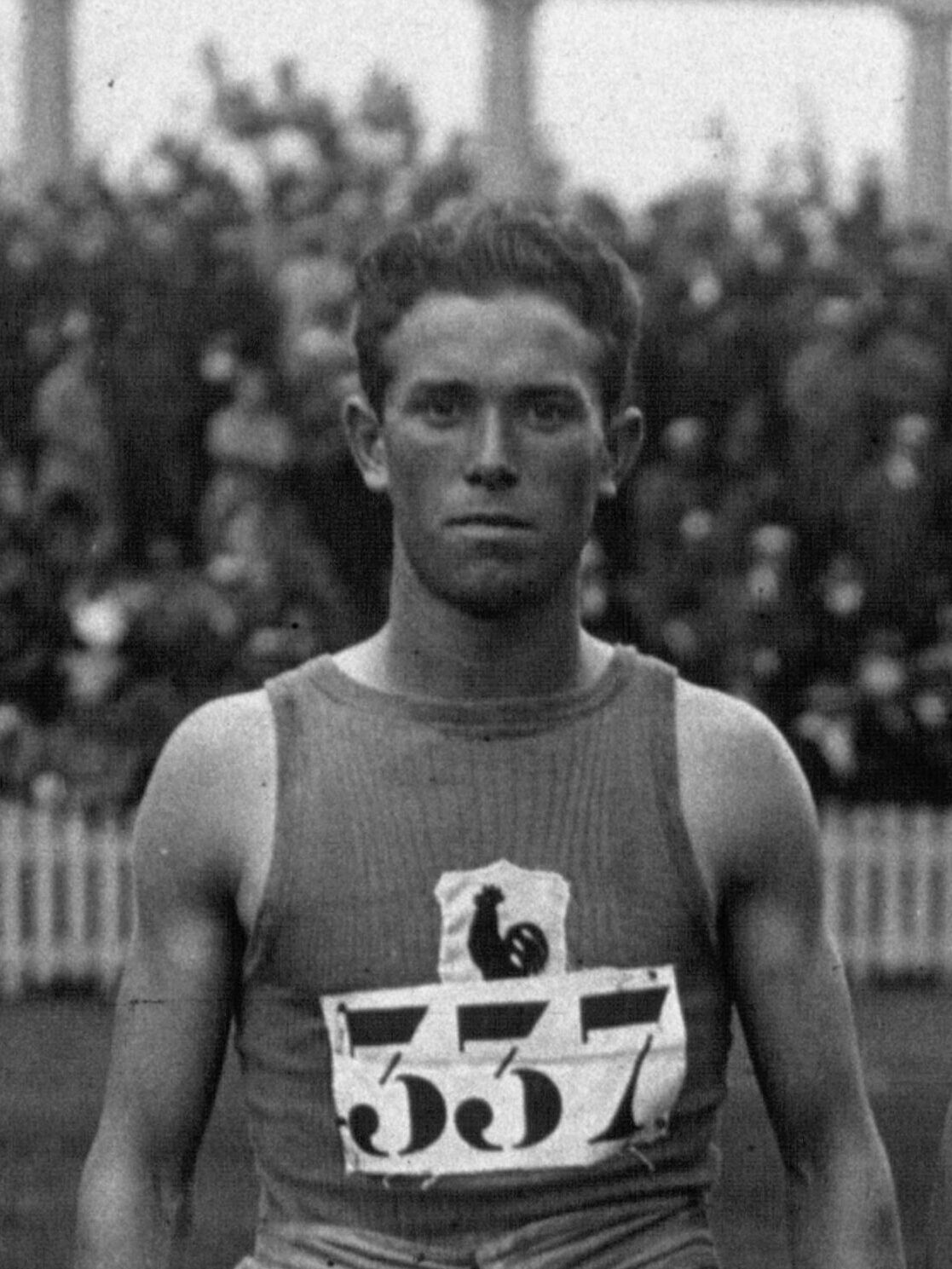

Personal information
- Nationality: French
- Born: 2 January 1901 Sète, France
- Died: 29 November 1986 (aged 85) Sète, France
- Height: 169 cm (5 ft 7 in)
- Weight: 57 kg (126 lb)

Sport
- Sport: Long-distance running
- Event: Marathon

Louis Ichard (2 January 1901 – 29 November 1986) was a French long-distance runner. He competed in the marathon at the 1920 Summer Olympics.
