= Oscar Garin =

Swiss long-distance runner

Personal information
- Nationality: Swiss
- Born: 17 September 1900 Geneva, Switzerland
- Died: 30 August 1977 (aged 76) Fiez, Switzerland

Sport
- Sport: Long-distance running
- Event: 10,000 metres

Oscar Garin (born 17 September 1900, date of death unknown) was a Swiss long-distance runner. He competed in the men's 10,000 metres at the 1920 Summer Olympics.
