= Hans Schuster =

Swedish long-distance runner

Personal information
- Nationality: Swedish
- Born: 7 December 1888 Östersund, Sweden
- Died: 10 June 1970 (aged 81) Stockholm, Sweden

Sport
- Sport: Long-distance running
- Event: Marathon

Hans Schuster (7 December 1888 – 10 June 1970) was a Swedish long-distance runner. He competed in the marathon at the 1920 Summer Olympics.
