= Antonio Persico =

Italian long-distance runner

Personal information
- Full name: Antonio Augusto Persico
- Nationality: Italian
- Born: 29 December 1895
- Died: 31 March 1967 (aged 71)

Sport
- Country: Italy
- Sport: Athletics
- Event: Marathon
- Club: SS Mazzini Roma

Achievements and titles
- Personal best: Marathon: 2:44:36 (1920)

Antonio Augusto Persico (29 December 1895 – 31 March 1967) was an Italian long-distance runner. He competed in the marathon at the 1920 Summer Olympics but did not finish the race. His personal best in marathon race is 2:44:36 established in 1920. His athletic club was SS Mazzini Roma.

== See also ==
- Italy at the 1920 Summer Olympics
