= Christiaan Huijgens =

Dutch long-distance runner

Personal information
- Nationality: Dutch
- Born: 25 January 1897 Utrecht, Netherlands
- Died: 11 January 1963 (aged 65) Utrecht, Netherlands

Sport
- Sport: Long-distance running
- Event: Marathon

Christiaan Huijgens (25 January 1897 – 11 January 1963) was a Dutch long-distance runner. He competed in the marathon at the 1920 Summer Olympics.
