= Motegi (surname) =

Motegi (written: 茂木) is a Japanese surname. Notable people with the surname include:

- Masaru Motegi (茂木 優, born 1950), Japanese sport wrestler
- Masayoshi Motegi (茂木 正淑, born 1962), Japanese professional wrestler
- Rikiya Motegi (茂木 力也, born 1996), Japanese footballer
- Shunsuke Motegi (茂木 駿佑, born 1996), Japanese footballer
- Toshimitsu Motegi (茂木 敏充, born 1955), Japanese politician
- Zensaku Motegi (茂木 善作, 1893–1974), Japanese long-distance runner
