= Albert Andersen =

Danish long-distance runner

Personal information
- Full name: Peter Johan Albert Antomius Andersen
- Nationality: Danish
- Born: 17 February 1891 Rudkøbing, Langeland, Denmark
- Died: 7 December 1977 (aged 86) Frederiksberg, Denmark

Sport
- Sport: Long-distance running
- Event: 10,000 metres

Peter Johan Albert Antomius Andersen (17 February 1891 – 7 December 1977) was a Danish long-distance runner. He competed in the men's 10,000 metres at the 1920 Summer Olympics.
