= Sofus Rose =

Danish long-distance runner

Personal information
- Nationality: Danish
- Born: 10 April 1894 Kongens Lyngby, Denmark
- Died: 15 September 1974 (aged 80) Copenhagen, Denmark

Sport
- Sport: Long-distance running
- Event: Marathon

Sofus Rose (10 April 1894 – 15 September 1974) was a Danish long-distance runner. He competed in the marathon at the 1920 Summer Olympics.
