= Verner Magnusson =

Swedish long-distance runner

Personal information
- Full name: John Verner Magnusson
- Nationality: Swedish
- Born: 10 October 1890 Gothenburg, Sweden
- Died: 13 March 1966 (aged 75) Härlanda, Gothenburg, Sweden

Sport
- Sport: Long-distance running
- Event: 10,000 metres

John Verner Magnusson (10 October 1890 – 13 March 1966) was a Swedish long-distance runner. He competed in the men's 10,000 metres at the 1920 Summer Olympics.
