= Julius Ebert =

Danish long-distance runner

Personal information
- Full name: Julius Sophus Emil Ebert
- Nationality: Danish
- Born: 2 December 1898 Copenhagen, Denmark
- Died: 2 March 1993 (aged 94) Copenhagen, Denmark

Sport
- Sport: Long-distance running
- Event: 10,000 metres

Julius Sophus Emil Ebert (2 December 1898 – 2 March 1993) was a Danish long-distance runner. He competed in the men's 10,000 metres at the 1920 Summer Olympics.
