= Leslie Housden =

English athlete and child welfare specialist

Personal information
- Nationality: British
- Born: 30 October 1894 Bromley, Kent, England
- Died: 19 December 1963 (aged 69) Basingstoke, England

Sport
- Sport: Long-distance running
- Event: Marathon

Dr. Leslie George Housden OBE (30 October 1894 – 19 December 1963) was an English medical doctor who specialised in child welfare, he also represented the United Kingdom in the Men's marathon at the 1920 Summer Olympics, held in Antwerp.

== Early life ==
Housden was born in 1894 in Bromley, Kent, and was educated at The King's School, Canterbury from 1908 to 1911. He qualified as a doctor at Guy's Hospital. At the 1920 Summer Olympics Housden came 31st in the Men's marathon at a time of 3'14:25.0, 40 minutes behind the winner.

== Medical ==
Housden was an honorary medical advisor to the Save the Children Fund and, from 1948 to 1955, an advisor to the Ministry of Health on parentcraft. In 1944 he was appointed an Officer of the Order of the British Empire for services to child welfare.

== Family ==
Housden had married Esther Boyt in 1926, and they had four children; a daughter, Biddy, died aged 16 on 9 August 1944.

== Books ==
- The Breast-Fed Baby in General Practice - 1932
- The Art of Mothercraft - 1939
- Healthy, happy children - 1944
- Home-Life and Community
- Handbook of Parentcraft - 1948
- The Prevention of Cruelty to Children - 1955
