= Amédée Trichard =

French long-distance runner

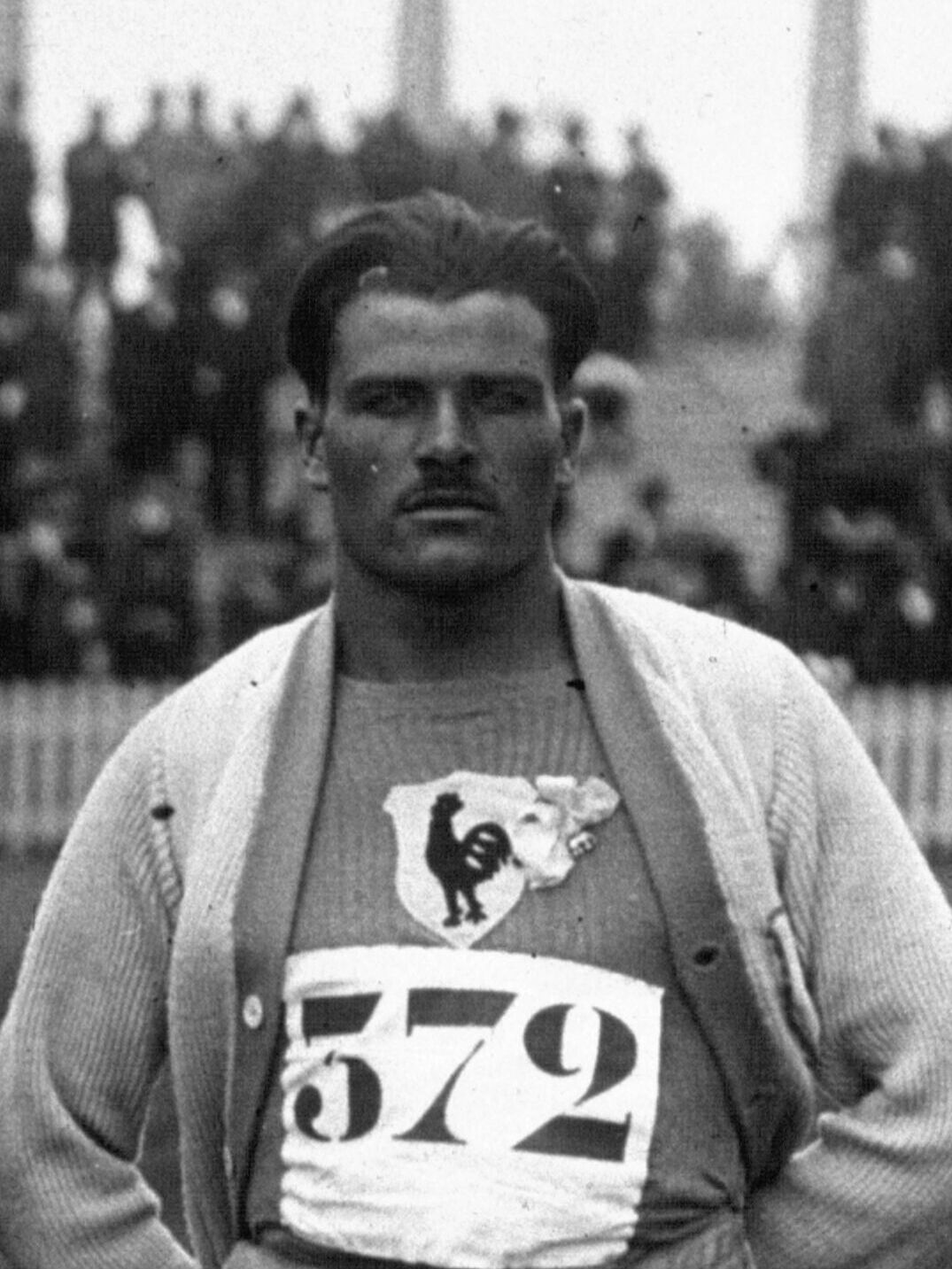

Personal information
- Nationality: French
- Born: 8 April 1899 Sigogne, France
- Died: 1950 (aged 50–51)
- Height: 163 cm (5 ft 4 in)

Sport
- Sport: Long-distance running
- Event: Marathon

Amédée Trichard (8 April 1899 – 1950) was a French long-distance runner. He competed in the marathon at the 1920 Summer Olympics.
