= Charles Melis =

Belgian long-distance runner (1893–1982)

Personal information
- Full name: Petrus Carolus Melis
- Nationality: Belgian
- Born: 29 August 1893 Lier, Belgium
- Died: 10 January 1982 (aged 88) Berchem, Belgium

Sport
- Sport: Long-distance running
- Event: Marathon

Charles Melis (29 August 1893 – 10 January 1982) was a Belgian long-distance runner. He competed in the marathon at the 1920 Summer Olympics.
