= Florin Floyd =

American pole vaulter

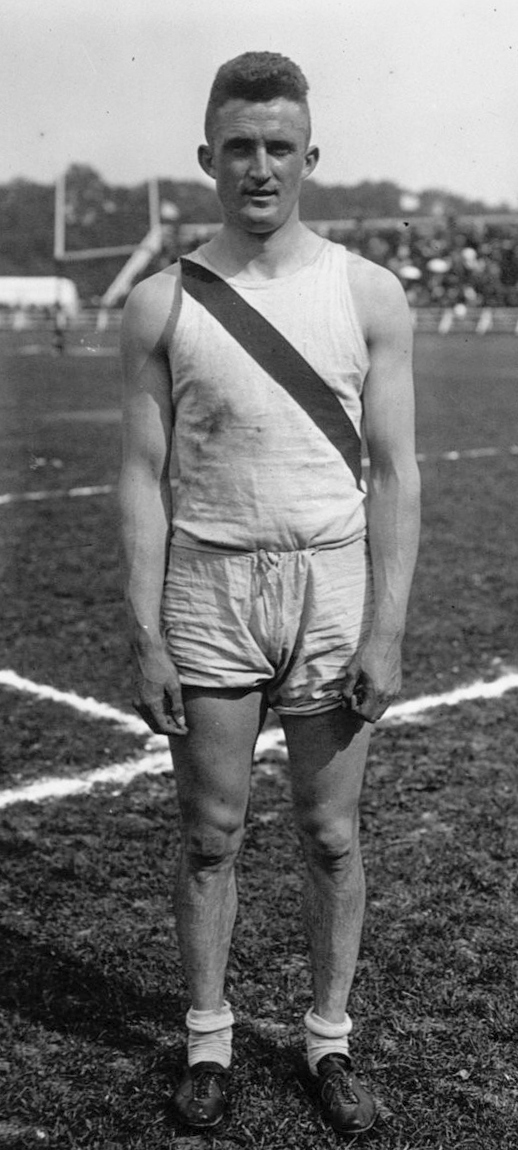
- Floyd in 1919

Personal information
- Born: 24 November 1894 Missouri
- Died: September 1981 (aged 86) Potosi, Missouri

Sport
- Sport: Athletics
- Event: Pole vault

Achievements and titles
- Personal best: 3.87 m (1916)

Florin W. Floyd (24 November 1894 – September 1981) was an American pole vaulter. On 27 February 1916 he set a world indoor record at 3.87 m. He cleared 3.81 m outdoors at the U.S. Championships later that year, which was only enough for a bronze medal. In 1919, Floyd won the pole vault at the Inter-Allied Games.
