= Desiré Van Remortel =

Belgian long-distance runner

Personal information
- Nationality: Belgian
- Born: 10 November 1892
- Died: Unknown

Sport
- Sport: Long-distance running
- Event: Marathon

Desiré Van Remortel (born 10 November 1892, date of death unknown) was a Belgian long-distance runner. He competed in the marathon at the 1920 Summer Olympics.
