= Albert Moché =

French long-distance runner

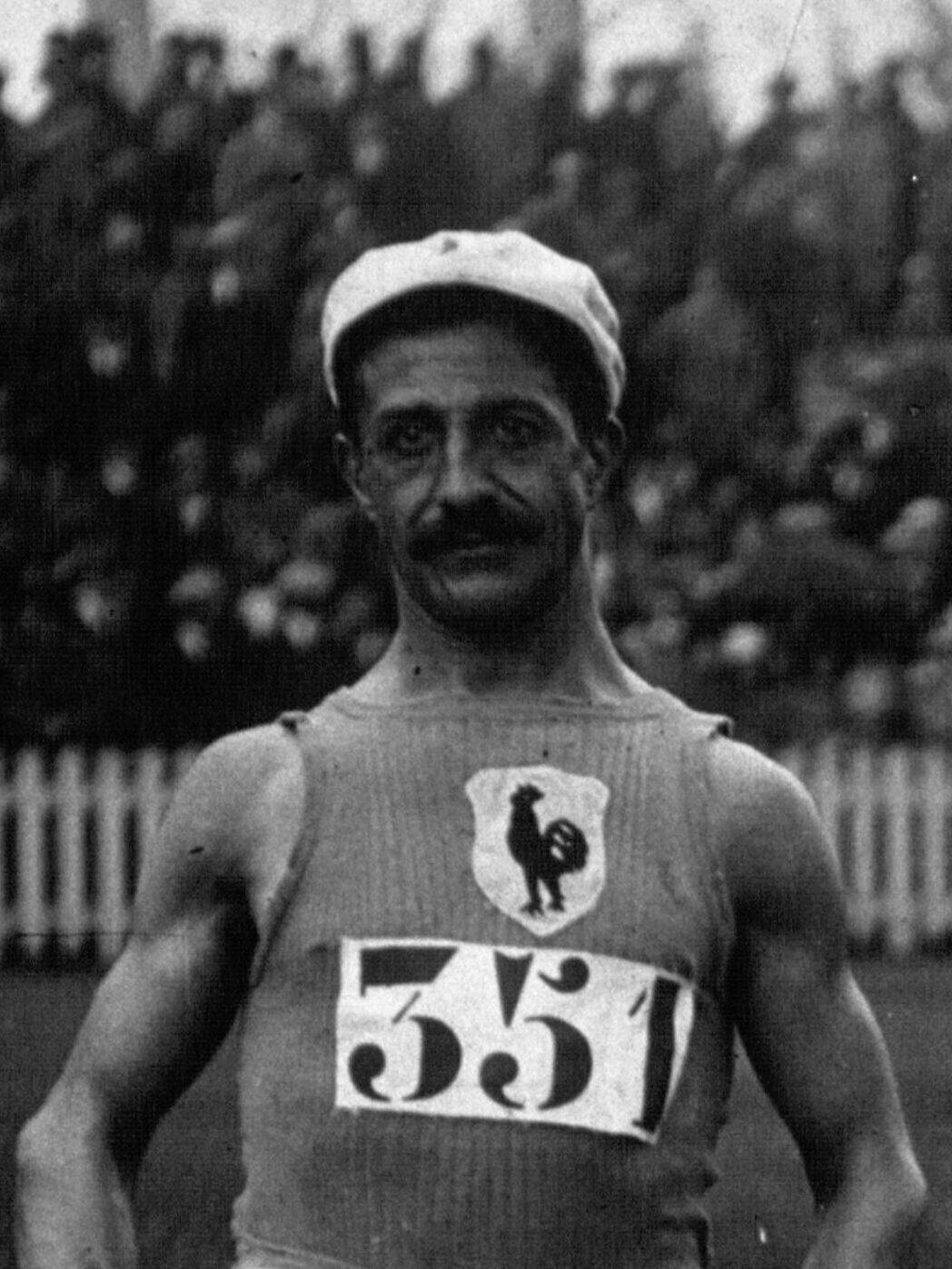

Personal information
- Nationality: French
- Born: 11 February 1885 Paris, France
- Died: 6 February 1977 (aged 91) Paris, France
- Height: 165 cm (5 ft 5 in)
- Weight: 62 kg (137 lb)

Sport
- Sport: Long-distance running
- Event: Marathon

Albert Moché (11 February 1885 – 6 February 1977) was a French long-distance runner. He competed in the marathon at the 1920 Summer Olympics.
