= Juho Tuomikoski =

Finnish long-distance runner

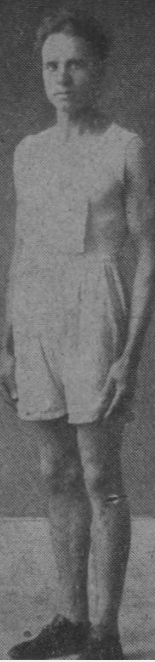

Personal information
- Nationality: Finnish
- Born: 14 December 1888 Ilmajoki, Finland
- Died: 20 June 1973 (aged 84) Palm Beach Florida

Sport
- Sport: Long-distance running
- Event: Marathon

Juho Tuomikoski (14 December 1888 – 20 June 1973) was a Finnish long-distance runner. He competed in the marathon at the 1920 Summer Olympics. Tuomikoski died in the United States where he had moved.
