= Kenzo Yashima =

Japanese long-distance runner

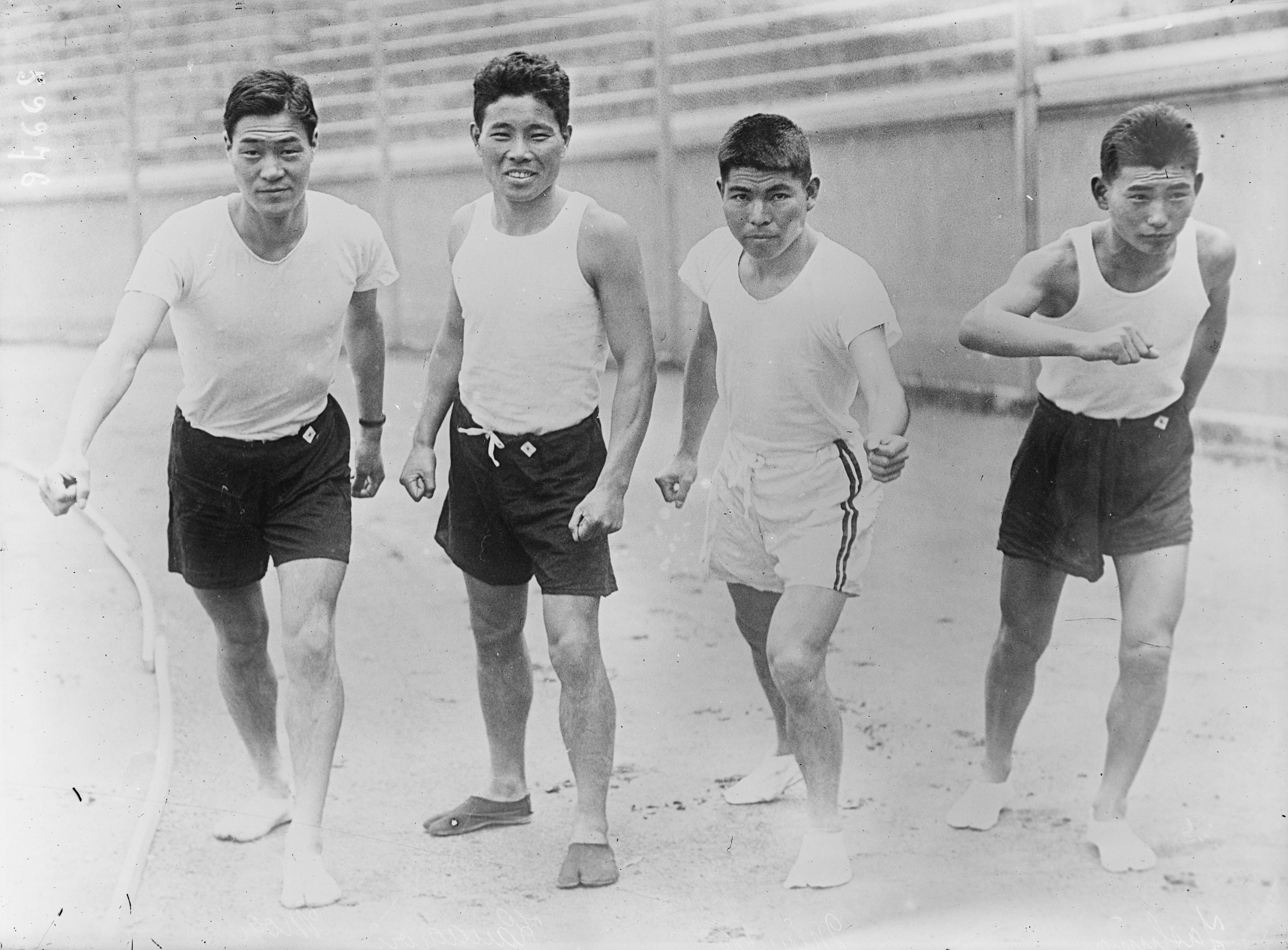

Personal information
- Nationality: Japanese
- Born: 6 April 1902
- Died: 17 October 1979 (aged 77)

Sport
- Sport: Long-distance running
- Event: Marathon

Kenzo Yashima (八島健三, Yashima Kenzō; 6 April 1902 – 17 October 1979) was a Japanese long-distance runner. He competed in the marathon at the 1920 Summer Olympics.
