= Athletics at the Inter-Allied Games =

Inter-Allied Games
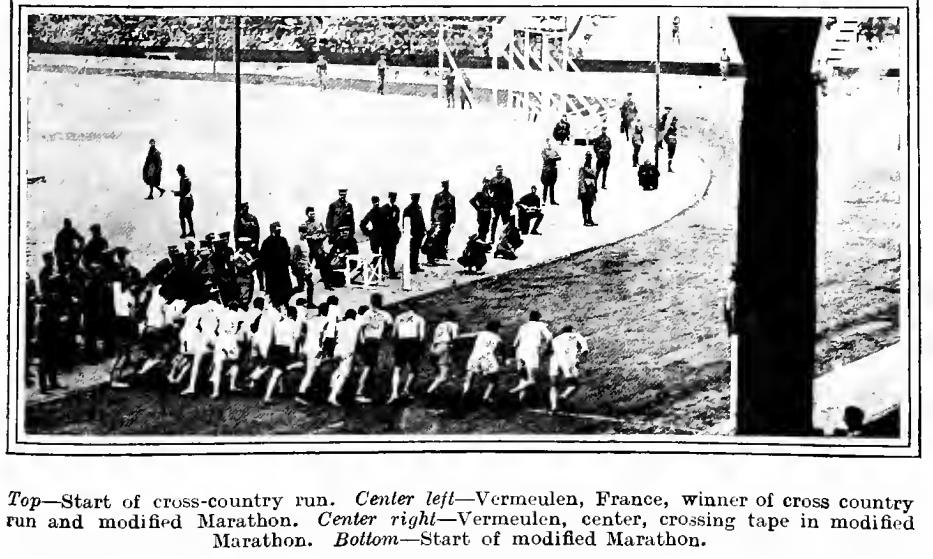
- The start of the Modified Marathon race (16,000 metres) at the Stade Pershing
- Dates: June 22 to July 6, 1919
- Host city: Paris, France
- Venue: Stade Pershing
- Events: 24 (20 medal events)

The athletics competition at the Inter-Allied Games was held at the Stade Pershing from 22 June to 6 July 1919 in Paris, France. The event was open to all military personnel from countries that were among the Allies of World War I.

The athletics competition consisted of 24 men's events, 20 of which counted towards the team scores. The standard international judging rules were applied, with field event results measured in metres, and the winner of the track event being timed by three judges separately. The 10-kilometre cross country running competition (not a medal event here) covered natural landscapes around the Joinville-le-Pont with a start and finishing point within the stadium. The reduced-distance 16,000 m marathon was organised similarly, except the extra-stadium course were the local streets in the area.

The Americans, headed by team captain and Olympic medallist Richard Byrd and featuring a number of college-level athletes, clearly topped the points table with 92 compared to runner-up France with 12. Points were assigned on a by-event basis of one point for third, two points for second, and three points for first. The gathering marked a key development of the sport of track and field within France, as American personnel and YMCA sports coaches both coached and exhibited the various common American events at that time.

The foremost track athletes at the games were Charley Paddock, who won a 100 metres/200 metres sprint double, and Robert Simpson, who completed a similar feat in the hurdles. Frenchman Jean Vermeulen won a long-distance running double by taking the cross country and modified marathon titles, despite having a crippled arm from the war. The 200 metres hurdles event was won by Simpson in a time just one fifth of a second short of the world record at that time, even though the athletes had the disadvantage of one of the hurdles being misplaced by a margin of two metres. The American's winning time of 1:30.8 in the 4×200 metres relay was declared a new world record at the time, but was later discovered to be inferior to a time run at the Penn Relays one month earlier.

An unorthodox addition to the track and field events was the hand grenade throwing competition. This non-point-scoring event consisted of throwing for distance rather than accuracy and the winning distance of 245 feet and 11 inches, set by American military chaplain Fred Thomson, was declared a new world record. Two other non-point-scoring events were reserved for men who had served as part of an Army of Occupation during the war: a long jump contest and a 4×200 metres relay race. In that relay race the Italian team protested the victory, but a subsequent run-off resulted in the same outcome, with France first and Italy second. The hammer throw was absent from the programme, but two Americans—Pat Ryan and William McCormick—gave a demonstration of their speciality event.

== Medal summary ==
=== Men ===
Event	Gold		Silver		Bronze	
100 metres	Charley Paddock (USA)	10.8	Edward Teschner (USA)		John Howard (CAN)	
200 metres	Charley Paddock (USA)	21.6	Edward Teschner (USA)		John Lindsay (NZL)	
400 metres	Earl Eby (USA)	50.0	Phil Spink (USA)		James Wilton (NZL)	
800 metres	Daniel Mason (NZL)	1:55.4	Earl Eby (USA)		Phil Spink (USA)	
1500 metres	Clyde Stout (USA)	4:05.6	Henri Arnaud (FRA)		H.E. Lapierre (CAN)	
Modified marathon (16,000 metres)	Jean Vermeulen (FRA)	55:11.8	Fred Faller (USA)		Danton Heuet (FRA)	
110 metres hurdles	Robert Simpson (USA)	15.2	Fred Kelly (USA)		Harry Wilson (NZL)	
200 metres hurdles	Robert Simpson (USA)	25.8	William Sylvester (USA)		Meredith House (USA)	
4×200 metres relay	United States (USA); Charley Paddock; Marshall Haddock; Howard Torkelson; Edward Teschner	1:30.8	Canada (CAN); John Howard; LeRoy Haliburton; Fred Zoellin; O. P. Johnson		Australia (AUS); Ernest Carter; Leslie Hume; William Johnson; Harold Carroll	
4×200 metres relay (Armies of Occupation)	France (FRA); René Laubertrand; Rene Girard; Raoul Labanaot; Pierre Rault	1:33.6	Italy (ITA); Arturo Nespoli; Giorgio Crool; Gio Orlandi; Giuseppe Alberti		United States (USA); Thomas Fields; Roy Pedan; Harry Leon; John Osbourne	
4×400 metres relay	United States (USA); Thomas Campbell; Verle Campbell; Edward Meehan; Edward Teschner	3:28.8	Australia (AUS); Robert Chalmers; William Johnson; Leslie Hume; Thomas Fraser		France (FRA); André Devaux; Henri Delvart; Raoul Dumont; René Laubertrand	
Medley relay	United States (USA); Carl Haas; William Gray; Floyd Campbell; Lawrence Shields	7:43.4	Australia (AUS); Leslie Hume; Ernest Carter; Charles Edward Bergmeier; Clifford Manley		France (FRA); Jean Seurin; Charles Poulenard; Georges Dandelot; Hamed Lakary	
Cross country (10,000 metres)	Jean Vermeulen (FRA)	31:38.8	Auguste Broos (BEL)		Gaston Heuet (FRA)	
High jump	Clinton Larsen (USA)	1.864 m	André Labat (FRA) Carl Rice (USA) Dink Templeton (USA)	1.827 m	Not awarded	
Pole vault	Florin Floyd (USA)	3.675 m	Lucius Ervin (USA)	3.575 m	Robert Harwood (USA)	3.45 m
Long jump	Solomon Butler (USA)	7.56 m	Harry Worthington (USA)	7.26 m	Leo Johnson (USA)	6.62 m
Long jump (Armies of Occupation)	John Madden (USA)	6.615 m	Arturo Nespoli (ITA)	6.466 m	Eugène Coulon (FRA)	6.237 m
Standing long jump	William Taylor (USA)	3.40 m	James Humphreys (USA)	3.27 m	Émile Moureau (FRA)	3.10 m
Triple jump	Herbert Prem (USA)	14.08 m	Charles Bender (USA)	13.54 m	John Madden (USA)	13.48 m
Shot put	Edward Caughey (USA)	13.78 m	Harry Liversedge (USA)	13.58 m	Wallace Maxfield (USA)	12.87 m
Discus throw	Charles Higgins (USA)	40.88 m	Richard Byrd (USA)	40.04 m	James Duncan (USA)	36.11 m
Javelin throw	George Bronder (USA)	55.82 m	Harry Liversedge (USA)	53.87 m	Eustathios Zirganos (GRE)	48.69 m
Grenade throw	Fred Thomson (USA)	74.93 m	Harrison Thomson (USA)	73.91 m	Dominic Wycavage (USA)	66.55 m
Pentathlon^{†}	Robert LeGendre (USA)	461.0 pts	Eugene Vidal (USA)	431.2 pts	Géo André (FRA)	398.4 pts

- ^{†} The pentathlon consisted of the following five events: 200 metres, long jump, shot put, discus throw, and 1500 metres.

== Team points standing ==
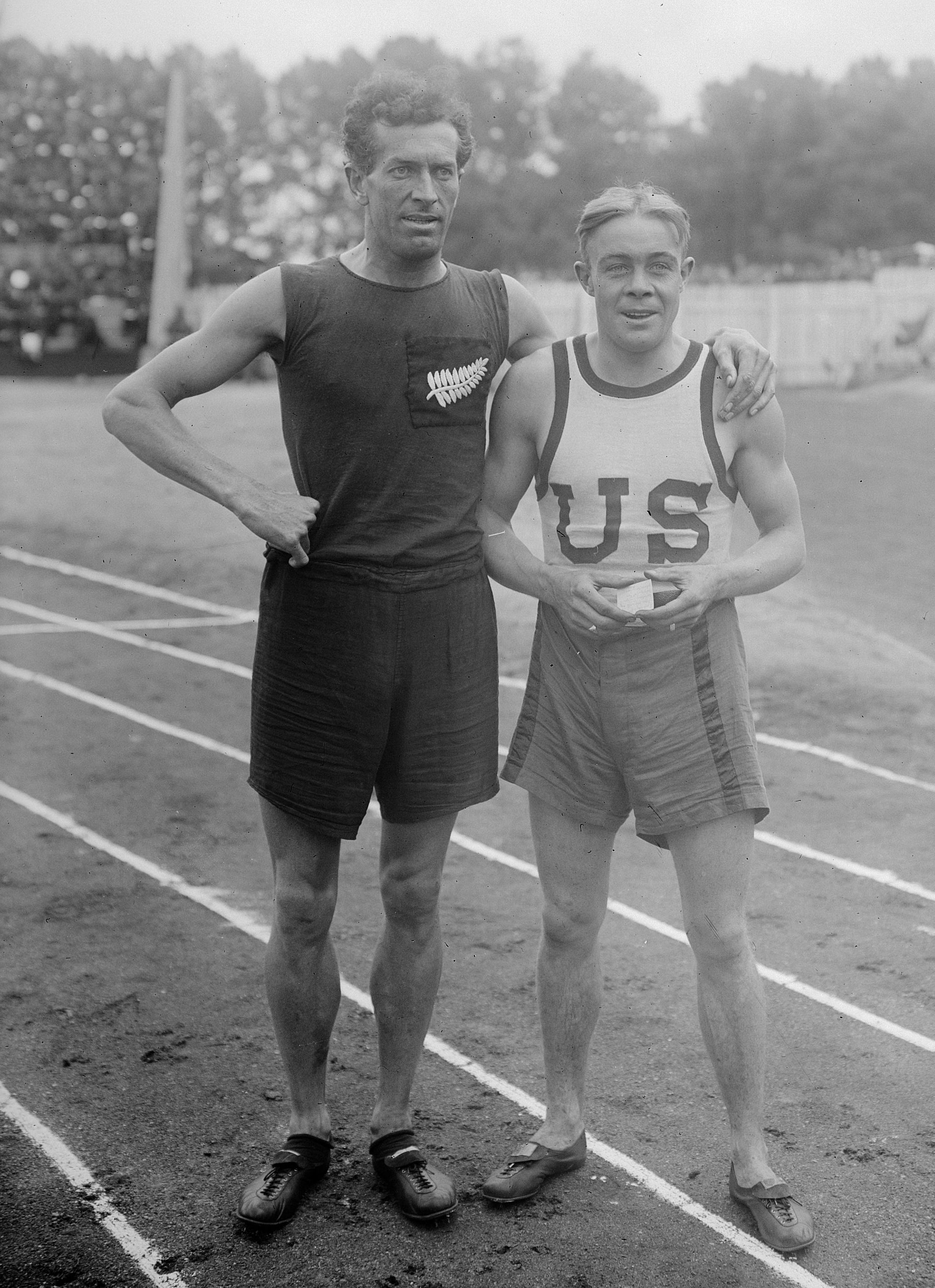
Daniel Mason and Early Eby, the top two in the 800 m, at the Stade Pershing

Host nation (France)

Rank	Nation	Winners	Runner-up	3rd-placers	Points total
1	United States	18	17	7	92
2	France	1	2	5	12
3	New Zealand	1	0	3	6
4	Australia	0	2	1	5
5	Canada	0	1	2	4
6	Greece	0	0	1	1
Total		17	17	15	49

- NB: Cross country, grenade throwing, and the Army of Occupation events did not count towards the team standings.
