= Oscar Blansaer =

Belgian long-distance runner

Personal information
- Nationality: Belgian
- Born: 13 November 1890 Ghent, Belgium
- Died: 23 June 1962 (aged 71) Ghent, Belgium

Sport
- Sport: Long-distance running
- Event: Marathon

Oscar Blansaer (13 November 1890 – 23 June 1962) was a Belgian long-distance runner. He competed in the marathon at the 1920 Summer Olympics. He was also the runner-up in 5000 metres at the 1912 Flanders championships.
