= Hendricus Wessel =

Dutch long-distance runner

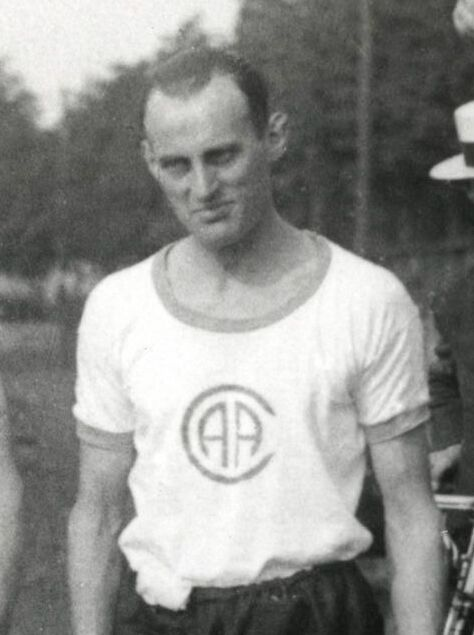
- Hendricus Wessel in 1924

Personal information
- Nationality: Dutch
- Born: 17 December 1887 Amsterdam, Netherlands
- Died: 4 August 1977 (aged 89) Amsterdam, Netherlands

Sport
- Sport: Long-distance running
- Event: Marathon

Hendricus Wessel (17 December 1887 – 4 August 1977) was a Dutch long-distance runner. He competed in the marathon at the 1920 Summer Olympics.
