= Rudolf Hansen =

Danish long-distance runner

Personal information
- Nationality: Danish
- Born: 30 March 1889 Næstved, Denmark
- Died: 12 October 1929 (aged 40) Copenhagen, Denmark

Sport
- Sport: Long-distance running
- Event: Marathon

Rudolf Hansen (30 March 1889 – 12 October 1929) was a Danish long-distance runner. He competed in the marathon at the 1920 Summer Olympics.
