= Valerio Arri =

Italian marathon runner (1892–1970)

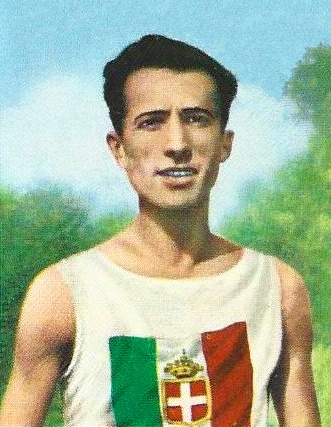
- Arri in 1920

Personal information
- Full name: Valeriano Pompeo Maurizio Arri
- Nickname: Murissi
- Nationality: Italian
- Born: 22 June 1892 Portacomaro, Italy
- Died: 31 May 1970 (aged 77)

Sport
- Sport: Athletics
- Event: Marathon
- Club: US Barriera Nizza Torino

Achievements and titles
- Personal best: Marathon – 2:36:33 (1920)
Medal record
Representing Italy
Olympic Games
Bronze medal – third place	1920 Antwerp	Marathon

Valeriano Pompeo Maurizio "Valerio" Arri (22 June 1892 – 31 March 1970) was an Italian marathon runner. He won a bronze medal at the 1920 Olympics in his all-time personal best time of 2:36:33.

== Biography ==
Arri started competing in early 1910s, but had his first major successes in 1919, when he won the Turin Marathon in a time of 2:40:47.6 and the national title over 48 km, in a time of 3:13:41. His career declined after the 1920 Olympics – he placed fourth in 1921 and third in 1923 at the Turin Marathon. Since 1996, the “Premio Valerio Arri” has been awarded to honor the winner of that race.
