= Henri Teyssedou =

French long-distance runner

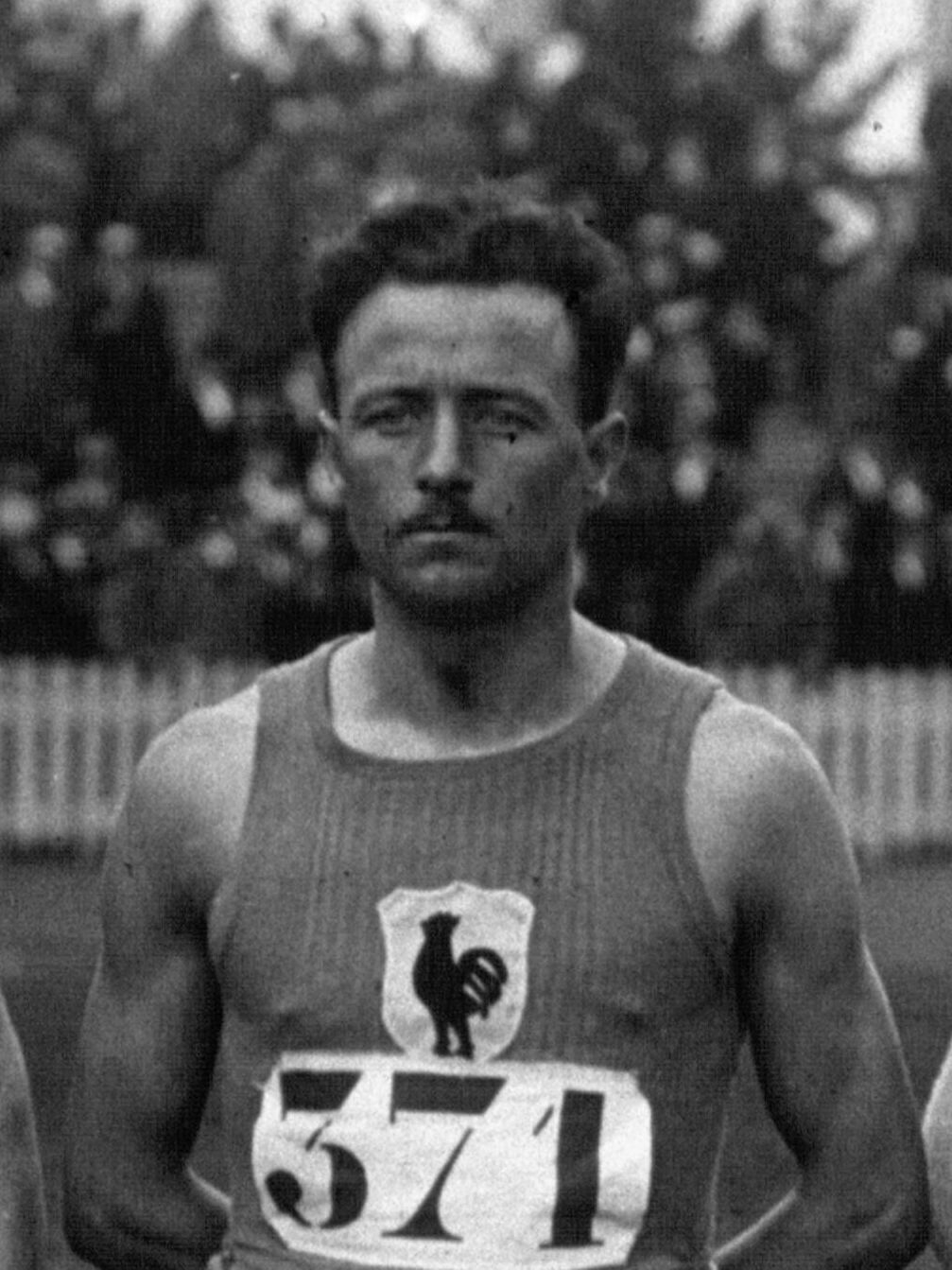

Personal information
- Nationality: French
- Born: 3 April 1889 Figeac, France
- Died: 24 January 1967 (aged 77) Bresles, France
- Height: 158 cm (5 ft 2 in)

Sport
- Sport: Long-distance running
- Event: Marathon

Henri Teyssedou (3 April 1889 – 24 January 1967) was a French long-distance runner. He competed in the marathon at the 1920 Summer Olympics.
