= Norman General =

Canadian long-distance runner

Personal information
- Born: October 18, 1893 Ohsweken, Ontario, Canada
- Died: August 14, 1974 (aged 80)

Sport
- Sport: Long-distance running
- Event: Marathon

Norman General (October 18, 1893 – August 14, 1974) was a Canadian long-distance runner. He competed in the marathon at the 1920 Summer Olympics.
