= Urho Tallgren =

Finnish long-distance runner

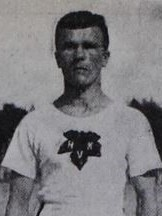
- Urho Tallgren

Personal information
- Nationality: Finnish
- Born: 9 October 1894 Helsinki, Finland
- Died: 31 December 1959 (aged 65) Helsinki, Finland

Sport
- Sport: Long-distance running
- Event: Marathon

Urho Tallgren (9 October 1894 – 31 December 1959) was a Finnish long-distance runner. He competed in the marathon at the 1920 Summer Olympics.
