= Alfred Gaschen =

Swiss long-distance runner

Personal information
- Nationality: Swiss
- Born: 14 December 1892 Auvernier, Switzerland
- Died: 15 November 1977 (aged 84) Lausanne, Switzerland

Sport
- Sport: Long-distance running
- Event: 5000 metres

Alfred Gaschen (14 December 1892 - 15 November 1977) was a Swiss long-distance runner. He competed in the men's 5000 metres at the 1920 Summer Olympics.
