= Harry B. Liversedge =

United States Marine Corps general (1894–1951)

Harry Bluett Liversedge
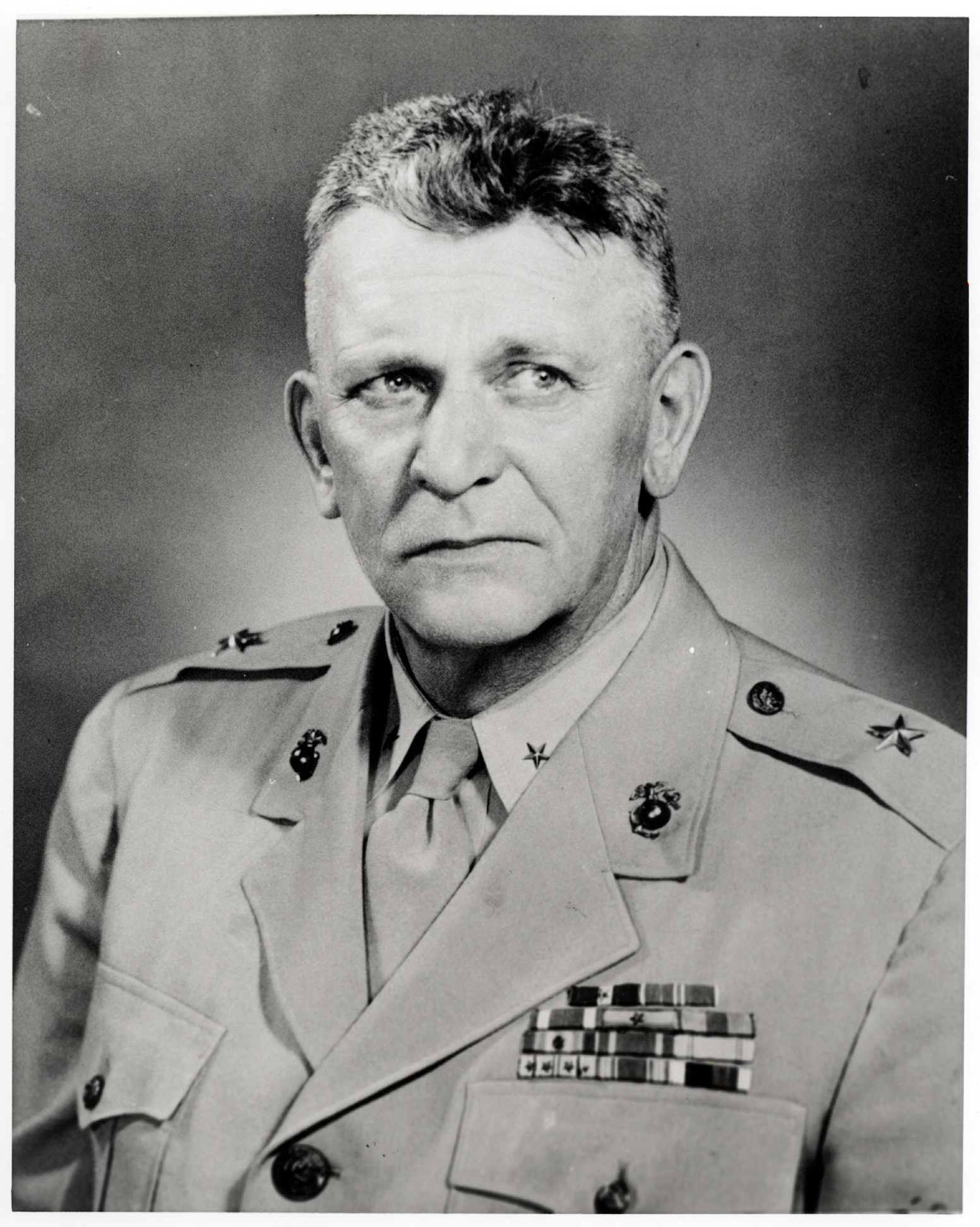
- BGen Harry B. Liversedge
- Born: September 21, 1894; Volcano, California, U.S.
- Died: November 25, 1951 (aged 57); Bethesda, Maryland, U.S.
- Burial place: Pine Grove Cemetery, Amador County, California
- Military career
- Allegiance: United States of America
- Branch: United States Marine Corps
- Service years: 1917–1951
- Rank: Brigadier general
- Nickname: "Harry the Horse"
- Commands: 2nd Battalion 8th Marines; 3rd Raider Battalion; 1st Marine Raider Regiment; 28th Marines; Fleet Marine Force, Guam; Marine Corps Reserve
- Conflicts: World War I; Banana Wars; Haiti intervention; World War II; Operation Cartwheel; New Georgia campaign; Battle of Iwo Jima
- Awards: Navy Cross (2); Bronze Star

Brigadier General Harry Bluett Liversedge (September 21, 1894 – November 25, 1951), whose regiment figured in the historic raising the flag on Iwo Jima, was a United States Marine who died in 1951 after almost 25 years of service. His last assignment was as director of the Marine Corps Reserve.

The former Olympic track star was awarded his first Navy Cross while leading the crack 1st Marine Raider Regiment in the tough jungle fighting on New Georgia. His second was for extraordinary heroism as commander of the 28th Marine Regiment at the Battle of Iwo Jima. The second citation states in part, "Landing on the fire-swept beaches 22 minutes after H-Hour, (the then) Colonel Liversedge gallantly led his men in the advance inland, executing a difficult turning maneuver to the south, preparatory to launching the assault on Mount Suribachi ..."

Two decades prior, he had been a member of the Naval Academy track squads and participated in the 1920 and 1924 Olympic Games. He also figured prominently in football as a member of the championship Quantico Marines football teams of the early 1920s.

== Early life ==
On September 21, 1894, Liversedge was born in Volcano, California.

== Career ==
=== Marine Corps ===
General Liversedge began his career in May 1917, when he enlisted as a private, and was commissioned a second lieutenant in September 1918. He was promoted to first lieutenant in July 1919 while serving with the Fifth Brigade in France.

Following his return to the United States in August 1919, he was ordered to the Marine Barracks, Quantico, Virginia, but shortly thereafter was assigned to the Second Provisional Marine Brigade at Santo Domingo, Dominican Republic, arriving in October of that year. In April of the following year he was returned to the United States and played football in the Army-Marine Corps game at Baltimore, Maryland.

=== 1920 Olympics ===
Harry B. Liversedge
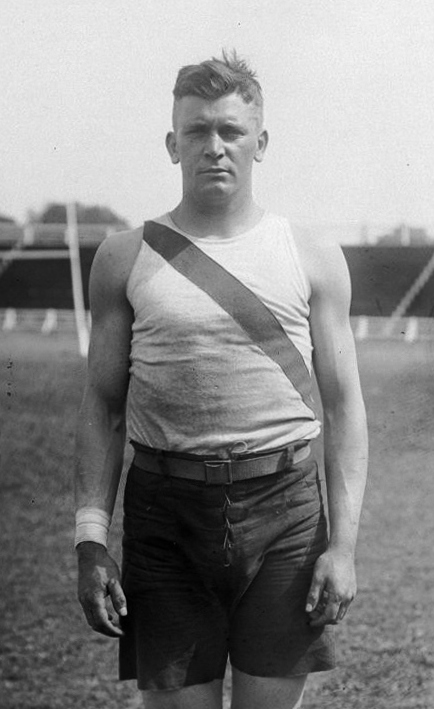
- Liversedge at the selection for the 1919 Inter-Allied Games

Sport
- Sport: Athletics
- Events: Shot put, javelin throw
- Club: U.S. Army; California Golden Bears, Berkeley

Achievements and titles
- Personal bests: SP – 14.41 m (1924); JT – 56.33 m (1914)
Medal record
Men's athletics
Representing the United States
Olympic Games
Bronze medal – third place	1920 Antwerp	Shot put
Inter-Allied Games
Silver medal – second place	1919 Paris	Shot put

In late May 1919 Liversedge passed the pre-selection for the Inter-Allied Games in Paris, France. In late June he took part in the Games and finished second in the shot put. Next year Liversedge represented the United States in the 1920 Olympics at Antwerp, Belgium, winning a bronze medal in the shot put with a distance of 46 feet 5 1/4 inches (14.154 m).

Upon return from the Olympic Games in 1920 and after a tour at the Naval Academy at Annapolis, he was ordered to Marine Barracks, Quantico in March 1922. As aide to Brigadier General John H. Russell, he later sailed to Port-au-Prince, Haiti, but was ordered back to Quantico in August of the same year. He returned to Haiti in December of that year for duty as aide to the American High Commissioner. In July 1923, he reported for duty again at Quantico.

=== 1924 Olympics ===
In the early part of the 1924, Liversedge was transferred to the Naval Academy for participation in the 1924 Olympics in Paris, France.

He returned to Quantico in August of that year, this time to attend the Company Officers' Course at the Marine Corps Schools. Upon completion of his course he was transferred to Mare Island, California. He served at Quantico from September 1926 to February 1927 when he was detached for duty in China. Following his arrival in Asia he was temporarily detached to the Third Brigade at Tientsin to act as boxing coach, and while in Shanghai, participated in the International Track and Field Meets.

In August 1929, he was transferred to Quantico and in November of the same year was ordered to the Marine Corps Base at San Diego, California.

=== 1930–1942 ===
Following his promotion to the rank of captain in January 1930, he was ordered to Headquarters, Department of the Pacific, San Francisco, in May 1932. There he served as aide-de-camp to the commanding general.

He served aboard the USS California, from June 1933 to June 1935, when he returned to Quantico. He completed the Senior Course at the Marine Corps Schools and in June 1936, was transferred to serve on the staff of the Basic School, Marine Barracks, Navy Yard, Philadelphia. He was appointed a major in July of that year. Early in 1938 he was again ordered to Quantico, this time to serve with the First Marine Brigade.

In May 1940 another transfer saw the General on the West Coast. There he was assigned duty as the Inspector-Instructor, Fourteenth Battalion, Marine Corps Reserve at Spokane, Washington. Following his promotion to the rank of lieutenant colonel in August 1940, he was ordered to the Marine Corps Base, San Diego, and was subsequently assigned to the 8th Marines, 2nd Marine Division.

=== World War II ===
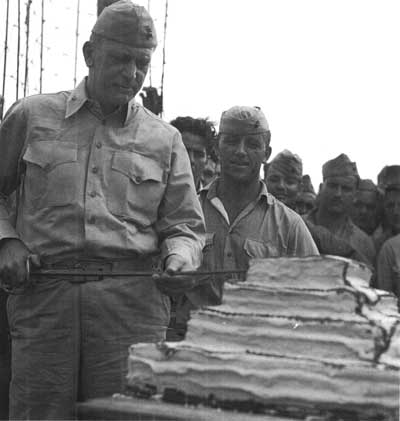
Col Liversedge and his Marine Raiders, cutting the cake during their 1943 celebration of the Marine Corps birthday.

In January 1942, LtCol Liversedge departed from the United States for American Samoa, in command of the Second Battalion, Eighth Marines. He was promoted to colonel in May of that same year and in August he assumed command of the Third Marine Raider Battalion. He led this unit ashore at Pavuvu in the unopposed occupation of the Russell Island. He commanded the battalion until March 1943 when he was given command of the newly organized First Marine Raider Regiment.

In January 1944, he was transferred to the 5th Marine Division and assumed command of the 28th Marines. He gallantly led the "twenty-eighth" ashore in the Iwo Jima campaign, for which he was awarded his second Navy Cross indicated by a gold star, each star denotes a subsequent award of the same Navy medal. Following a brief tour of duty with the occupation forces in Japan, he was ordered to the Marine Corps Base in San Diego in March 1946. In July 1946 he was assigned duties as director of the Twelfth Marine Reserve District and District Marine Officer, Twelfth Naval District, San Francisco.

=== Post-war assignments ===
Liversedge served in that capacity until he was named assistant commander of the 1st Marine Division, Camp Pendleton, California in February 1948. In May of that year, he was promoted to brigadier general, and the following May, he took command of Fleet Marine Force, Guam, where he remained until April 1950. He then served briefly as deputy commander, Marine Barracks, Camp Pendleton, before becoming director of the Marine Corps Reserve in June 1950.

== Personal life ==
On November 25, 1951, Liversedge died at the National Naval Medical Center, in Bethesda, Maryland. Liversedge is buried in Pine Grove, California.

== Awards & honors ==
His military awards include:

Navy Cross w/ 1 award star	Bronze Star	Navy and Marine Corps Commendation Medal	Navy Presidential Unit Citation w/ 1 service star
Marine Corps Expeditionary Medal	World War I Victory Medal w/ France clasp & Maltese Cross	Yangtze Service Medal	American Defense Service Medal w/ Base clasp
American Campaign Medal	Asiatic-Pacific Campaign Medal w/ 3 service stars	World War II Victory Medal	Navy Occupation Service Medal

Marine Corps facilities named in honor of BGen Harry Liversedge include Liversedge Field at Camp Lejeune, North Carolina and Liversedge Hall at Marine Corps Base Quantico, Virginia.

=== 1st Navy Cross citation ===
LIVERSEDGE, HARRY BLUETT

Colonel, U.S. Marine Corps

1st Marine Raider Regiment

Date of Action: July 5 – August 29, 1943

The Navy Cross is presented to Harry Bluett Liversedge, Colonel, U.S. Marine Corps, for extraordinary heroism as Commanding Officer of the First Marine Raider Regiment and the Third Battalions of the 145th and 148th Infantries, U.S. Army, during operations on New Georgia Island, British Solomon Islands, from July 5 to August 29, 1943. Gallantly leading his troops through dense jungle into combat against a fanatic enemy long experienced in jungle warfare and well-entrenched in strong positions, Colonel Liversedge commanded the assault with cool and courageous determination. Although handicapped by extremely adverse weather conditions, constant enemy fire and the difficult problems of supply, he skillfully coordinated his forces and those of cooperating units and, relentlessly forced the Japanese to withdraw. Colonel Liversedge's aggressive fighting spirit and brilliant leadership contributed immeasurably to the success of the New Georgia Campaign and were in keeping with the highest traditions of the United States Naval Service.

=== 2nd Navy Cross citation ===
LIVERSEDGE, HARRY BLUETT

Colonel, U.S. Marine Corps

Commanding Officer, 28th Marines, 5th Marine Division

Date of Action: February 19 – March 27, 1945

The Navy Cross is presented to Harry Bluett Liversedge, Colonel, U.S. Marine Corps, for extraordinary heroism as Commanding Officer of the Twenty-Eighth Marines, Fifth Marine Division, in action against enemy Japanese forces on Iwo Jima, Volcano Islands, from 19 February to 27 March 1945. Landing on the fire-swept beaches twenty-two minutes after H-Hour, Colonel Liversedge gallantly led his men in the advance inland before executing a difficult turning maneuver to the south preparatory to launching the assault on Mount Suribachi. Under his inspiring leadership, his Regiment effected a partial seizure of a formidable Japanese position consisting of caves, pillboxes and blockhouses, until it was halted by intense enemy resistance which caused severe casualties. Braving the heavy hostile fire, he traversed the front lines to reorganize his troops and, by his determination and aggressiveness, enabled his men to overrun the Japanese position by nightfall. By his fighting spirit and intrepid leadership, Colonel Liversedge contributed materially to the capture of Mount Suribachi, and his unwavering devotion to duty throughout was in keeping with the highest traditions of the United States Naval Service.

== Additional sources ==
- "Brigadier General Harry B. Liversedge, USMC". Who's Who in Marine Corps History. History Division, United States Marine Corps. Archived from the original on June 15, 2011.
- "Navy Cross Awards to Members of the U.S. Marines in World War II (Navy Cross citations)". HomeofHeroes.com. Archived from the original on October 29, 2017.
- Hoffman, Major Jon T. (USMCR). From Makin to Bougainville: Marine Raiders in the Pacific War, Marines in World War II Commemorative Series.
- Rentz, John M. Marines in the Central Solomons, USMC Monograph, Historical Branch, Headquarters Marine Corps, 1952.
