= Sol Butler =

American sportsman

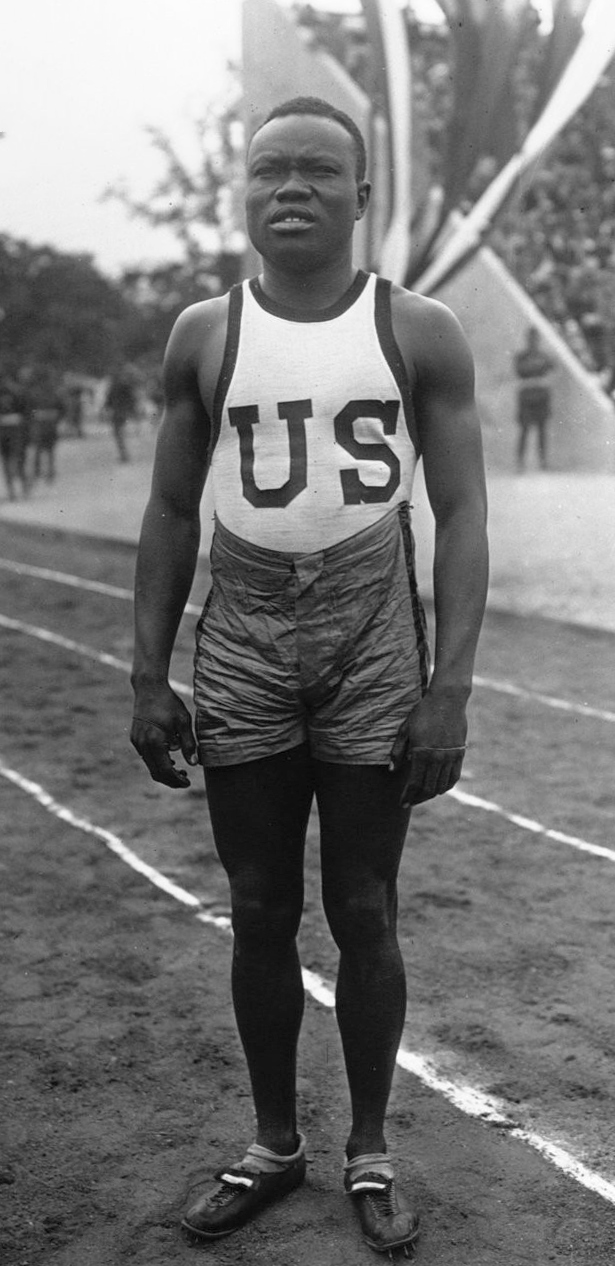
- Butler in Paris in 1919

Profile
- Positions: Fullback, halfback, quarterback

Personal information
- Born: March 3, 1895; Kingfisher, Territory of Oklahoma
- Died: December 1, 1954 (aged 59); Chicago, Illinois, U.S.
- Listed height: 5 ft 10 in (1.78 m)
- Listed weight: 163 lb (74 kg)

Career information
- College: University of Dubuque

Career history
- Hammond Pros (1923); Rock Island Independents (1923); Akron Pros (1924); Hammond Pros (1925–1926); Canton Bulldogs (1926); Kansas City Monarchs (1925)
- Stats at Pro Football Reference

Solomon Wellings “Sol” Butler (March 3, 1895 – December 1, 1954) was an American athlete who competed in American football and track and field. He finished seventh in the long jump competition at the 1920 Summer Olympics. He also played in the National Football League for the Hammond Pros, Akron Pros, Canton Bulldogs, Buffalo Bisons, and Rock Island Independents. Referenced sometimes as Edward Solomon Butler, was a name used by alternate people to gain notoriety off the exploits of Solomon W. Butler in various parts of the country.

== Early life ==
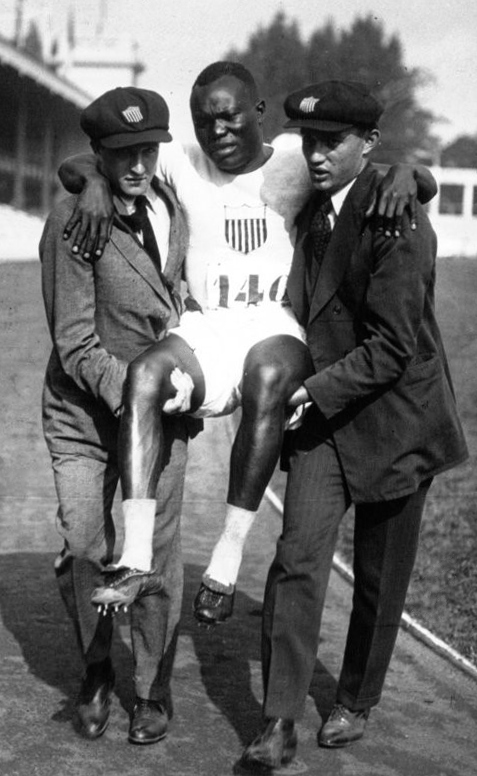
Butler being carried away after pulling a tendon at the 1920 Olympics

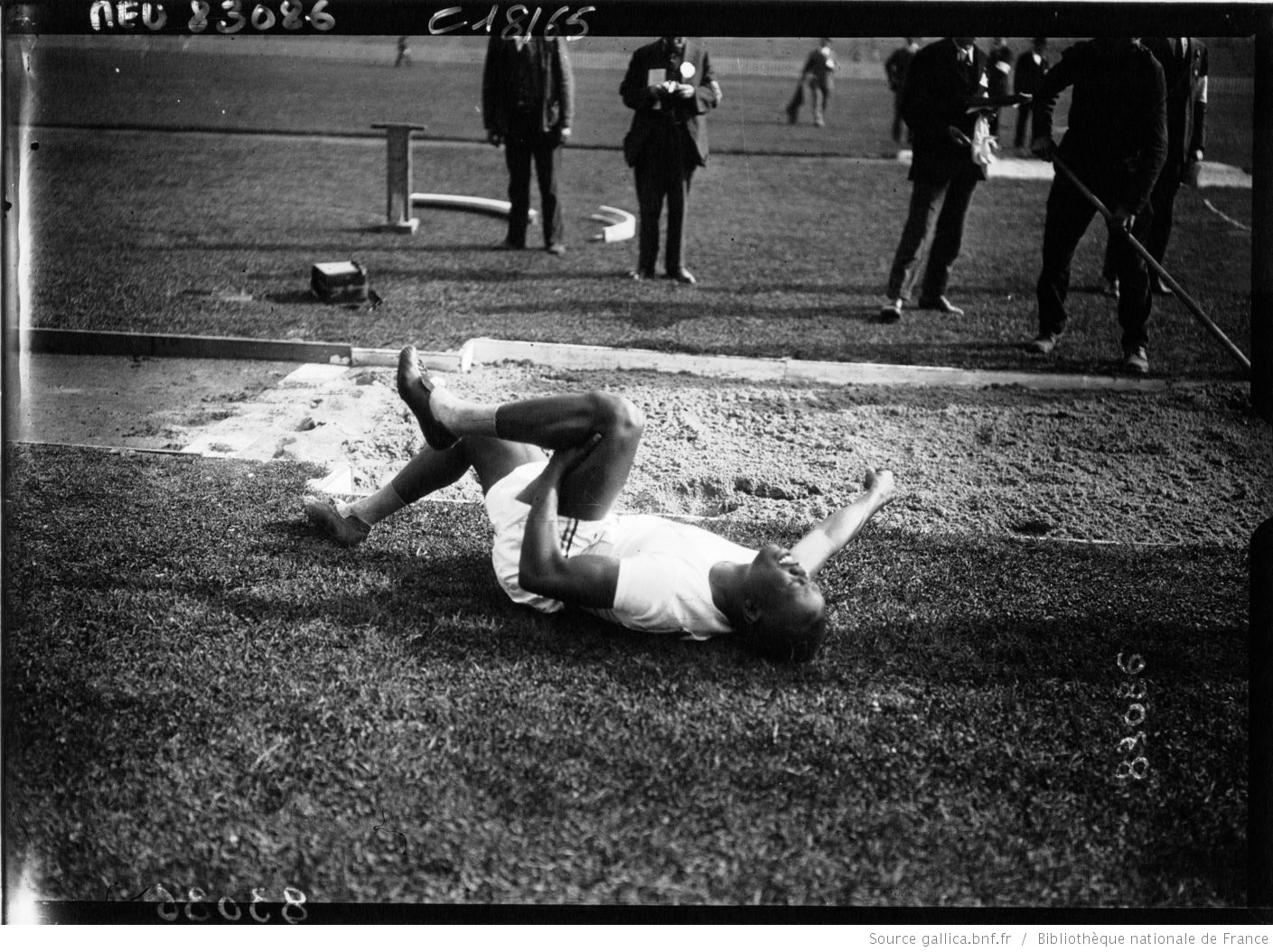
Sol Butler injury: 1920 Olympics

Butler was born in Kingfisher, Oklahoma, the youngest child of Ben and Mary Butler. His father was from Morgan County, Alabama, and born a slave in 1842; his mother was born in Georgia in 1867. His father fought in the Civil War and took the last name of Butler from General Butler whom he admired. The Butler family escaped slavery and settled in Wichita, Kansas, before moving to Hutchinson, Kansas, in 1909. "Sol", as he was known, made the varsity football team as a starting halfback during his freshman year. He led the school in football and in track and field. His sophomore year, he helped Hutchinson to a runner-up finish at the state meet after setting state records in the 100-yard dash. In 1913, as a junior in Hutchinson High School (Kansas) at a district meet he won six firsts, broke five meet records and unofficially broke a world record in the 50-yard dash. He along with his older brother Benjamin followed his high school coach to Rock Island High School in Rock Island, Illinois, for his senior season in 1914. Facing 300 of the best track stars of the Midwest in Chicago, he competed in the regional interscholastic meet held at Northwestern University. He placed in the 60-yard dash and hurdles, the 440 yard dash, and also in the broad jump. He broke one meet record, tied a world record, and won fourth place overall, competing against entire track teams.

Butler earned 12 varsity letters competing in football, basketball, baseball and track and field at the University of Dubuque from 1915 to 1919. According to Arthur Ashe Jr.'s book Hard Road to Glory, A History of the African-American Athlete, Butler was the first African American to quarterback a team for all four years of college. In Butler's day, the track and field of activity was restricted. There was no national collegiate meet and very little indoor competition. Even the Drake Relays, then in their formative years, provided no such event as the broad jump. Butler went to the Penn Relays for that competition and twice won the championship. In 1919, to illustrate, Butler won both the 100-yard dash and broad jump at the Penn Relays. Entering military service as a soldier in World War I as he represented the U.S. Army in the Inter-Allied Games in Paris, where he won the long jump. He was knighted by the King of Montenegro, who made Butler a Knight of the Third Order of Danilo. With the Olympic Games scheduled for renewal in 1920 after the wartime interruption in 1916, Butler was rated as a heavy favorite for the championship. His winning jump at Paris, 24 feet 9.5 inches (7.557 m), was two inches from the Olympic record and was considered a strong possibility for a new Olympic record. Butler went to Antwerp for the 1920 Olympics, but misfortune nailed him quickly. On his very first jump in the Olympic preliminaries he pulled a tendon and was forced to withdraw. The injury-hampered effort was a shade under 21-8. He won the U.S. National Amateur Athletic Union championship that same year by jumping 24 feet 8 inches (7.52 m).

== NFL ==
He signed on with the NFL in 1923 with the Rock Island Independents, which local accounts raved about his first appearance in the victory over the Chicago Bears. His contract from Rock Island was sold to the Hammond Pros in November 1923 for the remainder of the season for $10,000. In 1925, Butler played for the Kansas City Monarchs of the Negro leagues briefly, going 0-3. Later, returning to football, Butler played alongside Jim Thorpe of the Canton Bulldogs where he was named starting quarterback in 1926. In 1926, the New York Giants refused to let its all-white team on the field in front of the largest crowd ever (40,000) to watch an NFL game until Canton withdraw Butler as starting quarterback.

== Later life ==
In 1927, Butler returned to Chicago and married (Berenice-a native Kansan). Butler moved back to the Midwest and went on to work with the youth in the Negro districts as recreation director of Chicago's Washington Park. He worked part-time as a probationary officer, and became sports editor for the Chicago Bee and The Defender newspapers in Chicago. He was active in the Chicago Blackhawk alternative professional football team and began becoming a well known personality after appearing in movies and press regularly. He wife died before Solomon and Berenice would have any children. He would spend his time promoting and coaching youth in city parks activities within the Chicago area.

While in California playing for the Chicago All-Stars basketball team which he founded, he would stay in the state. Butler used his earnings to re-open Jack's Café, previously owned by Jack Johnson, former heavyweight boxing champion in 1932. He was named to a key role in a film by Russ Sanders in 1935 being filmed in Hollywood, Calif. after playing minor parts in a few films prior. He was signed by Oscar Devereaux Mischaux, and independent producer of more than 44 films for Lincoln Motion Picture Company. He and his brother Ben, sold cars, self-published a book on track and field, shined shoes, and did anything they could to raise money. In his later years after prohibition, Butler owned nightclubs in Chicago, set up his own talent agency and for a brief period was in the record business representing Paul Robeson, an American singer and actor who was a political activist for the civil rights movement.

He died on December 1, 1954, after being shot by a patron at Paddy's Liquors, a Chicago tavern where he was employed for seven years. Butler died of his injuries at Chicago's Provident hospital. He is buried next to his sister, Josephine Butler, at Maple Grove Cemetery in Wichita, Kansas.

== Legacy and awards ==
Today, the University of Dubuque hosts an annual Sol Butler Classic indoor track meet.

In May, 2014 the University of Dubuque began awarding the Solomon Butler Character and Courage Award.

Butler was inducted into the Des Moines Register's Iowa Sports Hall of Fame.

In 2018, Butler was an inaugural inductee into the National High School Track and Field Hall of Fame. Other 2018 inductees were Ted Meredith, Lee Barnes, Frank Wykoff, Betty Robinson, Cornelius Johnson, Jesse Owens, Helen Stephens, Eddie Morris, Alice Coachman, Bob Mathias, Milt Campbell, Willye White, Dallas Long, Gerry Lindgren, Jim Ryun, Steve Prefontaine, Lynn Bjorklund, Mary Decker, Kathy McMillan, Chandra Cheeseborough, Renaldo Nehemiah, Michael Carter, Kim Gallagher, Alan Webb, Allyson Felix, John Dye, Ed Grant, Joe Newton and Don Norford.
