= Alexandros Kranis =

Greek long-distance runner

Personal information
- Nationality: Greek
- Born: 1897 Megalopolis, Greece
- Died: 1978 (aged 80–81) Athens, Greece

Sport
- Sport: Long-distance running

Alexandros Kranis (1897 – 1978) was a Greek long-distance runner. He competed at the 1920 and 1924 Summer Olympics.
