= George Cornetta =

American long-distance runner

Personal information
- Nationality: American
- Born: January 12, 1894 New York City, New York
- Died: May 12, 1967 (aged 73) North Bergen, New Jersey
- Height: 170 cm (5 ft 7 in)
- Weight: 59 kg (130 lb)

Sport
- Sport: Long-distance running
- Event: 10,000 metres

George Cornetta (January 12, 1894 – May 12, 1967) was an American long-distance runner. He competed in the men's 10,000 metres at the 1920 Summer Olympics.
