= Arthur Roth =

American long-distance runner

Arthur Vincent Roth (December 4, 1891 – October 10, 1950) (Note: Although www.sportsreference.com indicates Roth's birthdate as December 4, 1891, the Association of Road Racing Statisticians notes it as May 10, 1892. The Boston Daily Globe reported that he died on October 10, 1950, at the age of 59.) was an American long-distance runner who won the 1916 Boston Marathon and competed in the men's marathon at the 1920 Summer Olympics.

Roth was born in Dorchester, Massachusetts. In 1912 and 1913, he competed primarily in 10-mile road races. Roth competed in the 1913 New York Evening Mail Modified Marathon and placed 31st out of 1,500 runners.

In 1914, he finished fifth at the Boston Marathon and was reported to have been from Roxbury, Massachusetts. Representing the Mohawk Athletic Club, he won a five-mile race put on the Bronxdale Athletic Club in February 1915 (27:04). Three months later in May 1915, Roth finished fifth in a ten-mile contest through the streets of Jersey City and Hoboken that was sponsored by The Jersey Journal.

By 1916, Roth was reported to be a "tracer in an architect's office". On February 22 of that year, he won a 25-mile marathon in Brooklyn, New York, in a time of 2:48:40. Representing the Dorchester Club at the 1916 Boston Marathon two months later, Roth became the first Boston resident to win the event. He was given a silver punch bowl for his victory. The bowl was eventually loaned to the Boston Athletic Association after a BAA intern observed it being used to hold beer cans at a party.

In February 1917, Roth finished third in a 25-mile race in Brooklyn, New York (2:43:35). Later that year, he finished fourth in a 25.5 mile race in Brockton, Massachusetts.

The 1920 Boston Marathon served as one of the selection races for the United States Olympic Team at the 1920 Summer Olympics in Antwerp, Belgium. Roth, this time competing for the St. Alphonsus Association, secured a spot on the team by finishing second to Panayotis "Peter" Trivoulidas of Greece in a time of 2:30:31. At the Olympic marathon on August 22, he lined-up with competitors from 17 nations, but failed to finish the race after dropping out 14.5 miles into the race.

On October 11, 1950, Roth died at his home in Natick, Massachusetts.
