= Joseph Organ =

American long-distance runner

Personal information
- Born: July 12, 1891 Sharon, Pennsylvania, United States
- Died: July 23, 1966 (aged 75) Sharon, Pennsylvania, United States

Sport
- Sport: Long-distance running
- Event: Marathon

Joseph Leroy Organ (July 12, 1891 – July 23, 1966) was an American track and field athlete who competed in the 1920 Summer Olympics. He was born in Rush Township, Champaign County, Ohio and died in Saint Joseph, Missouri. In 1920, he finished seventh in the Olympic marathon competition.
