= Carl Linder =

American athlete

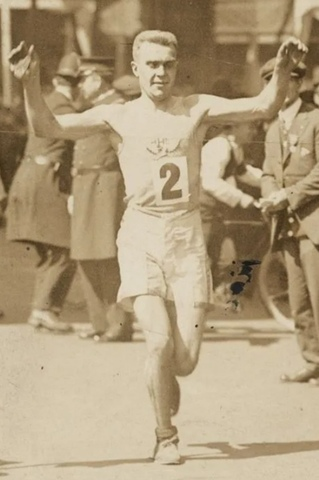

Personal information
- Nationality: American
- Born: September 13, 1889 Rauma, Finland
- Died: October 3, 1966 Quincy, Massachusetts, United States

Sport
- Sport: Long-distance running
- Event: Marathon

Carl Waino Alexander Linder (né Heinonen, September 13, 1889 – October 3, 1966) was a Finnish-American long-distance runner. He competed in the marathon at the 1920 Summer Olympics. One year earlier, he won the Boston Marathon.

Linder was born in Rauma, Finland to Karl Oskar Heinonen and Alexandra Karsten. The family immigrated to Boston in 1902, living in Quincy, Massachusetts and Brighton, Boston, where the family name was changed to Linder. His father, a carpenter, and his mother, a patternmaker, both worked in a shipyard. He became a naturalized citizen in 1913. He also worked as a pattern maker and married Irene Laitinen, another Finnish immigrant, in 1910.
