= George Piper (athlete) =

British athlete

Personal information
- Nationality: British
- Born: 5 September 1883 Chelsea, London, England
- Died: 4 December 1966 (aged 83) London, England

Sport
- Sport: Long-distance running
- Event: Marathon

George Piper was a British long-distance runner. He competed in the marathon at the 1920 Summer Olympics.
