= Rudolf Wåhlin =

Swedish long-distance runner

Personal information
- Nationality: Swedish
- Born: 2 November 1887 Östervåla, Sweden
- Died: 21 April 1972 (aged 84) Stockholm, Sweden

Sport
- Sport: Long-distance running
- Event: Marathon

Rudolf Wåhlin (2 November 1887 – 21 April 1972) was a Swedish long-distance runner. He competed in the marathon at the 1920 Summer Olympics.

Wåhlin represented Djurgårdens IF.
