= Zensaku Motegi =

Japanese long-distance runner

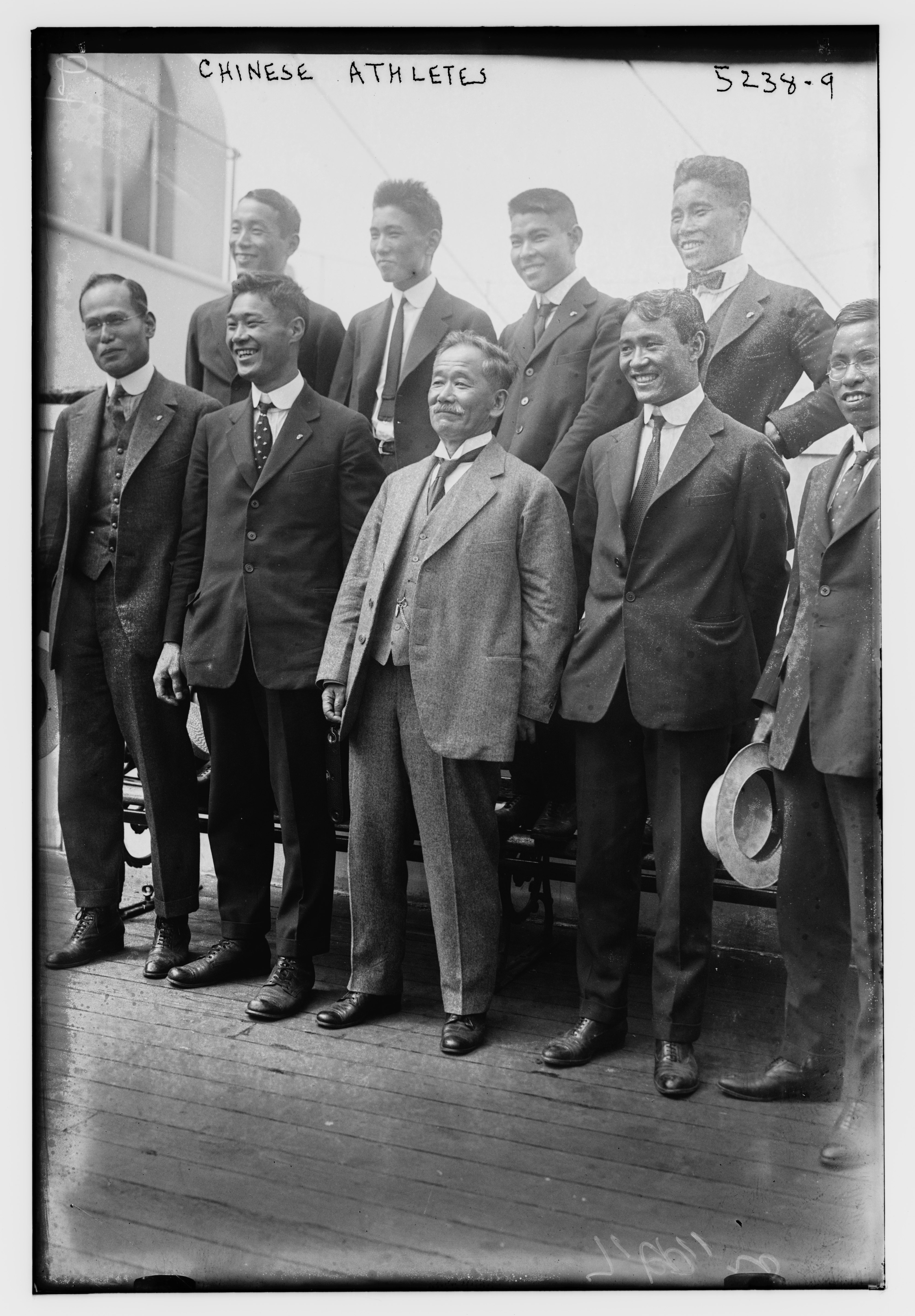
- Zensaku Motegi (front row, second from left)

Personal information
- Nationality: Japanese
- Born: 10 February 1893 Sakata, Yamagata, Japan
- Died: 24 December 1974 (aged 81) Sakata, Yamagata, Japan
- Height: 185 cm (6 ft 1 in)

Sport
- Sport: Long-distance running
- Events: Marathon, 10,000m

Zensaku Motegi (茂木善作, Motegi Zensaku; 10 February 1893 – December 1974) was a Japanese long-distance runner. His name was also rendered Zensaku Mogi. He competed in the 10,000 metres and the marathon at the 1920 Summer Olympics.
