= Pierre Devaux =

Belgian long-distance runner

Personal information
- Full name: Pierre Antoine A. Devaux
- Nationality: Belgian
- Born: 24 November 1897
- Died: 11 January 1984 (aged 86)

Sport
- Sport: Long-distance running
- Event: 10,000 metres

Pierre Antoine A. Devaux (24 November 1897 – 11 January 1984) was a Belgian long-distance runner. He competed in the men's 10,000 metres at the 1920 Summer Olympics.

== Career ==
Devaux represented Union Athlétique de Bruxelles in competition. He won the 1919 Belgian Athletics Championships and was a Belgian national record-holder in long-distance running. Also that year, he set a 10,000 metres personal best of 34:19.2 minutes.

At the 1919 Rotterdam athletics meeting, Devaux won the 5000 metres in a time of 16:41 1/2 minutes.

Devaux qualified to represent Belgium in the 10,000 metres at the 1920 Olympics. He ran 36:38.3 to place 8th in his semi-final and did not advance to the finals.
