= Arthur Scholes =

Canadian athlete

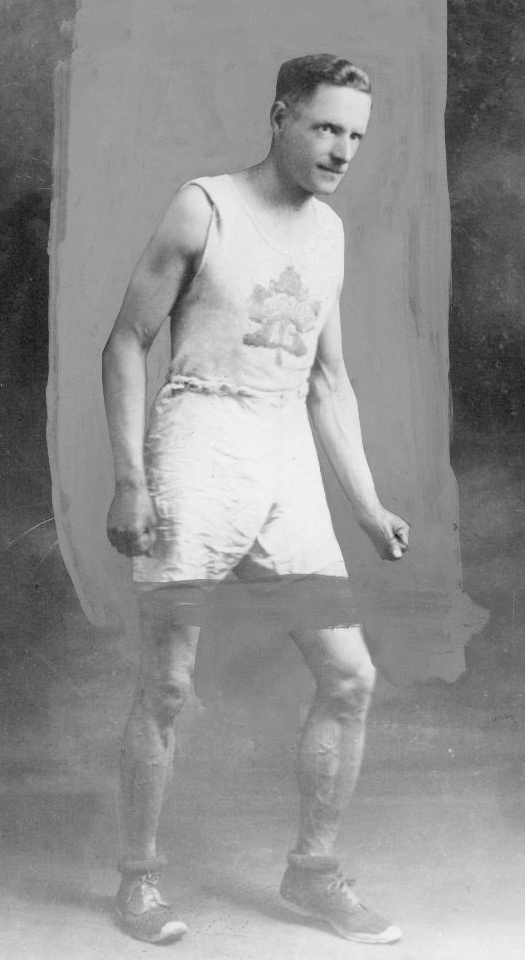
- Scholes in 1924

Personal information
- Born: August 22, 1890 Toronto, Canada
- Died: November 9, 1953 (aged 63) Toronto, Canada
- Height: 171 cm (5 ft 7 in)
- Weight: 64 kg (141 lb)

Sport
- Sport: Long-distance running
- Event: Marathon
- Club: Gladstone AC, Toronto

Achievements and titles
- Personal best: 2:48:30 (1920)

Arthur Richard Scholes (August 22, 1890 – November 9, 1953) was a Canadian long-distance runner. He competed in the marathon at the 1912 Summer Olympics and placed 15th.
