= Constantino Lussana =

Italian long-distance runner (1892–1944)

Personal information
- Nationality: Italian
- Born: 4 February 1892 Bergamo, Italy
- Died: 12 September 1944 (aged 52) Bergamo, Italy

Sport
- Country: Italy
- Sport: Athletics
- Event: Long-distance running

Constantino Lussana (4 February 1892 – 12 September 1944) was an Italian long-distance runner who competed at the 1920 Summer Olympics.
