= William Grüner =

Swedish long-distance runner

Personal information
- Nationality: Swedish
- Born: 6 May 1888 Stockholm, Sweden
- Died: 15 February 1961 (aged 72) Stockholm, Sweden

Sport
- Sport: Long-distance running
- Event: Marathon

William Grüner (6 May 1888 – 15 February 1961) was a Swedish long-distance runner. He competed in the marathon at the 1912 and 1920 Summer Olympics.
