= Amisoli Patasoni =

American long-distance runner

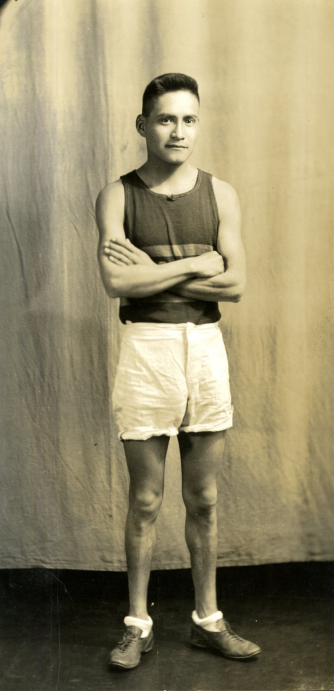
- Amesoli Patasoni, taken at Haskell Institute.

Personal information
- Nationality: American
- Born: February 27, 1901 Zuni Pueblo, New Mexico, United States
- Died: January 4, 1962 (aged 60)
- Height: 5 ft (152.4 cm)
- Weight: 100 lb (45.36 kg)

Sport
- Sport: Long-distance running
- Events: 10,000 metres, Cross-Country Individual, Cross-Country Team

Amisoli Patasoni (Amesoli Patasoni, February 27, 1901 – January 4, 1962) was an American long-distance runner. He competed in the men's 10,000 metres at the 1920 Summer Olympics. Patasoni also competed in the Cross-Country Individual event and Cross-Country Team event the same year. Patasoni ranked #4 with Team USA. He gained his spot on the team by winning the Midwestern Olympic Trials 10K in 1920, earning his personal best of 33:36.6. Patasoni was a member of the Zuni Nation and attended Haskell Institute.

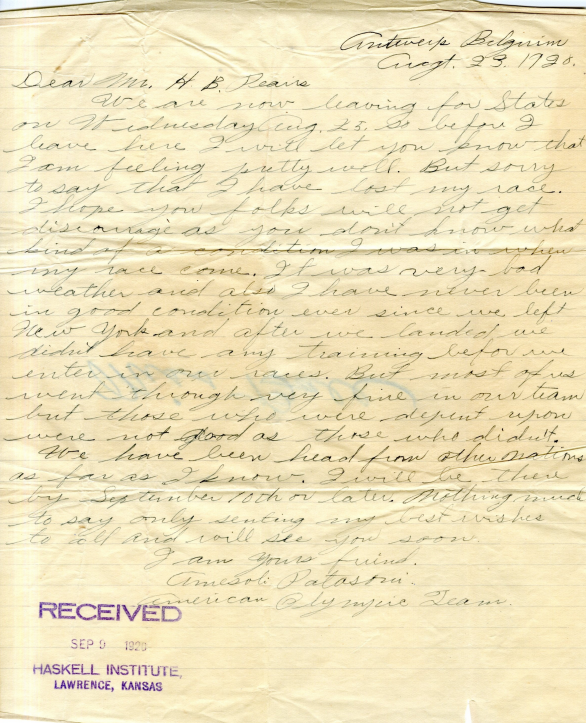
Amisoli Patasoni's letter to Haskell Institute after the 1920 Olympics, expressing disappointment in his performance.

Patasoni was one of the several Zuni and Hopi tribe members who participated in long-distance running, and was considered one of the best at the time. Long-distance running has been practiced by Patasoni's tribe for thousands of years, and was considered their national sport as of 1920.

== Education ==
Patasoni enrolled in the Haskell Institute in 1915. While attending the institution, he focused on prevocational studies (gardening, farming, carpentry, etc.) Patasoni had a positive relationship with the institute administrators, who referred to him as "Patty". While attending, Patasoni had been invited to the Olympic tryouts in Chicago and Boston.

After competing in the Olympics, Patasoni wrote a letter to Haskell about his return to Lawrence, Kansas. In the letter, Patasoni stated he lost his race.

After returning to the United States, Patasoni competed both locally and nationally for the remainder of 1920 and in 1921.
