= James Dellow =

Canadian runner

Personal information
- Born: March 22, 1887 Komoka, Ontario, Canada
- Died: February 27, 1970 (aged 82) Gravenhurst, Ontario, Canada

Sport
- Sport: Long-distance running
- Event: Marathon

James A. Dellow (March 22, 1887 – February 27, 1970) was a Canadian middle and distance runner of the 1910s. He competed in the marathon at the 1920 Summer Olympics.

== Biography ==
Dellow was born in 1887 near Parkhill, Ontario, Canada, son of Alfred Dellow and Rosa Victoria Hagel. He and his older brother William excelled in local middle-distance and marathon events.

In 1910 through 1913, the Parkhill fair brought some of Canada's best middle-distance runners to challenge the local runners. In 1910, four laps of a half-mile track, Dellow led the field, followed by three other local boys. In 1912, six miles on the same track, he was second behind Jim Corkery, with brother Bill coming in fourth. In 1913, the race was extended to 10 miles, and Dellow led the field by 54 minutes. Ernie Cook came second and brother Bill third.

After the 1913 race, the brothers moved to Toronto. William became Jimmy's trainer, and after seven years of training, Jimmy became one of Canada's representatives in the marathon in the 1920 Olympics. His brother and coach was not allowed to accompany him, but sent a coaching message by telegram which Jimmy received just before his race. The message read, "Be careful, Jimmy - Now!" Jimmy knew exactly what this meant. He was not to start too fast, to pace himself, not to go faster than six minutes for the first mile, and even if he came in 50th or 100th, to keep something in reserve to finish.

At a time when many did not finish Olympic marathons, Dellow placed 13th in 2 hours, 46 minutes. The winner was Hannes Kolehmainen, a Finn who finished in 2 hours, 32 minutes. The next best finish by a Canadian was Arthur Scholes, who placed 15th.

Dellow died in February 1970.
