= Axel Jensen (athlete) =

Danish long-distance runner

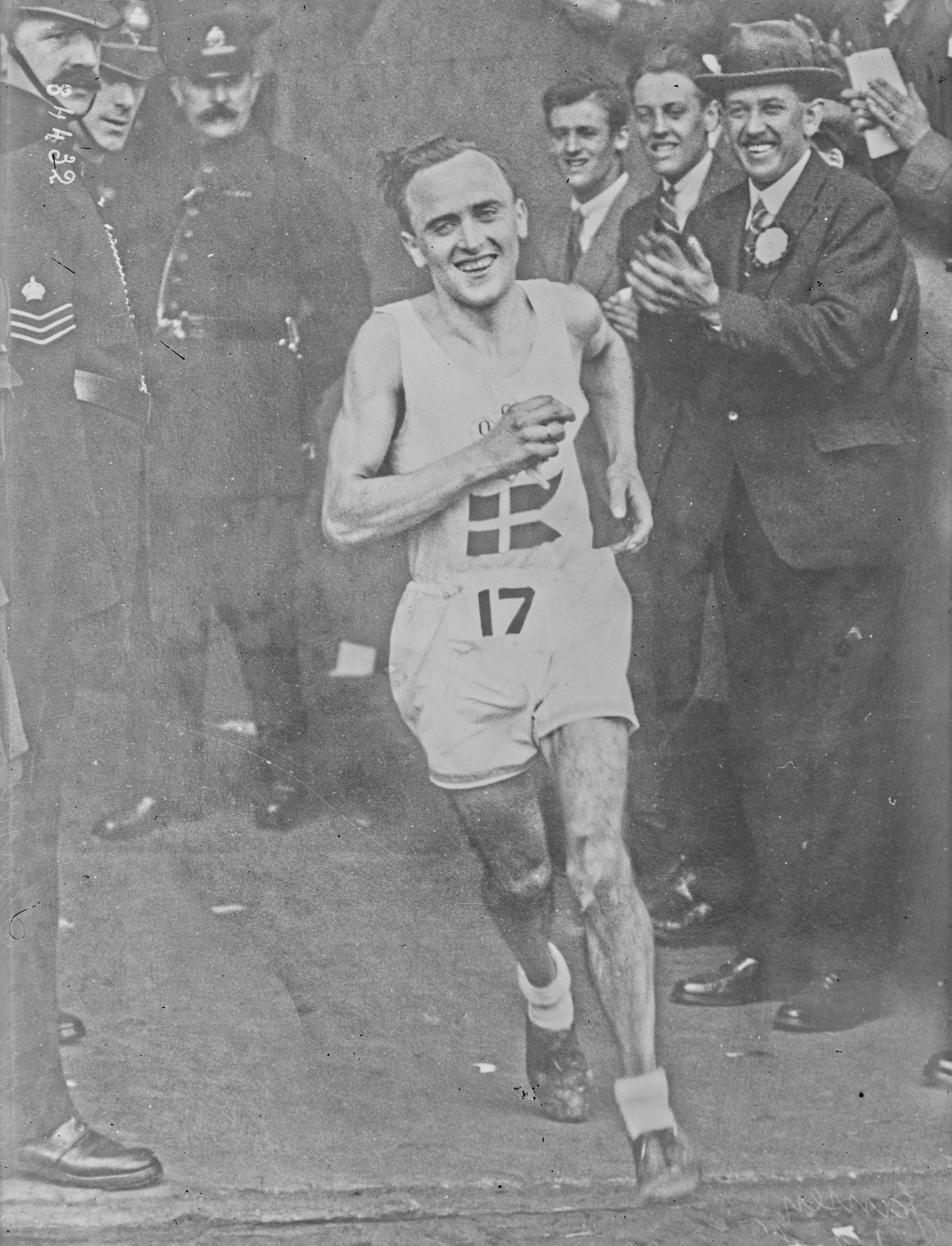

Personal information
- Nationality: Danish
- Born: 17 September 1899 Odense, Denmark
- Died: 20 August 1968 (aged 68) Odense, Denmark

Sport
- Sport: Long-distance running
- Event: Marathon

Axel Jensen (17 September 1899 – 20 August 1968) was a Danish long-distance runner. He competed in the marathon at the 1920 and 1924 Summer Olympics.
