= Charles Mellor =

American long-distance runner

Personal information
- Born: December 27, 1893 Chicago, Illinois, United States
- Died: February 11, 1962 (aged 68)

Sport
- Sport: Long-distance running
- Event: Marathon

Charles Mellor (December 27, 1893 – February 11, 1962) was an American long-distance runner. He competed at the 1920 and 1924 Summer Olympics. In 1925, he won the Boston Marathon.
