= Fred Faller =

American long-distance runner

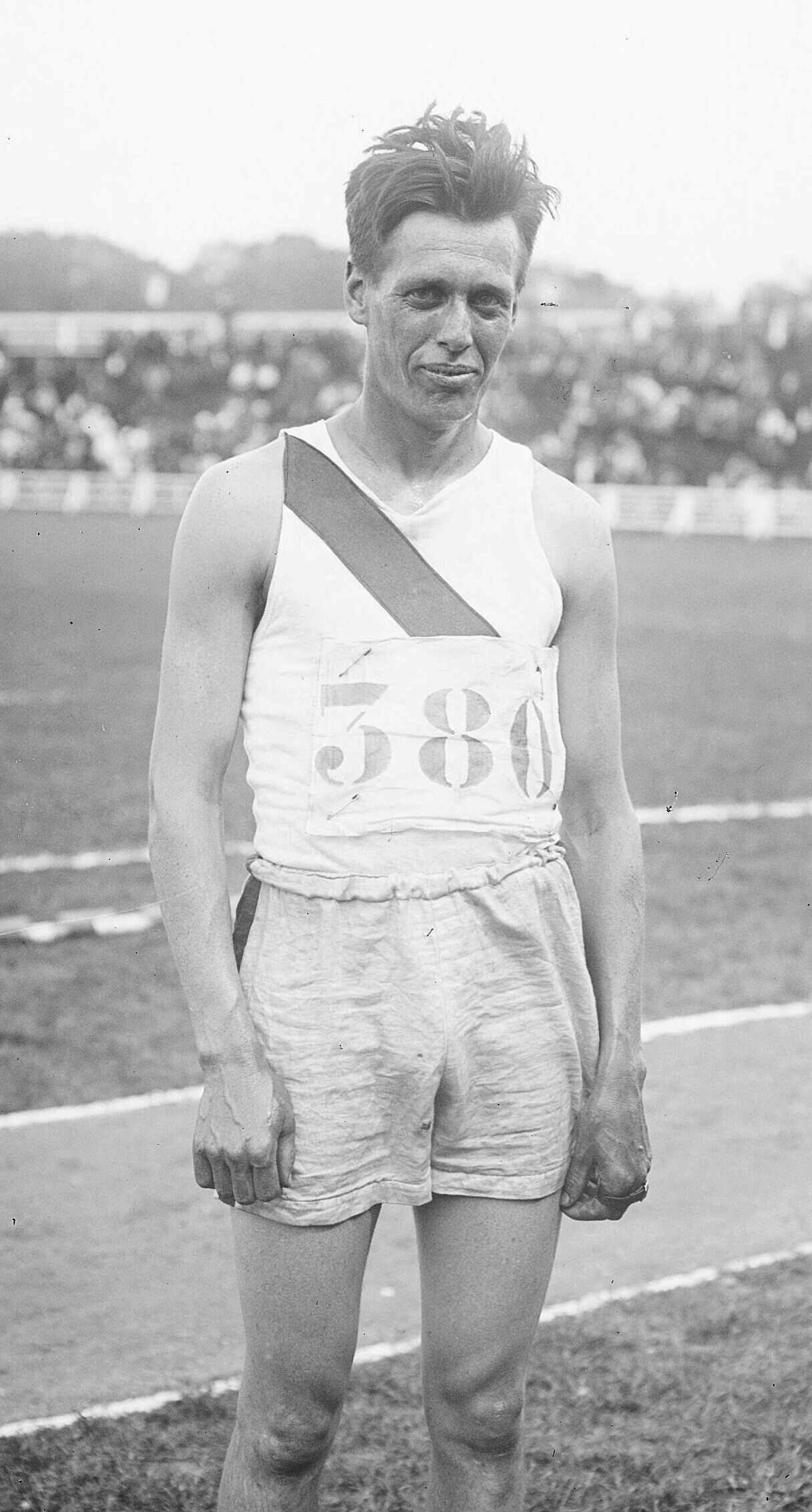
- Fred Faller at the 1919 Inter-Allied Games

Personal information
- Born: July 30, 1895 Gütenbach, Germany
- Died: August 11, 1984 (aged 89) West Roxbury, Massachusetts, United States
- Height: 1.78 m (5 ft 10 in)
- Weight: 59 kg (130 lb)

Sport
- Sport: Athletics
- Event: 10,000 m
- Club: Dorchester Athletic Club

Achievements and titles
- Personal best: 10,000 m – 32:05.2 (1919).

Frederick William Faller (July 30, 1895 – August 11, 1984) was an American long-distance runner who competed at the 1920 Summer Olympics. He finished eighth in the 10,000 m, 15th in the individual cross-country and fourth in the team cross-country event. Faller won the AAU 10-mile (16 km) and cross-country titles in 1919–20, and finished second in the 10-mile (16 km) race at the 1919 Inter-Allied Games. Faller's AAU record held for 25 years.

He was inducted into the Road Runners Club of America's American Long Distance Running Hall of Fame in 1972.

He was also a watchmaker and one of Johnny Kelley's advisors.
