= Augusto Maccario =

Italian long-distance runner

Personal information
- Nationality: Italian
- Born: 30 April 1890 Ventimiglia
- Died: 16 October 1927 (aged 37)

Sport
- Country: Italy
- Sport: Athletics
- Event: Long-distance running

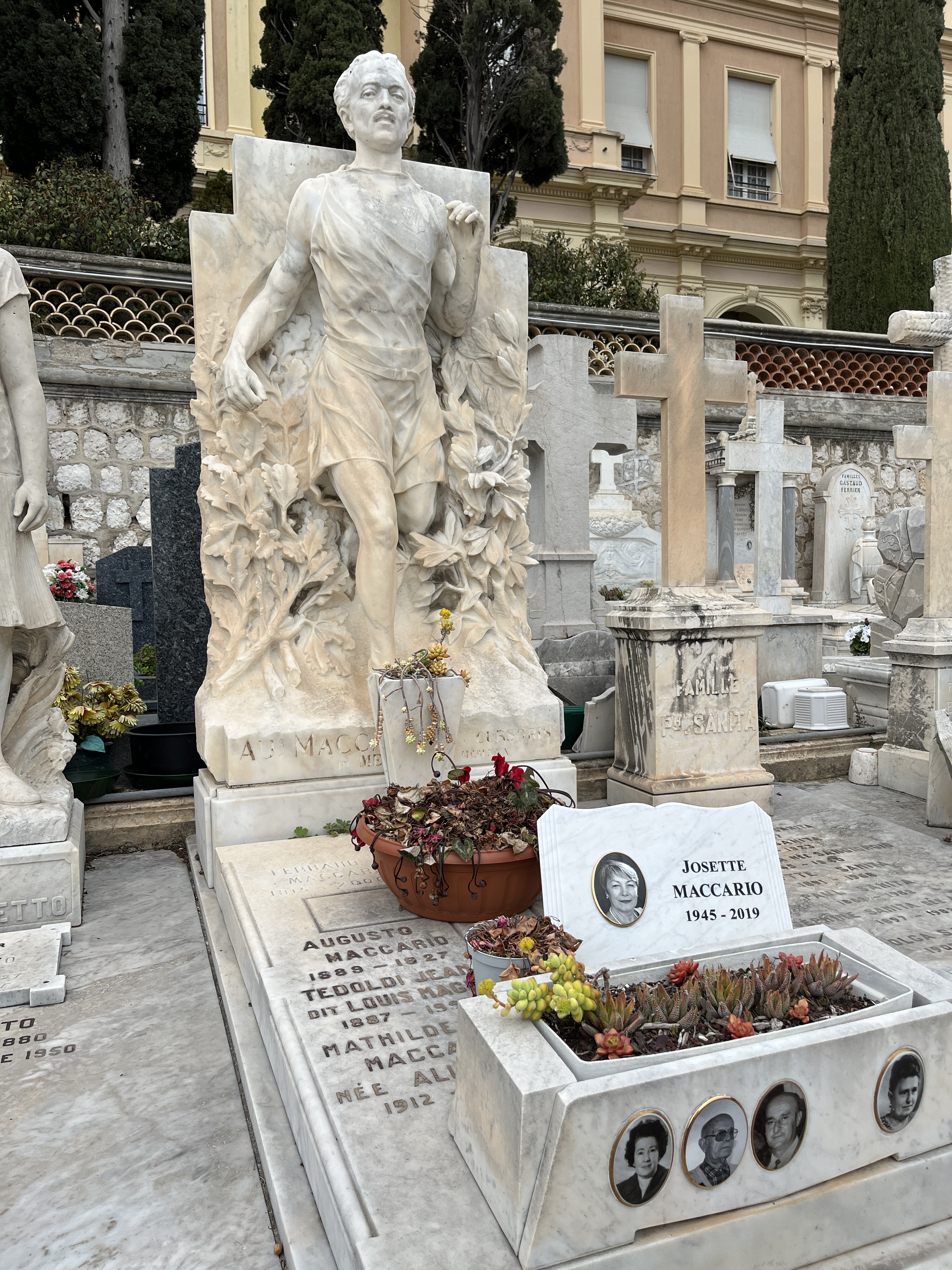
Augusto Maccario (cemetery of Monaco)

Augusto Antonio Maccario (30 April 1890 – 16 October 1927) was an Italian long-distance runner who competed at the 1920 Summer Olympics.
