= 1923 International Cross Country Championships =

- Organisers: ICCU
- Edition: 16th
- Date: March 25
- Host city: Maisons-Laffitte, Île-de-France, France
- Venue: Hippodrome de Maisons-Laffitte
- Events: 1
- Distances: 10 mi (16.1 km)
- Participation: 36 athletes from 4 nations

The 1923 International Cross Country Championships was held in Maisons-Laffitte, France, at the Hippodrome de Maisons-Laffitte on March 25, 1923. Athletes from Belgium were participating for the first time. A report on the event was given in the Glasgow Herald.

Complete results, medalists, and the results of British athletes were published.

== Medalists ==
Event	Gold		Silver		Bronze	
Individual
Men; 10 mi (16.1 km)	Joe Blewitt; England	58:11.8	James G. McIntyre; Scotland	58:13	Georges Vandenbroele; Belgium	58:20
Team
Men	France	43	England	76	Belgium	112

== Individual Race Results ==
=== Men's (10 mi / 16.1 km) ===
Rank	Athlete	Nationality	Time
1st place, gold medalist(s)	Joe Blewitt	England	58:11.8
2nd place, silver medalist(s)	James G. McIntyre	Scotland	58:13
3rd place, bronze medalist(s)	Georges Vandenbroele	Belgium	58:20
4	Gaston Heuet	France	58:27.4
5	Marcel Denis	France	58:48.2
6	Amar Alim Arbidi	France	59:12.8
7	Lucien Duquesne	France	59:16
8	Marcel Alavoine	Belgium	59:19.4
9	Bill Cotterell	England	59:23.4
10	Emile Gaudé	France	59:30
11	Louis Corlet	France	
12	Jean-Baptiste Manhès	France	
13	Archie Craig Sr.	Scotland	
14	Marcel Thoyes	France	
15	William Nelson	England	
16	Jack Beman	England	
17	Vic White	England	
18	Hugh Dare	England	
19	Ernie Harper	England	
20	Eddy Kenrick	England	
21	Aimé Proot	Belgium	
22	George Wallach	Scotland	
23	Alex Whitelaw	Scotland	
24	Dunky Wright	Scotland	
25	Gerard Steurs	Belgium	
26	Bobby Mills	England	
27	Emile Hanneuse	Belgium	
28	Georges Bertrand	Belgium	
29	W.N. Neilson	Scotland	
30	Alex Lawrie	Scotland	
31	Henri de Neef	Belgium	
32	Joe McIntyre	Scotland	
—	Leon Degrande	Belgium	DNF
—	Julien Schnellmann	France	DNF
—	Walter Calderwood	Scotland	DNF
—	F. Vandepoel	Belgium	DNF

== Team Results ==
=== Men's ===
Rank	Country	Team	Points
1	France	Gaston Heuet; Marcel Denis; Amar Alim Arbidi; Lucien Duquesne; Emile Gaudé; Louis Corlet	43
2	England	Joe Blewitt; Bill Cotterell; William Nelson; Jack Beman; Vic White; Hugh Dare	76
3	Belgium	Georges Vandenbroele; Marcel Alavoine; Aimé Proot; Gerard Steurs; Emile Hanneuse; Georges Bertrand	112
4	Scotland	James G. McIntyre; Archie Craig Sr. George Wallach; Alex Whitelaw; Dunky Wright; W.N. Neilson	113

== Participation ==
An unofficial count yields the participation of 36 athletes from 4 countries.

- Belgium (9)
- England (9)
- France (9)
- Scotland (9)

== See also ==
- 1923 in athletics (track and field)
