= Tailteann Games (Irish Free State) =

Sporting and cultural festival in the Irish Free State

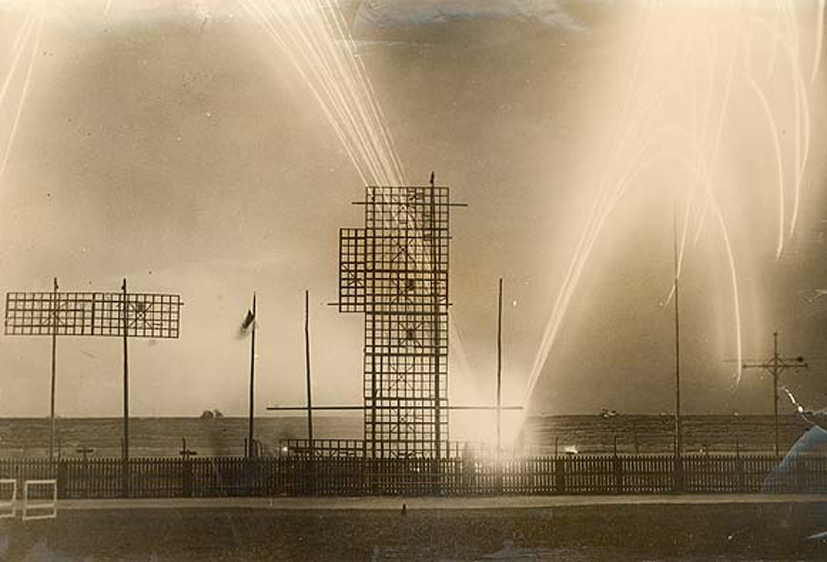
Fireworks at the first Games, 15 August 1924

The Tailteann Games or Aonach Tailteann was an Irish sporting and cultural festival held in the Irish Free State in 1924, 1928, and 1932. It was intended as a modern revival of the Tailteann Games held from legendary times until the Norman invasion of Ireland; as such it drew inspiration from the Modern Olympics revival of the Ancient Olympics.

Croke Park, the Dublin headquarters of the Gaelic Athletic Association, was the venue for the opening ceremony and many of the sports events, which were open to people of Irish birth or ancestry. The Tailteann Games were held shortly after the Summer Olympics, such that athletes participating in Paris 1924 and Amsterdam 1928 came to compete. Participants came from England, Scotland, Wales, Canada, the USA, the Union of South Africa and Australia as well as Ireland. Chess competitions were held in conjunction with the Irish Chess Union as part of the Tailteann Games. There were also artistic competitions and industrial displays. The games became regarded as a Cumann na nGaedheal project, and when that party lost power to Fianna Fáil after the 1932 election there was no financial backing for further games.

== Games ==
1924	1928	1932	1937
Inaugural games	Second games	Third and final games held	Revival considered but not held

== Origins ==
This revival "meeting of the Irish race" was announced by Éamon de Valera in Dáil Éireann in 1921. The 1922 Irish Race Convention supported the plan for an "Irish Race Olympic". Initially (as of April 1922) the plan was to be a national event with an expectation of nine counties to participate. It would also include an opera performance in the Irish language. The first Games were scheduled to be held from 6 to 13 August 1922. In order to join the teams representing Ireland, individuals were required to have two Irish grandparents (one paternal and one maternal).

A report to revive the games was debated in the Dáil in June 1922. Modern sports such as motorcycling and shooting were to be included, along with a parade of massed choirs. The possibility of out-doing the Olympic Games was mentioned: "We have got representations from America to the effect that it would be advisable to depart from the idea of confining the Tailteann games to the Irish race and seeing that they predated the Greek Olympic by a thousand years we should be justified in entering upon a more varied programme." The first games were held in August 1922, with JJ Walsh, Minister for Posts and Telegraphs, as chair and Catherine Gifford Wilson, BA as secretary to the organisation.

In July 1922, there was a main fire in the O'Connell Street, a main street in Dublin burning down 25 of its main buildings and main hotels; also to be used for the Games. A few days later it was reported the government invested 10,000 pounds sterling in the Games and 30.000 visitors were expected.

However, due to the Anglo-Irish War and the Irish Civil War the Games were not held until 1924. The meeting was launched to celebrate the independence of Ireland. The Hogan Stand was built and opened for the 1924 games.

== Symbols ==
Commemorative medals were struck for all three games, in gold, silver, silver gilt, and bronze. They depict Tailtiu, the patron deity of the ancient Tailteann Games, with inscription "An Bhainrioghan Tailte" ("Queen Tailte").

== 1924 ==
1924 Tailteann Games
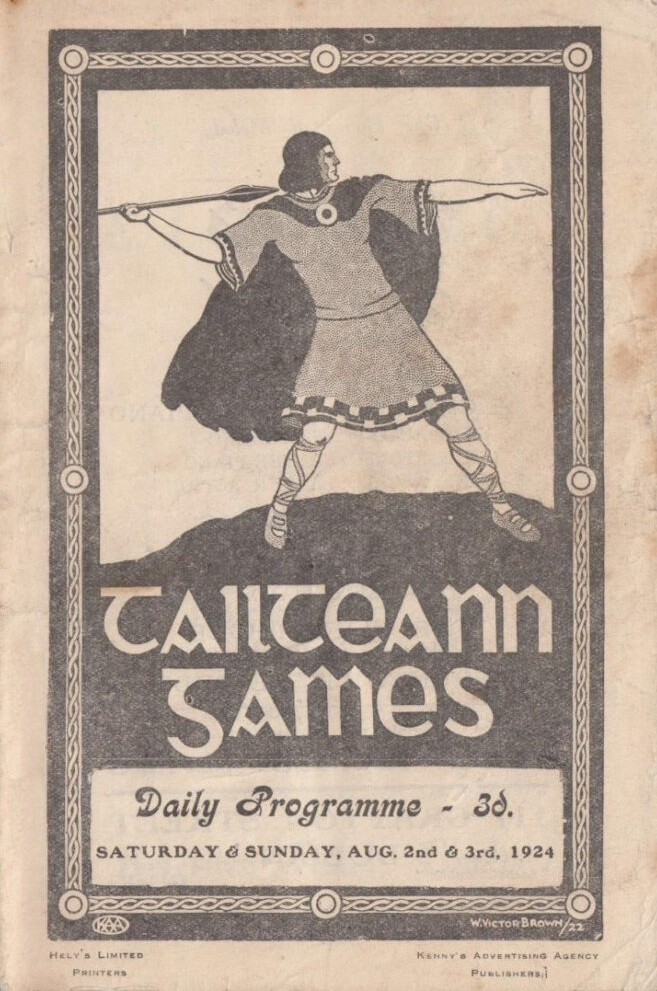
- Cover of the programme for the 1924 games
- Host: Dublin, Ireland
- Opened by: Oliver St. John Gogarty

The 1924 Tailteann Games were held in Dublin, Ireland in August 1924 after the 1924 Summer Olympics in Paris, France.

To increase the quality of the competition, some Olympic stars without Irish heritage were invited to compete as guests.

The games opened with the "Tailteann choir" singing the "Tailteann ode", with words by Oliver St. John Gogarty and music by Louis O'Brien. The ode won Gogarty a bronze medal in the literature section of the 1924 Olympic art competition. The Irish flag was carried by Tom Kiely, winner of the 1904 Olympic all-around (decathlon) title.

The dissident Irish republican movement which had lost the Irish Civil War urged a boycott of the games "falsely described as Aonach Tailteann", because it rejected the legitimacy of the Irish Free State government which sponsored the games. Rugby union was excluded from the program because the Irish Rugby Football Union was seen as "undemocratic and almost un-Irish".

Nations
Ireland (host)	Australia	England
New Zealand	United States	
Events
Athletics	Aquatics: Swimming; Diving; Water polo	Billiard
Chess (1)	Dancing	Golf (2)
Hurling	Handball	Motor cycling
Music	Rowing	Shooting
Sailing	Tennis	Motor boating

=== Billiards ===
Billiards events were held in the Catholic Club in O'Connell Street.

=== Chess ===
Run in conjunction with the Irish Chess Union, there were three competitions, the overall competition was won by the reigning Irish Champion Philip Baker, the Major Competition was won by Lord Dunsany, with Aaron Sayers as runner-up. Dublin Chess Club provided its premises in Regent House, Trinity College Dublin as well as equipment for use for the Competitions.

=== Golf (men and women) ===
The women's golf event was held at Portmarnock. The Men's golf event may have been held at Dollymount.

=== Hurling ===
In hurling, teams from England, Wales, the United States, Scotland, and Ireland played.

A shinty–hurling match was played between Scotland team organised by the Camanachd Association and an Ireland team organised by the Gaelic Athletic Association (GAA).

The Camogie Association planned national and international camogie competitions, but withdrew after a dispute with the organisers, reflecting the anti-Free State bias of the association's leadership. An exhibition match was played without the association's sanction, while an association "Ireland" team played in London.

=== Handball ===
The handball events were played in Ballymun and Clondalkin.

=== Motor Cycling ===
Races took place in Phoenix Park, Dublin.

=== Music ===
Musical events came in several types and were held in a number of venues. There were performances and competitions. Some performances including operas took place in The Theatre Royal. Some competitions such as band contests were held in Ballsbridge and some were in the Metropolitan Hall in Lower Abbey Street.

=== Rowing ===
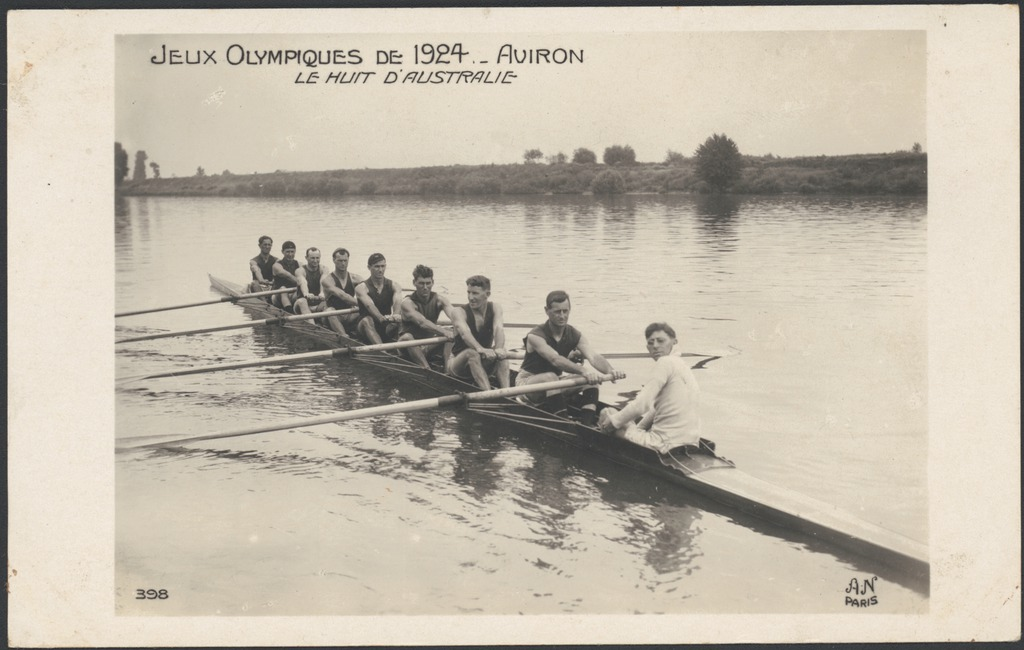
The Australian eight won the silver medal

The rowing events were held at the centre of rowing in Ireland, namely, Islandbridge on the River Liffey.

==== Results ====
Games	Gold	Silver	Bronze
Single sculls	Walter Pfeiffer (AUS)		
Four	Derry Boat Club (IRL)	Australia; Walter Pfeiffer	
Eight	Derry Boat Club (IRL)	Australia; Walter Pfeiffer	

=== Aquatics ===
==== Entrants ====
American Johnny Weissmuller and Australian Andrew "Boy" Charleton took part. The United States entered one woman, Euphrasia Donnelly.

==== Swimming ====
As Ireland had no proper swimming pools at the time, the swimming competitions of the 1924 Games were held in a pond at Dublin Zoo.

===== Men's event =====
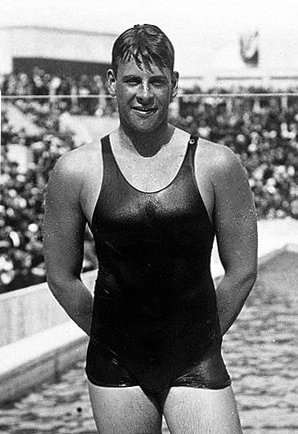
Boy Charlton who won the 800 m

Games	Gold	Silver	Bronze
100 m freestyle	Ernest Henry (AUS)	Stedman (ENG)	Radmilovic (ENG)
800 m freestyle	Boy Charlton (AUS)	Radmilovic (ENG)	Moss Christie (AUS)

===== Women's event =====
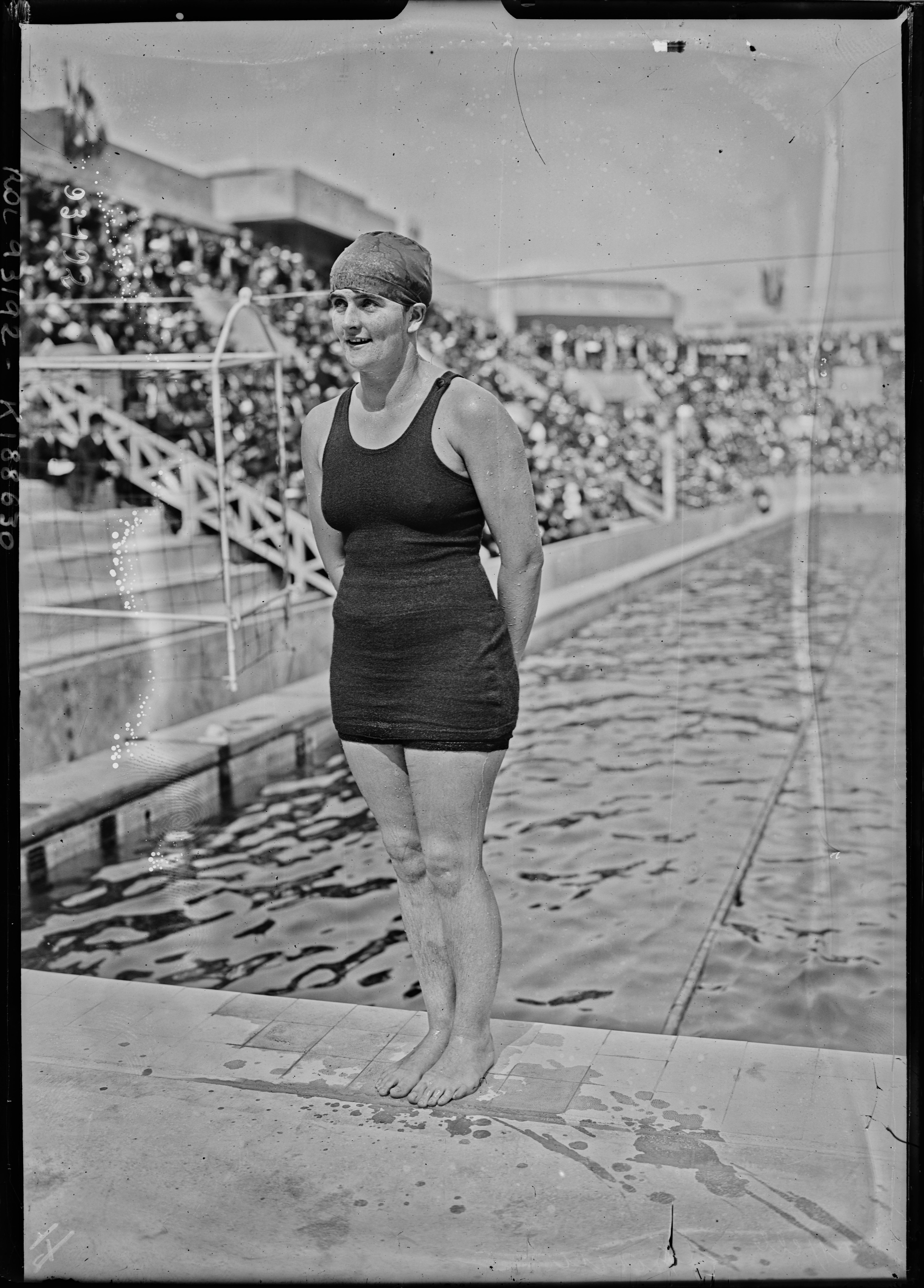
Gwitha Shand who won the 200 m

Games	Gold	Silver	Bronze
200 m freestyle	Gwitha Shand (NZL)	Grace McKenzie (ENG)	Euphrasia Donnelly (USA)

==== Diving ====
===== Women's event =====
Games	Gold	Silver	Bronze
Dive	Miss Rea (ENG)	Miss Byrine (IRL)	Miss Absalom (IRL)

=== Athletics ===
The athletics competitions were held in Croke Park, Dublin.

One of the main achievements was American Robert LeGendre winning the long jump event. His jump of 7.518 metres was close to the world record he set during the 1924 Summer Olympics of 7.795 metres in the pentathlon (he didn’t qualify for the long jump event); a distance he had not approached since then.

The American Harold Osborn, the 1924 Olympic high jump champion, won the high jump event.

==== Summary ====
Games	Gold	Silver	Bronze
100 metres	Edwin Carr (AUS)		
200 metres	Jackson Scholz (USA)		
400 metres	Morgan Taylor (USA)		
800 metres	Norman McEachern (IRL)		
1500 metres	Ray Buker (USA)		
4 miles	John Ryan (IRL)		
110 metres hurdles	D. Kinsey (USA)		
400 metres hurdles	Morgan Taylor (USA)		
3000 metres steeplechase	John Ryan (IRL)		
4 x 1600 metres relay	United States		
Marathon	D. Quinn (SCO)	J. Guiney (IRL)	P. O'Reilly (IRL)
Individual cross country	John Ryan (IRL)	Marvin Rick (USA)	Russell Payne (USA)
Team cross country	United States	Ireland	
Long jump	Robert LeGendre (USA)		
Triple jump	Nick Winter (AUS)		
High jump	Harold Osborn (USA)		
Pole vault	Victor Pickard (CAN)		
Standing long jump	Harold Osborn (USA)	Larry Stanley (IRL)	
Standing triple jump	Harold Osborn (USA)		
Standing high jump	Harold Osborn (USA)		
Shot put	John O'Grady (IRL)		
Discus throw	Tom Lieb (USA)		
Hammer throw	Matt McGrath (USA)		
Javelin throw	D. Kinsey (USA)		
56 lbs weight throw over bar	John O'Grady (IRL) Pat McDonald (USA)		
56 lbs weight throw without follow	Paddy Bermingham (IRL)		
Decathlon	Harold Osborn (USA)	William Shanahan (IRL)	D. Kinsey (USA)

==== Cross-country ====
The cross country race was over 3800 meters and was open to teams or individuals.

===== Individual =====
Rank	Athlete	Nation	Time
1st place, gold medalist(s)	John Ryan	Ireland	
2nd place, silver medalist(s)	Marvin Rick	United States	
3rd place, bronze medalist(s)	Russell Payne	United States	
4			
5			
6		England	
7	John G. Bell	United States	
8		England	
9			
10		England	

===== Team =====
Rank	Nation	Time
1st place, gold medalist(s)	United States	
2nd place, silver medalist(s)	England	
3rd place, bronze medalist(s)		

=== Sailing ===
The Sailing events of 1924 were sailed in Dún Laoghaire on Saturday in the second week of August.

Games	Gold	Silver	Bronze
Yachts over 10 tons	'Mavourneen', Mr. F. St. J. Worrall.		
25 ft & 21 ft	'Geraldine', Mr. W. McDowell.	'Darthula' Mr. W. Graham	'Innisfallen' Messrs. Nesbitt & Weir.
Yachts up to 10 tons	'Klysma', Mr. C. O'Loughlin	'Bonita' Messrs. Hartnell & McGoogan	'Mercia III' Mr.W.J. Smalldridge
17 ft	'Echo', Mr. R. Hall	Bobolink	Silver Moon
Seapoint [Sailing Club] Class No. 2 & Clontarf [Yacht & Boat Club] class and similar classes	'Falcon', Messrs. Hutchinson and Paine		
Shannon-One-Design	S47 Edgar H. Waller	S32 N. Lionel Lyster	S35 A.G. Waller
Water Wags	'Coquette', Mr. George H. Jones	Mollie, A.E. Snow	Tomboy, Messrs Barrett & Donnelly

Shannon-one-design (full results) 4 S36 R. White; 5 S34 Walter Levinge; 6 S45 Tom Feely; 7 S43 Jocelyn H. de W. Waller

=== Motor Boating ===
The Motor Boat event of 1924 took place in Dublin Bay in conjunction with the sailing regatta. Match on declared speed, allowances conceded at start. First boat at 4.15 pm. Shantax. winner.

=== Tennis ===
An international tennis tournament was organised between Ireland and Australia.

Irish Cecil Campbell beat Australian James Willard.

The singles competitions were won by Australia with the doubles competitions by Ireland. Ireland won the overall tournament.

=== Water polo ===
Ireland won the water polo tournament.

=== Cultural programme ===
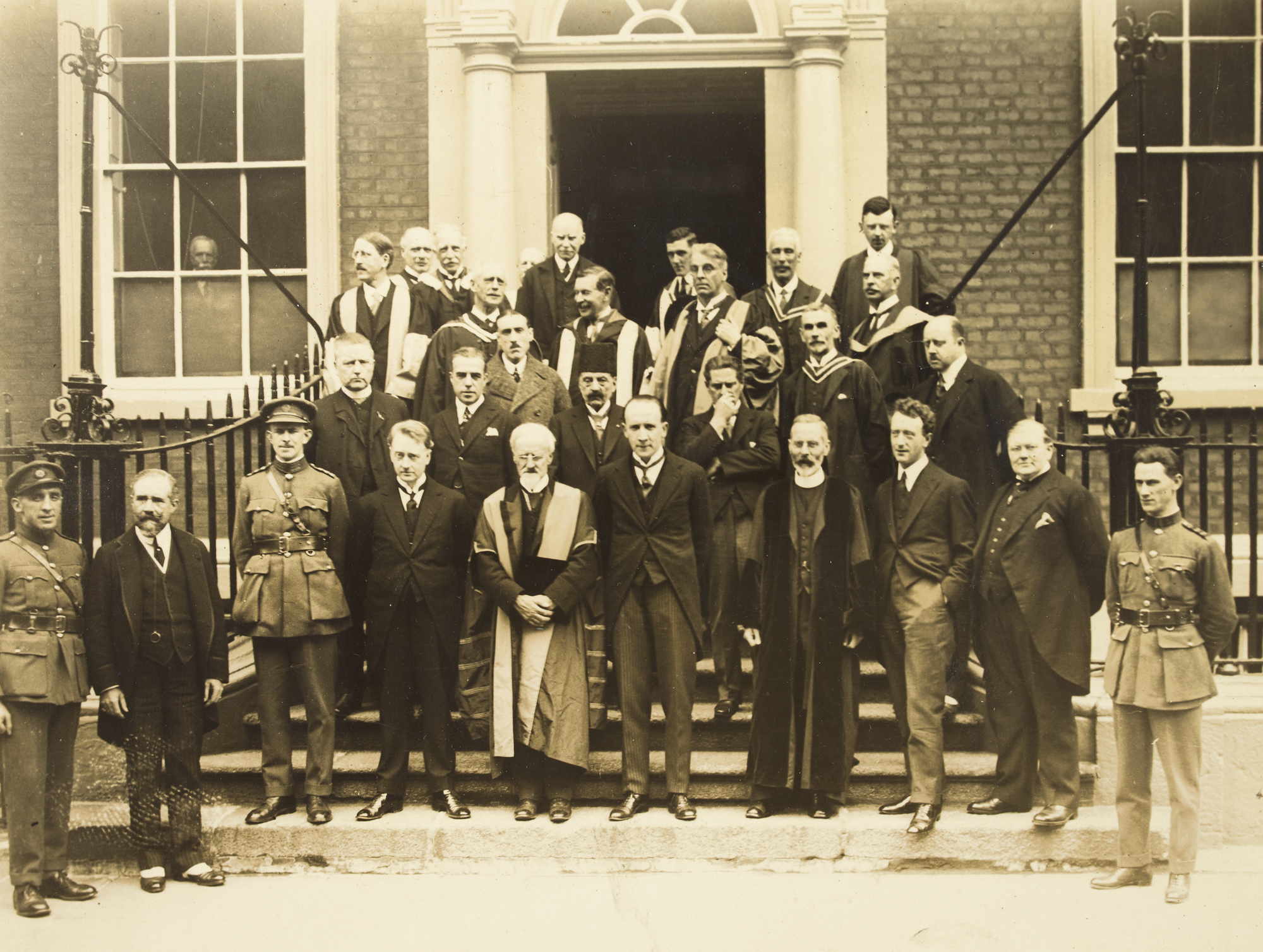
Irish and foreign dignitaries at the RIA

W. B. Yeats persuaded the Royal Irish Academy to award prizes. The gold medal went to Stephen MacKenna for his translation of Plotinus; other winners were Oliver Gogarty, Francis Stuart, and James Stephens. A banquet presided over by T. M. Healy, the Governor-General of the Irish Free State, had an "oddly assorted" group of guests invited by Yeats, including Augustus John, Sir Edwin Lutyens, writers Compton Mackenzie, G. K. Chesterton, Lennox Robinson, and Carlos Magalhães de Azeredo; cricketers Ranjitsinhji and C. B. Fry; and diplomats Willem Hubert Nolens and Erik Palmstierna. Chesterton accepted the medal on his behalf of the absent MacKenna, who later refused it.

An art and craft exhibition at the Royal Hibernian Academy displayed 1,597 works, more than half entered for competition in 32 categories. The overall "Tailteann Trophy" went to Seán Keating's Homage to Hugh Lane. Other gold medallists included Margaret Clarke, Francis Doyle Jones, Letitia Hamilton, Power O'Malley, and Patrick Tuohy.

At the Theatre Royal two recent operas by Irish composers were performed: Geoffrey Molyneux Palmer's Sruth na Maoile (1922) and Harold White's Seán the Post (1924), along with Shamus O'Brien (1896) by Charles V. Stanford. The last was not successful: "there seemed to be a greater number of people in the orchestra than in the audience".

In the genre painting competition, Charles Lamb won a silver medal for Dancing at a Northern Crossroads, depicting a traditional crossroads dance.

== 1928 ==
In 1928, at the awards ceremony in the Iveagh Gardens, the pageant The Coming of Fionn by Seamus MacCall was staged. At least seven nations participated at the 1928 Games. New Zealand announced in December 1927 to take part in the Games.

Events
athletics	billiards	boxing
camogie	chess	cycling
Gaelic football	golf	gymnastics
Gaelic handball	hurling	motorcycling
rowing	swimming	
Nations
Ireland (host)	Australia	Canada
England	New Zealand	Scotland
South Africa	United States	

=== Athletics ===
The athletics competitions took place from 15 August to 18 August 1928.

In Dublin an international athletics meeting was organized with many medalists who competed at the 1928 Summer Olympics. The meeting only included events for men. However, for women a main international meeting was organized after the Tailteann Games in London.

In January 1928, it was reported that the American athletics association only allowed American athletes of Irish descent to go to Dublin for the Games.

Event	Gold		Silver	Bronze
100 metres	Warren Montabone (CAN)	10.6	John Fitzpatrick (CAN)	Ralph Adams (CAN)
200 metres	Bal	21.6 s*		
800 metres	Phil Edwards (CAN)	1:52	Lloyd Hahn (USA)	Alex Wilson (CAN)
1500m metres	Lloyd Hahn (USA)	4:02.2		
Marathon	Joie Ray (USA)	2h 31:25.4	Matthew Steytler (RSA)	Adams (SCO)
110 metres hurdles	Sid Atkinson (RSA)			
1200 metres relay	Canada		United States	
High jump	Harold Osborn (USA)	1.93 m		
Standing high jump	Harold Osborn (USA)			
Long jump	Alfred Bates (USA)			
Triple jump	Nick Winter (AUS)			Eamonn Fitzgerald (IRL)
Hammer throw	Pat O'Callaghan (IRL)	51.87 m		

* Bal ran the 220 yards in 21.8 seconds.

=== Chess ===
The 1928 Games was won by John O'Hanlon a multiple Irish Champion.

=== Rowing ===
Was held on the River Lee in Cork.

=== Swimming ===
Took place in Blackrock baths

=== Tug of war ===
The Barnacullia tug of war team (mostly composed of stonecutters) beat the Guinness tug of war team.

=== Motor Boating ===
The Motor Boat event of 1928 took place at Ballyglass, County Westmeath, home of the Lough Ree Yacht Club, and Motor Yacht Club of Ireland, on 16 August. Races took place in various classes:

- Race 1. Free for all sweepstakes. 1st. 'Fiend' J.W. Shillan. 2nd. 'Irish Express' Major H. Waller. 3rd. 'Miss Chief' J. C. Healy.
- Race 2. Handicap for boats with outboard engines not exceeding 350cc. Boat min. weight 120 lbs. 1st. 'Miss Chief' J.C. Healy. 2nd. 'Busy Bee' Lt. Col. Mansfield. 3rd. 'Imp' D. Tidmarsh.
- Race 3. Handicap for boats with inboard engines exceeding 20'-0". 1st. 'Shrike' Lt. Col. Mansfield. 2nd.'La Vague' Dr. V. S. Delany. 3rd. 'Janet' J. C. Healy.
- Race 4. Handicap for boats with outboard engines of unlimited cc. Boat min. weight 140 lbs. 1st. 'Baby Costume' L. Hogan. 2nd.'Fiend' J. W. Shillan. 3rd. 'Busy Bee' Lt. Col. Mansfield.
- Race 5. Free for all scratch race. Outboard engines. 1st. 'Fiend' J. W. Shillan. 2nd. 'Miss Chief' J. C. Healy. 3rd. 'Busy Bee' Lt. Col. Mansfield.
- Race 6. Handicap race for boats with inboard engines, length not exceeding 20 ft. 1st. 'Udra' Dr. V.S. Delany. 2nd. 'Mermaid' Mr. J. Ryan.

=== Sailing ===
Race 1. Yachts over 10 tons and under 40 tons. race of 24 miles. 'Mavourneen' F.S.J. Worrell

== 1932 ==
With the 1932 Summer Olympics being held in Los Angeles, the Tailteann Games was originally scheduled for 1931 to avoid a clash, but postponed to 1932, which meant Olympic athletes from Ireland or abroad could not be present. The Games' main backer, minister J. J. Walsh, lost office when Fianna Fáil took power after the 1932 election, and public funding was cut. Against a background of the Great Depression and the Anglo-Irish Trade War, the Games cut from two weeks to one; they made a £12 profit.

The change of Irish government left the Tailteann games without government support, and as a result there were very few competitions.

=== Cycling ===
The cycling event was won by John Woodcock.

=== Chess ===
The third games was won again by John O'Hanlon who was also Irish Champion in 1932.

=== Gymnastics ===
These events were held in the Mansion House in Dublin.

=== Handball, National and International ===
Events were held in Phoenix Park, Dublin.,

=== Rowing ===
The Regatta was held in Drogheda on 29 and 30 June.

=== Sailing ===
Held in Dublin Bay on 14 August 1928. Event 1. yachts over 10 tons and under 40 tons.

=== Sailing ===
The sailing events were hosted by the National Yacht Club, Dun Laoghaire in July 1932.

Event	Result
Cruisers under 10 tons	Mercia III, W. J. Smalldridge (5h 22m 31s); Sho Shi, T.A. Cotter (5:31:15); Eileen, J.A. Magauran (5:39:35) (Winner); Alethea, J. Kelly.
21-footers	Maureen (winner) Newsom & Stephens; Geraldine, W McDowell; Oola, F.E. Bitmingham; Innisfallen, J.T. Wigham.
17-footers	Pauline, Dr. H.J. Wright; Zaida, Dr. H.H. Poole; Rita, Mr. A. O'Reilly; Mimosa, Mr. R.N. Guinness; Bobolink, Mr. A. McMullen; Leila, Mr. W. McBride; Hera, Mr. A.E. Nesbitt; Echo, Mr. R. Hall; Anita, Mr. J. Millar; Oona, Dr. D & Miss Douglas; Deilginis, Capt. O'B. Twohig; Rosemay, Messrs. Sterling & Thompson; Silver Moon (carried away her masthead before the preparatory gun).
Water wags	Pansy, Dr. J. H. Stephens; Phyllis, G.A. Newsom; Coquette, George Jones; Tomboy, Mr. &. Mrs. Donolly; Mollie, Dr & Mrs Henry; Blue Bird, Dr. G. Pugin; Amyl, Mr. & Mrs. Shackleton; Nesta, A.W. Bayne; Marie Louise, E.G. Peake; Cupid, S. S. Harman; Alfa, G.D. Findlater; Kittiwake, E.A. Brittain (fouled mark); Mary Kate, A.R. O'Connor (retired).

== 1939 ==
In 1937 Éamon de Valera organised an inter-departmental committee into the feasibility of staging another games, which reported in June that it would be possible to stage one in 1939. De Valera used the split in Irish athletics governance as an excuse to defer consideration, to the chagrin of J. J. Walsh. The onset of the Second World War deferred any progress and nothing further happened after the war.

== Sources ==
- Bell, Daniel (17 November 2011). "Tailteann Games". Encyclopedia of International Games. Vol. 2. McFarland. pp. 373–375. ISBN 9781476615271.
- Cronin, Mike (July 2003). "Projecting the Nation through Sport and Culture: Ireland, Aonach Tailteann and the Irish Free State, 1924–32". Journal of Contemporary History. 38 (3): 395–411. doi:10.1177/0022009403038003004. ISSN 0022-0094. JSTOR 3180644. S2CID 146215048 – via academia.edu.
- Cronin, Mike (Autumn 2005). "The State on Display: The 1924 Tailteann Art Competition". New Hibernia Review / Iris Éireannach Nua. 9 (3). University of St. Thomas (Center for Irish Studies): 50–71. doi:10.1353/nhr.2005.0050. JSTOR 20558012. S2CID 143540213.
- Dean, Joan Fitzpatrick (2014). All Dressed Up: Modern Irish Historical Pageantry. Syracuse University Press. ISBN 9780815652847.
- Reynolds, Paige (2007). "Fictions in the Free State: the 1924 Tailteann Games". Modernism, Drama, and the Audience for Irish Spectacle. Cambridge University Press. pp. 156–198. ISBN 9780521872997.
- Rouse, Paul (2015). "Sport on a Partitioned Island 1920 to the New Millennium". Sport and Ireland: A History. Oxford University Press. pp. 243–328. ISBN 9780198745907.
