= 1926 International Cross Country Championships =

- Organisers: ICCU
- Edition: 19th
- Date: March 28
- Host city: Brussels, Belgium
- Venue: Hippodrome de Stockel
- Events: 1
- Distances: 9 mi (14.5 km)
- Participation: 53 athletes from 6 nations

The 1926 International Cross Country Championships was held in Woluwe-Saint-Pierre, Brussels, Belgium, at the Hippodrome de Stockel on March 28, 1926. A report on the event was given in the Glasgow Herald.

Complete results, medalists, and the results of British athletes were published.

== Medalists ==
Event	Gold		Silver		Bronze	
Individual
Men; 9 mi (14.5 km)	Ernie Harper; England	44:17.4	Joseph Guillemot; France	44:59	Robert Marchal; France	45:04
Team
Men	France	32	England	62	Scotland	101

== Individual Race Results ==
=== Men's (9 mi / 14.5 km) ===
Rank	Athlete	Nationality	Time
1st place, gold medalist(s)	Ernie Harper	England	44:17.4
2nd place, silver medalist(s)	Joseph Guillemot	France	44:59
3rd place, bronze medalist(s)	Robert Marchal	France	45:04
4	Lucien Dolquès	France	45:06
5	James Mitchell	Scotland	45:10
6	Emile Chapuis	France	
7	Albert Rodway	England	45:12
8	Maurice Norland	France	
9	Léon Thierré	France	
10	Arthur Muggridge	England	45:32
11	Ernest Bedel	France	
12	Bill Cotterell	England	
13	Dunky Wright	Scotland	45:48
14	Austin Price	England	
15	Paul Bontemps	France	
16	Frank Stevenson	Scotland	45:58
17	Leon Degrande	Belgium	46:00
18	Tommy Metcalf	England	
19	John Ryan	Ireland	46:15
20	B.D. Hammond	Wales	46:17
21	Dan Quinn	Scotland	
22	Robert Miller	Scotland	
23	George Perry	England	
24	Charles Freshwater	Scotland	
25	Sam Ferris	Ireland	
26	Joseph Marien	Belgium	
27	Tom Whitton	Scotland	
28	E.R. Leyshon	Wales	
29	Ernie Thomas	Wales	
30	Alick Pirie	Scotland	
31	R. Moore	Ireland	
32	Jozef Langenus	Belgium	
33	Pierre Verbiest	Belgium	
34	Tommy Keating	Ireland	
35	Sammy Allnutt	England	
36	Jimmy Guy	Wales	
37	Ted Hopkins	Wales	
38	Ivor Thomas	Wales	
39	Georges Leclerc	France	
40	Patrick Groarke	Ireland	
41	Pierre Debraye	Belgium	
42	W. Atherton	England	
43	Kenneth Coard	Ireland	
44	George Walker	Ireland	
45	Danny Phillips	Wales	
46	Gwyn Morgan	Wales	
47	Jean Godefroid	Belgium	
—	Walter Calderwood	Scotland	DNF
—	Alex Gilmore	Ireland	DNF
—	Jack Prosser	Wales	DNF
—	Emile Goetleven	Belgium	DNF
—	Jean Corbloem	Belgium	DNF
—	Alfred De Fleurquin	Belgium	DNF

== Team Results ==
=== Men's ===
Rank	Country	Team	Points
1	France	Joseph Guillemot; Robert Marchal; Lucien Dolquès; Emile Chapuis; Maurice Norland; Léon Thierré	32
2	England	Ernie Harper; Albert Rodway; Arthur Muggridge; Bill Cotterell; Austin Price; Tommy Metcalf	62
3	Scotland	James Mitchell; Dunky Wright; Frank Stevenson; Dan Quinn; Robert Miller; Charles Freshwater	101
4	Wales	B.D. Hammond; E.R. Leyshon; Ernie Thomas; Jimmy Guy; Ted Hopkins; Ivor Thomas	188
5	Ireland	John Ryan; Sam Ferris; R. Moore; Tommy Keating; Patrick Groarke; Kenneth Coard	192
6	Belgium	Leon Degrande; Joseph Marien; Jozef Langenus; Pierre Verbiest; Pierre Debraye; Jean Godefroid	196

== Participation ==
An unofficial count yields the participation of 53 athletes from 6 countries.

- Belgium (9)
- England (9)
- France (9)
- Ireland (8)
- Scotland (9)
- Wales (9)

== See also ==
- 1926 in athletics (track and field)
