= 1922 International Cross Country Championships =

- Organisers: ICCU
- Edition: 15th
- Date: 1 April
- Host city: Glasgow, Scotland
- Venue: Hampden Park
- Events: 1
- Distances: 10 mi (16.1 km)
- Participation: 45 athletes from 5 nations

The 1922 International Cross Country Championships was held in Glasgow, Scotland, at the Hampden Park on 1 April 1922. A report on the event was given in the Glasgow Herald.

Complete results, medalists, and the results of British athletes were published.

== Medalists ==
Event	Gold		Silver		Bronze	
Individual
Men (10 mi 16.1 km)	Joseph Guillemot; France	1:03:59	Bill Cotterell; England	1:04:27	Julien Schnellmann; France	1:05:03
Team
Men	France	53	England	65	Scotland	90

== Individual Race Results ==
=== Men's (10 mi / 16.1 km) ===
Rank	Athlete	Nationality	Time
1st place, gold medalist(s)	Joseph Guillemot	France	1:03:59
2nd place, silver medalist(s)	Bill Cotterell	England	1:04:27
3rd place, bronze medalist(s)	Julien Schnellmann	France	1:05:03
4	George Wallach	Scotland	1:05:30
5	Ernie Thomas	Wales	1:05:43
6	Gaston Heuet	France	1:06:01
7	Joe Blewitt	England	1:06:06
8	Jean-Baptiste Manhès	France	1:06:09
9	Henry Bowler	England	1:06:14
10	Archie Craig Sr.	Scotland	1:06:15
11	Dunky Wright	Scotland	1:06:15
12	Harry Payne	England	1:06:24
13	Louis Corlet	France	1:06:25
14	Jim Edwards	Wales	1:06:39
15	J. Shaddick	England	1:06:42
16	David Richards Sen.	Wales	1:06:52
17	W. Kinsella	Ireland	1:07:04
18	Walter Calderwood	Scotland	1:06:06
19	Tommy Dougherty	Ireland	1:07:13
20	Jack Beman	England	1:07:25
21	John Cuthbert	Scotland	1:07:30
22	Emile Gaudé	France	1:07:34
23	T. Ferridge	Ireland	1:07:35
24	Alec Woods	Ireland	1:07:44
25	Maurice Herminier	France	1:07:55
26	James Riach	Scotland	1:08:05
27	Alex Barrie	Scotland	1:08:15
28	Edgar Davies	Wales	1:08:27
29	Alex Whitelaw	Scotland	1:08:28
30	Larry Cummins	Ireland	1:08:33
31	Harry Eckersley	England	1:09:03
32	Louis Bouchard	France	1:09:10
33	Frederick Ward	England	1:09:17
34	Amédée Isola	France	1:09:21
35	Danny Phillips	Wales	1:09:34
36	G. Bulleyment	England	1:09:40
37	W.J. Gowdy	Ireland	1:09:43
38	J. McBride	Ireland	1:09:46
39	Gwyn Morgan	Wales	1:09:47
40	Trevor Webber	Wales	1:10:00
41	Harry McCann	Ireland	1:10:10
—	J.H. Brunning	Wales	DNF
—	Austin Macauley	Ireland	DNF
—	Robert McMillan	Scotland	DNF
—	F. Richards	Wales	DNF

== Team Results ==
=== Men's ===
Rank	Country	Team	Points
1	France	Joseph Guillemot; Julien Schnellmann; Gaston Heuet; Jean-Baptiste Manhès; Louis Corlet; Emile Gaudé	53
2	England	Bill Cotterell; Joe Blewitt; Henry Bowler; Harry Payne; J. Shaddick; Jack Beman	65
3	Scotland	George Wallach; Archie Craig Sr. Dunky Wright; Walter Calderwood; John Cuthbert; James Riach	90
4	Wales	Ernie Thomas; Jim Edwards; David Richards Sen. Edgar Davies; Danny Phillips; Gwyn Morgan	137
5	Ireland	W. Kinsella; Tommy Dougherty; T. Ferridge; Alec Woods; Larry Cummins; W.J. Gowdy	150

== Participation ==
An unofficial count yields the participation of 45 athletes from 5 countries.

- England (9)
- France (9)
- Ireland (9)
- Scotland (9)
- Wales (9)

== See also ==
- 1922 in athletics (track and field)
