= 1924 International Cross Country Championships =

- Organisers: ICCU
- Edition: 17th
- Date: 22 March
- Host city: Newcastle-on-Tyne, Northumberland, England
- Venue: Gosforth Park
- Events: 1
- Distances: 10 mi (16.1 km)
- Participation: 52 athletes from 6 nations

The 1924 International Cross Country Championships was held in Newcastle-on-Tyne, England, at Gosforth Park on 22 March 1924. A report on the event was given in the Glasgow Herald.

Complete results, medallists, and the results of British athletes were published.

== Medallists ==
Event	Gold		Silver		Bronze	
Individual
Men; 10 mi (16.1 km)	Bill Cotterell; England	55:35.4	Ernie Harper; England	55:40	Eddie Webster; England	56:21
Team
Men	England	21	France	80	Scotland	133

== Individual Race Results ==
=== Men's (10 mi / 16.1 km) ===
Rank	Athlete	Nationality	Time
1st place, gold medalist(s)	Bill Cotterell	England	55:35.4
2nd place, silver medalist(s)	Ernie Harper	England	55:40
3rd place, bronze medalist(s)	Eddie Webster	England	56:21
4	Joe Blewitt	England	56:33
5	Joseph Williams	England	56:38
6	Ralph Stanton	England	56:45
7	Julien Schnellmann	France	56:51
8	Gaston Heuet	France	56:58
9	Arthur Sewell	England	57:09
10	Jean-Baptiste Manhès	France	57:11
11	Ernie Thomas	Wales	57:13
12	David Richards Sen.	Wales	57:29
13	John Cecil Benham	England	57:31
14	Robert Marchal	France	57:35
15	Camiel Van de Velde	Belgium	57:37
16	Archie Craig Sr.	Scotland	57:39
17	James G. McIntyre	Scotland	57:47
18	Dunky Wright	Scotland	57:52
19	Jim Wilson	Scotland	57:57
20	Emile Gaudé	France	58:07
21	Ernest Bedel	France	58:10
22	D. Healy	Ireland	58:10
23	George Wallach	Scotland	58:13
24	Félicien Van De Putte	Belgium	58:14
25	B.D. Hammond	Wales	58:18
26	Marcel Denis	France	58:23
27	John Martin	Ireland	58:26
28	Maurice Norland	France	58:45
29	George Magan	Ireland	58:48
30	Harry Clarke	England	58:55
31	W. McFerran	Ireland	58:57
32	E.R. Leyshon	Wales	59:21
33	Alec Gilmore	Ireland	59:30
34	Yves Cattelaine	Belgium	59:36
35	Pierre de Rom	Belgium	59:38
36	Leon Degrande	Belgium	59:39
37	Georges Bertrand	Belgium	1:00:00
38	J. Manning	Ireland	1:00:01
39	Jimmy Guy	Wales	1:00:35
40	Robert McIntyre	Scotland	1:00:37
41	Harry Russell	Ireland	1:02:15
42	Julien Van Campenhout	Belgium	1:02:45
43	Frantz Donat	France	1:02:50
44	Danny Phillips	Wales	1:02:51
45	Emile Hanneuse	Belgium	1:04:51
46	J. Cox	Wales	1:05:03
47	T. Glancy	Scotland	1:07:21
48	A.W. Johnson	Wales	1:08:12
—	J. Corcoran	Ireland	DNF
—	John Ryan	Ireland	DNF
—	Charles Freshwater	Scotland	DNF
—	James McIntyre	Scotland	DNF

== Team Results ==
=== Men's ===
Rank	Country	Team	Points
1	England	Bill Cotterell; Ernie Harper; Eddie Webster; Joe Blewitt; Joseph Williams; Ralph Stanton	21
2	France	Julien Schnellmann; Gaston Heuet; Jean-Baptiste Manhès; Robert Marchal; Emile Gaudé; Ernest Bedel	80
3	Scotland	Archie Craig Sr. James G. McIntyre; Dunky Wright; Jim Wilson; George Wallach; Robert McIntyre	133
4	Wales	Ernie Thomas; David Richards Sen. B.D. Hammond; E.R. Leyshon; Jimmy Guy; Danny Phillips	163
5	Ireland	D. Healy; John Martin; George Magan; W. McFerran; A. Gilmore; J. Manning	180
6	Belgium	Camiel Van de Velde; Félicien Van De Putte; Yves Cattelaine; Pierre De Rom; Leon Degrande; Georges Bertrand	181

== Participation ==
An unofficial count yields the participation of 52 athletes from 6 countries.

- Belgium (8)
- England (9)
- France (9)
- Ireland (9)
- Scotland (9)
- Wales (8)

== See also ==
- 1924 in athletics (track and field)
