= Lucien Duquesne =

French athlete (1900–1991)

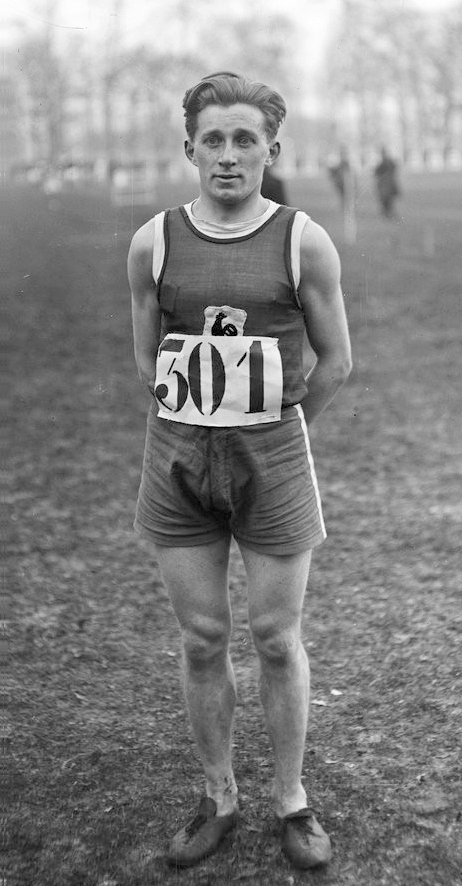
- Lucien Duquesne in 1921

Personal information
- Born: 17 October 1900 Maromme, France
- Died: 7 May 1991 (aged 90)

Sport
- Sport: Athletics
- Event(s): 3000–10,000 m, steeplechase
- Club: FC Rouen; RC Arras; Amiens SC

Achievements and titles
- Personal best(s): 3000 m – 8:51.4 (1924); 5000 m – 15:07.6 (1926); 10,000 m – 33:23.8 (1926); 3000 mS – 9:40.6e (1928)
Medal record
Representing France
International Cross Country Championships
Bronze medal – third place	1920 Belfast	Team (7 ind)
Gold medal – first place	1923 Maisons-Laffitte	Team (7 ind)

Eléonor Lucien Ernest Duquesne (17 October 1900 – 7 May 1991) was a French runner who competed at three Olympic Games.

== Career ==
Duquesne competed in the 3000 metres – 10,000 metres events at the 1920, 1924 and 1928 Summer Olympics. His best achievements were fourth place in the team 3000 m event in 1920 and 1924 and sixth place in the 3000 m steeplechase in 1928.

In the first laps of the 1928 steeplechase semifinal, Paavo Nurmi fell at the water jump, and Duquesne stopped and helped him out. In return, Nurmi paced Duquesne through the rest of the race, thereby helping him to reach the final.

Duquesne competed at the International Cross Country Championships in 1920 and 1923, finishing seventh on both occasions and winning two medals with the French team. He finished third behind Albert Hill in the 1 mile event at the British 1921 AAA Championships. He returned in 1923 and finished second behind Joe Blewitt in the 4 miles event at the 1923 AAA Championships.
