= Athletics at the 1924 Summer Olympics – Men's 3000 metres steeplechase =

Men's 3000 metres steeplechase at the Games of the VIII Olympiad
- Venue: Stade Olympique Yves-du-Manoir
- Dates: July 7, 1924 (semifinals); July 9, 1924 (final)
- Competitors: 20 from 10 nations

Medalists
1st place, gold medalist(s)		Ville Ritola; Finland
2nd place, silver medalist(s)		Elias Katz; Finland
3rd place, bronze medalist(s)		Paul Bontemps; France

The men's 3000 metres steeplechase event was part of the track and field athletics programme at the 1924 Summer Olympics. The competition was held on Monday, July 7, 1924, and on Wednesday, July 9, 1924. As the official film of the Games shows, race was run on the infield of the 500M track, and each barrier was formed of a different kind of fencing, including a deep water jump and a sloped picket fence. Twenty runners from ten nations competed.

== Records ==
These were the standing world and Olympic records (in minutes) prior to the 1924 Summer Olympics.

World record	9:33.4(*)	(France) Paul Bontemps	Paris (FRA)	June 9, 1924
Olympic record	10:00.4	(United Kingdom) Percy Hodge	Antwerp (BEL)	August 20, 1920

(*) unofficial

In the first run Elias Katz set a new Olympic record with 9:43.8 minutes. In the final Ville Ritola improved the record with 9:33.6 minutes.

== Results ==
=== Semifinals ===
All semi-finals were held on Monday, July 7, 1924.

The best three finishers of every heat qualified for the final.

Semifinal 1

Place	Athlete	Time	Qual.
1	Elias Katz (FIN)	9:43.8	Q OR
2	Paul Bontemps (FRA)	9:47.2	Q
3	Evelyn Montague (GBR)	9:48.0	Q
4	Nestori Järvelä (FIN)		
5	Russell Payne (USA)		
6	Georges Leclerc (FRA)	10:20.0	
7	Antenore Negri (ITA)		

Semifinal 2

Place	Athlete	Time	Qual.
1	Amédée Isola (FRA)	9:57.8	Q
2	Michael Devaney (USA)		Q
3	Kalle Ebb (FIN)		Q
4	Ernesto Ambrosini (ITA)		
5	David Cummings (GBR)		
6	Len Richardson (RSA)		
7	Jim Kelly (IRL)		
8	Jan Zeegers (NED)		

Semifinal 3

Place	Athlete	Time	Qual.
1	Ville Ritola (FIN)	9:59.0	Q
2	Marvin Rick (USA)	10:11.0	Q
3	Sidney Newey (GBR)		Q
4	Maurice Deconninck (FRA)	10:19.0	
5	Stanisław Ziffer (POL)	10:38.4	

=== Final ===
The final was held on Wednesday, July 9, 1924.

Place	Athlete	Time
1	Ville Ritola (FIN)	9:33.6 OR
2	Elias Katz (FIN)	9:44.0
3	Paul Bontemps (FRA)	9:45.2
4	Marvin Rick (USA)	9:56.4
5	Kalle Ebb (FIN)	9:57.5
6	Evelyn Montague (GBR)	9:58.0
7	Michael Devaney (USA)	10:01.0
8	Amédée Isola (FRA)	10:14.8
9	Sidney Newey (GBR)	
