= David Cummings (athlete) =

British athlete

Personal information
- Nationality: British (Scottish)
- Born: 7 May 1894 Kilbarchan, Scotland
- Died: 21 January 1987 (aged 92) Paisley, Scotland

Sport
- Sport: Athletics
- Event: 3000 metres steeplechase
- Club: Greenrock Glenpark Harriers

David Cummings (7 May 1894 – 21 January 1987) was a British athlete who competed at the 1924 Summer Olympics.

== Career ==
Cummings finished third behind Joe Blewitt in the steeplechase event at the 1924 AAA Championships. Shortly afterwards he was selected for the British team at the 1924 Olympic Games in Paris but was eliminated in the semi-finals of the steeplechase event.
