= 1925 International Cross Country Championships =

- Organisers: ICCU
- Edition: 18th
- Date: March 28
- Host city: Dublin, Ireland (Republic of Ireland)
- Venue: Baldoyle Racecourse
- Events: 1
- Distances: 10 mi (16.1 km)
- Participation: 42 athletes from 5 nations

The 1925 International Cross Country Championships was held in Dublin, Ireland, at the Baldoyle Racecourse on March 28, 1925. A report on the event was given in the Glasgow Herald.

Complete results, medalists, and the results of British athletes were published.

== Medalists ==
Event	Gold		Silver		Bronze	
Individual
Men; 10 mi (16.1 km)	Eddie Webster; England	56:55	John Ryan; Ireland	57:14	Bill Cotterell; England	57:38
Team
Men	England	29	Ireland	91	Wales	92

== Individual Race Results ==
=== Men's (10 mi / 16.1 km) ===
Rank	Athlete	Nationality	Time
1st place, gold medalist(s)	Eddie Webster	England	56:55
2nd place, silver medalist(s)	John Ryan	Ireland	57:14
3rd place, bronze medalist(s)	Bill Cotterell	England	57:38
4	Sammy Allnutt	England	57:39
5	Dunky Wright	Scotland	57:40
6	Ernie Harper	England	57:52
7	Austin Price	England	58:02
8	Albert Rodway	England	58:19
9	David Richards Sen.	Wales	59:00
10	Henry Bowler	England	59:07
11	Ernie Thomas	Wales	59:10
12	George Magan	Ireland	59:20
13	E.R. Leyshon	Wales	59:45
14	Jim Wilson	Scotland	59:51
15	W.W.T. Ahearne	Ireland	59:55
16	James Mitchell	Scotland	59:56
17	B.D. Hammond	Wales	59:59
18	Bevy Bingham	Ireland	59:59
19	Tom Whitton	Scotland	1:00:10
20	J.H. Brunning	Wales	1:00:12
21	Sam Ferris	Ireland	1:00:18
22	J. Stainer	Wales	1:00:21
23	George Walker	Ireland	1:00:32
24	Cyril Walker	Ireland	1:00:38
25	Harry Eckersley	England	1:00:49
26	W.N. Neilson	Scotland	1:00:53
27	Alex McMorran	Scotland	1:01:04
28	Robert Miller	Scotland	1:01:21
29	William Nelson	England	1:01:26
30	Robert McIntyre	Scotland	1:01:27
31	Paul van Steenlandt	Belgium	1:02:02
32	Georges Bertrand	Belgium	1:02:05
33	R. Morgan	Wales	1:02:07
34	Louis de Lathouwer	Belgium	1:02:35
35	Dougie Coard	Ireland	1:03:15
36	James McIntyre	Scotland	1:03:27
37	Kenneth Coard	Ireland	
38	Georges De Braye	Belgium	
39	Jean Corbloem	Belgium	
40	Jim Edwards	Wales	
41	D. Evans	Wales	
42	Lucien Bontinck	Belgium	

== Team Results ==
=== Men's ===
Rank	Country	Team	Points
1	England	Eddie Webster; Bill Cotterell; Sammy Allnutt; Ernie Harper; Austin Price; Albert Rodway	29
2	Ireland	John Ryan; George Magan; W.W.T. Ahearne; Bevy Bingham; Sam Ferris; George Walker	91
3	Wales	David Richards Sen. Ernie Thomas; E.R. Leyshon; B.D. Hammond; J.H. Brunning; J. Stainer	92
4	Scotland	Dunky Wright; Jim Wilson; James Mitchell; Tom Whitton; W.N. Neilson; Alex McMorran	107
5	Belgium	Paul van Steenlandt; Georges Bertrand; Louis de Lathouwer; Georges De Braye; Jean Corbloem; Lucien Bontinck	216

== Participation ==
An unofficial count yields the participation of 42 athletes from 5 countries.

- Belgium (6)
- England (9)
- Ireland (9)
- Scotland (9)
- Wales (9)

== See also ==
- 1925 in athletics (track and field)
