= Maryhill Harriers =

Scottish athletics club

- Founded: October 1888
- Ground: John Paul Academy
- Location: 2 Arrochar Street, Glasgow G23 5LY
- Coordinates: 55.904043°N 4.296405°W
- Website: official website

Maryhill Harriers is a Scottish athletics club based in Glasgow, Scotland and is affiliated to Scottish Athletics. The club is based at John Paul Academy, with training held on Tuesdays and Thursdays.

== History ==
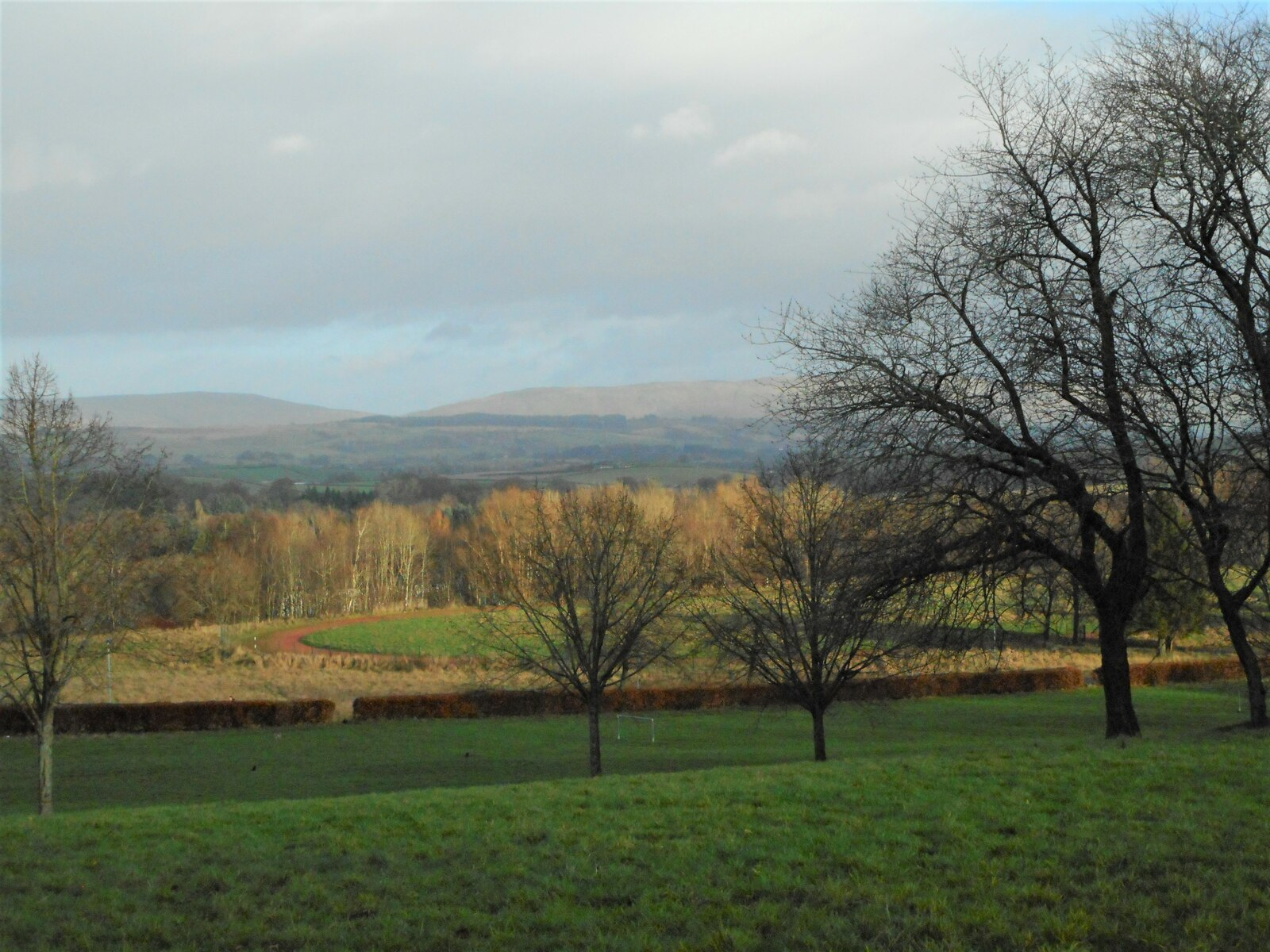
The Caldercuilt Recreation Ground with the track in the background

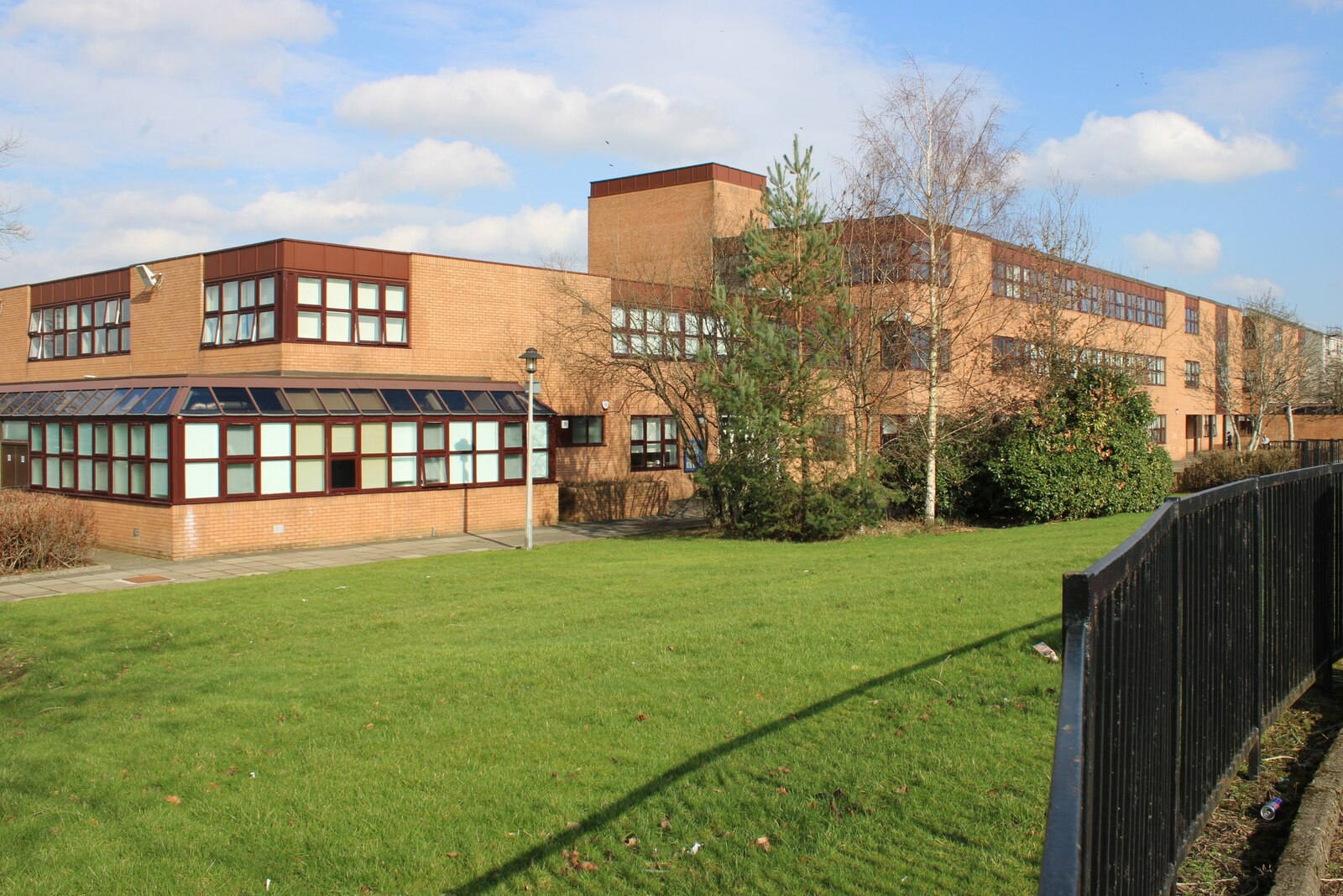
John Paul Academy

The club was founded in 1888 and early annual championships were held at Kelvinvale Park in Maryhill.

The club had two Olympians at the 1936 Summer Olympics in Berlin, they were Bobby Graham and Donald Robertson.

== Notable athletes ==
=== Olympians ===
Athlete	Events	Games	Medals/Ref
Bobby Graham	1,500m	1936	
Donald Robertson	marathon	1936	

- Scottish unless stated

=== Commonwealth Games ===
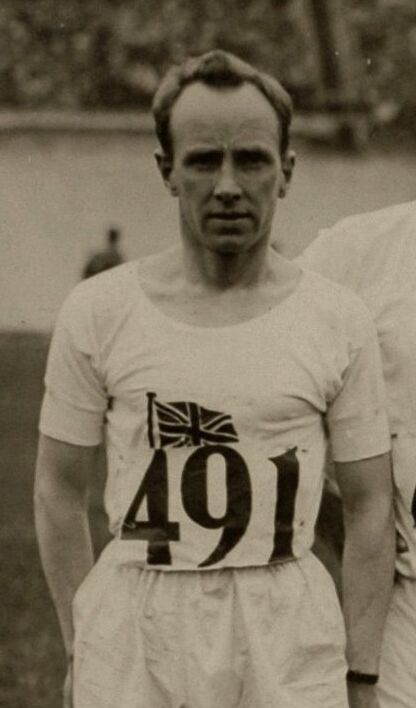
Dunky Wright

Athlete	Events	Games	Medals/Ref
Dunky Wright	marathon	1930, 1934	,
Bobby Graham	880y, 1/3 mile/s	1934, 1938	
Donald Robertson	marathon	1934, 1938	Silver medal
Archie Turner	100y, 220y, 4×110y relay	1934	Bronze medal
Moira Campbell	100y, 220y, 4×110 relay	1958	
Alix Jamieson	100y, 220y, high jump	1958	
