= John Cuthbert =

John Cuthbert may refer to:

- John Cuthbert (Royal Navy officer) (1902–1987), British admiral
- John Cuthbert (athlete) (1894–1960), Canadian athlete
- John Alfred Cuthbert (1788–1881), American politician

== See also ==
- Jack Cuthbert, rugby player
