= Robert Marchal =

French long-distance runner

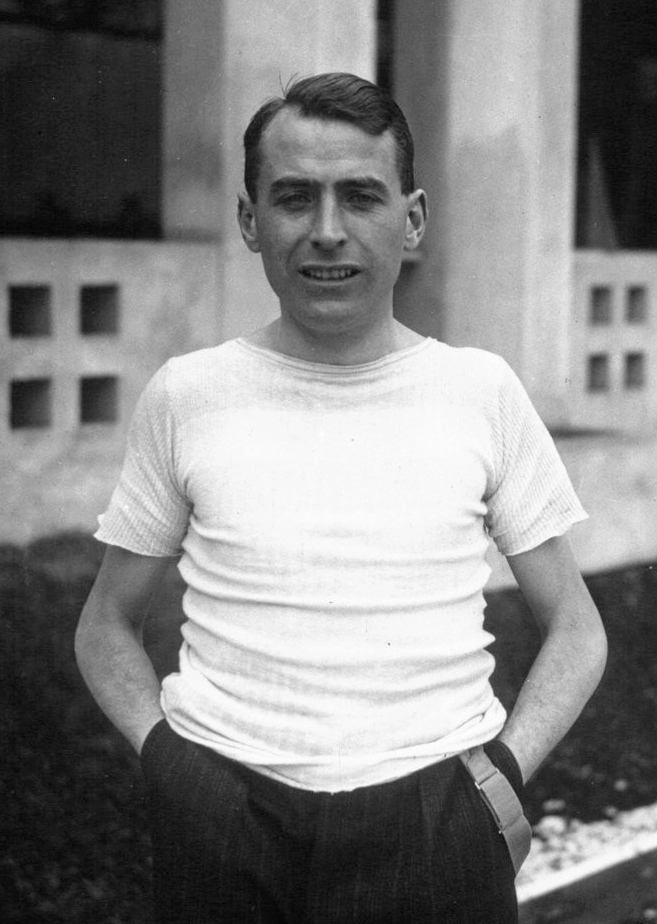
- Robert Marchal in 1931

Personal information
- Born: 10 November 1901 Tournan-en-Brie, France
- Died: 15 July 1961 (aged 59)
- Height: 160 cm (5 ft 3 in)
- Weight: 60 kg (132 lb)

Sport
- Sport: Athletics
- Event(s): 5000 m, 10,000 m
- Club: Olympique de Paris; Red Star Paris

Achievements and titles
- Personal best(s): 5000 m – 15:06.8 (1926); 10,000 m – 31:59.4 (1925)
Medal record
Representing France
International Cross Country Championships
Silver medal – second place	1924 Newcastle-on-Tyne	Team
Gold medal – first place	1926 Brussels	Team
Bronze medal – third place	1926 Brussels	Individual
Gold medal – first place	1929 Vincennes	Team

Robert Henri Marchal (10 November 1901 – 15 July 1961) was a French long-distance runner. He competed in the 10,000 m event at the 1924 and 1928 Summer Olympics and finished 9th and 11th, respectively. In 1924 he was also a non-scoring member of the French 3000 m team that won the bronze medal.

Marchal was also a member of French teams that twice won the International Cross Country Championships between 1924 and 1929. Individually he finished third in 1926 and fourth in 1929.
