= Joseph Guillemot =

Early 20th century French runner

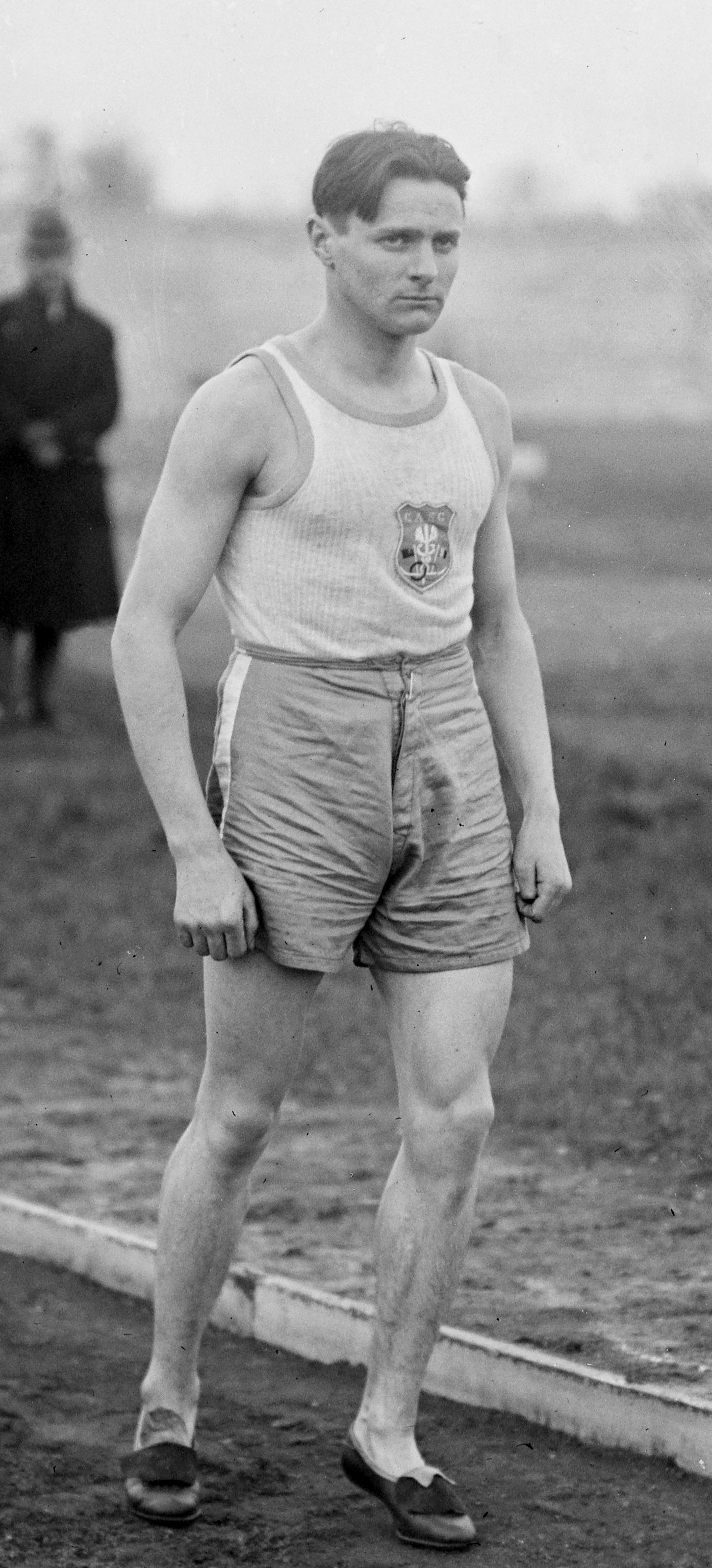
- Joseph Guillemot in 1920

Personal information
- Born: 1 October 1899 Le Dorat, France
- Died: 9 March 1975 (aged 75) Paris, France
- Height: 1.60 m (5 ft 3 in)
- Weight: 55 kg (121 lb)

Sport
- Sport: Athletics
- Event: 1500–10,000 m
- Club: CASG Paris

Achievements and titles
- Personal bests: 1500 m – 4:02.4 (1920); 5000 m – 14:55.6 (1920); 10,000 m – 31:47.2 (1920)
Medal record
Men's athletics
Representing France
Olympic Games
Gold medal – first place	1920 Antwerp	5000 metres
Silver medal – second place	1920 Antwerp	10,000 metres
International Cross Country Championships
Gold medal – first place	1922 Glasgow	Team
Gold medal – first place	1922 Glasgow	Individual
Gold medal – first place	1926 Brussels	Team
Silver medal – second place	1926 Brussels	Individual

Joseph Guillemot (French: [ʒozɛf ɡijmo]; 1 October 1899 – 9 March 1975) was a French middle- and long-distance runner. He won the 5000 metres and was second in the 10,000 metres at the 1920 Summer Olympics.

== Career ==
Guillemot's athletics career began while he was serving in World War I. During the war he won the national cross-country championships of the French military. He then returned to the front and fought until the Armistice on 11 November 1918.

During World War I, Guillemot was the victim of an accident that left his right lung permanently damaged by mustard gas. In addition, his heart was located on the right-hand side of his chest. Nevertheless, Guillemot went on to have a successful career in athletics.

In 1920 Guillemot won the French national championship in the 5000 m, which qualified him for the Olympic Games in Antwerp later that year. The favourite for the 5000 m in Antwerp was Paavo Nurmi. In the final of the 5000 m, Nurmi ran at a high pace in the first half of the race as a strategy to exhaust the Swedes Eric Backman and Rudolf Falk. Only Guillemot was able to follow Nurmi's pace. Guillemot passed Nurmi on the last bend to take the victory.

Guillemot then took the silver medal in the 10,000 m behind Nurmi. The final of the 10,000 m was brought forward by three hours at the request of King Albert of Belgium, which Guillemot was only informed of after eating a large lunch. Suffering from stomach cramps and wearing shoes that were two sizes too large (as his own shoes had been stolen), Guillemot finished 1.4 seconds behind Nurmi in second place.

After the 1920 Olympics, Guillemot won three titles in the International Cross Country Championships: one individual title in 1922 and two with the French team in 1922 and 1926. He won the French 5000 m title on three occasions, but missed the 1924 Olympics due to disagreements with the French Athletics Union.

== World records ==
Guillemot held two world records: 2000 m (5:34.8) and 3000 m (8:42.2).

== Death ==
Having been a pack a day cigarette smoker, Guillemot died of lung cancer in Oradour-Saint-Genest at the age of 75.
