= Nestori Järvelä =

Finnish middle-distance runner

Personal information
- Nationality: Finnish
- Born: 18 April 1893
- Died: 21 January 1951 (aged 57)

Sport
- Sport: Middle-distance running
- Event: Steeplechase

Nestori Järvelä (18 April 1893 – 21 January 1951) was a Finnish middle-distance runner. He competed in the men's 3000 metres steeplechase at the 1924 Summer Olympics.
