= Elias Katz =

Athletics competitor

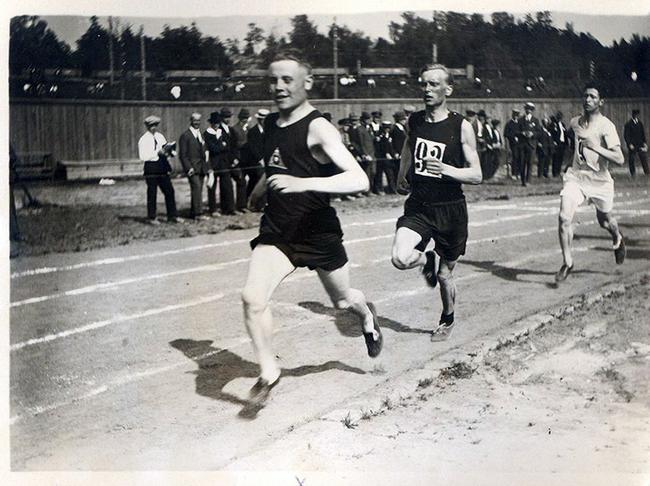
- Katz (right) behind Paavo Nurmi and Oskari Rissanen in 1920

Medal record

Men's athletics

Representing Finland

Olympic Games
| Gold medal – first place | 1924 Paris | 3000 metre team |
| Silver medal – second place | 1924 Paris | 3000 metre steeplechase |

Elias Katz (22 June 1901 – 26 December 1947) was a Finnish track and field athlete, who competed mainly in the 3000 metres steeplechase in the 1920s. In 1933, he immigrated to Mandatory Palestine, where he lived for the rest of his life.

== Biography ==
Katz was born in Turku to a Jewish family. He frequented local nightclubs, participated in dance marathons, and played soccer with the small Jewish sports club in Turku. While an amateur athlete, he worked as a shop assistant. When he was 18, Katz was invited to participate in a mid-distance race. After defeating the reigning champion, it was suggested to him to become a professional athlete. He began training in the main sports club of Turku, where he befriended the legendary Finnish runner Paavo Nurmi, who helped Katz improve his technique. He moved to Helsinki in 1921, where he joined the Jewish sports club Stjärnan, later Makkabi Helsinki. He ran two distances in the Finland-France competition in 1923 and became a candidate for the Finnish Olympic team.

Katz competed for Finland in the 1924 Summer Olympics held in Paris, France in the 3000-meter steeple chase where he won the silver medal. He then joined with Paavo Nurmi and Ville Ritola to win the gold medal in the 3,000-meter team race as well.

In 1925, Katz moved to Berlin, Germany, where he joined the Bar Kokhba Jewish sports club. He worked at the KWD department store in Berlin to support himself. In 1926, he was part of the Finnish four-member team that set the world record in the 1,500-meter relay race. An ankle injury prevented him from participating in the 1928 Summer Olympics in Amsterdam, and he worked as a trainer in the Bar Kokhba club until the Nazis came to power in Germany and banned Jews from participating in sport activities. Rather than return to Finland, Katz immigrated to Mandatory Palestine in 1933 along with many other fellow Bar Kokhba club members. There, he changed his name to Eliyahu and coached athletes of the Maccabi Association. Katz was coach of the Palestinian track team for the 1948 Maccabi Games. His coaching was on a voluntary basis in his spare time - he had hoped to find employment as a trainer, but was unpaid for his work and struggled to make a living. He worked as a guard and maintenance man at the Maccabiah Stadium in Tel Aviv, a bricklayer on construction sites, and a traveling film projectionist for the British Army.

In 1936, Katz married Dvora Kamtsan, a fellow Finnish Jewish immigrant to Palestine, and they had one daughter, Ilana, who was born in 1944.

In December 1947, as the Civil War in Mandatory Palestine was raging, Katz screened a film at a British military camp in the Gaza area. Later that evening, he was killed by Arab sniper fire.

== See also ==
- List of select Jewish track and field athletes
