= Amédée Isola =

French steeplechase runner

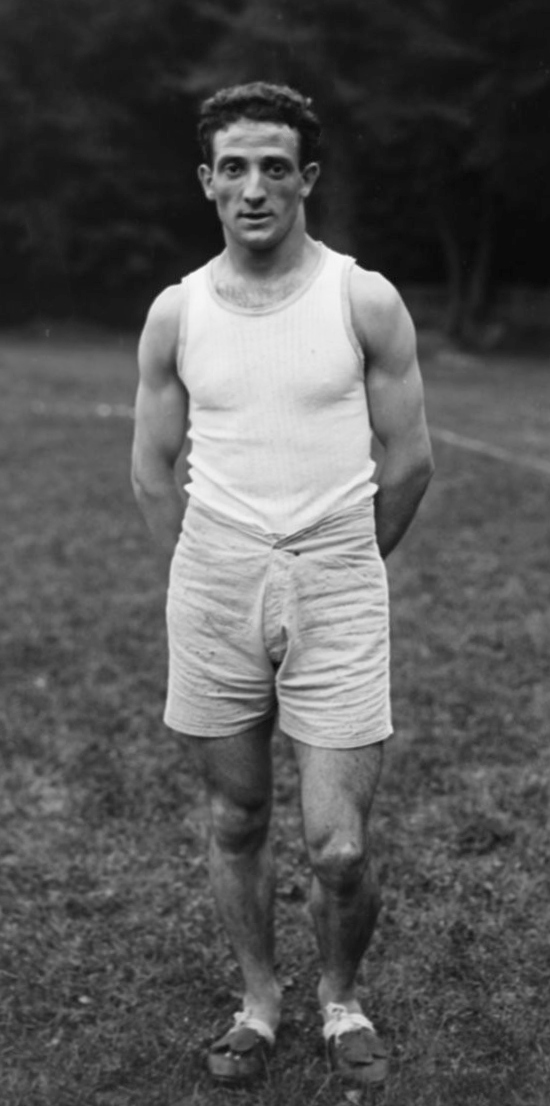
- Isola in 1922

Personal information
- Other names: Albert Isola
- Born: 10 July 1898
- Died: 15 January 1991 (aged 92)
- Height: 169 cm (5 ft 7 in)
- Weight: 66 kg (146 lb)

Sport
- Sport: Athletics
- Event: Steeplechase
- Club: CASG Paris

Achievements and titles
- Personal best: 3000 mS – 9:41.8 (1924)

Amédée Isola (10 July 1898 – 15 January 1991), also known as Albert Isola, was a French runner. He competed in the 3000 m steeplechase at the 1924 Summer Olympics and finished eighth. He was also a non-scoring member of the winning French team at the 1922 International Cross Country Championships.
