= Marvin Rick =

American middle-distance runner

Personal information
- Full name: Edwin Marvin Rick
- Nationality: American
- Born: January 31, 1901 Brooklyn, New York, U.S.
- Died: January 21, 1999 (aged 97)

Sport
- Sport: Middle-distance running
- Event: Steeplechase

Edwin Marvin Rick (January 31, 1901 – January 21, 1999) was an American middle-distance runner. He was educated at Erasmus Hall High School before attending Mercersburg Academy, where he trained under Scots American coach Jimmy Curran. He entered university at both Princeton and Massachusetts Institute of Technology. He went on to compete in the men's 3000 metres steeplechase at the 1924 Summer Olympics.
