= John Paul Academy =

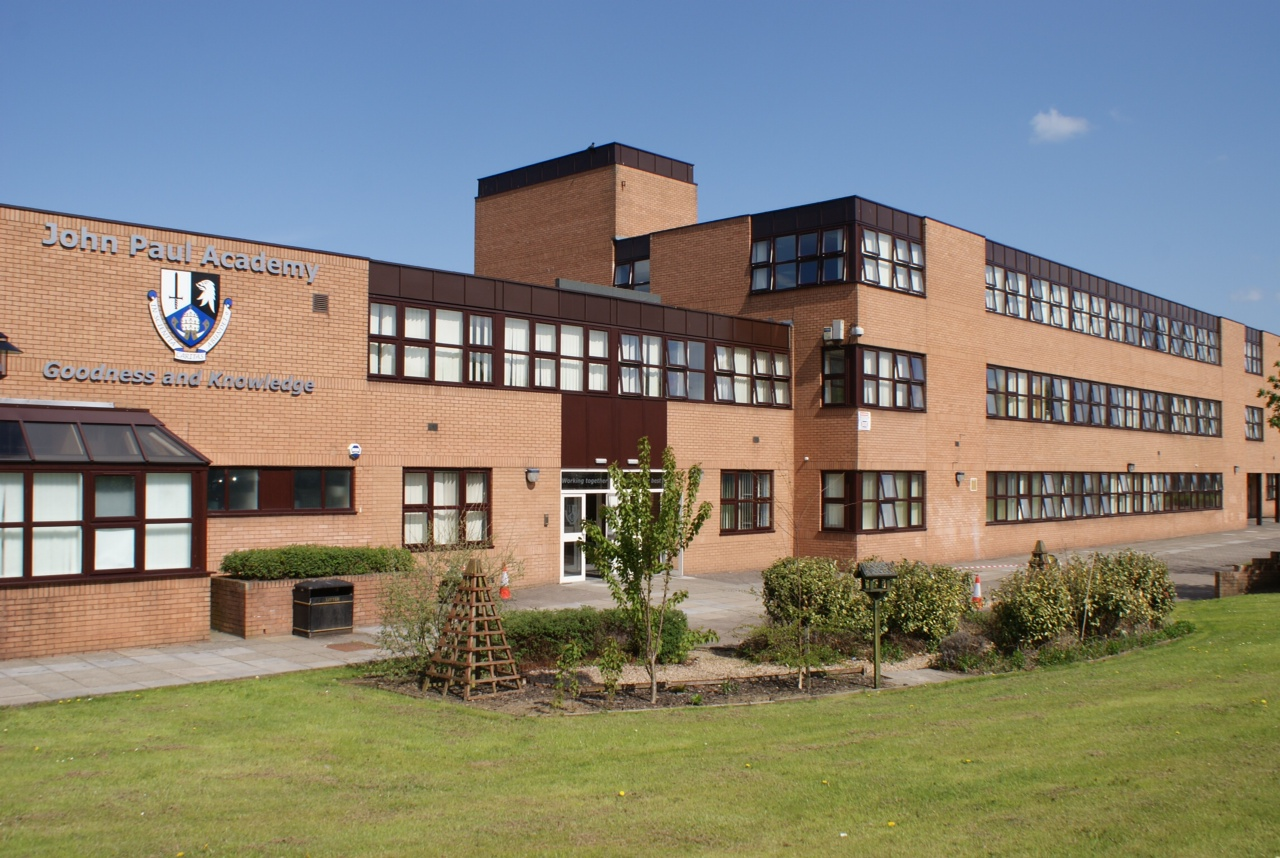

Location
- 2 Arrochar Street; Glasgow, G23 5LY; Scotland

Information
- Type: Secondary School
- Motto: Working Together To Achieve Our Best
- Religious affiliation: Roman Catholic
- Established: 1982
- Local authority: Glasgow City
- Headteacher: N/A
- School Chaplain: J Dean
- Staff: 51.4 FTE
- Gender: Mixed
- Enrolment: 919 (September 2018)

John Paul Academy, is a Roman Catholic secondary school in Summerston, Glasgow, Scotland. It mainly serves Summerston, Maryhill, Ruchill, Possilpark and Milton and has a capacity of 800–1000 pupils. The catchment area for the school changed after the 1990s; the areas of Ruchill, Possilpark and Milton were provided by St Augustine's Roman Catholic Secondary School within Milton area, and the children of Catholic families of Bearsden and Milngavie went to John Paul Academy.

Opened in 1982 by Strathclyde Regional Council, it is named after Pope John Paul II, who visited Glasgow and hosted an open-air mass in Bellahouston Park that year.

The School's motto In Scientia Caritas Abundet, "In Knowledge May Goodness Abound", can be found on the school crest. It consists of the Pope's Episcopal Mitre, The Eagle of Saint John and Saint Paul's sword.

The original headteacher was Eamon Rafferty, followed by Mary Weeple until 2007, by Charles Docherty until 2008/09, then by Vincent Docherty 2010/2014 then John McGhee 2014/2021 then finally Mr David Owen 2022/2026
