= Aimé Proot =

Belgian long-distance runner

Personal information
- Nationality: Belgian
- Born: 31 March 1890 Bruges, Belgium
- Died: 30 January 1959 (aged 68) Blankenberge, Belgium

Sport
- Sport: Long-distance running
- Event: 10,000 metres

Aimé Proot (31 March 1890 – 30 January 1959) was a Belgian long-distance runner. He competed in the men's 10,000 metres at the 1920 Summer Olympics.
