= Ernie Harper =

British athlete

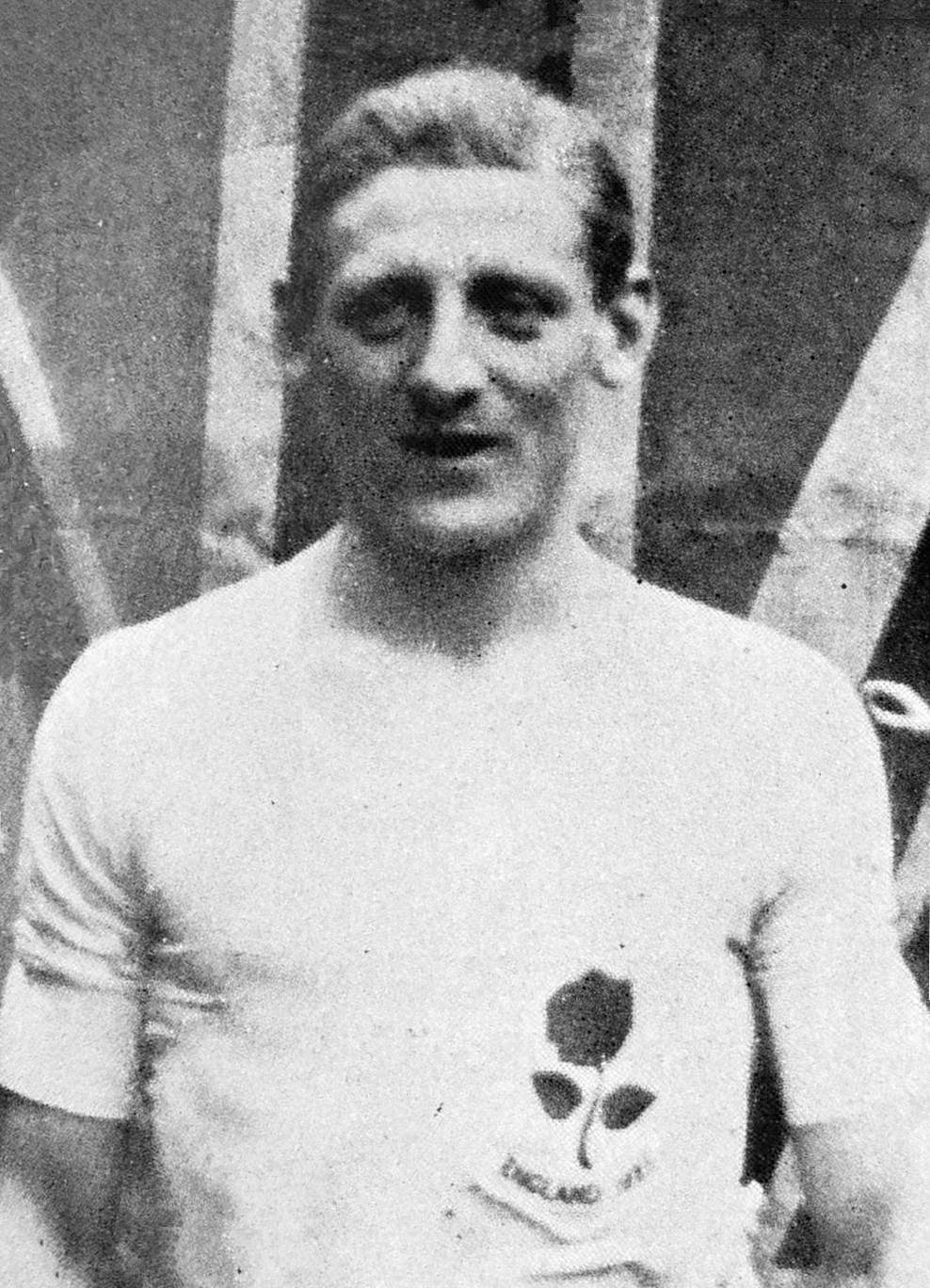

Personal information
- Born: 3 August 1902 Chesterfield, England
- Died: 9 October 1979 (aged 77) Tullamarine, Melbourne, Australia
- Height: 1.68 m (5 ft 6 in)
- Weight: 58 kg (128 lb)

Sport
- Sport: Athletics
- Event: 5,000 m – marathon
- Club: Hallamshire Harriers, Sheffield

Achievements and titles
- Personal bests: 5000 m – 15:35.0 (1926); 10,000 m – 31:58.0 (1924); Marathon – 2:31:23.2 (1936)
Medal record
Representing Great Britain
Olympic Games
Silver medal – second place	1936 Berlin	Marathon
Representing England
British Empire Games
Silver medal – second place	1930 Hamilton	6 miles
International Cross Country Championships
Gold medal – first place	1924 Newcastle-on-Tyne	Team
Silver medal – second place	1924 Newcastle-on-Tyne	Individual
Gold medal – first place	1925 Dublin	Team
Silver medal – second place	1926 Brussels	Team
Gold medal – first place	1926 Brussels	Individual
Silver medal – second place	1927 Caerleon	Team
Silver medal – second place	1928 Ayr	Team
Silver medal – second place	1929 Vincennes	Team
Gold medal – first place	1930 Leamington	Team

Ernest Harper (3 August 1902 – 9 October 1979) was an English athlete who competed for Great Britain in the 1924, 1928 and 1936 Summer Olympics.

== Career ==
Harper became the national 10 miles champion after winning the AAA Championships title at the 1923 AAA Championships.

At the 1924 Olympic Games, Harper finished fifth in the 10000 metre and fourth in the individual cross country event. He was the only British finisher in this race; therefore, the British team was unplaced in the team cross country competition. Just fifteen of the thirty-eight starters finished the event due to the extreme heat, The Times reporting the scenes at the end of the race:

"Some way behind Harper a figure in the scarlet drawers of Spain appeared in the entrance, turned the wrong way, was stopped, and then ran horribly round in little circles till he plunged on his face. Immediately another figure appeared, Sewell of the British team. He also tried to run the wrong way, was checked, and turned round, ran giddily a few yards, staggered, met another competitor, a Finn, also reeling, and the two fell together in a dreadful heap. Meanwhile a Frenchman had entered and ran three-quarters of the distance to the winning line, began to zig-zag, threw up his arms helplessly, and crashed full length on the ground. It was all heartbreaking to watch. Never, surely, in any race – not even in a Grand National – was there anything like the proportion of casualties; and the race ought never to have been run in the heat of such a day. It was altogether a terrible race. Harper’s performance was a fine one."

Harper regained his AAA Championships 10 miles title at the 1926 AAA Championships and won it again at the 1927 AAA Championships and 1929 AAA Championships.

In 1928 Harper finished 22nd in the Olympic marathon; he improved to second place at the 1936 Berlin Olympics. Harper earned praise for advising eventual winner Sohn Kee-chung not to chase after Juan Carlos Zabala, who had opened a big lead. Zabala eventually pulled out of the race. Sohn was later reported to have said: "Please say Mr Harper is a very fine man for telling me about Zabala."

At the 1930 British Empire Games in Hamilton, Canada, Harper won the silver medal in the six miles event.

Harper ran for Hallamshire Harriers and Athletic Club in Sheffield. His record in the national cross-country championships was: 3rd (1923), 2nd (1924), 2nd (1925 & 1926), 1st (1927), 14th (1928), 1st (1929) and 2nd (1930). In addition, he won numerous Yorkshire and Northern cross-country titles and represented England in International Cross Country Championships in 1923–1931, winning the individual competition in 1926.

Harper had a fine reputation for sportsmanship. As well as the 1936 marathon incident mentioned above, in a 1924 international cross-country race he waited for another competitor, as described in The Times:

[The collapse of Ryan], besides causing much excitement, left Harper with every prospect of coming in first. Instead of making the most of his opportunity, however, Harper turned and waved for Cotterell to come along. Cotterell came up with a bound, and the pair ran abreast until about twenty-five yards from the tape, when Cotterell made a great sprint, leaving Harper behind, and won a sensational race. Cotterell did fast running in the last two-and-a-half miles to make up the ground he did. Without discounting the excellence of his victory, however, credit must be given to Harper, a young runner who displayed considerable unselfishness. There is no means of knowing exactly how much [Cotterell] had in reserve at the finish, but it certainly seemed that Harper deliberately sacrificed his chance of being the first man home.

Apocryphal stories tell of him helping up competitors who had fallen, and re-directing someone who had taken a wrong turn on a cross-country course. More prosaically, he was once said to have vacated his seat on a full bus to allow another passenger to sit, instead running behind the vehicle all the way up the steep hill to his home.

In 1939 Harper turned professional. Around that time he lived with his married daughter, who settled in Australia.
