= Paul Bontemps =

French runner (1902–1981)

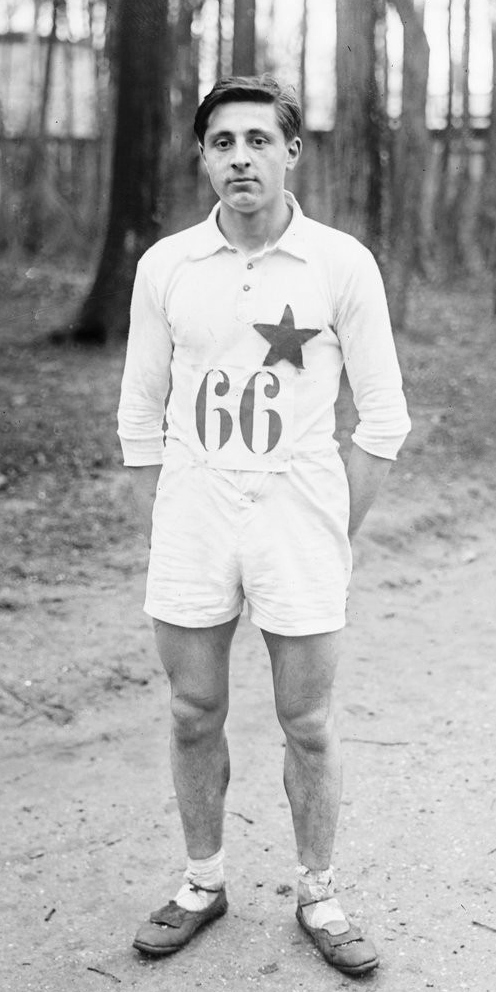
- Paul Bontemps in 1922

Personal information
- Born: 16 November 1902 Paris, France
- Died: 25 April 1981 (aged 78) Sèvres, France

Sport
- Sport: Athletics
- Event: 800–5000 m
- Club: Racing CF, Paris

Achievements and titles
- Personal bests: 800 m: 1.54.6 (1927); 1500 m: 3.59.8 (1925); Mile: 4.21.8 (1927); 3000 m: 8.50.2 (1924); 5000 m: 15.33.6 (1923); 3000 m steeplechase: 9.33.4 (1924)
Medal record
Representing France
Olympic Games
Bronze medal – third place	1924 Paris	3000 metre steeplechase

Paul Pierre Bontemps (16 November 1902 – 25 April 1981) was a French runner. He competed at the 1924 Paris Olympics in the 3,000 m steeplechase and in the flat 3,000 m team event, and finished in third and fourth place, respectively. He set an unofficial world record in the steeplechase a few weeks before the Games.
