= Gerard Steurs =

Belgian long-distance runner

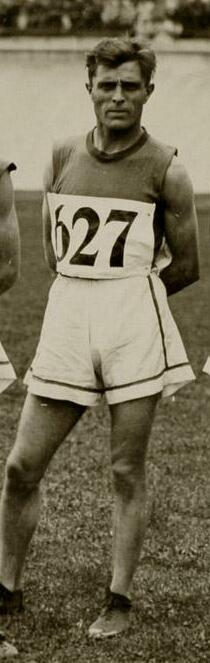
- Steurs at the 1928 Summer Olympics

Personal information
- Nationality: Belgian
- Born: Théophilus Gerardus Steurs; 13 June 1901
- Died: 7 June 1961 (aged 59)

Sport
- Sport: Long-distance running
- Event: Marathon

Théophilus Gerardus Steurs (13 June 1901 – 7 June 1961) was a Belgian long-distance runner. He competed in the marathon at the 1924 and 1928 Summer Olympics.
