= Marcel Alavoine =

Belgian long-distance runner

Personal information
- Nationality: Belgian
- Born: 3 April 1898 Templeuve, Belgium
- Died: 30 November 1967 (aged 69)

Sport
- Sport: Long-distance running
- Event: Marathon

Marcel Alavoine (3 April 1898 – 30 November 1967) was a Belgian long-distance runner. He competed in the marathon at the 1924 Summer Olympics.
