= Russell Payne (athlete) =

American middle-distance runner

Personal information
- Full name: Charles Russell Payne
- Nationality: American
- Born: May 14, 1902 Cincinnati, Ohio, United States
- Died: June 1970

Sport
- Sport: Middle-distance running
- Event: Steeplechase

Charles Russell Payne (May 14, 1902 – June 1970) was an American middle-distance runner. He competed in the men's 3000 metres steeplechase at the 1924 Summer Olympics.
