= Antenore Negri =

Italian long-distance runner

Personal information
- Nationality: Italian
- Born: 20 November 1898 Milan, Italy
- Died: 9 February 1970 (aged 71)

Sport
- Country: Italy
- Sport: Athletics
- Events: Long-distance running 3000 metres steeplechase

Antenore Negri (20 November 1898 – 9 February 1970) was an Italian long-distance runner who competed at the 1924 Summer Olympics,
