= Éamonn Fitzgerald =

Irish Gaelic footballer

Personal information
- Native name: Éamonn Mac Gearailt (Irish)
- Born: 1948 (age 77–78) Killarney, County Kerry
- Height: 5 ft 9 in (175 cm)

Sport
- Sport: Gaelic football
- Position: Goalkeeper
Club
- Years: Club
- 1960s-1980s: Dr. Crokes
Club titles
- Kerry titles: 4
- Munster titles: 2
- All-Ireland Titles: 1
Inter-county
- Years: County
- 1972-1973: Kerry
Inter-county titles
- Munster titles: 1
- All-Irelands: 0
- NFL: 2
- All Stars: 0

Éamonn Fitzgerald (born 1948 in Killarney, County Kerry) is an Irish former sportsperson. He played Gaelic football with his local club Dr. Crokes and was a member of the Kerry senior inter-county team from 1972 until 1973.

At club level he won 3 Kerry Senior Football Championships, a Munster Senior Club Football Championship and an All-Ireland Senior Club Football Championship with East Kerry.
