= Donald Robertson (athlete) =

Scottish marathon runner (1905–1949)

Personal information
- Born: 7 October 1905 Glasgow, Scotland
- Died: 14 June 1949 (aged 43) Glasgow, Scotland

Sport
- Sport: Athletics
- Event: marathon
- Club: Maryhill Harriers, Glasgow
Medal record
Men's athletics
Representing Scotland
British Empire Games
Silver medal – second place	1934 London	Marathon

Donald McNab Robertson (7 October 1905 – 14 June 1949) was a Scottish athlete who competed in the 1936 Summer Olympics.

== Biography ==
Robertson born in Glasgow, became the national marathon champion after winning the British AAA Championships title at the 1932 AAA Championships. He successfully retained his title at the 1933 AAA Championships and 1934 AAA Championships.

Robertson represented Scotland at the 1934 Empire Games and won the silver medal in the marathon competition.

Robertson regained the marathon title at the 1936 AAA Championships, before being selected to represent Great Britain at the 1936 Olympic Games held in Berlin, where he finished seventh in the Olympic marathon event.

Robertson won 1937 AAA Championships marathon title and finished fourth in the marathon contest at the 1938 Empire Games representing Scotland at the 1938 British Empire Games. At the time of the 1938 Games he was a coach painter and lived at 95 Garnet Street in Glasgow.

Robertson won another AAA Championships title at the 1939 AAA Championships before his career was interrupted by World War II.

Robertson was on the podium of the AAA marathon twice more in 1946 and 1947 but died in Glasgow on 14 June 1949 from a pulmonary embolism aged 43.
