= Sidney Newey =

British athlete

Personal information
- Full name: Sidney Archibald Newey
- Nationality: British
- Born: 5 March 1899 Aston
- Died: 9 July 1966 (aged 67) Sutton Coldfield

Sport
- Sport: Athletics
- Event: 3000 metres steeplechase

Sidney Newey (5 March 1899 - 9 July 1966) was a British athlete who competed at the 1924 Summer Olympics.
