= John Ryan (runner) =

Irish long-distance runner

Personal information
- Full name: John Joe Ryan
- Nationality: Irish
- Born: 23 February 1893
- Died: 6 January 1963 (aged 69)

Sport
- Sport: Athletics
- Events: 10,000 metres, cross country
- Club: Tipperary AC
Medal record
Representing Ireland
Tailteann Games
Gold medal – first place	1924 Dublin	4 miles
Gold medal – first place	1924 Dublin	3000 metres steeplechase
International Cross Country Championships
Silver medal – second place	1925 Dublin	Individual
Silver medal – second place	1925 Dublin	Team

John Ryan (23 February 1893 – 6 January 1963) was an Irish long-distance runner. He competed in the men's 10,000 metres at the 1924 Summer Olympics.
