= Joe Blewitt =

British long-distance runner (1895–1954)

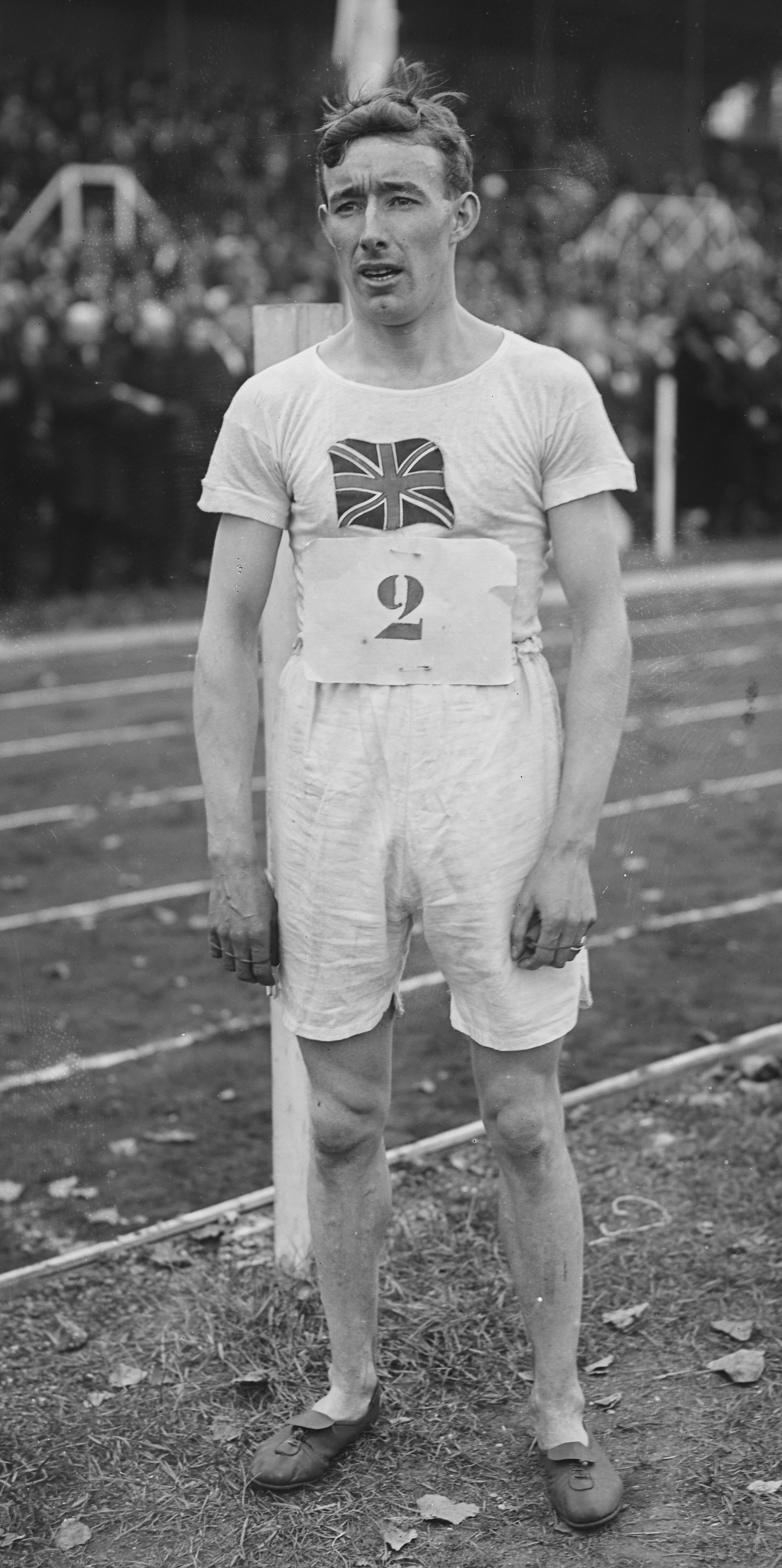
- Joe Blewitt in 1921

Personal information
- Born: 1 November 1895 Upton-upon-Severn, Worcestershire, England
- Died: 30 May 1954 (aged 58) Birmingham, England

Sport
- Sport: Athletics
- Event: 800–10,000 m
- Club: Birchfield Harriers

Achievements and titles
- Personal bests: 880 yd – 2:02.6 (1920); Mile – 4:21.6 (1923); 3000 m – 8:49.3e (1920); 5000 m – 15:15.2 (1922); 10,000 m – 32:44.4 (1921); 10 miles – 53:45.6 (1919); 3000 mS – 10:17.0 (1924)
Medal record
Representing Great Britain
Olympic Games
Silver medal – second place	1920 Antwerp	3000 m team
Representing England
International Cross Country Championships
Gold medal – first place	1921 Caerleon	Team
Gold medal – first place	1923 Maisons-Laffitte	Individual
Gold medal – first place	1924 Newcastle-on-Tyne	Team
Silver medal – second place	1922 Glasgow	Team
Silver medal – second place	1923 Maisons-Laffitte	Team

Charles Edward Blewitt (1 November 1895 – 30 May 1954), also known as Joe Blewitt, was a British runner who competed for Great Britain at the 1920 Summer Olympics and 1928 Summer Olympics.

== Career ==
Blewitt won Midland Championships over distances ranging from 880 yd to 10 miles. He was English national and international champion in cross-country running.

Blewitt became the National 10 miles champion after winning the AAA Championships title at the 1919 AAA Championships. Blewitt became the National 4 mile champion after winning the AAA Championships title at the 1920 AAA Championships. The following month at the 1920 Olympic Games held in Antwerp, Belgium, he finished fifth in the 3000 metres and 5000 metres, earning a silver medal in the 3000 metres team event.

Blewitt was British 4 mile champion for 1922, 1923 and 1925, although the 1923 event was by virtue of being the best placed British athlete after finishing behind the legendary Finn Paavo Nurmi.

Shortly after he won the steeplechase title at the 1924 AAA Championships, he withdrew from the 1924 Olympic steeplechase race due to an injury.

At the 1928 Olympic Games, he failed to reach the final of the 3000 m steeplechase.
