= John Cuthbert (athlete) =

Canadian long-distance runner

Personal information
- Nationality: Canadian
- Born: 16 December 1894 Glasgow, Scotland
- Died: 10 May 1960 (aged 65)

Sport
- Sport: Long-distance running
- Event: Marathon

John Cuthbert (16 December 1894 – 10 May 1960) was a Scottish-born Canadian long-distance runner. He competed in the marathon at the 1924 Summer Olympics, finishing thirteenth. Cuthbert competed in the 1930 British Empire Games marathon, but did not finish.
