= Sam Ferris =

British long-distance runner

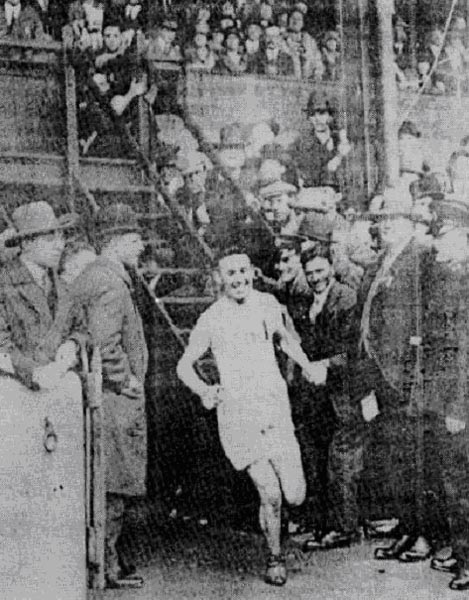
- Samuel Ferris during the Polytechnic Marathon

Personal information
- Nationality: British (Northern Irish)
- Born: 29 August 1900 Dromore, Northern Ireland
- Died: 21 March 1980 (aged 79) Torquay, England
- Height: 174 cm (5 ft 9 in)
- Weight: 60 kg (132 lb)

Sport
- Sport: Athletics
- Event: Long distance/marathon
- Club: Royal Air Force; Shettleston Harriers/Herne Hill Harriers
Medal record
Men's athletics
Representing Great Britain
Olympics
Silver medal – second place	1932 Los Angeles	Marathon
Representing England
British Empire Games
Silver medal – second place	1930 Hamilton	Marathon
Representing Ireland
International Cross Country Championships
Silver medal – second place	1925 Dublin	Team

Samuel Ferris (29 August 1900 – 21 March 1980) was a British and Northern Irish long-distance running athlete who competed mainly in the marathon and competed at the 1932 Summer Olympics.

== Career ==
Ferris was born in Magherabeg, near Dromore, County Down in Northern Ireland.

Ferris became the national marathon champion after winning the British AAA Championships title at the 1925 AAA Championships. He successfully retained his title at both the 1926 AAA Championships and the 1927 AAA Championships.

He won a silver medal for Great Britain in the marathon at the 1932 Olympic Games.

He served as the second president of the then recently formed UK Road Runners Club during 1954.
