= Dunky Wright =

Scottish marathon runner

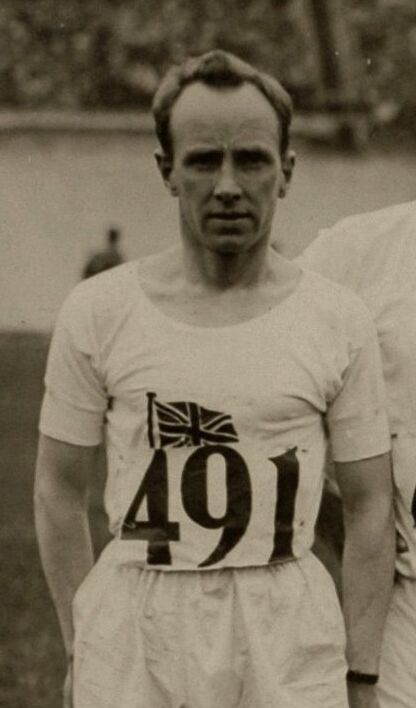
- Wright at the 1928 Summer Olympics

Personal information
- Nationality: British (Scottish)
- Born: 22 September 1896 Glasgow, Scotland
- Died: 21 August 1976 (aged 79) Glasgow, Scotland
- Height: 175 cm (5 ft 9 in)
- Weight: 62 kg (137 lb)

Sport
- Sport: Athletics
- Event: Long-distance
- Club: Clydesdale Harriers; Shettleston Harriers; Caledonian Harriers; Maryhill Harriers
Medal record
Men's Athletics
Representing Scotland
British Empire Games
Gold medal – first place	1930 Hamilton	Marathon
Bronze medal – third place	1934 London	Marathon

Duncan MacLeod Wright (22 September 1896 – 21 August 1976), also known as Dunky Wright, was a Scottish athlete who competed at three Olympic Games.

== Career ==
Wright born in Glasgow, won the 1923 Scottish Cross Country Championship as a member of the Clydesdale Harriers.

Wright competed for Great Britain at the 1924 Summer Olympics in Paris, France, but did not finish the Olympic marathon race. The following year Wright finished third behind Sam Ferris in the marathon event at the 1925 AAA Championships.

Three years in later at the 1928 Summer Olympics, he finished 20th in the 1928 Olympic marathon. At the 1930 Empire Games he won the gold medal in the marathon competition. At the time of the Games he was living at 4 Corunna Street in Glasgow and was a salesman by profession.

Wright became the national marathon champion after winning the British AAA Championships title at the 1930 AAA Championships. He then retained his title the following year at the 1931 AAA Championships.

Wright finished second behind fellow Scot Donald Robertson in the marathon at the 1932 AAA Championships. Shortly afterwards he was selected to represent Great Britain at the 1932 Olympic Games in Los Angeles. This was his final Olympic appearance and he finished fourth in the marathon event.

At the 1934 Empire Games he won the bronze medal in the marathon contest.

He won The Morpeth, a long running race in England, a record of seven times between 1927 and 1934. He died on 21 August 1976.
