= Jean-Baptiste Manhès =

French long-distance runner

Personal information
- Nationality: French
- Born: 4 February 1897
- Died: 23 April 1963 (aged 66)

Sport
- Sport: Long-distance running
- Events: 5,000m, 10,000m, marathon

Jean-Baptiste Manhès (4 February 1897 – 23 April 1963) was a French long-distance runner. He competed at the 1920 and 1924 Summer Olympics.
