= Cathal mac Áeda =

Cathal mac Áeda (before 722–737) was a king in southern Brega of the Uí Chernaig sept of Lagore of the Síl nÁedo Sláine. He was the son of Áed Laigin mac Néill (died 722) and great-great grandson of the high king Diarmait mac Áedo Sláine (died 665). His father was slain at the Battle of Allen in the great defeat of the Ui Neill by the men of Leinster. He was chief of the Uí Chernaig from 729 to 737.

An isolated reference in the Annals of Ulster for the year 733 has 'the overthrow of Cathal by Domnall in Tailtiu, and the overthrow of Fallomun by Cathal in Tlachtga'. The consensus view among historians is that the Cathal mentioned was Cathal mac Finguine (died 742), King of Munster. However, the historian Charles-Edwards argues in favor of Cathal mac Áeda. He cites the lack of mention of this event in the Munster oriented Annals of Innisfallen. This theory proposes that Domnall attacked Cathal at Tailtiu, where the Uí Néill high kings traditionally held their main óenach. He was attacked there by Domnall Midi of the Clann Cholmáin branch and defeated. This was a step in the rise to Domnall as high king. Cathal however defeated the minor Uí Néill kindred of Clann Cholmáin Bicc under Fallomon mac Con Congalt at Tlachtga, the Hill of Ward, the site of another major Uí Néill óenach.

The Uí Chernaig sept had a feud with the Uí Chonaing sept of Cnogba (Knowth) in North Brega going back to the assassination of Cathal's grandfather Niall mac Cernaig Sotal (died 701) by Írgalach mac Conaing (died 702). In 737 the Uí Chonaing king of Brega, Conaing mac Amalgado (died 742) defeated Cathal and his kinsman Cernach mac Fogartaig (d.738) at the Battle of Lia Ailbe in Mag nAilbe (Moynalvy, Co. Meath) and Cathal was slain.

Tha family descended from Áed Laigin was a sub-sept of the Uí Chernaig known as the Sil Áeda Laigen. The death of Cathal's brother Domnall mac Áeda is recorded in the annals in 759.

== See also ==
- Kings of Brega
