= Fallomon mac Con Congalt =

Follaman mac Con Congalt (died 766), also written Fallomon mac Con Congelt, was King of Mide, a kingdom of the Uí Néill in central Ireland in modern County Westmeath and County Meath.

== Background ==
Follaman belonged to the Clann Cholmáin Bicc branch of the southern Uí Néill, a kin group which traced its descent from Colmán Bec, son of Diarmait mac Cerbaill and, rather less certainly, from Niall of the Nine Hostages. Clann Cholmáin Bicc's own lands lay around Lough Lene, in Mide, the west-central part of the southern Uí Néill kingdoms, from which the names Meath and Westmeath are derived. The remainder of the southern Uí Néill formed the kingdoms of Tethbae, in the north-west midlands, north and west of the River Inny and east of the River Shannon, and Brega in the east midlands, east of the upper part of the River Boyne and its tributary the River Blackwater. The leading branch of Clann Cholmáin Bicc was later known as the Coille Follamain, or Caille Follamain, after Follaman himself. Its name is preserved in that of Killallon, some miles north-west of Clonmellon.

Clann Cholmáin Bicc were perhaps in the shadow of the neighbouring Clann Cholmáin, in full Clann Cholmáin Máir, the descendants of Colmán Bec's brother Colmán Már, whose lands lay to the south-west around the hill of Uisnech. Until the 8th century, both were in a secondary position, the leadership of the southern Uí Néill being held by the Síl nÁedo Sláine of Brega, descended from Diarmait's son Áed Sláine. During the period when the Síl n'Áedo Sláine were dominant in the midlands, only one descendant of Colmán Bec was prominent, his son Óengus mac Colmáin who may, perhaps, have been King of Tara, or more probably was appointed as deputy in the midlands—he is called "king of the Uí Néill" at his death—by northerner Suibne Menn.

In the 8th century, a prolonged internal struggle among the various branches of the Síl nÁedo Sláine led to their decline and the rise of Clann Cholmáin Máir and perhaps also Clann Cholmáin Bicc.

== Life ==
The last of Follaman's ancestors to be reported in the Irish annals is his great-grandfather Fáelchú, who died in the early 660s. The earliest record of Follaman is in 733. Early in that year open warfare broke out among the northern Uí Néill, between Flaithbertach mac Loingsig of Cenél Conaill, who was the reigning High King of Ireland, and Áed Allán of Cenél nEógain, who would eventually force Flaithbertach to abdicate and become a pilgrim or monk.

Later in the year, war is reported in the midlands. The Annals of Ulster record that Cathal—usually taken to be Cathal mac Finguine, King of Munster—was first of all defeated by Domnall Midi and Clann Cholmáin Máir at Tailtiu, site of the main Uí Néill óenach, and then victorious against Follaman and Clann Cholmáin Bicc at the Hill of Ward, site of the óenach of Tlachtga, second in importance only to that of Tailtiu. However, a recent reinterpretation of this record has been proposed. Rather than identifying Cathal with Cathal mac Finguine, Charles-Edwards suggests that this is Cathal mac Áeda of the Síl n'Áedo Sláine, King of Lagore.

Nothing further is recorded of Follaman until after the death of Domnall Midi in 763, at which time he appears as an ally of Domnall's kin and, in particular, Domnall's son Donnchad Midi. This alliance is presumed to have existed from the earliest part of Domnall's reign, if not before, which began when he defeated and killed Áed Allán in 743.

In 765 Follaman is recorded as aiding Donnchad against Murchad, another of Domnall Midi's sons. Murchad was killed at Carn Fiachach, near present-day Rathconrath, fighting against Follaman and Donnchad. Follaman was killed in 766, at which time he is called king of Mide. The Annals of Ulster call the killing "treacherous", while the Annals of Tigernach call it "deceitful". Since Donnchad was the main beneficiary—he became King of Mide after this—it has been suggested that the killing was on his orders.

Fallomon mac Con Congalt Clann Cholmáin
Regnal titles
Preceded by Domnall Midi	King of Mide c. 763 – 766	Succeeded by Donnchad Midi
