= Lughnasadh =

Irish holiday and Gaelic harvest festival

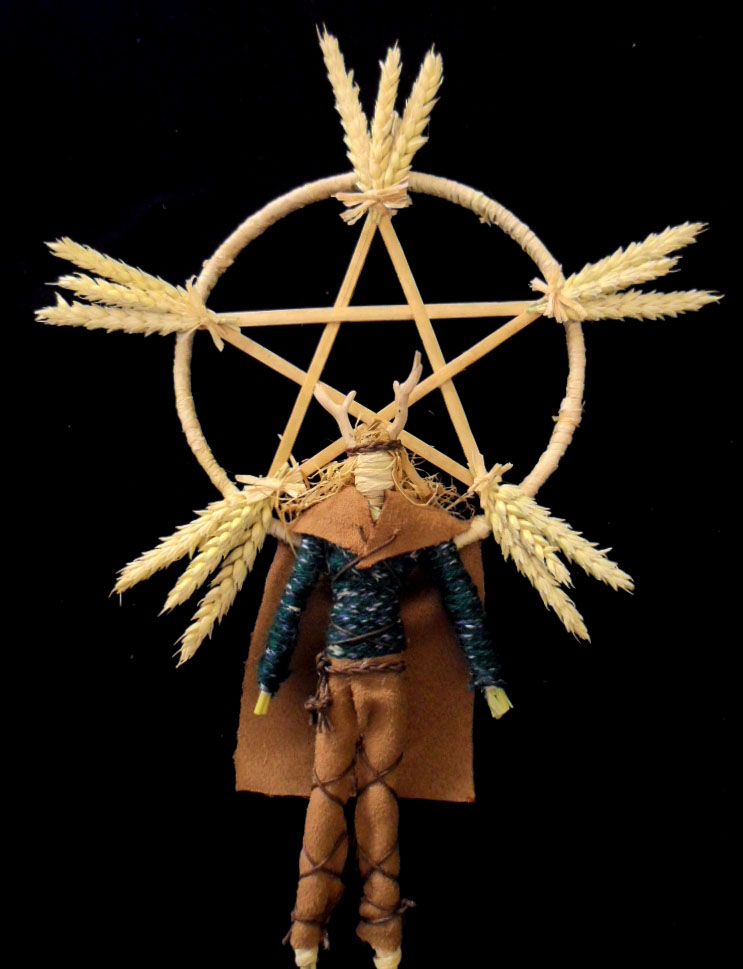
- A corn dolly representing the God Lugh
- Also called: Lúnasa (Modern Irish); Lùnastal (Scottish Gaelic); Luanistyn (Manx Gaelic)
- Observed by: Historically: Gaels; Today: Irish people, Scottish people, Manx people, Celtic neopagans, Wiccans
- Type: Cultural, Pagan (Celtic polytheism, Celtic neopaganism)
- Significance: beginning of the harvest season
- Celebrations: Offering of First Fruits, feasting, handfasting, fairs, athletic contests
- Date: 1 August
- Related to: Calan Awst, Lammas

Lughnasadh, Lughnasa or Lúnasa (/ˈluːnəsə/ LOO-nə-sə, Irish: [ˈl̪ˠuːnˠəsˠə]) is a Gaelic festival marking the beginning of the harvest season. Historically, it was widely observed throughout Ireland, Scotland, and the Isle of Man. Traditionally, it is held on 1 August, or about halfway between the summer solstice and autumn equinox. In recent centuries, some celebrations have shifted to Sundays near this date. Lughnasadh is one of the four Gaelic seasonal festivals, along with Samhain, Imbolc, and Beltane. It corresponds to the Welsh Gŵyl Awst and the English Lammas.

Lughnasadh is mentioned in early Irish literature and has pagan origins. The festival is named after the god Lugh. In the Middle Ages, it involved great gatherings that included ceremonies, athletic contests (most notably the Tailteann Games), horse racing, feasting, matchmaking, and trading. According to folklorist Máire MacNeill, evidence suggests that the religious rites included an offering of the First Fruits, a feast of the new food, the sacrifice of a bull, and a ritual dance-play. In recent centuries, Lughnasadh gatherings have typically been held atop hills and mountains, including many of the same activities.

The festival persisted widely until the 20th century, with the event called Garland Sunday, Bilberry Sunday, Mountain Sunday, and Crom Dubh Sunday. The tradition of climbing hills and mountains at Lughnasadh has survived in some areas and is recast as a Christian pilgrimage. The best known is the Reek Sunday pilgrimage to the north top of Croagh Patrick on the last Sunday in July. Several fairs are also believed to be survivors of Lughnasadh, such as the Puck Fair. Since the late 20th century, Celtic neopagans have observed Lughnasadh, or something based on it, as a religious holiday. In some places, festival elements have been revived as a cultural event.

== Name ==
In Old Irish the name was Lugnasad (Modern Irish: [ˈl̪ˠʊɣnˠəsˠəd̪ˠ]). This is a combination of Lug (the god Lugh) and násad (an assembly), which is unstressed when used as a suffix. Another theory is that it originated from the word nás (death), rather than násad. Later spellings include Luᵹ̇nasaḋ, Lughnasadh and Lughnasa.

In Modern Irish, the spelling is Lúnasa [ˈl̪ˠuːnˠəsˠə], which is also the name for August. The genitive case is also Lúnasa as in Mí Lúnasa (Month of August) and Lá Lúnasa (Day of Lúnasa). In Modern Scottish Gaelic (Gàidhlig), the festival and the month are both called Lùnastal [ˈl̪ˠuːnəs̪t̪əl̪ˠ]. In Manx (Gaelg), the festival and the month are both called Luanistyn [ˈluanɪstθən]. The day itself may be called either Laa Luanistyn or Laa Luanys.

In Welsh (Cymraeg), the day is known as Calan Awst, originally a Latin term, meaning the Calends of August. In Breton (brezhoneg), the day was known as Gouel Eost, the Feast of August.

== Mythology and folklore ==
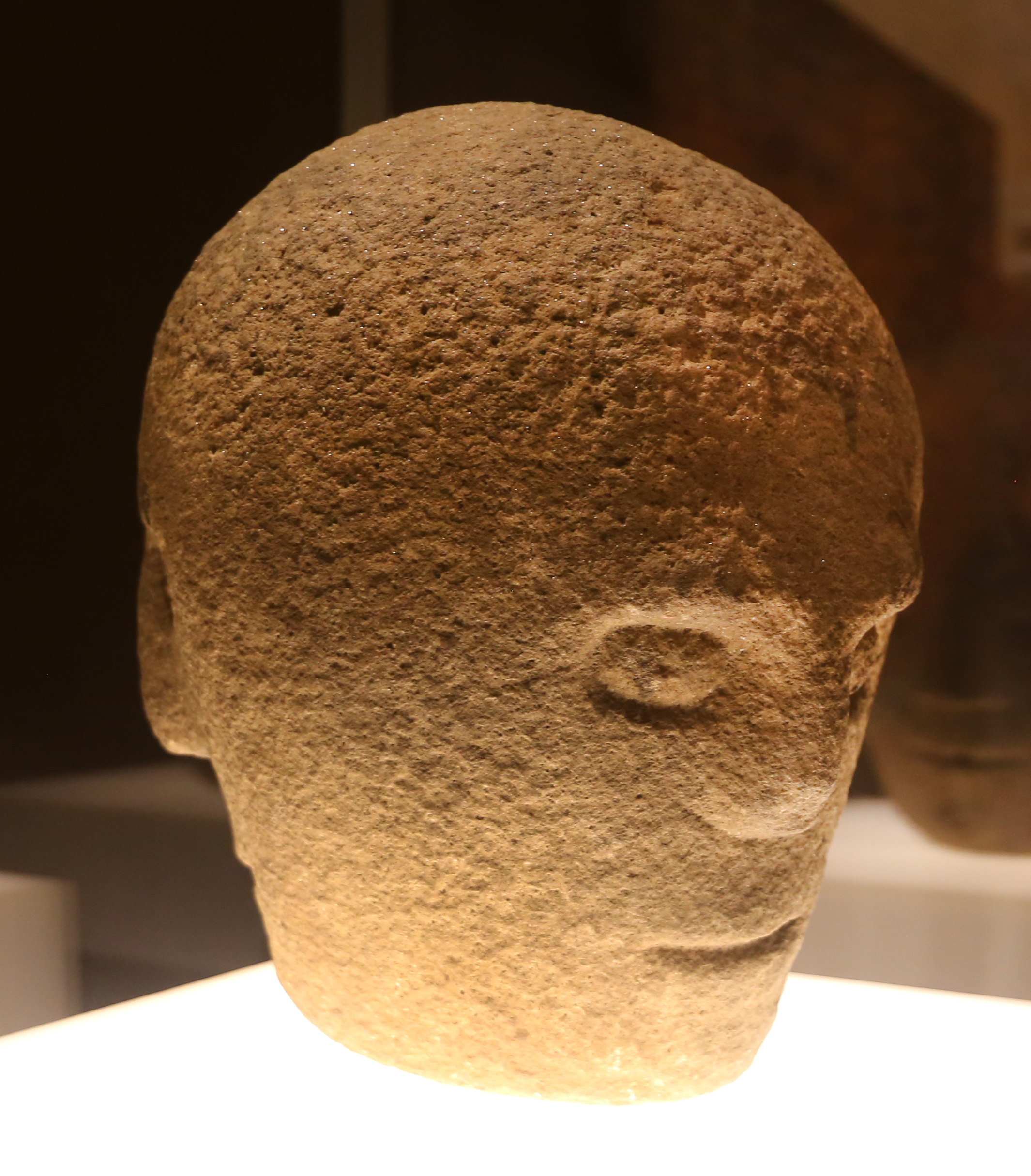
The Corleck Head is a carved stone head with three faces associated with a site of Lughnasadh celebrations in Ireland. It dates from the 1st or 2nd century AD.

In Irish mythology, Lughnasadh is said to have been founded by the god Lugh as a funeral feast and athletic competition—funeral games—to commemorate the death of an earth goddess. Irish myths about Lughnasadh and Lughnasadh sites tend to feature a woman who is carried off or held against her will, and who dies of grief, shame, exhaustion, or unspecified natural causes. Parallels with the Greek tale of Persephone have been noted. A story about the Lughnasadh site of Tailtin says the festival was founded by Lugh as funeral games in memory of his foster-mother Tailtiu. She was said to have died of exhaustion after clearing the plains of Ireland for agriculture. Tailtiu may have been an earth goddess who represented the dying vegetation that fed mankind. Another tale, about the assembly site of Naas, says that Lugh founded the festival in memory of his two wives, the sisters Nás and Bói. One theory is that it was a mourning (or wake) for the end of summer.

Folklorist Máire MacNeill extensively studied the later folklore and traditions of Lughnasadh. She concludes that the main theme is a struggle for the harvest between two gods. One god, usually called Crom Dubh in later folklore, guards the grain as his treasure. The other god, Lugh, must seize it for mankind. Sometimes, this was portrayed as a struggle over a woman called Eithne, who represents the grain. Lugh also fights and defeats a figure representing blight. MacNeill says that these themes can be seen in earlier Irish mythology, particularly in the tale of Lugh defeating Balor, which seems to represent the overcoming of blight, drought and the scorching summer sun. In surviving folklore, Lugh is usually replaced by Saint Patrick, while Crom Dubh is a pagan chief who owns a granary or a bull and who opposes Patrick, but is overcome and converted. Crom Dubh is likely the same figure as Crom Cruach and shares some traits with the Dagda and Donn. He may be based on an underworld god like Hades and Pluto, who kidnaps the grain goddess Persephone but is forced to let her return to the world above before harvest time.

== Historic customs ==
In the Middle Ages, the Óenach Tailten or Áenach Tailten (modern spelling: Aonach Tailteann) was held each Lughnasadh at Tailtin in what is now County Meath. According to medieval literature, kings attended this óenach and a truce was declared for its duration. It was similar to the Ancient Olympic Games and included ritual athletic and sporting contests, horse racing, music and storytelling, trading, proclaiming laws and settling legal disputes, drawing-up contracts, and matchmaking. At Tailtin, young couples entered into trial marriages by joining hands through a hole in a wooden door. The trial marriage lasted a year and a day, at which time it could be made permanent or broken without consequences. After the 9th century the Óenach Tailten was celebrated irregularly and it gradually died out. It was revived for a period in the 20th century as the Tailteann Games. Another Lughnasadh gathering, the Óenach Carmain, was held in what is now County Kildare. Carman is also believed to have been a goddess, perhaps one with a similar tale as Tailtiu. The Óenach Carmain included a food market, a livestock market, and a market for foreign traders. A 15th-century version of the Irish legend Tochmarc Emire ("the Wooing of Emer") is one of the earliest documents to record these festivities.

From the 18th century to the mid 20th century, many Lughnasadh customs and folklore were recorded. In 1962 The Festival of Lughnasa, a study of Lughnasadh by folklorist Máire MacNeill, was published. MacNeill studied surviving Lughnasadh customs and folklore as well as the earlier accounts and medieval writings about the festival. She concluded that the evidence testified to the existence of an ancient festival around 1 August that involved the following:

A solemn cutting of the first of the corn of which an offering would be made to the deity by bringing it up to a high place and burying it; a meal of the new food and of bilberries of which everyone must partake; a sacrifice of a sacred bull, a feast of its flesh, with some ceremony involving its hide, and its replacement by a young bull; a ritual dance-play perhaps telling of a struggle for a goddess and a ritual fight; an installation of a [carved stone] head on top of the hill and a triumphing over it by an actor impersonating Lugh; another play representing the confinement by Lugh of the monster blight or famine; a three-day celebration presided over by the brilliant young god [Lugh] or his human representative. Finally, a ceremony indicating that the interregnum was over, and the chief god in his right place again.

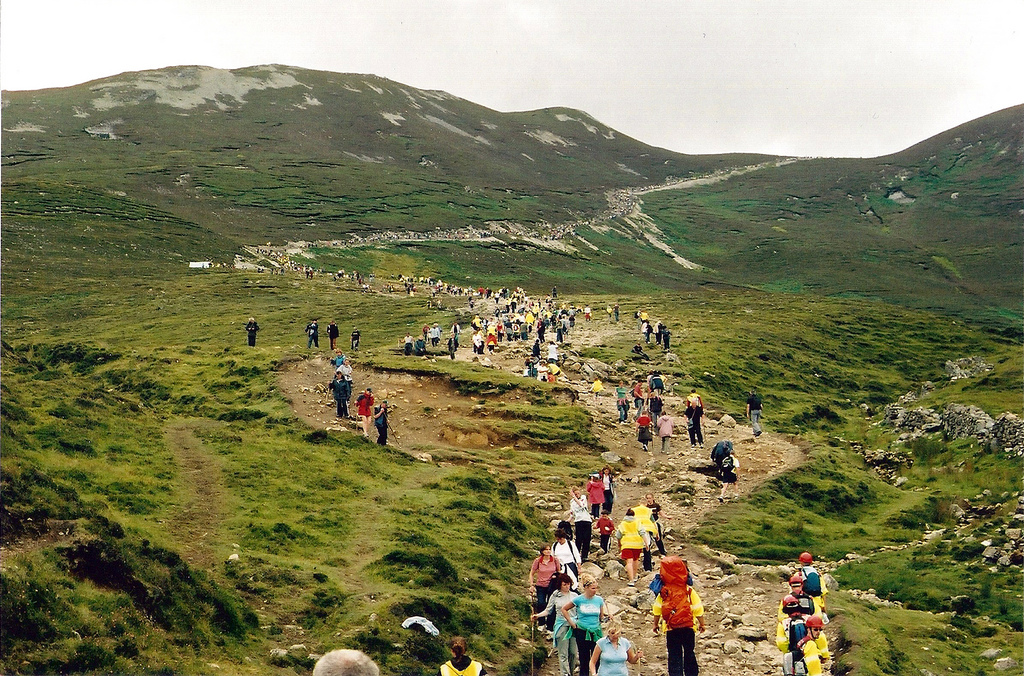
Pilgrims climbing Croagh Patrick on Reek Sunday. It is believed that climbing hills and mountains has formed a major part of the festival since ancient times, and the Reek Sunday pilgrimage is likely a continuation of this tradition.

Many of the customs described by medieval writers survived into the modern era, though they were either Christianized or shorn of any pagan religious meaning. Lughnasadh occurred during a poor time of the year for the farming community when the old crops were done and the new ones not yet ready for harvest. Many of Ireland's prominent mountains and hills were climbed at Lughnasadh. Some of the treks were re-cast as Christian pilgrimages, the most well-known being Reek Sunday – the yearly pilgrimage to the top of Croagh Patrick in late July. Other hilltop gatherings were secular and attended mostly by the youth. On the Iveragh Peninsula, a pilgrimage to the summit of Drung Hill was part of local Lughnasadh celebrations until it died out around 1880.

In Ireland, bilberries were gathered and there was eating, drinking, dancing, folk music, games and matchmaking, as well as athletic and sporting contests such as weight-throwing, hurling and horse racing. At some gatherings, everyone wore flowers while climbing the hill and then buried them at the summit as a sign that summer was ending. In other places, the first sheaf of the harvest was buried. There were also faction fights, whereby two groups of young men fought with sticks. In 18th-century Lothian, Scotland, rival groups of young men built towers of sods topped with a flag. For days, each group tried to sabotage the other's tower, and at Lughnasadh they met each other in 'battle'.

Bull sacrifices at Lughnasadh time were recorded as late as the 18th century at Cois Fharraige in Ireland, where they were offered to Crom Dubh, and at Loch Maree in Scotland, where they were offered to Saint Máel Ruba. Special meals were made with the first produce of the harvest. In the Scottish Highlands, people made a special cake called the lunastain, which may have originated as an offering to the gods.

Another custom that Lughnasadh shared with Imbolc and Beltane was visiting holy wells, some specifically clootie wells. Visitors to these wells would pray for health while walking sunwise around the well; they would then leave offerings, typically coins or clooties. Although bonfires were lit at some of the open-air gatherings in Ireland, they were rare and incidental to the celebrations.

Traditionally, Lughnasadh has always been reckoned as the first day of August. In recent centuries, however, much of the gatherings and festivities shifted to the nearest Sundays – either the last Sunday in July or first Sunday in August. It is believed this is because the coming of the harvest was a busy time and the weather could be unpredictable, which meant work days were too important to give up. As Sunday would have been a day of rest anyway, it made sense to hold celebrations then. The festival may also have been affected by the shift to the Gregorian calendar.

Lughnasadh was a time of unpredictable weather in Ireland. Heavy rains known as "Lammas floods" often coincided with beginning of August and were responsible for destroying the corn. There are many folk sayings that relate to the unpredictable weather conditions during Lughnasadh and the importance of these conditions to the harvest:

"...For Lammas floods, with crops oft havoc play,
And e'en one swept the rustic bridge away."
"August needs the dew as much as men need bread.
After Lammas corn ripens as much by night as by day."

== Today ==
In Ireland some of the mountain pilgrimages have survived. By far the most popular is the Reek Sunday pilgrimage at Croagh Patrick, which attracts tens of thousands of pilgrims each year.

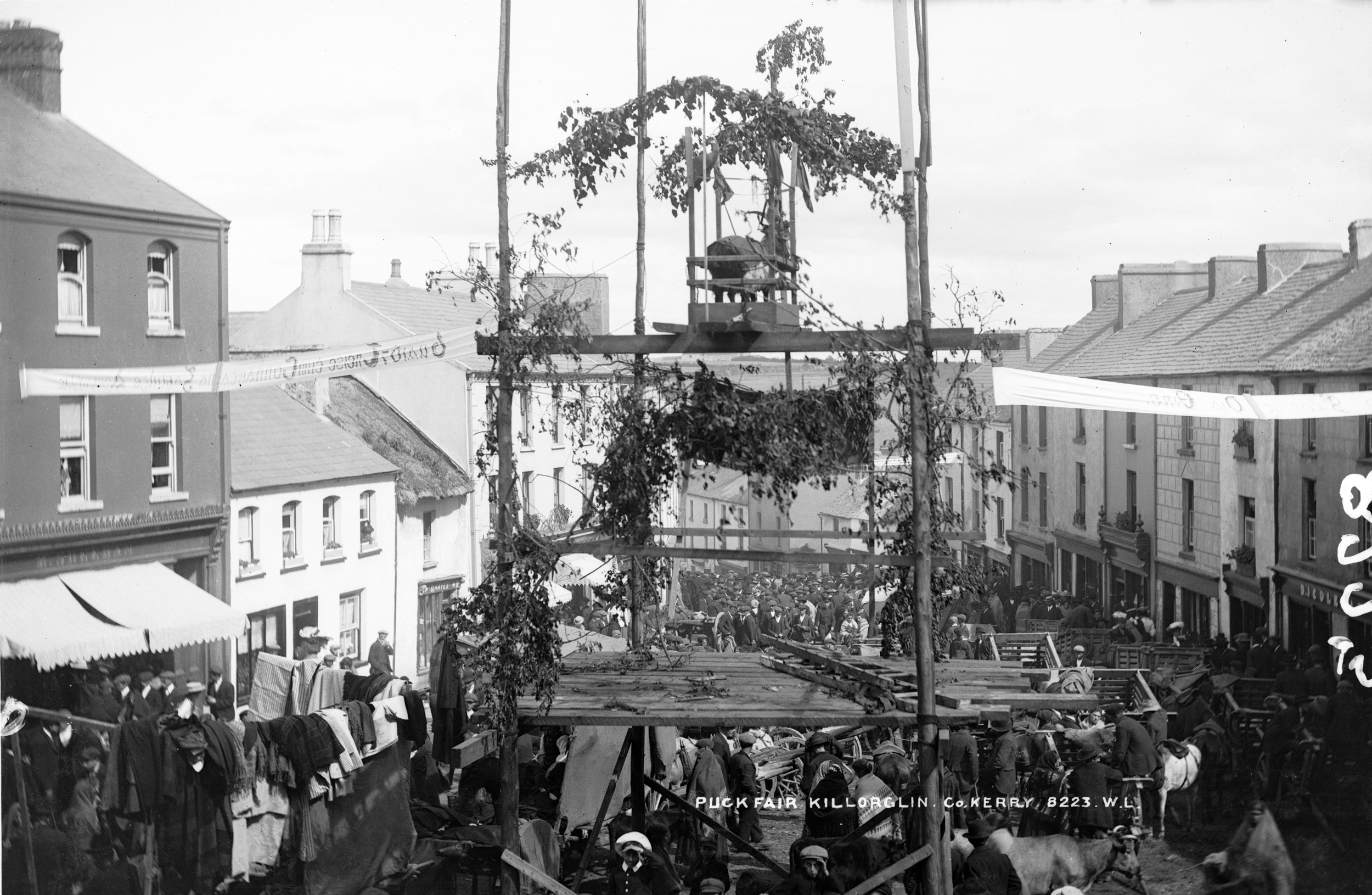
The Puck Fair circa 1900, showing the feral goat (King Puck) atop his "throne"

The Puck Fair is held each year in early August in the town of Killorglin, County Kerry. It has been traced as far back as the 16th century but is believed to be a survival of a Lughnasadh festival. At the beginning of the three-day festival, a feral goat is brought into the town and crowned "king", while a local girl is crowned "queen". The festival includes traditional music and dancing, a parade, arts and crafts workshops, a horse and cattle fair, and a market. It draws a great number of tourists each year.

In recent years, other towns in Ireland have begun holding yearly Lughnasa Festivals and Lughnasa Fairs. Like the Puck Fair, these often include traditional music and dancing, arts and crafts workshops, traditional storytelling, and markets. Such festivals have been held in Gweedore, Sligo, Brandon, Rathangan and a number of other places. Craggaunowen, an open-air museum in County Clare, hosts a yearly Lughnasa Festival at which historical re-enactors demonstrate elements of daily life in Gaelic Ireland. It includes displays of replica clothing, artefacts, weapons and jewellery. A similar event has been held each year at Carrickfergus Castle in County Antrim. In 2011 RTÉ broadcast a Lughnasa Live television program from Craggaunowen.

In the Irish diaspora survivals of the Lughnasadh festivities are often seen by some families still choosing August as the traditional time for family reunions and parties, though due to modern work schedules these events have sometimes been moved to adjacent secular holidays, such as the Fourth of July in the United States.

The festival is referenced in the 1990 play Dancing at Lughnasa by Brian Friel, which was adapted into a 1998 film of the same name.

=== Neopaganism ===
Lughnasadh is, or similar festivities based on it are, observed by some modern Pagans in general and Celtic neopagans in particular. Despite their common name, such Lughnasadh celebrations can differ widely. Some attempt to emulate the historic festival as much as possible, while others (such as Wiccans) base their celebrations on various festivals, the Gaelic festival being only one of them.

Neopagans usually celebrate Lughnasadh on 1 August in the Northern Hemisphere and 1 February in the Southern Hemisphere, often beginning their festivities at sunset the evening before. Some neopagans celebrate it at the astronomical midpoint between the summer solstice and autumn equinox, or the full moon nearest this point. In 2022, this astronomical midpoint falls on 7 August (Northern hemisphere) or 4 February (Southern hemisphere).

==== Celtic Reconstructionist ====
Celtic Reconstructionist pagans strive to reconstruct ancient Celtic religion. Their practices are based on research and historical accounts, but may be modified slightly to suit modern life. They avoid syncretic or eclectic approaches that combine traditions from different cultures.

Celtic Reconstructionists who follow Gaelic traditions tend to celebrate Lughnasadh at the time of "first fruits", or on the full moon nearest this time. In the Northeastern United States, this is often the time of the blueberry harvest, while in the Pacific Northwest the blackberries are often the festival fruit. In Celtic Reconstructionism, Lughnasadh is seen as a time to give thanks to the spirits and deities for the beginning of the harvest season, and to propitiate them with offerings and prayers not to harm the still-ripening crops. The god Lugh is honoured by many at this time, and gentle rain on the day of the festival is seen as his presence and his bestowing of blessings. Many Celtic Reconstructionists also honour the goddess Tailtiu at Lughnasadh, and may seek to keep the Cailleachan from damaging the crops, much in the way appeals are made to Lugh.

==== Wicca ====
Wiccans use the names "Lughnasadh" or "Lammas" for the first of their autumn harvest festivals. It is one of the eight yearly "Sabbats" of their Wheel of the Year, following Midsummer and preceding Mabon. It is seen as one of the two most auspicious times for handfasting, the other being at Beltane. Some Wiccans mark the holiday by baking a figure of the "corn god" in bread, and then symbolically sacrificing and eating it.

== See also ==
- Aonach
- Celtic calendar
- Ferragosto
- Gaelic calendar
- Wheel of the Year
- Lìqiū (立秋)
- First Fruits
