= Tailteann Games =

Tailteann Games or Aonach Tailteann may refer to:

- Tailteann Games (ancient) sporting and religious festival in Gaelic Ireland
- Tailteann Games (Irish Free State) held 1924–32
- Tailteann Games, Athletics Ireland schools' inter-provincial championships, held since 1963

== See also ==
- Tailteann (disambiguation)
