= Tailteann =

Tailteann may refer to:

- Teltown (Irish: Tailtin, genitive Tailteann), townland in County Meath, Ireland
- Tailteann Games (ancient), Gaelic festival held at Teltown until the twelfth century
- Tailteann Games (Irish Free State), Gaelic sports and cultural festival held 1924–1932
- Tailteann Cup, second-tier inter-county Gaelic football competition introduced in 2022
- Rás Tailteann, annual Irish road cycling stage race
- Páirc Tailteann, Gaelic games stadium in Navan, County Meath, Ireland
