= Puck Fair =

Traditional fair held in Ireland

Puck Fair Aonach an Phoic
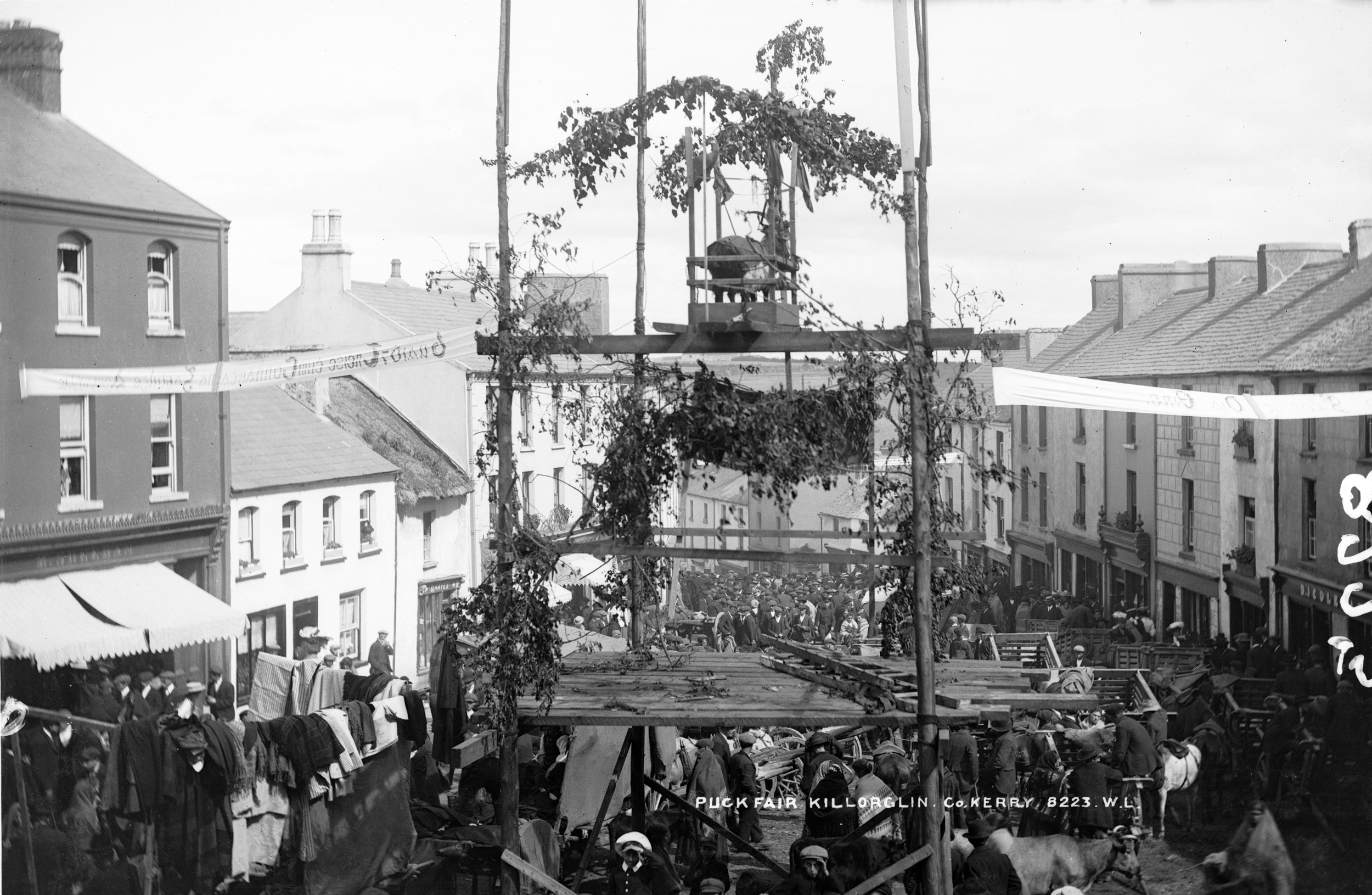
- Puck Fair circa 1900
- Status: Active
- Genre: Fair
- Date: August 10–12
- Frequency: Annually
- Venue: Streets, pubs
- Locations: Killorglin, County Kerry
- Coordinates: 52.1064°N 9.7869°W
- Country: Ireland
- Years active: 1613—present, perhaps older
- Major events: Wild goat capture and crowning, coronation parade, horse and cattle fairs, street markets, festivity, fireworks.
- Website: puckfair.ie

The Puck Fair (Irish: Aonach an Phoic, meaning "Fair of the He-Goat", poc being the Irish for a male goat) is one of Ireland's oldest fairs. It takes place annually from 10–12 August in Killorglin, County Kerry.

== Description ==
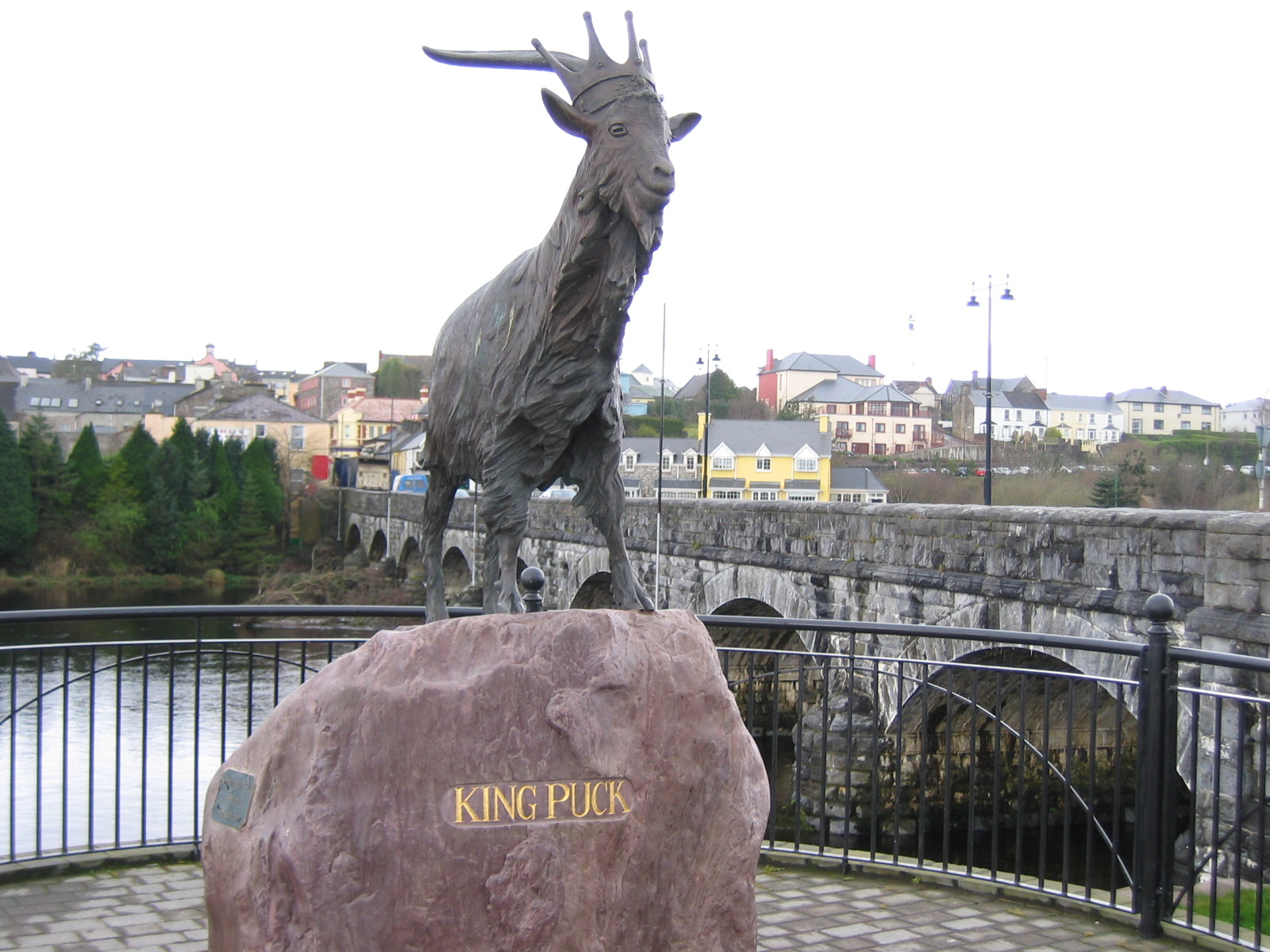
Bronze statue of "King Puck" in Killorglin

Every year a group of people go up into the MacGillycuddy's Reeks mountain range and catch a feral goat. The goat is brought back to the town and the "Queen of Puck", traditionally a young schoolgirl from one of the local primary schools, crowns the goat "King Puck".

The goat is then put into a small cage on a high stand for three days, and on the third day of the fair, he is brought down to be led back to the mountains. In the middle of the town square, he is crowned and this signifies that the festivities may begin. The pubs stay open until 3 am, a legal exception from the usual 2 am closing time. This is a source of contention with the local police.

More recently, following significant objections from animal rights groups, "King Puck" has only been displayed on the fair stand for a couple of hours rather than three whole days.

=== Markets ===
Tradition dictates that a horse fair takes place on the first day and on the second day there is a cattle fair. There are usually many street vendors during the festival who advertise their wares to the large numbers of tourists who come to Killorglin for the fair.

== History ==
The fair itself is purported to be ancient but can only officially be traced back as far as 1613 when King James I issued a charter granting legal status to the existing fair in Killorglin. Despite this fact, its roots are still unknown, although there are several legends of its origins.

One of the legends of the fair is that the event pays tribute to a goat that broke away from its herd, while the rest of the herd headed towards the mountains, and warned the town's inhabitants while the “Roundheads” were pillaging the countryside around Shanara and Kilgobnet at the foot of the McGillycuddy Reeks. The advancing army of Oliver Cromwell during his conquest of Ireland in the 17th century triggered the pillages around the countryside. The goat's arrival alerted the inhabitants of danger, and they immediately set out to protect the town and their herds. Although the song An Puc ar Buile has become associated with this legend, the story of the song has nothing to do with it. The words were written by Dónall Ó Mulláin in 1940 and is set in 20th century rural Ireland.

Scholars speculate that the fair's origins stem from Pre-Christian Ireland, from the Celtic festival of Lughnasa which symbolised the beginning of the harvest season, and that the goat is a pagan fertility symbol.

In 1905, that year's King Puck goat, named King Skellig Mör, was purchased by the Knights of Saint Brendan, a fraternal order of Irish-Americans. Following a legal dispute over the goat's ownership, it was donated to the USS Vermont to serve as its mascot.

In 1931, Margaret Murray tied the Puck Fair into her version of the witch-cult hypothesis, asserting that it was a pre-Christian festival in honour of the Horned God. However, historians Jeffrey B. Russell and Brooks Alexander have asserted that "Today, scholars are agreed that Murray was more than just wrong – she was completely and embarrassingly wrong on nearly all of her basic premises."

In 1941, a ballet entitled Puck Fair, based on a poem about the fair by F. R. Higgins, was staged at the Gaiety Theatre. The ballet was choreographed by Cepta Cullen and composed by Elizabeth Maconchy, with set design by Mainie Jellett

In 1993 folk singer Christy Moore released the album King Puck.

The 2020 and 2021 festivals were cancelled due to the COVID-19 pandemic, but the event returned in 2022. High temperatures necessitated taking the goat down from its high stand for a number of breaks.

== See also ==
- Gaelic Ireland
- Irish mythology
- Takam
