= Funeral games =

Contests associated with the funeral observances for ancient heroes

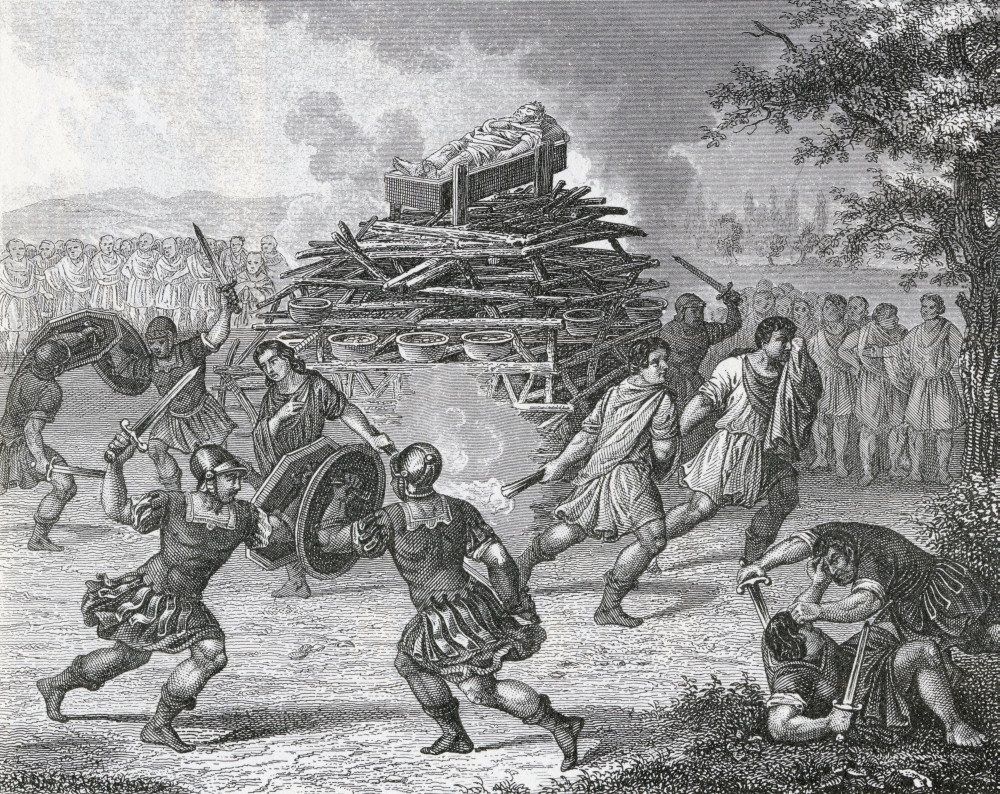
Gladiators fighting during funeral games in Ancient Rome, 19th-century engraving.

Funeral games are athletic competitions held in honor of a recently deceased person. The celebration of funeral games was common to a number of ancient civilizations. Athletics and games such as wrestling are depicted on Sumerian statues dating from approximately 2600 BC, and funeral games are depicted in early Greek vases, such as the Francois vase at Florence and the Amphiaraus vase in Berlin. In some accounts, funeral games were not merely held to honor the deceased, but in order to propitiate the spirits of those who had died.

== Ancient Greece ==
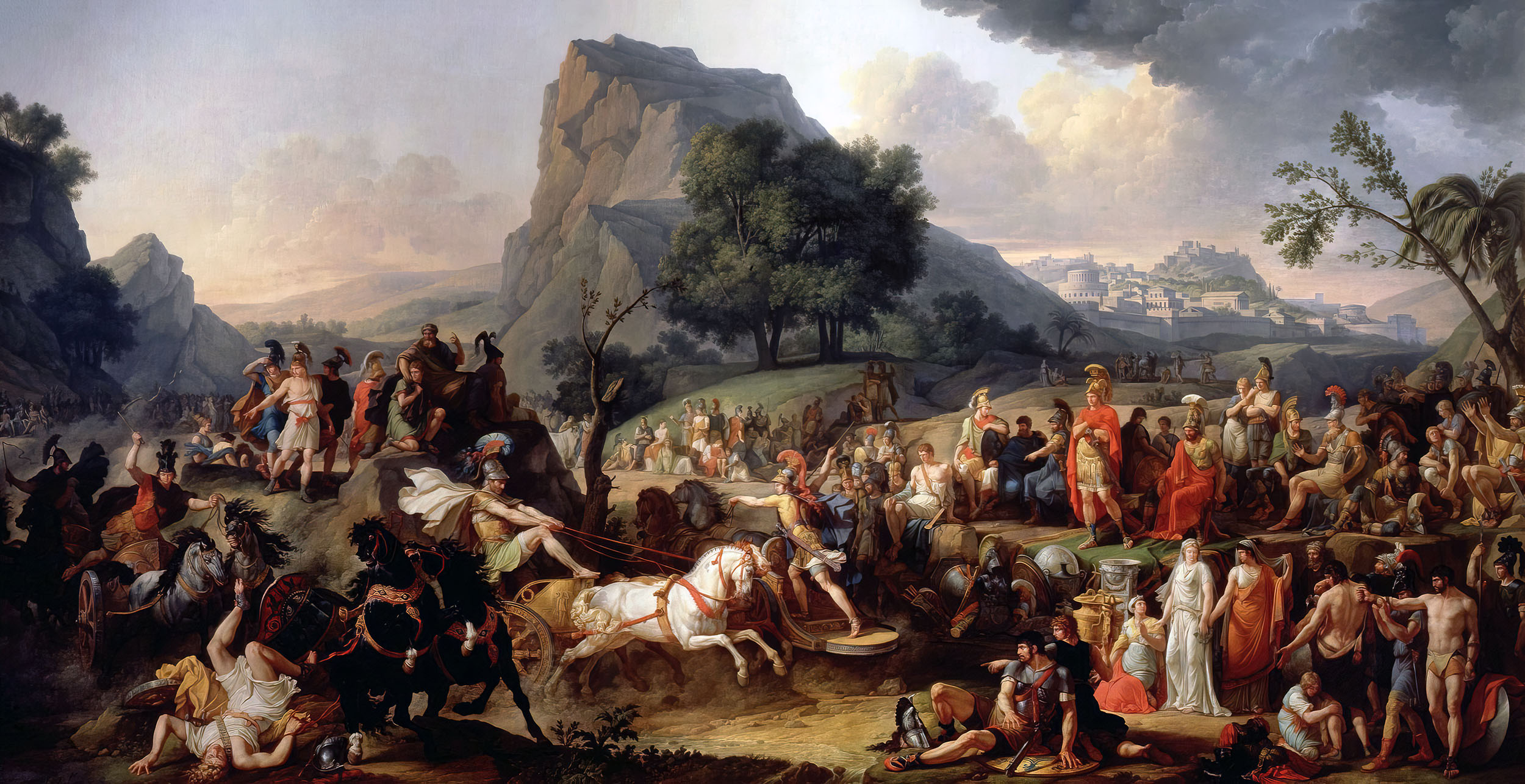
Funeral Games in honour of Patroclus, painting by Carle Vernet, 1790

According to literary tradition, funeral games were a regular feature of Mycenean Greek society. The Iliad describes the funeral games held by Achilles in honor of Patroclus, and a similar competition was attributed by Virgil to Aeneas, who held games on the anniversary of his father's death. Many of the contests were similar to those held at the Olympic Games, and although those were held in honor of Zeus, many scholars see the origin of Olympic competition in these earlier funeral games. Historical examples of funeral games in ancient Greece are known from the late sixth century BC until the end of the Hellenistic period. They could celebrate either civic heroes, such as the founders of cities, or private individuals, and in either case might become annual events.

=== Civic heroes ===
Persons considered heroes sometimes became the focus of hero cults, in which case funeral games might be held as part of their cult ritual. In a civic context, games might be held to honor public figures acclaimed as heroes, or sometimes whole groups of people, such as soldiers from the city who had fallen in battle. It was customary for the participants to be citizens of the towns where the games were held.

One example of such games was held at Amphipolis, in honor of the Spartan general Brasidas. Brasidas had fallen in battle while capturing the city of Amphipolis during the Peloponnesian War, in 422 BC. After the battle, he became revered as the new founder of the city, displacing Hagnon, who established an Athenian colony there in 437. Subsequently, Brasidas' funeral games became an annual event at Amphipolis.

=== Private individuals ===
On the island of Amorgos in the Cyclades, Aleximachus Critolaus held a series of funeral games at the town of Aigiale in honor of his son, Aleximachus. The celebrations, which became an annual festival, included sacrifices, a banquet, and a variety of athletic competitions for which prizes were awarded. The most important event was the pankration; but the dead Aleximachus was always declared the winner of this competition, suggesting that he had been an athlete himself.

=== Prizes ===
A variety of prizes were awarded to the competitors at Greek funeral games. The most common prize was an olive wreath or crown, made from the branches of a sacred olive tree. This crown was the most revered prize awarded. In the early period, other prizes awarded included useful commodities such as tripods, kettles, double cups, and various farm animals. In later times, precious metals such as gold, silver, bronze, or steel were also awarded.

== Pre-Christian Ireland ==
Competitions known as Aonachs were held in Ireland in the Bronze Age. The most famous of which was the Aonach Tailteann "Tailtin Fair", held at Tailtin (Teltown) in Mide. According to the Annals of the Kingdom of Ireland, the fair was established by the legendary king Lugh Lámhfhada (reigned 1849 to 1809 BC) in honor of his foster-mother, Tailtiu. These games are known to have been held during Ireland's medieval period, perhaps as early as the sixth century, but died out after the Norman Invasion of Ireland in the twelfth century. Some sources date the games themselves to the midpoint of Lugh's reign, in 1829 BC, claiming that they predate the Greek Olympics by over a thousand years, and even that they were the inspiration for the Olympic Games.
