= Cernach mac Fogartaig =

Cernach mac Fogartaig (died 738) was a king in southern Brega of the Uí Chernaig sept of Lagore of the Síl nÁedo Sláine branch of the southern Ui Neill. He was the son of the high king Fogartach mac Néill (died 724). He appears as a leader of the Uí Chernaig in the years 737-738.

The Uí Chernaig sept had a feud with the Uí Chonaing sept of Cnogba (Knowth) in North Brega going back to the assassination of Cernach's grandfather Niall mac Cernaig Sotal (died 701) by Írgalach mac Conaing (died 702). In 737 the Uí Chonaing King of Brega Conaing mac Amalgado (died 742) defeated Cernach and his kinsman Cathal mac Áeda at the Battle of Lia Ailbe in Mag nAilbe (Moynalvy, county Meath) and Cathal, leader of the Uí Chernaig, was slain.

Cernach seems to have had a bad reputation and the Annals of Ulster record in 738 at his death:

Cernach, son of Fogartach, is treacherously killed by his own criminal adherents, and the calves of the cows and the women of this lower world for long bewailed him.

== See also ==
- Kings of Brega
