= Patrick Ford (journalist) =

Irish-American journalist

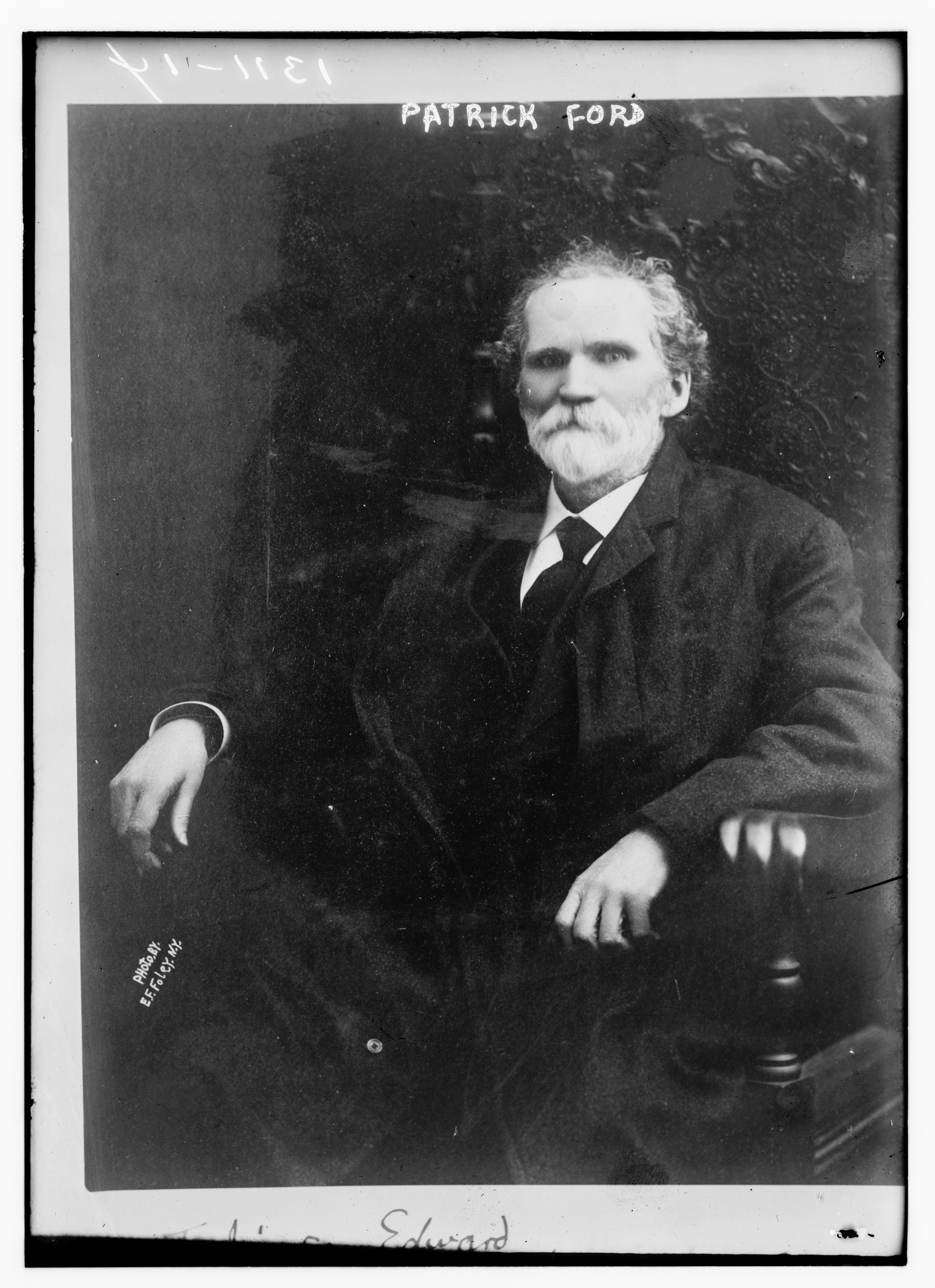
Portrait of Patrick Ford attributed to the Bain News Service

Patrick Ford (12 April 1837 – 23 September 1913) was an Irish-American journalist and Georgist land reformer.

== Biography ==
Ford was born in Galway to Edward Ford (1805–1880) and Ann Ford (1815–1893), emigrating with his parents to Boston, United States in 1845, never returning to Ireland. He wrote in the Irish World in 1886 that "I might as well have been born in Boston. I know nothing of England. I brought nothing with me from Ireland—nothing tangible to make me what I am. I had consciously at least, only what I found and grew up with in here".

He left school aged thirteen and two years later was working as a printer's devil for William Lloyd Garrison's Liberator. He began writing in 1855 and, by 1861, had become editor and publisher of the Boston Tribune, also known as the Boston Sunday Tribune or Boston Sunday Times. He was an abolitionist and a supporter of the Union.

At 15, Ford went to work as a "printer's devil" for William Lloyd Garrison's newspaper, The Liberator. He credited Garrison for his advocacy for social reform.

During the American Civil War (1861–1865) Ford served in Union forces in the Ninth Massachusetts Regiment with his father and brother. He saw action in northern Virginia and fought at Fredericksburg.

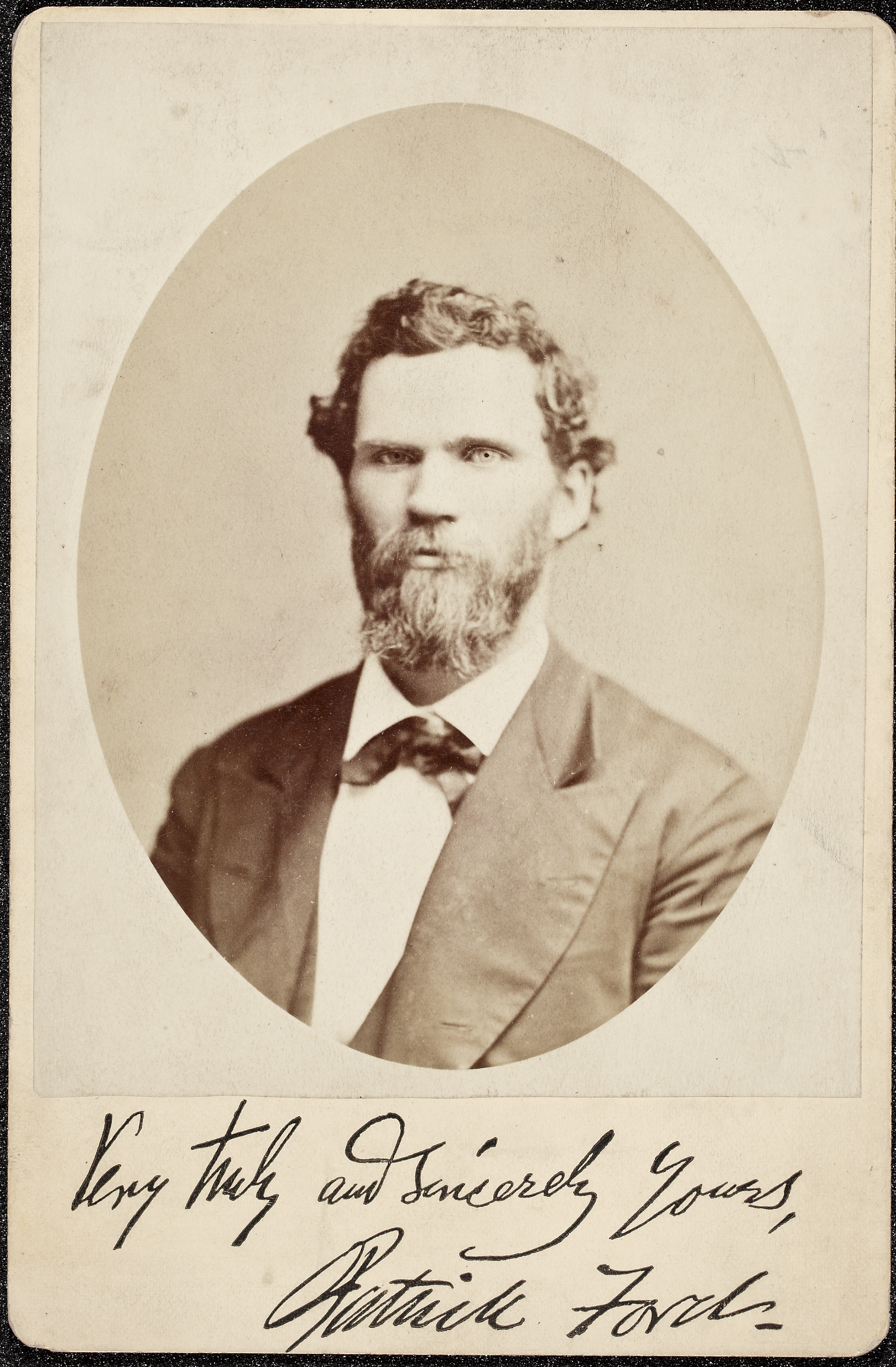
Portrait of Ford with signature

He spent four years after the war in Charleston, editing the Southern Carolina Leader, printed to support newly freed slaves. He settled in New York City in 1870 and founded the Irish World, which became the principal newspaper of Irish America. It promised "more reading material than any other paper in America" and outsold John Boyle O'Reilly's Boston Pilot.

In 1878, Ford re-titled his newspaper, the Irish World and American Industrial Liberator. During the early 1880s, Ford promoted the writings of land reformer, Henry George in his paper. The paper promoted a range of progressive causes such as women's rights and trade unionism. Originally the paper was supportive of Franklin Delano Roosevelt but eventually became disenchanted with him believing that he had become a "friend of the money lords".

In 1880, Ford began to solicit donations through the Irish World to support Land League activities in Ireland. Funds received were tabulated weekly under the heading "Land League Fund." Between January and September 1881 alone, more than $100,000 was collected in donations. British Prime Minister William Gladstone would later state that without the funds from the Irish World, "there would have been no agitation in Ireland." In 1881, Ford published The Criminal History of the British Empire, a collection of five letters that he sent to Gladstone.
