= Páirc Tailteann =

Gaelic football stadium in Navan, Ireland

- Interactive map of Páirc Tailteann
- Location: Navan, County Meath, C15 XD83, Ireland
- Coordinates: 53°38′59″N 6°41′38″W
- Owner: Meath G.A.A.
- Capacity: 11,000
- Surface: Grass
- Field size: 135 x 87 m
- Public transit: Mercy Convent bus stop,

Construction
- Opened: 1935

Páirc Tailteann (Irish pronunciation: [ˌpˠaːɾʲc ˈt̪ˠal̠ʲtʲən̪ˠ]) is a Gaelic Athletic Association (GAA) stadium in Navan, County Meath, Ireland. It is the home of the Meath Gaelic football and hurling teams. The ground has had a capacity of between 30,000 and 33,000, but following a safety audit in 2011 the GAA reduced the authorized capacity to 10,000. This was later upped to 17,000. The county board, in 2012, announced plans to refurbish the grounds. In 2013 Meath county board introduced a ticket system The name "Tailteann" alludes to the Tailteann Games, an ancient Gaelic festival held in Teltown (Tailtin) between Navan and Kells.

Páirc Tailteann is the venue of the annual Meath GAA club championship finals, the winners of which receive the Keegan Cup (for football) and the Jubilee Cup (for hurling). It is the principal GAA stadium in County Meath. Redevelopments of the stadium have included the installation of an electronic scoreboard to replace the old, manual scoreboard and the erection of floodlights.

Planning permission given in the first part of 2018 would have led to a Páirc Tailteann with a 21,000-person capacity. In June 2022, this was paused, with the effects of events such as the COVID-19 pandemic, construction inflation, the housing shortage and the Russian invasion of Ukraine all contributing to increased costs.

== See also ==
- List of Gaelic Athletic Association stadiums
- List of stadiums in Ireland by capacity
