= Cepta Cullen =

Irish Ballet Choreographer, dancer, teacher

- Born: December 7, 1914; Dublin, Ireland
- Died: September 1, 1994 (aged 79); Vancouver, Canada
- Other names: Mary Catherine Cullen Concepta Gower
- Occupation: Choreographer

Cepta Cullen (7 Dec 1914–1 Sept 1994) was considered Ireland's "first serious choreographer" and an important figure in the development of Irish Ballet. She was also a performer and teacher, a member of the Imperial Society of Teachers of Dancing (ISTD) and the Royal Academy of Dance (RAD).

Mary Catherine Cullen was born on 7 December 1914 in North King Street, Dublin to parents Thomas and Bridget Cullen.

Cullen trained as a dancer in the Abbey School of Ballet under Ninette de Valois in Dublin. Her career spans from about 1928 to 1944, though she continued to teach. Cullen went on to open her own Ballet school after her teacher left Ireland, and the Abbey school officially closed in 1933. Cullen's school was The Irish Ballet Club, which she founded in 1939 and which was based in the Peacock Theatre, Dublin. The school staged fourteen ballets during its five-year operation.

Possibly the most successful show she choreographed was Puck Fair. The ballet was scripted by the poet F. R. Higgins, designed by Mainie Jellett, and composed by Elizabeth Maconchy. The performance opened in the Gaiety Theatre, Dublin in February 1941. It was a typical example of the work of Cullen between 1939 and 1944. The ballets were often based on Irish themes. Cullen had worked with a number of names from the Irish arts scene. She worked with Micheál Mac Liammóir on a ballet which eventually was written as part of a different production.

Very little is known about Cullen apart from her work in ballet and her impact on ballet in Ireland. She married Lieutenant Richard Patrick Gower (Officer of the Maritime Services - McKee Barracks) on 27 July 1948 in the Church of the Holy Family, Aughrim Street, Dublin. They had two children, Gemma and Richard, and emigrated to Vancouver, Canada in the 1960s. Cullen died there on 1 Sept 1994.
