= Amphiaraos Krater =

Late Corinthian red-ground column krater

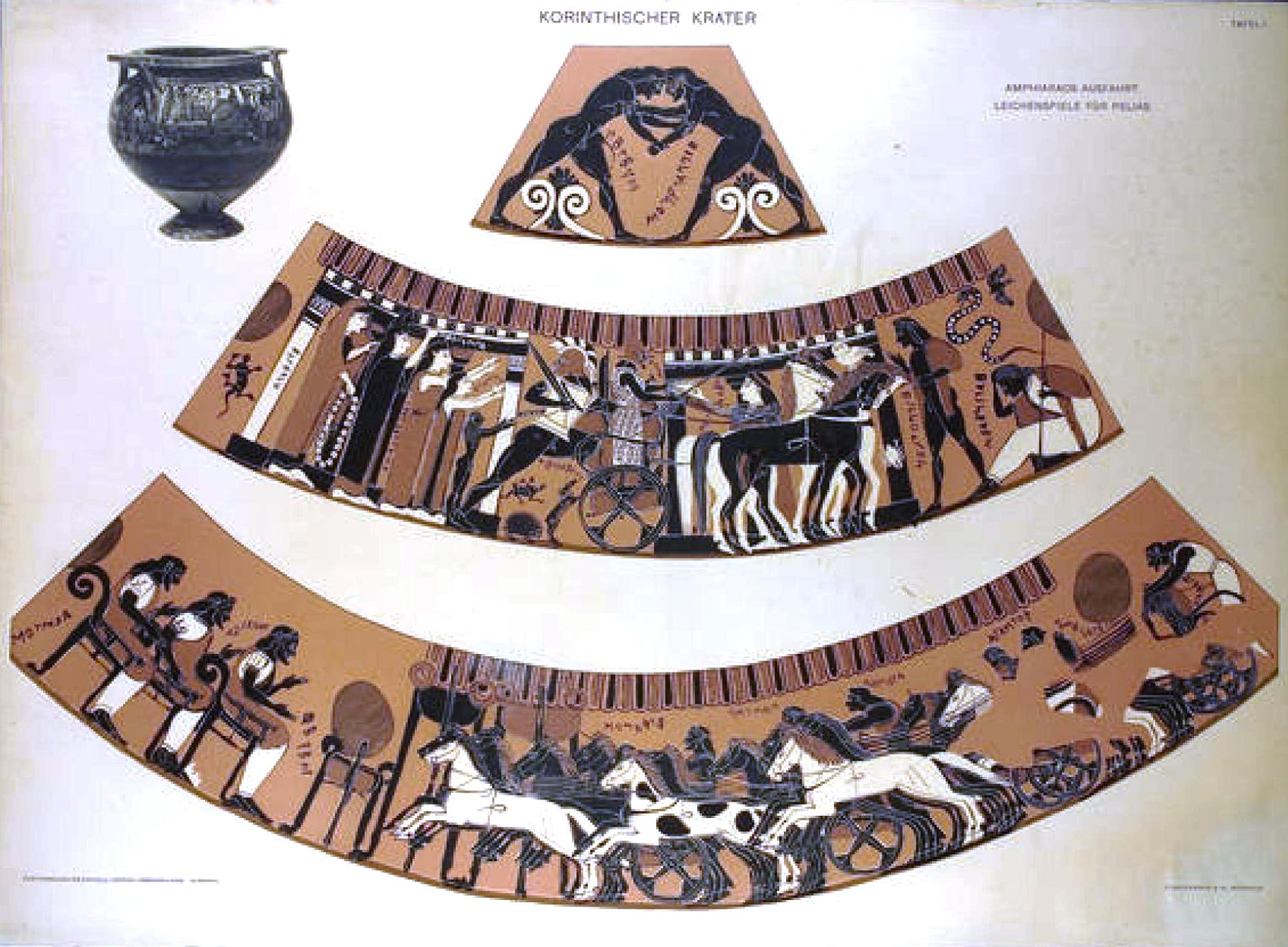
The Amphiaraos krater

The Amphiaraos krater is a Late Corinthian red-ground column krater. It is considered the masterpiece of the Amphiaraos Painter (whose name vase it is) and one of the major specimens of the red-ground vase painting of Corinth.

Dated to circa 560 BC, the Amphiaraos Krater depicts on the front a frieze of horsemen and above it the departure of Amphiaraos. The back was decorated with a battle frieze, above it again Amphiaraos, this time as a participant in the funeral games of Pelias. Below one of the handles, a wrestling match is depicted. The paintings on the vessel are considered especially colourful and detailed. Thus, the anger in Amphiaraos eye, looking at Eriphyle, his only family member not to wish for his safe return, is visible. A sorrowful seer indicates the imminent death of the hero. The same scene was depicted on the Kypselos chest in Olympia, as described by Pausanias. The krater used to be on display in the Antikensammlung Berlin, but disappeared at the end of the Second World War. Since 1945, the Amphiaraos krater has been housed in the State Historical Museum in Moscow.

== Bibliography ==
- Matthias Steinhart: Amphiaraos-Krater, in Der Neue Pauly Bd. 1 (1996), Sp. 609
