= Hill of Ward =

Hill in County Meath, Ireland

Hill of Ward (Tlachtga)
- Tlachtgha / Tlachta (Irish)
- Tlachtga
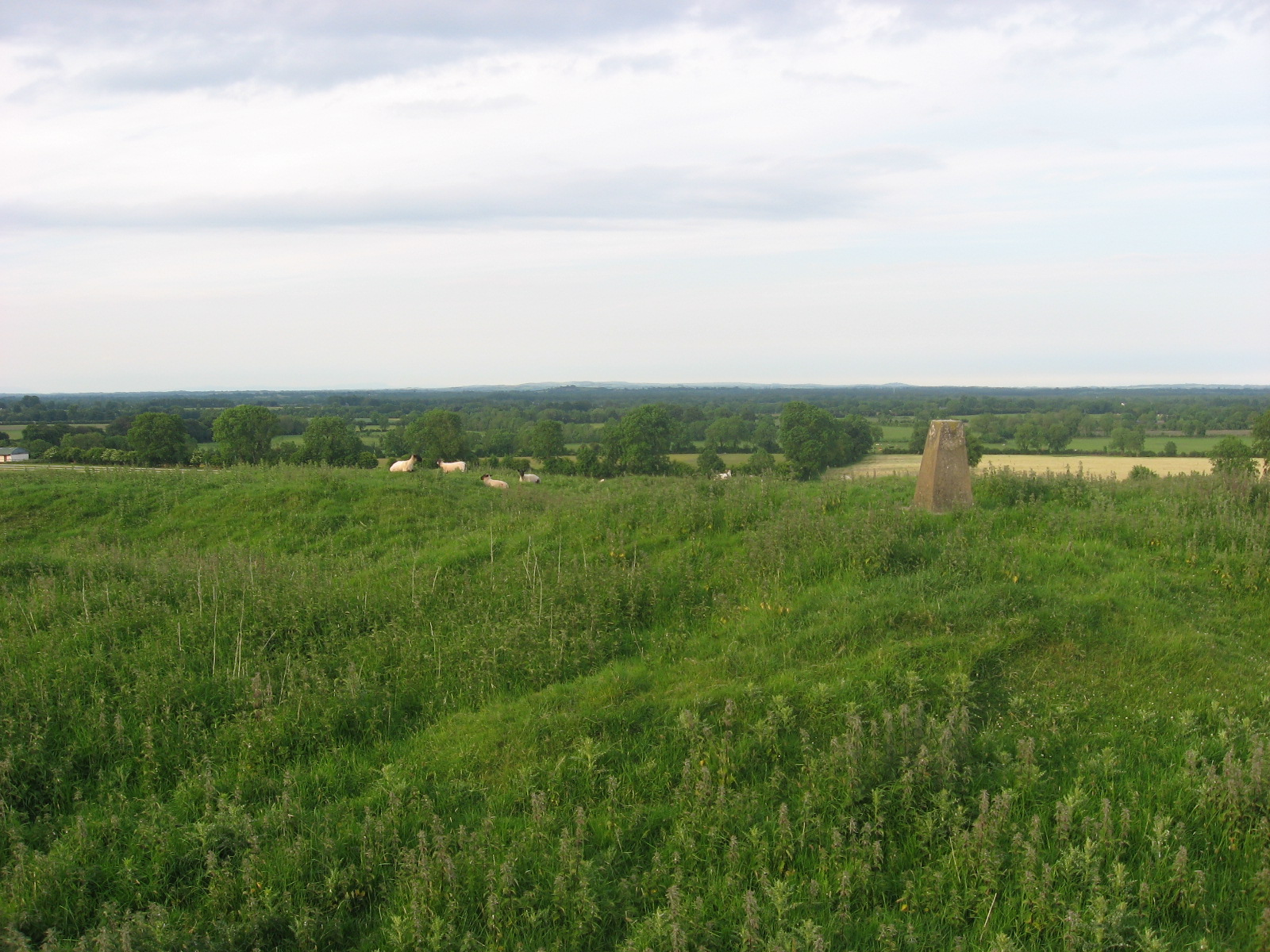

- Location within island of Ireland
- 53.624°N 6.886°W
- Type: Ceremonial earthworks
- Periods: Bronze Age–Iron Age
- Cultures: Gaelic
- Location: County Meath, Ireland

Site notes
- Elevation: 90 m (300 ft)

National monument of Ireland
- Official name: Hill of Ward
- Reference no.: 150

The Hill of Ward, or Tlachtga (Irish: Tlachtgha or Tlachta), is a hill and ancient monument in County Meath, Ireland. It is between Athboy (to the west) and Ráth Chairn (to the east). The hill is topped by a large enclosure of four concentric earthen rings. Tlachtga is mentioned in Irish mythology, and later folklore holds that it was a site where druids held sacrificial bonfires at Samhain. Archaeology has shown that Tlachtga dates to the Bronze Age, and was a site of ritual gatherings associated with feasting and intense burning until the late Iron Age. Later, high kings of Ireland held assemblies there. Since the late 1990s, Celtic neopagans have held yearly Samhain gatherings on the hill. The site is a protected National Monument.

== Myth ==
The name Tlachtga has been translated as "earth spear". In Irish mythology, it is associated with the woman Tlachtga, a druidess who is said to have given birth to triplets on the hill and to have died there. Her father, Mug Ruith, was said to have ridden a flying machine, the roth rámach (rowing wheel), which carried the sun across the sky.

The findemna—Bres, Nár and Lothár—triplet brothers and sons of High King Eochu Feidlech, are said to have dwelt at Tlachtga.

== History ==
In the Middle Ages, Tlachtga was associated with the Kings of Mide (Meath) and of Munster. It was an important assembly site in the kingdom of Meath, along with the Hill of Tara, the Hill of Uisneach, and Tailten.

In 1167 High King Ruaidrí Ua Conchobair held a massive gathering, or aonach, at the site. According to Giraldus Cambrensis in 1172 Tigernán Ua Ruairc, King of Bréifne, was killed there at a parley with Anglo-Norman invaders.

The hill got its English name from its former owner, Sir Hugh Ward, who was dispossessed of his estate during the invasion of Oliver Cromwell in 1649. In the aftermath of the conquest, the lands were granted to a senior officer of the Parliamentarian Roundhead army. The Ward family—once prosperous landowners and the eponymous source of the hill's name, reside in County Meath to this day. In the face of continued persecution, a number of family members withdrew from Ireland and established themselves in the north-west of England.

== Archaeology ==
Recent archaeological work has been done on the site, confirming that it was used as a ritual site for many years.

== See also ==
- Hill of Uisneach
- Hill of Tara
- Royal sites of Ireland
