= Tailtiu =

Presumed Irish goddess

Tailtiu or Tailltiu (Old Irish pronunciation: [ˈt̪al̠ʲt̠ʲu]; modern spelling: Tailte) is a presumed goddess from Irish mythology. The goddess's name is linked to Teltown (Tailteann) in County Meath, site of the ancient and medieval Óenach Tailtenn, a fair-like assembly held during the Lughnasadh harvest festival. A legendary dindsenchas ("lore of places") poem relates a myth connecting the presumed goddess Tailtiu with the site.

== Etymology ==
Various Celtic linguists (de Vries, Vendryes, Guyonvarc'h & Le Roux) link the name Tailtiu to the Irish word for "earth, ground land", talamh, of which tailte is a plural. Her father's name Magmór, means "great plain". This suggests that she was associated with the earth.

Other linguists derive it from a loanword of Brythonic origin represented by the Welsh telediw, "well formed, beautiful."

The mythological character of Tailtiu likely derives her name from the place-name.

== Mythology ==
According to the Book of Invasions, queen Tailtiu was the daughter of Magmór and wife of Eochaid mac Eirc, last Fir Bolg High King of Ireland. Her husband is killed by the invading Tuatha Dé Danann in the Battle of Moytura. She then marries one of the Tuath Dé, Eochaid Garb, and becomes the foster mother of Lugh.

Tailtiu is responsible for clearing the forest of Cuan (Coill Chuan) so that the land could be used for growing crops. She is said to have died and been buried there, which is named Tailtiu after her. Lugh, her foster-son, decrees that funeral games be held there in her honour. This becomes the Óenach Tailtenn (assembly-fair of Tailtiu), and the harvest festival as a whole comes to be known as Lughnasadh (Lugh's festival).

Similar stories are told about the Lughnasadh assembly sites of Nás and Carman.

== Óenach Tailtenn ==
The first Óenach Tailtenn or Áenach Tailteann, also called the Fair of Tailteann or the Tailteann Games, was held at Teltown. Historically, the Óenach Tailtenn was a time for contests of strength and skill, and a favoured time for contracting marriages and winter lodgings. A peace was declared at the festival, and religious celebrations were also held. Aspects of the festival survive in the celebrations of Lughnasadh, and were revived as the "Tailteann Games" for a period in the twentieth century.

In historical times, Tailtiu was where the principal assembly of the early Uí Néill dynasties was held.

From the Locus Project at CELT, Tailte had one or two raths or residences in Munster:

- ráith canann: a ráith of queen Tailte, LL 201; cf. Rathcannon tl., Co. Limerick
- ráith con: rath of queen Tailte, LL 201; in Tuath Tailten, UM 165b, Lec. 514, Stowe D ii 2, 656; cf. Rathcon, in dry. and d. Cashel, Tax

Rathcanann and Rath Con may or may not be identical.

== Annalistic references ==
See Annals of Inisfallen (AI)

- M1095. Taillti, inghen Domhnaill Guitt
- U1127. Tailltiu ingen Murchadha H. Mael Sechlainn ben Tairrdhelbaigh H. Concobuir
- M1170. Taillte, inghen Muirchertaigh Uí Mhaoil Sechlainn, ben Domhnaill mic Murchadha Uí Fherghail, taoisech Muintire Anghaile, d'écc isin cethrachtmhadh bliadhain a h-aoisi./Taillte, daughter of Muircheartach Ua Maeleachlainn, and wife of Domhnall, son of Murchadh Ua Fearghail, chief of Muintir-Anghaile, died in the fortieth year of her age.
- M1171. Tailltin, inghen Conchobhair Uí Maoil Sechlaind, ben Iomhair Uí Chathasaigh, tigherna Saithne.
