= Tlachtga =

Druidess in Irish mythology

Tlachtga (Modern Irish: Tlachta) was a powerful druidess in Irish mythology and the red-haired daughter of the arch-druid Mug Ruith. She accompanied him on his world travels, learning his magical secrets and discovering sacred stones in Italy. Tlachtga's name was attached to the Hill of Ward in County Meath, which was the site of prominent festivals in her honour in the Middle Ages.

== History ==
According to some Irish lore, Tlachtga was raped by Simon Magus while her father was learning magic, and gave birth to three sons Dorb/Doirb, Cuma/Cumma, and Muach. In other versions, she was raped by Magus' three sons. Tlachtga's sons were born on the hill that would bear the name of their mother. The triple birth is a common theme in Celtic mythology, and her death from grief and the construction of a fortress at her grave echoes the story of Macha.

== Sacred hill ==
The Hill of Tlachtga is associated with the Hill of Ward in County Meath, and its celebrations rivaled those at Tailtiu. The major ceremony held at Tlachtga was the lighting of the winter fires at Samhain (November 1). The ringfort built on the hill was associated not only with the kings of Mide, but also with Munster as well. The site was known in the popular culture of medieval Ireland as a place where Mug Ruith's flying machine roth rámach had been seen, and where the ard rí Ruaidrí Ua Conchobair had held a massive assemblage in 1168.
