= Aonach =

Ancient tradition in Ireland

An aonach or óenach was an ancient Irish public national assembly called upon the death of a king, queen, or notable sage or warrior as part of ancestor worship practices. As well as the entertainment, the óenach was an occasion on which kings and notables met under truce and where laws were pronounced and confirmed.

The Aonach had three functions: honoring the dead, proclaiming laws, and funeral games and festivities to entertain. The first function took between one and three days depending on the importance of the deceased, guests would sing mourning chants called the Guba after which druids would improvise songs in memory of the dead called a Cepóg. The dead would then be burnt on a funeral pyre. The second function would then be carried out by the Ollamh Érenn, giving out laws to the people via bards and druids and culminating in the igniting of another massive fire. The custom of rejoicing after a funeral was then enshrined in the Cúitech Fuait, games of mental and physical ability accompanied by a large market for traders.

The most notable fair, that held under the auspices of the High King of Ireland and the Uí Néill, was the Óenach Tailten or "Tailteann Games", which is given prehistoric origins by medieval writers. This was held at Teltown, in modern County Meath, as late as 1770. The compilers of the Irish annals considered violence and disorders at this óenach, or the failure of the incumbent High King to hold the fair, to be of note. The Irish Free State held revivals of the Tailteann Games from 1924 to 1932.

Other important assemblies included that of Tlachtga, held on the Hill of Ward at Samhain, that of Carman, held in County Wexford, that of Uisnech, held at Beltane and that of Raigne in Osraige. Not all had pagan calendrical associations. The Óenach Colmáin, probably held at Lynally, was named for Saint Elo Colman.

In the 1920s the Irish Free State organised 'Aonach an Gharda' which were Garda sports days, the goal of this was to promote athleticism and Gaelic culture.

== Bibliography ==
- Byrne, Francis John (1973), Irish Kings and High-Kings, London: Batsford, ISBN 0713458828
- Charles-Edwards, T. M. (2000), Early Christian Ireland, Cambridge: Cambridge University Press, ISBN 0521363950
- MacKillop, James (1998), Oxford Dictionary of Celtic Mythology, Oxford: Oxford University Press, ISBN 0198609671
- Ó Cróinín, Dáibhí (1995), Early Medieval Ireland 400–1200, Longman History of Ireland, London: Longman, ISBN 0582015650
