= Tailteann Games (ancient) =

Pre-Christian Irish funeral games

The Tailteann Games, also known as the Tailtin Fair, Áenach Tailteann, Aonach Tailteann, Assembly of Talti, Óenach Tailten, Fair of Taltiu or Festival of Taltii, were funeral games associated with the semi-legendary history of Pre-Christian Ireland.

There is a complex of ancient earthworks dating to the Iron Age in the area of Teltown where the festival was historically known to be celebrated off and on from medieval times into the modern era.

== History and archaeology ==
The games were founded, according to the Book of Invasions (Lebor Gabála Érenn), by Lugh Lámhfhada, the Ollamh Érenn (master craftsman or doctor of the sciences), as a mourning ceremony for the death of his foster-mother Tailtiu. Lugh buried Tailtiu underneath a mound in an area that took her name and was later called Tailtin in County Meath.

The event was held during the last fortnight of July and culminated with the celebration of Lughnasadh, or Lammas Eve (1 August). Modern folklore claims that the Tailteann Games started around 1600 BC, with some sources claiming as far back as 1829 BC. Promotional literature for the Gaelic Athletic Association revival of the games in 1924 claimed a later date of their foundation in 632 BC. The games were known to have been held between the 6th and 9th centuries AD. The games were held until 1169–1171 AD when they died out after the Norman invasion.

The ancient aonach had three functions: honoring the dead, proclaiming laws, and funeral games and festivities to entertain. The first function took between one and three days depending on the importance of the deceased. Guests would sing mourning chants called the Guba, after which druids would improvise cepógs, songs in memory of the dead. The dead would then be burnt on a funeral pyre. The second function would then be carried out during a universal truce by the Ollamh Érenn, giving out laws to the people via bards and druids and culminating in the igniting of another massive fire. The custom of rejoicing after a funeral was then undertaken in the Cuiteach Fuait, games of skill, mental and physical ability which followed a funeral.

Games included the long jump, high jump, running, hurling, spear throwing, boxing, contests in swordfighting, archery, wrestling, swimming, and chariot and horse racing. They also included competitions in strategy, singing, dancing and story-telling, along with crafts competitions for goldsmiths, jewellers, weavers and armourers. Along with ensuring a meritocracy, the games would also feature a mass arranged marriage, where couples met for the first time and were given up to a year and a day to divorce on the hills of separation.

In later medieval times, the games were revived and called the Tailten Fair, consisting of contests of strength and skill, horse races, religious celebrations, and a traditional time for couples to contract "handfasting" trial marriages. "Taillten marriages" were legal up until the 13th century. This trial marriage practice is documented in the fourth and fifth volumes of the Brehon law texts, which are compilations of the opinions and judgements of the Brehon class of Druids (in this case, Irish). The texts as a whole deal with copious detail for the Insular Celts.

== Modern revivals and legacy ==
From the late 19th century, the Gaelic Athletic Association (GAA) and others in the Gaelic revival contemplated reviving the Tailteann Games. The GAA's 1888 championships of football and of hurling were unfinished owing to the American Invasion Tour, an unsuccessful attempt to raise funds for a revival.

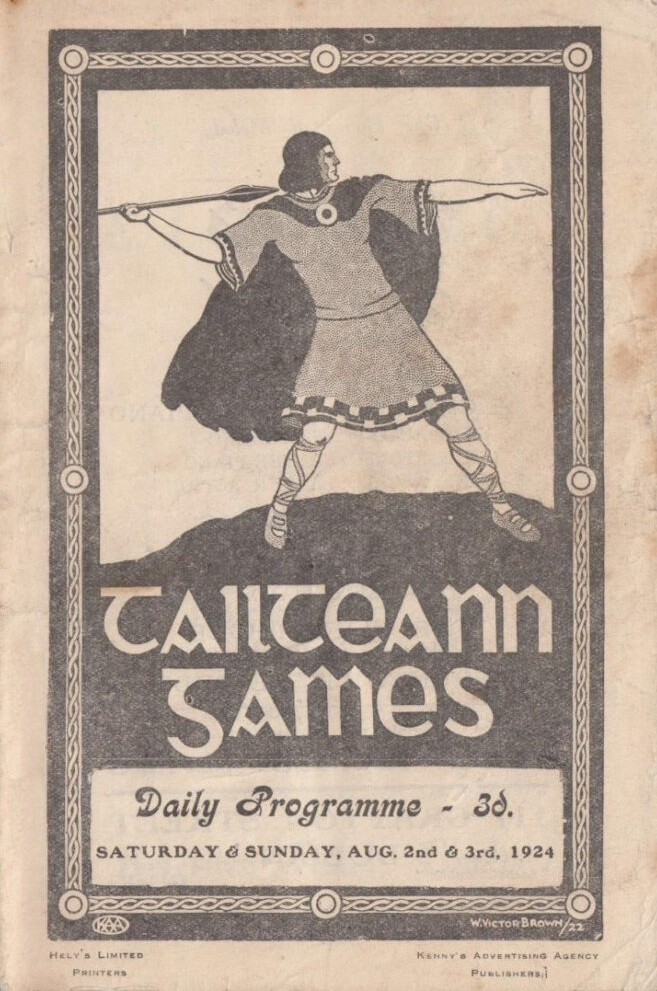
Programme cover of the first modern Tailteann Games held by the Irish Free State in August 1924

The Second Dáil approved a scheme in 1922, and the first Tailteann Games were held by the Irish Free State in 1924. The games were held again in 1928, while the 1932 games were on a smaller scale against a background of the Great Depression and the Anglo-Irish Trade War, and no further games were held.

Jack Fitzsimons suggested reviving the Tailteann Games in a 1985 Seanad Éireann debate on tourism in Ireland.

The Rás Tailteann ("Tailteann race") cycling race was founded in 1953 by the National Cycling Association (NCA). Cycling Ireland still organises the Rás Tailteann annually, but it is usually known as simply "the Rás".

The Irish Secondary Schools Athletic Association organised annual national championships from 1963 under the name "Junior Tailteann Games". Athletics Ireland continues to use the name "Tailteann Games" for its annual schools inter-provincial championships. An inter-Gaeltacht event, that includes other activities, is also known as the "Tailteann Games".

The Gaelic Athletic Association's (GAA) Tailteann Cup, established in 2022, takes its name from the ancient games, as does Páirc Tailteann, a GAA stadium in County Meath.

== Annalistic references ==
The games and fair are mentioned in several Irish annals, including the:

- Annals of Inisfallen: "AI875.1 Kl. Muiredach son of Bran, king of Laigin, harried UíNéill as far as Sliab Fuait, and the Fair of Tailltiu was held".
- Annals of the Four Masters: "M1168.13 On this occasion the fair of Tailltin was celebrated by the King of Ireland [Ruaidhri Ua Conchobhair] and the people of Leath-Chuinn, and their horses and cavalry were spread out on the space extending from Mullach-Aiti to Mullach-Taiten".
- Annals of Ulster: "U1007.10 The assembly of Tailtiu was revived by Mael Sechnaill".

== See also ==
- Ancient Olympic Games, a similar tradition in classical Greece, c. 776 BC – 393 AD
