= Teltown =

Teltown Tailtin
- Townland
- Location in Ireland
- Coordinates: 53°42′01″N 6°46′00″W
- Country: Ireland
- Province: Leinster
- County: County Meath
- Time zone: UTC+0 (WET)
  - Summer (DST): UTC-1 (IST (WEST))

Teltown (Irish: Tailtin) is a townland in County Meath, Ireland. It lies, in a Gaeltacht area, between Oristown and Donaghpatrick, near Kells. The townland, which is approximately 2.5 square kilometres (1 sq mi) in area, is in a civil parish of the same name. As of the 2011 census, the townland of Teltown had a population of 95 people.

== Name and history ==
Teltown (Tailtin) was named for the Irish mythological figure or goddess, Tailtiu. The Tailtin Fair was held there in medieval times as a revival of the ancient Aonach Tailteann, and was revived again as the Tailteann Games for a period in the twentieth century.

While mound structures near Teltown have been asserted in legends in the Book of Invasions to be ancient man-made earthworks 2500 years old, modern archaeological reports of the area suggest they date to at least the Iron Age. Part of one of the mounds in the area called the Knockauns (Irish: na Cnocáin) was partially destroyed by bulldozers for urbanization in 1997.

The 19th-century topographer John O'Donovan stated that loughs near a fort in the area called the Rath Dhubh "have the appearance of being artificial lakes and may have been used when the Olympic Games of Tailteann were celebrated by the Irish". O'Donovan also describes a legend that the shade of Laogaire, the King of Tara, was imprisoned by Saint Patrick until Judgement Day to the east of Rath Dhubh in the Dubhloch.

== Annalistic references ==
The Annals of Inisfallen states that "Muiredach son of Bran, king of Laigin, harried UíNéill as far as Sliab Fuait, and the Fair of Tailtiu was held".
