= Robert Geyer =

Robert Geyer may refer to:

- Robert Geyer (runner) (1899–1982), French middle-distance runner
- Robert Geyer (academic), British researcher
