= Ilmarinen (disambiguation) =

Ilmarinen most commonly refers to Seppo Ilmarinen, an archetypal artificer from Finnish mythology (Kalevala). Other uses of Ilmarinen include:

- Finnish coastal defence ship Ilmarinen
- Finnish icebreaker Ilmarinen
- Ilmarinen Mutual Pension Insurance Company
- the building of the Embassy of Finland to Australia

== See also ==
- Ilmari
- Silmaril
