= Ilmar =

Estonian male given name

- Gender: Male

Origin
- Region of origin: Estonia

Other names
- Related names: Illimar

Ilmar is an Estonian masculine given name and may refer to:

- Ilmar Aluvee (1969–2013), Estonian skier
- Ilmar Kullam (1922–2011), Estonian basketball player and Olympic athlete
- Ilmar Laaban (1921–2000), Estonian poet and publicist
- Ilmar Ojase (born 1973), Estonian swimmer
- Ilmar Öpik (1917–2001), Estonian energetics scientist and academician
- Ilmar Raag (born 1968), Estonian media executive, screenwriter and film director
- Ilmar Raud (1913–1941), Estonian chess master
- Ilmar Reepalu (born 1943), Estonian-born Swedish politician
- Ilmar Sikemäe (1914–1998), Estonian writer
- Ilmar Tamm (born 1972), Estonian Brigadier General
- Ilmar Taska (born 1953), Estonian filmmaker and writer
- Ilmar Tomusk (born 1964), Estonian civil servant and children's writer
- Ilmar Trull (born 1957), Estonian poet, children's writer, illustrator and caricaturist

== Cognates ==
- Ilmari, a similar, Finnish masculine given name
- Ilmārs, a similar, Latvian masculine given name
