= Illimar =

Estonian male given name

- Gender: Male

Origin
- Region of origin: Estonia

Other names
- Related names: Ilmar

Illimar is an Estonian masculine given name. Notable people with the name include:

- Illimar Pärn (born 1988), ski jumper
- Illimar Truverk (born 1967), architect
