= Hedwall =

Hedwall is a surname. Notable people with the surname include:

- Caroline Hedwall (born 1989), Swedish professional golfer
- Jacqueline Hedwall (born 1989), Swedish professional golfer
- Lars Hedwall (1897–1969), Swedish runner

== Other ==
- Stan Hedwall Park, Park in Chehalis, Washington
