= Ilmari =

- Gender: Male

Origin
- Origin: from Ilmarinen in Kalevala
- Meaning: ilma = air
- Region of origin: Finnish

Ilmari is a Finnish male given name. It is a short form of Ilmarinen, a mythological smith in the Kalevala. Notable people with the name include:

- Ilmari Aalto (1891–1934), Finnish painter
- Ilmari Auer (1879–1965), Finnish politician
- Ilmari Juutilainen (1914–1999), Finnish fighter pilot
- Ilmari Hannikainen (1892–1955), Finnish composer
- Ilmari Kianto (1874–1970), Finnish poet
- Ilmari Keinänen (1887–1934), Finnish gymnast and Olympic medalist
- Ilmari Niemeläinen (1910–1951), Finnish diver, architect and Olympic competitor
- Ilmari (Keisuke Ogihara, born 1976), member of the Japanese hip hop group Rip Slyme
- Ilmari Oksanen (1906–1977), Finnish footballer
- Ilmari Pakarinen (1910–1987), Finnish gymnast and Olympic medalist
- Ilmari Pernaja (1892–1963), Finnish gymnast and Olympic medalist
- Ilmari Pitkänen (born 1990), Finnish ice hockey player
- Ilmari Rahm (1888–1939), Finnish chess player
- Ilmari Saarelainen (born 1944) Finnish actor
- Ilmari Salminen (1902–1986), Finnish track and field athlete and Olympic medalist
- Ilmari Salomies (1893–1973), Finnish former archbishop of Turku, and the spiritual head of the Evangelical Lutheran Church of Finland
- Ilmari Solin (1905–1976), Finnish chess player
- Ilmari Susiluoto (1947–2016), Finnish political scientist, professor and political advisor
- Ilmari Taipale (1928–2008), Finnish long-distance runner and Olympic competitor
- Ilmari Tapiovaara (1914–1999), Finnish designer
- Ilmari Turja (1901-1998), Finnish journalist and playwright
- Ilmari Unho (1906−1961), Finnish actor, film director and screenwriter
- Ilmari Vartia (1914–1951), Finnish fencer and Olympic competitor
- Ilmari Vesamaa (1893–1973), track and field athlete and Olympic competitor
- Artturi Ilmari Virtanen (1895–1973), Finnish chemist, Nobel Prize recipient

== Cognates ==
- Ilmar, a similar, Estonian masculine given name
- Ilmārs, a similar, Latvian masculine given name
