= Agabus (disambiguation) =

Agabus was an early follower of Christianity. Agabus may also refer to:

- Agabus (beetle), genus of beetles
- Mattias Agabus (born 1977), Estonian architect
