= Patrick Flynn (athlete) =

Irish American athlete

Olympic medal record

Men's athletics

Representing the United States
Silver medal – second place	1920 Antwerp	3000 m steeplechase

Patrick (a.k.a. Pat, Patsy, Paddy) J. Flynn was an accomplished Irish American athlete, an Olympic silver medalist and a war veteran.

== Family and early life ==
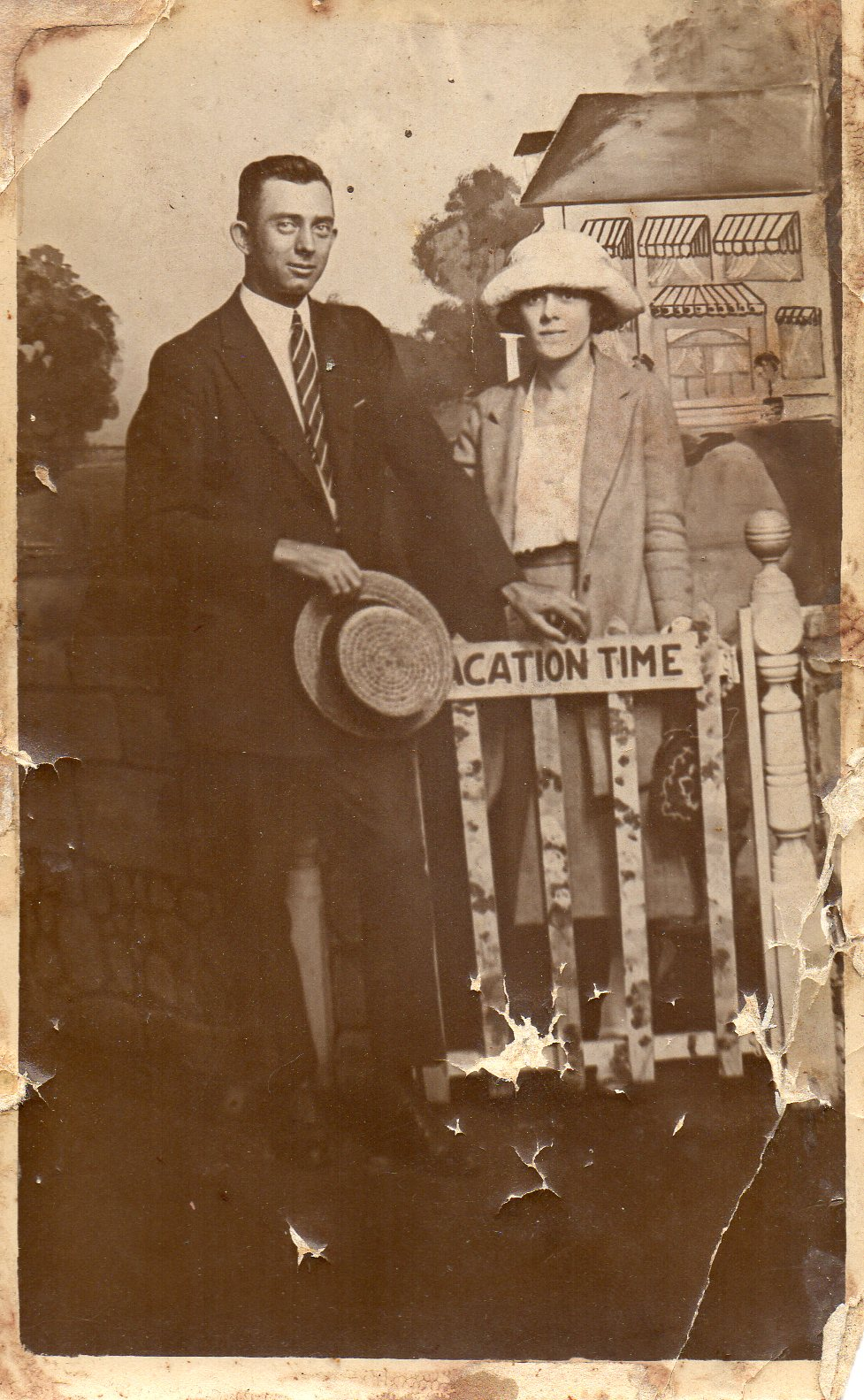
Flynn on vacation with his wife Florence

Patrick J. Flynn was born on 17 December 1894 in County Cork, Ireland. He was the eldest child of farmers Patrick and Ellen Flynn, and had three brothers and one sister. According to the 1901 census the Flynn family were living in Knocknagappul but they had moved to Cloghane in Kildara, Ballinadee by 1911.

In his early years Flynn showed enormous talent under the tutelage of local athlete Bob Hales, and began competing in athletics in 1912. The following year was an eventful one for 19-year-old Flynn. That May he became an Irish champion after winning the Irish Four Mile Championship, and he represented Ireland in an international championship against Scotland in July. His success in the Four Mile category helped Ireland secure the championship title that year.

== Emigration to the USA ==
In the autumn of 1913 Flynn emigrated to America from Queenstown (Cobh) in Cork. In New York City he soon found work as a shipping clerk and unsurprisingly began competing in athletics. In 1916 he joined the Paulist Athletic Club, which is a member of the Irish American Athletic Club. It was during this time that he came up against Olympic Champion Hans Kolehmainen in the 5,000 metres where he was beaten by less than a yard. This race, despite Flynn's defeat, is noteworthy as the winning time was to set a new world record of 14:33:6.

During the next two years Flynn raced for the Irish American AC against the best in America, and was unbeaten. If not for the intervention of World War One, he would have certainly been selected to represent the USA in the 1916 Olympic Games, which would have taken place in Berlin.

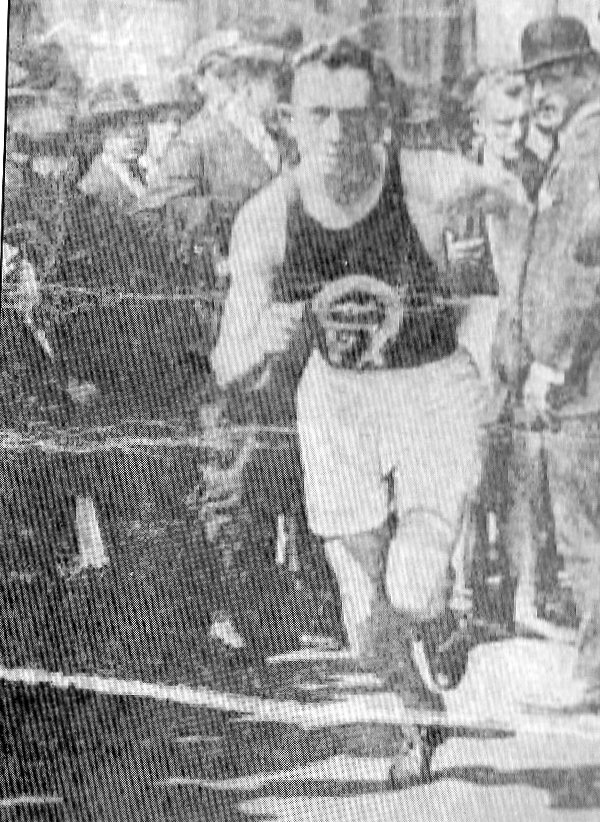
Flynn running in New York

== World War I ==
Following the outbreak of the war, Flynn shelved his dreams of an Olympic medal and enlisted in the 165th Infantry Regiment in the spring of 1916; he would become a Sergeant. In July 1918 whilst fighting the Germans in France he was shot in his left arm during an act of heroism:

While Ryan had to lie in a depression and try to keep up the spirits of his followers by calling to them. When his voice failed him, Paddy Flynn, a clean-cut young Irish athlete, came and lay alongside him and coached the team like a captain on the base lines. As he raised his head to call he was hit on the cheek, but he kept on urging resistance until he was finally wounded severely.

— Fr. Francis Duffy's diary

On the Ourcq River, the 69th put up what has been called one of the greatest fights of that terrible war when it forced a crossing without artillery support and, fighting alone on the enemy's side of the river, with its flanks unsupported, engaged a Prussian Guards Division and forced it to retire. It was an incredible feat of arms...

— Kenneth H. Powers

When news of Flynn's injury made it back to the US, The New York Times published a short article about him. That August, he was awarded a Purple Heart for his bravery. The Great War ended in November 1918 and four months later the 165th arrived in New York. No regiment saw more action — 180 days of combat — with 644 killed and nearly 2,900 wounded. They were greeted as returning heroes and honoured with a parade up Fifth Avenue.

== 1920 Antwerp Olympics ==
Flynn recovered from his injury and returned to athletics the following year. His coach at the Paulist Athletics Club persuaded him to try the steeplechase rather than his beloved long distance. Soon afterwards he came second in the two mile steeplechase (3,200m) to defending champion Michael Devaney. While trying out for the US Olympic Team in 1920, he won the Amateur Athletic Union (AAU) title and set a new US record of 9:58.2 for the 3000 m steeplechase. Unsurprisingly he qualified for the US Olympic team bound for Belgium in both the 5,000m and 10,000m. He was also entered in the 3,000m steeplechase, an event at which he was still a novice. The 1920 Antwerp Olympics were the first games to include the 3,000m steeplechase, which was run on a grass course just inside the cinder track.

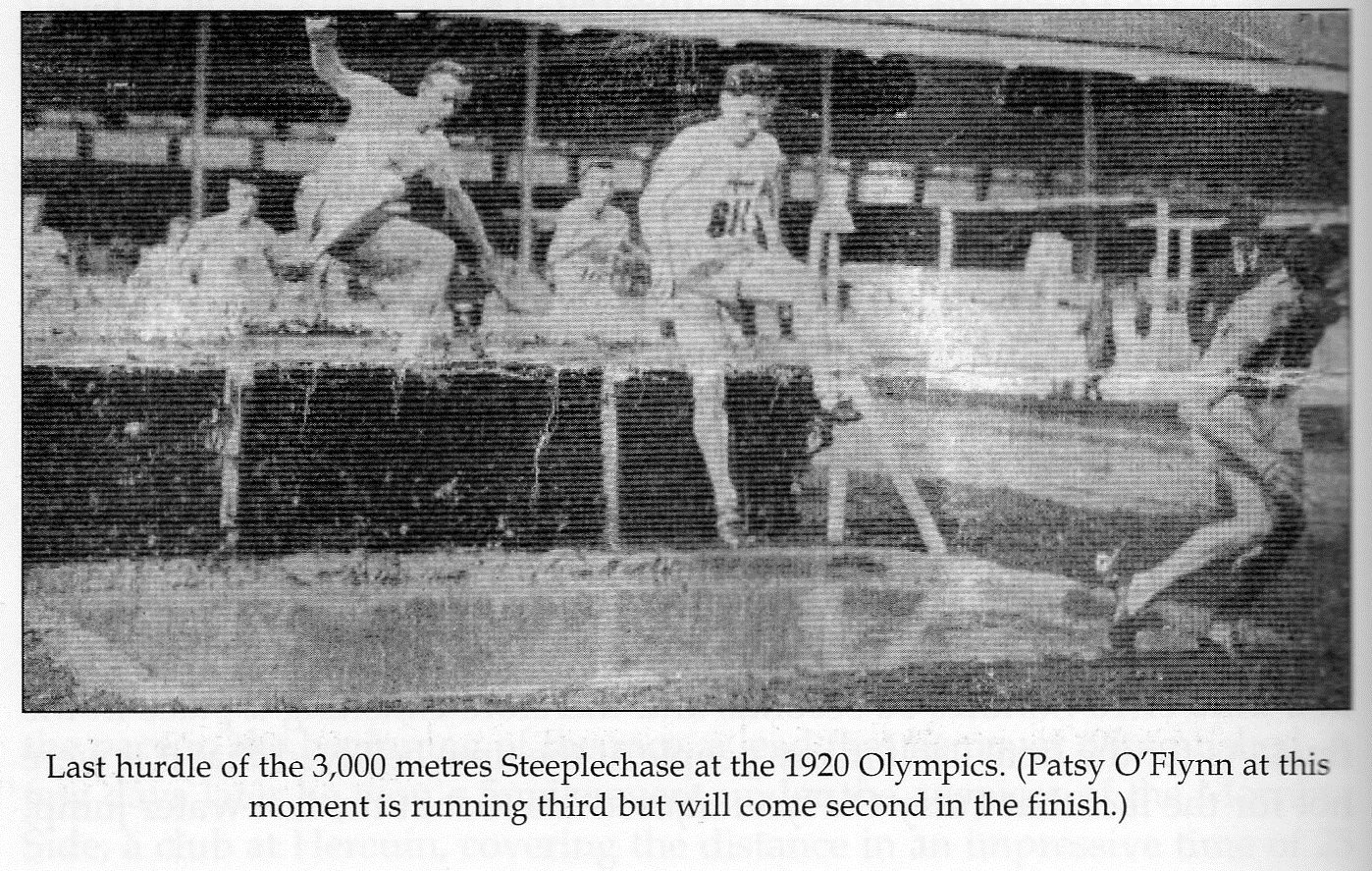
3,000m steeplechase, 1920 Olympics, Antwerp

Flynn won his qualifying heat comfortably, but the final didn't go as smoothly. He fell at one of the water jumps and was beaten to the tape by the favourite Percy Hodge (GBR); Flynn won the silver medal. There is little doubt that he would have been in contention for the gold had he not fallen. He also competed in the men's cross-country, individual; and men's cross-country, team, placing 9th and 4th respectively.

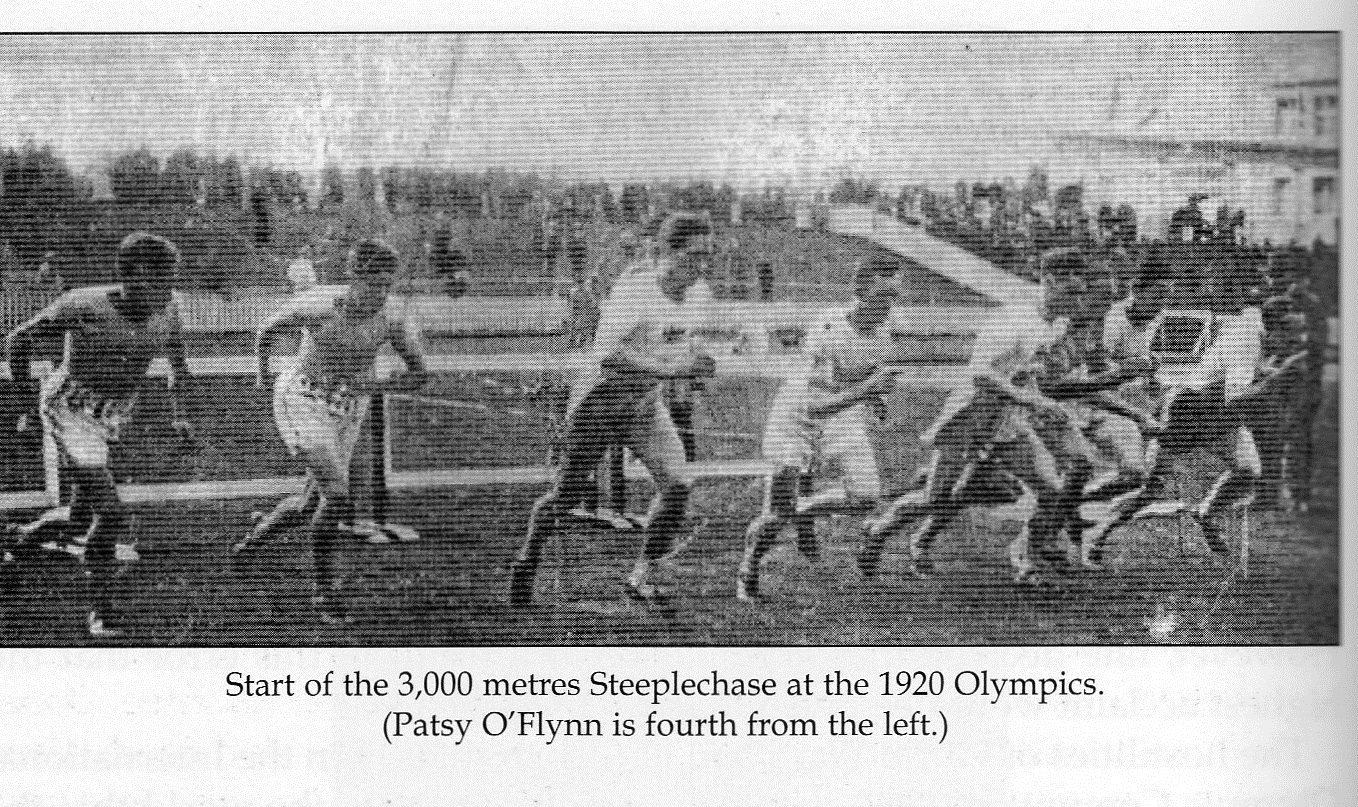
3,000m steeplechase, 1920 Olympics, Antwerp

== Later years ==
Flynn continued to run following his return from Antwerp, but appears to have retired from competitive running after 1925.

He married Florence in 1924. According to the 1930 census they lived on the Upper West Side Manhattan in close proximity to US Customs, where Flynn's last known employment was as a customs clerk. At the age of 47 he applied for service in World War II, but his application was refused.

It is unknown how he lived out his final years. Patsy Flynn died on 5 January 1969 at the age of 74. He is buried in Long Island National Cemetery in Farmingdale, New York alongside his wife Florence.

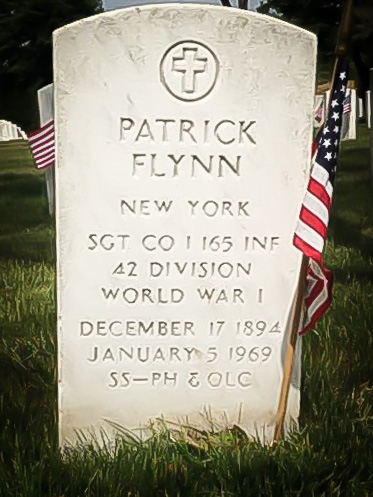

== Celebrating his memory ==
Though his athletic accomplishments occurred nearly a century ago, Flynn's home town of Ballinadee in West Cork has not forgotten him and continues to celebrate his memory. In 1998 the local community and his relatives erected a monument in the quaint village which was opened by his surviving niece Ellen Hunt.

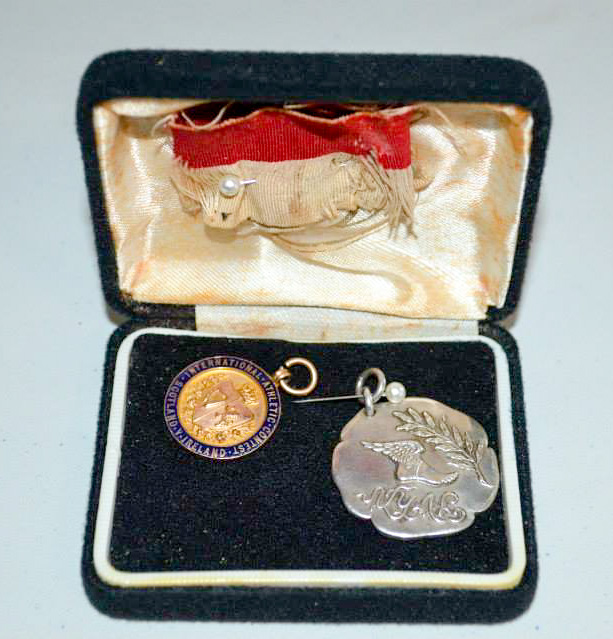
Eire vs Scotland international medal

Flynn's achievements were acknowledged again on 7 June 2015 in the inaugural Knocknacurra 7 Mile Road Race organised by Kilmacsimon Swimming and Rowing Club. This memorable occasion celebrated the achievements of three local athletes of the Knocknacurra townland who had international success: Patsy O'Flynn, Bob Hales (national and international athlete 1911-1912 and Flynn's early mentor) and Bill Nolan (Ireland v Scotland International 1 Mile Champion 1931). A number of Flynn's descendants competed in this memorial race, ensuring that his legacy lives on in future generations.
