= Öpik =

Family name

Öpik is an Estonian surname. Notable people with the surname include:

- Armin Öpik (1898–1983), Estonian/Australian paleontologist
- Ernst Öpik (1893–1985), Estonian astronomer
  - Öpik-Oort cloud, hypothesized spherical cloud of comets
  - 2099 Öpik, asteroid, named after Ernst Öpik
  - Öpik, crater on Phobos, also named after Ernst Öpik
- Ilmar Öpik (1917–2001), Estonian energetics scientist and academic
- Lembit Öpik (born 1965), British politician
