= Ilmārs =

Male given name

- Gender: Male

Origin
- Region of origin: Latvia

Ilmārs is a Latvian masculine given name and may refer to:

- Ilmārs Bricis (born 1970), biathlete
- Ilmārs Liepiņš (1947–2007), footballer
- Ilmārs Rimšēvičs (born 1965), economist
- Ilmārs Poikāns (born 1978), artificial intelligence researcher
- Ilmārs Starostīts (born 1979), chess Grandmaster
- Ilmārs Verpakovskis (1958–2022), footballer

== Cognates ==
- Ilmar, a similar Estonian masculine given name
- Ilmari, a similar Finnish masculine given name
