= Frédéric Langrenay =

French middle-distance runner

Personal information
- Nationality: French
- Born: 24 September 1899 Rouen, France
- Died: 16 March 1985 (aged 85) Paris, France
- Height: 173 cm (5 ft 8 in)

Sport
- Sport: Middle-distance running
- Event: Steeplechase

Frédéric Langrenay (24 September 1899 – 16 March 1985) was a French middle-distance runner. He competed in the men's 3000 metres steeplechase at the 1920 Summer Olympics.
