= Oskari Rissanen =

Finnish distance runner

Oskari ("Olavi") Rissanen (March 21, 1893 – February 11, 1957) was a Finnish track and field athlete who competed in the 1920 Summer Olympics. He was born in Kuopion maalaiskunta, Northern Savonia (now part of Kuopio) and died in Kuopio. In 1920 he qualified for the final of the 3000 metre steeplechase event but did not compete in the race.
