= Georges Guillon =

French middle-distance runner

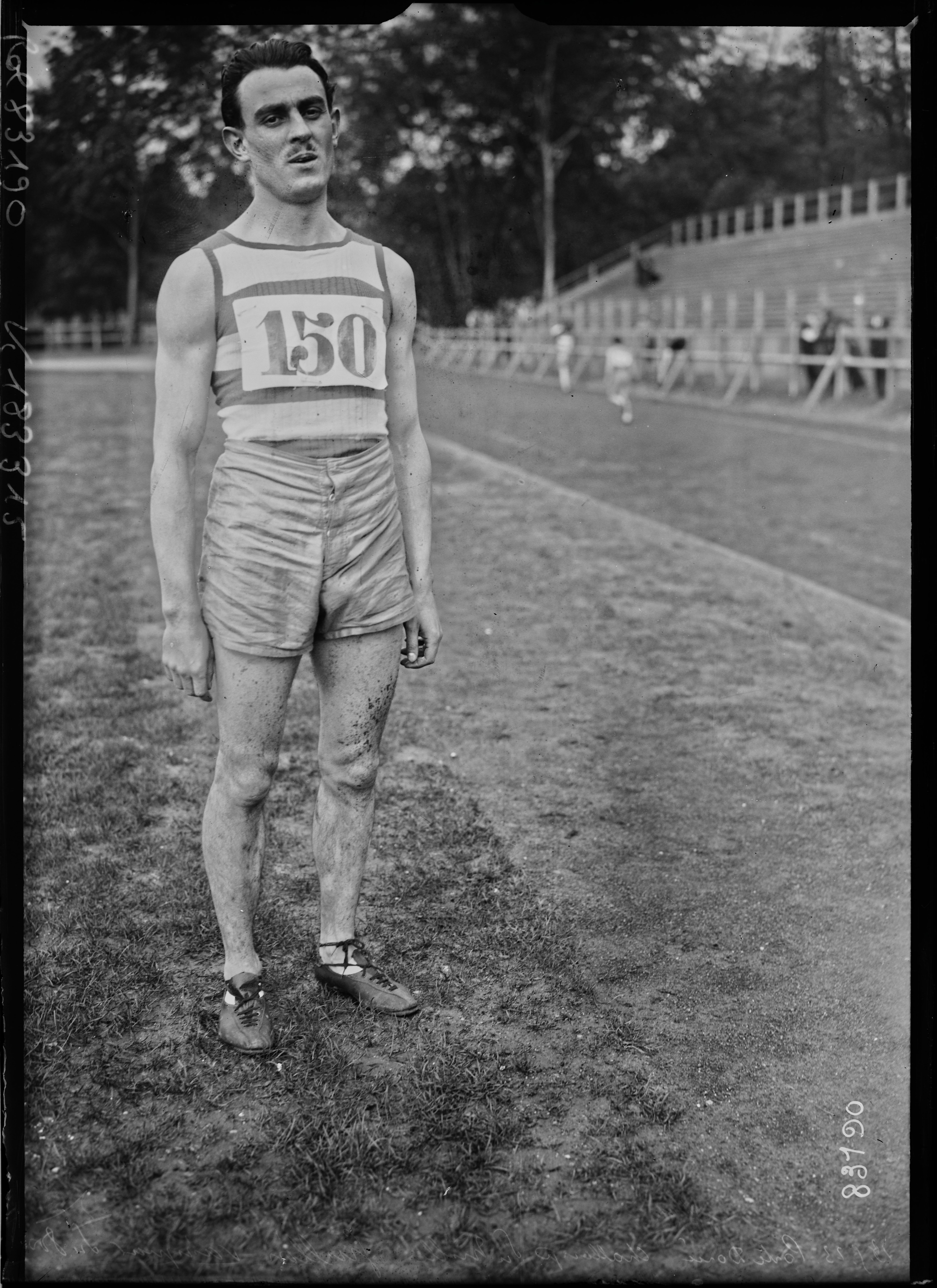
- Guillon in 1923

Personal information
- Nationality: French
- Born: 10 September 1899 Levallois-Perret, France
- Died: 13 April 1978 (aged 78) Tournus, France

Sport
- Sport: Middle-distance running
- Event: Steeplechase

Georges Guillon (10 September 1899 – 13 April 1978) was a French middle-distance runner. He competed in the men's 3000 metres steeplechase at the 1920 Summer Olympics.
