= Albert Hulsebosch =

American track and field athlete

Albert Joseph Hulsebosch (April 7, 1897 – January 5, 1982) was an American track and field athlete who competed in the 1920 Summer Olympics. He was born in Bergenfield, New Jersey, and died in South Chatham, Massachusetts. In 1920, he finished sixth in the 3000 metre steeplechase event.
