= Oil Shale (journal) =

Scientific journal published in Estonia

- Discipline: Petrology (specifically oil shale and related topics)
- Language: English
- Edited by: Meelika Nõmme

Publication details
- History: 1984-present
- Publisher: Estonian Academy Publishers (Estonia)
- Frequency: Quarterly
- Open access: Yes

Standard abbreviations
- ISO 4: Oil Shale

Indexing
- CODEN: OSIHA3
- ISSN: 0208-189X (print); 1736-7492 (web)
- OCLC no.: 243596398

Links
- Journal homepage

Oil Shale is a quarterly peer-reviewed scientific journal covering research in petrology, especially concerning oil shale. The journal covers geology, mining, formation, composition, methods of processing, combustion, economics, and environmental protection related to oil shale. It is abstracted and indexed in the Science Citation Index. The editor-in-chief is Andres Siirde and executive editor is Meelika Nõmme.

== History ==
The plan for publishing an oil shale journal arose in 1983 in the Estonian Academy of Sciences and the journal was established in 1984 as the journal of the Academy of Sciences of the USSR and the Estonian Academy of Sciences. Publishing was financed by the Academy of Sciences of the USSR and administered by the Institute of Chemistry of the Estonian Academy of Sciences. It was published by the publishing house Perioodika in Tallinn.

At first, the journal was published in Russian under the name Горючие Сланцы (translit. Goryutchie Slantsy). However, there was the permission from Soviet authorities to use the English-written subtitle Oil Shale and to add English summaries to Russian papers. The first editor-in-chief was Ilmar Öpik. The financing by the Academy of Sciences of the USSR ended in the beginning of 1990s after Estonia regained independence. As a result, a new editorial board was selected, which decided to transform the journal into an international English-language journal. The publishing was mainly sponsored by oil shale companies and private persons.

In 1994, the journal was indexed in ISI products and since then published by the Estonian Academy Publishers. Since 1998, the publishing is financed through Estonia's state budget.
