= Ernesto Ambrosini =

Italian athlete (1894–1951)

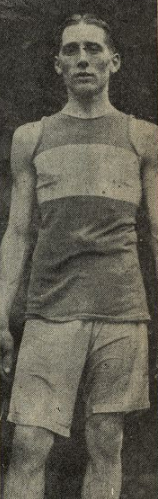
- Ernesto Ambrosini at the Italian Championships in Athletics 1922 in Busto Arsizio.

Personal information
- Nationality: Italian
- Born: 29 September 1894 Monza, Italy
- Died: 4 November 1951 (aged 57) Monza, Italy

Sport
- Country: Italy
- Sport: Athletics
- Event: Middle distance running
- Club: Brescia Calcio

Achievements and titles
- Personal bests: 800 m: 1:59.0 (1920); 3000 m steeplechase: 9:36.6 (1923)
Medal record
Summer Olympics
Bronze medal – third place	1920 Antwerp	3000 m steeplechase

Ernesto Ambrosini (29 September 1894 – 4 November 1951) was an Italian athlete who competed mainly in the 3000 metres steeplechase. He competed for Italy in the 1920 Summer Olympics held in Antwerp, Belgium in the 3000 metre steeple chase where he won the bronze medal.

== World record ==
- 3000 metres steeplechase: 9.36.6 (Paris, France 9 June 1923)

== National titles ==
Ernesto Ambrosini has won 10 times the individual national championship.

- 1 win in 800 metres (1920)
- 2 wins in 1500 metres (1920, 1921)
- 2 wins in 5000 metres (1922, 1923)
- 3 wins in 1200 metres steeplechase (1920, 1921, 1922)
- 1 win in 3000 metres steeplechase (1923)
- 1 win in Cross country running (1922)

== See also ==
- FIDAL Hall of Fame
