= Percy Hodge =

British athlete (1890–1967)

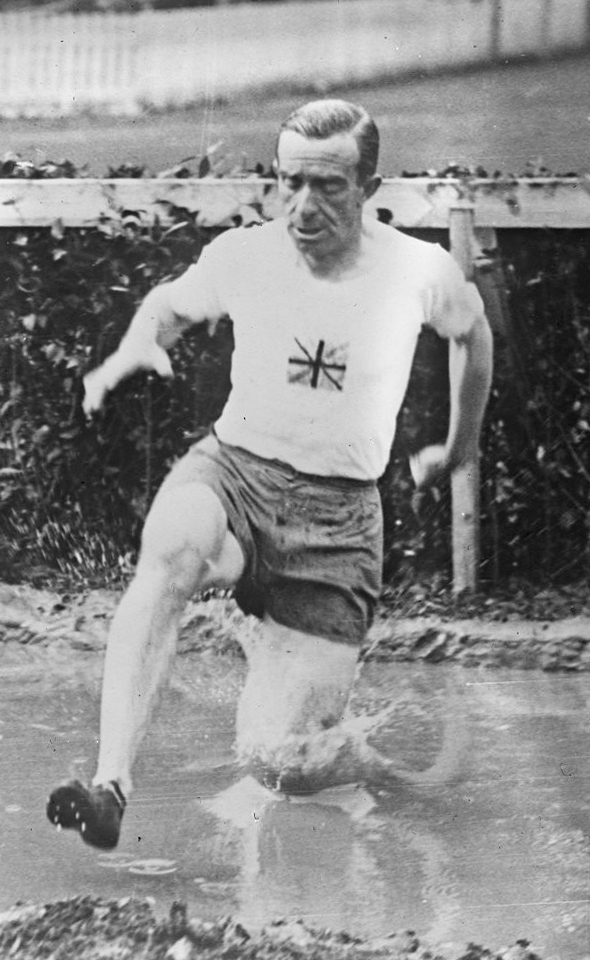
- Hodge at the 1920 Olympics

Personal information
- Born: 26 December 1890 Saint Sampson, Guernsey
- Died: 27 December 1967 (aged 77) Bexhill-on-Sea, England

Sport
- Sport: Athletics
- Event: Steeplechase
- Club: Surrey AC

Achievements and titles
- Personal bests: 440 yd – 50.2 (1917); 800 m – 1:58.5e (1921); Mile – 4:32.6 (1916); 3000 mS – 10:00.4 (1920)
Medal record
Representing Great Britain
Olympic Games
Gold medal – first place	1920 Antwerp	3000 m steeplechase

Percy Hodge (26 December 1890 – 27 December 1967) was a British athlete, winner of the 3000 m steeplechase at the 1920 Summer Olympics.

== Career ==
Hodge was born in Guernsey, but then moved to Weymouth and Bournemouth, finally settling in Bexhill-on-Sea. He became the National 2 miles steeplechase champion after winning the AAA Championships title at the 1919 AAA Championships.

The following year in 1920, he retained his AAA title despite his shoe falling off in the second lap causing him to stop and lose some 100 yards, yet he won the race by a margin of 75 yards. He also finished ninth at the International Cross Country Championships and helped his team to win first place in 1920. Shortly after, he was selected for the Olympic Games. The 1920 Summer Olympics were the first to include a (now common) 3000 m steeplechase. This was run on a grass course, unlike later competitions. Percy Hodge was the favourite, easily winning his heat and outrunning the rest of the field. He won the final in a time of 10:00.4, some 100 m ahead of second-placed Patrick Flynn from the United States. Hodge also ran in the heats of the 3000 m team event, in which Great Britain won a silver medal.

Hodge retained his AAA title again in 1921 and 1923.

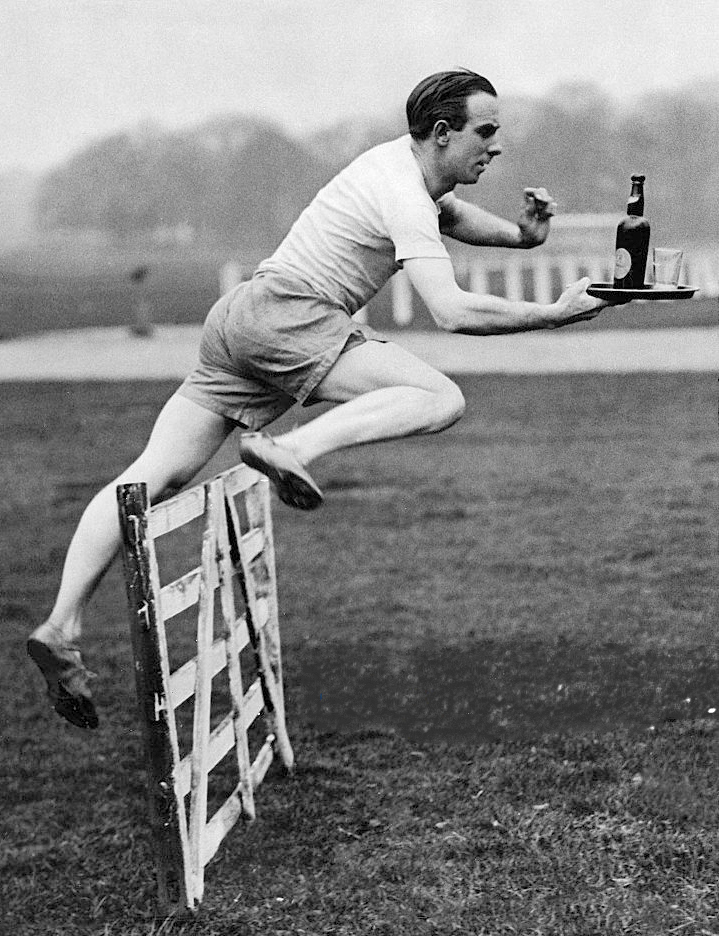
Hodge training in hurdles
