= Athletics at the 1920 Summer Olympics – Men's 3000 metres steeplechase =

Men's 3000 metres steeplechase at the Games of the VII Olympiad
- Venue: Olympisch Stadion
- Dates: August 18–20, 1920
- Competitors: 16 from 6 nations

Medalists
1st place, gold medalist(s)		Percy Hodge	Great Britain
2nd place, silver medalist(s)		Patrick Flynn	United States
3rd place, bronze medalist(s)		Ernesto Ambrosini	Italy

The men's 3000 metres steeplechase event was part of the track and field athletics programme at the 1920 Summer Olympics. The competition was held on Wednesday, August 18, 1920, and on Friday, August 20, 1920. Sixteen runners from six nations competed.

== Records ==
These were the standing world and Olympic records (in minutes) prior to the 1920 Summer Olympics.

World record	9:49.8(*)	(Sweden) Jonas Ternström	Malmö (SWE)	July 4, 1914
Olympic record	10:47.8(**)	(United Kingdom) Arthur Russell	London (GBR)	July 22, 1908

(*) unofficial (**) Race held over 3200 metres; equivalent time for 3000 metres is 10:08.0.

Michael Devaney won the first ever Olympic 3000 metre steeplechase race in 10:23.0. In the third heat, Percy Hodge set a new record with 10:17.4. In the final, Hodge set a new Olympic record with 10:00.4 minutes.

== Results ==
=== Semifinals ===
Semifinal 1

Place	Athlete	Time	Qual.
1	Michael Devaney (USA)	10:23.0	Q OR
2	Ernesto Ambrosini (ITA)	10:33.6	Q
3	Oskari Rissanen (FIN)	11:07.5	Q
4	Edmond Brossard (FRA)		

Semifinal 2

Place	Athlete	Time	Qual.
1	Patrick Flynn (USA)	10:36.0	Q
2	Lars Hedwall (SWE)	10:43.5	Q
3	Ray Watson (USA)	10:49.0	Q
4	Robert Geyer (FRA)	11:11.9	

Semifinal 3

Place	Athlete	Time	Qual.
1	Percy Hodge (GBR)	10:17.4	Q OR
2	Gustaf Mattsson (SWE)	10:22.6	Q
3	Albert Hulsebosch (USA)	10:26.8	Q
4	Ilmari Vesamaa (FIN)	10:32.2	
5	Frédéric Langrenay (FRA)	10:39.8	
6	Georges Guillon (FRA)	10:44.3	
—	Carlo Martinenghi (ITA)	DNF	
—	Josef Holsner (SWE)	DNF	

=== Final ===
The final was held on Friday, August 20, 1920.

Place	Athlete	Time
1	Percy Hodge (GBR)	10:00.4 OR
2	Patrick Flynn (USA)	10:21.1
3	Ernesto Ambrosini (ITA)	10:32.0
4	Gustaf Mattsson (SWE)	10:32.1
5	Michael Devaney (USA)	10:34.3
6	Albert Hulsebosch (USA)	10:37.7
7	Lars Hedwall (SWE)	10:42.2
8	Ray Watson (USA)	10:50.3
—	Oskari Rissanen (FIN)	DNS

== Sources ==
- Belgium Olympic Committee (1957). Olympic Games Antwerp 1920: Official Report (in French).
- Wudarski, Pawel (1999). "Wyniki Igrzysk Olimpijskich" (in Polish).
