= Eero Endjärv =

Estonian architect (born 1973)

Eero Endjärv (born 24 January 1973 in Tallinn) is an Estonian architect.

From 1988 to 1991, he studied in the 43rd Secondary School of Tallinn. From 1991 to 1995, he studied in the Tallinn Technical University. From 1995, he studied in the Estonian Academy of Arts in the department of architecture and city planning. He graduated from the academy in 2001.

Since 2001, Endjärv has worked in the architectural bureau Agabus, Endjärv & Truverk OÜ as an architect and partner. Since 2009, he has also been active in the Allianss Arhitektid OÜ architectural bureau.

The most notable works by Endjärv are the villa in Otepää in southern Estonia, the new building of the University of Tallinn, the Viimsi School and the library of the Tallinn Technical University.

Endjärv is a member of the Union of Estonian Architects.

== Works ==
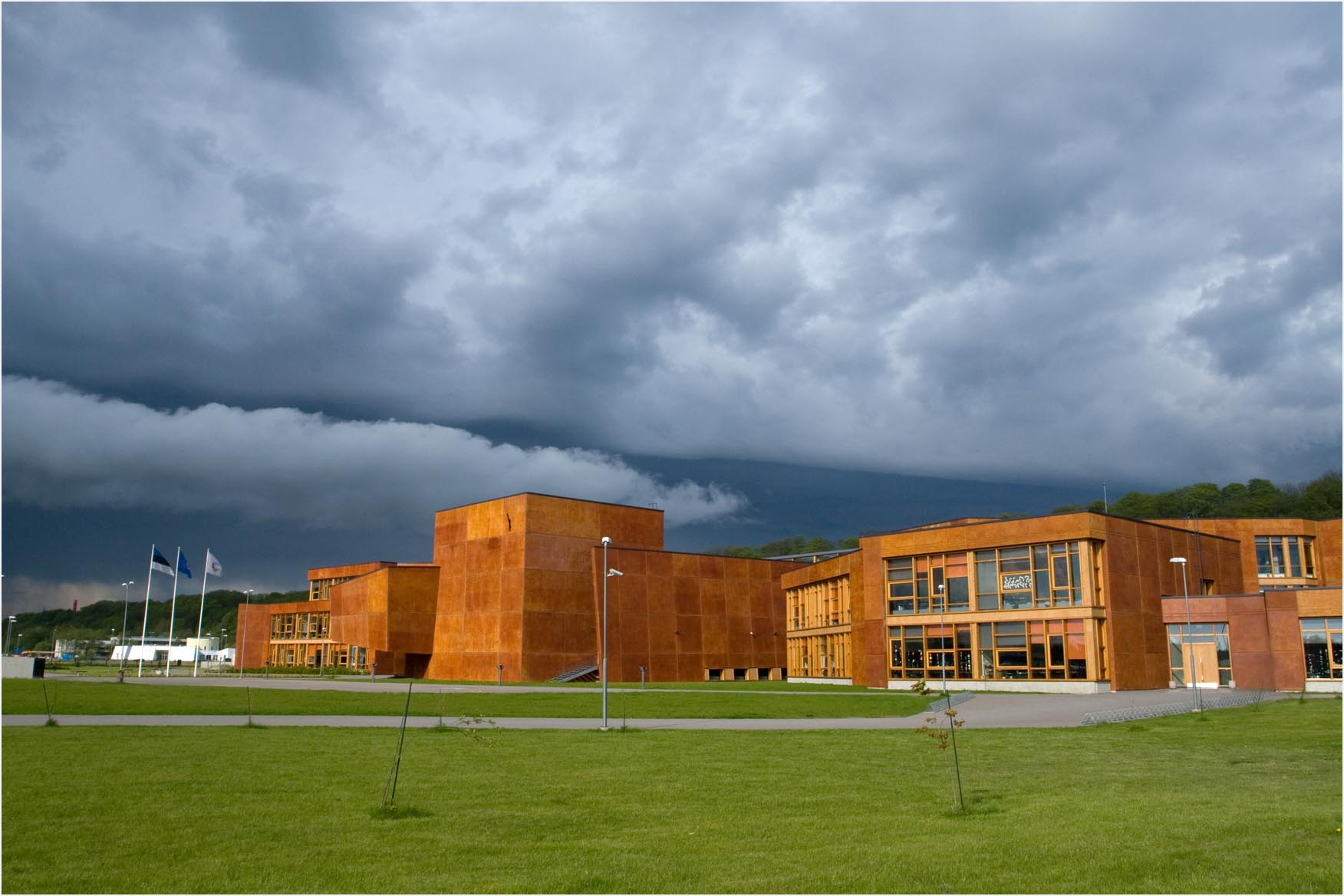
Viimsi School in Haabneeme

- Apartment buildings in Pirita, 2003 (with Mattias Agabus, Illimar Truverk)
- Villa in Southern Estonia, 2004 (with Mattias Agabus, Illimar Truverk)
- Apartment building in Nõmme, 2005 (with Mattias Agabus, Raul Järg, Illimar Truverk)
- Apartment building on Kreutzwaldi street in Tallinn, 2005 (with Mattias Agabus, Illimar Truverk)
- Apartment building in Viimsi, 2006 (with Mattias Agabus, Raul Järg, Illimar Truverkiga)
- New building of the Tallinn University, 2006 (with Mattias Agabus, Illimar Truverk, Raul Järgi, Priit Pent)
- Viimsi School, 2006 (with Mattias Agabus, Illimar Truverk, Priit Pent, Raul Järg)
- New library of the Tallinn Technical University, 2009 (with Mattias Agabus, Illimar Truverk)

== Competitions ==
- New building of the Tallinn University, 2003, 1st prize
- Library of the Tallinn Technical University, 2006, 1st prize

== See also ==
- List of Estonian architects
