= Michael Devaney (runner) =

American track and field athlete

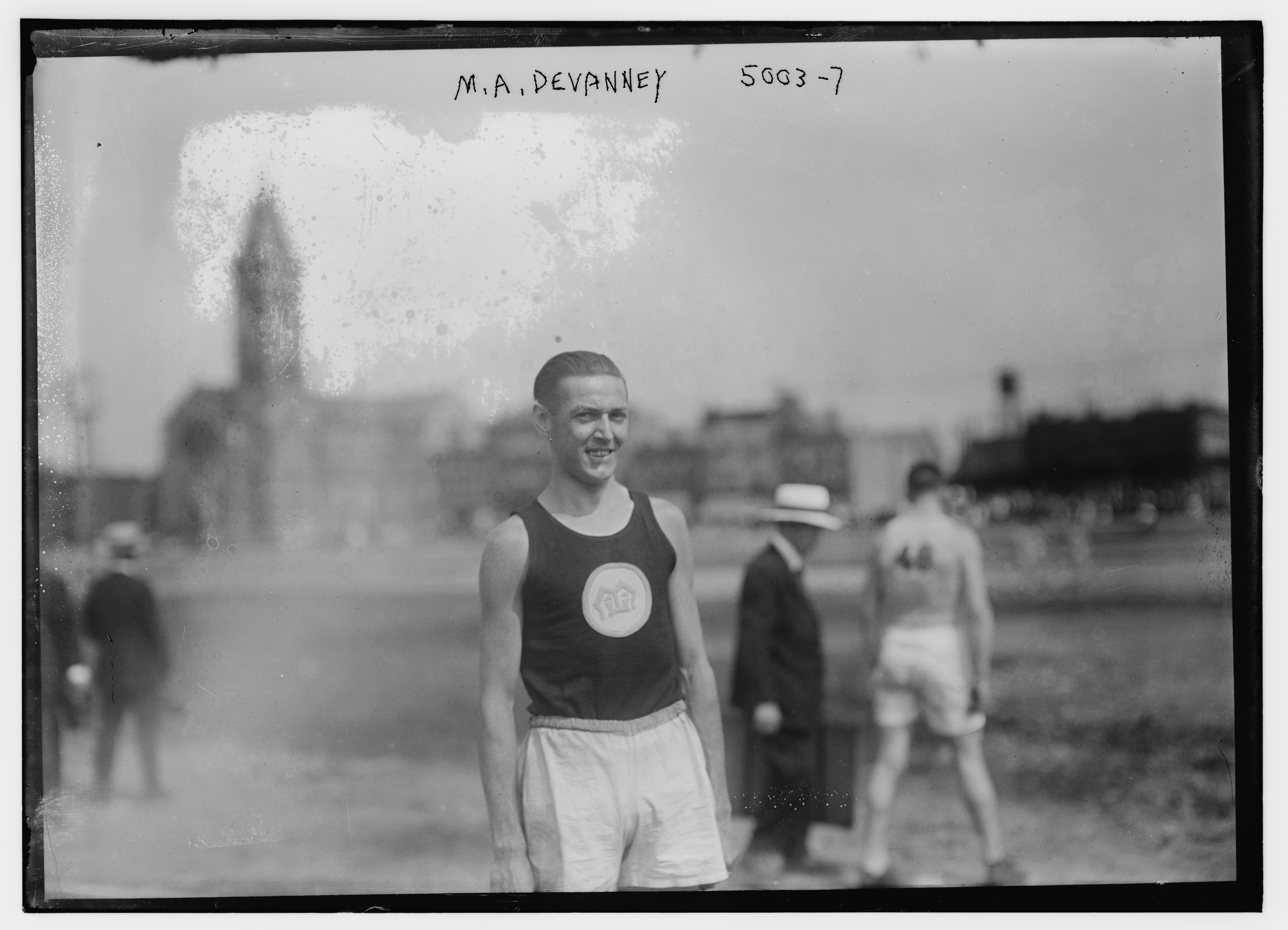

Michael Aloysius Devaney (June 6, 1891 – January 25, 1967) was an American track and field athlete who competed in the 1920 Summer Olympics and in the 1924 Summer Olympics. He was born and died in Belleville, New Jersey.

In 1920 he finished fifth in the 3000 metre steeplechase competition. He was also a member of the American team which won the gold medal in the 3000 metre team race. Four years later he finished seventh in the 3000 metre steeplechase event.
