= Ilmari Vesamaa =

Finnish long-distance runner

Ilmari Vesamaa (4 December 1893, Artjärvi – 24 January 1973) was a Finnish track and field athlete who competed in the 1920 Summer Olympics. In 1920, he was eliminated in the semifinals of the 3000 metre steeplechase competition as well as of the 5000 metres event. He finished 14th in the individual cross country event. Because he was not one of the top three performers on the Finnish team, he was not awarded a gold medal in the team cross country competition.
