= Lars Hedwall =

Swedish runner (1897–1969)

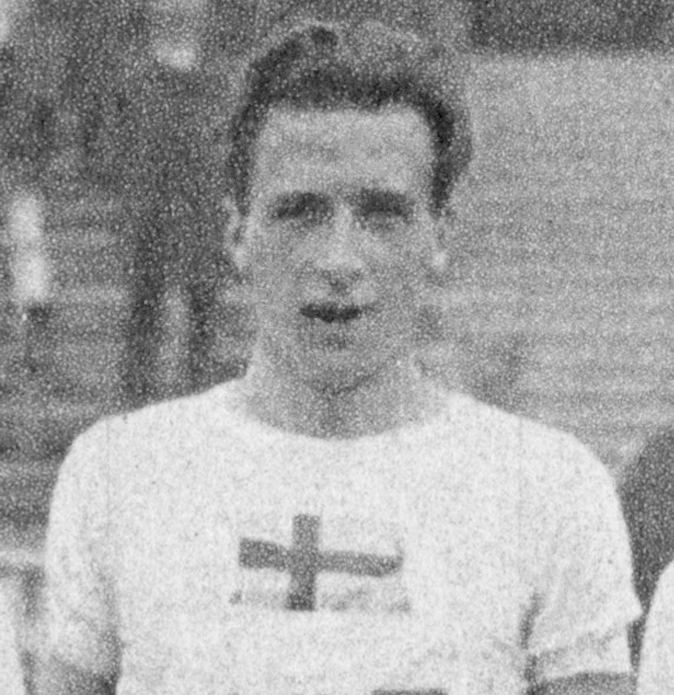

Personal information
- Born: 10 February 1897 Skog, Sweden
- Died: 29 July 1969 (aged 72) Stockholm, Sweden
- Height: 176 cm (5 ft 9 in)
- Weight: 67 kg (148 lb)

Sport
- Sport: Athletics
- Events: 5000 m, cross country
- Club: GSGF, Gävle

Achievements and titles
- Personal best: 5000 m – 15:26.8 (1920)

Lars Eugen Hedwall (10 February 1897 – 29 July 1969) was a Swedish male runner who competed in the 1920 Summer Olympics. He finished seventh in the 3000 metre steeplechase and 24th in the individual cross country event. Although he was a member of the bronze medal-winning Swedish cross country team, he did not receive a medal because only three best runners from each team were honored, while Hedwall was fifth.
