= Illimar Truverk =

Estonian architect

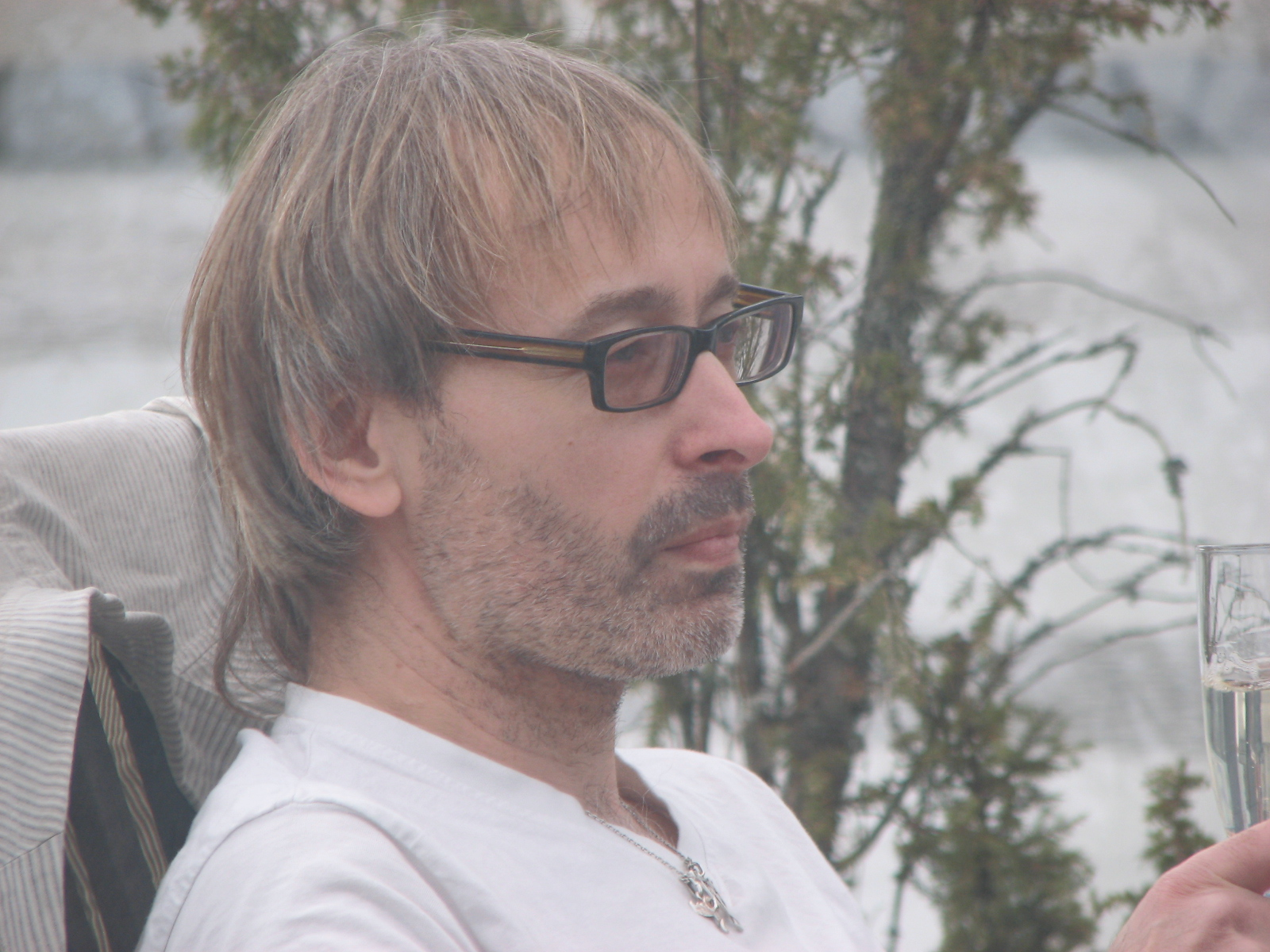
Illimar Truverk in 2011

Illimar Truverk (born March 20, 1967, in Tallinn) is an Estonian architect.

Truverk studied at the Estonian Academy of Arts in the department of architecture and city planning, graduating in 2001. Since then he has worked for the architectural bureau Agabus, Endjärv & Truverk OÜ. Truverk has also been active in the architectural bureau Allianss Arhitektid OÜ beginning in 2009.

His notable works include the Viimsi School, the new building of the Tallinn University, the villa in Otepää and the new library of the Tallinn Technical University. Truverk is a member of the Union of Estonian Architects.

== Works ==
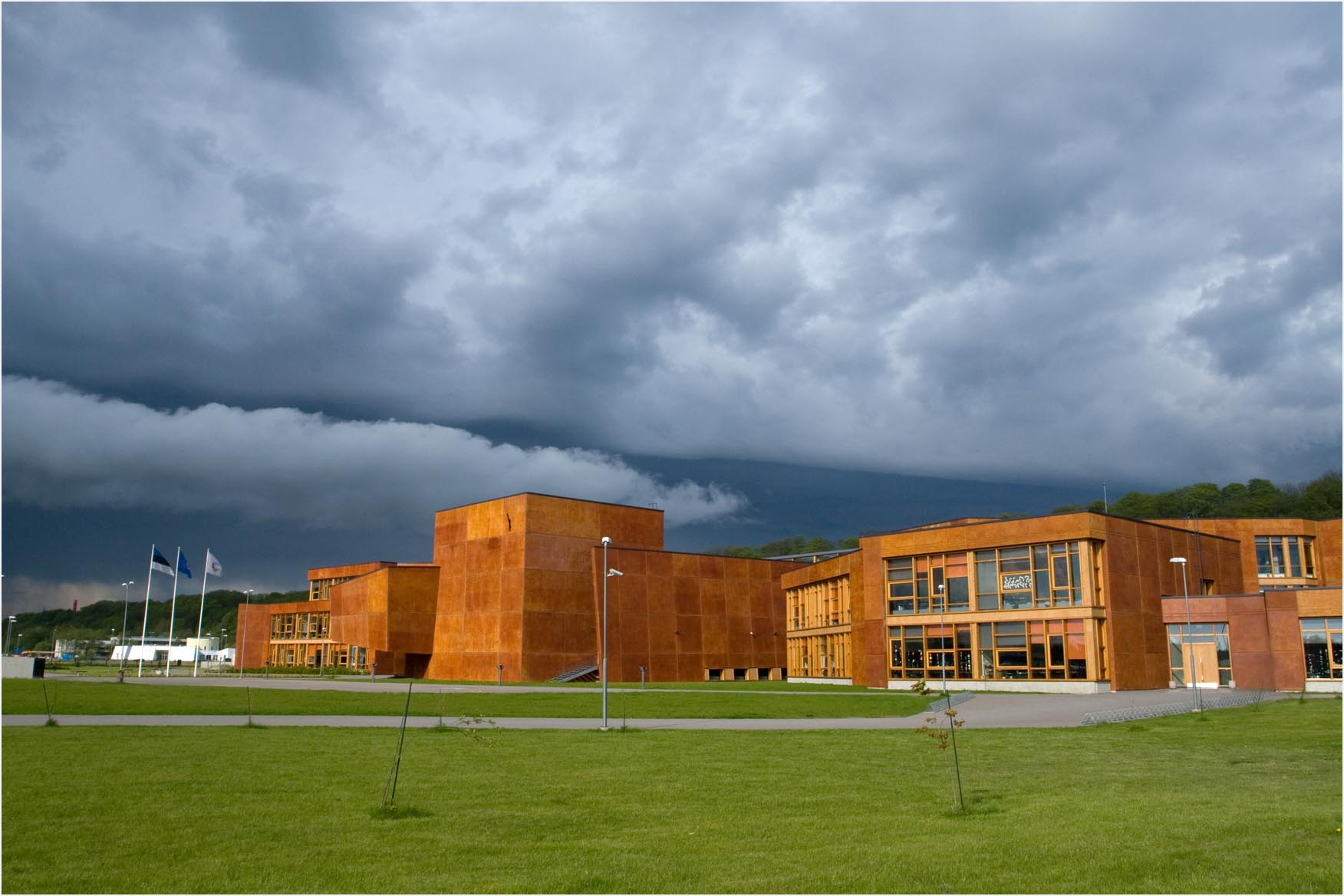
Viimsi School in Haabneeme.

- Apartment buildings in Pirita, 2003 (with Eero Endjärv, Mattias Agabus)
- Villa in Southern Estonia, 2004 (with Eero Endjärv, Mattias Agabus)
- Apartment building in Nõmme, 2005 (with Eero Endjärv, Raul Järg, Mattias Agabus)
- Apartment building on Kreutzwaldi street in Tallinn, 2005 (with Eero Endjärv, Mattias Agabus)
- Apartment building in Viimsi, 2006 (with Eero Endjärv, Raul Järg, Mattias Agabus)
- New building of the Tallinn University, 2006 (with Eero Endjärv, Mattias Agabus, Raul Järgi, Priit Pent)
- Viimsi school, 2006 (with Eero Endjärv, Mattias Agabus, Priit Pent, Raul Järg)
- New library of the Tallinn Technical University, 2009 (with Eero Endjärv, Mattias Agabus)

== Competitions ==
- Planning competition for the Tallinn harbour area, 1999; 2. prize
- New building of the Tallinn University, 2003; 1. prize
- Library of the Tallinn Technical University, 2006, 1. prize
