= Robert Geyer (academic) =

British academic

Robert Geyer is a British-based academic and Professor of Politics, Complexity, and Policy at Lancaster University. He is the former Head of the Department of Politics, Philosophy and Religion at Lancaster and has previously worked as Faculty of Arts and Social Sciences Associate Dean for Engagement and Internationalisation and Deputy Dean of the Faculty of Arts and Social Sciences at the same institution. He has previously worked at the University of Liverpool.

== Research interests ==
Robert Geyer's research interests are complexity and policy and he has previously been on the editorial board of the Complexity, Governance, and Networks and the Journal of Policy and Complex Systems. He was previously a Director on the Council of Management of the UK Complexity Society and was the founding Director of the Centre for Complexity Research between 2002 and 2007.

== Bibliography ==
- The Uncertain Union : British and Norwegian Social Democrats in an Integrating Europe (Ashgate, 1997)
- Globalization, Europeanization, and the End of Scandinavian Social Democracy?, co-authored with Christine Ingebritsen and Jonathon Moses (Macmillan, 2000)
- Exploring European Social Policy (Polity, 2000)
- Integrating UK and European Social Policy: The Complexity of Europeanization (Radcliffe, 2005)
- Riding the Diabetes Rollercoaster: A Patient and Carers Guide, co-authored with Helen Cooper (Radcliffe, 2007)
- Complexity, Science and Society, co-authored with Jan Bogg (Radcliffe, 2007)
- Complexity and Public Policy: A New Approach to 21st Century Politics, Policy and Society, co-authored with Samir Rihani (Routledge, 2010)
- Handbook on Complexity and Public Policy, co-authored with Paul Cairney (Edward Elgar, 2015)
