= Ilmari Oksanen =

Finnish footballer (1906-1977)

Ilmari Oksanen (24 December 1906, Turku – 31 January 1977, Turku) was a Finnish footballer.

He earned 5 caps at international level between 1937 and 1941.

At club level Oksanen played for TPS.

== Honours ==
- Finnish Championship: 1928, 1939, 1941, 1945
