= Robert Geyer (runner) =

French middle-distance runner

Personal information
- Nationality: French
- Born: 22 October 1899 Noyon, France
- Died: 13 October 1982 (aged 82) Grenoble, France

Sport
- Sport: Middle-distance running
- Event: Steeplechase

Robert Geyer (22 October 1899 – 13 October 1982) was a French middle-distance runner. He competed in the men's 3000 metres steeplechase at the 1920 Summer Olympics.
