= Ilmārs Liepiņš =

Latvian footballer

Personal information
- Date of birth: 1 January 1947
- Place of birth: Riga, Latvia
- Date of death: 26 August 2007 (aged 60)
- Position(s): midfielder

Senior career*
Years	Team	Apps	(Gls)
196?–1968	Elektrons Rīga		
1969–1979	FK Daugava Rīga	360	(74)
- *Club domestic league appearances and goals

Ilmārs Liepiņš (1947–2007) was a Latvian football midfielder who played for 10 years for FK Daugava Rīga.

Ilmārs Liepiņš came from a football family – his father Ēvalds Liepiņš was a striker for "Daugava" back in 1946-1948 and his brother Juris played for ESR-Enerģija – one of the strongest times in the Soviet Latvian league.

After completion of Riga football school Ilmārs played for Elektrons Rīga and soon was invited to join FK Daugava. In his first season Liepiņš played in 17 matches but already in 1970 he had become a crucial part of the team and was elected team captain. He played for Daugava until 1979 and was one of the most popular players on the team. In his 10 years for Daugava Liepiņš made 360 appearances and scored 74 goals.

Upon retiring from active football Liepiņš went on to coaching kids football in the Riga football school where he worked until his death in 2007. He died from wounds after being attacked by a group of teenagers.
