= Mattias Agabus =

Estonian architect

Mattias Agabus (born 15 September 1977) is an Estonian architect. He studied in the Estonian Academy of Arts in the department of architecture and city planning, graduating from the academy in 2001. Mattias Agabus is a member of the Union of Estonian Architects.

From 2000 to 2001 he worked in the Arhitektuuriagentuur OÜ architectural bureau. From 2001 to 2009, he worked as a partner in the architectural office Agabus, Endjärv & Truverk OÜ, Since 2009, he has worked for Allianss Architects OÜ.

He is noted for the design of the Viimsi School, new building of the Tallinn University, villa in Otepää in Southern Estonia and the new library of the Tallinn Technical University.

== Works ==
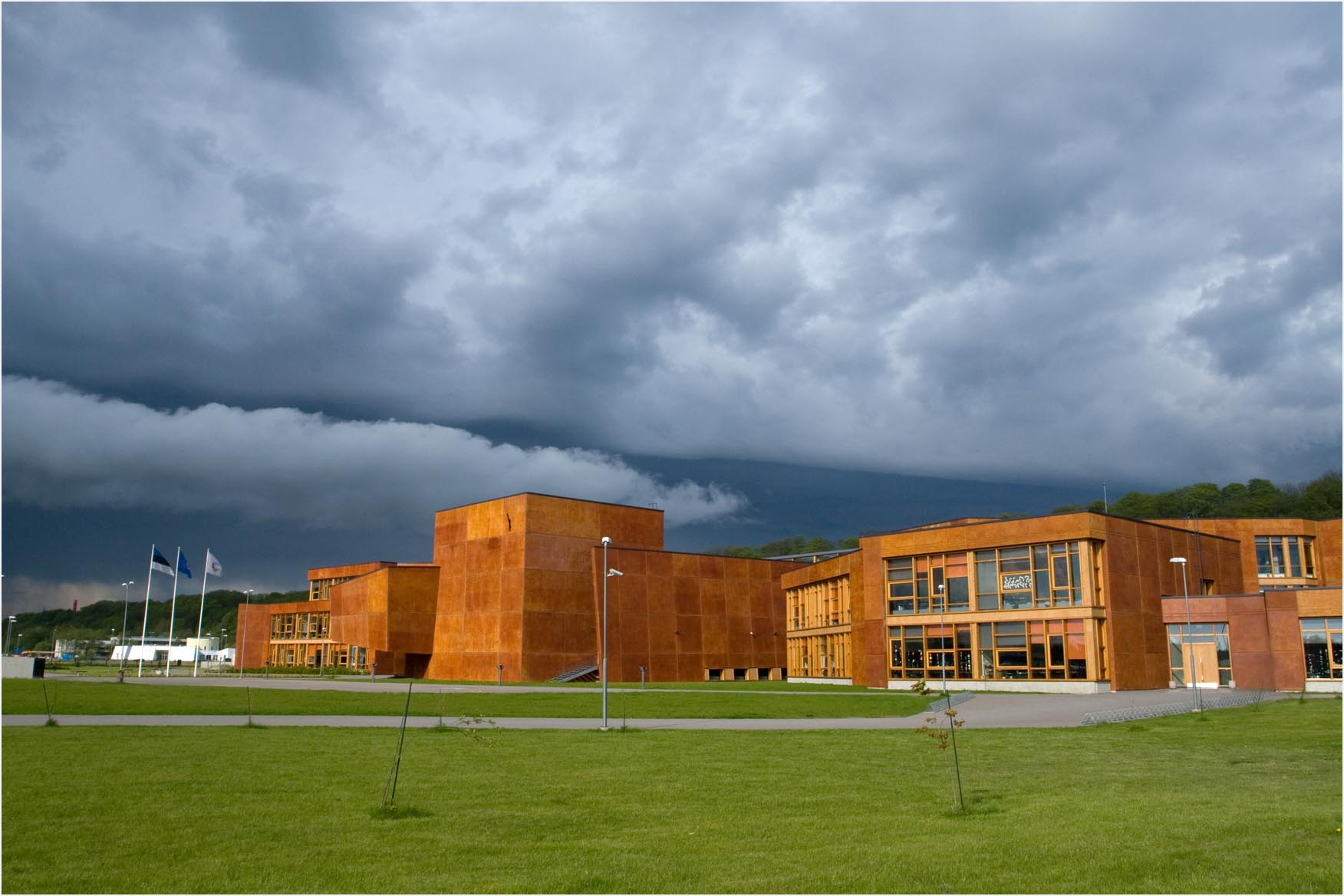
Viimsi School in Haabneeme

- Apartment buildings in Pirita, 2003 (with Eero Endjärv, Illimar Truverk)
- Villa in Southern Estonia, 2004 (with Eero Endjärv, Illimar Truverk)
- Apartment building in Nõmme, 2005 (with Eero Endjärv, Raul Järg, Illimar Truverk)
- Apartment building on Kreutzwald Street in Tallinn, 2005 (with Eero Endjärv, Illimar Truverk)
- Apartment building in Viimsi, 2006 (with Eero Endjärv, Raul Järg, Illimar Truverk)
- New building of Tallinn University, 2006 (with Eero Endjärv, Illimar Truverk, Raul Järgi, Priit Pent)
- Viimsi school, 2006 (with Eero Endjärv, Illimar Truverk, Priit Pent, Raul Järg)
- New library of the Tallinn Technical University, 2009 (with Eero Endjärv, Illimar Truverk)

== Competitions ==
- Planning competition for the Tallinn harbour area, 1999; 2. prize
- New building of Tallinn University, 2003; 1. prize
- Library of Tallinn Technical University, 2006, 1. prize
