= Ilmar Öpik =

Estonian energetics scientist

Ilmar Öpik (17 June 1917 Tallinn – 29 July 2001) was an Estonian energetics scientist, academician.

In 1940 he graduated from Tallinn University of Technology as an engineer-mechanic. In 1963 he defended his doctoral thesis at Moscow Energetics Institute (Estonian: Moskva Energeetika Instituut). Since 1946 he taught at Tallinn Polytechnical Institute.

Since 1967 he became a member of Estonian Academy of Sciences. 1977-1978 he was the vice-president of the academy. 1984-1996 he was the chief editor of the journal Oil Shale.

Much of his research was related to oil shale.

Awards:

- 1996: Order of the National Coat of Arms, III class.
