= List of French Athletics Championships winners (men) =

The French Athletics Championships (French: Championnats de France d'athlétisme) is a series of annual outdoor competition in the sport of athletics, organised by the Fédération française d'athlétisme (FFA; French Athletics Federation), which serve as the French national championships. The winners of the events are typically French nationals, though foreign athletes have also won at the championships, typically competing through invitation or as a foreign athlete based at an athletics club in France. Most typical is the presence of African athletes from the Françafrique region.

== Events ==
=== 100 metres ===
- 1960: Claude Piquemal
- 1961: Jocelyn Delecour
- 1962: Jocelyn Delecour
- 1963: Claude Piquemal
- 1964: Bernard Laidebeur
- 1965: Roger Bambuck
- 1966: Roger Bambuck
- 1967: Roger Bambuck
- 1968: Roger Bambuck
- 1969: Gérard Fenouil
- 1970: Alain Sarteur
- 1971: Jean-Pierre Grès
- 1972: Alain Sarteur
- 1973: Gilles Échevin
- 1974: Steve Williams (USA)
- 1975: Gilles Échevin
- 1976: Dominique Chauvelot
- 1977: Lucien Sainte-Rose
- 1978: Hermann Panzo
- 1979: Philippe Lejoncour
- 1980: Hermann Panzo
- 1981: Antoine Richard
- 1982: Antoine Richard
- 1983: Antoine Richard
- 1984: Bruno Marie-Rose
- 1985: Antoine Richard
- 1986: Antoine Richard
- 1987: Max Morinière
- 1988: Max Morinière
- 1989: Bruno Marie-Rose
- 1990: Daniel Sangouma
- 1991: Daniel Sangouma
- 1992: Jean-Charles Trouabal
- 1993: Jean-Charles Trouabal
- 1994: Jean-Charles Trouabal
- 1995: Olivier Théophile
- 1996: Ibrahim Meité (CIV)
- 1997: Stéphane Cali
- 1998: Stéphane Cali
- 1999: Issa-Aimé Nthépé
- 2000: David Patros
- 2001: Frédéric Krantz
- 2002: Idrissa Sanou (BUR)
- 2003: Issa-Aimé Nthépé
- 2004: Issa-Aimé Nthépé
- 2005: Lueyi Dovy
- 2006: Ronald Pognon

=== 200 metres ===
- 1960: Paul Genevay
- 1961: Jocelyn Delecour
- 1962: Jocelyn Delecour
- 1963: Jocelyn Delecour
- 1964: Jocelyn Delecour
- 1965: Roger Bambuck
- 1966: Roger Bambuck
- 1967: Roger Bambuck
- 1968: Roger Bambuck
- 1969: Gérard Fenouil
- 1970: Gérard Fenouil
- 1971: Gérard Fenouil
- 1972: René Metz
- 1973: Lucien Sainte-Rose
- 1974: Joseph Arame
- 1975: Joseph Arame
- 1976: Joseph Arame
- 1977: Joseph Arame
- 1978: Pascal Barré
- 1979: Pascal Barré
- 1980: Joseph Arame
- 1981: Patrick Barré
- 1982: Herman Lomba
- 1983: Jean-Jacques Boussemart
- 1984: Jean-Jacques Boussemart
- 1985: Antoine Richard
- 1986: Bruno Marie-Rose
- 1987: Bruno Marie-Rose
- 1988: Jean-Charles Trouabal
- 1989: Gilles Quenéhervé
- 1990: Jean-Charles Trouabal
- 1991: Jean-Charles Trouabal
- 1992: Jean-Charles Trouabal
- 1993: Jean-Charles Trouabal
- 1994: Jean-Charles Trouabal
- 1995: Jean-Charles Trouabal
- 1996: Christophe Cheval
- 1997: Christophe Cheval
- 1998: Christophe Cheval
- 1999: Thierry Lubin
- 2000: Joseph Batangdon (CMR)
- 2001: Joseph Batangdon (CMR)
- 2002: Joseph Batangdon (CMR)
- 2003: Joseph Batangdon (CMR)
- 2004: Leslie Djhone
- 2005: Ronald Pognon
- 2006: David Alerte

=== 400 metres ===
- 1960: Jean-Pierre Haarhoff
- 1961: Jean Bertozzi
- 1962: Germain Nelzy
- 1963: Jean-Pierre Boccardo
- 1964: Jean-Pierre Boccardo
- 1965: Michel Samper
- 1966: Jean-Pierre Boccardo
- 1967: Christian Nicolau
- 1968: Jean-Claude Nallet
- 1969: Jean-Claude Nallet
- 1970: Jean-Claude Nallet
- 1971: Jean-Claude Nallet
- 1972: Francis Kerbiriou
- 1973: Francis Demarthon
- 1974: Francis Demarthon
- 1975: Francis Kerbiriou
- 1976: Bernd Herrmann (FRG)
- 1977: Georges Kablan Degnan (CIV)
- 1978: Francis Demarthon
- 1979: Francis Demarthon
- 1980: Didier Dubois
- 1981: Paul Bourdin
- 1982: Pascal Barré
- 1983: Gabriel Tiacoh (CIV)
- 1984: Gabriel Tiacoh (CIV)
- 1985: Aldo Canti
- 1986: Yann Quentrec
- 1987: Yann Quentrec
- 1988: Patrick Barré
- 1989: Olivier Noirot
- 1990: Olivier Noirot
- 1991: Olivier Noirot
- 1992: Stéphane Diagana
- 1993: Stéphane Diagana
- 1994: Stéphane Diagana
- 1995: Stéphane Diagana
- 1996: Ibrahima Wade (SEN)
- 1997: Stéphane Diagana
- 1998: Eric Milazar (MRI)
- 1999: Ibrahima Wade (SEN)
- 2000: Ibrahima Wade
- 2001: Stéphane Diagana
- 2002: Marc Raquil
- 2003: Eric Milazar (MRI)
- 2004: Marc Raquil
- 2005: Marc Raquil
- 2006: Leslie Djhone

=== 800 metres ===
- 1960: Pierre-Yvon Lenoir
- 1961: Michel Jazy
- 1962: Michel Jazy
- 1963: Maurice Lurot
- 1964: Maurice Lurot
- 1965: Maurice Lurot
- 1966: Maurice Lurot
- 1967: Michel Samper
- 1968: Jean-Pierre Dufresne
- 1969: Guy Taillard
- 1970: Gilles Sibon
- 1971: Patrick Gadonna
- 1972: Roqui Sanchez
- 1973: Marcel Philippe
- 1974: John Walker (NZL)
- 1975: Rick Wohlhuter (USA)
- 1976: Roqui Sanchez
- 1977: Mark Enyeart (USA)
- 1978: Roger Milhau
- 1979: Roger Milhau
- 1980: Roger Milhau
- 1981: Philippe Dupont
- 1982: José Marajo
- 1983: Philippe Dupont
- 1984: Philippe Dupont
- 1985: Philippe Dupont
- 1986: Claude Diomar
- 1987: Philippe Collard
- 1988: Claude Diomar
- 1989: Cheikh Tidiane Boye (SEN)
- 1990: Frédéric Sille
- 1991: Charles Nkazamyampi (BDI)
- 1992: Frédéric Cornette
- 1993: Jean-Christophe Vialettes
- 1994: Arthémon Hatungimana (BDI)
- 1995: Arthémon Hatungimana (BDI)
- 1996: Jimmy Jean-Joseph
- 1997: David Divad
- 1998: Jimmy Jean-Joseph
- 1999: Assane Diallo (SEN)
- 2000: David Divad
- 2001: Arthémon Hatungimana (BDI)
- 2002: Nicolas Aissat
- 2003: Abdoulaye Wagne (SEN)
- 2004: Mouhssin Chehibi (MAR)
- 2005: Florent Lacasse
- 2006: Florent Lacasse

=== 1500 metres ===
- 1960: Michel Jazy
- 1961: Jean Clausse
- 1962: Jean Clausse
- 1963: Michel Jazy
- 1964: Michel Jazy
- 1965: Jean Wadoux
- 1966: Jean Wadoux
- 1967: Jean Wadoux
- 1968: Jean Wadoux
- 1969: Jean Wadoux
- 1970: Jean Wadoux
- 1971: Jean-Pierre Dufresne
- 1972: Jean-Pierre Dufresne
- 1973: Jean-Louis Benoît
- 1974: Rod Dixon (NZL)
- 1975: Francis Gonzalez
- 1976: Francis Gonzalez
- 1977: Francis Gonzalez
- 1978: Francis Gonzalez
- 1979: Alexandre Gonzalez
- 1980: Didier Bégouin
- 1981: Alexandre Gonzalez
- 1982: Alexandre Gonzalez
- 1983: Philippe Dien
- 1984: Pascal Thiébaut
- 1985: Pascal Thiébaut
- 1986: Pascal Thiébaut
- 1987: Rémy Geoffroy
- 1988: Hervé Phélippeau
- 1989: Hervé Phélippeau
- 1990: Hervé Phélippeau
- 1991: Guy Nunige
- 1992: Pascal Thiébaut
- 1993: Éric Dubus
- 1994: Samir Benfarès
- 1995: Driss Maazouzi (MAR)
- 1996: Driss Maazouzi (MAR)
- 1997: Driss Maazouzi (MAR)
- 1998: Driss Maazouzi (MAR)
- 1999: Driss Maazouzi
- 2000: Driss Maazouzi
- 2001: Driss Maazouzi
- 2002: Mehdi Baala
- 2003: Fouad Chouki
- 2004: Bouabdellah Tahri
- 2005: Mehdi Baala
- 2006: Bouabdellah Tahri

=== 5000 metres ===
- 1960: Michel Bernard
- 1961: Robert Bogey
- 1962: Michel Bernard
- 1963: Robert Bogey
- 1964: Jean Fayolle
- 1965: Guy Texereau
- 1966: Michel Jazy
- 1967: René Jourdan
- 1968: Jean Wadoux
- 1969: René Jourdan
- 1970: René Jourdan
- 1971: Jean Wadoux
- 1972: Raymond Zembri
- 1973: Jean-Claude Rampon
- 1974: Eddy Van Mullen (BEL)
- 1975: Jean Levaillant
- 1976: Jean Conrath
- 1977: Jacky Boxberger
- 1978: Jean Conrath
- 1979: Dominique Coux
- 1980: Philippe Legrand
- 1981: Radhouane Bouster
- 1982: Jacky Boxberger
- 1983: Thierry Watrice
- 1984: Francis Gonzalez
- 1985: Jean-Louis Prianon
- 1986: Paul Arpin
- 1987: Paul Arpin
- 1988: Paul Arpin
- 1989: Pascal Clouvel
- 1990: Jean-Louis Prianon
- 1991: Abdellah Béhar (MAR)
- 1992: Tony Martins
- 1993: Mohamed Choumassi (MAR)
- 1994: Mohamed Choumassi (MAR)
- 1995: Atiq Naaji
- 1996: Mohamed Ezzher
- 1997: Abdellah Béhar
- 1998: Driss El Himer
- 1999: Rachid Chékhémani
- 2000: Driss El Himer
- 2001: Rachid Chékhémani
- 2002: Loïc Letellier
- 2003: Driss El Himer
- 2004: Mokhtar Benhari
- 2005: Loïc Letellier
- 2006: Frédéric Denis

=== 10,000 metres ===
- 1960: Robert Bogey
- 1961: Michel Bernard
- 1962: Robert Bogey
- 1963: Guy Texereau
- 1964: Michel Bernard
- 1965: Michel Bernard
- 1966: Jean Fayolle
- 1967: Noël Tijou
- 1968: René Jourdan
- 1969: Noël Tijou
- 1970: Noël Tijou
- 1971: Noël Tijou
- 1972: Noël Tijou
- 1973: Lucien Rault
- 1974: Emiel Puttemans (BEL)
- 1975: Jean-Paul Gomez
- 1976: Jean-Paul Gomez
- 1977: Jacky Boxberger
- 1978: Radhouane Bouster
- 1979: Dominique Coux
- 1980: Radhouane Bouster
- 1981: Radhouane Bouster
- 1982: Philippe Legrand
- 1983: Philippe Legrand
- 1984: Philippe Legrand
- 1985: Jean-Louis Prianon
- 1986: Jean-Louis Prianon
- 1987: Philippe Legrand
- 1988: Thierry Pantel
- 1989: Didier Bernard
- 1990: Paul Arpin
- 1991: Bertrand Itsweire
- 1992: Thierry Pantel
- 1993: Mustapha Essaïd
- 1994: Mohamed Ezzher
- 1995: Benoît Zwierzchiewski
- 1996: Mustapha Essaïd
- 1997: Mohamed Ezzher
- 1998: Larbi Zéroual
- 1999: Mohamed Serbouti
- 2000: Driss El Himer
- 2001: Mustapha El Ahmadi
- 2002: Abdellah Béhar
- 2003: Loïc Letellier
- 2004: Driss El Himer
- 2005: Driss El Himer
- 2006: Driss El Himer

=== Marathon ===
- 1960: Alain Mimoun
- 1961: Paul Genève
- 1962: Eric Hallberg
- 1963: Jean Lavaine
- 1964: Alain Mimoun
- 1965: Alain Mimoun
- 1966: Alain Mimoun
- 1967: Robert Gomez
- 1968: René Combes
- 1969: André Lacour
- 1970: René Combes
- 1971: Fernand Kolbeck
- 1972: Fernand Kolbeck
- 1973: Fernand Kolbeck
- 1974: Fernand Kolbeck
- 1975: Daniel Fossé
- 1976: Jean-Pierre Eudier
- 1977: Fernand Kolbeck
- 1978: Jean-Paul Gomez
- 1979: Bernard Bobès
- 1980: Bernard Bobès
- 1981: Dominique Chauvelier
- 1982: Bernard Faure
- 1983: Alain Lazare
- 1984: Patrick Joannès
- 1985: Patrick Joannès
- 1986: Alain Lazare
- 1987: Jean-Jacques Padel
- 1988: Alexandre Rachide
- 1989: Thierry Watrice
- 1990: Dominique Chauvelier
- 1991: Dominique Chauvelier
- 1992: Luis Soarès
- 1993: Dominique Chauvelier
- 1994: Philippe Rémond
- 1995: Abdi Djama
- 1996: Pascal Fétizon
- 1997: Pascal Blanchard
- 1998: Bertrand Itsweire
- 1999: Abdelhakim Bagy
- 2000: Benoît Zwierzchiewski
- 2001: Philippe Rémond
- 2002: Samir Baala
- 2003: Not held
- 2004: David Antoine
- 2005: David Antoine
- 2006: Mohamed Reziga

=== 3000 metres steeplechase ===
- 1960: Guy Texereau
- 1961: Jean Fayolle
- 1962: Guy Texereau
- 1963: Guy Texereau
- 1964: Guy Texereau
- 1965: Guy Texereau
- 1966: Guy Texereau
- 1967: Guy Texereau
- 1968: Guy Texereau
- 1969: Jean-Paul Villain
- 1970: Jean-Paul Villain
- 1971: Jean-Paul Villain
- 1972: Gérard Buchheit
- 1973: Gérard Buchheit
- 1974: Gérard Buchheit
- 1975: Gérard Buchheit
- 1976: Jean-Paul Villain
- 1977: Philippe Gauthier
- 1978: Jean-Luc Lemire
- 1979: Philippe Gauthier
- 1980: Joseph Mahmoud
- 1981: Joseph Mahmoud
- 1982: Joseph Mahmoud
- 1983: Joseph Mahmoud
- 1984: Joseph Mahmoud
- 1985: Joseph Mahmoud
- 1986: Pascal Debacker
- 1987: Raymond Pannier
- 1988: Raymond Pannier
- 1989: Joseph Mahmoud
- 1990: Ali Belghazi (MAR)
- 1991: Bruno Le Stum
- 1992: Joseph Mahmoud
- 1993: Thierry Brusseau
- 1994: Ali Belghazi
- 1995: Nadir Bosch
- 1996: Nadir Bosch
- 1997: Karim Kiche
- 1998: Bouabdellah Tahri
- 1999: Henri Belkacem
- 2000: Mohamed Bélabbès
- 2001: Frédéric Denis
- 2002: Vincent Le Dauphin
- 2003: Vincent Le Dauphin
- 2004: Gaël Pencreach
- 2005: Gaël Pencreach
- 2006: Mohamed Bélabbès

=== 110 metres hurdles ===
- 1960: Jacques Déprez
- 1961: Jacques Dohen
- 1962: Michel Chardel
- 1963: Marcel Duriez
- 1964: Bernard Fournet
- 1965: Marcel Duriez
- 1966: Marcel Duriez
- 1967: Marcel Duriez
- 1968: Marcel Duriez
- 1969: Jean-Pierre Corval
- 1970: Guy Drut
- 1971: Guy Drut
- 1972: Guy Drut
- 1973: Guy Drut
- 1974: Charles Foster (USA)
- 1975: Guy Drut
- 1976: Guy Drut
- 1977: Jean-Pierre Corval
- 1978: Emile Raybois
- 1979: Emile Raybois
- 1980: Guy Drut
- 1981: Philippe Hatil
- 1982: Philippe Hatil
- 1983: Stéphane Caristan
- 1984: Stéphane Caristan
- 1985: Stéphane Caristan
- 1986: Stéphane Caristan
- 1987: Philippe Aubert
- 1988: Philippe Tourret
- 1989: Philippe Tourret
- 1990: Philippe Tourret
- 1991: Dan Philibert
- 1992: Dan Philibert
- 1993: Dan Philibert
- 1994: Dan Philibert
- 1995: Dan Philibert
- 1996: Vincent Clarico
- 1997: Sébastien Thibault
- 1998: Vincent Clarico
- 1999: Dan Philibert
- 2000: Sébastien Denis
- 2001: Joseph-Berlioz Randriamihaja (MAD)
- 2002: Sébastien Denis
- 2003: Sébastien Denis
- 2004: Ladji Doucouré
- 2005: Ladji Doucouré
- 2006: Cédric Lavanne

=== 400 metres hurdles ===
- 1960: Georges Mysson
- 1961: Georges Mysson
- 1962: Eddy Van Praagh
- 1963: Robert Poirier
- 1964: Jean-Jacques Behm
- 1965: Robert Poirier
- 1966: Robert Poirier
- 1967: Robert Poirier
- 1968: Robert Poirier
- 1969: François Huard
- 1970: Michel Montgermont
- 1971: Michel Montgermont
- 1972: Jean-Pierre Perrinelle
- 1973: Luc Baggio
- 1974: Jim Bolding (USA)
- 1975: Jean-Claude Nallet
- 1976: Jean-Pierre Perrinelle
- 1977: Luc Baggio
- 1978: Jean-Claude Nallet
- 1979: Patrick Chazot
- 1980: Patrick Chazot
- 1981: Serge Guillen
- 1982: Serge Guillen
- 1983: Gérard Brunel
- 1984: Gérard Brunel
- 1985: Olivier Gui
- 1986: Philippe Gonigam
- 1987: Gilles Vimbert
- 1988: Olivier Gui
- 1989: Saïd Aberkan (MAR)
- 1990: Stéphane Diagana
- 1991: Amadou Dia Ba (SEN)
- 1992: Stéphane Caristan
- 1993: Hubert Rakotombélontsoa (MAD)
- 1994: Hamidou M'Baye (SEN)
- 1995: Jimmy Coco
- 1996: Ibou Faye (SEN)
- 1997: Ibou Faye (SEN)
- 1998: Jimmy Coco
- 1999: Ibou Faye (SEN)
- 2000: Ibou Faye (SEN)
- 2001: Yvon Rakotoarimiandry (MAD)
- 2002: Olivier Jean-Théodore
- 2003: Naman Keïta
- 2004: Naman Keïta
- 2005: Naman Keïta
- 2006: Naman Keïta

=== High jump ===
- 1960: Mahamat Idriss
- 1961: Mahamat Idriss
- 1962: Raymond Dugarreau
- 1963: Maurice Fournier
- 1964: Robert Sainte-Rose
- 1965: Robert Sainte-Rose
- 1966: Robert Sainte-Rose
- 1967: Robert Sainte-Rose
- 1968: Robert Sainte-Rose
- 1969: Christian Le Hérissé
- 1970: Jean-Paul Jeanneret
- 1971: Henry Elliott
- 1972: Henry Elliott
- 1973: Paul Poaniéwa
- 1974: Dwight Stones (USA)
- 1975: Paul Poaniéwa
- 1976: Jacques Aletti
- 1977: Rory Kotinek (USA)
- 1978: Paul Poaniéwa
- 1979: Francis Agbo
- 1980: Paul Tanon
- 1981: Franck Bonnet
- 1982: Franck Verzy
- 1983: Moussa Fall (SEN)
- 1984: Franck Verzy
- 1985: Dominique Hernandez
- 1986: Franck Verzy
- 1987: Jean-Charles Gicquel
- 1988: Dominique Hernandez
- 1989: Joël Vincent
- 1990: Jean-Charles Gicquel
- 1991: Joël Vincent
- 1992: Joël Vincent
- 1993: Xavier Robilliard
- 1994: Jean-Charles Gicquel
- 1995: Jean-Charles Gicquel
- 1996: Didier Detchénique
- 1997: Didier Detchénique
- 1998: Didier Detchénique
- 1999: Mustapha Raifak
- 2000: Dieudonné Opota
- 2001: Grégory Gabella
- 2002: Dieudonné Opota
- 2003: Joan Charmant
- 2004: Grégory Gabella
- 2005: Grégory Gabella
- 2006: Mickaël Hanany

=== Pole vault ===
- 1960: Bernard Balastre
- 1961: Bernard Balastre
- 1962: Maurice Houvion
- 1963: Maurice Houvion
- 1964: Alain Moreaux
- 1965: Hervé d'Encausse
- 1966: Hervé d'Encausse
- 1967: Jean-Pierre Colusso
- 1968: Hervé d'Encausse
- 1969: François Tracanelli
- 1970: Michel Ollivary
- 1971: Serge Lefebvre
- 1972: Hervé d'Encausse & François Tracanelli
- 1973: Jean-Michel Bellot
- 1974: David Roberts (USA)
- 1975: Don Baird (AUS)
- 1976: François Tracanelli
- 1977: Mike Tully (USA)
- 1978: Philippe Houvion
- 1979: Philippe Houvion
- 1980: Thierry Vigneron
- 1981: Jean-Michel Bellot
- 1982: Pierre Quinon
- 1983: Pierre Quinon
- 1984: Pierre Quinon
- 1985: Philippe Collet
- 1986: Thierry Vigneron
- 1987: Ferenc Salbert
- 1988: Philippe Collet
- 1989: Philippe Collet
- 1990: Ferenc Salbert
- 1991: Philippe Collet
- 1992: Philippe Collet
- 1993: Jean Galfione
- 1994: Jean Galfione
- 1995: Jean Galfione
- 1996: Jean Galfione
- 1997: Jean Galfione
- 1998: Jean Galfione
- 1999: Alain Andji
- 2000: Romain Mesnil
- 2001: Romain Mesnil
- 2002: Romain Mesnil
- 2003: Romain Mesnil
- 2004: Nicolas Guigon
- 2005: Pierre-Charles Peuf
- 2006: Nicolas Guigon

=== Long jump ===
- 1960: Ali Brakchi
- 1961: Alain Veron
- 1962: Ali Brakchi
- 1963: Gérard Mahieu
- 1964: Jean Cochard
- 1965: Jean Cochard
- 1966: Ali Brakchi
- 1967: Jack Pani
- 1968: Jack Pani
- 1969: Jack Pani
- 1970: Christian Tourret
- 1971: Jack Pani
- 1972: André Vix
- 1973: Jean-François Bonhème
- 1974: Jean-François Bonhème
- 1975: Jacques Rousseau
- 1976: Jacques Rousseau
- 1977: Jacques Rousseau
- 1978: Gilbert Zante
- 1979: Jean-François Bonhème
- 1980: Philippe Deroche
- 1981: Denis Pinabel
- 1982: Denis Pinabel
- 1983: Philippe Deroche
- 1984: Claude Morinière
- 1985: Norbert Brige
- 1986: Norbert Brige
- 1987: Norbert Brige
- 1988: Norbert Brige
- 1989: Norbert Brige
- 1990: Jean-Louis Rapnouil
- 1991: Franck Lestage
- 1992: Kader Klouchi (ALG)
- 1993: Cheikh Touré (SEN)
- 1994: Robert Emmiyan (ARM)
- 1995: Cheikh Touré (SEN)
- 1996: Emmanuel Bangué
- 1997: Kader Klouchi
- 1998: Kader Klouchi
- 1999: Emmanuel Bangué
- 2000: Cheikh Touré
- 2001: Kader Klouchi
- 2002: Yann Domenech
- 2003: Salim Sdiri
- 2004: Salim Sdiri
- 2005: Salim Sdiri
- 2006: Salim Sdiri

=== Triple jump ===
- 1960: Éric Battista
- 1961: Pierre William
- 1962: Éric Battista
- 1963: Éric Battista
- 1964: Éric Battista
- 1965: Éric Battista
- 1966: Éric Battista
- 1967: Christian Kaddour
- 1968: Christian Martigne
- 1969: Serge Firca
- 1970: Alain Bourguignon
- 1971: Serge Firca
- 1972: Bernard Lamitié
- 1973: Bernard Lamitié
- 1974: Bernard Lamitié
- 1975: Christian Valétudié
- 1976: Bernard Lamitié
- 1977: Bernard Lamitié
- 1978: Jean-Hervé Stievenart
- 1979: Christian Valétudié
- 1980: Christian Valétudié
- 1981: Henri Dorina
- 1982: Christian Valétudié
- 1983: Christian Valétudié
- 1984: Alain René-Corail
- 1985: Alain René-Corail
- 1986: Serge Hélan
- 1987: Serge Hélan
- 1988: Pierre Camara
- 1989: Serge Hélan
- 1990: Toussaint Rabenala (MAD)
- 1991: Serge Hélan
- 1992: Pierre Camara
- 1993: Pierre Camara
- 1994: Serge Hélan
- 1995: Georges Sainte-Rose
- 1996: Serge Hélan
- 1997: Georges Sainte-Rose
- 1998: Jimmy Gabriel
- 1999: Jérôme Romain
- 2000: Jimmy Gabriel
- 2001: Karl Taillepierre
- 2002: Arius Filet
- 2003: Julien Kapek
- 2004: Karl Taillepierre
- 2005: Karl Taillepierre
- 2006: Julien Kapek

=== Shot put ===
- 1960: Pierre Colnard
- 1961: Pierre Colnard
- 1962: Jean-Claude Ernwein
- 1963: Pierre Colnard
- 1964: André Godard
- 1965: Pierre Colnard
- 1966: Pierre Colnard
- 1967: Pierre Colnard
- 1968: Arnjolt Beer
- 1969: Pierre Colnard
- 1970: Pierre Colnard
- 1971: Arnjolt Beer
- 1972: Yves Brouzet
- 1973: Yves Brouzet
- 1974: George Woods (USA)
- 1975: Yves Brouzet
- 1976: Yves Brouzet
- 1977: Terry Albritton (USA)
- 1978: Arnjolt Beer
- 1979: Luc Viudès
- 1980: Arnjolt Beer
- 1981: Luc Viudès
- 1982: Luc Viudès
- 1983: Mohamed Fatihi (MAR)
- 1984: Luc Viudès
- 1985: Luc Viudès
- 1986: Luc Viudès
- 1987: Luc Viudès
- 1988: Luc Viudès
- 1989: Luc Viudès
- 1990: Luc Viudès
- 1991: Luc Viudès
- 1992: Luc Viudès
- 1993: Luc Viudès
- 1994: Jean-Louis Lebon
- 1995: Jean-Louis Lebon
- 1996: Jean-Louis Lebon
- 1997: Jean-Louis Lebon
- 1998: Stéphane Vial
- 1999: Stéphane Vial
- 2000: Yves Niaré
- 2001: Yves Niaré
- 2002: Yves Niaré
- 2003: Yves Niaré
- 2004: Yves Niaré
- 2005: Yves Niaré
- 2006: Gaëtan Bucki

=== Discus throw ===
- 1960: Pierre Alard
- 1961: Pierre Alard
- 1962: Pierre Alard
- 1963: Pierre Alard
- 1964: Pierre Alard
- 1965: Pierre Alard
- 1966: Alain Drufin
- 1967: Pierre Alard
- 1968: Pierre Alard
- 1969: Pierre Alard
- 1970: Michel Grosso
- 1971: Jacques Nys
- 1972: Michel Chabrier
- 1973: Frédéric Piette
- 1974: John Powell (USA)
- 1975: Michel Chabrier
- 1976: Bishop Dolegiewicz (CAN)
- 1977: Mac Wilkins (USA)
- 1978: Frédéric Piette
- 1979: Frédéric Piette
- 1980: Namakoro Niaré (MLI)
- 1981: Frédéric Piette
- 1982: Namakoro Niaré
- 1983: Namakoro Niaré
- 1984: René-Jean Coquin
- 1985: Namakoro Niaré
- 1986: Frédéric Selle
- 1987: Serge Avédissian
- 1988: Patrick Journoud
- 1989: Patrick Journoud
- 1990: Patrick Journoud
- 1991: Frédéric Selle
- 1992: Jean-Claude Retel
- 1993: Jean-Claude Retel
- 1994: Mickaël Conjungo (CAF)
- 1995: Mickaël Conjungo (CAF)
- 1996: Jean Pons
- 1997: Jean Pons
- 1998: Jean-Claude Retel
- 1999: Jean-Claude Retel
- 2000: Jean-Claude Retel
- 2001: Jean-Claude Retel
- 2002: Jean-Claude Retel
- 2003: Erik Boès
- 2004: Jean-Claude Retel
- 2005: Jean-Claude Retel
- 2006: Jean-Claude Retel

=== Hammer throw ===
- 1960: Guy Husson
- 1961: Guy Husson
- 1962: Guy Husson
- 1963: Guy Husson
- 1964: Guy Husson
- 1965: Guy Husson
- 1966: Guy Husson
- 1967: Guy Husson
- 1968: Guy Husson
- 1969: Jacques Accambray
- 1970: Jacques Accambray
- 1971: Vladimir Prikhodko
- 1972: Vladimir Prikhodko
- 1973: Vladimir Prikhodko
- 1974: Daniel Mikolajczyk
- 1975: Jacques Accambray
- 1976: Jacques Accambray
- 1977: Peter Farmer (AUS)
- 1978: Philippe Suriray
- 1979: Jacques Accambray
- 1980: Peter Farmer (AUS)
- 1981: Philippe Suriray
- 1982: Philippe Suriray
- 1983: Walter Ciofani
- 1984: Walter Ciofani
- 1985: Walter Ciofani
- 1986: Walter Ciofani
- 1987: Walter Ciofani
- 1988: Frédéric Kuhn
- 1989: Frédéric Kuhn
- 1990: Raphaël Piolanti
- 1991: Raphaël Piolanti
- 1992: Raphaël Piolanti
- 1993: Raphaël Piolanti
- 1994: Gilles Dupray
- 1995: Christophe Épalle
- 1996: Raphaël Piolanti
- 1997: Raphaël Piolanti
- 1998: Christophe Épalle
- 1999: Raphaël Piolanti
- 2000: David Chaussinand
- 2001: Nicolas Figère
- 2002: Nicolas Figère
- 2003: Christophe Épalle
- 2004: Christophe Épalle
- 2005: Nicolas Figère
- 2006: Christophe Épalle

=== Javelin throw ===
- 1960: Michel Macquet
- 1961: Michel Macquet
- 1962: Léon Syrovatski
- 1963: Léon Syrovatski
- 1964: Michel Macquet
- 1965: Michel Macquet
- 1966: Petelo Wakalina
- 1967: Christian Monneret
- 1968: Petelo Wakalina
- 1969: Michel Butet
- 1970: Lolésio Tuita
- 1971: Manuel Ibanez
- 1972: Lolésio Tuita
- 1973: Lolésio Tuita
- 1974: Serge Leroy
- 1975: Serge Leroy
- 1976: André Lajoie (CAN)
- 1977: Penisio Lutui
- 1978: Penisio Lutui
- 1979: Penisio Lutui
- 1980: Serge Leroy
- 1981: Penisio Lutui
- 1982: Péta Tauhavili
- 1983: Jean-Paul Lakafia
- 1984: Jean-Paul Lakafia
- 1985: Philippe Lecurieux
- 1986: Michel Bertimon
- 1987: Pascal Lefèvre
- 1988: Pascal Lefèvre
- 1989: Pascal Lefèvre
- 1990: Pascal Lefèvre
- 1991: Pascal Lefèvre
- 1992: Pascal Lefèvre
- 1993: Pascal Lefèvre
- 1994: Pascal Lefèvre
- 1995: Pascal Lefèvre
- 1996: Alain Storaci
- 1997: Bouna Diop (SEN)
- 1998: Gaëtan Siakinuu-Schmidt
- 1999: Tommi Huotilainen (FIN)
- 2000: Laurent Dorique
- 2001: Laurent Dorique
- 2002: Gaëtan Siakinuu-Schmidt
- 2003: Dominique Pausé
- 2004: Stuart Farquhar (NZL)
- 2005: David Brisseault
- 2006: Vitolio Tipotio

=== Decathlon ===
- 1960: René-Jean Monneret
- 1961: René-Jean Monneret
- 1962: René-Jean Monneret
- 1963: René-Jean Monneret
- 1964: René-Jean Monneret
- 1965: René-Jean Monneret
- 1966: Bernard Castang
- 1967: Bernard Castang
- 1968: Charlemagne Anyamah
- 1969: Charlemagne Anyamah
- 1970: Sylvio Hodos
- 1971: Yves Le Roy
- 1972: Yves Le Roy
- 1973: Yves Le Roy
- 1974: Yves Le Roy
- 1975: Bruce Jenner (USA)
- 1976: Gilles Gemise-Farreau
- 1977: Yves Le Roy
- 1978: Yves Le Roy
- 1979: Gilles Delaune
- 1980: Jean-Philippe Sommero
- 1981: Yves Le Roy
- 1982: Didier Claverie
- 1983: Didier Claverie
- 1984: Frédéric Sacco
- 1985: William Motti
- 1986: Alain Blondel
- 1987: Christian Plaziat
- 1988: Christian Plaziat
- 1989: Christian Plaziat
- 1990: Christian Plaziat
- 1991: William Motti
- 1992: Alain Blondel
- 1993: Not held
- 1994: Sébastien Levicq
- 1995: Olivier Coche
- 1996: Wilfrid Boulineau
- 1997: Lionel Marceny
- 1998: Gaëtan Blouin
- 1999: Cédric Lopez
- 2000: Laurent Hernu
- 2001: Gaëtan Blouin
- 2002: Laurent Hernu
- 2003: Laurent Hernu
- 2004: Gaëtan Blouin
- 2005: Romain Barras
- 2006: Nadir El Fassi

=== 20 kilometres walk ===
Prior to 1966, there were two French championships in the 20 km: one held on roads by the French Athletics Federation and another held on tracks by the Union Française de Marche (French Walking Union). Since then the championship has mostly been a road one, bar a period as a track walk from 1977 to 1988, plus a 1995 track championship.

- 1960F: Henri Delerue
- 1960U: Marceau Gouaille
- 1961F: Henri Delerue
- 1961U: Eugène Legat
- 1962F: Henri Delerue
- 1962U: Eugène Legat
- 1963F: Henri Delerue
- 1963U: Roger Hennebois
- 1964F: Henri Delerue
- 1964U: Eugène Legat
- 1965F: Henri Delerue
- 1965U: Louis Lebacquer
- 1966: Henri Delerue
- 1967: Henri Delerue
- 1968: Henri Delerue
- 1969: Henri Delerue
- 1970: Jacques Arnoux
- 1971: Jacques Arnoux
- 1972: Gérard Lelièvre
- 1973: Gérard Lelièvre
- 1974: Gérard Lelièvre
- 1975: Gérard Lelièvre
- 1976: Gérard Lelièvre
- 1977: Gérard Lelièvre
- 1978: Gérard Lelièvre
- 1979: Gérard Lelièvre
- 1980: Gérard Lelièvre
- 1981: Gérard Lelièvre
- 1982: Gérard Lelièvre
- 1983: Gérard Lelièvre
- 1984: Gérard Lelièvre
- 1985: Philippe Lafleur
- 1986: Martial Fesselier
- 1987: Martial Fesselier
- 1988: Martial Fesselier
- 1989: Thierry Toutain
- 1990: Thierry Toutain
- 1991: Thierry Toutain
- 1992: Jean-Claude Corre
- 1993: Denis Langlois
- 1994: Thierry Toutain
- 1995: Robert Korzeniowski (POL)
- 1996: Thierry Toutain
- 1997: Pascal Servanty
- 1998: Denis Langlois
- 1999: Denis Langlois
- 2000: Denis Langlois
- 2001: Denis Langlois
- 2002: Denis Langlois
- 2003: Denis Langlois
- 2004: Denis Langlois
- 2005: Denis Langlois
- 2006: Denis Langlois

=== 50 kilometres walk ===
Prior to 1965, there were two French championships in the 50 km: one held by the French Athletics Federation and another held by the Union Française de Marche (French Walking Union). Both championships were held on the road, bar a one-off 50 km track walk in 1981.

- 1960F: Jacques Arnoux
- 1960U: Roger Bedée
- 1961F: Jacques Arnoux
- 1961U: Roger Bedée
- 1962F: Gilbert Belin
- 1962U: Roger Hennebois
- 1963F: Jacques Arnoux
- 1963U: Claude Bedée
- 1964F: Jacques Arnoux
- 1964U: Albert Jamier
- 1965: Gilbert Belin
- 1966: Jacques Arnoux
- 1967: Henri Delerue
- 1968: Henri Delerue
- 1969: Henri Delerue
- 1970: Guy Bailly
- 1971: Nesty Fischer
- 1972: Jean-Claude Decosse
- 1973: Gérard Lelièvre
- 1974: Gérard Lelièvre
- 1975: Gérard Lelièvre
- 1976: Gérard Lelièvre
- 1977: Gérard Lelièvre
- 1978: Dominique Guebey
- 1979: Gérard Lelièvre
- 1980: Gérard Lelièvre
- 1981: Gérard Lelièvre
- 1982: Gérard Lelièvre
- 1983: Gérard Lelièvre
- 1984: Dominique Guebey
- 1985: Martial Fesselier
- 1986: Eric Neisse
- 1987: Denis Terraz
- 1988: Thierry Toutain
- 1989: René Piller
- 1990: René Piller
- 1991: Martial Fesselier
- 1992: René Piller
- 1993: Thierry Toutain
- 1994: René Piller
- 1995: René Piller
- 1996: Robert Korzeniowski (POL)
- 1997: Thierry Toutain
- 1998: Denis Langlois
- 1999: Denis Langlois
- 2000: Sylvain Caudron
- 2001: Denis Langlois
- 2002: Eddy Riva
- 2003: Eddy Riva
- 2004: David Boulanger
- 2005: Yohann Diniz

=== Cross country (long) ===
- 1960: Rhadi Ben Abdesselam (MAR)
- 1961: Michel Bernard
- 1962: Michel Jazy
- 1963: Robert Bogey
- 1964: Jean Fayolle
- 1965: Michel Jazy
- 1966: Michel Jazy
- 1967: Noël Tijou
- 1968: Jean Wadoux
- 1969: Noël Tijou
- 1970: Noël Tijou
- 1971: Noël Tijou
- 1972: Jean Wadoux
- 1973: Noël Tijou
- 1974: Lucien Rault
- 1975: Noël Tijou
- 1976: Jacky Boxberger
- 1977: Noël Tijou
- 1978: Dominique Coux
- 1979: Pierre Lévisse
- 1980: Dominique Coux
- 1981: Alexandre Gonzalez
- 1982: Thierry Watrice
- 1983: Jacky Boxberger
- 1984: Pierre Lévisse
- 1985: Pierre Lévisse
- 1986: Pierre Lévisse
- 1987: Paul Arpin
- 1988: Paul Arpin
- 1989: Paul Arpin
- 1990: Thierry Pantel
- 1991: Bruno Le Stum
- 1992: Tony Rapisarda
- 1993: Abdellah Béhar
- 1994: Mustapha Essaïd
- 1995: Bertrand Fréchard
- 1996: Mustapha Essaïd
- 1997: Abdellah Béhar
- 1998: Driss El Himer
- 1999: Driss El Himer
- 2000: Abdellah Béhar
- 2001: Driss El Himer
- 2002: Mustapha Essaïd
- 2003: Driss El Himer
- 2004: El Hassan Lahssini
- 2005: Driss El Himer
- 2006: Khalid Zoubaa

=== Cross country (short) ===
- 1998: Driss Maazouzi
- 1999: Driss Maazouzi
- 2000: Driss Maazouzi
- 2001: Lyes Ramoul
- 2002: Driss Maazouzi
- 2003: Rachid Chékhémani
- 2004: Aléxis Abraham
- 2005: Mokhtar Benhari
- 2006: Moussa Barkaoui

=== Mountain running ===
- 1989: Aimé Arnaud
- 1990: Thierry Icart
- 1991: Jean-Paul Payet
- 1992: Aziz Nih
- 1993: Jean-Paul Payet
- 1994: Jean-Paul Payet
- 1995: Thierry Icart
- 1996: Thierry Breuil
- 1997: Thierry Breuil
- 1998: Sylvain Richard
- 1999: Arnaud Fourdin
- 2000: Arnaud Fourdin
- 2001: Raymond Fontaine
- 2002: Raymond Fontaine
- 2003: Régis Roux
- 2004: Raymond Fontaine
- 2005: Raymond Fontaine

=== 10K run ===
- 1996: Benoît Zwierzchiewski
- 1997: Mustapha Essaïd
- 1998: Benoît Zwierzchiewski
- 1999: Tony Martins
- 2000: Driss El Himer
- 2001: Abdellah Béhar
- 2002: Mohamed Ouaadi
- 2003: Tarik Bouzid
- 2004: El Hassan Lahssini
- 2005: El Hassan Lahssini

=== Half marathon ===
- 1992: Tony Rapisarda
- 1993: Bruno Léger
- 1994: Bertrand Fréchard
- 1995: Bruno Léger
- 1996: Abdi Djama
- 1997: Abdi Djama
- 1998: Mohamed Ouaadi
- 1999: Abdellah Béhar
- 2000: Mohamed Serbouti
- 2001: Abdelgani Lahlali
- 2002: Mickaël Thomas
- 2003: Abdelgani Lahlali
- 2004: Abdelhakim Bagy
- 2005: David Ramard

=== 25K ===
- 1984: Michel Delaby
- 1985: Jacky Boxberger
- 1986: Jean-Claude Louison
- 1987: Bertrand Itsweire
- 1988: Pierre Lévisse
- 1989: Bertrand Itsweire
- 1990: Dominique Chauvelier
- 1991: Pascal Depret

=== 100K run ===
- 1982: Jean-Marc Bellocq
- 1983: Claude Ansard
- 1984: Claude Ansard
- 1985: Bruno Scelsi
- 1986: Bruno Scelsi
- 1987: Bruno Scelsi
- 1988: Jean-Marc Bellocq
- 1989: Bruno Scelsi
- 1990: Denis Gack
- 1991: Roland Vuillemenot
- 1992: Roland Vuillemenot
- 1993: Roland Vuillemenot
- 1994: Bernard Curton
- 1995: Roland Vuillemenot
- 1996: Roland Vuillemenot
- 1997: Yves Laissu
- 1998: Gilles Diehl
- 1999: Pascal Fétizon
- 2000: Jean-Marie Gehin
- 2001: Pascal Fétizon
- 2002: Thierry Guichard
- 2003: Mohamed Magroun
- 2004: Yannick Djouadi
- 2005: Stéphane Roullier
- 2006: Jean-Jacques Moros

=== 24-hour run ===
The French Championships in 24-hour run was held twice in 2005.

- 1992: Maurice Mondon
- 1993: Jean-Pierre Guyomarc'h
- 1994: Marcel Foucat
- 1995: Jean-Pierre Guyomarc'h
- 1996: Marcel Foucat
- 1997: Jean-Pierre Guyomarc'h
- 1998: Alain Prual
- 1999: Alain Prual
- 2000: Alain Prual
- 2001: Alain Prual
- 2002: Alain Prual
- 2003: Alain Prual
- 2004: Emmanuel Conraux
- 2005 (a): Mohamed Magroun
- 2005 (b): Mohamed Magroun

== External sources ==
- List of French Athletics Championships winners on the Fédération française d'athlétisme's website
- List of French Athletics Championships winners (1960—2006) on www.gbrathletics.com
