= 1968 International Cross Country Championships =

- Organisers: ICCU
- Edition: 55th
- Date: March 17 (men) / March 23 (women)
- Host city: Tunis, Tunisia (men); Blackburn, Lancashire, England (women)
- Venue: Hippodrome de Kassar-Said (men); Witton Park (women)
- Events: 2 / 1
- Distances: 7.5 mi (12.1 km) men 4.35 mi (7.0 km) junior men 2.8 mi (4.5 km) women
- Participation: 177 athletes from 14 nations

The 1968 International Cross Country Championships was held in Tunis, Tunisia, at the Hippodrome de Kassar-Said on March 17, 1968. The women's championship was held one week later in Blackburn, England at the Witton Country Park on March 23, 1968. A report on the men's event as well as on the women's event was given in the Glasgow Herald.

Complete results for men, junior men, women, medallists, and the results of British athletes were published.

== Medallists ==
Event	Gold		Silver		Bronze	
Individual
Men; 7.5 mi (12.1 km)	Mohamed Gammoudi; Tunisia	35:25.4	Ron Hill; England	35:26.8	Roy Fowler; England	35:31.8
Junior Men; 4.35 mi (7.0 km)	John Bednarski; England	20:59	Pierre de Freyn; Belgium	21:00	Mohamed Omar; Morocco	21:02
Women; 2.8 mi (4.5 km)	Doris Brown; United States	15:00	Vicki Foltz; United States	15:12	Pamela Davies; England	15:21
Team
Men	England	58	France	101	Spain	129
Junior Men	England	10	Tunisia	27	Morocco	29
Women	United States	19	England	20	Scotland	55

== Individual Race Results ==
=== Men's (7.5 mi / 12.1 km) ===
Rank	Athlete	Nationality	Time
1st place, gold medalist(s)	Mohamed Gammoudi	Tunisia	35:25.4
2nd place, silver medalist(s)	Ron Hill	England	35:26.8
3rd place, bronze medalist(s)	Roy Fowler	England	35:31.8
4	Guy Texereau	France	35:34.6
5	Mike Freary	England	35:40
6	Mariano Haro	Spain	35:40
7	Alan Rushmer	England	35:42.6
8	Ahmed Zammel	Tunisia	35:47
9	Noel Tijou	France	35:48
10	Ian McCafferty	Scotland	36:08
11	Derek Graham	Northern Ireland	36:13
12	José Maiz	Spain	36:14
13	Javier Álvarez	Spain	36:15
14	René Jourdan	France	36:18
15	Lucien Rault	France	36:19.4
16	Jim Hogan	England	36:22
17	Mohamed Said	Morocco	36:24.8
18	Lachie Stewart	Scotland	36:26
19	Andy Brown	Scotland	36:27
20	Jim Wright	Scotland	36:28.4
21	Iluminado Corcuera	Spain	36:29
22	Larbi Oukada	Morocco	36:29.6
23	Jim Alder	Scotland	36:32
24	Ben Assou El Ghazi	Morocco	36:33
25	Bill Adcocks	England	36:38
26	Carlos Pérez	Spain	36:43
27	Bill Clark	United States	36:45
28	Walter Huss	Switzerland	36:45.2
29	Bernard Maroquin	France	36:52.4
30	Michel Bernard	France	36:55.8
31	Gaston Roelants	Belgium	36:58
32	Mhedheb Hannachi	Tunisia	36:59.2
33	Haddou Jaddour	Morocco	37:04.4
34	Herb Lorenz	United States	37:06
35	Tony Cox	England	37:07
36	Don Lakin	United States	37:08.2
37	Moha Aït Bassou	Morocco	37:09
38	Alan Joslyn	Wales	37:10.4
39	Tom Heinonen	United States	37:11
40	Roger Clark	England	37:14
41	Doug Wiebe	United States	37:16.4
42	Ammar Khemiri	Tunisia	37:24.8
43	Gérard Vervoort	France	37:25
44	Dennis Quinlan	Ireland	37:26
45	Hammadi Ben Mohamed	Morocco	37:27.4
46	Matt Murphy	Ireland	37:29
47	Gareth Bryan-Jones	Scotland	37:31
48	Tom O'Riordan	Ireland	37:31.6
49	Robert Folie	Belgium	37:32
50	Pierre de Pauw	Belgium	37:35.2
51	Ramon Tasende	Spain	37:36
52	Francisco Aritmendi	Spain	37:38.4
53	Mohamed Ben Abdelsalem	Morocco	37:43.4
54	Jean-Pierre Delloye	Belgium	37:48.2
55	Werner Dössegger	Switzerland	37:50
56	Fernando Aguilar	Spain	37:51
57	John Linaker	Scotland	37:52.6
58	Leon Moreels	Belgium	37:54.2
59	Alan Jones	Wales	37:56.6
60	Hedydd Davies	Wales	38:02.4
61	Yves Martinage	France	38:03
62	Johan Janssens	Belgium	38:04.2
63	Alfons Sidler	Switzerland	38:07.6
64	Albien van Holsbeek	Belgium	38:09.2
65	Werner Wildschek	Switzerland	38:13.4
66	Donal Walsh	Ireland	38:15.6
67	Alec Brown	Scotland	38:16
68	Roy Kernoghan	Northern Ireland	38:17.4
69	Bill Reilly	United States	38:22.6
70	Walter Dietiker	Switzerland	38:23
71	Abdelkader Zaddem	Tunisia	38:26
72	Joe O'Keefe	Ireland	38:28.2
73	Hamdouni Sghaier	Tunisia	38:44.6
74	Hansruedi Knill	Switzerland	38:46
75	Abdallah Ben Ammar	Tunisia	38:47.6
76	Lorenzo Gutierrez	Spain	38:50.4
77	Matt Wilson	Northern Ireland	38:54
78	Mike Teer	Northern Ireland	38:55.6
79	Hans Rüdisühli	Switzerland	39:10
80	Abderrahmane Delhoum	Algeria	39:11.2
81	Frank Briscoe	England	39:27
82	Moses Mayfield	United States	39:30.2
83	Malcolm Edger	Northern Ireland	39:43
84	John Buckley	Ireland	39:47
85	Guenaoui Behloul	Algeria	39:50
86	Patrick Leddy	Ireland	39:54
87	Cyril Leigh	Wales	40:08
88	Kamali Benmissi	Algeria	40:10
89	Mohamed Gouasmi	Algeria	40:10.6
90	David Logue	Northern Ireland	40:13
91	Mel Evans	Wales	40:27
92	Alistair Blamire	Scotland	40:29
93	Jeff Kirby	Wales	41:02
94	Gérard Goutailler	France	41:35
95	Mustapha Lerari	Algeria	41:36
96	Aissa Benfarès	Algeria	41:37
97	Chris Loosley	Wales	41:48
98	Bali	Algeria	41:48
99	Ian Morrison	Northern Ireland	41:52
100	Belgacem Harrathi	Tunisia	42:07
—	Eugène Allonsius	Belgium	DNF
—	Labidi Ayachi	Tunisia	DNF
—	Mick Molloy	Ireland	DNF
—	Willy Polleunis	Belgium	DNF
—	Ron McAndrew	Wales	DNF
—	Alfred Chivers	Northern Ireland	DNF
—	Seboui	Algeria	DNF

=== Junior Men's (4.35 mi / 7.0 km) ===
Rank	Athlete	Nationality	Time
1st place, gold medalist(s)	John Bednarski	England	20:59,6
2nd place, silver medalist(s)	Pierre de Freyn	Belgium	21:00,6
3rd place, bronze medalist(s)	Mohamed Omar	Morocco	21:02,6
4	Don Faircloth	England	21:07,2
5	Andy Holden	England	21:07,2
6	Ian Stewart	England	21:13,8
7	Tony Simmons	Wales	21:26,6
8	Hamida Gamoudi	Tunisia	21:32
9	Amor Lassoued	Tunisia	21:34
10	Mansour Guettaya	Tunisia	21:39
11	Oujid Abdellah	Morocco	21:54
12	Pierre van Heddegem	Belgium	21:57
13	Norman Morrison	Scotland	21:59
14	Angel Cob	Spain	22:02,6
15	Mohamed Benachir	Morocco	22:08
16	Mohamed El Ayachi	Morocco	22:09,6
17	Martin McMahon	Scotland	22:12,6
18	James Cook	Scotland	22:19,4
19	Ali Dali	Libya	22:28,8
20	Julio Gude	Spain	22:34
21	Tahar Bounab	Algeria	22:35
22	Bernie Hayward	Wales	22:36,6
23	Manuel Alcudia	Spain	22:41
24	Karel Lismont	Belgium	22:44,2
25	Juan José Sordo	Spain	22:46,6
26	Boualem Rahoui	Algeria	22:52,8
27	Mohamed Benslimane	Algeria	22:53
28	John Calvert	England	22:56
29	Noureddine Hamouda	Tunisia	22:58
30	Andres Jimeno	Spain	23:08
31	Alan Beaney	Scotland	23:13,2
32	Gwynn Davis	Wales	23:19,8
33	Roland Verstraeten	Belgium	23:31,2
34	John Powell	Wales	23:38
35	Tom Paterson	Scotland	23:42,6
36	Ali Ahmed Baccouch	Libya	23:47
37	Mohamed Kacemi	Algeria	24:00,2
38	Mehdi Ali	Libya	24:01
39	Hassen Kachroudi	Tunisia	24:43,6
40	Ahmed Zbaidi	Morocco	24:54,4

=== Women's (2.8 mi / 4.5 km) ===
Rank	Athlete	Nationality	Time
1st place, gold medalist(s)	Doris Brown	United States	15:00
2nd place, silver medalist(s)	Vicki Foltz	United States	15:12
3rd place, bronze medalist(s)	Pamela Davies	England	15:21
4	Anne Smith	England	15:24
5	Linda Mayfield	United States	15:43
6	Patricia Brown	England	15:47
7	Phyllis Perkins	England	15:53
8	Ann O'Brien	Ireland	15:56
9	Sheila Taylor	England	16:05
10	Ursula Kennedy	Ireland	16:10
11	Cheryl Bridges	United States	16:11
12	Doreen King	Scotland	16:14
13	Margaret MacSherry	Scotland	16:18
14	Dale Greig	Scotland	16:18
15	Thelwyn Bateman	Wales	16:23
16	Leslie Watson	Scotland	16:27
17	Rosemary Stirling	Scotland	16:39
18	Natalie Roche	United States	16:50
19	Sheena Fitzmaurice	Scotland	16:52
20	June Hale	England	17:12
21	Ann Keating	Ireland	17:15
22	Gloria Dourass	Wales	17:21
23	Margaret Doody	Ireland	17:25
24	Siobhan Lynch	Ireland	17:29
25	Jean Lochhead	Wales	17:33
26	Lori Schutt	United States	17:38
27	Delyth Davies	Wales	17:41
28	Janet Eynon	Wales	18:33
29	Eileen Kelly	Ireland	18:47
30	Meryl Priestley	Wales	18:59

== Team Results ==
=== Men's ===
Rank	Country	Team	Points
1	England	Ron Hill; Roy Fowler; Mike Freary; Alan Rushmer; Jim Hogan; Bill Adcocks	58
2	France	Guy Texereau; Noel Tijou; René Jourdan; Lucien Rault; Bernard Maroquin; Michel Bernard	101
3	Spain	Mariano Haro; José Maiz; Javier Álvarez; Iluminado Corcuera; Carlos Pérez; Ramon Tasende	129
4	Scotland	Ian McCafferty; Lachie Stewart; Andy Brown; Jim Wright; Jim Alder; Gareth Bryan-Jones	137
5	Morocco	Mohamed Said; Larbi Oukada; Ben Assou El Ghazi; Haddou Jaddour; Moha Aït Bassou; Hammadi Ben Mohamed	178
6	Tunisia	Mohamed Gammoudi; Ahmed Zammel; Mhedheb Hannachi; Ammar Khemiri; Abdelkader Zaddem; Hamdouni Sghaier	227
7	United States	Bill Clark; Herb Lorenz; Don Lakin; Tom Heinonen; Doug Wiebe; Bill Reilly	246
8	Belgium	Gaston Roelants; Robert Folie; Pierre de Pauw; Jean-Pierre Delloye; Leon Moreels; Johan Janssens	304
9	Switzerland	Walter Huss; Werner Dössegger; Alfons Sidler; Werner Wildschek; Walter Dietiker; Hansruedi Knill	355
10	Ireland	Dennis Quinlan; Matt Murphy; Tom O'Riordan; Donal Walsh; Joe O'Keefe; John Buckley	360
11	Northern Ireland	Derek Graham; Roy Kernoghan; Matt Wilson; Mike Teer; Malcolm Edger; David Logue	407
12	Wales	Alan Joslyn; Alan Jones; Hedydd Davies; Cyril Leigh; Mel Evans; Jeff Kirby	428
13	Algeria	Abderrahmane Delhoum; Guenaoui Behloul; Kamali Benmissi; Mohamed Gouasmi; Mustapha Lerari; Aissa Benfarès	533

=== Junior Men's ===
Rank	Country	Team	Points
1	England	John Bednarski; Don Faircloth; Andy Holden	10
2	Tunisia	Hamida Gamoudi; Amor Lassoued; Mansour Guettaya	27
3	Morocco	Mohamed Omar; Oujid Abdellah; Mohamed Benachir	29
4	Belgium	Pierre de Freyn; Pierre van Heddegem; Karel Lismont	38
5	Scotland	Norman Morrison; Martin McMahon; James Cook	48
6	Spain	Angel Cob; Julio Gude; Manuel Alcudia	57
7	Wales	Tony Simmons; Bernie Hayward; Gwynn Davis	61
8	Algeria	Tahar Bounab; Boualem Rahoui; Mohamed Benslimane	74
9	Libya	Ali Dali; Ali Ahmed Baccouch; Mehdi Ali	93

=== Women's ===
Rank	Country	Team	Points
1	United States	Doris Brown; Vicki Foltz; Linda Mayfield; Cheryl Bridges	19
2	England	Pamela Davies; Anne Smith; Patricia Brown; Phyllis Perkins	20
3	Scotland	Doreen King; Margaret MacSherry; Dale Greig; Leslie Watson	55
4	Ireland	Ann O'Brien; Ursula Kennedy; Ann Keating; Margaret Doody	62
5	Wales	Thelwyn Bateman; Gloria Dourass; Jean Lochhead; Delyth Davies	89

== Participation ==
An unofficial count yields the participation of 177 athletes from 14 countries.

- Algeria (12)
- Belgium (13)
- England (20)
- France (9)
- Ireland (14)
- Libya (3)
- Morocco (12)
- Northern Ireland (8)
- Scotland (20)
- Spain (14)
- Switzerland (7)
- Tunisia (14)
- United States (13)
- Wales (18)

== See also ==
- 1968 in athletics (track and field)
