= 1969 International Cross Country Championships =

- Organisers: ICCU
- Edition: 56th
- Date: 22 March
- Host city: Clydebank, Dunbartonshire, Scotland
- Venue: Dalmuir Park
- Events: 3
- Distances: 7.5 mi (12.0 km) men 4.35 mi (7.0 km) junior men 2.5 mi (4.0 km) women
- Participation: 193 athletes from 14 nations

The 1969 International Cross Country Championships was held in Clydebank, Scotland, at the Dalmuir Park on 22 March 1969. A report on the men's event was given in the Glasgow Herald.

Complete results for men, junior men, women, medallists, and the results of British athletes were published.

== Medallists ==
Event	Gold		Silver		Bronze	
Individual
Men; 7.5 mi (12.0 km)	Gaston Roelants; Belgium	36:25	Dick Taylor; England	36:44	Ian McCafferty; Scotland	36:57
Junior Men; 4.35 mi (7.0 km)	Dave Bedford; England	19:38	John Bednarski; England	19:59	John Harrison; England	20:13
Women; 2.5 mi (4.0 km)	Doris Brown; United States	14:46	Maureen Dickson; United States	14:51	Valerie Robinson; New Zealand	14:58
Team
Men	England	57	France	121	Belgium	125
Junior Men	England	6	Ireland	21	Spain	27
Women	United States	23	New Zealand	35	England	37

== Individual Race Results ==
=== Men's (7.5 mi / 12.0 km) ===
Rank	Athlete	Nationality	Time
1st place, gold medalist(s)	Gaston Roelants	Belgium	36:25
2nd place, silver medalist(s)	Dick Taylor	England	36:44
3rd place, bronze medalist(s)	Ian McCafferty	Scotland	36:57
4	Mike Tagg	England	36:59
5	Noel Tijou	France	37:14
6	René Jourdan	France	37:24
7	Rex Maddaford	New Zealand	37:28
8	Tim Johnston	England	37:33
9	Jean Wadoux	France	37:37
10	Mariano Haro	Spain	37:39
11	Bill Clark	United States	37:41
12	Mike Turner	England	37:44
13	Euan Robertson	New Zealand	37:50
14	Trevor Wright	England	37:53
15	Willy Polleunis	Belgium	37:56
16	Lucien Rault	France	37:57
17	Bob Richardson	England	38:01
18	Moha Aït Bassou	Morocco	38:04
19	Gaston Heleven	Belgium	38:05
20	Lachie Stewart	Scotland	38:06
21	Eugène Allonsius	Belgium	38:09
22	Gavin Thorley	New Zealand	38:10
23	Fergus Murray	Scotland	38:11
24	Andy Holden	England	38:12
25	Derek Graham	Northern Ireland	38:14
26	Gerry Stevens	England	38:15
27	Javier Álvarez	Spain	38:16
28	Ben Assou El Ghazi	Morocco	38:17
29	Carlos Pérez	Spain	38:18
30	Moumoh Haddou	Morocco	38:18
31	Tracy Smith	United States	38:19
32	Mike Baxter	England	38:20
33	Malcolm Thomas	Wales	38:20
34	Albien Van Holsbeeck	Belgium	38:22
35	Paul Thys	Belgium	38:23
36	Dick Wedlock	Scotland	38:25
37	Barry Everitt	New Zealand	38:26
38	Gilbert Gauthier	France	38:27
39	Bryan Rose	New Zealand	38:29
40	José Maiz	Spain	38:35
41	Leon Moreels	Belgium	38:37
42	John Robinson	New Zealand	38:38
43	Gareth Bryan-Jones	Scotland	38:41
44	Mohamed Ben Abdelsalem	Morocco	38:46
45	Fernando Aguilar	Spain	38:47
46	Paddy Coyle	Ireland	38:48
47	Jean-Pierre Ouine	France	38:48
48	Charles Messenger	United States	38:49
49	Henri Lepape	France	38:50
50	Mhedheb Hannachi	Tunisia	38:52
51	Eddy van Butsele	Belgium	38:56
52	Ramon Tasende	Spain	38:57
53	M'Barek Ahdib	Morocco	38:57
54	Bill Mullett	Scotland	38:58
55	Haddou Jaddour	Morocco	39:00
56	Enrique Graña Pérez	Spain	39:00
57	Eddie Gray	New Zealand	39:03
58	Danny McDaid	Ireland	39:06
59	Bouabib Chaoui	Morocco	39:06
60	Tom O'Riordan	Ireland	39:07
61	Tony Simmons	Wales	39:08
62	Labidi Ayachi	Tunisia	39:09
63	Robert Finlay	Canada	39:10
64	Hamida Addéche	France	39:12
65	Cyril Leigh	Wales	39:14
66	Grant McLaren	Canada	39:22
67	David Sirl	New Zealand	39:23
68	Bernie Plain	Wales	39:24
69	John Campbell	New Zealand	39:31
70	Paul Darney	Wales	39:33
71	Sean O'Sullivan	Ireland	39:35
72	Josef Wirth	Switzerland	39:39
73	Mohamed Belhoucine	Morocco	39:44
74	Don Macgregor	Scotland	39:45
75	Alan Jones	Wales	39:47
76	Dennis Quinlan	Ireland	39:48
77	Abdelkader Zaddem	Tunisia	39:50
78	Jim Timoney	Ireland	39:54
79	S. Abbi	Morocco	39:56
80	Mick Hickey	Ireland	39:57
81	Dave Atkinson	Canada	39:59
82	Jim Murphy	United States	40:07
83	David Logue	Northern Ireland	40:11
84	Brian Bisson	Canada	40:11
85	Cyril Pennington	Northern Ireland	40:13
86	Patrick Leddy	Ireland	40:18
87	Ammar Khemiri	Tunisia	40:25
88	Malcolm Edger	Northern Ireland	40:25
89	John Jones	Wales	40:31
90	John Kelly	Ireland	40:36
91	Nick Barton	Wales	40:41
92	Adelaziz Bouguerra	Tunisia	40:44
93	Hamdouni Sghaier	Tunisia	40:45
94	Brian Armstrong	Canada	40:45
95	Bill Norris	United States	40:48
96	Iluminado Corcuera	Spain	40:54
97	Jeff Kirby	Wales	41:01
98	Jim Wright	Scotland	41:21
99	Mike Teer	Northern Ireland	41:36
100	Roy Kernoghan	Northern Ireland	41:38
101	David Wighton	Canada	41:52
102	Tom Heinonen	United States	42:03
103	John Ecclestone	Canada	42:15
104	Ian Morrison	Northern Ireland	42:18
105	Chris McCubbins	United States	42:31
106	Stan Vennard	Northern Ireland	
107	Kevin McCormick	Northern Ireland	
—	Jim Alder	Scotland	DNF
—	Mohamed Gammoudi	Tunisia	DNF
—	Juan Hidalgo	Spain	DNF
—	Jean-Jacques Prianon	France	DNF
—	Yvo van Nuffelen	Belgium	DNF

=== Junior Men's (4.35 mi / 7.0 km) ===
Rank	Athlete	Nationality	Time
1st place, gold medalist(s)	Dave Bedford	England	19:38
2nd place, silver medalist(s)	John Bednarski	England	19:59
3rd place, bronze medalist(s)	John Harrison	England	20:13
4	John Hartnett	Ireland	20:28
5	Julio Gude	Spain	20:42
6	Eddie Leddy	Ireland	20:45
7	Peter Standing	England	20:51
8	Felipe de los Bueis	Spain	20:55
9	David Gillanders	Scotland	20:59
10	Moha Ouali	Morocco	21:00
11	Pat Gilseman	Ireland	21:01
12	Mohamed Omar	Morocco	21:02
13	Amakdouf Layachi	Morocco	21:03
14	José Vázquez	Spain	21:04
15	Anthony Moore	England	21:10
16	Denis Price	Northern Ireland	21:10
17	M. Belakri	Morocco	21:11
18	Daniel Murphy	Ireland	21:12
19	Julien Devos	Belgium	21:13
20	Luc Lievens	Belgium	21:14
21	Hubert Valkeneers	Belgium	21:20
22	Tom Price	Northern Ireland	21:25
23	Frank Thomas	Wales	21:28
24	Brian Morrison	Scotland	21:29
25	Rafael García	Spain	21:34
26	John Allen	Northern Ireland	21:36
27	Dennis Fowles	Wales	21:37
28	John Shine	Ireland	21:37
29	Frank Sanders	Belgium	21:56
30	Albert Atkinson	Northern Ireland	22:02
31	Willem Meyers	Belgium	22:03
32	George Jarvie	Scotland	22:04
33	A. Boumezguid	Morocco	22:08
34	John Robinson	Northern Ireland	22:09
35	Bob Sercombe	Wales	22:20
36	Bonifacio Maestro	Spain	22:27
37	Tony Pretty	Wales	22:35
38	Alan Beaney	Scotland	22:42
39	John Mescall	Wales	23:40
40	Ian Picken	Scotland	23:48

=== Women's (2.5 mi / 4.0 km) ===
Rank	Athlete	Nationality	Time
1st place, gold medalist(s)	Doris Brown	United States	14:46
2nd place, silver medalist(s)	Maureen Dickson	United States	14:51
3rd place, bronze medalist(s)	Val Robinson	New Zealand	14:58
4	Cheryl Bridges	United States	15:00
5	Ann O'Brien	Ireland	15:03
6	Phyllis Lowis	England	15:15
7	Millie Sampson	New Zealand	15:17
8	Margaret Beacham	England	15:23
9	Pamela Davies	England	15:24
10	Peggy Mullins	Ireland	15:27
11	Thelwyn Bateman	Wales	15:28
12	Carol Russell	New Zealand	15:29
13	Kathy McHugh	New Zealand	15:30
14	Joyce Smith	England	15:31
15	Madeline Ibbotson	England	15:33
16	Vicki Foltz	United States	15:34
17	Judy Oliver	United States	15:38
18	Margaret MacSherry	Scotland	15:40
19	Mary Stearns	United States	15:45
20	Ursula Kennedy	Ireland	15:54
21	Abby Hoffman	Canada	16:00
22	Susan Foster	Scotland	16:00
23	Jean Lochhead	Wales	16:07
24	Sylvia Arnold	England	16:10
25	Sandra Kirk	Scotland	16:14
26	Nuala Bowe	Ireland	16:15
27	Deirdre Foreman	Ireland	16:15
28	Thelma Fynn	Canada	16:15
29	Sheena Fitzmaurice	Scotland	16:20
30	Linda James	Canada	16:24
31	Maureen Wilton	Canada	16:27
32	Georgena Craig	Scotland	16:38
33	Jennifer Horton	New Zealand	16:43
34	Leslie Watson	Scotland	16:54
35	Rita Gorton	Wales	17:04
36	Bronwen Smith	Wales	17:05
37	Emily Hopkins	Ireland	17:11
38	Diane Dixey	New Zealand	17:15
39	Delyth Davies	Wales	17:45
40	Janet Eynon	Wales	17:40
—	Doreen Martens	Canada	DNF

== Team Results ==
=== Men's ===
Rank	Country	Team	Points
1	England	Dick Taylor; Mike Tagg; Tim Johnston; Mike Turner; Trevor Wright; Bob Richardson	57
2	France	Noel Tijou; René Jourdan; Jean Wadoux; Lucien Rault; Gilbert Gauthier; Jean-Pierre Ouine	121
3	Belgium	Gaston Roelants / 1; Willy Polleunis / 15; Gaston Heleven / 19; Eugène Allonsius / 21; Albien Van Holsbeeck / 34; Paul Thys / 35	125
4	New Zealand	Rex Maddaford; Euan Robertson; Gavin Thorley; Barry Everitt; Bryan Rose; John Robinson	160
5	Scotland	Ian McCafferty; Lachie Stewart; Fergus Murray; Dick Wedlock; Gareth Bryan-Jones; Bill Mullett	179
6	Spain	Mariano Haro; Javier Alvarez; Carlos Pérez; José Maiz; Fernando Aguilar; Ramon Tasende	203
7	Morocco	Moha Aït Bassou; Ben Assou El Ghazi; Moumoh Haddou; Mohamed Ben Abdelsalem; M'Barek Ahdib; Haddou Jaddour	228
8	United States	Bill Clark; Tracy Smith; Charles Messenger; Jim Murphy; Bill Norris; Tom Heinonen	369
9	Wales	Malcolm Thomas; Tony Simmons; Cyril Leigh; Bernie Plain; Paul Darney; Alan Jones	372
10	Ireland	Paddy Coyle; Danny McDaid; Tom O'Riordan; Sean O'Sullivan; Dennis Quinlan; Jim Timoney	389
11	Tunisia	Mhedheb Hannachi; Labidi Ayachi; Abdelkader Zaddem; Ammar Khemiri; Adelaziz Bouguerra; Hamdouni Sghaier	461
12	Northern Ireland	Derek Graham; David Logue; Cyril Pennington; Malcolm Edger; Mike Teer; Roy Kernoghan	480
13	Canada	Robert Finlay; Grant McLaren; Dave Atkinson; Brian Bisson; Brian Armstrong; David Wighton	489

=== Junior Men's ===
Rank	Country	Team	Points
1	England	Dave Bedford; John Bednarski; John Harrison	6
2	Ireland	John Hartnett; Eddie Leddy; Pat Gilseman	21
3	Spain	Julio Gude; Felipe de los Bueis; José Vázquez	27
4	Morocco	Moha Ouali; Mohamed Omar; Amakdouf Layachi	35
5	Belgium	Julien Devos; Luc Lievens; Hubert Valkeneers	60
6	Northern Ireland	Denis Price; Tom Price; John Allen	64
7	Scotland	David Gillanders; Brian Morrison; George Jarvie	65
8	Wales	Frank Thomas; Dennis Fowles; Bob Sercombe	85

=== Women's ===
Rank	Country	Team	Points
1	United States	Doris Brown; Maureen Dickson; Cheryl Bridges; Vicki Foltz	23
2	New Zealand	Valerie Robinson; Millie Sampson; Carol Russell; Kathy McHugh	35
3	England	Phyllis Lowis; Margaret Beacham; Pamela Davies; Joyce Smith	37
4	Ireland	Ann O'Brien; Peggy Mullins; Ursula Kennedy; Nuala Bowe	61
5	Scotland	Margaret MacSherry; Susan Foster; Sandra Kirk; Sheena Fitzmaurice	94
6	Wales	Thelwyn Bateman; Jean Lochhead; Rita Gorton; Bronwen Smith	105
7	Canada	Abby Hoffman; Thelma Fynn; Linda James; Maureen Wilton	110

== Participation ==
An unofficial count yields the participation of 193 athletes from 14 countries.

- Belgium (14)
- Canada (12)
- England (20)
- France (9)
- Ireland (20)
- Morocco (14)
- New Zealand (15)
- Northern Ireland (14)
- Scotland (20)
- Spain (14)
- Switzerland (1)
- Tunisia (7)
- United States (13)
- Wales (20)

== See also ==
- 1969 in athletics (track and field)
