= 1963 International Cross Country Championships =

- Organisers: ICCU
- Edition: 50th
- Date: 17 March
- Host city: San Sebastián, Euskadi, Spain
- Venue: Lasarte Hippodrome
- Events: 2
- Distances: 7.5 mi (12.1 km) men 4.7 mi (7.5 km) junior men
- Participation: 125 athletes from 11 nations

The 1963 International Cross Country Championships was held in San Sebastián, Spain, at the Lasarte Hippodrome on 17 March 1963. The distance for the men's race was reduced from the traditional 9 miles (14.5 km) to 7.5 miles (12.1 km). A preview of the event was given in the Glasgow Herald.

Complete results for men, junior men, medalists, and the results of British athletes were published.

== Medalists ==
Event	Gold		Silver		Bronze	
Individual
Men; 7.5 mi (12.1 km)	Roy Fowler; England	37:19.7	Gaston Roelants; Belgium	37:32	Mariano Haro; Spain	37:41.6
Junior Men; 4.7 mi (7.5 km)	John Farrington; England	25:17.4	Ahmed Zammel; Tunisia	25:23.6	Lachie Stewart; Scotland	25:37.6
Team
Men	Belgium	110	France	113	England	113
Junior Men	England	12	Spain	20	Scotland	24

== Individual Race Results ==
=== Men's (7.5 mi / 12.1 km) ===
Rank	Athlete	Nationality	Time
1st place, gold medalist(s)	Roy Fowler	England	37:19.7
2nd place, silver medalist(s)	Gaston Roelants	Belgium	37:32
3rd place, bronze medalist(s)	Mariano Haro	Spain	37:41.6
4	Robert Bogey	France	37:55.6
5	Tim Johnston	England	37:58.7
6	Francisco Guardia	Spain	38:00
7	Mohamed Gammoudi	Tunisia	38:11.6
8	Henri Clerckx	Belgium	38:22.8
9	Hamoud Ameur	France	38:24.1
10	Abdeslem Bouchta	Morocco	38:24.5
11	Andy Brown	Scotland	38:26
12	Ali Khamassi	Tunisia	38:29
13	Basil Heatley	England	38:34
14	Hedwig Leenaert	Belgium	38:39
15	Pat Killeen	Ireland	38:39
16	Labidi Ayachi	Tunisia	38:42
17	Marcel Vandewattyne	Belgium	38:44
18	Michel Jazy	France	38:51
19	Tom O'Riordan	Ireland	38:52
20	Bakir Benaissa	Morocco	38:53
21	Salah Beddiaf	France	38:58
22	Tim Briault	England	39:01
23	Youssef Mastouri	Tunisia	39:04
24	Manuel Alonso	Spain	39:07.4
25	Luis García	Spain	39:08.8
26	Rhadi Ben Abdesselam	Morocco	39:10
27	Hedi Hamrouni	Tunisia	39:13
28	Noel Tijou	France	39:16
29	Denis Jouret	Belgium	39:18
30	Sean O'Sullivan	Ireland	39:19
31	Alastair Wood	Scotland	39:20
32	Fernando Aguilar	Spain	39:22.7
33	Yves Martinage	France	39:26
34	Lahcen Ben Allal	Morocco	39:27
35	Eddie Strong	England	39:28
36	John Linaker	Scotland	39:28
37	Mike Turner	England	39:28
38	Iluminado Corcuera	Spain	39:31.5
39	Mohamed Ben Mohamed	Morocco	39:33
40	Frans van der Hoeven	Belgium	39:43
41	Tomas Ballestin	Spain	39:49.9
42	Ammar Khemiri	Tunisia	39:51
43	Manuel Marques	Portugal	39:57
44	Hammadi Ben Mohamed	Morocco	39:57
45	Derek Graham	Ireland	40:01
46	Alan Simpson	England	40:02
47	Bob Roath	Wales	40:02
48	Mick Neville	Ireland	40:03
49	Jean Vaillant	France	40:04
50	Alfons Sidler	Switzerland	40:05
51	Carlos Pérez	Spain	40:07
52	Mhedheb Hannachi	Tunisia	40:07
53	Jim Hogan	Ireland	40:09
54	Jean Fayolle	France	40:11
55	Brian Craig	England	40:12
56	Mohamed Brahim	Morocco	40:14
57	Tom Cochrane	Scotland	40:18
58	Yves Jeannotat	Switzerland	40:22
59	Maximiano Pinheiro	Portugal	40:33.4
60	Mohamed Ben Abdelsalem	Morocco	40:42
61	Frank McDermott	Ireland	40:48
62	Brian Jeffs	Wales	40:49
63	Callum Laing	Scotland	40:58
64	Rachid Ben Naceur	Tunisia	41:02
65	Michael Bullivant	England	41:02
66	Walter Vanhoutte	Belgium	41:04
67	Hélio Duarte	Portugal	41:06.1
68	Robert McKay	Scotland	41:10
69	Armando Aldegalega	Portugal	41:16.4
70	Martin Craven	Scotland	41:21
71	John McDonnell	Ireland	41:32
72	Joaquim Ferreira	Portugal	41:41.6
73	Hedydd Davies	Wales	41:45
74	Manuel de Sousa	Portugal	41:49.9
75	Jean-Yves Le Flohic	France	41:56
76	Ken Flowers	Wales	42:00
77	Manuel Lopes	Portugal	42:05.3
78	Roy Profitt	Wales	42:07
79	Karl Schaller	Switzerland	42:13
80	Edgar Friedli	Switzerland	42:18
81	Norman Horrell	Wales	42:22
82	Arthur Hess	Switzerland	42:30
83	Fritz Holzer	Switzerland	42:31
84	George Matthiudis	Wales	42:47
85	Werner Fischer	Switzerland	43:24
86	Paul Knill	Switzerland	43:35
87	Joaquim Santos	Portugal	44:41.4
—	Francisco Aritmendi	Spain	DNF
—	Manuel de Oliveira	Portugal	DNF
—	Mohamed Bensaid	Morocco	DNF
—	Jean-Pierre Delloye	Belgium	DNF
—	Robert Vandendriessche	Belgium	DNF
—	Anton Signer	Switzerland	DNF
—	Abderrahman Mechraoui	Tunisia	DNF

=== Junior Men's (4.7 mi / 7.5 km) ===
Rank	Athlete	Nationality	Time
1st place, gold medalist(s)	John Farrington	England	25:17.4
2nd place, silver medalist(s)	Ahmed Zammel	Tunisia	25:23.6
3rd place, bronze medalist(s)	Lachie Stewart	Scotland	25:37.6
4	Stuart Dobson	England	25:37.8
5	Antonio Gómez Lopez	Spain	25:50.6
6	Lorenzo Gutierrez	Spain	26:01.4
7	John Hammond	England	26:01.8
8	Peter Sulston	England	26:23.2
9	Francisco Hernandez	Spain	26:37.6
10	Craig Douglas	Scotland	26:39.8
11	Alec Brown	Scotland	
12	Amara Gahlouzi	Tunisia	26:51.4
13	Pedro Sacristán	Spain	
14	Chris Loosley	Wales	
15	Bill Stitfall	Wales	
16	Guido Veereman	Belgium	
17	Freddy Vandercruyssen	Belgium	
18	Bouabib Chaoui	Morocco	
19	Habib Ben Jeddou	Tunisia	27:26.8
20	Hadj Ben Sitel	Morocco	
21	Peter Yates	England	
22	James Johnstone	Scotland	
23	Juan Ripoll	Spain	
24	A. Oulmati	Morocco	
25	Hedi Djemdjem	Tunisia	28:20.2
26	Rafael Vergauwen	Belgium	
27	Winston Bradley	Wales	
28	Fred Bell	Wales	
—	Mustapha Ferchichi	Tunisia	DNF
—	Jozef Peeters	Belgium	DNF
—	Carlos D'Haene	Belgium	DNF

== Team Results ==
=== Men's ===
Rank	Country	Team	Points
1	Belgium	Gaston Roelants; Henri Clerckx; Hedwig Leenaert; Marcel Vandewattyne; Denis Jouret; Frans van der Hoeven	110
2	France	Robert Bogey; Hamoud Ameur; Michel Jazy; Salah Beddiaf; Noel Tijou; Yves Martinage	113
3	England	Roy Fowler; Tim Johnston; Basil Heatley; Tim Briault; Eddie Strong; Mike Turner	113
4	Tunisia	Mohamed Gammoudi; Ali Khamassi; Labidi Ayachi; Youssef Mastouri; Hedi Hamrouni; Ammar Khemiri	127
5	Spain	Mariano Haro; Francisco Guardia; Manuel Alonso; Luis García; Fernando Aguilar; Iluminado Corcuera	128
6	Morocco	Abdeslem Bouchta; Bakir Benaissa; Rhadi Ben Abdesselam; Lahcen Ben Allal; Mohamed Ben Mohamed; Hammadi Ben Mohamed	173
7	Ireland	Pat Killeen; Tom O'Riordan; Sean O'Sullivan; Derek Graham; Mick Neville; Jim Hogan	210
8	Scotland	Andy Brown; Alastair Wood; John Linaker; Tom Cochrane; Callum Laing; Robert McKay	266
9	Portugal	Manuel Marques; Maximiano Pinheiro; Hélio Duarte; Armando Aldegalega; Joaquim Ferreira; Manuel de Sousa	384
10	Wales	Bob Roath; Brian Jeffs; Hedydd Davies; Ken Flowers; Roy Profitt; Norman Horrell	417
11	Switzerland	Alfons Sidler; Yves Jeannotat; Karl Schaller; Edgar Friedli; Arthur Hess; Fritz Holzer	432

=== Junior Men's ===
Rank	Country	Team	Points
1	England	John Farrington; Stuart Dobson; John Hammond	12
2	Spain	Antonio Gómez Lopez; Lorenzo Gutierrez; Francisco Hernandez	20
3	Scotland	Lachie Stewart; Craig Douglas; Alec Brown	24
4	Tunisia	Ahmed Zammel; Amara Gahlouzi; Habib Ben Jeddou	33
5	Wales	Chris Loosley; Bill Stitfall; Winston Bradley	56
6	Belgium	Guido Veereman; Freddy Vandercruyssen; Rafael Vergauwen	59
7	Morocco	Bouabib Chaoui; Hadj Ben Sitel; A. Oulmati	62

== Participation ==
An unofficial count yields the participation of 125 athletes from 11 countries.

- Belgium (14)
- England (14)
- France (9)
- Ireland (8)
- Morocco (12)
- Portugal (9)
- Scotland (11)
- Spain (14)
- Switzerland (9)
- Tunisia (14)
- Wales (11)
