= 1971 European Athletics Championships – Men's marathon =

Men's marathon event

Men's marathon at the European Athletics Championships

The men's marathon at the 1971 European Athletics Championships was held in Helsinki, Finland, on 15 August 1971.

== Medalists ==
Gold	Karel Lismont; Belgium
Silver	Trevor Wright; Great Britain
Bronze	Ron Hill; Great Britain

== Results ==
=== Final ===
15 August

Rank	Name	Nationality	Time	Notes
1st place, gold medalist(s)	Karel Lismont	Belgium	2:13:09.0	CR
2nd place, silver medalist(s)	Trevor Wright	Great Britain	2:13:59.62	
3rd place, bronze medalist(s)	Ron Hill	Great Britain	2:14:34.83	
4	Colin Kirkham	Great Britain	2:16:22.0	
5	Gaston Roelants	Belgium	2:17:48.85	
6	Pentti Rummakko	Finland	2:17:58.86	
7	Lutz Philipp	West Germany	2:18:08.6	
8	Agustín Fernández	Spain	2:18:26.6	
9	Kalle Hakkarainen	Finland	2:18:45.0	
10	Gyula Tóth	Hungary	2:18:59.6	
11	Danny McDaid	Ireland	2:19:07.2	
12	Antonio Brutti	Italy	2:19:34.8	
13	Yuriy Volkov	Soviet Union	2:19:56.6	
14	Bernard Caraby	France	2:19:59.0	
15	Armando Aldegalega	Portugal	2:20:01.2	
16	İsmail Akçay	Turkey	2:20:26.8	
17	Giacomo Marietta	Italy	2:21:30.0	
18	Fleming Kempel	Denmark	2:21:34.8	
19	Yury Velikorodnykh	Soviet Union	2:21:59.0	
20	Anatoliy Baranov	Soviet Union	2:22:16.0	
21	Zdzisław Bogusz	Poland	2:22:16.0	
22	Maurice Peiren	Belgium	2:22:36.4	
23	Juan Hidalgo	Spain	2:22:42.4	
24	Jan Wawrzuta	Poland	2:23:51.6	
25	Manfred Steffny	West Germany	2:24:05.6	
26	Jørgen Jensen	Denmark	2:24:33.2	
27	Einar Weidemann	Norway	2:24:54.0	
28	Mario Binato	Italy	2:24:57.8	
29	René Combes	France	2:25:35.6	
30	Hüseyin Aktaş	Turkey	2:25:39.8	
31	Mogens Findal	Denmark	2:26:04.2	
32	Jean-Pierre Spengler	Switzerland	2:26:12.8	
33	Carlos Pérez	Spain	2:26:53.6	
34	Bent Natvig	Norway	2:28:12.6	
35	Ulf Håkansson	Sweden	2:28:37.8	
36	Geert Jansen	Netherlands	2:29:14.4	
37	Sven-Olof Lindvall	Sweden	2:30:38.6	
38	Helmuth Kunisch	Switzerland	2:30:42.4	
39	Patrick Coyle	Ireland	2:30:45.0	
40	Josef Gwerder	Switzerland	2:33:06.6	
41	Lajos Mecser	Hungary	2:34:35.2	
	Pat McMahon	Ireland	DNF	
	Peter Fredriksson	Sweden	DNF	
	Bjarne Sletten	Norway	DNF	
	Seppo Tuominen	Finland	DNF	
	Paul Angenvoorth	West Germany	DNF	
	Nedo Farčić	Yugoslavia	DNF	
	Fernand Kolbeck	France	DNF	
	Georg Förster	Austria	DNF	
	Jürgen Busch	East Germany	DNF	
	Edward Stawiarz	Poland	DNF	
	Janos Szerenyi	Hungary	DNF	

== Participation ==
According to an unofficial count, 52 athletes from 21 countries participated in the event.

- Austria (1)
- Belgium (3)
- Denmark (3)
- East Germany (1)
- Finland (3)
- France (3)
- Hungary (3)
- Ireland (3)
- Italy (3)
- Netherlands (1)
- Norway (3)
- Poland (3)
- Portugal (1)
- Soviet Union (3)
- Spain (3)
- Sweden (3)
- Switzerland (3)
- Turkey (2)
- Great Britain (3)
- West Germany (3)
- Yugoslavia (1)
