= Lucien Rault =

French long-distance runner

Lucien Rault (born 30 March 1936 in Plouguenast) is a French long-distance runner. He represented France in the 1976 Olympics at the age of 40. He had an extensive career in cross country running with his national squad at the International Cross Country Championships and then the IAAF World Cross Country Championships. Five days before his 42nd birthday, he was the #2 runner on the French World Championship team at the 1978 IAAF World Cross Country Championships, his first world championship.

He is the current ratified world record holder in the masters M45 5000 metres. He has also held the M35 and M40 records and the M35 and M40 records at 10000 metres.

He began running at age 15. He ran in the 1964, 1968, 1969, 1970, 1971, and 1972 International Cross Country Championships, then the 1974, 1975, 1976 and 1978 IAAF World Cross Country Championships, culminating with the championship. He also won the 1973 Corrida de Houilles.

He had an example of longevity from his teammate on the early cross country teams as Olympic gold medalist Alain Mimoun was setting records into his 50s. Rault later surpassed some of Mimoun's records.

He won his first French National Championship at 10000 metres in 1973, at the age of 37. In 1974 he won the national championship in cross country. He set his M40 10000m record before the 1976 Olympics in Rennes. Sixteen days later he exactly tied the record in Villeneuve-d'Ascq, both at 28:33.4.
