= Doris Brown Heritage =

American runner (born 1942)

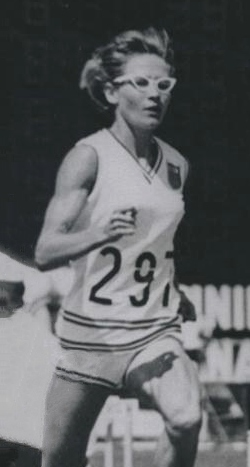
- Brown in 1967

Personal information
- Born: Doris Elaine Severtson; September 17, 1942 (age 83) Gig Harbor, Washington, U.S.
- Height: 163 cm (5 ft 4 in)
- Weight: 51 kg (112 lb)
- Spouse: Ralph Heritage

Sport
- Sport: Athletics
- Event: 400 m – marathon
- Club: Falcon Track Club, Seattle

Achievements and titles
- Personal best(s): 440 yd – 55.8 (1968); 800 m – 2:01.9 (1968); 1500 m – 4:14.6 (1971); Mile – 4:39.6 (1971); 3000 m – 9:44.6 (1970); 5000 m – 16:36.2 (1978); Mar – 2:47:35 (1976)
Medal record
Representing United States
Pan American Games
Silver medal – second place	1967 Winnipeg	800 m
Silver medal – second place	1971 Cali	800 m
International Cross Country Championships
Gold medal – first place	1967 Barry	Women's race
Gold medal – first place	1968 Tunis	Women's race
Gold medal – first place	1969 Clydebank	Women's race
Gold medal – first place	1970 Frederick	Women's race
Gold medal – first place	1971 San Sebastián	Women's race

Doris Elaine Brown Heritage (born September 17, 1942) is a retired American runner. She won the International Cross Country Championships five times in a row, in 1967–1971. She collected silver medals in the 800 m at the Pan American Games in 1967 and 1971. She placed fifth in the event at the 1968 Mexico Olympics. Brown Heritage briefly held the world record in the 3000 m in 1971. She was the first woman to clock a sub five-minute mile indoors. After retiring from competitions she had a long career as a running coach, and helped prepare the national women's team to the 1984 Summer Olympics. Brown Heritage was inducted into the National Track and Field Hall of Fame, National Track Coaches Hall of Fame and National Distance Running Hall of Fame.

== Biography ==
Born Doris Elaine Severtson, she attended Peninsula High School in Gig Harbor, Washington. As a young girl, she would go on long runs on the beach near her family's home whenever she had free time. As she grew so too did her love for running. After graduating from high school Brown attended Seattle Pacific University from 1960 to 1964 where she earned her bachelor's degree in 1964 and a master's degree in 1971.

Her career as a distance runner was off to a shaky start since she was a woman looking to be a competitor in a sport where women and longer events were still somewhat of a taboo. She was even barred from using the track while she was in Peninsula High School. So she ended up joining a local running club and set a national record in the 440-yard dash. Later she began preparing for the 800 meters, at the time longest event for women then on the Olympic program. She finished third at the 1960 Trials, but didn't qualify for the Rome Olympics. After she was accepted into Seattle Pacific University she began to run with the men's team but was not able to compete in the 1964 Olympics because of a broken foot.

In 1966, Brown became the first woman to run a sub-5 minute mile indoors, clocking 4:52. At one point in her career she held every women's national record from 440 yards up through one mile. Brown is perhaps best remembered for her five victories in the International Cross Country Championships (1967–1971), and she also represented the United States at the 1968 and 1972 Olympic Games. In 1976, Brown won the Vancouver International Marathon and placed second in the New York City Marathon.

Brown returned to her alma mater and coached track and cross country at Seattle Pacific University for four decades. She was a women's assistant coach for the national teams at the 1984 Summer Olympics and 1987 World Championships. Her middle-distance and distance runners on the track and field teams also give the Falcon track team a national reputation for excellence. Seven women have won AIAW and NCAA titles from 800 meters to 10,000 meters. Falcon men and women runners have scored at nationals 38 times in the last 28 years. Finally, in 2002, Heritage left the classroom after 33 years; she remains SPU's head cross country coach and assistant coach of track and field. Through the decades, she's made Falcon cross country runners formidable foes in NCAA Division II. Named conference coach of the year seven times, she's coached 10 of her cross-country teams to the top 10 at national meets. In 1996, the women's cross country team became the West Region women's champion. SPU has won the conference women's championships seven of the last 12 years, and she guided the men's team to the Great Northwest Athletic Conference title in 2004. Twenty of her runners have been named All-Americans, including two national champions.

Brown was the second female inducted into U.S. Track & Field and Cross Country Coaches Association Hall of Fame in 1999 and was inducted into the National Distance Running Hall of Fame in 2002. She won the first three official women's races at the International Cross Country Championships from 1967 to 1969. She won the American 1970 International race again in 1971.

== Achievements ==
- 1968 Olympics: 800 m (5th)
- World Record: 3,000 m – 9:26.90 July 7, 1971
- World Record: 2 mi. – 10:07.0 July 7, 1971
- 1971 Pan American Games: 800 m (2nd)
- Five national cross country titles
- Five world championships
- Named "Washington's Woman of the Year" by the Washington State Legislature in 1976
- Inducted into the National Track and Field Hall of Fame in 1990
- Second female named to the United States Track Coaches Hall of Fame in 1999
- Inducted into the National Distance Hall of Fame in 2002
- Documentary film "Run Like A Girl" looks at three generations of women runners, featuring Doris Brown Heritage. 2005 By Charlotte Lettis Richardson
- Documentary film "Last Lap" (Kinetic Village, 2024) tells her story as a runner and coach
