= Dick Taylor (runner) =

British long-distance runner (born 1945)

Personal information
- Nationality: British (English)
- Born: 3 January 1945 (age 81) Coventry, England
- Height: 180 cm (5 ft 11 in)
- Weight: 62 kg (137 lb)

Sport
- Sport: Athletics
- Event: middle/long distance
- Club: Coventry Godiva Harriers
Medal record
Athletics
Representing England
British Empire & Commonwealth Games
| Bronze medal – third place | 1970 Edinburgh | 10,000 metres |

Richard George Taylor (born 3 January 1945) is a British former long-distance runner who competed at the 1968 Summer Olympics.

== Biography ==
Taylor finished third behind Ron Clarke in the 3 miles event at the 1966 AAA Championships. Shortly afterwards he represented England in the 3 miles event, at the 1966 British Empire and Commonwealth Games in Kingston, Jamaica.

He was a team gold medallist at the 1967 International Cross Country Championships and was prominent at the 1969 International Cross Country Championships, taking the silver medal behind Gaston Roelants to lead the English men to the team title.

Taylor became the British 10,000 metres champion after winning the British AAA Championships title at the 1969 AAA Championships.

He represented England in the 10,000 metres and won a bronze medal at the 1970 Commonwealth Games in Edinburgh and won team gold at the 1970 International Cross Country Championships.
