= Sidi Aïch (Tunisia) =

Sidi Aïch سيدي عيش
- Location in Tunisia
- Coordinates: 35°13′47″N 9°7′46″E
- Country: Tunisia
- Governorate: Gafsa Governorate

Population (2004)
  - Total: 8,297
  - Ethnicities: Arab
  - Religions: Islam
- Time zone: UTC1 (CET)
- Postal code: 1250

Sidi Aïch (Arabic: سيدي عيش) is a small town, located at 35° 13′ 47″ N, 9° 07′ 46″ E in south-central Tunisia, it belongs to Gafsa Governorate and it is located in 29 km in the north of Gafsa.

This city was the birthplace of Mohammed Gammoudi, athlete and first Olympic champion from Tunisia.

Ruins near the town have been tentatively identified with Gemellae, a Roman era civitas in the Roman Province of Byzacena.
