= Mohammed Gammoudi =

Tunisian athlete

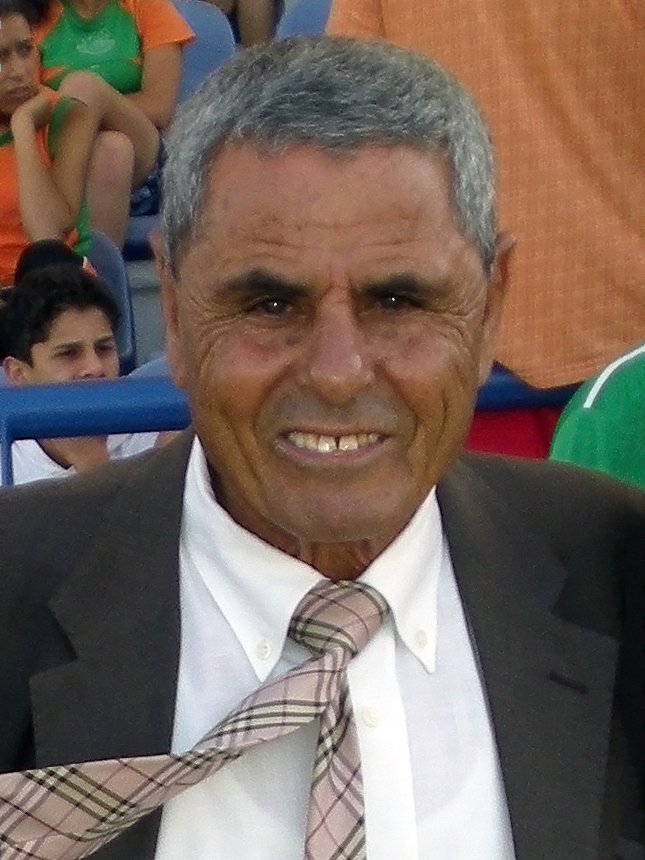
- Gammoudi in 2009

Personal information
- Native name: محمد التليلي بن عبدالله
- Nationality: Tunisian
- Born: Mohammed Tlili ben Abdallah; February 11, 1938 (age 88) Sidi Aïch, Tunisia
- Height: 172 cm (5 ft 8 in)
- Weight: 60 kg (132 lb)

Sport
- Sport: Athletics
- Club: AS Militaire Tunis

Achievements and titles
- Personal bests: 800 meters: 1:51.2; 1500 meters: 3:41.9; 3000 meters: 7:50.2; 5000 meters: 13:27.33; 10,000 meters: 27:54.59
Medal record
Representing Tunisia
Olympic Games
Gold medal – first place	1968 Mexico City	5000 metres
Silver medal – second place	1964 Tokyo	10000 metres
Silver medal – second place	1972 Munich	5000 metres
Bronze medal – third place	1968 Mexico City	10000 metres
Mediterranean Games
Gold medal – first place	1963 Naples	5000 metres
Gold medal – first place	1963 Naples	10000 metres
Gold medal – first place	1967 Tunis	5000 metres
Gold medal – first place	1967 Tunis	10000 metres

Mohammed Tlili ben Abdallah (Arabic: محمد التليلي بن عبدالله), also known as Moham(m)ed Gammoudi, (born February 11, 1938) is a Tunisian athlete who competed as a long-distance runner in international track and field competitions. He represented Tunisia in the Tokyo, Mexico City, and Munich Olympiads and recorded four medals, including a gold medal in the 5000 metres event in Mexico City. Gammoudi was also competitive at 10,000 metres.

Born in Sidi Aïch, in Tunisia, Mohammed Gammoudi was one of the pioneers of the African long-distance running revolution that changed the face of the sport in the final decades of the 20th century.

== Running career ==
=== 1963 Mediterranean Games and 1964 Olympics ===
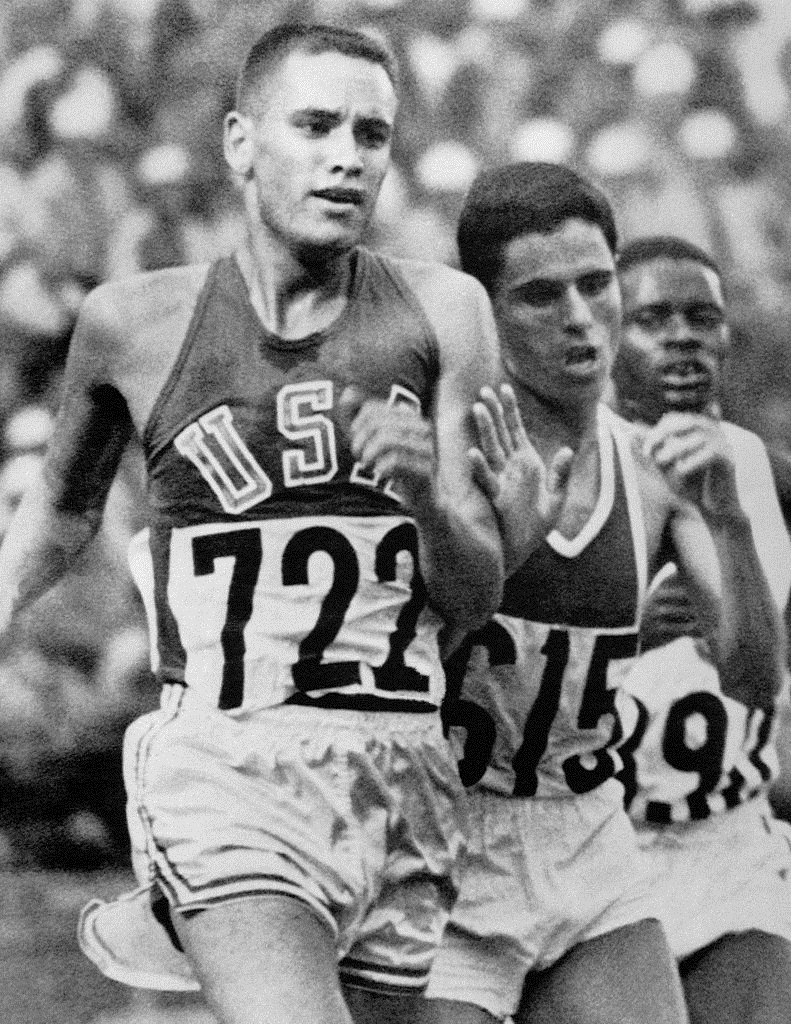
Mills and Gammoudi (right) at the 1964 Olympics.

Gammoudi first came to international attention at the 1963 Mediterranean Games in Naples, where he won the 5,000 m and 10,000 m. and repeated the feat in the 1967 Games. Despite those achievements, Gammoudi was still virtually unknown when he arrived at the Tokyo Olympic Games. The favourite, world record holder Ron Clarke from Australia, ensured a fast tempo throughout the race. With one lap remaining, Clarke had dropped all his main rivals, except Gammoudi and Billy Mills from United States. Coming into the home straight, Mills, Clark and Gammoudi exchanged leads. With 50 m to go, Gammoudi had the lead, until Mills swept past Gammoudi to win the gold medal. Two days later, Gammoudi won his heat in the 5000 m, but for reasons never fully explained, he withdrew from the final.

Gammoudi won the British AAA Championships title in the 6 miles event at the 1965 AAA Championships and 1967 AAA Championships.

=== 1967 Mediterranean Games and 1968 Olympics ===
Gammoudi successfully defended his 5000 m and 10 000 m titles at the Mediterranean Games in Tunis in 1967, and was one of the favourites at the Mexico Olympics. In the 10,000 m final in Mexico, Gammoudi was in the leading group throughout the race. The group had been reduced to three by the bell lap. Naftali Temu from Kenya, who won in 29:27.4 and Mamo Wolde from Ethiopia 29:28, sprinted the last lap, outrunning Gammoudi, leaving him at 29:34, with the bronze medal. Two days later, Gammoudi qualified for the 5000 m final. In the final, three runners were in contention at the bell lap, with Gammoudi leading Temu and another Kenyan, Kip Keino. The last lap was fast pace, and although the two Kenyans gave charge, Gammoudi held on to the lead, winning the gold medal.

=== 1971 Mediterranean Games and 1972 Olympics ===
At the next Mediterranean Games, at İzmir in 1971, Gammoudi's won the silver in the 5000 m. Despite his disappointing performance at İzmir, Gammoudi was one of the favourites in the impressive 5,000 m and 10,000 m fields at the Munich Olympics. In the 10 000 m final, a tightly bunched group of nine runners were traveling at sub-world record pace just before the 4600 m mark, when Lasse Virén from Finland suddenly stumbled and fell over, causing Gammoudi to tumble over the top of him. Virén recovered quickly and went on to win the race, but Gammoudi took much longer getting to his feet, and after running for a lap and a half to close the 100 m gap that had opened between himself and the leaders, he dropped out. In contrast to the 10,000 m pace, the early stages of the 5000 m final were run at a very slow pace, with Gammoudi prominent in the pack that remained tightly bunched for the first 3000 m. The pace picked up considerably in the last 2000 m, with Virén and United States champion Steve Prefontaine separating from the pack. The last mile turned into an all out sprint, with Virén beating Gammoudi by about ten meters, in the latter's last major competitive race.

=== International Cross Country Championships ===
Gammoudi also excelled in cross country running. He finished third at the 1965 International Cross Country Championships, held at Ostend, Belgium. In 1968, running in Tunis, in his home country, he won the International Cross Country Championships, becoming the third African man to take that title.

== International competitions ==
Year	Competition	Venue	Position	Event	Notes
Representing Tunisia
1962	International Cross Country Championships	Sheffield, United Kingdom	48th	12.0 km	46:52
1963	International Cross Country Championships	San Sebastián, Spain	7th	12.1 km	38:11.6
1963	Mediterranean Games	Naples, Italy	1st	5000 m	14:07.4
1963	Mediterranean Games	Naples, Italy	1st	10,000 m	29:34.2
1964	Olympic Games	Tokyo, Japan	20th (h)	5000 m	14:10.2 (Note: Did not start in the final)
1964	Olympic Games	Tokyo, Japan	2nd	10,000 m	28:24.8
1965	International Cross Country Championships	Ostend, Belgium	3rd	12.1 km	37:00
1967	Mediterranean Games	Tunis, Tunisia	1st	5000 m	14:02.2
1967	Mediterranean Games	Tunis, Tunisia	1st	10,000 m	31:01.6
1968	International Cross Country Championships	Tunis, Tunisia	1st	12.1 km	35:25.4
1968	Olympic Games	Mexico City, Mexico	1st	5000 m	14:05.0
1968	Olympic Games	Mexico City, Mexico	3rd	10,000 m	29:34.2
1969	International Cross Country Championships	Clydebank, United Kingdom	–	12 km	DNF
1969	Maghreb Championships	Tripoli, Libya	1st	5000 m	14:01.6
1969	Maghreb Championships	Tripoli, Libya	1st	10,000 m	29:46.8
1971	Maghreb Championships	Casablanca, Morocco	1st	5000 m	14:20.2
1971	Maghreb Championships	Casablanca, Morocco	1st	10,000 m	30:16.8
1971	Mediterranean Games	İzmir, Turkey	2nd	5000 m	13:40.8
1971	Mediterranean Games	İzmir, Turkey	–	10,000 m	DNF
1972	Olympic Games	Munich, West Germany	2nd	5000 m	13:27.4
1972	Olympic Games	Munich, West Germany	3rd (h)	10,000 m	27:54.69 (Note: Did not finish in the final)
