= John Allen (athlete) =

American racewalker

Personal information
- Full name: John William Allen
- Born: January 15, 1926 Buffalo, New York, United States
- Died: September 16, 2006 (aged 80) San Bernardino, California, California

Sport
- Sport: Athletics
- Event: Racewalking

John William Allen (January 15, 1926 – September 16, 2006) was an American racewalker. He competed in the men's 50 kilometres walk at the 1960 Summer Olympics.

Allen also served in the United States Navy during World War II as a radio operator on a ship in the Pacific.
