= Masters M35 5000 metres world record progression =

This is the progression of world record improvements of the 5000 metres M35 division of Masters athletics.

Key

Incomplete information Pending

| Hand | Auto | Athlete | Nationality | Birthdate | Location | Date |
|---|---|---|---|---|---|---|
| | 12:53.60 | Bernard Lagat | United States | 12.12.1974 | Monaco | 22.07.2011 |
| | 13:01.32 | John Kibowen | Kenya | 21.04.1969 | Rome | 02.07.2004 |
| | 13:07.40 | Dieter Baumann | Germany | 09.02.1965 | Zürich | 16.08.2002 |
| | 13:13.20 | Mohamed Ezzher | France | 26.04.1960 | Villeneuve d'Ascq | 17.06.1995 |
| | 13:16.34 | Miruts Yifter | Ethiopia | 15.05.1944 | Bratislava | 07.06.1980 |
| | 13:30.27 | Nikolay Sviridov | Soviet Union | 06.07.1938 | Helsinki | 16.09.1973 |
| 13:38.6 | | Lucien Rault | France | 30.03.1936 | Bourges | 24.06.1972 |
| 13:38.8 | | Mamo Wolde | Ethiopia | 12.06.1932 | Turku | 02.07.1967 |
