= Patrick Journoud =

French discus thrower

Personal information
- Nationality: French
- Born: 27 April 1964 Casablanca, Morocco
- Died: 16 January 2015 (aged 50)

Sport
- Event: Discus

Patrick Journoud (27 April 1964 – 16 January 2015) was a French discus thrower. He competed in the discus at the 1988 Summer Olympics.

== Biography ==
A bronze medalist at the 1983 European Junior Championships, he twice improved the French record in the discus throw, raising it to 62.36m in 1987 and 63.02 m in 1988. He is the current holder of the French junior record with 56.26m.
