= Ron Hill =

British long-distance runner (1938–2021)

Ron Hill MBE
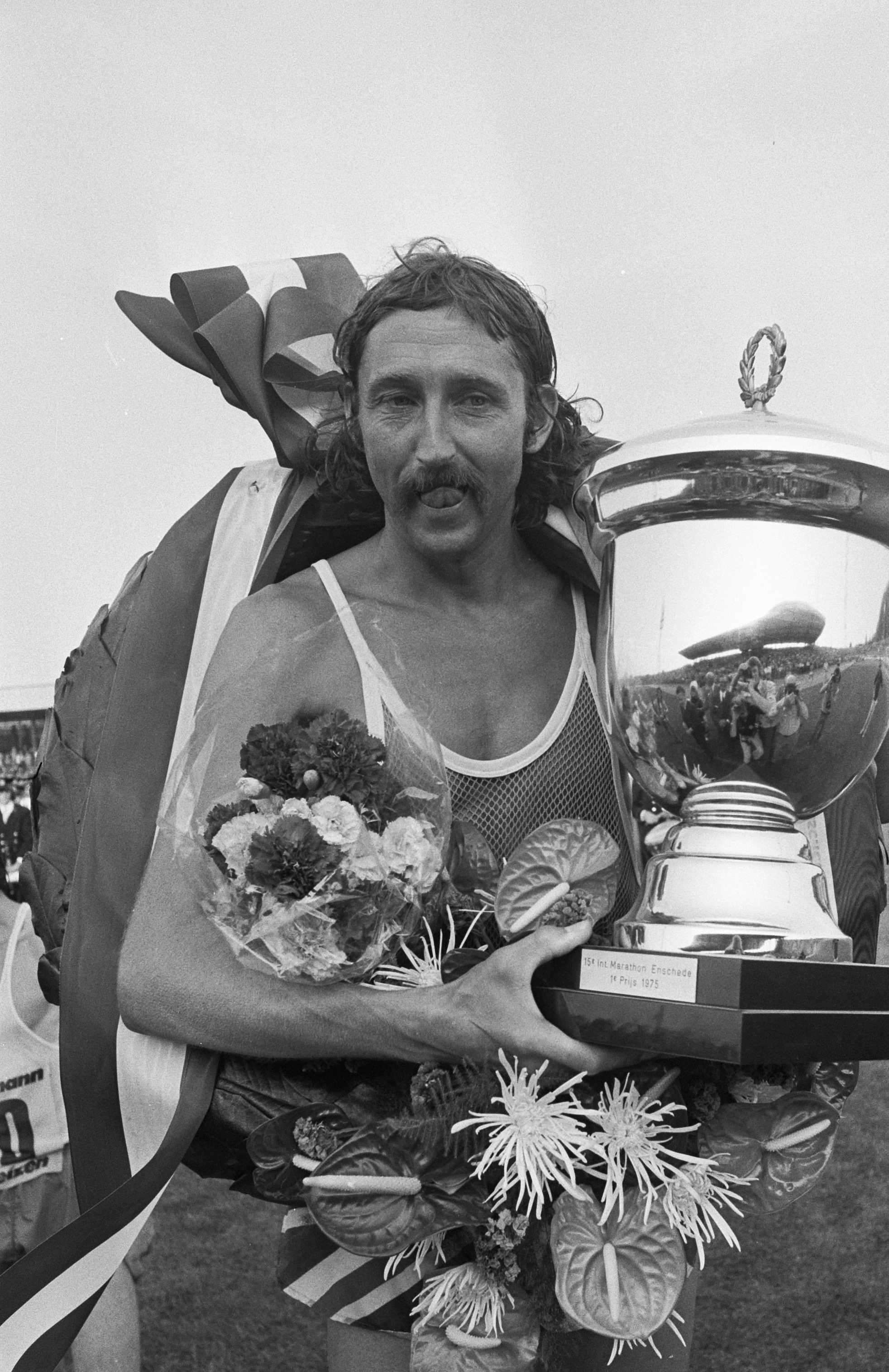
- Hill at the Enschede Marathon in 1975

Personal information
- Born: 25 September 1938 Accrington, Lancashire, England
- Died: 23 May 2021 (aged 82) Hyde, Greater Manchester, England
- Height: 1.67 m (5 ft 6 in)
- Weight: 61 kg (134 lb)

Sport
- Sport: Long-distance running
- Club: Clayton-Le-Moors Harriers, Lancashire; Bolton United Harriers

Achievements and titles
- Olympic finals: 1964, 1968, 1972
Medal record
Men's athletics
Representing Great Britain
European Championships
Gold medal – first place	1969 Athens	Marathon
Bronze medal – third place	1971 Helsinki	Marathon
Summer Universiade
Bronze medal – third place	1963 Porto Alegre	5000m
Representing England
Commonwealth Games
Gold medal – first place	1970 Edinburgh	Marathon

Ronald Hill MBE (25 September 1938 – 23 May 2021) was a British runner and clothing entrepreneur. He was the second man to break 2:10 in the marathon; he set world records at four other distances, and laid claim to the marathon world record. (Note: In an interview with Amby Burfoot of Runner's World, Hill commented: "I won the Commonwealth Championships in Edinburgh in 2:09:28, which I claim was a world record because the attempts to remeasure Derek Clayton's course in Antwerp [Clayton ran 2:08:34 at Antwerp in 1969] were never successfully carried out." Some road racing authorities, including the Association of Road Racing Statisticians, consider Clayton's performance to have occurred on a short course and recognise Hill in the progression for world best in the marathon.) He ran two Olympic Marathons (Tokyo 1964 and Munich 1972), and achieved a personal marathon record of 2:09:28. In 1970, Hill won the 74th Boston Marathon in a course record 2:10:30. He also won gold medals for the marathon at the European Championships in 1969 and the Commonwealth Games in 1970. Hill laid claim to the longest streak of consecutive days running – every day for 52 years and 39 days from 1964 to 2017.

== Early life ==
Hill was educated at Accrington Grammar School.

== Running career ==
Hill held world records for 10 miles (16 km) (47:02, Leicester, April 1968; 46:44, Leicester, November 1968); 15 miles (24 km) (72:48.2, Bolton, July 1965); and 25 kilometers (15.5 miles) (75:22.6, Bolton, July 1965).

In 1963, Hill won the 6-mile (9.7 km) event at the British Amateur Athletic Association (AAA) championships in a time of 27:49.8, equalling the UK record. In the following year's AAA six mile (10 km) race, Hill was outsprinted by Mike Bullivant, who won by less than half a second; both runners, however, finished more than twenty seconds under the UK record. At the 1964 Olympic Games in Tokyo, Hill placed 18th in the 10,000 metres, in a time of 29:53.0, and 19th in the marathon, in 2:25:34.4.

In 1964, Hill set his first world record, clocking 1:15:22.6 for 25 kilometres (15.5 mi) eclipsing Emil Zátopek's previous mark by more than 1 minute; he also set another world record of 1:12:48.2 for 15 miles (24 km) along the way.

Hill was the first winner of the Freckleton Half Marathon in 1964 and still holds the course record of 1 hour 4 minutes 45 seconds.

In 1966, Hill competed in the European Championships Marathon, finishing twelfth.

On 6 April 1968, in the British AAA 10-mile (16 km) championship at Leicester, Hill set a new world record of 47:02.2; he won the AAA 10-mile (16 km) every year between 1965 and 1969. Later in 1968, he again lowered the world 10-mile (16 km) world record, to 46:44.0. In the 1968 Summer Olympic Games in Mexico City, he placed seventh in the 10000 m.

In 1969, Hill won the European Championships Marathon on the Marathon-to-Athens course.

In 1970, Hill became the first British runner to win the Boston Marathon, by a wide margin, shattering the course record by three minutes with a time of 2:10:30. In July, at the British Commonwealth Games in Edinburgh, he became the second man ever after Derek Clayton to break the 2:10 barrier, clocking a world record time of 2:09:28. Hill was timed in 29:24 for the first 10 kilometres (6.2 mi) in Edinburgh, the equivalent of a 2:04 marathon pace, described as "suicidal". He arrived at the Fukuoka Marathon as a clear favourite, but placed only ninth in 2:15:27.

Hill was ranked as the top marathoner of the year for 1970 by Track & Field News, on the strength of his two important wins – the Boston and British Commonwealth Games marathons. The next year, in the 1972 New Year Honours, Hill was appointed Member of the Order of the British Empire (MBE) for services to athletics. His final Olympic games was at the 1972 Munich Olympics, where he finished sixth in the marathon at the age of 33.

Hill was the winner of the first China Coast Marathon (CCM), held in Hong Kong in 1981, with the result of 2:34:35. He described it as "the toughest marathon he'd run".

=== Consecutive days streak ===
Hill did not miss a day of running between 20 December 1964 and 30 January 2017 – a total of 52 years and 39 days. Hill defined a "run" as completing a distance of at least one mile at any pace. His streak included workouts after a car crash in 1993 when Hill broke his sternum, and after bunion surgery, after which he used a crutch to cover one mile (1.6 km) in 27 minutes the next day. In December 2013, his streak entered its 50th year; his total logged lifetime mileage was at 158,628. At the end of April 2014 it stood at 159,106.5. On 20 December 2014, Hill completed Manchester's 5 km Heaton Park parkrun, achieving his goal of running at least a mile a day for 50 years.

On 30 January 2017 his Facebook page announced that "Due to ill health Ron has decided to take a day off", thus ending his streak. Ending his streak at 52 years and 39 days, Hill had pains in his chest while running and made the decision to not run the next day to address the issue. "After 400m my heart started to hurt and by the time I got to the one mile (1.6 km) point I thought I was going to die," he said. "I was in such pain and I thought 'no, hang on, this isn't going anywhere at the moment', and really in respect of my wife, two sons and friends I need to stop this."

== Achievements ==
- All results regarding marathon, unless stated otherwise

Year	Competition	Venue	Position	Notes
Representing Great Britain
1970	Boston Marathon	Boston, United States	1st	2:10:30
1970	Commonwealth Games	Edinburgh, Scotland	1st	2:09:28 PR
1973	Enschede Marathon	Enschede, Netherlands	1st	2:18:06
1975	Enschede Marathon	Enschede, Netherlands	1st	2:15:59

== Later life ==
After graduating from the University of Manchester with a PhD in textile chemistry, Hill was convinced of the benefits of synthetic materials for runners. In 1970 he started a company named Ron Hill Sports, which pioneered various products including wrap-over shorts, mesh vests, waterproof running jackets, and reflective strips. Hill related that he founded the company "because I was running to and from work in the dark in winter and wondered what I needed to stay safe." Company sales at one point exceeded £6 million, but Hill sold out due to financial difficulties in the early 1990s. He later started Hilly Clothing specialising in technical socks and other apparel.

Hill achieved his goal of racing in 100 countries before his 70th birthday with races in Panama and the Faroe Islands. His final marathon was the 100th Boston Marathon, in 1996. He completed 115 marathons, 112 under 2:50, 103 under 2:45, and 29 under 2:20. Hill recorded 21 marathon victories in his career, placing second 13 times, and third 8 times.

Hill was president of the Road Runners Club from 1987 to 1988.

Hill died on 23 May 2021, at the age of 82. His son Steven said the cause of death was urosepsis.

== Publications ==
- The Long Hard Road: An Autobiography. 1981. Ron Hill Sports. ISBN 0-9507882-0-1

== See also ==
- Bill Smith (fell runner)

== Notes ==
Sporting positions
Preceded by Derek Graham	Men's Half Marathon Best Year Performance; 1971	Succeeded by Víctor Mora
