= Jean-Louis Lebon =

French shot putter

Jean-Louis Lebon (born 13 June 1967) is a retired French shot putter.

He was born in Saint-Denis, Réunion. He competed at the 1996 and 1998 European Indoor Championships, but without reaching the final. He became French champion in 1994, 1995, 1996 and 1997, and French indoor champion in 1995, 1996, 1997 and 1998.

His personal best throws was 18.63 metres (indoor) achieved in 1995 and 18.57 metres achieved in 1998.
