= Manfred Steffny =

German long-distance runner (born 1941)

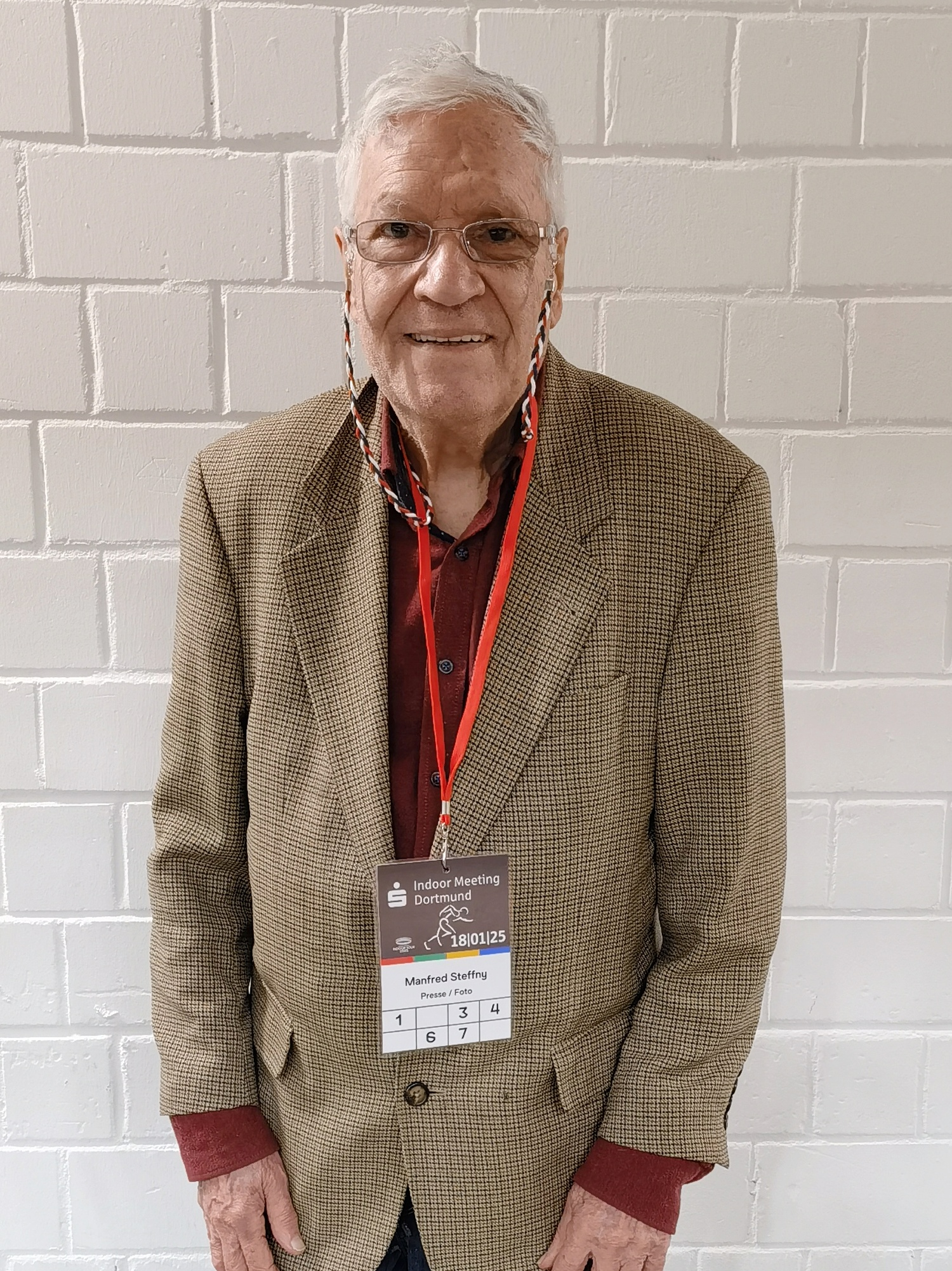
- Steffny at Indoor Meeting in Dortmund

Personal information
- Nationality: German
- Born: 14 August 1941 (age 84) Trier, Germany

Sport
- Sport: Long-distance running
- Event: Marathon

Manfred Steffny (born 14 August 1941) is a German long-distance runner. He competed in the marathon at the 1968 Summer Olympics and the 1972 Summer Olympics representing West Germany.
