= Jacques Arnoux =

French racewalker (1938–2019)

Personal information
- Nationality: French
- Born: 7 April 1938
- Died: 8 August 2019 (aged 81)

Sport
- Sport: Athletics
- Event: Racewalking

Jacques Arnoux (7 April 1938 – 8 August 2019) was a French racewalker. He competed in the men's 50 kilometres walk at the 1960 Summer Olympics.
