= Maurice Lurot =

French middle-distance runner

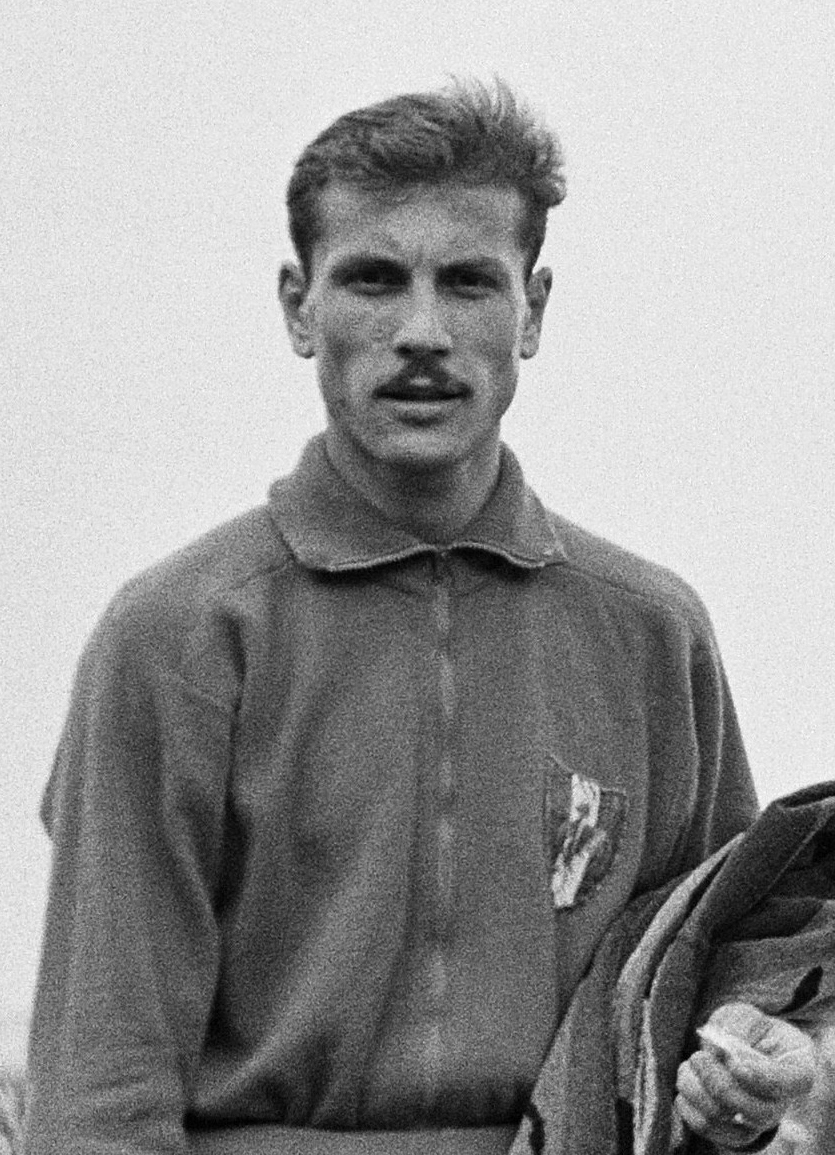
- Maurice Lurot in 1963

Personal information
- Born: 13 April 1940 (age 86) Charleville-Mézières, France
- Height: 1.75 m (5 ft 9 in)
- Weight: 68 kg (150 lb)

Sport
- Sport: athletics
- Club: USM Saint-Ouen

Maurice Lurot (born 13 April 1940) is a retired French middle-distance runner. He competed in the 800 m event at the 1964 Summer Olympics, but failed to reach the final. His personal best in the 800 m is 1:47.2 (1966). His wife Michèle also competed in sprint events at the 1964 Games.

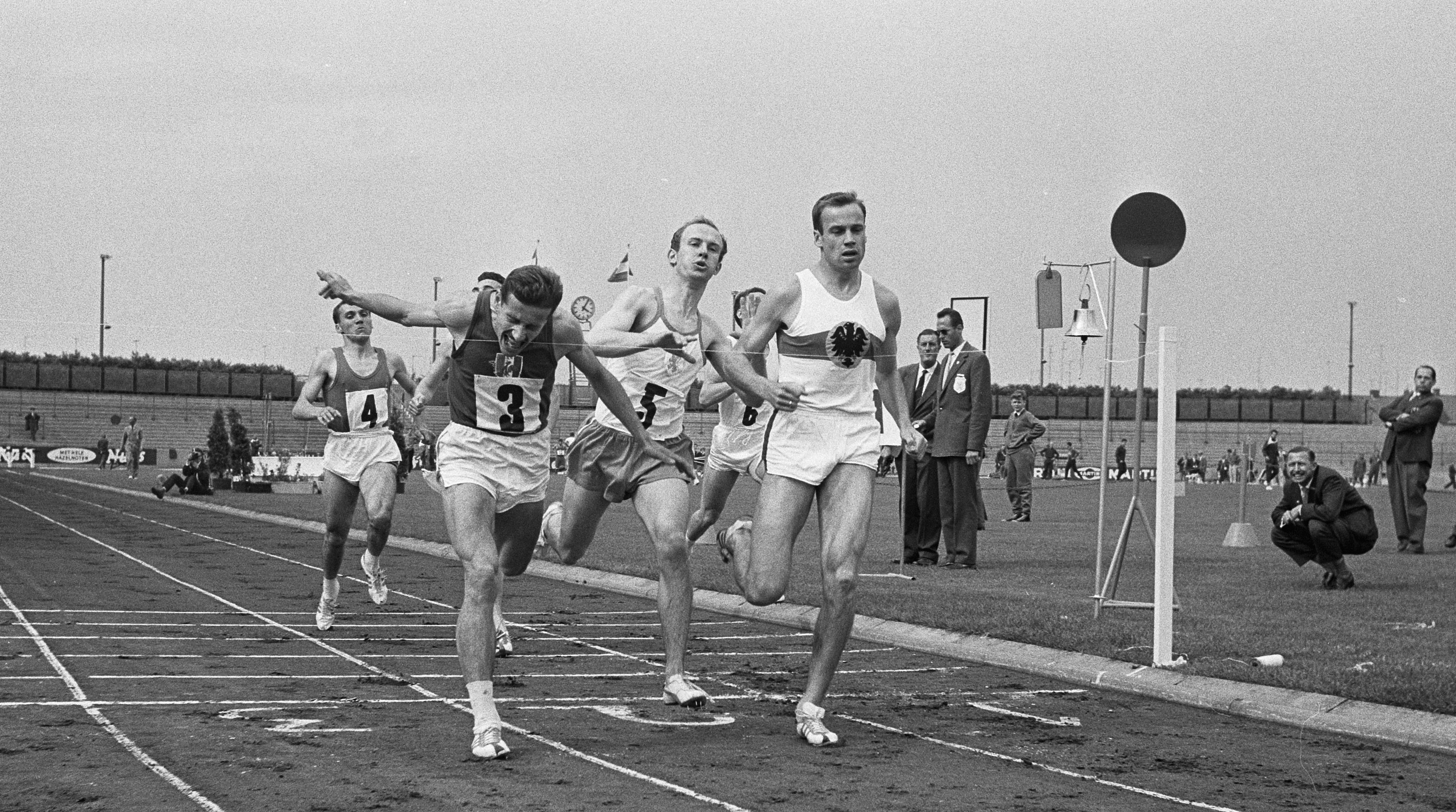
Finish 800 m in Enschede, the Netherlands, in 1963: Maurice Lurot, Jan van Uden and Manfred Kinder
