= Pierre Alard =

French discus thrower (1937–2019)

Personal information
- Nationality: French
- Born: 17 September 1937 Bordeaux, France
- Died: 13 January 2019 (aged 81) Luçon, France

Sport
- Sport: Athletics
- Event: Discus throw

Pierre Alard (17 September 1937 – 13 January 2019) was a French athlete. He competed in the men's discus throw at the 1956 Summer Olympics and the 1960 Summer Olympics.
