= Charlemagne Anyamah =

French athlete (born 1938)

Charlemagne Anyamah (born 28 January 1938) is a French athlete who specialises in the men's decathlon. Anyamah competed at the 1968 Summer Olympics. He was born in Le Lamentin, Martinique.
