= Masters M35 10000 metres world record progression =

This is the progression of world record improvements of the 10000 metres M35 division of Masters athletics.

Key

Incomplete information Pending

Hand	Auto	Athlete	Nationality	Birthdate	Age	Location	Date	Ref
	26:51.20	Haile Gebrselassie	Ethiopia	18 April 1973	35 years, 36 days	Hengelo	24 May 2008	
	27:17.48	Carlos Lopes	Portugal	18 February 1947	37 years, 135 days	Stockholm	2 July 1984	
	27:42.69	Miruts Yifter	Ethiopia	15.05.1944	Moscow	27.07.1980		
27:58.6 h		Nikolay Sviridov	Soviet Union	06.07.1938	Moscow	10.07.1973		
28:03.8 h		Gaston Roelants	Belgium	05.02.1937	Brussels	05.08.1972		
28:20.4 h		Lucien Rault	France	30.03.1936	Paris	23.07.1971		
