= Stéphane Vial =

French shot putter

Stéphane Vial (born 9 February 1973) is a retired French shot putter.

He won the gold medal at the 1997 Jeux de la Francophonie, and competed at the 1998 European Championships and the 2000 European Indoor Championships without reaching the final. He became French champion in 1998 and 1999, and French indoor champion in 2000.

His personal best throw was 18.99 metres, achieved in July 2000 in Saint-Etienne.
