= Henri Delerue =

French racewalker

Personal information
- Nationality: French
- Born: 14 November 1939
- Died: 9 January 2016 (aged 76)

Sport
- Sport: Athletics
- Event: Racewalking

Henri Delerue (14 November 1939 – 9 January 2016) is a French racewalker. He competed at the 1960, 1964 and the 1968 Summer Olympics.
