= Vladimir Prikhodko =

French hammer thrower

Personal information
- Nationality: French
- Born: 1 March 1944 Paris, France
- Died: 27 November 2011 (aged 67)

Sport
- Sport: Athletics
- Event: Hammer throw

Vladimir Prikhodko (1 March 1944 – 27 November 2011) was a French athlete.

== Professional career ==
He competed in the men's hammer throw at the 1972 Summer Olympics.
