= Nicolas Guigon =

French pole vaulter (born 1980)

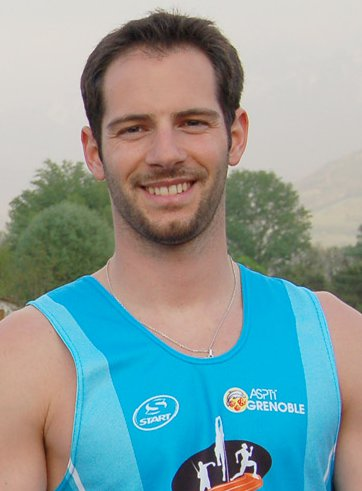
- Guigon in 2017

Personal information
- Full name: Nicolas Guigon
- Nationality: France
- Born: 10 October 1980 (age 45) Échirolles, France
- Height: 1.81 m (5 ft 11 1/2 in)
- Weight: 68 kg (150 lb)

Sport
- Sport: Athletics
- Event: Pole vault
- Club: ASPTT Grenoble
- Coached by: Philippe d'Encausse

Achievements and titles
- Personal best: Pole vault: 5.75 (2004)

Nicolas Guigon (born 10 October 1980 in Échirolles) is a French pole vaulter. Representing his nation France in the men's pole vault at the 2004 Summer Olympics, Guigon cleared a height at 5.75 metres to set his own personal best from the national athletics meet in Reims. Throughout his sporting career, Guigon trained for the track and field club ASPTT Grenoble, under his personal coach, 1991 Mediterranean Games champion, and two-time Olympian Philippe d'Encausse (1988 and 1992).

Guigon qualified for the French squad in the men's pole vault at the 2004 Summer Olympics in Athens. Two months before the Games, he registered a personal best clearance and an Olympic A-standard of 5.75 m to secure a spot on the French team at the national athletics meet in Reims. During the prelims, Guigon started off with a single foul, until he successfully surpassed 5.30 m on the second attempt. Failing to clear his next targeted height of 5.50 m after three straight misses, Guigon shared a thirty-first spot with Poland's Adam Kolasa throughout the overall standings, and did not advance past the qualifying round.
