= Rachid Chékhémani =

French long-distance runner

Rachid Chékhémani (born 1 October 1973 in Barentin) is a French long-distance runner.

He finished sixteenth in the 5000 metres at the 2002 European Athletics Championships. He competed at the World Cross Country Championships in 2002, 2003 and 2005.

== Personal bests ==
- 1500 metres - 3:35.22 min (1999)
- 3000 metres - 7:38.57 min (2001)
- 5000 metres - 13:20.14 min (2001)
