= Fernand Kolbeck =

French long-distance runner

Personal information
- Nationality: French
- Born: 11 October 1944 (age 81) Erstein, France

Sport
- Sport: Long-distance running
- Event: Marathon

Fernand Kolbeck (born 11 October 1944) is a French long-distance runner. He competed in the marathon at the 1972 Summer Olympics and the 1976 Summer Olympics.
