= Pamela Davies =

British paediatrician (1924–2009)

Pamela Davies FRCP
- Born: Pamela Anne Davies; May 2, 1924
- Died: May 5, 2009 (aged 85)

Pamela Anne Davies (2 May 1924 - 5 May 2009) was a British consultant paediatrician, who specialised in neonatal follow up and infection.

After a period as a junior hospital doctor and then Lecturer in the United Oxford Hospitals, and was appointed Consultant Paediatrician at the Hammersmith Hospital from 1966 to 1982.

In 1964, she and Dr. Victoria Smallpeice collaborated on the introduction of very early enteral feeding with human milk in preterm infants.

She was a Fellow of the Royal College of Physicians (FRCP) and an Honorary Fellow of the Royal College of Paediatrics and Child Health (HonFRCPCH)
