= Guy Texereau =

French long-distance runner

Personal information
- Nationality: French
- Born: 14 May 1935 Melle, Deux-Sèvres, France
- Died: 28 April 2001 (aged 65) Saint-Astier, France

Sport
- Sport: Long-distance running
- Event: Marathon

Guy Texereau (14 May 1935 – 28 April 2001) was a French long-distance runner. He competed in the marathon at the 1968 Summer Olympics.
