= René Jourdan =

French long-distance runner

Personal information
- Born: 12 May 1943 Arblade-le-Bas, Gers, France
- Died: 7 June 2025 (aged 82) Saint-Pierre-du-Mont, Landes, France

Sport
- Sport: Track and field
- Event(s): 5000 metres 10,000 metres
Medal record
Men's athletics
Representing France
World Championships
Bronze medal – third place	1974 Monza	Senior men's team

René Jourdan (12 May 1943 – 7 June 2025) was a French long-distance runner.

== Life and career ==
Jourdan was born in Arblade-le-Bas, Gers. He was a physical education instructor in Aire-sur-l'Adour.

Jourdan competed in two events at the 1969 European Athletics Championships, placing tenth in the 5000 metres, and then placing seventh place in the 10,000 metres. He also competed at the 1974 IAAF World Cross Country Championships, winning the bronze medal in the senior men's team event. He became French champion in the 5000 metres in 1967, 1969 and 1970, and 10,000 metres champion in 1968.

== Death ==
Jourdan died in Saint-Pierre-du-Mont, Landes on 7 June 2025, at the age of 82.
