= Abdelkader Zaddem =

Tunisian long-distance runner

Abdelkader Zaddem (born 29 November 1944) is a retired Tunisian long-distance runner who specialized in the 10,000 metres.

He finished eighth at the 1972 Olympic Games. When he won the gold medal at the 1975 Mediterranean Games, he also set a championship record of 28:27.0 minutes which stood until 1991. He also won two gold medals at the 1973 Maghreb Championships and one at the 1975 Maghreb Championships. He competed many times at the World Cross Country Championships, with a nineteenth place from 1974 and a twelfth place from 1975 as his best results.

His personal best 10,000 metres time was 28.14.8 minutes, achieved at the 1972 Olympics. He also had 13.31.2 minutes in the 5000 metres, achieved in June 1976 in Saint-Maur-des-Fossés.
