= Michel Bernard (runner) =

French runner (1931–2019)

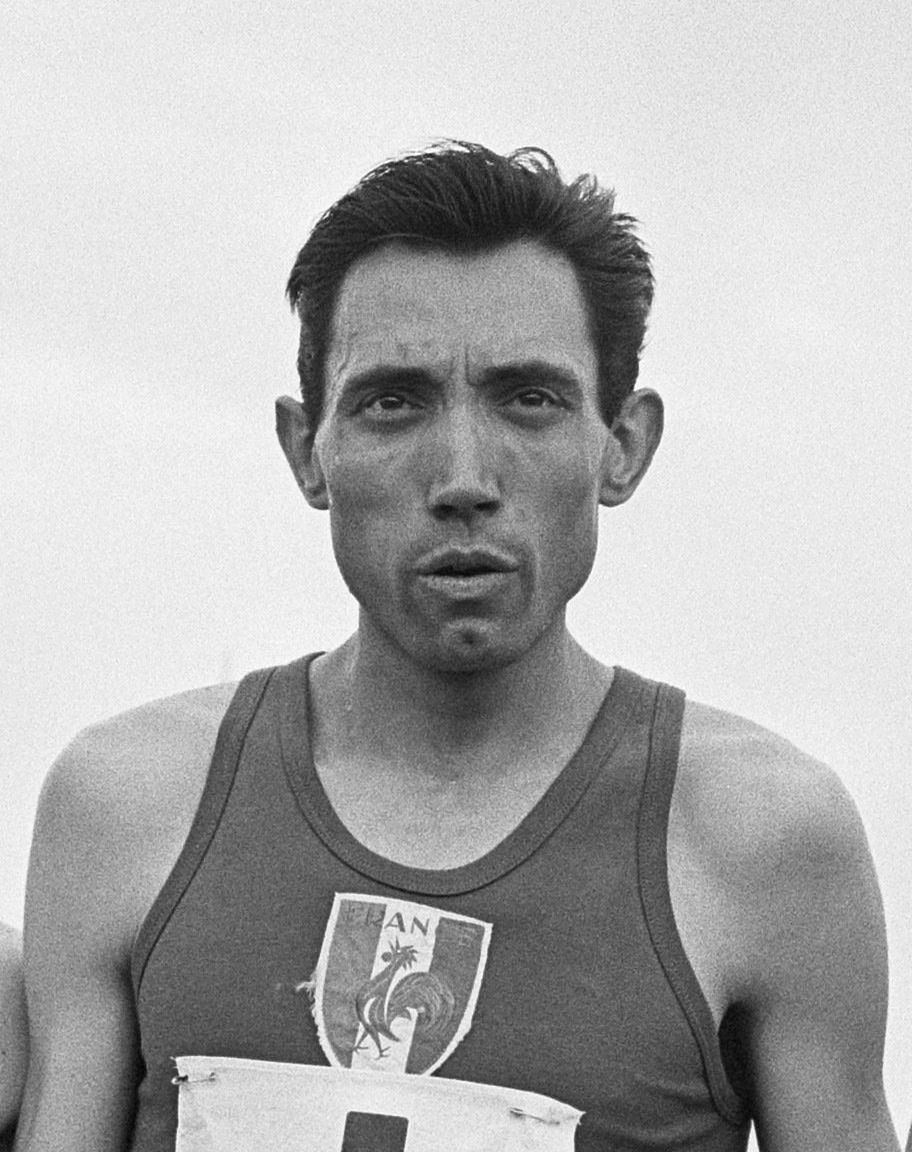
- Michel Bernard in 1963

Personal information
- Born: 31 December 1931 Sepmeries, France
- Died: 14 February 2019 (aged 87)
- Height: 1.81 m (5 ft 11 in)
- Weight: 68 kg (150 lb)

Sport
- Sport: Middle- and long-distance running
- Club: AS Anzin

Michel Bernard (31 December 1931 – 14 February 2019) was a French middle- and long-distance runner. He competed at the 1960 and 1964 Olympics in the 1500 m and 5000 m and finished in seventh place in all events. During his career he won nine national titles, in the 1500 m (1955 and 1959), 5000 m (1958–1960 and 1962) and 10000 m (1961, 1964 and 1965). Between 1985 and 1987 he was president of the Fédération française d'athlétisme.

== Biography ==
Bernard was born to Pierre Bernard, a blacksmith; his mother ran a hardware shop. His father died on the front in World War II, and his mother raised him alone, together with his younger sister.

At sixteen, Bernard started working at a factory. Next year he became involved with running, and in 1949 and 1950 became junior champion of France. He lost his form during 18 months of the military service, but had recovered it by 1954. In 1955, he won his first senior national title and was selected for the national team, but not for the 1956 Olympics. Nationally, Bernard was losing to Michel Jazy, who was a stronger runner and had better conditions for training, whereas Bernard had to take unpaid leaves from work to prepare for major competitions.

Bernard won the British AAA Championships title in the 1 mile event at the 1961 AAA Championships.

In 1960, Bernard met Chantal Churn, also a track athlete. They married on 27 November 1961 and later had a son, Pierre-Michel (born in 1963), and daughters Sandrine (born 1964) and Cathy (born 1965).

After retiring from competitions Bernard became involved with the national athletics federation, serving as its president between 1985 and 1987. He also became interested in local politics, and founded in 2001 the association Anzin pour tous.

== Personal bests ==
- 1500 m – 3:38.7 (1963)
- 5000 m – 13:40.0 (1971)

== Bibliography ==
- Bernard, Michel (1975). La rage de courir: 25 années de course à pied. Calmann-Lévy. ISBN 978-2-7021-0001-1.
