= Jadour Haddou =

Moroccan middle-distance runner (1949–2022)

Hamadi Haddou
Personal information
- Nationality: Moroccan
- Born: January 1, 1949 Khemisset, Morocco
- Died: September 11, 2022 (aged 73) Salé, Morocco
- Height: 168 cm (5 ft 6 in)
- Weight: 64 kg (141 lb)

Sport
- Sport: Middle-distance running
- Event: 1500 metres

Jaddour Hamadi Ben Haddou (Arabic: جعدور حمادي بن حدو; born in Khemisset 1 January 1949 – died in Salé, 11 September 2022) was a Moroccan middle-distance runner. He competed in the men's 1500 metres at the 1968 Summer Olympics.

== Achievements ==
=== Maghreb Championships ===
- Gold medal in 1500 m at the 1967 Maghreb Championships
- Gold medal in 5000 m at the 1967 Maghreb Championships
- Gold medal in 800 m at the 1969 Maghreb Championships
- Bronze medal in 5000 m at the 1971 Maghreb Championships
- Gold medal in 5000 m at the 1975 Maghreb Championships

=== Mediterranean Games ===
- Bronze medal in 5000 m at the 1971 Mediterranean Games
- Silver medal in 5000 m at the 1975 Mediterranean Games

=== International Military Sports Council ===
- 1971 IMSC world champion in Italy
- 1972 IMSC world champion in Tunis
- 1975 IMSC world champion in Algiers

=== Other titles and participations of Jadour Haddou ===
- 15 titles of the Moroccan Championships
- semi-finalist in 1500 m at the 1968 Summer Olympics in Mexico
- 1972 Summer Olympics in Munich
