= René Combes =

French long-distance runner

Personal information
- Nationality: French
- Born: 24 June 1937 (age 89) Toulouse, France

Sport
- Sport: Long-distance running
- Event: Marathon

René Combes (born 24 June 1937) is a French long-distance runner.

== Career ==
He competed in the marathon at the 1968 Summer Olympics.
