= Labidi Ayachi =

Tunisian middle-distance runner

Personal information
- Full name: Labidi Djaouadi Ayachi
- Nationality: Tunisian
- Born: 15 March 1938 (age 87)

Sport
- Sport: Middle-distance running
- Event: Steeplechase

Labidi Djaouadi Ayachi (born 15 March 1938) is a Tunisian middle-distance runner. He competed in the 3000 metres steeplechase at the 1964 Summer Olympics and the 1968 Summer Olympics.
