= Lachie Stewart =

Scottish distance runner (1943–2025)

- Stewart celebrating his victory in the 10,000m final at the 1970 Commonwealth Games

Personal information
- Born: 22 June 1943 Alexandria, Scotland
- Died: 31 May 2025 (aged 81) Paisley, Scotland
- Height: 1.70 m (5 ft 7 in)
- Weight: 58 kg (128 lb)

Sport
- Sport: Athletics
- Event: Long distance
- Club: Shettleston Harriers, Glasgow
Medal record
Representing Scotland
Commonwealth Games
Gold medal – first place	1970 Edinburgh	10,000m

Joseph Laughlin Stewart (22 June 1943 – 31 May 2025) was a Scottish distance runner, and an inductee in the Scottish Sports Hall of Fame and competed for Great Britain in the 10,000 metres at the 1972 Summer Olympics.

== Biography ==
Stewart was born on 22 June 1943 in Alexandria, Vale of Leven, to Jack, a baker, and his wife Greta, who raised him with his sister Elizabeth. He attended Vale of Leven Academy, where his physical education teacher first noticed his running potential. He trained with the local harriers' club of the Vale of Leven, whom he represented in competition until 1968, when he moved to Glasgow and joined the Shettleston Harriers.

Stewart finished third behind Maurice Herriott in the steeplechase event at the 1966 AAA Championships and the following year finished third again but this time in the 6 miles event behind Jürgen Haase and Lajos Mecser at the 1967 AAA Championships but by virtue of being the highest placed British athlete was considered the British 6 miles champion.

Stewart's greatest athletic achievement was competing at the 1970 Commonwealth Games in Edinburgh, where he won the gold medal in the 10,000 metres. He defeated Ron Clarke of Australia in the final.

Stewart finished second behind Dave Bedford in the 10,000 metres event at the 1972 AAA Championships and shortly afterwards he represented Great Britain at the 1972 Olympics Games in Munich, in the 10,000 metres event.

Stewart worked as a dental technician for more than 40 years. He died in Paisley on 31 May 2025, at the age of 81.
