= Thomas O'Riordan =

Irish long-distance runner (1937–2022)

Personal information
- Nationality: Irish
- Born: 12 July 1937 Tubrid, Ardfert, County Kerry, Ireland
- Died: 20 June 2022 (aged 84) Rathmines, Dublin, Ireland
- Height: 178 cm (5 ft 10 in)
- Weight: 66 kg (146 lb)

Sport
- Sport: Long-distance running
- Event: 5000 metres
- Club: Donore Harriers, Dublin

Thomas Brendan O'Riordan (12 July 1937 – 20 June 2022) was an Irish long-distance runner who competed at the 1964 Summer Olympics.

== Biography ==
O'Riordan finished second behind Bruce Tulloh in the 3 miles event at the 1963 AAA Championships.

At the 1964 Olympic Games in Tokyo, he represented Ireland in the men's 5000 metres.

O'Riordan ran collegiately at Idaho State University in Pocatello, Idaho, where he won the 1959 NAIA Men's Cross Country Championship individual title. O'Riordan was inducted into the Idaho State University Hall of Fame in 1979.

He later worked for many years as the athletics correspondent for the Irish Independent. O'Riordan died on 20 June 2022 at the age of 84.
