= Noël Tijou =

French long-distance runner (1941–2023)

Personal information
- Nationality: French
- Born: 12 December 1941 La Jubaudière, German-occupied France
- Died: 23 September 2023 (aged 81) Les Sables-d'Olonne, France
- Height: 176 cm (5 ft 9 in)
- Weight: 69 kg (152 lb)

Sport
- Sport: Long-distance running
- Event: 10,000 metres
- Club: ES Epinal

Noël Tijou (12 December 1941 – 23 September 2023) was a French long-distance runner. He competed in the men's 10,000 metres at the 1972 Summer Olympics. Tijou died in Les Sables-d'Olonne on 23 September 2023, at the age of 81.

Tijou finished third behind Dave Bedford in the 10,000m event at the British 1971 AAA Championships.
