= Athletics at the 1971 Mediterranean Games =

- Dates: 12 – 17 October
- Host city: (Turkey) İzmir
- Venue: Atatürk Stadium
- Events: 24 + 8
- Participation: 12 nations

Athletics at the 1971 Mediterranean Games were held in İzmir, Turkey and lasted from 12 to 17 October.

== Medal table ==
* Host nation (Turkey)

Rank	Nation	Gold	Silver	Bronze	Total
1	Italy	12	11	2	25
2	Greece	6	3	4	13
3	Yugoslavia	5	5	9	19
4	France	4	2	3	9
5	Spain	2	5	6	13
6	Tunisia	2	2	0	4
7	Egypt	1	1	0	2
8	Turkey*	0	2	4	6
9	Morocco	0	1	3	4
10	Algeria	0	0	1	1
Totals (10 entries)		32	32	32	96

== Medal summary ==
=== Men's events ===
Event	Gold		Silver		Bronze	
100 metres (wind: +0.1 m/s)	Vasilis Papageorgopoulos (GRE)	10.4	Mohamed Belkhodja (TUN)	10.7	Ivica Karasi (YUG)	10.7
200 metres (wind: +0.1 m/s)	Pietro Mennea (ITA)	20.7 GR	Ivica Karasi (YUG)	21.2	Predrag Križan (YUG)	21.4
400 metres	Kyriakos Onisiforou (GRE)	46.9 GR	Giacomo Puosi (ITA)	47.1	Luciano Sušanj (YUG)	47.2
800 metres	Mansour Guettaya (TUN)	1:47.6 GR	Jože Međimurec (YUG)	1:48.1	Azzedine Azzouzi (ALG)	1:48.2
1500 metres	Mansour Guettaya (TUN)	3:46.5 GR	Franco Arese (ITA)	3:47.6	Mehmet Tümkan (TUR)	3:48.8
5000 metres	Javier Álvarez (ESP)	13:37.2 GR	Mohammed Gammoudi (TUN)	13:40.8	Jadour Haddou (MAR)	13:44.0
10,000 metres	Javier Álvarez (ESP)	28:52.2 GR	Mariano Haro (ESP)	28:54.4	Giuseppe Cindolo (ITA)	28:59.0
Marathon	Gian Battista Bassi (ITA)	2:23:33	Hüseyin Aktaş (TUR)	2:24.14	İsmail Akçay (TUR)	2:28.35
110 metres hurdles (wind: +0.3 m/s)	Guy Drut (FRA)	13.7 GR	Sergio Liani (ITA)	14.2	Efstratios Vassiliou (GRE)	14.2
400 metres hurdles	Stavros Tziortzis (GRE)	51.0 GR	Manuel Soriano (ESP)	51.2	Francisco Suárez (ESP)	51.4
3000 m steeplechase	Jean-Paul Villain (FRA)	8:30.0 GR	Spyridon Kondossoros (GRE)	8:35.4	Umberto Risi (ITA)	8:40.8
4×100 metres relay	Italy; Ennio Preatoni; Pasqualino Abeti; Vincenzo Guerini; Pietro Mennea	39.7 GR	Yugoslavia; Ivan Karasi; Predrag Križan; Miro Kocuvan; Luciano Sušanj	40.5	Morocco; Moulay Ahmed Hasnaoui; Omar Ghizlat; Omar Chokmane; Mohamed El Kheir	41.1
4×400 metres relay	Italy; Sergio Bello; Daniele Giovanardi; Lorenzo Cellerino; Giacomo Puosi	3:07.5 GR	Yugoslavia; Ivan Karasi; Miro Kocuvan; Jože Međimurec; Luciano Sušanj	3:08.1	Morocco; Moulay Ahmed Hasnaoui; Omar Ghizlat; Salah Fettouh; Omar Chokmane	3:08.4
20 km walk	Pasquale Busca (ITA)	1:36:55 GR	Victor Campos (ESP)	1:41:11	Agustin Jorba (ESP)	1:47:03
50 km walk	Abdon Pamich (ITA)	4:21:21 GR	Vittorio Visini (ITA)	4:29:19	Hasan Oz (TUR)	4:54:06
High jump	Gian Marco Schivo (ITA)	2.11 m	Ioannis Koussoulas (GRE)	2.11 m	Dimitrios Patronis (GRE)	2.08 m
Pole vault	Christos Papanikolaou (GRE)	5.20 m GR	Ignacio Sola (ESP)	4.70 m	Théodoros Tongas (GRE)	4.50 m
Long jump	Jack Pani (FRA)	7.90 m GR	Miljenko Rak (YUG)	7.78 m	Mariano Perez (ESP)	7.40 m
Triple jump	Milan Spasojević (YUG)	16.18 m	Apostolos Kathiniotis (GRE)	15.84 m	Jésus Bartholomé (ESP)	15.68 m
Shot put	Nagui Asaad (EGY)	20.19 m GR	Lahcen Samsam Akka (MAR)	18.85 m	Yves Brouzet (FRA)	18.69 m
Discus throw	Silvano Simeon (ITA)	57.64 m GR	Nagui Asaad (EGY)	54.72 m	Marian Gredelj (YUG)	54.32 m
Hammer throw	Georgios Georgiadis (GRE)	68.76 m GR	Mario Vecchiato (ITA)	67.64 m	Srećko Štiglić (YUG)	66.28 m
Javelin throw	Renzo Cramerotti (ITA)	78.04 m GR	Recep Kalender (TUR)	61.34 m	Ali Aydin (TUR)	59.80 m
Decathlon	Vassilios Sevastis (GRE)	7222 pts GR	Rafael Cano (ESP)	7072 pts	Pedro Pablo Fernandez (ESP)	6934 pts

=== Women's events ===
Event	Gold		Silver		Bronze	
100 metres	Cecilia Molinari (ITA)	11.9	Nicole Pani (FRA)	12.0	Michèle Beugnet (FRA)	12.1
400 metres	Colette Besson (FRA)	53.0	Donata Govoni (ITA)	54.4	Josefina Salgado (ESP)	56.0
800 metres	Vera Nikolić (YUG)	2:02.2	Donata Govoni (ITA)	2:04.9	Colette Besson (FRA)	2:07.2
1500 metres	Vera Nikolić (YUG)	4:20.3	Paola Pigni (ITA)	4:22.6	Đurđica Rajher (YUG)	4:23.0
100 metres hurdles	Milena Leskovac (YUG)	14.0	Ileana Ongar (ITA)	14.1	Đurđa Fočić (YUG)	14.5
4×100 metres relay	Italy; Maddalena Grassano; Laura Nappi; Ileana Ongar; Cecilia Molinari	45.6	France; Colette Besson; Michèle Beugnet; Nicole Pani; Odette Ducas	45.6	Yugoslavia; Đurđa Fočić; Milena Leskovac; Breda Babošek; Vera Nikolić	48.4
High jump	Snežana Hrepevnik (YUG)	1.77 m GR	Sara Simeoni (ITA)	1.74 m	Breda Babošek (YUG)	1.74 m
Discus throw	Roberta Grottini (ITA)	48.90 m	Maria Stella Masocco (ITA)	47.44 m	Despina Kafenidou (GRE)	46.06 m

== Men's results ==
=== 100 meters ===
Heats – 12 October
Wind:

Rank	Heat	Name	Nationality	Time	Notes
1	2	Manuel Carballo	Spain	10.5	Q
5	1	Vincenzo Guerini	Italy	10.6	
3	2	Ennio Preatoni	Italy	10.7	Q

Final – 13 October
Wind: +0.1 m/s

Rank	Name	Nationality	Time	Notes
1st place, gold medalist(s)	Vasilis Papageorgopoulos	Greece	10.4	
2nd place, silver medalist(s)	Mohamed Belkhodja	Tunisia	10.7	
3rd place, bronze medalist(s)	Ivica Karasi	Yugoslavia	10.7	
4	Manuel Carballo	Spain	10.8	
5	Hamouda El Fray	Tunisia	10.8	
6	Ennio Preatoni	Italy	10.8	
7	Predrag Križan	Yugoslavia	10.9	
8	Omar Chokhmane	Morocco	11.0	

=== 200 meters ===
Heats
Wind:

Rank	Heat	Name	Nationality	Time	Notes
1	1	Pietro Mennea	Italy	21.1	Q
1	2	Luigi Benedetti	Italy	21.6	Q

Final – 16 October
Wind: +0.1 m/s

Rank	Name	Nationality	Time	Notes
1st place, gold medalist(s)	Pietro Mennea	Italy	20.7	
2nd place, silver medalist(s)	Ivica Karasi	Yugoslavia	21.2	
3rd place, bronze medalist(s)	Predrag Križan	Yugoslavia	21.4	
4	Omar Chokhmane	Morocco	21.4	
5	Luigi Benedetti	Italy	21.5	
6	Georgios Mikelidis	Greece	21.7	
7	Ertuğrul Oğulbulan	Turkey	22.2	
	Salah Fettouh	Morocco	DNS	

=== 400 meters ===
Heats – 13 October

Rank	Heat	Name	Nationality	Time	Notes
1	1	Giacomo Puosi	Italy	47.3	Q
2	1	Kyriakos Onisiforou	Greece	47.4	Q
3	1	Moulay Ahmed Hasnaoui	Morocco	47.5	Q
4	1	Moktar Herzi	Tunisia	47.5	Q
5	1	Miro Kocuvan	Yugoslavia	47.6	
6	1	Alfonso Gabernet	Spain	47.6	
7	1	Gunejill	Algeria	49.8	
8	1	?	Lebanon	49.9	
1	2	Manuel Gayoso	Spain	47.7	Q
2	2	Luciano Sušanj	Yugoslavia	47.9	Q
3	2	Sergio Bello	Italy	48.0	Q
4	2	Omar Ghizlat	Morocco	48.1	Q
5	2	Mohammed Ghadri	Tunisia	48.1	
6	2	Ergenc	Turkey	49.9	
7	2	Hamden	Lebanon	50.1	

Final – 14 October

Rank	Name	Nationality	Time	Notes
1st place, gold medalist(s)	Kyriakos Onisiforou	Greece	46.9	
2nd place, silver medalist(s)	Giacomo Puosi	Italy	47.1	
3rd place, bronze medalist(s)	Luciano Sušanj	Yugoslavia	47.2	
4	Omar Ghizlat	Morocco	47.3	
5	Sergio Bello	Italy	47.4	
6	Manuel Gayoso	Spain	47.7	
7	Moktar Herzi	Tunisia	47.7	
8	Moulay Ahmed Hasnaoui	Morocco	47.8	

=== 800 meters ===
Heats – 15 October

Rank	Heat	Name	Nationality	Time	Notes
1	1	Stavros Mermingis	Greece	1:49.7	Q
2	1	Azzedine Azzouzi	Algeria	1:50.7	Q
3	1	Jože Međimurec	Yugoslavia	1:51.1	Q
4	1	Antonio Fernández	Spain	1:51.1	Q
5	1	Mehmet Tümkan	Turkey	1:51.1	
1	2	Mansour Guettaya	Tunisia	1:50.9	Q
2	2	Francisco Morera	Spain	1:51.1	Q
3	2	Sid Ali Djouadi	Algeria	1:51.3	Q
4	2	Slavko Koprivica	Yugoslavia	1:51.4	Q
5	2	Mohamed Hayachi	Morocco	1:51.4	

Final – 16 October

Rank	Name	Nationality	Time	Notes
1st place, gold medalist(s)	Mansour Guettaya	Tunisia	1:47.6	
2nd place, silver medalist(s)	Jože Međimurec	Yugoslavia	1:48.1	
3rd place, bronze medalist(s)	Azzedine Azzouzi	Algeria	1:48.2	
4	Slavko Koprivica	Yugoslavia	1:48.4	
5	Francisco Morera	Spain	1:49.0	
6	Stavros Mermingis	Greece	1:50.0	
7	Sid Ali Djouadi	Algeria	1:51.0	
8	Antonio Fernández	Spain	1:53.7	

=== 1500 meters ===
Heats – 12 October

Rank	Heat	Name	Nationality	Time	Notes
1	1	Jacky Boxberger	France	3:53.6	Q
2	1	Mehmet Tümkan	Turkey	3:53.7	Q
3	1	Slavko Koprivica	Yugoslavia	3:53.8	Q
4	1	Antonio Burgos	Spain	3:54.1	Q
5	1	Kamel Guemar	Algeria	3:54.2	Q
1	2	Franco Arese	Italy	4:08.8	Q

Final – 13 October

Rank	Name	Nationality	Time	Notes
1st place, gold medalist(s)	Mansour Guettaya	Tunisia	3:46.5	
2nd place, silver medalist(s)	Franco Arese	Italy	3:47.6	
3rd place, bronze medalist(s)	Mehmet Tümkan	Turkey	3:48.8	
4	Mohamed Hayachi	Morocco	3:49.5	
5	Hamida Gammoudi	Tunisia	3:52.2	
6	Mohamed Gouasmi	Algeria	3:52.8	
7	Slavko Koprivica	Yugoslavia	3:53.2	
8	Antonio Burgos	Spain	3:55.3	
	Jacky Boxberger	France	DNF	

=== 5000 meters ===
Heats – 12 October

Rank	Heat	Name	Nationality	Time	Notes
1	1	Mohamed Gammoudi	Tunisia	14:14.8	Q
2	1	Raymond Zembri	France	14:17.6	Q
3	1	Jaddour Haddou	Morocco	14:18.4	Q
4	1	Ioannis Birbilis	Greece	14:19.0	Q
5	1	Ramon Tasende	Spain	14:22.8	Q
6	1	Chérif Benali	Algeria	14:45.0	Q
7	1	Musa Kalemoğlu	Turkey	15:04.4	
1	2	Hamza Canavar	Turkey	14:49.8	Q
2	2	Abdel Hamid Khamis	Egypt	14:57.4	Q
3	2	Chérif Hannachi	Tunisia	14:57.6	Q
4	2	Giuseppe Cindolo	Italy	15:10.8	Q
5	2	Javier Álvarez	Spain	15:10.8	Q
6	2	Mohamed Gouasmi	Algeria	15:14.2	Q
7	2	Al Deff	Syria	15:17.0	

Final – 14 October

Rank	Name	Nationality	Time	Notes
1st place, gold medalist(s)	Javier Álvarez	Spain	13:37.2	
2nd place, silver medalist(s)	Mohamed Gammoudi	Tunisia	13:40.8	
3rd place, bronze medalist(s)	Jaddour Haddou	Morocco	13:44.0	
4	Ramon Tasende	Spain	13:57.8	
5	Giuseppe Cindolo	Italy	14:08.6	
6	Abdel Hamid Khamis	Egypt	14:13.2	
7	Ioannis Birbilis	Greece	14:21.4	
8	Chérif Hannachi	Tunisia	14:27.0	
9	Mohamed Gouasmi	Algeria	??:??.?	
10	Hamza Canavar	Turkey	??:??.?	
11	Chérif Benali	Algeria	??:??.?	
	Raymond Zembri	France	DNF	

=== 10,000 meters ===
16 October

Rank	Name	Nationality	Time	Notes
1st place, gold medalist(s)	Javier Álvarez	Spain	28:52.2	
2nd place, silver medalist(s)	Mariano Haro	Spain	28:54.4	
3rd place, bronze medalist(s)	Giuseppe Cindolo	Italy	28:59.0	
4	Abdelkader Zaddem	Tunisia	29:18.4	
5	Abdel Hamid Khamis	Egypt	30:04.2	
6	Ioannis Birbilis	Greece	30:30.8	
7	Mohamed Gouasmi	Algeria	30:33.8	
8	Hamza Canavar	Turkey	30:38.0	
9	A. Fitos	Turkey	31:41.6	
	Mohamed Gammoudi	Tunisia	DNF	

=== Marathon ===
17 October

Rank	Name	Nationality	Time	Notes
1st place, gold medalist(s)	Gian Battista Bassi	Italy	2:23:33	
2nd place, silver medalist(s)	Hüseyin Aktaş	Turkey	2:24:14	
3rd place, bronze medalist(s)	İsmail Akçay	Turkey	2:28:35	
4	Agustín Fernández	Spain	2:34:02	
5	Stamatios Milas	Greece	2:36:43	
6	Francesco Amante	Italy	2:40:17	
7	Souleiman Tabet	Syria	2:53:12	
	Mariano Haro	Spain	DNF	

=== 110 meters hurdles ===
Heats – 14 October
Wind:

Rank	Heat	Name	Nationality	Time	Notes
1	2	Sergio Liani	Italy	14.2	Q
1	1	Guy Drut	France	14.3	Q
2	1	Marco Acerbi	Italy	14.5	Q

Final – 15 October
Wind: +0.3 m/s

Rank	Name	Nationality	Time	Notes
1st place, gold medalist(s)	Guy Drut	France	13.7	
2nd place, silver medalist(s)	Sergio Liani	Italy	14.2	
3rd place, bronze medalist(s)	Efstratios Vassiliou	Greece	14.2	
4	Nurullah Candan	Turkey	14.8	
5	Abdelkader Boudjemaa	Algeria	15.0	
6	Cumaa Ammami	Lebanon	15.1	
7	Murat Kaçar	Turkey	15.4	
	Marco Acerbi	Italy	DNS	

=== 400 meters hurdles ===
Heats – 12 October

Rank	Heat	Name	Nationality	Time	Notes
2	1	Daniele Giovardini	Italy	52.0	Q
1	2	Francisco Suárez	Spain	52.1	Q
3	1	Manuel Soriano	Spain	52.3	Q
2	2	Alessandro Scatena	Italy	53.4	Q

Final – 13 October

Rank	Name	Nationality	Time	Notes
1st place, gold medalist(s)	Stavros Tziortzis	Greece	51.0	
2nd place, silver medalist(s)	Manuel Soriano	Spain	51.2	
3rd place, bronze medalist(s)	Francisco Suárez	Spain	51.4	
4	Daniele Giovardini	Italy	51.5	
5	Alessandro Scatena	Italy	51.9	
6	Georgios Birmbilis	Greece	53.0	
7	Hassan Bergaoui	Tunisia	53.0	
8	Abdallah Rouine	Tunisia	53.3	

=== 3000 meters steeplechase ===
16 October

Rank	Name	Nationality	Time	Notes
1st place, gold medalist(s)	Jean-Paul Villain	France	8:30.0	
2nd place, silver medalist(s)	Spyridon Kondossoros	Greece	8:35.4	
3rd place, bronze medalist(s)	Umberto Risi	Italy	8:40.8	
4	Boualem Rahoui	Algeria	8:47.8	
5	Panagiotis Nakopoulos	Greece	8:48.2	
6	Vicente Egido	Spain	8:56.0	
7	Julio Gude	Spain	8:56.2	
8	Murat Tascioglu	Turkey	9:19.6	
9	Mehmet Akgün	Turkey	9:23.8	
10	Khalife	Syria	9:26.6	

=== 4 × 100 meters relay ===
15 October

Rank	Nation	Competitors	Time	Notes
1st place, gold medalist(s)	Italy	Ennio Preatoni, Pasqualino Abeti, Vincenzo Guerini, Pietro Mennea	39.7	GR
2nd place, silver medalist(s)	Yugoslavia	Ivan Karasi, Predrag Križan, Miro Kocuvan, Luciano Sušanj	40.5	
3rd place, bronze medalist(s)	Morocco	Moulay Ahmed Hasnaoui, Omar Ghizlat, Omar Chokmane, Mohamed El Kheir	41.1	NR
4	Tunisia		41.1	
5	Greece		41.1	
6	Turkey		41.7	

=== 4 × 400 meters relay ===
16 October

Rank	Nation	Competitors	Time	Notes
1st place, gold medalist(s)	Italy	Sergio Bello, Daniele Giovanardi, Gian Lorenzo Cellerino, Giacomo Puosi	3:07.5	GR
2nd place, silver medalist(s)	Yugoslavia	Ivan Karasi, Miro Kocuvan, Jože Međimurec, Luciano Sušanj	3:08.1	NR
3rd place, bronze medalist(s)	Morocco	Moulay Ahmed Hasnaoui, Omar Ghizlat, Salah Fettouh, Omar Chokmane	3:08.4	NR
4	Spain	Alfonso Gabernet, Manuel Gayoso, Francisco Suárez, Manuel Soriano	3:08.7	
5	Greece		3:12.4	
6	Turkey		3:16.5	
7	Libya		3:19.1	

=== 20 kilometers walk ===
12 October

Rank	Name	Nationality	Time	Notes
1st place, gold medalist(s)	Pascale Busca	Italy	1:36:55.0	
2nd place, silver medalist(s)	Victor Campos	Spain	1:41:11.2	
3rd place, bronze medalist(s)	Agustín Jorba	Spain	1:47:03.2	
4	Aynur Aynan	Turkey	1:50:43.6	
	Hasan Öz	Turkey	DNF	
	Georgios Fakiolas	Greece	DNF	
	Abdon Pamich	Italy	DNF	

=== 50 kilometers walk ===
14 October

Rank	Name	Nationality	Time	Notes
1st place, gold medalist(s)	Abdon Pamich	Italy	4:21:21.8	
2nd place, silver medalist(s)	Vittorio Visini	Italy	4:29:19.4	
3rd place, bronze medalist(s)	Hasan Öz	Turkey	4:54:06.6	
4	Aynur Ayhan	Turkey	5:05:02.2	
	Georgios Fakiolas	Greece	DQ	

=== High jump ===
16 October

Rank	Name	Nationality	1.85	1.95	2.00	2.05	2.08	2.11	Result	Notes
1st place, gold medalist(s)	Gian Marco Schivo	Italy							2.11	
2nd place, silver medalist(s)	Ioannis Kousoulas	Greece							2.11	
3rd place, bronze medalist(s)	Dimitrios Patronis	Greece							2.08	
4	Erminio Azzaro	Italy							2.05	
5	Murat Ayata	Turkey							2.00	
6	Luis María Garriga	Spain	–	–	xo	xx			2.00	
7	José Ocio	Spain	o	o	xo	xxx			2.00	
8	Nurullah Candan	Turkey							2.00	
9	Chaouach	Syria							1.90	

=== Pole vault ===
15 October

Rank	Name	Nationality	3.90	4.40	4.50	4.70	4.90	5.20	Result	Notes
1st place, gold medalist(s)	Christos Papanikolaou	Greece							5.20	
2nd place, silver medalist(s)	Ignacio Sola	Spain	–	–	–	xo	xxx		4.70	
3rd place, bronze medalist(s)	Theodoros Tongas	Greece							4.50	
4	Mohamed Alaa Gheyta	Tunisia							4.40	
5	Ömer Giraygil	Turkey							4.40	
6	Mohamed Nasser	Lebanon							4.40	
7	Tayfun Aygun	Turkey							3.90	

=== Long jump ===
13 October

Rank	Name	Nationality	#1	#2	#3	#4	#5	#6	Result	Notes
1st place, gold medalist(s)	Jacques Pani	France							7.90	
2nd place, silver medalist(s)	Miljenko Rak	Yugoslavia							7.78	
3rd place, bronze medalist(s)	Mariano Pérez	Spain	x	x	7.19	7.40	x	x	7.40	
4	Hamed Ezzedine Yacoub	Egypt							7.32	
5	Gürol Dinsel	Turkey							7.15	
6	Sinan Şenulaş	Turkey							7.00	
7	Abdul Majib Touraifi	Syria							6.63	

=== Triple jump ===
15 October

Rank	Name	Nationality	#1	#2	#3	#4	#5	#6	Result	Notes
1st place, gold medalist(s)	Milan Spasojević	Yugoslavia							16.18	
2nd place, silver medalist(s)	Apostolos Kathiniotis	Greece							15.84	
3rd place, bronze medalist(s)	Jésus Bartholomé	Spain	15.31	15.64	15.68	15.21	15.09	x	15.68	
4	Luis Felipe Areta	Spain	15.05	15.64	x	15.33	15.48	15.49	15.64	
5	Aşkın Tuna	Turkey							15.53	
6	Attila Sivri	Turkey							14.54	
7	Slim Kilani	Tunisia							14.22	
8	Abdul Majib Touraifi	Syria							13.84	

=== Shot put ===
12 October

Rank	Name	Nationality	#1	#2	#3	#4	#5	#6	Result	Notes
1st place, gold medalist(s)	Yusuf Nagui Assad	Egypt							20.19	
2nd place, silver medalist(s)	Lahcen Samsam Akka	Morocco							18.85	
3rd place, bronze medalist(s)	Yves Brouzet	France							18.69	
4	Ivan Ivančić	Yugoslavia							18.38	
5	Loukas Louka	Greece							17.62	
6	Milija Jocović	Yugoslavia							17.60	
7	Georgios Lemonis	Greece							17.21	
8	Antonio Herreria	Spain	16.89	x	16.46	x	x	16.07	16.89	

=== Discus throw ===
14 October

Rank	Name	Nationality	Result	Notes
1st place, gold medalist(s)	Slivano Simeon	Italy	57.64	GR
2nd place, silver medalist(s)	Yusuf Nagui Assad	Egypt	54.72	
3rd place, bronze medalist(s)	Marian Gredelj	Yugoslavia	54.32	
4	Stilianos Agloupas	Greece	53.00	
5	Omar Musa Mejbari	Lebanon	45.48	
6	Ahmed Bendiffalah	Algeria	44.58	
7	Abdul Moumen Tujarr	Syria	43.42	
8	Omer Casir	Turkey	43.08	

=== Hammer throw ===
15 October

Rank	Name	Nationality	#1	#2	#3	#4	#5	#6	Result	Notes
1st place, gold medalist(s)	Georgios Georgiadis	Greece							68.76	
2nd place, silver medalist(s)	Mario Vecchiato	Italy							67.64	
3rd place, bronze medalist(s)	Srećko Štiglić	Yugoslavia							66.28	
4	Stevan Gromilović	Yugoslavia							62.98	
5	José Alcantara	Spain	x	59.20	x	59.44	58.94	57.14	59.44	
6	Nurullah İvak	Turkey							53.96	
7	Abdul Moumen Tujarr	Syria							38.22	

=== Javelin throw ===
16 October

Rank	Name	Nationality	Result	Notes
1st place, gold medalist(s)	Renzo Cramerotti	Italy	78.04	GR
2nd place, silver medalist(s)	Recep Kalender	Turkey	61.34	
3rd place, bronze medalist(s)	Ali Aydın	Turkey	59.80	
4	Ghazi Samkari	Syria	57.30	
5	Oussama Chami	Syria	54.24	

=== Decathlon ===
13–14 October

The highest mark recorded in each event is highlighted in yellow

Rank	Athlete	Nationality	100m	LJ	SP	HJ	400m	110m H	DT	PV	JT	1500m	Points	Notes
1st place, gold medalist(s)	Vassilios Sevastis	Greece	11.39	7.09	12.90	1.75	50.8	15.90	39.76	4.00	63.52	4:34.3	7222	
2nd place, silver medalist(s)	Rafael Cano	Spain	11.32	6.93	12.27	1.89	50.5	15.20	31.96	3.70	60.14	4:37.5	7072	
3rd place, bronze medalist(s)	Pedro Pablo Fernández	Spain	11.07	7.23	13.33	1.83	50.1	16.11	43.26	3.00	40.14	4:30.4	6934	
4	Zissis Kourellos	Greece	11.12	7.09	11.83	1.86	50.0	15.58	32.04	3.80	53.00	4:55.8	6907	
5	Mohammed Nasser	Lebanon	11.67	6.37	11.49	1.86	51.7	16.74	36.64	4.35	46.60	4:35.3	6702	
6	Abdelsalam Tabaa	Tunisia	11.48	6.20	11.23	1.75	51.4	16.57	34.14	3.20	45.40	4:23.4	6316	

== Women's results ==
=== 100 meters ===
Heats – 12 October

Rank	Heat	Name	Nationality	Time	Notes
1	1	Michèle Beugnet	France	12.0	Q
2	1	Laura Nappi	Italy	12.1	Q
1	2	Cecilia Molinari	Italy	11.9	Q
2	2	Nicole Pani	France	12.1	Q

Final – 13 October

Rank	Name	Nationality	Time	Notes
1st place, gold medalist(s)	Cecilia Molinari	Italy	11.9	
2nd place, silver medalist(s)	Nicole Pani	France	12.0	
3rd place, bronze medalist(s)	Michèle Beugnet	France	12.1	
4	Laura Nappi	Italy	12.2	
5	Fatima El-Faquir	Morocco	12.8	
6	Suude Koçgil	Turkey	13.0	
7	Ülkü Okay	Turkey	13.1	
8	Saousan Khalife	Syria	13.2	

=== 400 meters ===
16 October

Rank	Name	Nationality	Time	Notes
1st place, gold medalist(s)	Colette Besson	France	53.0	
2nd place, silver medalist(s)	Donata Govoni	Italy	54.4	
3rd place, bronze medalist(s)	Josephina Salgado	Spain	56.0	
4	Malika Hadky	Morocco	56.5	
5	Alia Sorour	Egypt	58.2	
6	Suude Koçgil	Turkey	58.8	
7	Bahriye Doğrulu	Turkey	1:00.3	
8	Georgette Jamal	Syria	1:03.1	

=== 800 meters ===
14 October

Rank	Name	Nationality	Time	Notes
1st place, gold medalist(s)	Vera Nikolić	Yugoslavia	2:02.2	
2nd place, silver medalist(s)	Donata Govoni	Italy	2:04.9	
3rd place, bronze medalist(s)	Colette Besson	France	2:07.2	
4	Freixa Del Pilar	Spain	2:12.5	
5	Alia Sorour	Egypt	2:14.6	
6	Hadhoum Khadiri	Morocco	2:14.6	
7	Nese Karatepe	Turkey	2:16.0	
8	Ülker Atlı	Turkey	2:19.0	

=== 1500 meters ===
15 October

Rank	Name	Nationality	Time	Notes
1st place, gold medalist(s)	Vera Nikolić	Yugoslavia	4:20.3	
2nd place, silver medalist(s)	Paola Pigni	Italy	4:22.6	
3rd place, bronze medalist(s)	Đurďica Rajher	Yugoslavia	4:23.0	
4	Belén Azpeitia	Spain	4:23.8	NR
5	Angela Ramello	Italy	4:26.6	
6	Nese Karatepe	Turkey	4:32.4	
7	Hadhoum Khadiri	Morocco	4:37.0	
8	Consuelo Alonso	Spain	4:37.6	
9	Ülker Atlı	Turkey	4:41.1	
10	Malak Nasser	Syria	5:32.9	

=== 100 meters hurdles ===
Heats – 13 October

Rank	Heat	Name	Nationality	Time	Notes
1	1	Milena Leskovac	Yugoslavia	14.1	Q
2	1	Odette Ducas	France	15.2	Q
3	1	Ana María Molina	Spain	15.6	Q, NR
4	1	Saousan Khalife	Syria	16.7	Q
5	1	Müfide Dinc	Turkey	18.1	

Final – 14 October

Rank	Name	Nationality	Time	Notes
1st place, gold medalist(s)	Milena Leskovac	Yugoslavia	14.0	
2nd place, silver medalist(s)	Ileana Ongar	Italy	14.1	
3rd place, bronze medalist(s)	Đurđa Fočić	Yugoslavia	14.5	
4	Odette Ducas	France	15.6	
5	Cherifa Meskaoui	Morocco	15.6	
6	Ana María Molina	Spain	15.7	
7	Saousan Khalife	Syria	16.7	
8	Eser Ercan	Turkey	17.6	

=== 4 × 100 meters relay ===
15 October

Rank	Nation	Competitors	Time	Notes
1st place, gold medalist(s)	Italy	Maddalena Grassano, Laura Nappi, Ileana Ongar, Cecilia Molinari	45.6	
2nd place, silver medalist(s)	France	Colette Besson, Michèle Beugnet, Nicole Pani, Odette Ducas	45.6	
3rd place, bronze medalist(s)	Yugoslavia	Đurđa Fočić, Milena Leskovac, Breda Babošek, Vera Nikolić	48.4	
4	Turkey		49.6	

=== High jump ===
15 October

Rank	Name	Nationality	1.45	1.50	1.53	1.56	1.59	1.65	1.74	1.77	Result	Notes
1st place, gold medalist(s)	Snežana Hrepevnik	Yugoslavia									1.77	
2nd place, silver medalist(s)	Sara Simeoni	Italy									1.74	
3rd place, bronze medalist(s)	Breda Babošek	Yugoslavia									1.74	
4	Teresa Roca	Spain	o	o	o	o	xo	xxx			1.59	
5	Carmen Palacios	Spain	o	xxo	xxo	o	xxx				1.56	
6	Gülden Erdoǧan	Turkey									1.45	

=== Discus throw ===
12 October

Rank	Name	Nationality	Result	Notes
1st place, gold medalist(s)	Roberta Grottini	Italy	48.90	
2nd place, silver medalist(s)	Maria Stella Masocco	Italy	47.44	
3rd place, bronze medalist(s)	Despina Kafenidou	Greece	46.06	
4	Chérifa Meskaoui	Morocco	38.60	
5	Aynur Taşdemir	Turkey	36.14	
6	Gülser Apaydın	Turkey	34.12	
7	Iman Jalabi	Syria	27.50	
