= Italy at the 1971 Mediterranean Games =

- IOC code: ITA
- NOC: Italian National Olympic Committee

in İzmir
- Medals Ranked 1st: Gold 51 Silver 38 Bronze 30 Total 119

Mediterranean Games appearances (overview)
- 1951; 1955; 1959; 1963; 1967; 1971; 1975; 1979; 1983; 1987; 1991; 1993; 1997; 2001; 2005; 2009; 2013; 2018; 2022; 2026

Italy competed at the 1971 Mediterranean Games in İzmir, Turkey.

== By sport ==
Sport	Gold	Silver	Bronze	Total
Athletics	12	11	2	25
Boxing	1	1	6	8
Cycling	2	3	0	5
Diving	2	2	0	4
Fencing	3	1	2	6
Gymnastics	6	4	6	16
Judo	2	0	1	3
Sailing	1	1	1	3
Shooting	2	2	2	6
Swimming	15	9	6	30
Tennis	0	0	1	1
Water polo	0	1	0	1
Weightlifting	4	2	1	7
Wrestling	1	2	1	4
Total	51	39	29	119

=== Men ===
Event	1st place, gold medalist(s)	2nd place, silver medalist(s)	3rd place, bronze medalist(s)
200 metres	Pietro Mennea		
Marathon	Gian Battista Bassi		
20 km walk	Pasquale Busca		
50 km walk	Abdon Pamich	Vittorio Visini	
High jump	Gian Marco Schivo		
Discus throw	Silvano Siméon		
Javelin throw	Renzo Cramerotti		
4×100 metres relay	Ennio Preatoni; Pasqualino Abeti; Vincenzo Guerini; Pietro Mennea		
4×400 metres relay	Sergio Bello; Daniele Giovanardi; Gian Lorenzo Cellerino; Giacomo Puosi		
400 metres		Giacomo Puosi	
1500 metres		Franco Arese	
110 metres hurdles		Sergio Liani	
Hammer throw		Mario Vecchiato	
5000 metres			Giuseppe Cindolo
3000 metres steeplechase			Umberto Risi
	9	5	2

=== Women ===
Event	1st place, gold medalist(s)	2nd place, silver medalist(s)	3rd place, bronze medalist(s)
100 metres	Cecilia Molinari		
Discus throw	Roberta Grottini	Maria Stella Masocco	
4×100 metres relay	Maddalena Grassano; Laura Nappi; Ileana Ongar; Cecilia Molinari		
400 metres		Donata Govoni	
800 metres		Donata Govoni	
1500 metres		Paola Pigni	
100 metres hurdles		Ileana Ongar	
High jump		Sara Simeoni	
	3	6	0

== See also ==
- Boxing at the 1971 Mediterranean Games
- Volleyball at the 1971 Mediterranean Games
- Water polo at the 1971 Mediterranean Games
