= 1971 Italian Athletics Championships =

- Dates: 7–8 July
- Host city: Rome
- Level: Senior

The 1971 Italian Athletics Championships was the 61st edition of the Italian Athletics Championships and were held in Rome (track & field events).

== Champions ==
=== Men ===
| Event | Athlete | Performance |
|---|---|---|
| 100 metres | Norberto Oliosi | 10.3 |
| 200 metres | Pietro Mennea | 21.0 |
| 400 metres | Marcello Fiasconaro | 45.7 |
| 800 metres | Sandro Castelli | 1:51.5 |
| 1500 metres | Renzo Finelli | 3:49.9 |
| 5000 metres | Francesco Arese | 14:12.8 |
| 10,000 metres | Giuseppe Cindolo | 29:13.2 |
| 110 metres hurdles | Sergio Liani | 13.8 |
| 400 metres hurdles | Giorgio Ballati | 50.8 |
| 3000 metres steeplechase | Francesco Valenti | 8:41.6 |
| High jump | Erminio Azzaro | 2.15 |
| Pole vault | Renato Dionisi | 5.00 |
| Long jump | Ildebrando Fozzi | 7.50 |
| Triple jump | Giuseppe Gentile | 16.01 |
| Shot put | Renato Bergonzoni | 17.78 |
| Discus throw | Silvano Simeon | 59.98 |
| Hammer throw | Mario Vecchiato | 67.62 |
| Javelin throw | Renzo Cramerotti | 80.80* |
| Decathlon | Sergio Rossetti | 7037 |
| Half Marathon | Francesco Amante | 59:43# |
| Marathon | Giovanbattista Bassi | 02:19:19 |
| 10,000 metres track walk | - | - |
| 20 km road walk | Pasquale Busca | 01:33:00 |
| 50 km road walk | Vittorio Visini | 04:46:45 |
| Cross country (long course) | Renato Martini | |
| Cross country (short course) | Gianni Del Buono | |

=== Women ===
| Event | Athlete | Performance |
|---|---|---|
| 100 metres | Cecilia Molinari | 11.7 |
| 200 metres | Maddalena Grassano | 24.7 |
| 400 metres | Donata Govoni | 54.6 |
| 800 metres | Angela Ramello | 2:06.1 |
| 1500 metres | Zina Boniolo | 4:30.4 |
| 3000 metres | - | - |
| 100 metres hurdles | Antonella Battaglia | 13.9 |
| 400 metres hurdles | - | - |
| 3000 metres steeplechase | - | - |
| High jump | Sara Simeoni | 1.76 |
| Pole vault | - | - |
| Long jump | Barbara Ridi | 5.96 |
| Triple jump | - | - |
| Shot put | Maria Stella Masocco | 14.69 |
| Discus throw | Roberta Grottini | 48.02 |
| Hammer throw | - | - |
| Javelin throw | Giuliana Amici | 50.12* |
| Pentathlon | Barbara Ridi | 4158p |
| Marathon | - | - |
| Cross country (long course) | Donata Govoni | |
