= 1972 Italian Athletics Championships =

Athletics competition

- Dates: 12–13 July
- Host city: Rome
- Level: Senior

The 1972 Italian Athletics Championships was the 62nd edition of the Italian Athletics Championships and were held in Rome (track & field events).

== Champions ==
=== Men ===
Event	Athlete	Performance
100 metres	Vincenzo Guerini	10.4
200 metres	Pietro Mennea	20.4
400 metres	Marcello Fiasconaro	46.3
800 metres	Francesco Arese	1:49.1
1500 metres	Giulio Riga	3:49.2
5000 metres	Aldo Tomasini	14:13.2
10,000 metres	Giuseppe Cindolo	29:16.8
110 metres hurdles	Giuseppe Buttari	13.7
400 metres hurdles	Giorgio Ballati	50.5
3000 metres steeplechase	Franco Fava	8:48.6
High jump	Gian Marco Schivo	2.16
Pole vault	Silvio Fraquelli	5.00
Long jump	Claudio Hernandez	7.47
Triple jump	Ezio Buzzelli	15.14
Shot put	Michele Sorrenti	17.42
Discus throw	Silvano Simeon	59.96
Hammer throw	Mario Vecchiato	69.74
Javelin throw	Renzo Cramerotti	80.64*
Decathlon	Gianni Modena	7080
Half Marathon	Renato Martini	1:40:21*
Marathon	Francesco Amante	02:26:09
10,000 metres track walk	-	-
20 km road walk	Armando Zambaldo	01:25:32
50 km road walk	Vittorio Visini	04:04:45
Cross country (long course)	Renato Martini	

=== Women ===
Event	Athlete	Performance
100 metres	Cecilia Molinari	11.6
200 metres	Laura Nappi	24.0
400 metres	Silvana Zangirolami	54.9
800 metres	Donata Govoni	2:08.2
1500 metres	Paola Pigni	4:15.3
3000 metres	Bruna Lovisolo	9:54.0
100 metres hurdles	Ileana Ongar	14.1
400 metres hurdles	-	-
3000 metres steeplechase	-	-
High jump	Sara Simeoni	1.71
Pole vault	-	-
Long jump	Barbara Ridi	6.04
Triple jump	-	-
Shot put	Maria Stella Masocco	14.88
Discus throw	Roberta Grottini	49.94
Hammer throw	-	-
Javelin throw	Giuliana Amici	46.90*
Pentathlon	Sara Simeoni	3578p
Marathon	-	-
Cross country (long course)	Angela Ramello	
