= 1970 Italian Athletics Championships =

- Dates: 14–15 July
- Host city: Rome
- Level: Senior

The 1970 Italian Athletics Championships was the 50th edition of the Italian Athletics Championships and were held in Rome (track & field events).

== Champions ==
=== Men ===
Event	Athlete	Performance
100 metres	Ennio Preatoni	10.6
200 metres	Giacomo Puosi	21.2
400 metres	Furio Fusi	47.0
800 metres	Gianni Del Buono	1:49.0
1500 metres	Francesco Arese	3:44.3
5000 metres	Giuseppe Ardizzone	14:06.0
10,000 metres	Giuseppe Cindolo	30:07.4
110 metres hurdles	Sergio Liani	14.2
400 metres hurdles	Sergio Bello	50.7
3000 metres steeplechase	Umberto Risi	8:42.2
High jump	Erminio Azzaro	2.13
Pole vault	Renato Dionisi	5.35
Long jump	Domenico Fontanella	7.50w
Triple jump	Giuseppe Gentile	16.15
Shot put	Renato Bergonzoni	17.39
Discus throw	Silvano Simeon	58.54
Hammer throw	Mario Vecchiato	68.40
Javelin throw	Renzo Cramerotti	79.78*
Decathlon	Sergio Rossetti	6495
Half Marathon	Giocchino De Palma	1:04:11#
Marathon	Toni Ritsch	02:26:58
10,000 metres track walk	-	-
20 km road walk	Vittorio Visini	01:25:26
50 km road walk	Vittorio Visini	04:30:54
Cross country (long course)	Giovanni Pizzi	
Cross country (short course)	Francesco Arese	

=== Women ===
Event	Athlete	Performance
100 metres	Cecilia Molinari	12.3
200 metres	Maria Bruni	25.0
400 metres	Armida Giumanini	55.7
800 metres	Donata Govoni	2:07.2
1500 metres	Paola Pigni	4:16.8
3000 metres	-	-
100 metres hurdles	Antonella Battaglia	14.3
400 metres hurdles	-	-
3000 metres steeplechase	-	-
High jump	Sara Simeoni	1.73
Pole vault	-	-
Long jump	Mariella Baucia	5.82
Triple jump	-	-
Shot put	Silvana Forcellini	13.92
Discus throw	Roberta Grottini	47.76
Hammer throw	-	-
Javelin throw	Giuliana Amici	44.02*
Pentathlon	Magaly Vettorazzo	4342p
Marathon	-	-
Cross country (long course)	Paola Pigni	
