= 1973 Italian Athletics Championships =

- Dates: 10–11 July
- Host city: Rome
- Level: Senior

The 1973 Italian Athletics Championships was the 63rd edition of the Italian Athletics Championships and were held in Rome (track & field events).

== Champions ==
=== Men ===
| Event | Athlete | Performance |
|---|---|---|
| 100 metres | Luigi Benedetti | 10.3 |
| 200 metres | Pietro Mennea | 20.6 |
| 400 metres | Marcello Fiasconaro | 46.8 |
| 800 metres | Francesco Arese | 1:48.6 |
| 1500 metres | Gianni Del Buono | 3:42.4 |
| 5000 metres | Aldo Tomasini | 14:31.8 |
| 10,000 metres | Giuseppe Cindolo | 29:28.8 |
| 110 metres hurdles | Sergio Liani | 13.8 |
| 400 metres hurdles | Daniele Giovanardi | 52.1 |
| 3000 metres steeplechase | Franco Fava | 8:40.8 |
| High jump | Enzo Del Forno | 2.14 |
| Pole vault | Silvio Fraquelli | 5.00 |
| Long jump | Carlo Molinaris | 7.56 |
| Triple jump | Claudio Moretti | 15.57 |
| Shot put | Michele Sorrenti | 18.25 |
| Discus throw | Silvano Simeon | 62.94 |
| Hammer throw | Orlando Barbolini | 64.30 |
| Javelin throw | Renzo Cramerotti | 73.88* |
| Decathlon | Daniele Faraggiana | 6710 |
| Half Marathon | Italo Tentorini | 1:33:28* |
| Marathon | Paolo Accaputo | 02:29:54 |
| 10,000 metres track walk | - | - |
| 20 km road walk | Armando Zambaldo | 01:31:03 |
| 50 km road walk | Vittorio Visini | 04:24:45 |

=== Women ===
| Event | Athlete | Performance |
|---|---|---|
| 100 metres | Cecilia Molinari | 11.3 |
| 200 metres | Laura Nappi | 23.8 |
| 400 metres | Donata Govoni | 54.9 |
| 800 metres | Paola Pigni-Cacchi | 2:03.1 |
| 1500 metres | Gabriella Dorio | 4:27.6 |
| 3000 metres | Margherita Gargano | 9:32.6 |
| 100 metres hurdles | Ileana Ongar | 13.7 |
| 400 metres hurdles | - | - |
| 3000 metres steeplechase | - | - |
| High jump | Sara Simeoni | 1.80 |
| Pole vault | - | - |
| Long jump | Manuela Martinelli | 5.77 |
| Triple jump | - | - |
| Shot put | Cinzia Petrucci | 15.74 |
| Discus throw | Renata Scaglia | 49.10 |
| Hammer throw | - | - |
| Javelin throw | Giuliana Amici | 45.62* |
| Pentathlon | Rita Bottiglieri | 3789p |
| Marathon | - | - |
| Cross country (long course) | Paola Pigni-Cacchi | |
