= 1971 Maghreb Athletics Championships =

5th Maghreb Athletics Championships
- Dates: 27 February
- Host city: Casablanca, Morocco
- Events: 36
- Participation: 3 nations

The 1971 Maghreb Athletics Championships was the fifth edition of the international athletics competition between the countries of the Maghreb: Algeria, Tunisia and Morocco. Organised by the Union des Fédérations d'Athlétisme du Maghreb Uni (Union of Athletics Federations of the United Maghreb), it took place on 27 February in Casablanca, Morocco. It was the second Moroccan city to host the event, after the capital Rabat in 1967. A total of 36 athletics events were contested, 22 for men and 14 for women.

It was the last time that the competition was held on a yearly schedule, with the event becoming a biennial one instead. Morocco topped the medal table courtesy of its complete sweep of the women's titles. Tunisia took second with twelve golds in the men's section, followed by Algeria with five men's golds. Tunisia's performance was led by Mansour Guettaya and Mohamed Gammoudi, who won a middle-distance running and long-distance running double, respectively. In the women's events, Chérifa Meskaoui was the most successful with four individual gold medals, in hurdles, shot put, discus throw, and pentathlon.

== Medal summary ==
=== Men ===
Event	Gold		Silver		Bronze	
100 metres (wind: +2.5 m/s)	Hamouda El Fray (TUN)	10.5w	Omar Chokhman (MAR)	10.5w	Mohamed El Kheir (MAR)	10.7w
200 metres	Omar Chokhman (MAR)	21.2	Omar Ghizlat (MAR)	21.7	Salah Gadri (TUN)	21.9
400 metres	Moulay Ahmed Hasnaoui (MAR)	47.5	Hassen Bergaoui (TUN)	48.3	Omar Ghizlat (MAR)	48.8
800 metres	Mansour Guettaya (TUN)	1:49.2	Amakdouf Mohamed Ayachi (MAR)	1:49.8	Azzedine Azzouzi (ALG)	1:50.1
1500 metres	Mansour Guettaya (TUN)	3:45.4	Amakdouf Mohamed Ayachi (MAR)	3:45.8	Mohamed Kacemi (ALG)	3:47.9
5000 metres	Mohammed Gammoudi (TUN)	14:20.2	Mohamed Gouasmi (ALG)	14:22.6	Jadour Haddou (MAR)	14:27.6
10,000 metres	Mohammed Gammoudi (TUN)	30:16.8	Haddou Ou Moumouh (MAR)	30:25.4	Chérif Hannachi (TUN)	30:48.2
110 m hurdles	Abdelkader Boudjemaa (ALG)	14.4	Jilali Sekouri (MAR)	14.8	Ahmed Boukria (MAR)	15.0
400 m hurdles	Hassen Bergaoui (TUN)	52.5	Moulay Ahmed Hasnaoui (MAR)	53.4	Abdelkader Boudjemaa (ALG)	53.6
3000 metres steeplechase	Miloud Chenna (MAR)	8:56.0	Benassou El Ghazi (MAR)	8:56.8	Boualem Rahoui (ALG)	8:59.0
4×100 m relay	Tunisia (TUN)	42.1	Algeria (ALG)	42.8	Unknown	???
4×400 m relay	Morocco (MAR)	3:15.2	Tunisia (TUN)	3:16.0	Algeria (ALG)	3:20.8
20 km walk	Chédli Ben Ali (TUN)	1:35:17	Jouini (TUN)	1:38:24	Kikou (MAR)	1:41:33
High jump	Tawfik Chaouch (TUN)	1.95 m	Mohamed Rijali (MAR)	1.90 m	Douiri (MAR)	1.90 m
Pole vault	Djamel Bouzerar (ALG)	3.61 m	Jaidane (MAR)	3.61 m	Not awarded	
Long jump	Hocine Boudiffa (ALG)	7.30w m	Houcine Abdelwahid (TUN)	7.26w m	Youssef Khémiri (TUN)	7.25w m
Triple jump	Slim Kilani (TUN)	14.34 m	Lakhdar Merouane (ALG)	14.32 m	Daouda (MAR)	13.95 m
Shot put	Jean-Marie Djebaili (ALG)	16.84 m	Ahmed Bendifallah (ALG)	16.02 m	Ahmed Zone (TUN)	13.30 m
Discus throw	Ahmed Bendifallah (ALG)	48.44 m	Jean-Marie Djebaili (ALG)	45.23 m	Abdelkader Tiouali (MAR)	40.60 m
Hammer throw	Ahmed Chahine (MAR)	43.30 m	Larbi Saïdi (TUN)	42.50 m	Not awarded	
Javelin throw	Ali Memmi (TUN)	63.74 m	Hanifer (TUN)	57.95 m	Youssef Gouider (TUN)	57.20 m
Decathlon	Abdesslem Taaba (TUN)	6215 pts	Youssef Gouider (TUN)	5772 pts	Youcef Boulfelfel (ALG)	5655 pts

=== Women ===
Event	Gold		Silver		Bronze	
100 metres	Malika Hadky (MAR)	12.3	Safia Ben Youssef (TUN)	12.6	Fatima El Faquir (MAR)	12.7
200 metres	Fatima El Faquir (MAR)	25.6	Malika Hadky (MAR)	25.8	Safia Ben Youssef (TUN)	26.7
400 metres	Malika Hadky (MAR)	58.0	Fatima El Faquir (MAR)	59.1	Lamdjadani (ALG)	60.7
800 metres	Hadhoum Kadiri (MAR)	2:15.4	Amina Bourir (MAR)	2:16.7	Souad Dérouiche (TUN)	2:19.2
1500 metres	Hadhoum Kadiri (MAR)	4:48.6	Khaddouj Hanine (MAR)	4:50.8	Jalila Douira (TUN)	4:52.1
100 m hurdles (wind: 3.0 m/s)	Chérifa Meskaoui (MAR)	14.9w	Fatima El Faquir (MAR)	15.2w	Lilia Attia (TUN)	16.1w
4×100 m relay	Morocco (MAR)	50.3	Tunisia (TUN)	50.7	Algeria (ALG)	51.5
4×400 m relay	Morocco (MAR)	4:00.5	Tunisia (TUN)	4:06.5	Algeria (ALG)	4:08.3
High jump	Mina Jebli (MAR)	1.48 m	Lamia Belamlih (MAR)	1.48 m	Messaouda Ouchérif (ALG)	1.45 m
Long jump	Naïma Benboubker (MAR)	5.56 m	Istitene (ALG)	5.46 m	Najia Méziane (MAR)	5.39 m
Shot put	Chérifa Meskaoui (MAR)	11.76 m	Beya Bouabdallah (TUN)	11.04 m	Leïla Chamine (TUN)	10.46 m
Discus throw	Chérifa Meskaoui (MAR)	38.98 m	Beya Bouabdallah (TUN)	31.90 m	Unknown	??? m
Javelin throw	Fatima Aderbach (MAR)	35.16 m	Chedlia Ben Mrad (TUN)	34.26 m	Zaidane (MAR)	32.20 m
Pentathlon	Chérifa Meskaoui (MAR)	4007 pts	Lamia Belamlih (MAR)	3485 pts	Beya Bouabdallah (TUN)	3296 pts
