= 1969 Maghreb Athletics Championships =

3rd Maghreb Athletics Championships
- Dates: 24 and 25 July
- Host city: Tripoli, Libya
- Events: 33
- Participation: 4 nations

The 1969 Maghreb Athletics Championships was the third edition of the international athletics competition between the countries of the Maghreb. Libya, Algeria, Tunisia and Morocco were the competing nations. Organised by the Union des Fédérations d'Athlétisme du Maghreb Uni (Union of Athletics Federations of the United Maghreb), it took place on 24 and 25 July in Tripoli, Libya. It was the first time that Libya competed at the competition. A total of 33 athletics events were contested, 22 for men and 11 for women.

The tournament was evenly contested, with Morocco topped the medal table with ten gold medals. Tunisia were a close second with nine golds, while Algeria and Libya each took seven gold medals. It was the last time that the 80 metres hurdles featured on the programme, being replaced by the international standard 100 metres hurdles from 1970 onwards. Morocco's Malika Hadky had a sprint triple, winning the 100, 200 and 400 metres events. Three men managed individual doubles: Mohammed Gammoudi won both long-distance races; Jadour Haddou was a double middle-distance champion; and Youcef Boulfelfel added a triple jump title to his pentathlon crown.

== Medal summary ==
=== Men ===
Event	Gold		Silver		Bronze	
100 metres	Mohamed Belkhodja (TUN)	10.6	Abdullah Abdulkarim Mehdi (LBA)	10.8	Toufik Chaouch (ALG)	10.8
200 metres	Abdullah Abdulkarim Mehdi (LBA)	21.8	Tubraki Ahmed Ibrahim (LBA)	21.9	Omar Ghizlat (MAR)	21.9
400 metres	Mohamed Djouad (ALG)	48.1	Omar Ghizlat (MAR)	48.3	Moulay Ahmed Hasnaoui (MAR)	48.4
800 metres	Jadour Haddou (MAR)	1:50.0	Mohamed Magar (LBA)	1:50.4	Mansour Guettaya (TUN)	1:50.9
1500 metres	Jadour Haddou (MAR)	3:44.4	Mansour Guettaya (TUN)	3:48.8	Hamida Gammoudi (TUN)	3:49.4
5000 metres	Mohammed Gammoudi (TUN)	14:01.6	Abdelkader Zaddem (TUN)	14:10.2	Mohamed Belhoucine (MAR)	14:27.2
10,000 metres	Mohammed Gammoudi (TUN)	29:46.8	Hannachi M'Hadheb (TUN)	29:59.6	Benomar (MAR)	30:44.8
110 m hurdles	Abdelkader Boudjemaa (ALG)	15.1	Hassan Filahi (MAR)	15.2	Ahmed Boukria (MAR)	15.2
400 m hurdles	Mohamed Khalifa (LBA)	53.1	Chérif Sadok (TUN)	53.1	Abdelkader Boudjemaa (ALG)	54.4
3000 metres steeplechase	Labidi Taoadi Ayachi (TUN)	8:51.4	Boualem Rahoui (ALG)	9:04.0	Sghir Hamdouni (TUN)	9:15.0
4×100 m relay	Libya (LBA)	42.1	Tunisia (TUN)	42.3	Morocco (MAR)	42.3
4×400 m relay	Morocco (MAR)	3:15.5	Tunisia (TUN)	3:18.7	Algeria (ALG)	3:21.5
20 km walk	El Ageli (LBA)	1:47:50	Chédli Ben Ali (TUN)	1:48:03	Not awarded	
High jump	Tawfik Chaouch (TUN)	1.91 m	Douiri (MAR)	1.91 m	Mohamed Abubakar (LBA)	1.85 m
Pole vault	Ali Magrowi (LBA)	3.70 m	Sadou (MAR)	3.50 m	Gadouri (MAR)	3.50 m
Long jump	Mohamed Saad (LBA)	6.91 m	Aboulaziz (TUN)	6.88 m	Youcef Boulfelfel (ALG)	6.78 m
Triple jump	Youcef Boulfelfel (ALG)	14.70 m	Lakhdar Merouane (ALG)	14.11 m	Mohamed Ferjani (TUN)	14.08 m
Shot put	Ahmed Bendifallah (ALG)	15.52 m	Omar Musa Mejbari (LBA)	15.23 m	Noureddine Bendifallah (ALG)	14.16 m
Discus throw	Omar Musa Mejbari (LBA)	45.86 m	Ahmed Bendifallah (ALG)	42.60 m	Rahal Abidat (MAR)	39.94 m
Hammer throw	Ahmed Chahine (MAR)	42.12 m	Noureddine Bendifallah (ALG)	38.46 m	Ramadan Hedi (LBA)	36.80 m
Javelin throw	Youssef Gouider (TUN)	59.86 m	Faraj Ali Safran (LBA)	58.60 m	Maamar Boubekeur (ALG)	56.12 m
Pentathlon	Youcef Boulfelfel (ALG)	3196 pts	Abdesslem Taaba (TUN)	3002 pts	Unknown athlete	??? pts

=== Women ===
Event	Gold		Silver		Bronze	
100 metres	Malika Hadky (MAR)	12.6	Fatma Ben Hdar (TUN)	12.8	Fatima El Faquir (MAR)	12.8?
200 metres	Malika Hadky (MAR)	25.9	Lilia Attia (TUN)	26.2	Fouzia (MAR)	27.1
400 metres	Malika Hadky (MAR)	58.6	Ben Haj (TUN)	62.0	Amina Bourir (MAR)	62.7
800 metres	Fatima Ariane (ALG)	2:21.2	Amina Bourir (MAR)	2:23.5	Zamita (MAR)	2:24.1
80 m hurdles	Fatima El Faquir (MAR)	12.1	Berir (MAR)	12.8	Lilia Attia (TUN)	13.0
4×100 m relay	Morocco (MAR)	50.5	Algeria (ALG)	52.9	Unknown	???
High jump	Farida Chaouch (ALG)	1.53 m	Mina Jebli (MAR)	1.50 m	Beya Bouabdallah (TUN)	1.44 m
Long jump	Nagat (TUN)	5.17 m	Souad Hamza (TUN)	4.90 m	Arbasa (MAR)	4.79 m
Shot put	Beya Bouabdallah (TUN)	10.58 m	Fatima Aderbach (MAR)	10.41 m	Unknown athlete	??? m
Discus throw	Beya Bouabdallah (TUN)	29.92 m	Salah Malika (MAR)	27.06 m	Unknown athlete	??? m
Javelin throw	Fatima Aderbach (MAR)	32.92 m	Chedlia Ben Mrad (TUN)	32.72 m	Unknown athlete	??? m
