= Athletics at the 1973 Summer Universiade – Women's 4 × 100 metres relay =

The women's 4 × 100 metres relay event at the 1973 Summer Universiade was held at the Central Lenin Stadium in Moscow on 19 and 20 August.

== Results ==
=== Heats ===
Rank	Heat	Nation	Athletes	Time	Notes
1	1	East Germany		44.4	Q
2	1	West Germany		45.0	Q
3	1	United States		45.4	Q
4	1	Italy	Paola Bolognesi, Laura Nappi, Maddalena Grassano, Cecilia Molinari	45.7	
1	2	Soviet Union	Tatyana Chernikova, Lyudmila Zharkova, Marina Sidorova, Nadezhda Besfamilnaya	43.86	Q
2	2	Poland		44.5	Q
3	2	Cuba		45.0	Q
	2	Canada		DQ	

=== Final ===
Rank	Nation	Athletes	Time	Notes
1st place, gold medalist(s)	Soviet Union	Tatyana Chernikova, Lyudmila Zharkova, Marina Sidorova, Nadezhda Besfamilnaya	43.99	
2nd place, silver medalist(s)	Poland	Ewa Długołęcka, Barbara Bakulin, Urszula Styranka, Maria Żukowska	44.42	
3rd place, bronze medalist(s)	East Germany	Annerose Krumpholz, Ellen Stropahl, Bärbel Struppert, Doris Maletzki	44.44	
4	West Germany	Christiane Krause, Sigrid Goydke, Annegret Richter, Elfgard Schittenhelm	44.60	
5	Cuba		44.86	
6	United States	Madeline Render, Pamelo Green, Rochelle Davis, Kathy Lawson	44.95	
7	Italy	Paola Bolognesi, Laura Nappi, Maddalena Grassano, Cecilia Molinari	45.79	
