= 1975 Maghreb Athletics Championships =

7th Maghreb Athletics Championships
- Host city: Tunis, Tunisia
- Events: 37
- Participation: 3 nations

The 1975 Maghreb Athletics Championships was the seventh edition of the international athletics competition between the countries of the Maghreb. Algeria, Tunisia and Morocco were the competing nations. Organised by the Union des Fédérations d'Athlétisme du Maghreb Uni (Union of Athletics Federations of the United Maghreb), it took place in Tunis, Tunisia. A total of 37 athletics events were contested, 22 for men and 15 for women.

The tournament was closely contested between the three international teams, as Morocco narrowly won with thirteen gold medals to Algeria and Tunisia's twelve each. It was the second time that the Tunisian capital had hosted the tournament, becoming the first city to hold the event on multiple occasions. Track events were only officially timed to the tenth of a second. It was the final time that the women's pentathlon was held at the competition. A women's 3000 metres featured on the programme, which was the first time a long-distance event had been held for female athletes at the championships. The 1975 edition marked the last in the first regular series of Maghreb Championships, as the competition did not return until six years later and never again had a regular schedule.

== Medal summary ==
=== Men ===
Event	Gold		Silver		Bronze	
100 metres	Omar Ghizlat (MAR)	10.7	Toufik Chaouch (ALG)	10.7	Unknown athlete	???
200 metres	Omar Ghizlat (MAR)	21.7	Brahim Amour (ALG)	21.8	Unknown athlete	???
400 metres	Mohamed Sid Ali Djouadi (ALG)	48.2	Salah Fettouh (MAR)	48.6	Unknown athlete	???
800 metres	Mohamed Sid Ali Djouadi (ALG)	1:50.3	Amar Brahmia (ALG)	1:51.1	Mansour Guettaya (TUN)	1:52.1
1500 metres	Kamel Guemmar (ALG)	3:50.4	Mansour Guettaya (TUN)	3:50.9	Abdelkrim Jelassi (TUN)	3:51.5
5000 metres	Jadour Haddou (MAR)	13:58.2	Abdelkader Zaddem (TUN)	14:01.2	Chérif Benali (ALG)	14:20.8
10,000 metres	Abdelkader Zaddem (TUN)	29:10.6	Boualem Rahoui (ALG)	29:24.0	Houcine El Mekni (TUN)	29:47.2
110 m hurdles	Hassan Filahi (MAR)	15.1	Abdelkader Boudjemaa (ALG)	15.2	Unknown athlete	???
400 m hurdles	Abdallah Rouine (TUN)	53.5	Abdelmoula Aziz (MAR)	53.6	Unknown athlete	???
3000 metres steeplechase	Boualem Rahoui (ALG)	8:41.0	Djelloul Rezig (ALG)	8:47.0	Mohamed Benbaraka (MAR)	8:52.6
4 × 100 m relay	Algeria (ALG)	41.6	Morocco (MAR)	41.9	Unknown	???
4 × 400 m relay	Morocco (MAR)	3:18.1	Algeria (ALG)	3:18.7	Unknown	???
20 km walk	Habib Antar (TUN)	1:42:01	Mohamed Meskari (ALG)	1:44:48	Unknown athlete	???
High jump	Smaini (MAR)	1.95 m	Unknown athlete	??? m	Unknown athlete	??? m
Pole vault	Ahmed Rezki (ALG)	4.20 m	Mohamed Bensaad (ALG)	4.00 m	Unknown athlete	???
Long jump	Ali Ajmi (TUN)	6.86 m	Unknown athlete	???	Unknown athlete	???
Triple jump	Ali Ajmi (TUN)	15.46 m	Saïd Saad (ALG)	14.96 m	Slim Kilani (TUN)	14.74 m
Shot put	Jean-Marie Djebaili (ALG)	17.97 m	Abderrazak Ben Hassine (TUN)	15.10 m	Mohamed Bahri (TUN)	14.42 m
Discus throw	Jean-Marie Djebaili (ALG)	50.36 m	Abderrazak Ben Hassine (TUN)	48.40 m	Abdeljaouad Bedira (TUN)	45.88 m
Hammer throw	Noureddine Bendifallah (ALG)	48.56 m	Jacques Zazoui (ALG)	45.12 m	Unknown athlete	??? m
Javelin throw	Ali Memmi (TUN)	67.34 m	Tarek Chaabani (TUN)	66.94 m	Mohamed Karakhi (MAR)	63.68 m
Decathlon	Mohamed Bensaad (ALG)	6973 pts	Fawzi Joulak (TUN)	6411 pts	Alain Smaïl (ALG)	6160 pts

=== Women ===
Event	Gold		Silver		Bronze	
100 metres	Skikra (MAR)	12.5	Fouzia Ramla (ALG)	12.5	Unknown athlete	???
200 metres	Fouzia Ramla (ALG)	25.6	Unknown athlete	???	Unknown athlete	???
400 metres	Sarra Touibi (TUN)	60.1	Unknown athlete	???	Unknown athlete	???
800 metres	Hadhoum Kadiri (MAR)	2:13.8	Latifa Dérouiche (TUN)	2:15.7	Unknown athlete	???
1500 metres	Latifa Dérouiche (TUN)	4:39.0	Hassania Darami (MAR)	4:42.8	Jalila Douira (TUN)	4:45.3
3000 metres	Latifa Dérouiche (TUN)	9:57.4	Hassania Darami (MAR)	10:04.0	Jalila Douira (TUN)	10:06.2
100 m hurdles	Chérifa Meskaoui (MAR)	15.1	Zahra Azaiez (TUN)	15.2	Unknown athlete	???
4 × 100 m relay	Morocco (MAR)	49.0	Algeria (ALG)	49.2	Tunisia (TUN)	50.4
4 × 400 m relay	Morocco (MAR)	3:58.0	Tunisia (TUN)	4:00.9	Algeria (ALG)	4:08.2
High jump	Kawther Akrémi (TUN)	1.58 m	Yamina Bourzama (ALG)	1.55 m	Unknown athlete	??? m
Long jump	Messaouda Ouchérif (ALG)	5.36 m	Fatima El Faquir (MAR)	5.29 m	Unknown athlete	??? m
Shot put	Chérifa Meskaoui (MAR)	12.29 m	Hédia Touati (TUN)	11.78 m	Unknown athlete	??? m
Discus throw	Fathia Jerbi (TUN)	42.58 m	Chérifa Meskaoui (MAR)	37.80 m	Naziha Moulay (ALG)	37.74 m
Javelin throw	Wissem Chennoufi (TUN)	35.52 m	Naziha Moulay (ALG)	33.28 m	Unknown athlete	??? m
Pentathlon	Chérifa Meskaoui (MAR)	3343 pts	Zahra Azaiez (TUN)	3338 pts	Messaouda Ouchérif (ALG)	3124 pts
