= Tracy Smith (runner) =

American distance runner

Personal information
- Born: March 15, 1945 (age 81) Altadena, California, U.S.
- Height: 5 ft 10 in (178 cm)
- Weight: 160 lb (73 kg)

Sport
- Sport: Track, Distance
- Rank: No. 1 U.S. 10,000 meters, 1966, Track & Field News No. 1 U.S. 10,000 meters, 1968, Track & Field News No. 1 U.S. 5,000 meters, 1969, Track & Field News
- College team: Oregon State University
- Club: U.S. Army Track Club, Athletes in Action

Achievements and titles
- Olympic finals: Representing the United States, 1968 Mexico City, 10,000 meters, 11th Place
- National finals: NCAA Outdoor Track & Field Championships, 3-mile, 6th (1965) NCAA Cross-Country Championships, 6-mile, 2nd (1966) AAU Indoor 3-Mile Champion (1966, 1967, 1973) AAU Outdoor 6-Mile Champion (1966) AAU Outdoor 10,000 Meter Champion (1968) AAU Outdoor 3-Mile Champion (1969)
- Personal best: Mile: 4:03.8 (1967) 1,500 m: 3:43.6 (1972) 2 mi: 8:29.4 (1975) 3,000 m: 7:55 (1968) 3 mi (Indoor): 13:07.2 (1973) 5,000 m: 13:39 (1972) 6 mi: 28:02 (1966) 10,000 m: 28:47 (1968)
Medal record
Bronze, Representing the United States, 1966 International Cross Country Championships, Rabat, Morocco

Tracy Evans Smith (born March 15, 1945, in Altadena, California) is a former American distance runner. He was a member of the 1968 U.S. Olympic Track and Field Team, competing in the 10,000 meters. He was ranked multiple times by Track & Field News as the No. 1 U.S. 5,000- and 10,000-meter runner in the mid- to late 1960s, and was a six-time AAU National Champion from 1966 to 1973, winning outdoors in the 3-mile, 6-mile and 10,000 meters, and three times in the indoor 3-mile. He was a three-time world record holder in the indoor 3-mile.

== High school and college ==
Smith was a champion miler in high school, winning the California State Meet at Edwards Stadium, Berkeley, June 1, 1963, in 4:14.4 for Arcadia High. He was also the nation's fastest prep two-miler that year, ahead of Jim Ryun, with a national-prep-record time of 9:11.6, and was the fourth-fastest miler, nationally, in 1963, with a time of 4:12.6.

On July 4, 1963, University of Oregon track coach Bill Bowerman hosted an all-star high school mile race at Hayward Field, Eugene, OR, that was intended to pit Tracy Smith, the California state champion miler, against Dave Wilborn, Oregon's state champion miler. But the race evolved into a wild duel between Smith and a then relatively unknown 17-year-old miler from Spokane, WA, Gerry Lindgren. Over the final half mile, Smith would repeatedly surge into the lead only to be countered by Lindgren each time. In a sprint to the finish, Smith made a desperate dive, while Lindgren leaned at the tape for a narrow win in 4:12.9. That race marked the beginning of a decade-long duel between two men who would become the best distance runners of their era.

Smith graduated from Arcadia High in 1963 and attended Oregon State University, finishing sixth in the 3-mile at the 1965 NCAA Outdoor Track and Field Championships. The following season, he finished second to rival Lindgren, now of Washington State University, over a six-mile course in 29:11, at the 1966 NCAA Cross Country Championships, at Lawrence, KS, Nov. 21, 1966. He would withdraw from Oregon St. after the fall cross-country season because he found the coaches’ training regimen stifling. He would later earn his degree in 1973 from Long Beach State University, where he briefly coached the men's cross-country team.

Smith burst onto the international running scene March 20, 1966, becoming the first American to ever medal in the International Cross Country Championships, finishing third that year on the 7.5-mile course at Rabat, Morocco, with a time of 36:32.2, behind gold medalist Ben Assou El Ghazi of Morocco and silver medalist Derek Graham of Ireland.

== World records and AAU Championships ==
Smith was a three-time world record holder in the indoor 3-mile, first breaking the mark at the AAU Indoor Championships March 4, 1967, Oakland, CA, with a time of 13:16.2. He bettered his own indoor 3-mile world record, turning in a time of 13:15, March 1, 1968, at the Maple Leaf Games, Toronto. On Feb. 24, 1973, Smith, having come back from what many thought was a career-ending Achilles injury, and what he has often described as the highlight of his running career, thrilled a crowd of over 15,000 to once again break the world indoor 3-mile record at the AAU Indoor Championships at New York's Madison Square Garden in a time of 13:07.2.

Smith was the AAU Indoor Track and Field Champion in the 3-mile in 1966, 1967 and 1973. He was the AAU Outdoor Track and Field Champion in the 6-mile in 1966, the 10,000-meters in 1968, and the 3-mile in 1969. He was the Track & Field News No. 1-ranked U.S. 5,000-meter runner in 1969, and its No.1-ranked U.S. 10,000-meter runner in 1966 and 1968.

== Olympics ==
On June 30, 1968, Smith ran the 10,000 meters at the U.S. Olympic Trials prior to the Mexico City Games. In order to simulate the altitude of Mexico City, the 1968 Trials were held on a temporary, synthetic Tartan track, one of the first ever installed, amid granite boulders and 100-foot-high ponderosa pines (even in the track's infield) at Echo Summit, CA, in the Sierra Nevada, south of Lake Tahoe. At an altitude of 7,377 feet—nearly a mile-and-a-half high and 28-feet higher than the upcoming Mexico City Olympic venue—the 1968 Trials were the highest-altitude, world-class track meet ever staged in the U.S. The thin oxygen at such an altitude presented significant problems for the Olympic hopefuls, especially distance runners in the 10,000-meter race. Smith ran most of the race in the lead, trying to press the pace. He faded badly, however, with just over a lap remaining before gathering himself for a sprint over the final 200 meters to win, notably, over 1964 Tokyo Olympics 10,000-meter gold medalist Billy Mills in a time of 30:00.4. Smith would go on to finish 11th in the 1968 Olympics with a time of 30:14.6.

Smith, in a bid to make his second U.S. Olympic team, competed in the 5,000 meters on July 9, 1972, at the U.S. Olympic Trials, at the University of Oregon's Hayward Field in Eugene. Smith challenged hometown favorite Steve Prefontaine for most of the race until Prefontaine pulled away in dramatic fashion, setting an American record that would stand for 40 years with a time of 13:22.8. Smith finished fifth with a time of 13:44.8, failing by four seconds to qualify for his second Olympics.

== International Track Association ==
From 1974 until its demise in 1976, Smith was a founding member of the upstart International Track Association, an organization that attempted to introduce professionalism to the sport by paying its athletes to compete in a series of track and field meets in a format similar to professional golf and tennis. This flew in the face of the AAU and the International Olympic Committee, which greeted the ITA with outright hostility, clinging to the timeworn Olympic credo that track and field athletes should be unpaid amateurs. The AAU immediately banned all ITA athletes and officials from participating in AAU-sanctioned meets. Likewise, ITA athletes received lifetime bans from Olympic participation. The AAU also pressured television networks from broadcasting ITA events. In addition to Smith, a number of world-class track and field stars had joined the ITA, including Bob Seagren, Lee Evans, Jim Ryun, Brian Oldfield, Kip Keino, Ben Jipcho and Marty Liquori. The ITA managed to stage over 51 meets during its existence, but its demise came shortly after the 1976 Montreal Olympics when most track and field athletes, intimidated by the AAU and the IOC, shied away from the ITA for fear of hurting their amateur status.

== High school coaching ==
Smith retired from international racing in the mid-'70s and settled in Bishop, CA, where he taught school and was an assistant track coach in charge of the boys and girls distance runners at Bishop Union High School. He helped mold the Bishop track teams into a regional powerhouse that won several team and individual Desert-Inyo League and CIF Southern Section Championships. Smith, a disciple of his 1968 Olympic coach Mihály Iglói, was an advocate of the intense interval-style training method that Iglói had introduced to the track world in the ‘60s, and deployed these methods with great success to train his high school runners.

In 1994, he moved his family to Bend, OR, where he served as head coach of the Crook County High School (Prineville, OR) cross country and track teams, as well as a special education teacher. In 2017, he coached the Crook County High School boys cross-country team to the 4A state championship, the school’s first such title in 41 years. Smith was ecstatic for his runners after the team’s win, telling The Bulletin (Bend, OR), “Oh, my gosh. What a great feeling. I haven’t had a feeling like this since running in my younger days. I had a pretty good feeling with individual titles every now and then, but whoa. This is amazing.”

Smith has since retired, but has continued his lifelong love of running.
