= Tennis at the 1971 Mediterranean Games =

- Dates: 6–17 October 1971

The tennis competitions at the 1971 Mediterranean Games took place in İzmir.Athletes competed in 2 events. Tennis was one of several sports during the sixth Mediterranean Games held in Izmir in Turkey in the period 6 to 17 October 1971. It was the third time that tennis was on the program during the Mediterranean Games. There was a men's singles and doubles tournament.

== Medal table ==
* Host nation (Turkey)

Rank	Nation	Gold	Silver	Bronze	Total
1	Spain	1	2	0	3
2	Italy	1	0	0	1
3	Greece	0	0	1	1
Totals (3 entries)		2	2	1	5

== Medalists ==
Event	Gold	Silver	Bronze
Men's singles	Manuel Orantes; Spain	Juan Gisbert; Spain	Nicholas Kalogeropoulos; Greece
Men's doubles	Adriano Panatta; Antonio Zugarelli; Italy	Antonio Muñoz; José Guerrero; Spain	Adriano Panatta; Antonio Zugarelli; Spain
