= 1966 International Cross Country Championships =

- Organisers: ICCU
- Edition: 53rd
- Date: March 20
- Host city: Rabat, Morocco
- Venue: Souissi Racecourse
- Events: 2
- Distances: 7.5 mi (12.1 km) men 4.35 mi (7.0 km) junior men
- Participation: 134 athletes from 15 nations

The 1966 International Cross Country Championships was held in Rabat, Morocco, at the Souissi Racecourse on March 20, 1966. A report on the event was given in the Glasgow Herald.

Complete results for men, junior men, medallists, and the results of British athletes were published.

== Medallists ==
Event	Gold		Silver		Bronze	
Individual
Men; 7.5 mi (12.1 km)	Ben Assou El Ghazi; Morocco	36:22.1	Derek Graham; Ireland	36:29.6	Tracy Smith; United States	36:32.2
Junior Men; 4.35 mi (7.0 km)	Mike Tagg; England	21:26.4	Roy Young; England	21:35.3	Eddie Knox; Scotland	21:40.6
Team
Men	England	59	France	79	Morocco	184
Junior Men	England	8	Belgium	21	Scotland	28

== Individual Race Results ==
=== Men's (7.5 mi / 12.1 km) ===
Rank	Athlete	Nationality	Time
1st place, gold medalist(s)	Ben Assou El Ghazi	Morocco	36:22.1
2nd place, silver medalist(s)	Derek Graham	Ireland	36:29.6
3rd place, bronze medalist(s)	Tracy Smith	United States	36:32.2
4	Roy Fowler	England	36:41
5	Michel Jazy	France	36:50
6	Ron Hill	England	36:52
7	Tim Johnston	England	36:54
8	Mike Freary	England	36:55
9	Ahmed Zammel	Tunisia	36:55
10	Guy Texereau	France	37:04
11	Noel Tijou	France	37:04
12	Lachie Stewart	Scotland	37:11
13	Bernard Maroquin	France	37:14
14	Ian McCafferty	Scotland	37:20
15	Tim Briault	England	37:24
16	Jim Alder	Scotland	37:27
17	Guy Caillet	France	37:28
18	Ali Khamassi	Tunisia	37:28
19	Gerry North	England	37:30
20	Antonio Ambu	Italy	37:31
21	Gottfried Arnold	West Germany	37:40
22	Ahmed Oukbouch	Morocco	37:44
23	Yves Martinage	France	37:47
24	Michel Bernard	France	37:51
25	Hedi Hamrouni	Tunisia	37:52
26	Doug Brown	United States	37:55
27	Mohamed Bensaid	Morocco	37:55
28	François Lacour	France	37:55
29	Chris Loosley	Wales	38:02
30	Henri Clerckx	Belgium	38:03
31	Hans Gerlach	West Germany	38:08
32	Werner Dössegger	Switzerland	38:11
33	Eamon O'Reilly	United States	38:12
34	John Linaker	Scotland	38:13
35	Labidi Ayachi	Tunisia	
36	Hans-Joachim Liess	West Germany	
37	John Hillen	England	
38	Tom Bache	United States	
39	John Hammond	England	
40	Tom O'Riordan	Ireland	
41	Hammadi Ben Mohamed	Morocco	
42	Leon Moreels	Belgium	
43	Mhedheb Hannachi	Tunisia	
44	Michael Kimball	United States	
45	Luigi Conti	Italy	
46	Mohamed Said	Morocco	
47	Moha Ouali	Morocco	
48	Andy Brown	Scotland	
49	Jim McNamara	Ireland	
50	Herb Lorenz	United States	
51	Albien van Holsbeek	Belgium	
52	Cyrille van Geert	Belgium	
53	Allal Ben Saoudi	Morocco	
54	Arno Krausse	West Germany	
55	Denis Jouret	Belgium	
56	Rabah Ben Othman	Tunisia	
57	Oskar Leupi	Switzerland	38:42
58	Hansruedi Knill	Switzerland	38:45
59	Frans van der Hoeven	Belgium	
60	Jean Fayolle	France	
61	Osvaldo Segrada	Italy	
62	Alfons Ida	West Germany	
63	Bruce Mortensen	United States	
64	Abdelkader Zaddem	Tunisia	
65	Peter Kubicki	West Germany	
66	Harry Simpson	Ireland	
67	Roger Robinson	England	
68	Gerry Williams	Wales	
69	Hedydd Davies	Wales	
70	Alberto Bargnani	Italy	
71	Jozef Callens	Belgium	
72	Gioacchino De Palma	Italy	
73	Bouabib Chaoui	Morocco	
74	Hans Rüdisühli	Switzerland	39:27
75	Said Benmaguini	Morocco	
76	Edgar Friedli	Switzerland	39:42
77	Donato D'Agostino	Italy	
78	James Johnstone	Scotland	
79	Julien Laureyns	Belgium	
80	Rachid Ben Naceur	Tunisia	
81	Walter Dietiker	Switzerland	39:45
82	Tony Murphy	Ireland	
83	Fred Bell	Wales	
84	Roy Mack	Wales	
85	Jean-Pierre Delloye	Belgium	
86	Tony Hopkins	Ireland	
87	Georg Kaiser	Switzerland	40:42
88	Bob Scharf	United States	
89	Tom Edmunds	Wales	
90	Fergus Murray	Scotland	
91	Nick Barton	Wales	
92	J. Evans	Gibraltar	
93	J. Macedo	Gibraltar	
94	A. Ryan	Gibraltar	
95	J. Chappory	Gibraltar	
96	Gomez	Gibraltar	
97	de Torres	Gibraltar	
98	Bucklen	Gibraltar	
—	Renato De Palmas	Italy	DNF

=== Junior Men's (4.35 mi / 7.0 km) ===
Rank	Athlete	Nationality	Time
1st place, gold medalist(s)	Mike Tagg	England	21:26.4
2nd place, silver medalist(s)	Roy Young	England	21:35.3
3rd place, bronze medalist(s)	Eddie Knox	Scotland	21:40.6
4	Eddy Van Butsele	Belgium	21:45
5	David Atkin	England	21:45
6	Jony Dumon	Belgium	21:48
7	John Caine	England	21:49
8	Colin Moxsom	England	21:54
9	Hamdouni Sghaier	Tunisia	22:00
10	Jim Brennan	Scotland	22:09
11	Gaston Heleven	Belgium	22:14
12	Larbi Oukada	Morocco	22:15
13	Belgacem Bammou	Morocco	22:17
14	Mejjati Lahcen	Morocco	22:26
15	Alistair Blamire	Scotland	22:35
16	Francesco Amante	Italy	22:35
17	Roberto Grazzani	Italy	22:42
18	Antonio Giancanterino	Italy	22:46
19	Mohamed Kretif	Morocco	22:46
20	Giuseppe Ardizzone	Italy	22:55
21	Johan Janssens	Belgium	
22	Emiel Puttemans	Belgium	
23	Cherkaoui	Morocco	
24	Hedi Ladjili	Tunisia	
25	Carlos Lopes	Portugal	
26	Gaetano Pusterla	Italy	
27	Hamida Gamoudi	Tunisia	
28	Frank Steel	Scotland	
29	José Lourenço	Portugal	
30	José Rainha	Portugal	
31	Ahmed Hamdouche	Algeria	
32	Mokhtar Djedidi	Tunisia	
33	Kamali Benmissi	Algeria	
34	Omar Lerari	Algeria	
35	Mokhtar Louichi	Algeria	

== Team Results ==
=== Men's ===
Rank	Country	Team	Points
1	England	Roy Fowler; Ron Hill; Tim Johnston; Mike Freary; Tim Briault; Gerry North	59
2	France	Michel Jazy; Guy Texereau; Noel Tijou; Bernard Maroquin; Guy Caillet; Yves Martinage	79
3	Morocco	Ben Assou El Ghazi; Ahmed Oukbouch; Mohamed Bensaid; Hammadi Ben Mohamed; Mohamed Said; Moha Ouali	184
4	Tunisia	Ahmed Zammel; Ali Khamassi; Hedi Hamrouni; Labidi Ayachi; Mhedheb Hannachi; Rabah Ben Othman	186
5	United States	Tracy Smith; Doug Brown; Eamon O'Reilly; Tom Bache; Michael Kimball; Herb Lorenz	194
6	Scotland	Lachie Stewart; Ian McCafferty; Jim Alder; John Linaker; Andy Brown; James Johnstone	202
7	Federal Republic of Germany	Gottfried Arnold; Hans Gerlach; Hans-Joachim Liess; Arno Krausse; Alfons Ida; Peter Kubicki	269
8	Belgium	Henri Clerckx; Leon Moreels; Albien van Holsbeek; Cyrille van Geert; Denis Jouret; Frans van der Hoeven	289
9	Ireland	Derek Graham; Tom O'Riordan; Jim McNamara; Harry Simpson; Tony Murphy; Tony Hopkins	325
10	Italy	Antonio Ambu; Luigi Conti; Osvaldo Segrada; Alberto Bargnani; Gioacchino De Palma; Donato D'Agostino	345
11	Switzerland	Werner Dössegger; Oskar Leupi; Hansruedi Knill; Hans Rüdisühli; Edgar Friedli; Walter Dietiker	378
12	Wales	Chris Loosley; Gerry Williams; Hedydd Davies; Fred Bell; Roy Mack; Tom Edmunds	422
13	Gibraltar	J. Evans; J. Macedo; A. Ryan; J. Chappory; Gomez de Torres	567

=== Junior Men's ===
Rank	Country	Team	Points
1	England	Mike Tagg; Roy Young; David Atkin	8
2	Belgium	Eddy van Butsele; Johnny Dumon; Gaston Heleven	21
3	Scotland	Eddie Knox; Jim Brennan; Alistair Blamire	28
4	Morocco	Larbi Oukada; Belgacem Bammou; Mejjati Lahcen	39
5	Italy	Francesco Amante; Roberto Grazzani; Antonio Giancanterino	51
6	Tunisia	Hamdouni Sghaier; Hedi Ladjili; Hamida Gamoudi	60
7	Portugal	Carlos Lopes; José Lourenço; José Rainha	84
8	Algeria	Ahmed Hamdouche; Kamali Benmissi; Omar Lerari	98

== Participation ==
An unofficial count yields the participation of 134 athletes from 15 countries.

- Algeria (4)
- Belgium (14)
- England (14)
- France (9)
- Gibraltar (7)
- Ireland (6)
- Italy (12)
- Morocco (14)
- Portugal (3)
- Scotland (11)
- Switzerland (7)
- Tunisia (12)
- United States (8)
- Wales (7)
- West Germany (6)

== See also ==
- 1966 in athletics (track and field)
