= Giovanardi =

Giovanardi is an Italian surname. Notable people with the surname include:

- Carlo Giovanardi (born 1950), Italian politician
- Daniele Giovanardi (born 1950), Italian former sprinter
- Fabrizio Giovanardi (born 1966), Italian racing driver
