= Salah Fettouh =

Moroccan sprinter

Personal information
- Nationality: Moroccan
- Born: 5 May 1948 (age 78)

Sport
- Sport: Sprinting
- Event: 4 × 400 metres relay
Medal record
Men's athletics
Representing Morocco
Mediterranean Games
Bronze medal – third place	1971 İzmir	4 × 400 m relay
Maghreb Championships
Silver medal – second place	1975 Tunis	400 m

Salah Fettouh (born 5 May 1948) is a Moroccan sprinter. He competed in the men's 4 × 400 metres relay at the 1972 Summer Olympics.

Fettouh won multiple international medals in the 1970s. He ran the third leg on Morocco's bronze-medal-winning 4 × 400 m relay team at the 1971 Mediterranean Games. Four years later at the 1975 Maghreb Athletics Championships, Fettouh won silver in the individual 400 metres.
