= Ben Assou El Ghazi =

Moroccan long-distance runner

Medal record

Men's athletics

Representing Morocco

International Cross Country Championships
Gold medal – first place	1966 Rabat	Senior race
Bronze medal – third place	1964 Dublin	Senior team
Bronze medal – third place	1966 Rabat	Senior team

Ben Assou El Ghazi (Arabic: بن أسو الغازي; born 1938) is a Moroccan long-distance runner who competed in track and cross country running events. He represented his country in the 3000 metres steeplechase at the 1964 Summer Olympics. He was the winner of the 1966 International Cross Country Championships – the second African to do so after Rhadi Ben Abdesselam. He also led the Moroccan team to African's first team medal at the tournament. He won two gold medals on the track at the 1965 Pan Arab Games.

== Career ==
El Ghazi first emerged as an international athlete at the 1964 International Cross Country Championships, where he ran in the Moroccan team and helped them (alongside Abdeslem Bouchta) to finish third in the rankings through his 17th-place finish. Though fellow Moroccan Rhadi Ben Abdesselam had won the race four years earlier, this represented the first time that a non-European nation had reached the team podium in the international cross country competition. El Ghazi's Olympic debut followed later that year and at the 1964 Tokyo Olympics he placed ninth in the final of the steeplechase. He was Morocco's top performer at the 1965 International Cross Country Championships, but in 38th place he had fallen down the rankings. Greater recognition came a t the 1965 Pan Arab Games, however, where he won a gold medal double in the 5000 metres and the steeplechase (setting a games record in the latter event. This extended Moroccan dominance in the events, as his countrymen Saïd Gerouani Benmoha and Abdeslem Bouchta were the previous champions.

The 1966 season proved to be the greatest of El Ghazi's career. Based in Rabat, he had been given six months off from work in order to train for the upcoming cross country championships. First came a victory at the World Military Cross Country Championships, taking the title from Tunisian Mohammed Gammoudi Gammoudi was absent from the 1966 International Cross Country Championships and defending champion Jean Fayolle was not in the running. El Ghazi crossed the line some seven seconds ahead of the next competitor Derek Graham of Ireland. This made him only the second African to win the title, after Rhadi Ben Abdesselam, and he led the team to the continent's second team medal in the race with the help of Ahmed Oukbouch. His win highlighted the increasingly global nature of the competition during this period.

His career declined shortly after but he made three more appearances at the International Cross Country Championships. Absent for the 1967 race, he returned in 1968 and placed 24th, with Mohamed Said and Larbi Oukada taking up the role of Morocco's top runners. The Moroccan team also suffered a decline alongside that of El Ghazi: their men took fifth in 1968, seventh at the 1969 race (where El Ghazi was 28th) and then sixth in the 1971 race, where El Ghazi finished 49th in his last appearance. No Moroccan reached the top fifteen in this period. A revival occurred in 1972 when four men achieved that feat to bring Morocco to second – the best placing of an African team in the competition's history.

The final highlight of El Ghazi's career came in the steeplechase: he completed a Moroccan 1–2 as a silver medallist behind Miloud Chenna at the 1971 Maghreb Athletics Championships.

== International competitions ==
Year	Competition	Venue	Position	Event	Notes
1964	International Cross Country Championships	Dublin, Ireland	17th	Senior race	41:39
1964	International Cross Country Championships	Dublin, Ireland	3rd	Senior team	149 pts
1964	Olympic Games	Tokyo, Japan	9th	3000 m s'chase	8:43.6
1965	International Cross Country Championships	Ostend, Belgium	38th	Senior race	38:21
1965	International Cross Country Championships	Ostend, Belgium	8th	Senior team	330 pts
1965	Pan Arab Games	Cairo, Egypt	1st	5000 m	15:02.4
1965	Pan Arab Games	Cairo, Egypt	1st	3000 m s'chase	9:21.0 GR
1966	World Military Cross Country Championships	Diekirch, Luxembourg	1st	Senior race	31:50.0
1966	International Cross Country Championships	Rabat, Morocco	1st	Senior race	36:22.1
1966	International Cross Country Championships	Rabat, Morocco	3rd	Senior team	184 pts
1968	International Cross Country Championships	Tunis, Tunisia	24th	Senior race	36:33
1968	International Cross Country Championships	Tunis, Tunisia	5th	Senior team	178 pts
1969	International Cross Country Championships	Clydebank, Scotland	28th	Senior race	38:17
1969	International Cross Country Championships	Clydebank, Scotland	7th	Senior team	228 pts
1971	International Cross Country Championships	San Sebastián, Spain	49th	Senior race	40:59
1971	International Cross Country Championships	San Sebastián, Spain	6th	Senior team	215 pts
1971	Maghreb Athletics Championships	Casablanca, Morocco	2nd	3000 m s'chase	8:56.8
