= Kocuvan =

Kocuvan, less commonly Koczuván, is a surname. Notable people with the surname include:

- Miro Kocuvan (born 1971), Slovene hurdler
- Miro Kocuvan (athlete, born 1947), Yugoslav sprinter
