= Vecchiato =

Vecchiato is an Italian surname. Notable people with the surname include:

- Mario Vecchiato (born 1948), Italian hammer thrower
- Renzo Vecchiato (born 1955), Italian basketball player
