= Mohamed Asswai Khalifa =

Libyan hurdler (1944–2018)

Personal information
- Native name: محمد الصويعي خليفة
- Born: 1944 Zawiya, Libya
- Died: 2018 (aged 73–74)
- Height: 180 cm (5 ft 11 in)
- Weight: 70 kg (154 lb)

Sport
- Country: Libyan
- Sport: Track and field
- Event: 400 metres hurdles
Medal record
Men's athletics
Representing Libya
Maghreb Championships
| Gold medal – first place | 1969 Tripoli | 400 m hurdles |

Mohamed Souai Asswai Khalifa (Arabic: محمد الصويعي خليفة; 1944 – 2018) was a Libyan athlete and footballer. He was the first ever person to represent Libya at the Olympics, competing in the men's 400 metres hurdles at the 1968 Summer Olympics.

== Biography ==
Asswai was born in 1944 in Zawiya, Libya. He played football and competed in athletics. He was a leading figure with Al Ahli SC in the 1960s and played for them as a midfielder from 1965 to 1970, contributing to their Libyan Premier League championship in the 1968–69 season.

Asswai was selected to compete at the 1968 Summer Olympics in Mexico, being Libya's first-ever Olympian. Selected for the 400 m hurdles, he was seeded in the first heat at the 1968 Olympics. He ran 54.34 seconds to place 8th, failing to advance to the semi-finals. He also competed at the 1967 Maghreb Athletics Championships and two years later, won the gold medal in the 400 m hurdles at the 1969 Maghreb Athletics Championships with a time of 53.1 seconds, a personal best. He was a participant at the 1967 Mediterranean Games and the 1971 Mediterranean Games.

A member of the Military Union, Asswai won many national championships and other tournaments in Libya. In 1973, he won both the national long jump and triple jump championships. Afterwards, he was a coach and administrator for his club and with the Libyan national athletics teams. He was described as a "Libyan sports icon and hero", as well as one of the country's "most prominent Olympic heroes". Al Wasat described him as "a model of the ideal coach who loved his game, and contributed to preparing and refining many talents and competitors who supported the ranks of the Libyan national teams in their foreign participations".

Asswai was bedridden in his last years from an illness and died in 2018.
