= Guendalina Buffon =

Italian volleyball player (born 1973)

Personal information
- Born: 14 May 1973 (age 53); Carrara, Italy

Career
Years	Teams
1991–1993; 1993–1995; 1995–1999; 1999–2000; 2000–2001	Sirio Perugia; Amazzoni Agrigento; PVF Matera; Figurella Firenze; Robursport Pesaro

National team
1994	Italy

Guendalina Buffon (born 14 May 1973) is an Italian retired volleyball player. She was part of the Italy women's national volleyball team.

She participated in the 1994 FIVB Volleyball Women's World Championship.

== Personal life ==
Guendalina was born into a family of Italian athletes: her mother Maria Stella Masocco was a discus thrower, and her father Adriano was a weightlifter. Following their athletic retirement, they subsequently worked as P.E. school teachers.

Guendalina's sister Veronica Buffon also played volleyball for the Italian national team; their younger brother Gianluigi is a former professional football goalkeeper who played for the Italy national football team for two decades and won the 2006 FIFA World Cup.
