= Georgios Georgiadis (athlete) =

Greek hammer thrower

Georgios Georgiadis (born 20 May 1948 in Thessaloniki) is a Greek former hammer thrower who competed in the 1972 Summer Olympics.

He was also the champion at the 1971 Mediterranean Games.
