= Azzedine Azzouzi =

Algerian middle-distance runner

Personal information
- Born: 20 September 1947 (age 78)

Sport
- Sport: Track and field
Medal record
Representing Algeria
Mediterranean Games
Bronze medal – third place	1971 Izmir	800m

Mohamed Azzedine Azzouzi (born 20 September 1947) is an Algerian former middle-distance runner. He represented his nation in the 800 metres and 1500 metres at the 1972 Summer Olympic Games. He won a bronze medal at the 1971 Mediterranean Games in the 800 metres.

Olympic Games
Preceded by Mohamed Lazhari	Flagbearer for Algeria; 1972 Munich	Succeeded by Djamel Yahiouche
