= Athletics at the 1966 British Empire and Commonwealth Games – Men's 3 miles =

Men's 3 miles at the 1966 British Empire and Commonwealth Games
- Venue: Independence Park, Kingston
- Dates: August 8, 1966

Medalists
gold medal	Kip Keino	Kenya
silver medal	Ron Clarke	Australia
bronze medal	Allan Rushmer	England

The men's 3 miles event at the 1966 British Empire and Commonwealth Games was held on 8 August at the Independence Park in Kingston, Jamaica. It was the last time that the imperial distance was contested at the Games later being replaced by the 5000 metres.

== Results ==
Results: GR means Games Record
Rank	Name	Nationality	Time	Notes
1st place, gold medalist(s)	Kip Keino	Kenya	12:57.4	GR
2nd place, silver medalist(s)	Ron Clarke	Australia	12:59.2	
3rd place, bronze medalist(s)	Allan Rushmer	England	13:08.6	
4	Nabiba Temu	Kenya	13:10.4	
5	Ian McCafferty	Scotland	13:12.2	
6	Dick Taylor	England	13:12.4	
7	Bill Wilkinson	England	13:15.4	
8	Derek Graham	Northern Ireland	13:17.8	
9	Arthur Pyne	New Zealand	13:18.6	
10	Ian Studd	New Zealand	13:25.8	
11	Christantus Nyakwoyo	Kenya	13:31.0	
12	Joseph Stewart	Scotland	13:40.0	
13	Benjamin Kogo	Kenya	13:42.2	
14	Bruce Tulloh	England	13:46.4	
15	Pascal Mfyomi	Tanzania	13:48.2	
16	Ian Blackwood	Australia	13:51.6	
17	Fergus Murray	Scotland	14:32.4	
18	George Kerr	Jamaica	14:37.2	
19	Dilbagh Singh Kler	Malaysia	14:54.8	
20	John Mowatt	Jamaica	15:04.8	
21	Allieu Massaquoi	Sierra Leone	15:22.0	
	Kerry O'Brien	Australia	DNF	
	Robert Lightburn	British Honduras	DNF	
	Vinton Powell	Jamaica	DNF	
	Mohamed Ismail	Aden	DNF	
	Bill Baillie	New Zealand	DNS	
