= Apostolos Kathiniotis =

Greek triple jumper (born 1952)

Apostolos Kathiniotis (Greek: Απόστολος Καθηνιώτης, born 16 March 1952) is a retired Greek triple jumper.

He was born in Volos and represented the club GS Volou. He won the silver medal at the 1971 Mediterranean Games, and the gold medal at the 1973 and 1974 Balkan Games, finished ninth at the 1974 European Indoor Championships and tenth at the 1974 European Championships. He competed at the 1976 Olympic Games without reaching the final.

His personal best jump was 16.61 metres, achieved in 1976.
