= Umberto Risi =

Italian steeplechase runner

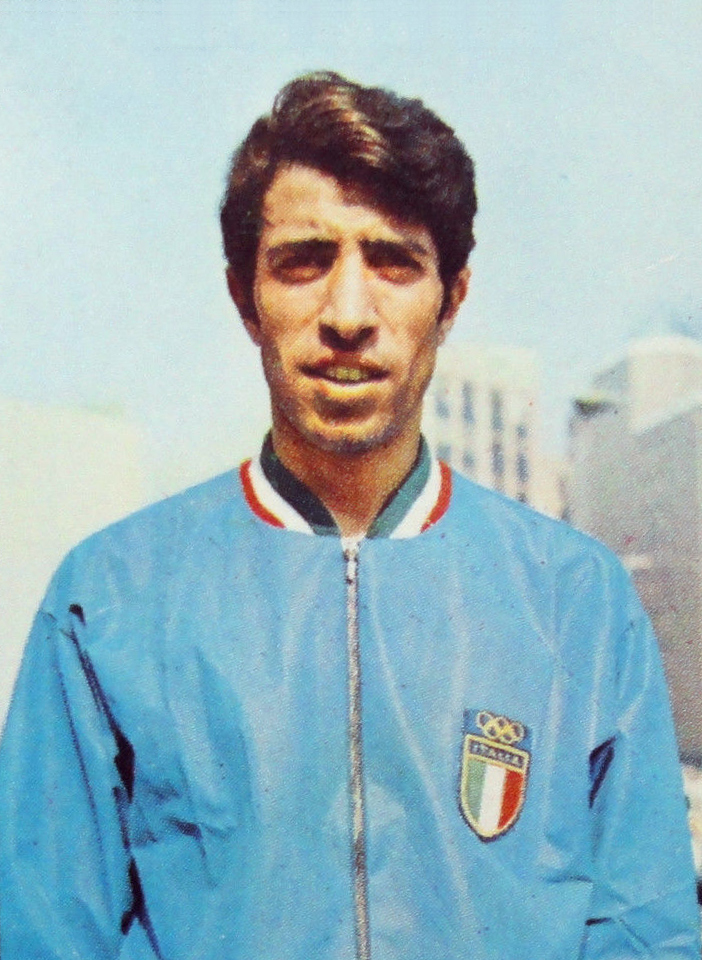

Personal information
- Born: 31 December 1940 (age 85) Rome, Italy
- Height: 1.74 m (5 ft 9 in)
- Weight: 64 kg (141 lb)

Sport
- Sport: Athletics
- Event: 3000 m steeplechase
- Club: CUS Roma

Achievements and titles
- Personal best: 8:33.8 (1970)
Medal record
Representing Italy
Mediterranean Games
Bronze medal – third place	1971 Izmir	3000 m steeplechase

Umberto Risi (born 31 December 1940) is a retired Italian steeplechase runner. He competed at the 1968 Summer Olympics but failed to reach the final. Risi won a bronze medal at the 1971 Mediterranean Games. His personal best for the steeplechase was 8:33.8 minutes, set in 1970.

== Biography ==
Risi ran for Italy at the 1970 International Cross Country Championships but failed to finish. He was later selected for the 1973 IAAF World Cross Country Championships, but again did not finish. He was twice a competitor at the European Athletics Championships (1969 and 1971), but did not progress beyond the steeplechase heats of either competition.

He was a two-time Italian national champion in the steeplechase, winning in 1969 and 1970.
