= Mohamed Sid Ali Djouadi =

Algerian athletics competitor

Personal information
- Born: 13 December 1951 (age 74)

Sport
- Sport: Track and field
Medal record
Representing Algeria
Mediterranean Games
| Silver medal – second place | 1975 Algiers | 800m |
All-Africa Games
| Bronze medal – third place | 1973 Lagos | 800m |
Summer Universiade
| Bronze medal – third place | 1975 Rome | 800m |

Mohamed Sid Ali Djouadi (born 13 December 1951) represented Algeria in the 800 m at the 1972 Summer Olympic Games he finished 5th in his heat and failed to advance. He later went on to win gold medals at the 1973 Maghreb Athletics Championships and the 1975 Maghreb Athletics Championships.
