= Athletics at the 1965 Arab Games =

Athletics at the 1965 Pan Arab Games

1965 Pan Arab Games

- Egypt, Cairo
- September 2–14

== MEN ==
=== 100m ===
| MEDAL | ATHLETE | DOB | COUNTRY | MARK | W/I | RECORD | NOTES |
|---|---|---|---|---|---|---|---|
| | Mohamed Ahmed El Guindi | | EGY | 10.9 | | | |
| | . El Chabikilky | | IRQ | 10.9 | | | |
| | Jootje Pesak Oroh | | INA | 10.9 | | | |

=== 200m ===
| MEDAL | ATHLETE | DOB | COUNTRY | MARK | W/I | RECORD | NOTES |
|---|---|---|---|---|---|---|---|
| | Mohamed Rihan | | EGY | 22.1 | | | |
| | Falih Fahmi | 1940 | IRQ | 22.2 | | | |
| | Abdel Nabi El Moghazi | | EGY | 22.5 | | | |

=== 400m ===
| MEDAL | ATHLETE | DOB | COUNTRY | MARK | W/I | RECORD | NOTES |
|---|---|---|---|---|---|---|---|
| | Mohamed El Sayed (II) | | EGY | 49.2 | | CR | |
| | . Bahloul | | EGY | 49.6 | | | |
| | . Somisry | | INA | 49.6 | | | |

=== 800m ===
| MEDAL | ATHLETE | DOB | COUNTRY | MARK | W/I | RECORD | NOTES |
|---|---|---|---|---|---|---|---|
| | Mohamed Abdel Rahman | | EGY | 1:52.3 | | CR | |
| | Ahmed El Naggar | | EGY | 1:54.1 | | | |
| | Siraj Khalifa | | MAR | 1:54.6 | | | |

=== 1500m ===
| MEDAL | ATHLETE | DOB | COUNTRY | MARK | W/I | RECORD | NOTES |
|---|---|---|---|---|---|---|---|
| | Ahmed El Naggar | | EGY | 4:05.5 | | | |
| | . Maghar | | LBN | 4:05.8 | | | |
| | Khalifa Oteich | | SYR | 4:06.2 | | | |

=== 5000m ===
| MEDAL | ATHLETE | DOB | COUNTRY | MARK | W/I | RECORD | NOTES |
|---|---|---|---|---|---|---|---|
| | Benassou El Ghazi | 1938 | MAR | 15:02.4 | | | |
| | Said Gerouani Benmoha | 1934 | MAR | 15:02.6 | | | |
| | Ahmed Oukbouche | 1945 | MAR | 15:03.2 | | | |

=== 10,000m ===
| MEDAL | ATHLETE | DOB | COUNTRY | MARK | W/I | RECORD | NOTES |
|---|---|---|---|---|---|---|---|
| | Said Gerouani Benmoha | 1934 | MAR | 30:58.0 | | CR | |
| | Ahmed Oukbouche | 1945 | MAR | 31:18.8 | | | |
| | Atta Khalifa | | EGY | 32:20.0 | | | |

=== Marathon ===
| MEDAL | ATHLETE | DOB | COUNTRY | MARK | W/I | RECORD | NOTES |
|---|---|---|---|---|---|---|---|
| | Allal Benlahcen | | MAR | 2:53:24 | | | |
| | . Osman | | EGY | 2:55:08 | | | |
| | . Ismail | | SUD | 2:59:29 | | | |

=== 3000SC ===
| MEDAL | ATHLETE | DOB | COUNTRY | MARK | W/I | RECORD | NOTES |
|---|---|---|---|---|---|---|---|
| | Benassou El Ghazi | 1938 | MAR | 9:21.0 | | CR | |
| | Nicky Pattiasina | | INA | 9:52.6 | | | |
| | Ahmed El Naggar | | EGY | 10:10.6 | | | |

=== 110H ===
| MEDAL | ATHLETE | DOB | COUNTRY | MARK | W/I | RECORD | NOTES |
|---|---|---|---|---|---|---|---|
| | Abdel Nabi El Moghazi | | EGY | 15.1 | | | |
| | Abdel Reda | | IRQ | 15.2 | | | |
| | Abdel Gabbar | | EGY | 15.2 | | | |

=== 400H ===
| MEDAL | ATHLETE | DOB | COUNTRY | MARK | W/I | RECORD | NOTES |
|---|---|---|---|---|---|---|---|
| | Abdel Gabbar | | EGY | 55.0 | | | |
| | . Kassem | | IRQ | 55.7 | | | |
| | . Abubaker | | LBN | 57.0 | | | |

=== HJ ===
| MEDAL | ATHLETE | DOB | COUNTRY | MARK | W/I | RECORD | NOTES |
|---|---|---|---|---|---|---|---|
| | M Magoun | | SUD | 1.85 | | | |
| | . El Kharki | | IRQ | 1.85 | | | |
| | . Kamal | | IRQ | 1.85 | | | |

=== PV ===
| MEDAL | ATHLETE | DOB | COUNTRY | MARK | W/I | RECORD | NOTES |
|---|---|---|---|---|---|---|---|
| | Mohammed Abdullah | 1935 | IRQ | 4.20 | | CR | |
| | Mohamed Alaa Ghita (1945) | | EGY | 4.00 | | | |
| | Mohammed Abbas Al-Hadidi | | EGY | 3.80 | | | |

=== LJ ===
| MEDAL | ATHLETE | DOB | COUNTRY | MARK | W/I | RECORD | NOTES |
|---|---|---|---|---|---|---|---|
| | Ezzedin Yacoub Hamed | 1943 | EGY | 7.01 | | | |
| | Shaman Sahloul | | SYR | 6.87 | | | |
| | Hosni El Hamy | | EGY | 6.86 | | | |

=== TJ ===
| MEDAL | ATHLETE | DOB | COUNTRY | MARK | W/I | RECORD | NOTES |
|---|---|---|---|---|---|---|---|
| | Mohamed El Sayed Abdel Aziz | | EGY | 13.90 | | | |
| | Abdul Sattar Al-Razzak | 1932 | IRQ | 13.83 | | | |
| | . Abdulrahim | | IRQ | 13.58 | | | |

=== SP ===
| MEDAL | ATHLETE | DOB | COUNTRY | MARK | W/I | RECORD | NOTES |
|---|---|---|---|---|---|---|---|
| | Hassan Mahrous (1940) | | EGY | 15.06 | | CR | |
| | . Haddad | | IRQ | 15.01 | | | |
| | Shebel Hassan Farag | | EGY | 14.77 | | | |

=== DT ===
| MEDAL | ATHLETE | DOB | COUNTRY | MARK | W/I | RECORD | NOTES |
|---|---|---|---|---|---|---|---|
| | Nayef Mohammed Hamid | 1929 | IRQ | 47.79 | | CR | |
| | Shebel Hassan Farag | | EGY | 46.41 | | | |
| | Farouk Ali El Hennawi | | EGY | 43.73 | | | |

=== HT ===
| MEDAL | ATHLETE | DOB | COUNTRY | MARK | W/I | RECORD | NOTES |
|---|---|---|---|---|---|---|---|
| | Merouane Bitar | | SYR | 48.37 | | CR | |
| | Saleh Zaky | | IRQ | 44.31 | | | |
| | Rameh Kheireddine | | LBN | 39.38 | | | |

=== JT ===
| MEDAL | ATHLETE | DOB | COUNTRY | MARK | W/I | RECORD | NOTES |
|---|---|---|---|---|---|---|---|
| | Mohamed Mahmoud | | EGY | 58.81 | | | |
| | Mohammed Ramzy | | EGY | 54.92 | | | |
| | Abdelaziz Saleh | | EGY | 54.83 | | | |

=== 20kmW ===
| MEDAL | ATHLETE | DOB | COUNTRY | MARK | W/I | RECORD | NOTES |
|---|---|---|---|---|---|---|---|
| | Abdel Hamed | | EGY | 1:49:43 | | | |

=== 50kmW ===
| MEDAL | ATHLETE | DOB | COUNTRY | MARK | W/I | RECORD | NOTES |
|---|---|---|---|---|---|---|---|
| | Mohamed El Sayed (I) | | EGY | 5:27:47 | | | |

=== Decathlon ===
| MEDAL | ATHLETE | DOB | COUNTRY | MARK | W/I | RECORD | NOTES |
|---|---|---|---|---|---|---|---|
| | Hassan Nassif | | EGY | 6178 | pts | CR | |
| | Mohammed Ramzy | | EGY | 5527 | pts | | |
| | Mohammed Abbas Al-Hadidi | | EGY | 5152 | pts | | |

=== 4x100m ===
| MEDAL | ATHLETE | DOB | COUNTRY | MARK | W/I | RECORD | NOTES |
|---|---|---|---|---|---|---|---|
| | - | | INA | 41.8 | | | |
| | . Somisry | | INA | 41.8 | | | |
| | - | | INA | 41.8 | | | |
| | Jootje Pesak Oroh | | INA | 41.8 | | | |
| | Ezzedin Yacoub Hamed | 1943 | EGY | 42.3 | | | |
| | Abdel Nabi El Moghazi | | EGY | 42.3 | | | |
| | Mohamed Rihan | | EGY | 42.3 | | | |
| | Mohamed Ahmed El Guindi | | EGY | 42.3 | | | |
| | - | | IRQ | 42.6 | | | |
| | - | | IRQ | 42.6 | | | |
| | . El Chabikilky | | IRQ | 42.6 | | | |
| | Falih Fahmi | 1940 | IRQ | 42.6 | | | |

=== 4x400m ===
| MEDAL | ATHLETE | DOB | COUNTRY | MARK | W/I | RECORD | NOTES |
|---|---|---|---|---|---|---|---|
| | - | | EGY | 3:25.6 | | | |
| | - | | EGY | 3:25.6 | | | |
| | - | | EGY | 3:25.6 | | | |
| | - | | EGY | 3:25.6 | | | |
| | - | | IRQ | 3:29.4 | | | |
| | - | | IRQ | 3:29.4 | | | |
| | - | | IRQ | 3:29.4 | | | |
| | - | | IRQ | 3:29.4 | | | |
| | - | | LBA | 3:33.4 | | | |
| | - | | LBA | 3:33.4 | | | |
| | - | | LBA | 3:33.4 | | | |
| | - | | LBA | 3:33.4 | | | |
