= Abdel Hamid Khamis =

Egyptian long-distance runner

Personal information
- Nationality: Egyptian
- Born: 5 August 1940 (age 85) Kafr Al Zayat, Egypt
- Height: 165 cm (5 ft 5 in)
- Weight: 65 kg (143 lb)

Sport
- Sport: Long-distance running
- Events: 5,000 metres & 10,000 metres
- Club: Alexandria Sporting Club (ASC)

Abdel Hamid Khamis (born 5 August 1944) is an Egyptian long-distance runner. He competed in the men's 10,000 metres at the 1972 Summer Olympics.
