= Raymond Zembri =

French long-distance runner

Personal information
- Nationality: French
- Born: 26 December 1948 (age 77) Marseille, France

Sport
- Sport: Long-distance running
- Event: 5000 metres

Raymond Zembri (born 26 December 1948) is a French long-distance runner. He competed in the men's 5000 metres at the 1972 Summer Olympics.
