= Lahcen Samsam Akka =

Moroccan shot putter (born 1942)

Personal information
- Nationality: Moroccan
- Born: 14 June 1942 (age 83)

Sport
- Sport: Athletics
- Event: Shot put

Lahcen Samsam Akka (born 14 June 1942) is a Moroccan shot putter. He competed in the men's shot put at the 1964 Summer Olympics and the 1972 Summer Olympics.

Samsam pursued his studies and athletic career in the United States, starting at Oregon State University, where he earned a degree in soil chemistry in the mid-1960s. After returning to Morocco to work in a lab, he found the sedentary lifestyle unbearable and decided to go back to the USA to pursue a master's degree at San Jose State University.

Samsam's birthdate is recorded as 14 June 1942, in the 1964 Olympic entry lists and as simply 1945 in the 1972 lists. However, Samsam admitted that he fabricated both dates. He explained that his parents were illiterate and lived in the countryside, so they never recorded his actual date of birth, which remains unknown.
