= Manuel Soriano =

Spanish hurdler

Personal information
- Nationality: Spanish
- Born: 8 December 1945 (age 80)

Sport
- Sport: Track and field
- Event: 400 metres hurdles

Manuel Soriano (born 8 December 1945) is a Spanish hurdler. He competed in the men's 400 metres hurdles at the 1972 Summer Olympics.
