= Renato Martini =

Italian long-distance runner

Personal information
- Nationality: Italian
- Born: 12 November 1949 (age 76) Tortona, Italy

Sport
- Sport: Long-distance running
- Event: Marathon

Renato Martini (born 12 November 1949) is an Italian former long-distance runner. He competed in the marathon at the 1972 Summer Olympics.
