= Pasquale Busca =

Italian racewalker (born 1948)

Personal information
- Nationality: Italian
- Born: 16 October 1948 (age 77) Melilli, Italy
- Height: 1.83 m (6 ft 0 in)
- Weight: 68 kg (150 lb)

Sport
- Country: Italy
- Sport: Athletics
- Event: Race walk
- Club: G.S. Fiamme Gialle

Achievements and titles
- Personal best: 20 km walk: 1:32.16 (1969)
Medal record
Mediterranean Games
Gold medal – first place	1971 Smirne	20 km walk

Pasquale Busca (born 16 October 1948) is an Italian former racewalker.

== Biography ==
He competed in the 1968 Summer Olympics in the 20 km event, placing 12th with a time of 1:37:32. He has 19 caps in national team from 1967 to 1973.

== National titles ==
Pasquale Busca has won one time the individual national championship.

- 1 win in 20 km race walk (1971)
