= Mansour Guettaya =

Tunisian middle-distance runner (1949–2024)

Personal information
- Born: 26 December 1949 Es Souda, French Tunisia
- Died: 11 June 2024 (aged 74)

Sport
- Country: Tunisia
Medal record
Men's athletics
Representing Tunisia
Mediterranean Games
Gold medal – first place	1971 İzmir	800 m
Gold medal – first place	1971 İzmir	1500 m

Mansour Guettaya (26 December 1949 – 11 June 2024) was a Tunisian middle distance runner who competed in the 1972 Summer Olympics. Guettaya died on 11 June 2024, at the age of 74.
