= Gian Marco Schivo =

Italian high jumper

Marco Schivo
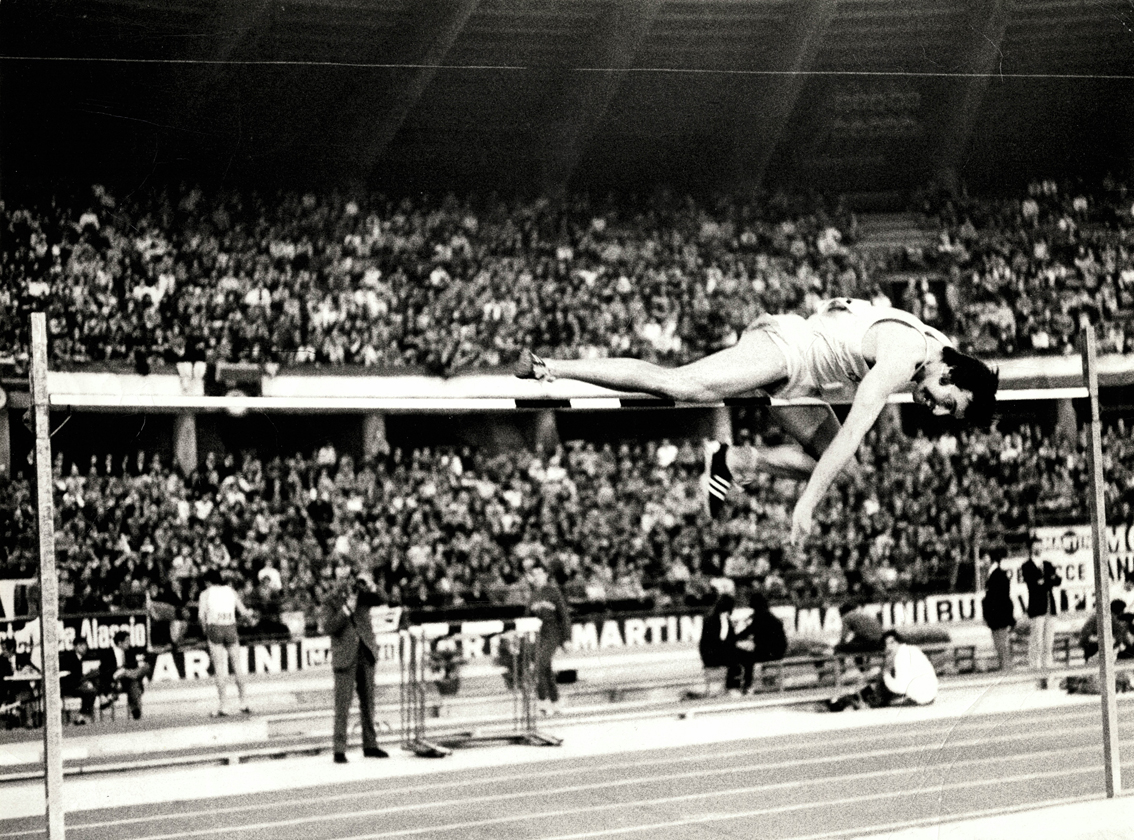

Personal information
- Nationality: Italian
- Born: 6 May 1949 (age 77) Toulon, France
- Height: 183 cm (6 ft 0 in)
- Weight: 74 kg (163 lb)

Sport
- Sport: Athletics
- Event: high jump
- Club: ALCO
Medal record
Men's Athletics
Representing Italy
Mediterranean Games
Gold medal – first place	1971 Izmir	High Jump

Gian Marco Schivo (born 6 May 1949) is an Italian retired high jumper who competed at the 1972 Summer Olympics.

== Biography ==
He won the gold medal at the 1971 Mediterranean Games and finished seventeenth at the 1972 Olympic Games. His personal best jump is 2.17 metres, achieved in May 1972 in Rome.

His daughter Arianna Schivo competed at the 2016 Summer Olympics in equestrian.
