= Miro Kocuvan (athlete, born 1947) =

Yugoslav sprinter (born 1947)

Personal information
- Nationality: Yugoslav
- Born: 16 July 1947 (age 78)

Sport
- Sport: Sprinting
- Event: 4 × 400 metres relay

Miro Kocuvan (born 16 July 1947) is a Yugoslav sprinter. He competed in the men's 4 × 400 metres relay at the 1972 Summer Olympics.
