= Malika Hadky =

Moroccan middle-distance runner

Personal information
- Nationality: Moroccan
- Born: 1952 (age 73–74)

Sport
- Sport: Middle-distance running
- Event: 800 metres

Malika Hadky (born 1952) is a Moroccan middle-distance runner. She competed in the women's 800 metres at the 1972 Summer Olympics.
