= Maria Stella Masocco =

Italian discus thrower and shot putter

Personal information
- National team: Italy: 17 caps (1967-1972)
- Born: 17 March 1948 (age 78) Bagnone, Italy

Sport
- Sport: Athletics
- Event(s): Discus throw Shot put
- Club: CUS Roma

Achievements and titles
- Personal bests: Discus throw: 57.54 (1972); Shot put: 15.43 m (1972)
Medal record
Mediterranean Games
| Silver medal – second place | 1971 Izmir | Discus throw |

Maria Stella Masocco (born 17 March 1948) is a former Italian discus thrower and shot putter.

She is the mother of the volleyball players Guendalina and Veronica Buffon as well as the former goalkeeper of the national football team Gianluigi Buffon.

== Career ==
Her personal bests, 57.54 m set in 1973, at the end of the 2020 outdoor season is still the 8th best all-time performance of the Italian lists. She sets national record as in shot put as in discus throw.

== National titles ==
Masocco won three national championships at individual senior level.

- Italian Athletics Championships
  - Shot put: 1971, 1972 (2)
- Italian Athletics Indoor Championships
  - Shot put: 1972

== See also ==
- Italian all-time top lists - Discus throw
