= Daniele Giovanardi =

Italian former sprinter and hurdles (born 1950)

Personal information
- Nationality: Italian
- Born: 15 January 1950 (age 76) Modena, Italy
- Height: 1.78 m (5 ft 10 in)
- Weight: 70 kg (154 lb)

Sport
- Country: Italy
- Sport: Athletics
- Event: Sprint
- Club: C.S. Carabinieri

Achievements and titles
- Personal best: 400 m: 47.1 (1972)
Medal record
Mediterranean Games
Gold medal – first place	1971 Izmir	4x400 m

Daniele Giovanardi (born 15 January 1950) is an Italian former sprinter who specialise in the 400 metres and in hurdling, the 400 metres hurdles.

== Biography ==
He competed in the 1972 Summer Olympics.

== National titles ==
- 1 win in 400 metres hurdles at the Italian Athletics Championships (1973)

== See also ==
- Italy national relay team
