= Laura Nappi =

Italian sprinter

Personal information
- Nationality: Italian
- Born: 11 December 1949 (age 76) Genoa, Italy

Sport
- Sport: Sprinting
- Event: 100 metres
Medal record
Representing Italy
Mediterranean Games
| Gold medal – first place | 1971 Izmir | 4x100m relay |
| Bronze medal – third place | 1975 Algiers | 4x100m relay |

Laura Nappi (born 11 December 1949) is an Italian sprinter. She competed in the women's 100 metres at the 1972 Summer Olympics.

== Biography ==
From 1970 to 1976, she was Italian champion twelve times in six different disciplines. Of these titles, eight were won in relays (including two indoor), three in the 200-meter dash, and one in the long jump.

In 1972, she took part in the Olympic Games in Munich, where she competed in the 100-meter dash, finishing out of the qualifying rounds, and in the 4×100-meter relay, but again failed to reach the final.
