= Derek Graham =

Runner from Northern Ireland

Personal information
- Nationality: British (Northern Irish)
- Born: 3 September 1941 (age 84)
- Height: 188 cm (6 ft 2 in)
- Weight: 68 kg (150 lb)

Sport
- Sport: Athletics
- Club: 9th Old Boys Harriers, Belfast

Derek Austin Graham (born 3 September 1941) is a retired distance athlete from Northern Ireland. The first Northern Irish runner to break 4 minutes for the mile, he was ranked number 1 in the U.K. and Ireland over 2 miles/3000 m, 3 miles/5000 m and cross country at various periods in the 1960s.

== Biography ==
Graham competed in the 1964 Tokyo Olympics for Great Britain, finishing seventh in his initial heat for the 5000m race.

Graham was selected for nine consecutive International cross country races (later to be recognised as the World Cross country), finishing second in 1966 in Rabat, Morocco. He also competed in the 1966 European Championships.

Graham represented the 1966 Northern Irish Team at the 1966 British Empire and Commonwealth Games in Kingston, Jamaica, participating in the two athletics events; the 1 mile race and the 3 miles race.

Graham was a 21-times Northern Irish champion, winning the mile title six times, the cross-country title seven times, the 3 miles title seven times and 6 mile title in 1967.

He was the Irish record holder for various distances through this time. At the 1970 British Commonwealth Games, Graham picked up a virus which later developed into myalgic encephalomyelitis, ultimately ending his athletics career.

== Personal bests ==
Distance	Mark
1 mile	3:59.2
3000 m	8:03
2 miles	8:33.8
3 miles	13:15.6
5000 m	13:41.4
10,000 m	29:00.06
Half marathon	1:03:53

Sporting positions
Preceded by Ron Hill	Men's Half Marathon Best Year Performance; 1970	Succeeded by Ron Hill
