= Fatima El-Faquir =

Moroccan sprinter (born 1954)

Personal information
- Nationality: Moroccan
- Born: 1954 (age 71–72)

Sport
- Sport: Sprinting
- Event: 100 metres
Medal record
Women's athletics
Representing Morocco
African Championships
Gold medal – first place	1979 Dakar	400 m hurdles
Bronze medal – third place	1979 Dakar	100 m hurdles

Fatima El-Faquir (born 1954) is a Moroccan sprinter, coach, and sports professor. She was the first Moroccan to compete in the Olympics. She competed in the women's 100 metres at the 1972 Summer Olympics in Munich and was the first African Champion in 400m hurdles in Dakar in 1979. She was the first female athlete to give Morocco a title. She is the Professor of Higher Education at the Moroccan National Institute of Sport.

El-Faquir studied Physical Exercise and Sport at the University of Bucharest in Romania from 1973 to 1978 and then at University of Montreal in Canada. She married and raised a family with her coach Aziz Daouda. She coached the Moroccan national athletics (track) team and coached Nawal El Moutawakel in hurdles and relay events.

She organized events like the Pan Arab Games in Rabat, Morocco in 1985, the Francophone Games in 1989, the Cross Country World Championship in 1998, and the Youth World Championships in Marrakesh in 2006. She holds Presidential positions on the Confederation of African Athletics, North Africa, and the National Association of Women's Physical Activities and Sport.

In 2017, she defended her dissertation in French entitled "Moroccan High Level Athletes: Emergence, Visibility, Erasure 1956-2016."
