= Mario Vecchiato =

Italian hammer thrower (born 1948)

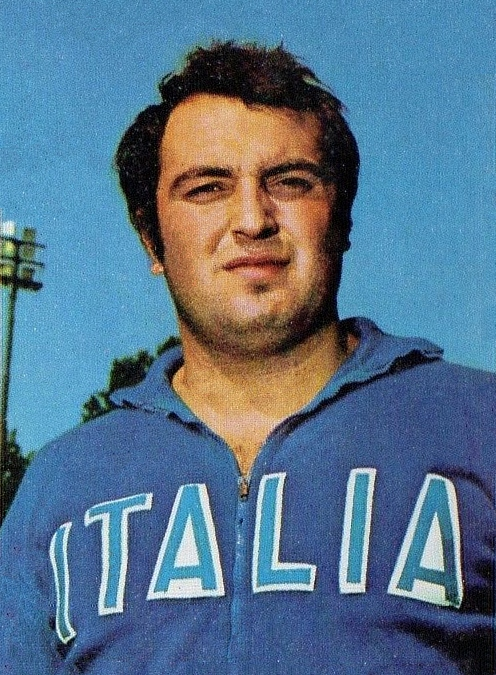

Personal information
- Born: 24 October 1948 (age 77) Udine, Italy
- Height: 184 cm (6 ft 0 in)
- Weight: 110 kg (243 lb)

Sport
- Sport: Athletics
- Event: Hammer throw
- Club: Libertas Udine

Achievements and titles
- Personal best: 74.36 m (1972)
Medal record
Representing Italy
Mediterranean Games
Silver medal – second place	1971 Izmir	Hammer throw

Mario Vecchiato (born 24 October 1948) is a retired Italian hammer thrower. He won a silver medal at the 1971 Mediterranean Games and placed tenth at the 1971 European Championships and ninth at the 1972 Summer Olympics.
