= Giuliana Amici =

Italian javelin thrower

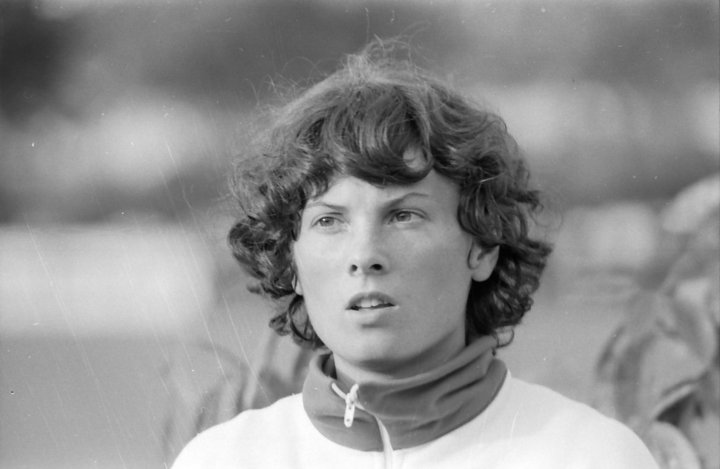

Personal information
- Nationality: Italian
- Born: 24 February 1952 (age 74) Forlì

Sport
- Country: Italy
- Sport: Athletics
- Event: Javelin throw

Achievements and titles
- Personal best: Javelin throw 58.72 m (1978)

Giuliana Amici (24 February 1952) is a former Italian javelin thrower, later became masters athlete.

== Biography ==
Giuliana Amici won nine (consecutive years from 1970 to 1978) national championships at senior level. She also competed at the 1974 European Championships and 1978 European Championships. After her senior career she did not abandon the competitive sport, so to continue in the masters athletics and won the gold medal at the 2007 World Masters Championships held in Riccione.

== National records ==
In her career she has set 9 senior national records, from 1970 to 1997, the last of which was broken by Fausta Quintavalla.

- Javelin throw: 56.26 m ( (Italy) Ravenna, 2 July 1977) - holder till 30 August 1977

== Personal best ==
- Javelin throw: 58.72 m ( (Italy) Rome, 26 July 1978)

== Achievements ==
Masters

Year	Competition	Venue	Event	Position	Measure	Notes
1998	European Veterans Championships	(Italy) Cesenatico	Javelin throw W45	1st	41.05 m	
2007	World Masters Championships	(Italy) Riccione	Javelin throw W55	1st	36.69 m	NR
2016	European Veterans Indoor Championships	(Italy) Ancona	Javelin throw W60	3rd	28.62 m	

== National titles ==
- Italian Athletics Championships
  - Javelin throw: 1970, 1971, 1972, 1973, 1974, 1975, 1976, 1977, 1978
