= Sergio Liani =

Italian hurdler

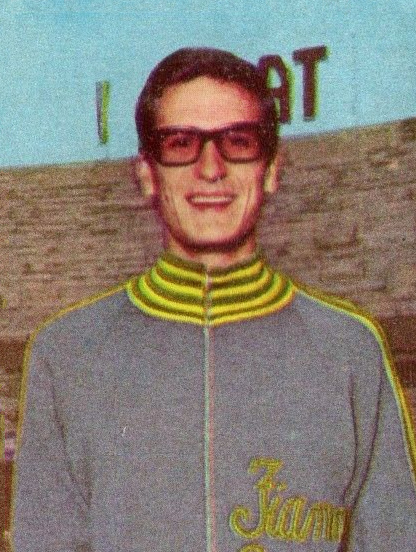

Personal information
- Nationality: Italian
- Born: 13 August 1943 (age 82) Rome, Italy
- Height: 1.82 m (5 ft 11 1/2 in)
- Weight: 70 kg (154 lb)

Sport
- Country: Italy
- Sport: Athletics
- Event: 110 m hurdles
- Club: Cus Roma

Achievements and titles
- Personal best: 110 mH: 13.6 (1971)
Medal record
Men's athletics
Representing Italy
European Indoor Championships
Bronze medal – third place	1971 Sofia	60 m hurdles
Mediterranean Games
Silver medal – second place	1967 Tunis	110 m hurdles
Silver medal – second place	1971 İzmir	110 m hurdles
Universiade
Bronze medal – third place	1970 Turin	110 m hurdles

Sergio Liani (born 3 August 1943) is a retired Italian hurdler. He competed at the 1968 and 1972 Olympics in the 110 m event, but failed to reach the final.

During his career Liani won four national 110 m titles, in 1970, 1971, 1973 and 1977. He set his personal best (13.6 seconds) in June 1971 in Prague.

== Achievements ==
Year	Tournament	Venue	Result	Event	Notes
1966	European Championships	Budapest, Hungary	6th	110 m hurdles	
1967	Mediterranean Games	Tunis, Tunisia	2nd	110 m hurdles	
1970	Universiade	Turin, Italy	3rd	110 m hurdles	
1971	European Indoor Championships	Sofia, Bulgaria	3rd	60 m hurdles	
1971	European Championships	Helsinki, Finland	6th	110 m hurdles	
1971	Mediterranean Games	İzmir, Turkey	2nd	110 m hurdles	

== National titles ==
He won 7 national championships at individual senior level.

- Italian Athletics Championships
  - 100 m hs: 1970, 1971, 1973, 1977
- Italian Indoor Athletics Championships
  - 60 m hs: 1970, 1971, 1979

== See also ==
- Italy national athletics team – More caps
