= Omar Ghizlat =

Moroccan sprinter

Personal information
- Nationality: Moroccan
- Born: 8 September 1950 (age 75)

Sport
- Sport: Sprinting
- Event: 400 metres
Medal record
Men's athletics
Representing Morocco
African Championships
Bronze medal – third place	1982 Cairo	200 m

Omar Ghizlat (born 8 September 1950) is a Moroccan sprinter. He competed in the 400 metres at the 1968 Summer Olympics and the 1972 Summer Olympics. He also won the 100m at the 1980 Islamic Games.
