= Maddalena Grassano =

Italian sprinter

Personal information
- National team: Italy: 14 caps (1971–1973)
- Born: 4 May 1949 (age 77) Mandrogne, Italy
- Height: 1.70 m (5 ft 7 in)
- Weight: 63 kg (139 lb)

Sport
- Sport: Sports of athletics
- Event: 4 × 100 metres relay
- Club: Fiat Torino

Achievements and titles
- Personal best: 100 m: 11.8 (1972)

Maddalena Grassano (born 4 May 1949) is an Italian former sprinter. She competed in the women's 4 × 100 metres relay at the 1972 Summer Olympics.
