= Vittorio Visini =

Italian racewalker

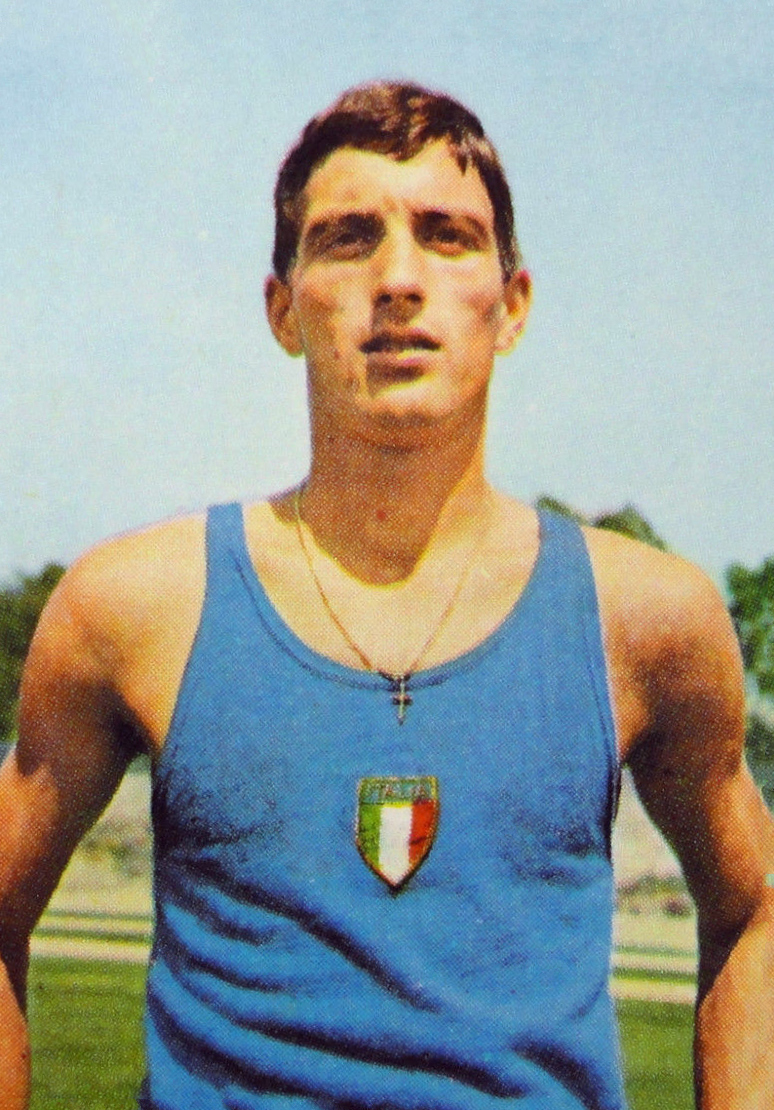

Personal information
- Nationality: Italian
- Born: 25 May 1945 (age 81) Chieti, Italy
- Height: 1.78 m (5 ft 10 in)
- Weight: 64 kg (141 lb)

Sport
- Country: Italy
- Sport: Athletics
- Event: Race walk
- Club: C.S. Carabinieri

Achievements and titles
- Personal bests: 20 km – 1:25.49 (1981); 50 km – 3:56.00 (1978)
Medal record
Representing Italy
Mediterranean Games
Gold medal – first place	1967 Tunis	50 km walk
Silver medal – second place	1971 Smirne	50 km walk

Vittorio Visini (born 25 May 1945) is a retired Italian race walker. He competed in the 20 km and 50 km events at the 1968, 1972 and 1976 Olympics and finished in 6–8th place.

== Biography ==
From 1965 to 1982 Visini took part in 67 international competitions. He won 16 national titles: in the 20 km (1970), 50 km (1970–1975 and 1981), and 5 km indoor (1970–1976 and 1978). In retirement he worked as a racewalking coach.

== International competitions ==
Representing Italy
Year	Competition	Venue	Position	Event	Result	Notes
1968	Olympic Games	Mexico City, Mexico	6th	50 km walk	4:36:33	
1972	Olympic Games	Munich, West Germany	8th	20 km walk	1:32:30	
1972	Olympic Games	Munich, West Germany	7th	50 km walk	4:08:31	
1976	Olympic Games	Montreal, Canada	8th	20 km walk	1:29:31	

== National titles ==
Visini won 16 national championships at individual senior level.

- Italian Athletics Championships
  - 20 km racewalk: 1970 (1)
  - 50 km racewalk: 1970, 1971, 1972, 1973, 1974, 1975, 1981 (7)
- Italian Indoor Athletics Championships
  - 2000 m racewalk: 1970, 1971 (2)
  - 3000 m racewalk: 1972, 1973, 1974, 1975, 1976, 1978 (6)

== See also ==
- Italy national athletics team – More caps
- Italian Athletics Championships – Multi winners
