= Giuseppe Cindolo =

Italian long-distance runner

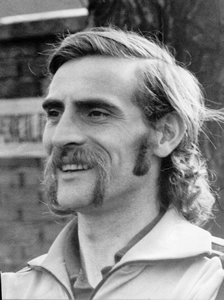

Personal information
- Nationality: Italian
- Born: 5 August 1945 (age 80) Avellino, Italy
- Height: 1.73 m (5 ft 8 in)
- Weight: 60 kg (132 lb)

Sport
- Country: Italy
- Sport: Athletics
- Event: Long distance running
- Club: Alco Rieti

Achievements and titles
- Personal bests: 10000 m: 28'27"05 (1974); Marathon: 2h11'45" (1975)
Medal record
Men's athletics
Representing Italy
European Championships
Bronze medal – third place	1974 Rome	10000 m
Universiade
Bronze medal – third place	1970 Turin	5000 m
Mediterranean Games
Bronze medal – third place	1967 Tunis	5000 m
Bronze medal – third place	1971 İzmir	10000 m

Giuseppe "Pippo" Cindolo (born 5 August 1945) is an Italian former long-distance runner, third at the 1974 European Athletics Championships on 10000 metres.

== Biography ==
Cindolo has 48 caps in Italy national athletics team (from 1966 to 1976). In his career he participated in two editions of the Olympic Games and won the Italian Athletics Championships 14 times.

== Achievements ==
Year	Competition	Venue	Position	Event	Performance	Notes
1967	Mediterranean Games	(Tunisia) Tunis	3rd	5000 metres	14'05"0	
1970	Universiade	(Italy) Turin	3rd	5000 metres	14'01"4	
1971	Mediterranean Games	(Turkey) İzmir	3rd	10000 metres	28'59"0	
1974	European Championships	(Italy) Rome	3rd	10000 metres	28'27"05	

== National titles ==
Cindolo won the Italian Athletics Championships 14 times: 13 outdoor and one indoor.

Outdoor

- 2 wins in 5000 metres (1974, 1975)
- 7 wins in 10000 metres (1969, 1970, 1971, 1972, 1973, 1974, 1975)
- 3 wins in Marathon (1974, 1975, 1976)
- 1 win in Half marathon (1974)
- 1 win in Cross (1965, 1966, 1967, 1968, 1969)

Indoor

- 1 win in 3000 metres (1971)

== See also ==
- Italy national athletics team - More caps
