= Donata Govoni =

Italian sprinter (born 1944)

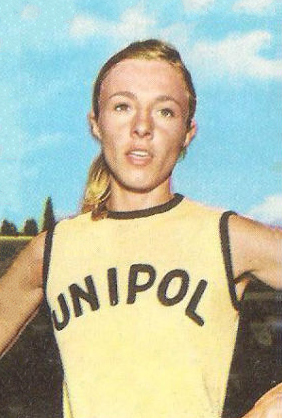
- Donata Govoni in 1970

Personal information
- Nationality: Italian
- Born: 4 March 1944 (age 82) Pieve di Cento, Italy
- Height: 1.70 m (5 ft 7 in)
- Weight: 53 kg (117 lb)

Sport
- Country: Italy
- Sport: Athletics
- Event(s): Sprint; 800 metres
- Club: Fontana Bologna; Unipol Bologna

Achievements and titles
- Personal bests: 400 m: 53.2 (1970); 800 m: 2:03.9 (1971)
Medal record
Mediterranean Games
Silver medal – second place	1967 Tunis	100 metres
Silver medal – second place	1971 Izmir	400 metres
Silver medal – second place	1971 Izmir	800 metres

Donata Govoni married Sandrini (born 4 March 1944) is a former Italian sprinter and middle distance runner, who competed at two Olympic Games.

== Biography ==
Govoni began her career as a 100 and 200 metres sprinter and then moved progressively to 400 metres and 800 metres. From 1961 to 1972 she took part in 49 international competitions, including the 1968 and 1972 Olympics.

Govoni won 26 individual Italian national championships from 1961 to 1975. In Italy only two women have won more: Agnese Maffeis (38) and Marisa Masullo (30).

Govoni finished second behind Dorothy Hyman in the 220 yards event at the British 1963 WAAA Championships.

== Achievements ==
Year	Competition	Venue	Position	Event	Performance	Note
1968	Olympic Games	Mexico City	Heat	400 metres	54.7	
1970	European Cup	(Romania) Bucharest	3rd	400 metres	53.2	
1972	Olympic Games	(West Germany) Munich	QF	400 metres	53.78	

== National titles ==
Event	Wins	61	62	63	64	65	66	67	68	69	70	71	72	73	74	75
100 metres	7	•	•	•		•	•	•		•						
200 metres	5	•		•		•	•	•								
400 metres	7						•	•	•	•		•		•	•	•
800 metres	2										•		•			
400 metres indoor	2										•			•		
800 metres indoor	2											•	•			
Cross country running	1											•				

== See also ==
- Italian Athletics Championships – Women multi winners
