= Renzo Cramerotti =

Italian javelin thrower

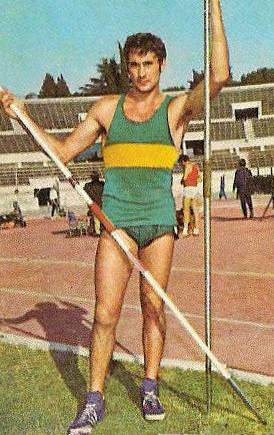

Personal information
- Nationality: Italian
- Born: 9 December 1947 (age 78) Trento, Italy
- Height: 1.79 m (5 ft 10 in)
- Weight: 83 kg (183 lb)

Sport
- Country: Italy
- Sport: Athletics
- Event: Javelin throw
- Club: Alco Rieti

Achievements and titles
- Personal best: 83.50 m (1971)
Medal record
Representing Italy
Mediterranean Games
Gold medal – first place	1971 Izmir	Javelin throw
Bronze medal – third place	1975 Algiers	Javelin throw

Renzo Cramerotti (born 9 December 1947) is a retired male javelin thrower from Italy who won two medals at the Mediterranean Games. He competed at the 1972 Olympics and finished in 20th place.

== Biography ==
Nationally Cramerotti won seven javelin titles, in 1970–1973 and 1975–1977.

== Achievements ==
Year	Competition	Venue	Position	Notes
1971	Mediterranean Games	İzmir, Turkey	1st	78.04 m
1972	Olympic Games	Munich, West Germany	20th	71.12 m
1975	Mediterranean Games	Algiers, Algeria	3rd	69.84 m

== National titles ==
Cramerotti won 7 national championships at individual senior level.

- Italian Athletics Championships
  - Javelin throw: 1970, 1971, 1972, 1973, 1975, 1976, 1977 (7)
