= Cecilia Molinari =

Italian sprinter

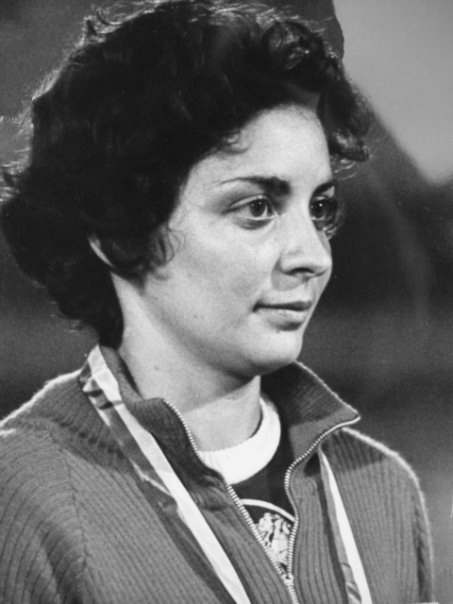
- Molinari in 1971

Personal information
- Nationality: Italian
- Born: 22 November 1949 (age 76) Borgo Val di Taro, Italy
- Height: 1.58 m (5 ft 2 in)
- Weight: 56 kg (123 lb)

Sport
- Country: Italy
- Sport: Athletics
- Event: Sprint
- Club: Libertas Piacenza

Achievements and titles
- Personal best: 100 m: 11.3 (1972)
Medal record
Mediterranean Games
| Gold medal – first place | 1971 İzmir | 100 metres |
| Gold medal – first place | 1971 İzmir | 4 × 100 m relay |
| Bronze medal – third place | 1975 Algers | 4 × 100 m relay |

Cecilia Molinari (born 22 November 1949 in Borgo Val di Taro) is a former Italian sprinter.

== Biography ==
Cecilia Molinari participated in one edition of the Summer Olympics (1972), and she had 36 caps in the national team from 1966 to 1976. She also participated at two editions of European Championships.

== Achievements ==
| Year | Competition | Venue | Position | Event | Performance | Note |
|---|---|---|---|---|---|---|
| 1972 | Olympic Games | (West Germany) Munich | QF | 100 metres | 11.63 | |
| 1972 | Olympic Games | (West Germany) Munich | Heat | 4 × 100 m relay | 44.62 | |

== National titles ==
Cecilia Molinari has won ten times the individual national championship.

- 6 wins on 100 metres (1968, 1970, 1971, 1972, 1973, 1974)
- 4 wins on 60 metres indoor (1970, 1971, 1972, 1973)

== See also ==
- Italy national relay team
