= 1971 Mediterranean Games =

6th edition of the Mediterranean Games

VI Mediterranean Games İzmir 1971
- Host city: İzmir, Turkey
- Nations: 14
- Athletes: 1,362
- Events: 137 in 17 sports
- Opening: 6 October 1971
- Closing: 17 October 1971
- Opened by: Cevdet Sunay
- Main venue: İzmir Atatürk Stadium

The 1971 Mediterranean Games, officially known as the VI Mediterranean Games, and commonly known as Izmir 1971, were the 6th Mediterranean Games. The Games were held in İzmir, Turkey, from 6 to 17 October 1971, where 1,362 athletes (1,235 men and 127 women) from 15 countries participated. There were a total of 137 medal events from 17 different sports.

== Participating nations ==
- Algeria (38)
- Egypt (109)
- France (50)
- Greece (159)
- Italy (162)
- Lebanon (2)
- Libya (36)
- Malta (11)
- Morocco (76)
- Spain (148)
- Syria (108)
- Tunisia (83)
- Turkey (219)
- Yugoslavia (161)

== Sports ==
- Athletics (32)
- Basketball (1)
- Boxing (11)
- Cycling (4)
- Diving (2)
- Fencing (4)
- Football (1)
- Gymnastics (14)
- Judo (5)
- Sailing (3)
- Shooting (5)
- Swimming (22)
- Tennis (2)
- Volleyball (1)
- Water polo (1)
- Weightlifting (9)
- Wrestling (20)

== Medal table ==
* Host nation (Turkey)

Rank	Nation	Gold	Silver	Bronze	Total
1	Italy	51	38	30	119
2	Yugoslavia	27	25	26	78
3	Spain	18	25	24	67
4	Turkey*	18	12	15	45
5	Greece	8	8	24	40
6	Egypt	7	10	12	29
7	France	7	9	7	23
8	Tunisia	3	6	2	11
9	Morocco	0	2	6	8
9	Syria	0	2	6	8
11	Algeria	0	0	1	1
11	Libya	0	0	1	1
Totals (12 entries)		139	137	154	430

== See also ==
- International Mediterranean Games Committee
- Mediterranean Games Athletic results at gbrathletics website
