= 1965 International Cross Country Championships =

- Organisers: ICCU
- Edition: 52nd
- Date: March 20
- Host city: Ostend, West Flanders, Belgium
- Venue: Hippodrome Wellington
- Events: 2
- Distances: 7.5 mi (12.1 km) men 4.7 mi (7.5 km) junior men
- Participation: 174 athletes from 15 nations

The 1965 International Cross Country Championships was held in Ostend, Belgium, at the Hippodrome Wellington on March 20, 1965. The competition saw first appearances of athletes from Algeria, New Zealand and West Germany. A report on the event was given in the Glasgow Herald.

Complete results for men, junior men, medallists, and the results of British athletes were published.

== Medallists ==
Event	Gold		Silver		Bronze	
Individual
Men; 7.5 mi (12.1 km)	Jean Fayolle; France	36:48	Mel Batty; England	36:48	Mohamed Gammoudi; Tunisia	37:00
Junior Men; 4.7 mi (7.5 km)	Jony Dumon; Belgium	21:36	Albien van Holsbeek; Belgium	21:44	David Walker; England	21:51
Team
Men	England	55	France	55	New Zealand	110
Junior Men	Belgium	9	England	14	Morocco	34

== Individual Race Results ==
=== Men's (7.5 mi / 12.1 km) ===
Rank	Athlete	Nationality	Time
1st place, gold medalist(s)	Jean Fayolle	France	36:48
2nd place, silver medalist(s)	Mel Batty	England	36:48
3rd place, bronze medalist(s)	Mohamed Gammoudi	Tunisia	37:00
4	Michel Bernard	France	37:04
5	Derek Graham	Ireland	37:07
6	Jeff Julian	New Zealand	37:12
7	Ron Hill	England	37:13
8	Michel Jazy	France	37:16
9	Jean Vaillant	France	37:18
10	John Cooke	England	37:19
11	Mike Freary	England	37:20
12	Gerry North	England	37:22
13	Dominic Keily	England	37:24
14	Bernard Maroquin	France	37:26
15	Jim Alder	Scotland	37:28
16	Peter Welsh	New Zealand	37:30
17	Mhedheb Hannachi	Tunisia	37:31
18	Pat Sidon	New Zealand	37:38
19	Yves Martinage	France	37:41
20	Norris Wyatt	New Zealand	37:48
21	Tim Johnston	England	37:49
22	Hamida Addéche	Algeria	37:50
23	Francisco Aritmendi	Spain	37:51
24	Bryan Rose	New Zealand	37:54
25	Ahmed Zammel	Tunisia	37:56
26	Geoffrey Pyne	New Zealand	37:58
27	Henri Clerckx	Belgium	38:03
28	Fernando Aguilar	Spain	38:04
29	Lorenzo Gutierrez	Spain	38:05
30	Hedi Hamrouni	Tunisia	38:06
31	Grant Wheeler	New Zealand	38:06
32	Mariano Haro	Spain	38:07
33	Iluminado Corcuera	Spain	38:09
34	Marcel Senners	France	38:15
35	Hans Hüneke	West Germany	38:17
36	Hans Gerlach	West Germany	38:18
37	Guy Caillet	France	38:19
38	Ben Assou El Ghazi	Morocco	38:21
39	Fergus Murray	Scotland	38:22
40	Barry Everitt	New Zealand	38:23
41	Ahmed Oukbouch	Morocco	
42	José Maiz	Spain	
43	Andy Brown	Scotland	
44	Luigi Conti	Italy	
45	Ali Khamassi	Tunisia	
46	Alfredo Rizzo	Italy	
47	Jesús Fernandez	Spain	
48	Carlos Pérez	Spain	
49	Allal Ben Saoudi	Morocco	
50	Cyrille van Geert	Belgium	
51	Werner Dössegger	Switzerland	39:30
52	Jean Dewachter	Belgium	
53	Arno Krausse	West Germany	
54	Ron Grove	England	
55	Lutz Krausse	West Germany	
56	Abdeslem Bouchta	Morocco	
57	Pierre De Pauw	Belgium	
58	Lachie Stewart	Scotland	
59	Mohamed Ben Mohamed	Morocco	
60	Jim McNamara	Ireland	
61	Joseph van Lent	Belgium	
62	Piet Beelen	Netherlands	
63	Marcel Vandewattyne	Belgium	
64	Raymond van den Borre	Belgium	
65	Noel Tijou	France	
66	Labidi Ayachi	Tunisia	
67	Franco Sommaggio	Italy	
68	Mike Wiggs	England	
69	Giorgio Zanfini	Italy	
70	Ammar Khemiri	Tunisia	
71	Ian McCafferty	Scotland	
72	Hamoud Ameur	Algeria	
73	Egbert Nijstad	Netherlands	
74	Pat McMahon	Ireland	
75	Alan Parkinson	New Zealand	
76	Josephus Scheyen	Netherlands	
77	Edgar Friedli	Switzerland	41:18
78	Alec Brown	Scotland	
79	George Blackburn	Ireland	
80	Robert Williams	Wales	
81	Manuel Alonso	Spain	
82	Günter Bretag	West Germany	
83	Bob Roath	Wales	
84	Carlo Sacchi	Italy	
85	Jacques van Eekelen	Netherlands	
86	Piet de Haas	Netherlands	
87	Mohamed Benmaguini	Morocco	
88	Brendan Deary	Ireland	
89	John Collins	Wales	
90	Hedydd Davies	Wales	
91	Tony Murphy	Ireland	
92	Klaus Vieth	West Germany	
93	Walter Dietiker	Switzerland	41:48
94	John Godding	Wales	
95	Youssef Mastouri	Tunisia	
96	Joep Delnoye	Netherlands	
97	Bert Smit	Netherlands	
98	Denis Jouret	Belgium	
99	Oskar Leupi	Switzerland	42:18
100	Don Macgregor	Scotland	
101	Mohamed Ben Moulay	Morocco	
102	William Ewing	Scotland	
103	Harry Simpson	Ireland	
104	Silvio De Florentiis	Italy	
105	Said Benmaguini	Morocco	
106	Umberto Lagana	Italy	
107	Manfred Steffny	West Germany	
108	Hammadi Ben Mohamed	Morocco	
109	Hugo Eisenring	Switzerland	42:48
110	Ken Flowers	Wales	
111	Gerry Barrell	Wales	
112	Chris Loosley	Wales	
113	Alfons Ida	West Germany	
114	Hansruedi Knill	Switzerland	43:18
115	Belkacem Chikhane	Algeria	
116	Belkacem Ben Sahraoui	Algeria	
117	Huub Coumans	Netherlands	
118	Tom Edmunds	Wales	
119	Martin Ellenberger	Switzerland	43:38
120	Hansruedi Schneider	Switzerland	
121	Abderrahmane Delhoum	Algeria	
122	A. Tounsi	Algeria	
123	Mohamed Iridir	Algeria	
124	Mathieu Reinders	Netherlands	
125	C. Grabsi	Algeria	
—	Jim Hogan	Ireland	DNF
—	Gaston Roelants	Belgium	DNF
—	Kaspar Scheiber	Switzerland	DNF
—	Hassan Amri	Algeria	DNF
—	Roger Young	Scotland	DNF

=== Junior Men's (4.7 mi / 7.5 km) ===
Rank	Athlete	Nationality	Time
1st place, gold medalist(s)	Jony Dumon	Belgium	21:36
2nd place, silver medalist(s)	Albien Van Holsbeek	Belgium	21:44
3rd place, bronze medalist(s)	David Walker	England	21:51
4	Philip Romaine	England	21:53
5	Eddie Knox	Scotland	21:54
6	Erik Gyselinck	Belgium	21:56
7	John Caine	England	21:58
8	Francesco Sabatino	Italy	22:04
9	Gilbert Hanssens	Belgium	22:06
10	Larbi Oukada	Morocco	22:17
11	Bouabib Chaoui	Morocco	22:24
12	José Morera	Spain	22:25
13	Miloud Lhouceine	Morocco	22:35
14	Haddou Jaddour	Morocco	22:37
15	Luigi Carnicelli	Italy	22:39
16	Dehbi Elyazid	Morocco	22:39
17	Ian Young	Scotland	22:44
18	Giuseppe Cindolo	Italy	22:47
19	Tony Ashton	England	22:47
20	Francesco Valenti	Italy	22:51
21	Manuel Porta	Spain	22:53
22	Walter Eadie	Scotland	22:55
23	Mohamed Ben Slimane	Tunisia	22:59
24	Trevor Wright	England	23:02
25	Dick Wedlock	Scotland	23:06
26	Juan Angel Garay	Spain	23:15
27	Juan Hidalgo	Spain	23:15
28	Hamdouni Sghaier	Tunisia	23:18
29	Tahar Abassi	Tunisia	23:18
30	Gerry Williams	Wales	23:19
31	Johan Janssens	Belgium	23:43
32	Fredj Hemmemi	Tunisia	23:49
33	Will Francis	Wales	23:56
34	Abdelhamid Aït Yahia	Algeria	23:59
35	Belgacem Harrathi	Tunisia	24:01
36	Antonio Giancanterino	Italy	24:08
37	Bernie Plain	Wales	24:12
38	Abderrahmane Krideche	Algeria	24:22
39	Yahia Megdout	Algeria	24:34
40	Chakoufi	Algeria	24:37
41	Sadmi	Algeria	25:17
42	Don Price	Wales	
43	Jeff Kirby	Wales	
—	Francisco Collado	Spain	DNF

== Team Results ==
=== Men's ===
Rank	Country	Team	Points
1	England	Mel Batty; Ron Hill; John Cooke; Mike Freary; Gerry North; Dominic Keily	55
2	France	Jean Fayolle; Michel Bernard; Michel Jazy; Jean Vaillant; Bernard Maroquin; Yves Martinage	55
3	New Zealand	Jeff Julian; Peter Welsh; Pat Sidon; Norris Wyatt; Bryan Rose; Geoffrey Pyne	110
4	Tunisia	Mohamed Gammoudi; Mhedheb Hannachi; Ahmed Zammel; Hedi Hamrouni; Ali Khamassi; Labidi Ayachi	186
5	Spain	Francisco Aritmendi; Fernando Aguilar; Lorenzo Gutierrez; Mariano Haro; Iluminado Corcuera; José Maiz	187
6	Scotland	Jim Alder; Fergus Murray; Andy Brown; Lachie Stewart; Ian McCafferty; Alec Brown	304
7	Belgium	Henri Clerckx; Cyrille van Geert; Jean Dewachter; Pierre De Pauw; Joseph van Lent; Marcel Vandewattyne	310
8	Morocco	Ben Assou El Ghazi; Ahmed Oukbouch; Allal Ben Saoudi; Abdeslem Bouchta; Mohamed Ben Mohamed; Mohamed Benmaguini	330
9	Federal Republic of Germany	Hans Hüneke; Hans Gerlach; Arno Krausse; Lutz Krausse; Günter Bretag; Klaus Vieth	353
10	Ireland	Derek Graham; Jim McNamara; Pat McMahon; George Blackburn; Brendan Deary; Tony Murphy	397
11	Italy	Luigi Conti; Alfredo Rizzo; Franco Sommaggio; Giorgio Zanfini; Carlo Sacchi; Silvio De Florentiis	414
12	Netherlands	Piet Beelen; Egbert Nijstad; Josephus Scheyen; Jacques van Eekelen; Piet de Haas; Joep Delnoye	478
13	Switzerland	Werner Dössegger; Edgar Friedli; Walter Dietiker; Oskar Leupi; Hugo Eisenring; Hansruedi Knill	543
14	Wales	Robert Williams; Bob Roath; John Collins; Hedydd Davies; John Godding; Ken Flowers	546
15	Algeria	Hamida Addéche; Hamoud Ameur; Belkacem Chikhane; Belkacem Ben Sahraoui; Abderrahmane Delhoum; A. Tounsi	568

=== Junior Men's ===
Rank	Country	Team	Points
1	Belgium	Jony Dumon; Albien Van Holsbeek; Erik Gyselinck	9
2	England	David Walker; Philip Romaine; John Caine	14
3	Morocco	Larbi Oukada; Bouabib Chaoui; Miloud Lhouceine	34
4	Italy	Francesco Sabatino; Luigi Carnicelli; Giuseppe Cindolo	41
5	Scotland	Eddie Knox; Ian Young; Walter Eadie	44
6	Spain	José Morera; Manuel Porta; Juan Angel Garay	59
7	Tunisia	Mohamed Ben Slimane; Hamdouni Sghaier; Tahar Abassi	80
8	Wales	Gerry Williams; Will Francis; Bernie Plain	100
9	Algeria	Abdelhamid Aït Yahia; Abderrahmane Krideche; Yahia Megdout	111

== Participation ==
An unofficial count yields the participation of 174 athletes from 15 countries.

- Algeria (14)
- Belgium (14)
- England (14)
- France (9)
- Ireland (8)
- Italy (12)
- Morocco (14)
- Netherlands (9)
- New Zealand (9)
- Scotland (13)
- Spain (14)
- Switzerland (9)
- Tunisia (13)
- Wales (14)
- West Germany (8)

== See also ==
- 1965 in athletics (track and field)
