= 1967 International Cross Country Championships =

- Organisers: ICCU
- Edition: 54th
- Date: 18 March 1967
- Host city: Barry, Glamorgan, Wales
- Events: 3
- Distances: 7.5 mi (12.1 km) men / 4.35 mi (7.0 km) junior men / 1.9 mi (3.0 km) women
- Participation: 152 athletes from 12 nations

The 1967 International Cross Country Championships was held in Barry, Wales, on 18 March 1967. For the first time, an official women's competition was held. A report on the event was given in the Glasgow Herald.

Complete results for men, junior men, women, medallists, and the results of British athletes were published.

== Medallists ==
Event	Gold		Silver		Bronze	
Individual
Men; 7.5 mi (12,1 km)	Gaston Roelants; Belgium	36:03	Tim Johnston; England	36:20	Bryan Rose; New Zealand	36:27
Junior Men; 4.35 mi (7.0 km)	Eddie Knox; Scotland	24:42	Eddy Van Butsele; Belgium	24:44	Brooks Mileson; England	24:49
Women; 1.9 mi (3.0 km)	Doris Brown; United States	14:28	Rita Lincoln; England	15:05	Peggy Mullins; Ireland	15:07
Team
Men	England	70	New Zealand	96	France	122
Junior Men	England	12	Belgium	30	Scotland	33
Women	England	17	Ireland	35	Scotland	50

== Individual Race Results ==
=== Men's (7.5 mi / 12.1 km) ===
Rank	Athlete	Nationality	Time
1st place, gold medalist(s)	Gaston Roelants	Belgium	36:03
2nd place, silver medalist(s)	Tim Johnston	England	36:20
3rd place, bronze medalist(s)	Bryan Rose	New Zealand	36:27
4	Lachie Stewart	Scotland	36:30
5	Willie Olivier	South Africa	36:32
6	José Maiz	Spain	36:33
7	Guy Texereau	France	36:34
8	Noel Tijou	France	36:41
9	Derek Graham	Ireland	36:44
10	Dick Taylor	England	36:47
11	Ron Hill	England	36:48
12	Peter Welsh	New Zealand	36:49
13	François Lacour	France	36:50
14	Mike Tagg	England	36:52
15	Mike Turner	England	37:02
16	Gerhard Dekkers	South Africa	37:06
17	Eddie Gray	New Zealand	37:09
18	John Hillen	England	37:10
19	Mike Ryan	New Zealand	37:12
20	Tom O'Riordan	Ireland	37:12
21	Jeff Julian	New Zealand	37:14
22	Carlos Pérez	Spain	37:16
23	Jim Alder	Scotland	37:17
24	Norris Wyatt	New Zealand	37:20
25	Barry Everitt	New Zealand	37:25
26	Alan Rushmer	England	37:28
27	Dennis Morrison	South Africa	37:29
28	Michel Bernard	France	37:31
29	Desmond Torr	South Africa	37:36
30	Robert Folie	Belgium	37:38
31	Grant Wheeler	New Zealand	37:40
32	Bernard Maroquin	France	37:41
33	Gaston Heleven	Belgium	37:42
34	Gérard Goutailler	France	37:43
35	Francisco Aritmendi	Spain	37:44
36	Geoff Bacon	South Africa	37:45
37	Rex Maddaford	New Zealand	37:46
38	Cornelius van Antwerp	South Africa	37:47
39	Hamoud Ameur	France	37:48
40	Gilbert Gauthier	France	37:49
41	Jean-Yves Le Flohic	France	37:50
42	Jim Wright	Scotland	37:51
43	John Godding	Wales	37:52
44	Pierre De Pauw	Belgium	37:54
45	Werner Dössegger	Switzerland	37:58
46	Bob Holt	England	37:59
47	Andy Brown	Scotland	38:00
48	Arie Meeuwissen	Netherlands	38:01
49	Walter Dietiker	Switzerland	38:02
50	Jim McNamara	Ireland	38:15
51	Patrick McLagan	Scotland	38:16
52	Hansruedi Knill	Switzerland	38:17
53	Alfons Sidler	Switzerland	38:19
54	Peter Whewell	South Africa	38:20
55	Piet Beelen	Netherlands	38:26
56	Cyril Leigh	Wales	38:26
57	Javier Álvarez	Spain	38:30
58	Brian Jeffs	Wales	38:32
59	André Dehertoghe	Belgium	38:33
60	Alec Brown	Scotland	38:37
61	Aad Steylen	Netherlands	38:38
62	Jan Zijderlaan	Netherlands	38:39
63	Alistair Blamire	Scotland	38:43
64	Manuel Alonso	Spain	38:45
65	Jo van den Hoogen	Netherlands	38:46
66	Alan Joslyn	Wales	38:47
67	Roy Mack	Wales	38:48
68	Peter Kneubühl	Switzerland	38:49
69	Harry Simpson	Ireland	38:50
70	Llewellyn Leppan	South Africa	38:51
71	Hedydd Davies	Wales	38:58
72	Iluminado Corcuera	Spain	38:59
73	Hans Rüdisühli	Switzerland	39:18
74	Pete Fagan	Ireland	39:19
75	Jim O'Brien	Wales	39:20
76	Jacques van Eekelen	Netherlands	39:22
77	Fernando Aguilar	Spain	39:24
78	Albien Van Holsbeek	Belgium	39:35
79	Mariano Haro	Spain	39:36
80	Denis Jouret	Belgium	39:37
81	Rafael Vergauwen	Belgium	39:45
82	George Blackburn	Ireland	39:47
83	Emil Mächler	Switzerland	39:51
84	Patrick Lynch	Ireland	39:54
85	Huub Coumans	Netherlands	40:07
86	Tony Hopkins	Ireland	40:13
87	Michael Coningham	South Africa	40:24
88	Jim Brennan	Scotland	40:41
89	George Mol	Netherlands	40:50
—	Ian McCafferty	Scotland	DNF
—	Pedro Sacristán	Spain	DNF
—	Fred Bell	Wales	DNF
—	Johnny Dumon	Belgium	DNF

=== Junior Men's (4.35 mi / 7.0 km) ===
Rank	Athlete	Nationality	Time
1st place, gold medalist(s)	Eddie Knox	Scotland	24:42
2nd place, silver medalist(s)	Eddy Van Butsele	Belgium	24:44
3rd place, bronze medalist(s)	Brooks Mileson	England	24:49
4	Colin Moxsom	England	24:59
5	Frank Briscoe	England	25:06
6	Yvo Van Nuffelen	Belgium	25:13
7	John Rix	England	25:20
8	Tony Simmons	Wales	25:25
9	Francisco Collado	Spain	25:36
10	Ken Bartlett	England	25:47
11	Ron McAndrew	Wales	25:53
12	Ewald Keust	Switzerland	26:12
13	Norman Morrison	Scotland	26:17
14	Félix Lluch	Spain	26:19
15	Angel Cob	Spain	26:22
16	Sjef Hensgens	Netherlands	26:23
17	Gwynn Davis	Wales	26:42
18	John Powell	Wales	26:47
19	John Myatt	Scotland	26:54
20	Willie Day	Scotland	26:55
21	Rini Marynissen	Netherlands	26:57
22	Omer Van Noten	Belgium	26:59
23	Hanspeter Wehrli	Switzerland	27:00
24	Ulrich Maurer	Switzerland	27:01
25	Tim Hopkins	Wales	27:07
26	Piet Vonck	Netherlands	27:17
27	James Cook	Scotland	27:27
28	André Dolder	Switzerland	27:45
29	Willy Polleunis	Belgium	27:57
30	André Ornelis	Belgium	27:58
31	Robert Strik	Netherlands	28:00
32	Teodoro Barrio	Spain	28:50
—	Juan Carreras	Spain	DNF

=== Women's (1.9 mi / 3.0 km) ===
Rank	Athlete	Nationality	Time
1st place, gold medalist(s)	Doris Brown	United States	14:28
2nd place, silver medalist(s)	Rita Lincoln	England	15:05
3rd place, bronze medalist(s)	Peggy Mullins	Ireland	15:07
4	Joyce Smith	England	15:16
5	Pamela Davies	England	15:18
6	Joy Jordan	England	15:20
7	Ann O'Brien	Ireland	15:24
8	Patricia Brown	England	15:36
9	Margaret MacSherry	Scotland	15:45
10	Iris Lincoln	England	15:54
11	Georgena Craig	Scotland	16:11
12	Brenda Robinson	Ireland	16:17
13	Maureen Conlan	Ireland	16:22
14	Leslie Watson	Scotland	16:29
15	Patricia Cole	United States	16:41
16	Margaret Purdon	Scotland	16:46
17	Mary Norton	Ireland	16:48
18	Pat Sullivan	Wales	16:52
19	Jean Lochhead	Wales	17:07
20	Margaret Fleming	Scotland	17:14
21	Emily Hopkins	Ireland	17:18
22	Catherine Kelly	Scotland	17:22
23	Delyth Davies	Wales	17:41
24	Jacqueline Clifford	Wales	18:28
25	Brenda Meredith	Wales	18:30
26	Janet Eynon	Wales	18:34

== Team Results ==
=== Men's ===
Rank	Country	Team	Points
1	England	Tim Johnston; Dick Taylor; Ron Hill; Mike Tagg; Mike Turner; John Hillen	70
2	New Zealand	Bryan Rose; Peter Welsh; Eddie Gray; Mike Ryan; Jeff Julian; Norris Wyatt	96
3	France	Guy Texereau; Noel Tijou; François Lacour; Michel Bernard; Bernard Maroquin; Gérard Goutailler	122
4	South Africa	Willie Olivier; Gerhard Dekkers; Dennis Morrison; Desmond Torr; Geoff Bacon; Cornelius van Antwerp	151
5	Scotland	Lachie Stewart; Jim Alder; Jim Wright; Andy Brown; Patrick McLagan; Alec Brown	227
6	Belgium	Gaston Roelants; Robert Folie; Gaston Heleven; Pierre De Pauw; André Dehertoghe; Albien Van Holsbeek	245
7	Spain	José Maiz; Carlos Pérez; Francisco Aritmendi; Javier Álvarez; Manuel Alonso; Iluminado Corcuera	256
8	Ireland	Derek Graham; Tom O'Riordan; Jim McNamara; Harry Simpson; Pete Fagan; George Blackburn	304
9	Switzerland	Werner Dössegger; Walter Dietiker; Hansruedi Knill; Alfons Sidler; Peter Kneubühl; Hans Rüdisühli	340
10	Wales	John Godding; Cyril Leigh; Brian Jeffs; Alan Joslyn; Roy Mack; Hedydd Davies	361
11	Netherlands	Arie Meeuwissen; Piet Beelen; Aad Steylen; Jan Zijderlaan; Jo van den Hoogen; Jacques van Eekelen	367

=== Junior Men's ===
Rank	Country	Team	Points
1	England	Brooks Mileson; Colin Moxsom; Frank Briscoe	12
2	Belgium	Eddy Van Butsele; Yvo Van Nuffelen; Omer Van Noten	30
3	Scotland	Eddie Knox; Norman Morrison; John Myatt	33
4	Wales	Tony Simmons; Ron McAndrew; Gwynn Davis	36
5	Spain	Francisco Collado; Félix Lluch; Angel Cob	38
6	Switzerland	Ewald Keust; Hanspeter Wehrli; Ulrich Maurer	59
7	Netherlands	Sjef Hensgens; Rini Marynissen; Piet Vonck	63

=== Women's ===
Rank	Country	Team	Points
1	England	Rita Lincoln; Joyce Smith; Pamela Davies; Joy Jordan	17
2	Ireland	Peggy Mullins; Ann O'Brien; Brenda Robinson; Maureen Conlan	35
3	Scotland	Margaret MacSherry; Georgena Craig; Leslie Watson; Margaret Purdon	50
4	Wales	Pat Sullivan; Jean Lochhead; Delyth Davies; Jacqueline Clifford	84

== Participation ==
An unofficial count yields the participation of 152 athletes from 12 countries.

- Belgium (14)
- England (19)
- France (9)
- Ireland (14)
- Netherlands (12)
- New Zealand (9)
- Scotland (20)
- South Africa (9)
- Spain (14)
- Switzerland (11)
- United States (2)
- Wales (19)

== See also ==
- 1967 in athletics (track and field)
