= 1961 International Cross Country Championships =

- Organisers: ICCU
- Edition: 48th
- Date: March 26
- Host city: Nantes, Pays de la Loire, France
- Events: 2
- Distances: 8.9 mi (14.5 km) men / 4.7 mi (7.5 km) junior men
- Participation: 109 athletes from 10 nations

The 1961 International Cross Country Championships was held in Nantes, France, on March 26, 1961. This year, an official junior championship (for athletes under 21 on the day of the race) was introduced. A report on the men's event was given in the Glasgow Herald.

Complete results for men, junior men, medalists, and the results of British athletes were published.

== Medalists ==
Event	Gold		Silver		Bronze	
Individual
Men; 8.9 mi (14.3 km)	Basil Heatley; England	45:22.2	Antonio Amorós; Spain	45:46	Martin Hyman; England	45:56.4
Junior Men; 4.7 mi (7.5 km)	Colin Robinson; England	26:20.4	Alan Simpson; England	26:24.4	Mariano Haro; Spain	26:25.2
Team
Men	Belgium	54	England	71	France	119
Junior Men	England	11	Belgium	18	Spain	39

== Individual Race Results ==
=== Men's (8.9 mi / 14.3 km) ===
Rank	Athlete	Nationality	Time
1st place, gold medalist(s)	Basil Heatley	England	45:22.2
2nd place, silver medalist(s)	Antonio Amorós	Spain	45:46
3rd place, bronze medalist(s)	Martin Hyman	England	45:56.4
4	Henri Clerckx	Belgium	46:03.6
5	Aurèle Vandendriessche	Belgium	46:06.8
6	Hedwig Leenaert	Belgium	46:21
7	Michel Bernard	France	46:23
8	Roy Fowler	England	46:27
9	Salah Beddiaf	France	46:39
10	Mohamed Saïd	Morocco	46:46
11	Gaston Roelants	Belgium	46:54
12	Jean Vaillant	France	46:57
13	Louis van Praet	Belgium	46:58
14	Bakir Benaissa	Morocco	47:05
15	Marcel Vandewattyne	Belgium	47:07
16	Ted Matley	England	47:09
17	Manuel Alonso	Spain	47:14
18	Graham Everett	Scotland	47:24
19	Denis Jouret	Belgium	47:31
20	Peter Wilkinson	England	47:34
21	Joe Connolly	Scotland	47:41
22	Pierre de Pauw	Belgium	47:43
23	Mike Turner	England	47:44
24	Alain Mimoun	France	47:46
25	Georg Steiner	Switzerland	47:51
26	Lahcen Ben Allal	Morocco	47:56
27	Fernando Aguilar	Spain	48:08
28	Andy Brown	Scotland	48:12
29	Alfonso Vidal	Spain	48:16
30	Pat Killeen	Ireland	48:18
31	Maurice Chiclet	France	48:19
32	Hammadi Ben Mohamed	Morocco	48:20
33	Alastair Wood	Scotland	48:23
34	Oskar Leupi	Switzerland	48:24
35	Frank Seal	England	48:25
36	Jean Fayolle	France	48:28
37	Hamid	Morocco	48:28
38	Hamida Addéche	France	48:33
39	Yves Jeannotat	Switzerland	48:34
40	Hans Rüdisühli	Switzerland	48:39
41	Hamoud Ameur	France	48:42
42	Gordon Eadie	Scotland	48:44
43	Moha Ouali	Morocco	48:46
44	David Richards Jun.	Wales	48:47
45	Bertie Messitt	Ireland	48:49
46	Bruce Tulloh	Scotland	49:03
47	Luis García	Spain	49:06
48	Frans van der Hoeven	Belgium	49:10
49	Mohamed Ben Hassan	Morocco	49:10
50	Norman Horrell	Wales	49:15
51	Adrian Jackson	Scotland	49:18
52	Gerald McIntyre	Ireland	49:20
53	Ron Franklin	Wales	49:31
54	José Molíns	Spain	49:39
55	Niklaus Näf	Switzerland	49:42
56	Mohamed Lahcen	Morocco	49:45
57	William Heiberg	England	49:46
58	Stan Taylor	Scotland	49:48
59	Alfons Sidler	Switzerland	49:48
60	Willie Dunne	Ireland	50:06
61	José María Alday	Spain	50:11
62	Benny O'Sullivan	Ireland	50:17
63	Harry Wilson	Wales	50:22
64	Francois Fatton	Switzerland	50:30
65	Mick Connolly	Ireland	50:31
66	Brian Jeffs	Wales	50:31
67	Aurelio Aguirre	Spain	51:06
68	Hugo Eisenring	Switzerland	51:13
69	Gerry North	England	51:21
70	Roger Harrison-Jones	Wales	50:43
71	Roy Profitt	Wales	51:51
72	Paul Knill	Switzerland	52:08
73	Tommy Dunne	Ireland	52:43
74	Colm Holohan	Ireland	52:53
75	Ian Harris	Scotland	53:07
—	Tomas Ballestin	Spain	DNF
—	Rhadi Ben Abdesselam	Morocco	DNF
—	Francis Duleau	France	DNF
—	Jim Douglas	Ireland	DNF

=== Junior Men's (4.7 mi / 7.5 km) ===
Rank	Athlete	Nationality	Time
1st place, gold medalist(s)	Colin Robinson	England	26:20.4
2nd place, silver medalist(s)	Alan Simpson	England	26:24.4
3rd place, bronze medalist(s)	Mariano Haro	Spain	26:25.2
4	Abdeslem Bouchta	Morocco	26:33.8
5	Luc van der Smissen	Belgium	26:43
6	Raymond Crauwels	Belgium	26:47
7	Jean-Pierre Deraemaeker	Belgium	27:01
8	Thomas Pugh	England	27:13
9	Joseph Smolders	Belgium	27:28
10	Amara Gahlouzi	Tunisia	27:32
11	Amel Leborgne	France	27:35
12	André de Hertoghe	Belgium	27:42
13	Hadj Ben Sitel	Morocco	27:44
14	Abdelhamid Yazidi	Tunisia	27:55
15	Anthony Platt	England	27:59
16	José María Sarriegui	Spain	28:14
17	Mohamed Frigui	Tunisia	28:20
18	Armand Trichet	France	28:21
19	Ahmed Zammel	Tunisia	28:24
20	José María Alberdi	Spain	28:25
21	Noel Tijou	France	28:40
22	Paulino García	Spain	28:45
23	Ben Nouceur	Morocco	28:47
24	Ahmed Oukbouch	Morocco	29:00
25	Garnier	France	29:20
26	Geoffrey Wood	England	29:26
27	Lennen	France	29:36
28	A. Gerdane	Morocco	30:17
29	Francisco Vela	Spain	30:28
30	Mahmoud Ben Rabah	Tunisia	30:29

== Team Results ==
=== Men's ===
Rank	Country	Team	Points
1	Belgium	Henri Clerckx; Aurèle Vandendriessche; Hedwig Leenaert; Gaston Roelants; Louis van Praet; Marcel Vandewattyne	54
2	England	Basil Heatley; Martin Hyman; Roy Fowler; Ted Matley; Peter Wilkinson; Mike Turner	71
3	France	Michel Bernard; Salah Beddiaf; Jean Vaillant; Alain Mimoun; Maurice Chiclet; Jean Fayolle	119
4	Morocco	Mohamed Saïd; Bakir Benaissa; Lahcen Ben Allal; Hammadi Ben Mohamed; Hamid; Moha Ouali	162
5	Spain	Antonio Amorós; Manuel Alonso; Fernando Aguilar; Alfonso Vidal; Luis García; José Molíns	176
6	Scotland	Graham Everett; Joe Connolly; Andy Brown; Alastair Wood; Gordon Eadie; Bruce Tulloh	188
7	Switzerland	Georg Steiner; Oskar Leupi; Yves Jeannotat; Hans Rüdisühli; Niklaus Näf; Alfons Sidler	252
8	Ireland	Pat Killeen; Bertie Messitt; Gerald McIntyre; Willie Dunne; Benny O'Sullivan; Mick Connolly	314
9	Wales	David Richards Jun. Norman Horrell; Ron Franklin; Harry Wilson; Brian Jeffs; Roger Harrison-Jones	346

=== Junior Men's ===
Rank	Country	Team	Points
1	England	Colin Robinson; Alan Simpson; Thomas Pugh	11
2	Belgium	Luc van der Smissen; Raymond Crauwels; Jean-Pierre Deraemaeker	18
3	Spain	Mariano Haro; José María Sarriegui; José María Alberdi	39
4	Morocco	Abdeslem Bouchta; Hadj Ben Sitel; Ben Nouceur	40
5	Tunisia	Amara Gahlouzi; Abdelhamid Yazidi; Mohamed Frigui	41
6	France	Amel Leborgne; Armand Trichet; Noel Tijou	50

== Participation ==
An unofficial count yields the participation of 109 athletes from 10 countries.

- Belgium (14)
- England (14)
- France (14)
- Ireland (9)
- Morocco (14)
- Scotland (9)
- Spain (14)
- Switzerland (9)
- Tunisia (5)
- Wales (7)
