= 1962 International Cross Country Championships =

- Organisers: ICCU
- Edition: 49th
- Date: 24 March
- Host city: Sheffield, Yorkshire, England
- Venue: Graves Park
- Events: 2
- Distances: 7.5 mi (12.0 km) men / 4.7 mi (7.5 km) junior men
- Participation: 126 athletes from 10 nations

The 1962 International Cross Country Championships was held in Sheffield, England, at the Graves Park on 24 March 1962. A report on the event was given in the Glasgow Herald.

Complete results for men, junior men, medalists, and the results of British athletes were published.

== Medalists ==
| Event | Gold | | Silver | | Bronze | |
|---|---|---|---|---|---|---|
Individual
| Men; 7.5 mi (12.0 km) | Gaston Roelants; Belgium | 44:40 | Marcel Vandewattyne; Belgium | 44:46 | Mel Batty; England | 44:48 |
| Junior Men; 4.7 mi (7.5 km) | Abdeslem Bouchta; Morocco | 25:05 | Anthony Evans; England; Martin Heath; England | 25:23 | | |
Team
| Men | England | 44 | Spain | 115 | Belgium | 132 |
| Junior Men | England | 9 | Morocco | 28 | Scotland | 37 |

== Individual Race Results ==
=== Men's (7.5 mi / 12.0 km) ===
| Rank | Athlete | Nationality | Time |
|---|---|---|---|
| 1st place, gold medalist(s) | Gaston Roelants | Belgium | 44:40 |
| 2nd place, silver medalist(s) | Marcel Vandewattyne | Belgium | 44:46 |
| 3rd place, bronze medalist(s) | Mel Batty | England | 44:48 |
| 4 | John Anderson | England | 44:55 |
| 5 | Brian Hall | England | 45:02 |
| 6 | José Molíns | Spain | 45:04 |
| 7 | Mick Neville | Ireland | 45:05 |
| 8 | Gerry North | England | 45:08 |
| 9 | Andy Brown | Scotland | 45:09 |
| 10 | Rhadi Ben Abdesselam | Morocco | 45:12 |
| 11 | Ron Hill | England | 45:19 |
| 12 | Georges Fromont | Belgium | 45:20 |
| 13 | Brian Craig | England | 45:21 |
| 14 | Iluminado Corcuera | Spain | 45:28 |
| 15 | Fernando Aguilar | Spain | 45:30 |
| 16 | Colin Robinson | England | 45:31 |
| 17 | Willie Olivier | South Africa | 45:32 |
| 18 | Francisco Guardia | Spain | 45:33 |
| 19 | Salah Beddiaf | France | 45:35 |
| 20 | David Cooke | England | 45:36 |
| 21 | Youssef Mastouri | Tunisia | 45:37 |
| 22 | Jean-Pierre Delloye | Belgium | 45:46 |
| 23 | Keith Pearce | South Africa | 45:49 |
| 24 | Bakir Benaissa | Morocco | 45:50 |
| 25 | Alastair Wood | Scotland | 45:51 |
| 26 | Alain Mimoun | France | 45:52 |
| 27 | Ali Khamassi | Tunisia | 45:54 |
| 28 | Mohamed Said | Morocco | 45:58 |
| 29 | Antonio Amoros | Spain | 46:04 |
| 30 | Jan Barnard | South Africa | 46:05 |
| 31 | Stephanus Steyn | South Africa | 46:07 |
| 32 | Paul Genève | France | 46:07 |
| 33 | Francisco Aritmendi | Spain | 46:11 |
| 34 | Francis Duleau | France | 46:24 |
| 35 | Stan Taylor | Scotland | 46:25 |
| 36 | Jim Alder | Scotland | 46:25 |
| 37 | Callum Laing | Scotland | 46:26 |
| 38 | Labidi Ayachi | Tunisia | 46:27 |
| 39 | Alfonso Vidal | Spain | 46:34 |
| 40 | Derek Graham | Ireland | 46:34 |
| 41 | Mohamed Lahcen | Morocco | 46:35 |
| 42 | Mohamed Ben Mohamed | Morocco | 46:37 |
| 43 | Alexis Chauvel | France | 46:39 |
| 44 | Mhedheb Hannachi | Tunisia | 46:42 |
| 45 | Eddie Strong | England | 46:45 |
| 46 | Julius Saenen | Belgium | 46:46 |
| 47 | Hammadi Ben Mohamed | Morocco | 46:46 |
| 48 | Mohamed Gammoudi | Tunisia | 46:52 |
| 49 | Frans van der Hoeven | Belgium | 46:57 |
| 50 | Lahcen Ben Allal | Morocco | 47:01 |
| 51 | Ali Tarbag | Tunisia | 47:01 |
| 52 | Ahmed Ben Salah | Tunisia | 47:12 |
| 53 | John McDonnell | Ireland | 47:13 |
| 54 | Denis Jouret | Belgium | 47:13 |
| 55 | Moha Ouali | Morocco | 47:13 |
| 56 | Charles Minnaar | South Africa | 47:20 |
| 57 | Jim O'Brien | Wales | 47:21 |
| 58 | Bert Irving | Scotland | 47:21 |
| 59 | Pat Killeen | Ireland | 47:22 |
| 60 | Benny O'Sullivan | Ireland | 47:25 |
| 61 | Cyril Bentall | South Africa | 47:30 |
| 62 | Hedi Hamrouni | Tunisia | 47:33 |
| 63 | Norman Horrell | Wales | 47:42 |
| 64 | Hamida Addéche | France | 47:42 |
| 65 | Ron Franklin | Wales | 47:56 |
| 66 | Davie Simpson | Scotland | 47:57 |
| 67 | Maurice Chiclet | France | 48:15 |
| 68 | Mick Connolly | Ireland | 48:25 |
| 69 | Ammar Khemiri | Tunisia | 48:30 |
| 70 | Billy McCue | Ireland | 48:31 |
| 71 | Graham Everett | Scotland | 48:39 |
| 72 | Gerhardus Swanepoel | South Africa | 48:40 |
| 73 | Pascal Morris | Ireland | 48:41 |
| 74 | Joe O'Keefe | Ireland | 49:02 |
| 75 | Mohamed Ben Hassan | Morocco | 49:05 |
| 76 | Henri Lucas | France | 49:22 |
| 77 | Roger Harrison-Jones | Wales | 49:27 |
| 78 | Barrie Saunders | Wales | 49:31 |
| 79 | Alan Griffiths | Wales | 49:47 |
| 80 | John McLaren | Scotland | 49:48 |
| 81 | Robert Williams | Wales | 50:24 |
| 82 | Harry Wilson | Wales | 50:59 |
| 83 | Bryan Davies | Wales | 50:59 |
| — | Mariano Haro | Spain | DNF |
| — | André VandenDriessche | Belgium | DNF |
| — | Luis García | Spain | DNF |
| — | Raymond Janssen | France | DNF |

=== Junior Men's (4.7 mi / 7.5 km) ===
| Rank | Athlete | Nationality | Time |
|---|---|---|---|
| 1st place, gold medalist(s) | Abdeslem Bouchta | Morocco | 25:05 |
| 2nd place, silver medalist(s) | Anthony Evans | England | 25:23 |
| 2nd place, silver medalist(s) | Martin Heath | England | 25:23 |
| 4 | Ernie Pomfret | England | 25:33 |
| 5 | Tom Edmunds | Wales | 25:45 |
| 6 | Ahmed Zammel | Tunisia | 25:51 |
| 7 | David Bignell | England | 26:02 |
| 8 | Jesús Fernandez | Spain | 26:07 |
| 9 | Doug Fownes | England | 26:11 |
| 10 | Lachie Stewart | Scotland | 26:19 |
| 11 | Alasdair Heron | Scotland | 26:20 |
| 12 | Hadj Ben Sitel | Morocco | 26:23 |
| 13 | Lorenzo Gutierrez | Spain | 26:25 |
| 14 | Amara Gahlouzi | Tunisia | 26:32 |
| 15 | Ahmed Oukbouch | Morocco | 26:37 |
| 16 | Joe Finn | Scotland | 26:42 |
| 17 | Ben Nouceur | Morocco | 26:44 |
| 18 | Arthur Moody | Scotland | 26:51 |
| 19 | T. Hewitt | Ireland | 26:55 |
| 20 | Jorge Gonzalez | Spain | 26:56 |
| 21 | Craig Douglas | Scotland | 26:59 |
| 22 | Khalifa Seraj | Morocco | 27:01 |
| 23 | L. Nodswell | Ireland | 27:05 |
| 24 | Robert van Overmeiren | Belgium | 27:07 |
| 25 | Abdelhamid Yazidi | Tunisia | 27:11 |
| 26 | Luc van der Smissen | Belgium | 27:11 |
| 27 | José Perramon | Spain | 27:12 |
| 28 | Mohamed Frigui | Tunisia | 27:13 |
| 29 | Gilbert Maesschalk | Belgium | 27:17 |
| 30 | Mahmoud Ben Rabah | Tunisia | 27:20 |
| 31 | Winston Bradley | Wales | 27:26 |
| 32 | Andre van de Walle | Belgium | 27:27 |
| 33 | Pedro Sacristán | Spain | 27:35 |
| 34 | P. Keenan | Ireland | 27:50 |
| 35 | Brendan Dunne | Ireland | 28:23 |
| 36 | Alcwyn Price | Wales | 28:28 |
| 37 | Tony Murphy | Ireland | 28:34 |
| 38 | Fred Bell | Wales | 29:04 |
| 39 | Stephen Oultram | Wales | 29:34 |
| — | Marnix Cocquyt | Belgium | DNF |

== Team Results ==
=== Men's ===
| Rank | Country | Team | Points |
|---|---|---|---|
| 1 | England | Mel Batty; John Anderson; Brian Hall; Gerry North; Ron Hill; Brian Craig | 44 |
| 2 | Spain | José Molíns; Iluminado Corcuera; Fernando Aguilar; Francisco Guardia; Antonio Amoros; Francisco Aritmendi | 115 |
| 3 | Belgium | Gaston Roelants; Marcel Vandewattyne; Georges Fromont; Jean-Pierre Delloye; Julius Saenen; Frans van der Hoeven | 132 |
| 4 | Morocco | Rhadi Ben Abdesselam; Bakir Benaissa; Mohamed Said; Mohamed Lahcen; Mohamed Ben Mohamed; Hammadi Ben Mohamed | 192 |
| 5 | Scotland | Andy Brown; Alastair Wood; Stan Taylor; Jim Alder; Callum Laing; Bert Irving | 200 |
| 6 | South Africa | Willie Olivier; Keith Pearce; Jan Barnard; Stephanus Steyn; Charles Minnaar; Cyril Bentall | 218 |
| 7 | France | Salah Beddiaf; Alain Mimoun; Paul Genève; Francis Duleau; Alexis Chauvel; Hamida Addéche | 218 |
| 8 | Tunisia | Youssef Mastouri; Ali Khamassi; Labidi Ayachi; Mhedheb Hannachi; Mohamed Gammoudi; Ali Tarbag | 229 |
| 9 | Ireland | Mick Neville; Derek Graham; John McDonnell; Pat Killeen; Benny O'Sullivan; Mick Connolly | 287 |
| 10 | Wales | Jim O'Brien; Norman Horrell; Ron Franklin; Roger Harrison-Jones; Barrie Saunders; Alan Griffiths | 419 |

=== Junior Men's ===
| Rank | Country | Team | Points |
|---|---|---|---|
| 1 | England | Anthony Evans; Martin Heath; Ernie Pomfret | 9 |
| 2 | Morocco | Abdeslem Bouchta; Hadj Ben Sitel; Ahmed Oukbouch | 28 |
| 3 | Scotland | Lachie Stewart; Alasdair Heron; Joe Finn | 37 |
| 4 | Spain | Jesús Fernandez; Lorenzo Gutierrez; Jorge Gonzalez | 41 |
| 5 | Tunisia | Ahmed Zammel; Amara Gahlouzi; Abdelhamid Yazidi | 45 |
| 6 | Wales | Tom Edmunds; Winston Bradley; Alcwyn Price | 72 |
| 7 | Ireland | T. Hewitt; L. Nodswell; P. Keenan | 76 |
| 8 | Belgium | Robert van Overmeiren; Luc van der Smissen; Gilbert Maesschalk | 79 |

== Participation ==
An unofficial count yields the participation of 126 athletes from 10 countries.

- Belgium (13)
- England (13)
- France (9)
- Ireland (14)
- Morocco (14)
- Scotland (14)
- South Africa (7)
- Spain (14)
- Tunisia (14)
- Wales (14)
