= 1975 World Association of Veteran Athletes Championships =

Coordinates: 43.653611°N 79.584444°W

- Dates: 11-16 August 1975
- Host city: Toronto, Canada
- Venue: Centennial Park Stadium
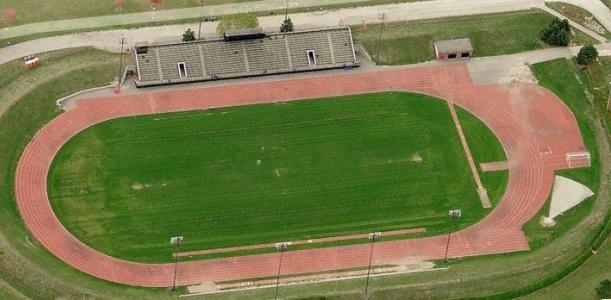
- Level: Masters
- Type: Outdoor
- Participation: 1427 athletes from 32 nations

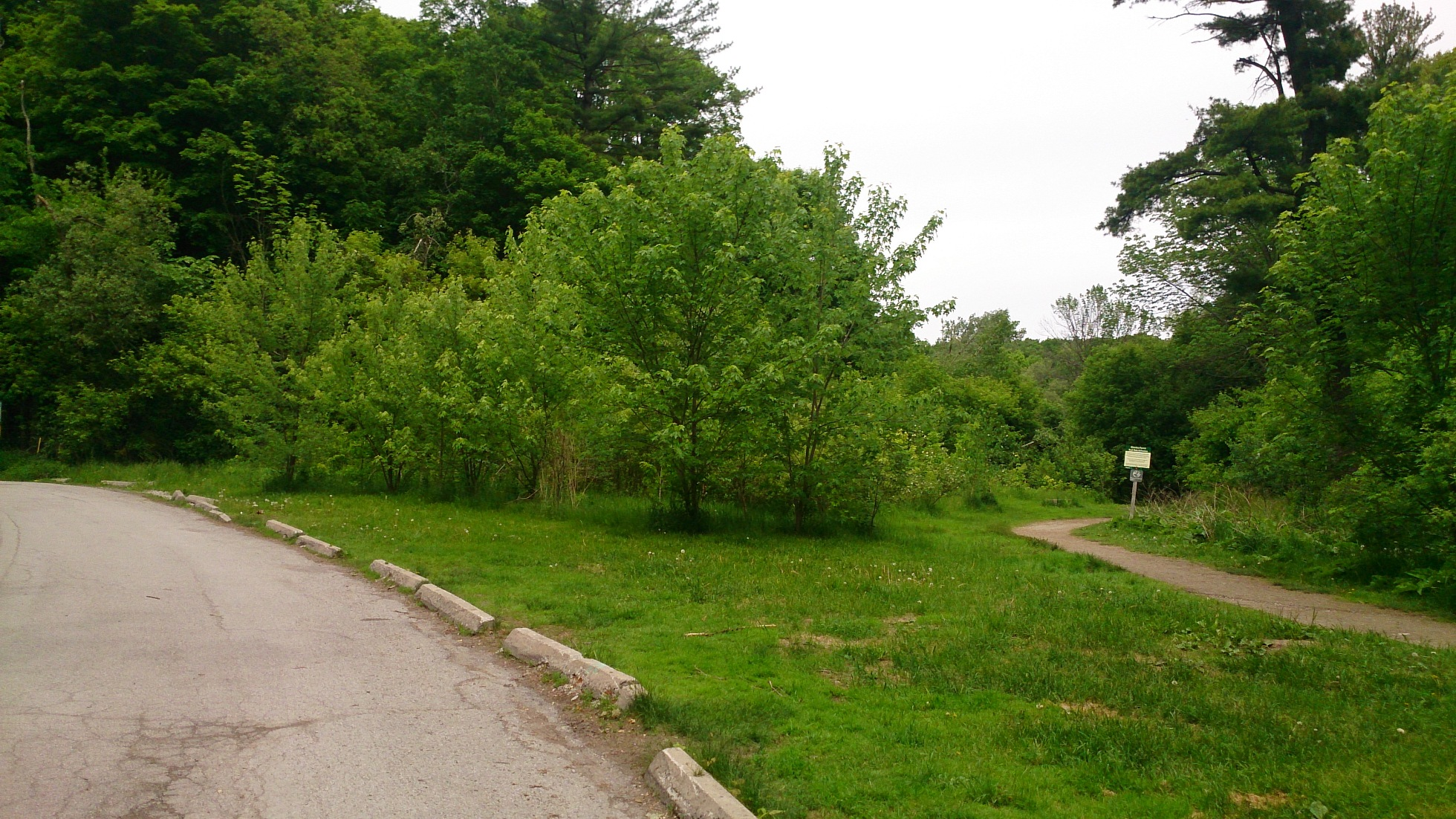
Sunnybrook Park

1975 World Association of Veteran Athletes Championships is the first in a series of World Outdoor Championships (also called World Masters Track and Field Championships).

The first international athletics (track and field) competitions for older athletes had taken place in 1972, when the United States Masters International Track Team (USMITT) and the Canadian Masters International Track Team (CMITT) organized a tour of Europe along with Australian and European athletes. The minimum age limit for this tour was 40 years, all men, with athletes divided into 10-year age groups called Veterans (now called Masters). This tour was called the "Olympic Tour" since it coincided with the 1972 Summer Olympics in Munich.

Following the success of this tour, the CMITT organized the first Championships in this series under the sponsorship of Canadian National Exhibition (CNE). This inaugural Championships took place in Toronto, Canada, from 11 to 16 August 1975.

The main venue was Centennial Park Stadium in the Etobicoke district of Toronto, while Cross Country was held in Sunnybrook Park.

The minimum age limit was 40 years for men and 35 years for women for this first Championships, with age groups of 5-year divisions for men and 10-year divisions for women. Younger athletes competed in the age group 30-39: Class 0 for men and Class 0W for women.

In meetings at the University of Toronto during the competitions, the World Association of Veteran Athletes (WAVA) was proposed as a governing body to organize future Championships in the series. A Local Organising Committee (LOC) would work in coordination with WAVA in running the Championships; the 1975 LOC was CMITT led by Don Farquharson, Farquharson would be elected WAVA president during General Assembly at the 1977 Championships. WAVA was renamed World Masters Athletics (WMA) at the 2001 Championships in Brisbane, Australia.

In addition to a full range of track and field events, non-stadia events included 10K Cross Country, 25K Race Walk, and Marathon.

== Controversy ==
The Canadian government attempted to ban South African and Rhodesian athletes due to the apartheid policy of their governments at that time, threatening to withdraw financial support if those athletes participated. After much discussion, those athletes were allowed to compete as individuals and not as members of the South African national team. A 5-member Yugoslavia team pulled out in protest of the South Africans participation. Anne McKenzie was a notable South African athlete, winning 4 gold medals.

== Results ==
Past Championships results are archived at WMA. Additional archives are available from Museum of Masters Track & Field as a pdf book.

With over 1,400 individual participants and 5,000 starts, this claimed to be the largest track and field meet ever held in North American to that point in time.

Among the notable performances, Jack Greenwood, Al Guidet, and Theo Orr had 4 victories, and Norm Bright had 3. Bright would suffer a car accident in 1978 that caused near blindness, but he would continue to compete in the Championships at least until 1981.

Results for 1975 are from Museum of Masters Track & Field pdf book unless otherwise noted. World records are indicated by WR .

Event	Age Group	Athlete Name	Country	Time
100 meters
	M30	G. Paton	United States	10.8 (+1.8)
	M40	Thane Baker	United States	11.1 (+3.8)
	M45	Jack Greenwood	United States	11.6 (NWI)
	M50	Richard Stolpe	United States	11.7 (+3.1)
	M55	Al Guidet	United States	12.1 (+2.1)
	M60	Yngve Brange	Sweden	12.9 (+2.0)
	M65	John Caruso	United States	13.6 (+3.0)
	M70	Winfield McFadden	United States	14.6 (+2.3)
	W30	A Parish	United States	13.2 (+2.3)
	W40	C. Payne	United Kingdom/England	12.3 (+2.4)
		3. Irene Obera	United States	12.5
	W50	Anne McKenzie	South Africa	14.9 (+2.3)
200 meters
	M30	Reginald Austin	Australia	22.1 (+0.5)
	M40	Manfred Garbisch	West Germany	22.7 (-0.6)
	M45	Jack Greenwood	United States	23.8 (+0.1)
	M50	Richard Stolpe	United States	24.7 (-1.5)
	M55	Al Guidet	United States	25.3 (-3.9)
	M60	Fritiof S. Sjöstrand	United States	27.2 (-3.0)
	M65	Ken Carnine	United States	29.6 (-1.8)
	M80	Fritz Schreiber	Sweden	44.7 (-1.0)
	M85	Duncan MacLean	United Kingdom/Scotland	49.2 (-1.0)
	M90	Charles Speechley	United Kingdom/England	53.3 (-1.0)
400 meters
	M40	Manfred Garbisch	West Germany	50.7
	M45	Don Cheek	United States	52.9
	M50	Richard Stolpe	United States	55.1
	M55	Al Guidet	United States	57.4
	M60	Fritiof S. Sjöstrand	United States	1:00.2
	M65	C. Kline	United States	1:05.8
	W30	A. Parish	United States	1:03.0
	W40	C. Mill	New Zealand	58.9
	W50	Anne McKenzie	South Africa	1:05.8
800 meters
	M30	W. Stewart	United States	1:55.0
	M40	L. Means	United States	2:00.2
		5. Ed Whitlock	Canada	2:01.3
	M45	L. Vagsmyr	Norway	2:02.6
	M50	Bill Fitzgerald	United States	2:01.9 WR
	M55	J. Stevens	Australia	2:21.3
	M60	Rıza Maksut İşman	Turkey	2:23.9
	M65	Norm Bright	United States	2:27.2
1500 meters
	M30	W. Stewart	United States	3:58.9
	M40	A. Thomas	Australia	3:59.5
		4. Ed Whitlock	Canada	4:02.5
	M45	A. Hughes	United Kingdom/England	4:15.3
	M50	B. Fitzgerald	United States	4:23.4
	M55	O. Evland	Sweden	4:48.9
	M60	A. Andberg	United States	5:01.3
	M65	Norm Bright	United States	4:59.8 WR
	M70	Harold Chapson	United States	5:35.5
	W30	S. Kieffer	United States	4:43.2
	W40	W. Klopfer	United States	5:05.7
	W50	Anne McKenzie	South Africa	5:07.3
3000 meters
	M40	A. Thomas	Australia	8:26.8
	M45	A. Hughes	United Kingdom/England	9:11.8
	M50	Theo Orr	Australia	9:22.2 WR
	M55	J. Gilmour	Australia	9:28.0
	M60	William Andberg	United States	10:46.9 WR
	M65	Merv Jenkinson	Australia	10:52.0
		2. Norm Bright	United States	11.14.0
5000 meters
	M40	Roy Fowler	United Kingdom/England	14:52.0
	M45	B. Jernhester	Sweden	16:25.0
	M50	Theo Orr	Australia	16:41.0
	M55	J. Gilmour	Australia	17:02.0
	M60	R. McMinnis	United Kingdom/England	18:26.4
	M65	T. Jensen	Sweden	19:04.2
	W30	Susie Buchanan	United States	18:48.4
	W40	Dorothy Stock	United States	19:26.4
		2. Toshiko D'Elia	United States	19:26.8
	W50	Anne McKenzie	South Africa	19:33.4
10000 meters
	M30	E. Fry	United States	30:42.2
	M40	Roy Fowler	United Kingdom/England	31:19.6
	M45	R. Franklin	United Kingdom/England	34:01.6
	M50	Theo Orr	Australia	34:09.0
		2. Jim O'Neil	United States	34:24.2
	M55	F.G. McGrath	Australia	34:05.4
	M60	R. McMinnus	United Kingdom/England	38:17.0
	M65	T. Jensen	Sweden	39:16.0
110 meters hurdles
	M40	Léopold Marien	Belgium	14.7 (+1.3) WR
	M45	Jack Greenwood	United States	15.6 (+1.4)
	M50	A. Findeli	France	15.9 (+0.6) WR
	M55	Burl Gist	United States	18.9 (+0.8)
	M60	G. Braceland	United States	20.2 (+1.2)
	M65	R. Lacey	United States	23.0 (+0.7)
400 meters hurdles
	M40	G. Shapiro	United Kingdom/England	1:00.0
	M45	Jack Greenwood	United States	57.8
	M50	Wal Sheppard	Australia	1:05.3 WR
	M55	Al Guidet	United States	1:07.9
	M60	G. Braceland	United States	1:12.9
	M65	R. Lacey	United States	1:24.5
3000 meters steeplechase
	M40	Hal Higdon	United States	9:16.6
	M45	B. Jernhester	Sweden	10:28.0
	M50	Theo Orr	Australia	10:36.6
	M55	O. Elvland	Sweden	11:43.6
	M60	Robert Boal	United States	12:33.6
	M65	Norm Bright	United States	12:24.8
High jump
	M40	S. Pettersson	Sweden	1.95
	M45	Ed Austin	United States	1.65
	M50	G.A. Bartlett	Australia	1.58
	M55	Burl Gist	United States	1.58
	M60	I. Hume	Canada	1.45
	M65	A. Reiser	West Germany	1.30
Pole vault
	M40	Walter Kostric	Canada	4.42
		2. Phil Mulkey	United States	3.90
		3. Dave Tork	United States	3.90
	M45	Roger Ruth	Canada	4.27
		2. Jerry Donley	United States	3.65
	M50	D. Brown	United States	3.25
		Unofficial Boo Morcom	United States	4.00
	M55	Jim Vernon	United States	3.40
	M60	I. Hume	Canada	2.80
	M65	R. MacConaghy	United States	2.45
Long jump
	M40	Dave Jackson	United States	6.37
	M45	Shirley Davidson	United States	6.52
	M50	Boo Morcom	United States	5.57
	M55	Gordon Farrell	United States	4.98
	M60	H. Schneider	West Germany	4.89
	M65	John Caruso	United States	3.93
Triple jump
	M40	Dave Jackson	United States	13.63
	M45	V. Guardia	Venezuela	12.76
	M50	G. Bartlett	Australia	11.00
	M55	Gordon Farrell	United States	10.79
	M60	I. Hume	Canada	10.45 WR
	M65	John Caruso	United States	8.57
Shot put
	M40	E. R. McComas	United States	16.23
	M45	J. Pavelich	Canada	12.53
	M50	Hermann Hombrecher	West Germany	17.56 WR
		3. Bill Bangert	United States	15.03
	M55	N. Heard	United States	13.59
	M60	Konstanty Maksimczyk	United Kingdom England	11.96
	M65	T. Resell	Norway	10.14
	M70	F. Posluschni	West Germany	12.15
Discus throw
	M40	E. R. McComas	United States	49.90
	M45	S. Duplessis	South Africa	45.02
	M50	Kauko Jouppila	Finland	51.62
		4. Bill Bangert	United States	41.48
	M55	T. McDermott	United States	40.78
		2. Dan Aldrich	United States	40.72
	M60	Konstanty Maksimczyk	United Kingdom England	42.76
	M65	Ken Carnine	United States	32.30
	M70	S. Herrmann	United States	33.08
Hammer throw
	M40	A. Payne	United Kingdom/England	63.22
	M45	T. Mullins	Australia	53.34
	M50	D. Vanhegan	United Kingdom/England	40.76
	M55	T. McDermott	United States	39.52
	M60	J. Fraser	United Kingdom/Scotland	44.50 WR
	M65	A. Reiser	West Germany	32.92
Javelin throw
	M40	B. Conley	United States	62.78
	M45	H. Werner	Canada	54.56
	M50	R. Mikelsons	Canada	47.34
	M55	B. Morales	United States	48.40
		2. Dan Aldrich	United States	45.24
	M60	Chuck McMahon	United States	37.80
	M65	R. MacConaghy	United States	34.58
		2. Ken Carnine	United States	32.30
10K Cross Country
	M40	Roy Fowler	United Kingdom/England	32:52
		3. Hal Higdon	United States	34:06
	M45	A. Taylor	Canada	34:50
	M50	M. VandeWattyne	Belgium	36:53
	M55	B. Borman	United States	39:10
	M60	R. McMinnis	United Kingdom/England	41:03
	M65	T. Jensen	Sweden	42:08
	M70	K. Carlsson	Norway	48:02
	W45	Dorothy Stock	United States	45:07
	W50	Ruth Anderson	United States	46:11
Marathon
	M40	E. Austin	United Kingdom/England	2:28:23
	M45	A. Walsham	United Kingdom/England	2:29:53
	M50	L. Carlsohn	Sweden	2:45:55
	M55	F. McGrath	Australia	2:40:44
	M60	Gordon Porteous	United Kingdom/Scotland	2:51:17 WR
	M65	E. Laiho	Finland	3:49:08
		3. Walt Stack	United States	3:53:13
	M70	G. Vang	Norway	4:02:55
