= 1964 International Cross Country Championships =

- Organisers: ICCU
- Edition: 51st
- Date: March 21
- Host city: Dublin, Ireland (Republic of Ireland)
- Venue: Leopardstown Racecourse
- Events: 2
- Distances: 7.3 mi (11.7 km) men 4.7 mi (7.6 km) junior men
- Participation: 113 athletes from 9 nations

The 1964 International Cross Country Championships was held in Dublin, Ireland, at the Leopardstown Racecourse on March 21, 1964. A report on the men's event was given in the Glasgow Herald.

Complete results for men, junior men, medallists and the results of British athletes were published.

== Medallists ==
Event	Gold		Silver		Bronze	
Individual
Men; 7.3 mi (11.8 km)	Francisco Aritmendi; Spain	40:33	Ron Hill; England	40:42	John Cooke; England	40:49
Junior Men; 4.7 mi (7.5 km)	Ian McCafferty; Scotland	24:20	David Walker; England	24:45	Don Collins; England	24:45
Team
Men	England	38	France	96	Morocco	149
Junior Men	England	16	Scotland	17	Morocco	22

== Individual Race Results ==
=== Men's (7.3 mi / 11.8 km) ===
Rank	Athlete	Nationality	Time
1st place, gold medalist(s)	Francisco Aritmendi	Spain	40:33
2nd place, silver medalist(s)	Ron Hill	England	40:42
3rd place, bronze medalist(s)	John Cooke	England	40:49
4	Gerry North	England	40:49
5	James Hogan	Ireland	40:56
6	Jean Vaillant	France	40:59
7	Bruce Tulloh	England	41:05
8	Basil Heatley	England	41:08
9	Abdeslem Bouchta	Morocco	41:13
10	Georges Fromont	Belgium	41:25
11	Mariano Haro	Spain	41:25
12	Yves Martinage	France	41:30
13	Fernando Aguilar	Spain	41:35
14	Mel Batty	England	41:38
15	Tom O'Riordan	Ireland	41:38
16	Guy Texereau	France	41:38
17	Ben Assou El Ghazi	Morocco	41:39
18	Alain Mimoun	France	41:40
19	Mohamed Ben Mohamed	Morocco	41:40
20	Mike Turner	England	41:50
21	Jean Fayolle	France	41:55
22	Dominic Keily	England	41:55
23	Lucien Rault	France	41:56
24	Joseph van Lent	Belgium	41:56
25	Hadj Ben Sitel	Morocco	42:04
26	Marcel Vandewattyne	Belgium	42:08
27	Hedwig Leenaert	Belgium	42:10
28	Bertie Messitt	Ireland	42:11
29	Andy Brown	Scotland	42:13
30	Jim Alder	Scotland	42:22
31	Dirk de Bruyn	Netherlands	42:23
32	Derek Graham	Ireland	42:31
33	Walter Vanhoutte	Belgium	42:35
34	Ahmed Oukbouch	Morocco	42:36
35	Leon Moreels	Belgium	42:39
36	Noel Tijou	France	42:44
37	Henk Snepvangers	Netherlands	42:45
38	Eddie Strong	England	42:54
39	Alasdair Heron	Scotland	43:00
40	Fergus Murray	Scotland	43:01
41	Lorenzo Gutiérrez	Spain	43:03
42	Frans van der Hoeven	Belgium	43:09
43	Mick Neville	Ireland	43:12
44	José Molíns	Spain	43:13
45	Mohamed Brahim	Morocco	43:13
46	Moha Ouali	Morocco	43:22
47	Manuel Alonso	Spain	43:27
48	James Johnstone	Scotland	43:28
49	Cees Clement	Netherlands	43:29
50	Mel Edwards	Scotland	43:30
51	Fons Veldhuyzen	Netherlands	43:35
52	Jacques van Eekelen	Netherlands	43:36
53	Alastair Wood	Scotland	43:46
54	Roger Petit	France	43:48
55	Jesús Fernández	Spain	43:51
56	José Fernández	Spain	43:52
57	Tom Cochrane	Scotland	43:55
58	Hedydd Davies	Wales	43:57
59	Frank McDermott	Ireland	44:02
60	Jean-Pierre Delloye	Belgium	44:07
61	Mohamed Ben Abdelsalem	Morocco	44:10
62	Iluminado Corcuera	Spain	44:15
63	Jan van Grinsven	Netherlands	44:17
64	Barry O'Gorman	Ireland	44:34
65	Pat Killeen	Ireland	44:42
66	Tom Edmunds	Wales	44:50
67	Bernard Maroquin	France	44:56
68	Lyn Bevan	Wales	45:00
69	Lachie Stewart	Scotland	45:09
70	Ron Franklin	Wales	45:50
71	Roger Harrison-Jones	Wales	46:03
72	Ken Flowers	Wales	46:31
73	Bill Stitfall	Wales	47:11
74	Bakir Benaissa	Morocco	47:35
75	Josephus Scheyen	Netherlands	47:43
76	Gerry Barrell	Wales	
—	Gaston Roelants	Belgium	DNF
—	Tony Harris	Wales	DNF
—	Colin Shillington	Ireland	DNF

=== Junior Men's (4.7 mi / 7.5 km) ===
Rank	Athlete	Nationality	Time
1st place, gold medalist(s)	Ian McCafferty	Scotland	24:20
2nd place, silver medalist(s)	David Walker	England	24:45
3rd place, bronze medalist(s)	Don Collins	England	24:45
4	Larbi Oukada	Morocco	25:04
5	Jean-Marie Rebry	Belgium	25:07
6	Robert Mack	Wales	25:08
7	Alec Brown	Scotland	25:12
8	Bouabib Chaoui	Morocco	25:13
9	Joseph Reilly	Scotland	25:18
10	Miloud Lhouceine	Morocco	25:20
11	Thomas O'Reilly	England	25:37
12	Jesús de Alba	Spain	25:44
13	Armand Dobbelaere	Belgium	25:48
14	Graham Taylor	England	25:53
15	Maurice de Roo	Belgium	25:58
16	Jorge González	Spain	25:59
17	Chris Loosley	Wales	26:05
18	John McGrow	England	26:15
19	Juan Hidalgo	Spain	26:21
20	Dehbi Elyazid	Morocco	26:23
21	Francisco Albert	Spain	26:26
22	Ian Young	Scotland	26:40
23	Marnix Stevens	Belgium	26:43
24	Mike Teer	Ireland	26:48
25	Will Francis	Wales	27:00
26	Tony Hopkins	Ireland	27:05
27	Eric Denduyver	Belgium	27:08
28	Jim Wright	Scotland	27:12
29	Clive Williams	Wales	27:26
30	B. Boyd	Ireland	27:34
31	Eric McMaster	Ireland	28:59
—	José Morera	Spain	DNF
—	Paul Lavelle	Ireland	DNF
—	Mehdi Jaouhar	Morocco	DNF

== Team Results ==
=== Men's ===
Rank	Country	Team	Points
1	England	Ron Hill; John Cooke; Gerry North; Bruce Tulloh; Basil Heatley; Mel Batty	38
2	France	Jean Vaillant; Yves Martinage; Guy Texereau; Alain Mimoun; Jean Fayolle; Lucien Rault	96
3	Morocco	Abdeslem Bouchta; Ben Assou El Ghazi; Mohamed Ben Mohamed; Hadj Ben Sitel; Ahmed Oukbouch; Mohamed Brahim	149
4	Belgium	Georges Fromont; Joseph van Lent; Marcel Vandewattyne; Hedwig Leenaert; Walter Vanhoutte; Leon Moreels	155
5	Spain	Francisco Aritmendi; Mariano Haro; Fernando Aguilar; Lorenzo Gutierrez; José Molíns; Manuel Alonso	157
6	Ireland	James Hogan; Tom O'Riordan; Bertie Messitt; Derek Graham; Mick Neville; Frank McDermott	182
7	Scotland	Andy Brown; Jim Alder; Alasdair Heron; Fergus Murray; James Johnstone; Mel Edwards	236
8	Netherlands	Dirk de Bruyn; Henk Snepvangers; Cees Clement; Fons Veldhuyzen; Jacques van Eekelen; Jan van Grinsven	283
9	Wales	Hedydd Davies; Tom Edmunds; Lyn Bevan; Ron Franklin; Roger Harrison-Jones; Ken Flowers	405

=== Junior Men's ===
Rank	Country	Team	Points
1	England	David Walker; Don Collins; Thomas O'Reilly	16
2	Scotland	Ian McCafferty; Alec Brown; Joseph Reilly	17
3	Morocco	Larbi Oukada; Bouabib Chaoui; Miloud Lhouceine	22
4	Belgium	Jean-Marie Rebry; Armand Dobbelaere; Maurice de Roo	33
5	Spain	Jesús de Alba; Jorge González; Juan Hidalgo	47
6	Wales	Robert Mack; Chris Loosley; Will Francis	48
7	Ireland	Mike Teer; Tony Hopkins; B. Boyd	80

== Participation ==
An unofficial count yields the participation of 113 athletes from 9 countries.

- Belgium (14)
- England (14)
- France (9)
- Ireland (14)
- Morocco (14)
- Netherlands (7)
- Scotland (14)
- Spain (14)
- Wales (13)

== See also ==
- 1964 in athletics (track and field)
