= Francisco Aritmendi =

Spanish long-distance runner (1938–2020)

Medal record

Men's athletics

Representing Spain

International Cross Country Championships
Gold medal – first place	1964 Dublin	Senior race
Silver medal – second place	1962 Sheffield	Senior team

Francisco Aritmendi Criado (17 or 19 September 1938 – 12 April 2020) was a Spanish long-distance runner who competed mainly in cross country running competitions. He was the gold medallist at the 1964 International Cross Country Championships. He was a six-time competitor at the competition and also shared in a team silver in 1962. However, his failure to finish at the 1963 race drew great criticism as Spain missed the team title as a result.

Aritmendi also competed on the track and represented Spain at the 1964 Tokyo Olympics in the 5000 meters. He was the Spanish record holder in that event, having become the first Spaniard under fourteen minutes with his best of 13:53.4 minutes. He was a three-time national champion: twice in cross country and once in the 10,000 meters. He ran during the amateur era of athletics and ultimately sold his historic International Cross Country gold medal due to poverty. His achievements were recognized nationally in 2007 when he was given the bronze Royal Order of Sports Merit.

== Career ==
=== Early life and career ===
Born during the height of the Spanish Civil War in Málaga del Fresno, a rural area near Madrid, he grew up in nearby Cogolludo. He took up running at school after being noted for his speed on the football pitch. In spite of his slight and small build (1.57 m), he performed well and quickly rose to win the national junior title in 1958, running with hemp shoes.

As he entered his twenties his running career was interrupted by military service and the passed from club to club, leaving Real Madrid in 1959 for SD Arenas. He began to make progress at the Spanish Cross Country Championships, coming 18th in 1961, then ninth in 1962. As a result of the latter performance he received his first international call-up for the 1962 International Cross Country Championships. At the competition, held in Sheffield, he finished 33rd and, as the sixth finisher in a Spanish team led by José Molíns, he shared in the team silver medals. He was signed up by FC Barcelona after this performance and began training under Gregorio Rojo.

=== Failure and victory ===
At the start of the 1963 season he impressed with a win at the Championat de Catalunya de Cross and second place to Mariano Haro at the national championships. There were high hopes for his performance at the 1963 International Cross Country Championships, which was held on home turf in San Sebastián. However, this would prove to be the most denigrated outing of his career. Failing to run an even-paced race, he ran too quickly towards the end, aiming for individual honor, and despite being around the tenth place on the final lap he dropped out of the race. This decision cost the host nation the team title – with Aritmendi's finish the team would have been ten points clear of the eventual winners Belgium, but instead ended fifth in the rankings as the team score was greatly increased by 38th placed Iluminado Corcuera instead. He was greatly criticized by the press and his teammates and Spain never did win the team International Cross title.

He completely turned around his fortunes in the 1964 event. He started by defending his Catalan title then claimed his first national title at the Spanish Cross Country Championships. The 1962 winner and 1963 runner-up Gaston Roelants was favourite for the 1964 International Cross Country Championships, but Aritmendi took to the front. The course in Dublin became increasingly muddy in the rain and Aritmendi persisted as Roelants dropped out and Englishmen Ron Hill and John Cooke fell back. Aritmendi completed a greatly unexpected upset by winning the gold medal, almost ten seconds ahead of the next finisher. He was the first Spaniard to win this title, the direct predecessor to the cross-country world championships which were established in 1973. As a result of his win he was invited to meet both Francisco Franco and the prince-in-exile Juan Carlos I of Spain.

Following his cross country win he began to receive support from the Spanish Athletics Federation and was assigned Kosta Olander as his coach. Aritmendi took to the track that summer and achieved a Spanish record of 13:53.4 minutes while finishing third at the ISTAF Berlin meeting, being the first Spaniard to complete the distance in under fourteen minutes. He did not match this performance later in the season, however, taking third at the Spanish Athletics Championships and being eliminated in fourth place of his heat at the 1964 Tokyo Olympics.

=== Later career ===
He broke another Spanish record in February 1965, running 8:22.2 minutes for the indoor 3000 meters. He also defended his title at the Spanish Cross Country Championships. He returned to defend his title, but was not successful, finishing in 23rd place, leading the Spanish men to fifth in the team race. In 1966 he enjoyed three high-profile wins in Spain, taking the Catalan cross country title, the national 10,000 metres title and the Jean Bouin race, but did not compete internationally. He had one more win at the Catalan race in 1967 and, after taking fifth at the nationals, finished 35th in a weakened Spanish team at the 1967 International Cross Country Championships.

His final international outing at the 1968 International Cross Country Championships saw him fall outside the top fifty runners in 52nd place. Having been an amateur, he ended his career in poverty and settled in Lasarte-Oria, the hometown of his wife, Conchita. The couple had four children, two girls, and two boys, and later moved to Guadalajara, Castilla-La Mancha. Still of humble means, Aritmendi suffered an injury and his family struggled. As a result, he sold his International Cross Country gold medal in order to buy food for his family.

In his later years, his achievements began to be recognized. He received the bronze Royal Order of Sports Merit in 2007. A street in Guadalajara was named in his honour – Paseo de Francisco Aritmendi – and in his hometown of Málaga del Fresno a sports centre was named after him.

Aritmendi died of pneumonia during the COVID-19 pandemic in Spain in April. At his death, he remained the only Spaniard to have won the world cross country title.

== International competitions ==
Year	Competition	Venue	Position	Event	Notes
1962	International Cross Country Championships	Sheffield, United Kingdom	33rd	Senior race	46:11
1962	International Cross Country Championships	Sheffield, United Kingdom	2nd	Senior team	115 pts
1963	International Cross Country Championships	San Sebastián, Spain	—	Senior race	DNF
1964	International Cross Country Championships	Dublin, Ireland	1st	Senior race	40:33
1964	International Cross Country Championships	Dublin, Ireland	5th	Senior team	157 pts
1964	Olympic Games	Tokyo, Japan	4th (q)	5000 m	14:05.0
1965	International Cross Country Championships	Ostend, Belgium	23rd	Senior race	37:51
1965	International Cross Country Championships	Ostend, Belgium	5th	Senior team	187 pts
1967	International Cross Country Championships	Barry, United Kingdom	35th	Senior race	37:44
1967	International Cross Country Championships	Barry, United Kingdom	7th	Senior team	256 pts
1968	International Cross Country Championships	Tunis, Tunisia	52nd	Senior race	37:38.4

== National titles ==
- Spanish Cross Country Championships
  - Long race: 1964, 1965
- Spanish Athletics Championships
  - 10,000 m: 1966
