= Jim Vernon =

Jim Vernon may refer to:

- Jim Vernon (footballer) (1942 – 2014), Scottish footballer
- Jim Vernon (philosopher), Canadian philosopher

== See also ==
- James Vernon (disambiguation)
