= 1962 European Athletics Championships – Men's 10,000 metres =

Men's 10,000 metres at the European Athletics Championships

The men's 10,000 metres at the 1962 European Athletics Championships was held in Belgrade, then Yugoslavia, at JNA Stadium on 12 September 1962.

== Medalists ==
Gold	Pyotr Bolotnikov; Soviet Union
Silver	Friedrich Janke; East Germany
Bronze	Roy Fowler; Great Britain

== Results ==
=== Final ===
12 September

Rank	Name	Nationality	Time	Notes
1st place, gold medalist(s)	Pyotr Bolotnikov	Soviet Union	28:54.0	CR
2nd place, silver medalist(s)	Friedrich Janke	East Germany	29:01.6	
3rd place, bronze medalist(s)	Roy Fowler	Great Britain	29:02.0	
4	Martin Hyman	Great Britain	29:02.0	
5	Robert Bogey	France	29:02.6	
6	Leonid Ivanov	Soviet Union	29:04.8	
7	Franc Červan	Yugoslavia	29:07.6	NR
8	Mike Bullivant	Great Britain	29:13.4	
9	Josef Tomáš	Czechoslovakia	29:22.4	
10	Hamida Addeche	France	29:22.8	
11	Constantin Grecescu	Romania	29:24.4	
12	Henri Clerckx	Belgium	29:31.4	
13	Siegfried Rothe	East Germany	29:33.8	
14	Antonio Ambu	Italy	29:34.6	
15	Şükrü Saban	Turkey	29:37.4	
16	Istvan Ivanovic	Yugoslavia	29:37.8	
17	Yuriy Nikitin	Soviet Union	29:49.4	
18	Peter Kubicki	West Germany	29:55.8	
19	Magnar Lundemo	Norway	29:59.4	
20	Janos Pinter	Hungary	30:20.0	
21	Jerzy Mathias	Poland	30:31.8	
22	Miklós Szabó	Hungary	31:13.4	
23	József Sütő	Hungary	31:39.6	
24	Jean Aniset	Luxembourg	31:44.8	
	Mariano Haro	Spain	DNF	
	Jim Hogan	Ireland	DNF	

== Participation ==
According to an unofficial count, 26 athletes from 17 countries participated in the event.

- Belgium (1)
- Czechoslovakia (1)
- East Germany (2)
- France (2)
- Hungary (3)
- Ireland (1)
- Italy (1)
- Luxembourg (1)
- Norway (1)
- Poland (1)
- Romania (1)
- Soviet Union (3)
- Spain (1)
- Turkey (1)
- Great Britain (3)
- West Germany (1)
- Yugoslavia (2)
