= Roy Fowler =

Roy Fowler may refer to:

- Roy Fowler (runner) (1934–2009), English distance runner
- Roy Fowler (Paralympian) (1920–2002), Australian Paralympic medallist
