= Jean Fayolle =

French long-distance runner

Medal record

Men's athletics

Representing France

Mediterranean Games
Silver medal – second place	1963 Naples	5000 m

International Cross Country Championships
Gold medal – first place	1965 Ostend	Senior race
Silver medal – second place	1965 Ostend	Senior team

Jean Fayolle (born 10 November 1937) is a French former long-distance runner who competed in track and cross country running. Born in Saint-Étienne, he became a member of ASPTT Paris and went on to represent France in the 5000 metres and 10,000 metres at the 1964 Tokyo Olympics. He was a four-time French national champion, winning titles in cross country, 3000 metres steeplechase, 5000 m and the 10,000 m in the 1960s.

His greatest achievement was a gold medal at the 1965 International Cross Country Championships. He led the French team to the silver medals alongside Michel Bernard and Michel Jazy. He was the last Frenchman to lift the title and his win marked the first French victory since the 1940s and 1950s wins by Alain Mimoun and Raphaël Pujazon. and He competed at the International Cross Country Championships four more times during the 1960s, including a team bronze with Bernard, Salah Beddiaf and Mimoun in 1961 and a team silver alongside Jean Vaillant, Yves Martinage, Mimoun and Lucien Rault in 1964. Despite his success in 1965, he did not feature in the top twenty of the race in his other outings.

Fayolle also competed at the 1963 Mediterranean Games and was a 5000 m silver medallist behind Mohammed Gammoudi. His personal bests on the track were 13.42.2 minutes for the 5000 m and 28.56.2 minutes for the 10,000 m. Both those times placed him in the top twenty of the seasonal rankings.

== International competitions ==
Year	Competition	Venue	Position	Event	Notes
1961	International Cross Country Championships	Nantes, France	36th	Senior race	48:28
1961	International Cross Country Championships	Nantes, France	3rd	Senior team	119 pts
1963	International Cross Country Championships	San Sebastián, Spain	54th	Senior race	40:11
1963	Mediterranean Games	Naples, Italy	2nd	5000 m	14:09.3
1964	International Cross Country Championships	Dublin, Ireland	21st	Senior race	41:55
1964	International Cross Country Championships	Dublin, Ireland	2nd	Senior team	96 pts
1964	Olympic Games	Tokyo, Japan	10th (q)	5000 m	14:44.6
1964	Olympic Games	Tokyo, Japan	13th	10,000 m	29:30.8
1965	International Cross Country Championships	Ostend, Belgium	1st	Senior race	36:48
1965	International Cross Country Championships	Ostend, Belgium	2nd	Senior team	55 pts
1966	International Cross Country Championships	Rabat, Morocco	60th	Senior race	?

== National titles ==
- French Athletics Championships
  - 3000 m steeplechase: 1964
  - 5000 m: 1964
  - 10,000 m: 1966
- French Cross Country Championships
  - Long race: 1964
