= Erik Gijselinck =

Belgian long-distance runner (born 1945)

Personal information
- Born: 27 November 1945 (age 80)

Sport
- Country: Belgium
- Sport: Athletics
- Event: Cross country running
Medal record
Men's athletics
Representing Belgium
World Cross Country Championships
| Gold medal – first place | 1973 Waregem | Senior team |
| Gold medal – first place | 1974 Monza | Senior team |
| Bronze medal – third place | 1975 Rabat | Senior team |
International Cross Country Championships
| Gold medal – first place | 1965 Ostend | Junior team |

Erik Gyselinck (born 27 November 1945) is a Belgian journalist and former long-distance runner. He was the team gold medalist in the men's race at the 1973 and 1974 World Cross Country Championships.

== Career ==
Gyselinck was a six-time Belgian Athletics national champion throughout his career and made three World Athletics Cross Country Championships teams, earning a medal at each appearance.

Gyselinck was an alternate selection for the U20 team at the 1964 International Cross Country Championships but did not ultimately compete. At the 1965 International Cross Country Championships, Gyselinck was 6th in the U20 men's race. As the third Belgian scorer, he helped his team win the gold medal.

At the 1970 Belgian Athletics Championships, Gyselinck won the 10,000 metres with a time of 29:45.4.

In 1972, Gyselinck won a 20 kilometres road race in Appelterre-Eichem, Belgium, running 1:02:00 hours. The following year, he ran for Belgium in the men's race at the inaugural World Cross Country Championships. He finished 19th, contributing to Beligum's gold medal as their fourth scorer.

Gyselinck was again selected to the Belgian team at the 1974 World Cross Country Championships. He finished 45th but still won the team gold medal as Belgium's sixth scorer.

In July 1975, Gyselinck was sixth in a 25 km race in Sombreffe, Belgium. He finished 62nd for Belgium at the 1975 World Cross Country Championships, contributing to their bronze medal as their final scorer.

Gyselinck later succeeded in the marathon. At the 1977 Belgian Athletics Championships, he became national marathon champion in 2:23:33 hours.

== Personal life ==
Gyselinck was born on 27 November 1945. He had a relative, Luc Gyselinck, who was also an athlete.

In 1980, Gyselinck founded the Alternatieve Atletiekvereniging, a sports association in Opwijk, Flemish Brabant, Belgium. It was initially a subsection of Vlierzele Sportief and later became part of Vilvoorde Atletiek Club.

Gyselinck later became a regional journalist for Het Nieuwsblad.
