= Science for Life Laboratory =

Swedish research center and laboratory

Coordinates: 59.35102°N 18.02088°E

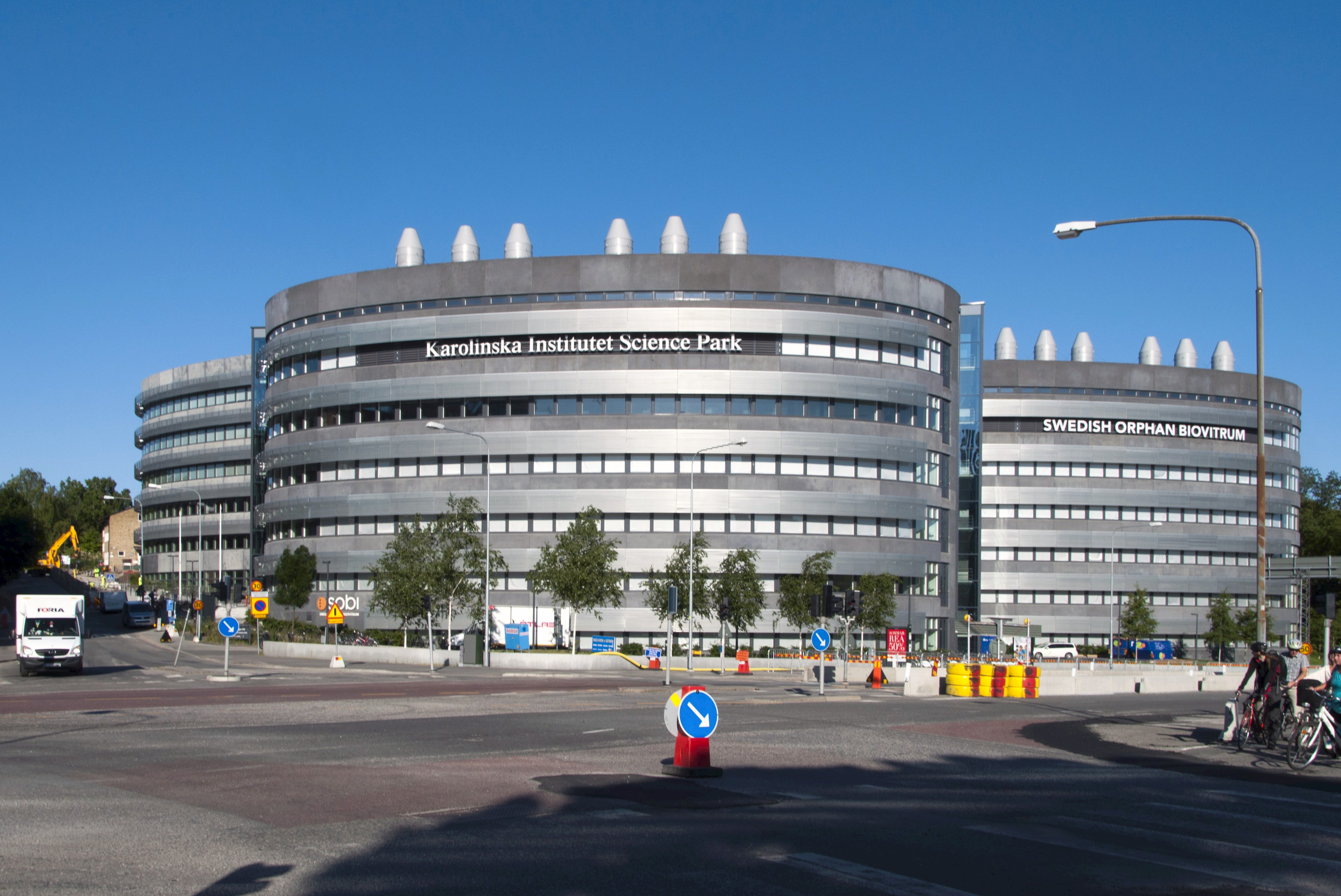
Science for Life Laboratory at Karolinska Institutet Campus Solna

SciLifeLab (Science for Life Laboratory) is a Swedish national center for large-scale research and one of the largest molecular biology research laboratories in Europe at the forefront of innovation in life sciences research, computational biology, bioinformatics, training and services in molecular biosciences with focus on health and environmental research. The center combines frontline technical expertise with advanced knowledge of translational medicine and molecular bioscience.

SciLifeLab is a national resource of unique technologies and expertise available to life scientists, closely intertwined with our community of researchers in areas such as biomedicine, ecology and evolution. We bring scientists together across traditional boundaries and foster collaborations with industry, health care, public research organizations and international partners. The National Genomics Infrastructure (NGI) hosted at SciLifeLab offers large-scale DNA sequence data generation and analysis.

SciLifeLab started out in 2010 as a joint effort between four universities: (Karolinska Institutet—the institution that awards the Nobel Prize in Physiology or Medicine, KTH Royal Institute of Technology, Stockholm University and Uppsala University). Today, SciLifeLab supports research activities across all major Swedish universities, with official SciLifeLab sites in Linköping, Lund, Gothenburg, Stockholm, Umeå and Uppsala.

SciLifeLab was established in 2010 and was appointed a national center in 2013 by the Swedish government. More than 200 elite research groups composed by 1,500 researchers are associated and work at SciLifeLab's two campuses in Stockholm and Uppsala. The Stockholm campus is surrounded by one of the largest hospitals in Europe both the old and the new Karolinska University Hospital buildings, the Karolinska Institutet and the European Centre for Disease Prevention and Control.

SciLifeLab is provided with SEK 150 million per year in state funds separate from other national and European grants and infrastructure support in the fields of drug discovery, drug development and fundamental research. Together with the prestigious American journal Science, SciLifeLab awards a young researcher prize. From 2018, SciLifeLab nominates Sjöstrand Lecturer in Structural Biology that would particularly spend time with students and postdocs during a visit to Sweden
