= Masters M65 1500 metres world record progression =

This is the progression of world record improvements of the 1500 metres M65 division of Masters athletics.

Key

Incomplete information Pending

Hand	Auto	Athlete	Nationality	Birthdate	Age	Location	Date	Ref
	4:39.15	Paul Forbes	Great Britain	20 November 1956	66 years, 250 days	Glasgow	28 July 2023	
	4:39.87	Simon Herlaar	Netherlands	28 June 1929	65 years, 18 days	Bedford	16 July 1994	
4:39.9		Derek Turnbull	New Zealand	5 December 1926	65 years, 100 days	Christchurch	14 March 1992	
	4:41.82	Jack Ryan	Australia	30 April 1922	65 years, 219 days	Melbourne	5 December 1987	
	4:49.16	John Gilmour	Australia	3 May 1919	66 years, 57 days	Rome	29 June 1985	
	4:50.6	Jack Stevens	Australia	23 November 1916	65 years, 355 days		13 November 1982	
4:59.1		William "Bill" Andberg	United States	8 June 1911	65 years, 26 days	Gresham	4 July 1976	
4:59.8		Norman Bright	United States	29 January 1910	65 years, 199 days	Toronto	16 August 1975	
