= Donald Macgregor (athlete) =

Scottish long-distance runner (1939–2020)

Personal information
- Nationality: British (Scottish)
- Born: 23 July 1939 Edinburgh, Scotland
- Died: 3 June 2020 (aged 80) St. Andrews, Scotland
- Height: 181 cm (5 ft 11 in)
- Weight: 62 kg (137 lb)

Sport
- Sport: Athletics
- Event: long distance / marathon
- Club: Edinburgh Southern Harriers

Donald Forbes Macgregor (23 July 1939 – 3 June 2020) was a Scottish long-distance runner, teacher and politician. He competed at the 1972 Summer Olympics in Munich, representing Great Britain in the men's marathon event, in which he finished in seventh position in 2:16:34. He also competed for Scotland at the Commonwealth Games in 1970 in Edinburgh and 1974 in Christchurch, New Zealand. He had a personal best time of 2:14:15.4.

== Biography ==
Macgregor was born in Edinburgh, was schooled at Daniel Stewart's school (now Stewart's Melville College) and studied at the University of St Andrews.

After winning the Scottish AAAs 6 and 10 mile titles he ran his first marathon in 1965 recording 2.22:24. he finished third behind fellow Scot Jim Alder in the marathon event at the 1967 AAA Championships.

Macgregor was chairman of the Royal Burgh of St Andrews Community Council until 2007, and served as a Liberal Democrat councillor on North East Fife District Council from 1988 to 1996. He was principal teacher of German in Madras College, St Andrews from 1974 until 1999, when he retired from full-time teaching. Until 2006 he taught French and German part-time in the Business School of the University of Abertay Dundee and was also a German-language tour guide.

He published a book of poetry, Stars and Spikes (2004, Nutwood Press), following in the footsteps of his father Forbes, who was a more prolific author and published among many other books with a Scottish theme, including the best-selling Greyfriars Bobby – the True Story at Last. More recently Donald was involved in research for John Bryant's books 3:59.4 (2004 – Random House) and The Marathon Makers (2008 – John Blake Publishing) and in photo caption translations for German books about the 2006 World Cup and 2008 Olympic Games. He did this and other translation work for the Olympic historian Volker Kluge (Berlin/Brandenburg).

In May 2007 he was elected to Fife Council as one of the ward members for East Neuk and Landward ward (Liberal Democrat) and forms part of the Fife Council coalition administration with the Scottish National Party.

Following his running career, he coached distance athletes as a member of Fife Athletic Club. Macgregor and his former wife had three children.

In 2010 he published an autobiography, Running My Life (Pinetree Press, St Andrews). In 2016, with co-author Tim Johnston, a fellow Olympian, he published His Own Man a biography of Dr Otto Peltzer, a German athlete (Pitch Publishers 2016).
