= James Vernon =

James Vernon may refer to:

- James Vernon (politician, born 1646) (1646–1727), English administrator and Whig politician
- James Vernon the Younger (1677–1756), British diplomat, civil servant, and briefly a Member of Parliament
- James Vernon (chemist) (1910–2000), Australian industrial chemist, Director of CSR (Colonial Sugar Refining Company) 1958–82
- James Vernon (historian), British historian

== See also ==
- Jim Vernon
