= Roy Fowler (runner) =

English long-distance runner

Personal information
- Nationality: British (English)
- Born: 26 March 1934 Longsdon, Staffordshire, England
- Died: 27 June 2009 (aged 75)

Sport
- Sport: Athletics
- Event: long distance
- Club: Staffs and Stone AC
Medal record
Men's athletics
Representing Great Britain
European Athletics Championships
Bronze medal – third place	1962 Belgrade	10,000 m
Representing England
International Cross Country Championships
Gold medal – first place	1963 San Sebastián	Senior race
Bronze medal – third place	1968 Tunis	Senior race
Gold medal – first place	1966 Rabat	Senior team
Gold medal – first place	1968 Tunis	Senior team
Silver medal – second place	1961 Nantes	Senior team
Bronze medal – third place	1963 San Sebastián	Senior team

Henry Roy Fowler (26 March 1934 – 27 June 2009) was an English long-distance runner who competed mainly in track and cross country running competition. His greatest achievement was a gold medal at the International Cross Country Championships in 1963. He won five other medals at that competition, including an individual bronze in 1968 and team gold medals with England in 1966 and 1968.

Fowler's sole high level track medal was a bronze in the 10,000 metres at the 1962 European Athletics Championships. He had won that event at the AAA Championships that year in a Commonwealth record time of 27:49.8 minutes. He also represented England at the 1962 British Empire and Commonwealth Games and was a four-time champion at the World Masters Athletics Championships in the over-40s category.

== Biography ==
=== Early life and career ===
Fowler was born in Longsdon near Leek, Staffordshire. He took up running in his youth after suffering from pneumonia, to improve his health. He performed well in running at school, winning his first race aged 14. He was also a keen footballer and had a trial for Manchester United, though this was unsuccessful. He joined the local athletics club and as he grew older he joined the national level club Stone and District AC (now North Staffs and Stone Harriers). He gained the nickname the "Red Fox" due to his speed at cross country and his red hair. He worked as a painter and decorator in his teens and early twenties, as well as a stint with the army due to national service in the late 1950s.

He began to make his impact on the regional scene in his mid-twenties. He won the 3-mile track title at the Midland Counties Championships in 1960 then was victorious at the 1961 Midland Counties Cross Country Championships. He won go on to win the Midland cross country title once more, in 1968, and took two more counties track titles: the 3 miles in 1963 and the six miles in 1968. A win at the 1961 Inter-Counties Cross Country Championships, achieved in heavy snow while he had been off work due to an illness, brought him to greater attention as he beat British record holder Bruce Tulloh among others.

=== International and national career ===
His international career began in 1961 and would eventually take in 38 national selections for England. He won his first medal at the 1961 International Cross Country Championships, placing eighth to bring the English men to the silver medals alongside medallists Basil Heatley and Martin Hyman. He focused on the track in 1962 and came away with his first individual medal at the 1962 European Athletics Championships, securing the bronze medal in the 10,000 metres behind Soviet runner Pyotr Bolotnikov, in spite of a groin injury. Fowler was only the second British man to win a European medal at that distance, after Frank Sando. He made an appearance over the same distance at the British Empire and Commonwealth Games, but was far off the podium in eighth place. Amongst other local outings, he won the Rivington Pike fell race.

His most successful season came in 1963. At the 1963 International Cross Country Championships in San Sebastián, Spain, he surprised by topping the field, beating the much more established Gaston Roelants by over ten seconds. Roelants (the defending champion and later European and Olympic champion) challenged Fowler to a re-match for £3000 (a very large sum for the period), but he refused as he wished to preserve his amateur status for the 1964 Tokyo Olympics. This ultimately was not to occur, however, as persistent pain in his shins was diagnosed as hairline fractures and he was absent from the sport for a year and a half.

After returning from his injury he made three further top level international appearances and these were successful ones. After winning the Cross Internacional Juan Muguerza meet, he was fourth at the 1966 International Cross Country Championships in Rabat, leading the English men to the team gold with the help of Ron Hill, Tim Johnston and Mike Freary. At the European Champion Clubs Cup Cross Country in 1967 he was runner-up to old rival Roelants, but this was enough bring North Staffs & Stone Harriers to its first (and thus far only) ever team title at the competition.

Nationally, his greatest achievement was becoming the British 6 miles champion at the 1962 AAA Championships. He won this title in a time of 27:49.8 minutes, which was a British and Commonwealth record at the time. Despite his international success in cross country, he never won at the English Cross Country Championships, having only had two top three finishes with second to Basil Heatley in 1963 and third behind Ron Hill and Mike Freary in 1968. In his last senior cross country appearance, aged 33, he won a bronze medal at the 1968 International Cross Country Championships. Tunisia's Mohamed Gammoudi topped the rankings but the Englishmen, led by Hill in second and Fowler in third, again topped the team rankings.

=== Later career and life ===
He continued to compete into his later years and was a leading athlete during the development of masters athletics. At the 1975 World Association of Veteran Athletes Championships – the first edition of that competition – he took a long-distance triple in the men's over 40 category, winning 5000 m, 10,000 m and cross country events. He returned for the 1977 edition and defended his 10,000 m title but was beaten into second place by Gaston Roelants (another former world cross country champion) in the other two disciplines.

Fowler retired due to injury in his mid-forties but continued to work in sport, including fitness work at Stoke City F.C. for England goalkeeper Gordon Banks among others, and athletics coaching, including Mark Roberts (multiple winner of the Potteries Marathon). John Bale and Malcolm Henson wrote a biography of Fowler, published in 2006, called A Fighter Second To None. He was also the subject of a short documentary film, Red Fox: The Life of Roy Fowler, released in 2007. Fowler died of cancer in 2009, leaving his second wife, Elizabeth, two sons, a daughter and a stepdaughter.

== International competitions ==
Year	Competition	Venue	Position	Event	Notes
1961	International Cross Country Championships	Nantes, France	8th	Senior race	46:27
1961	International Cross Country Championships	Nantes, France	2nd	Senior team	71 pts
1962	European Championships	Belgrade, Yugoslavia	3rd	10,000 m	29:02.0
1962	British Empire and Commonwealth Games	Perth, Western Australia	8th	10,000 m	29:44.0
1963	International Cross Country Championships	San Sebastián, Spain	1st	Senior race	37:19.7
1963	International Cross Country Championships	San Sebastián, Spain	3rd	Senior team	113 pts
1966	International Cross Country Championships	Rabat, Morocco	4th	Senior race	36:41
1966	International Cross Country Championships	Rabat, Morocco	1st	Senior team	59 pts
1968	International Cross Country Championships	Tunis, Tunisia	3rd	Senior race	35:31.8
1968	International Cross Country Championships	Tunis, Tunisia	1st	Senior team	58 pts
1975	World Veteran Championships	Toronto, Canada	1st	5000 m M40	14:52.0
1975	World Veteran Championships	Toronto, Canada	1st	10,000 m M40	31:19.6
1975	World Veteran Championships	Toronto, Canada	1st	Cross country M40	32:51
1977	World Veteran Championships	Gothenburg, Sweden	2nd	5000 m M40	14:29.4
1977	World Veteran Championships	Gothenburg, Sweden	1st	10,000 m M40	31:45.7
1977	World Veteran Championships	Gothenburg, Sweden	2nd	Cross country M40	29:16

== National titles ==
- AAA Championships
  - 6 miles: 1962
