= Pyotr Bolotnikov =

Soviet long-distance runner

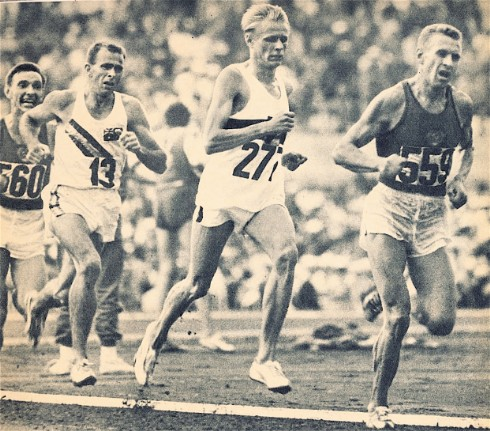
- Pyotr Bolotnikov, 10000 meters final, 1960 Summer Olympics Rome

Personal information
- Nationality: Soviet; Russian
- Born: March 8, 1930 Zinovkino, Krasnoslobodsky District, USSR
- Died: December 20, 2013 (aged 83) Krasnoslobodsk, Republic of Mordovia, Russia

Sport
- Sport: Track
- Events: 5000 meters, 10,000 meters

Achievements and titles
- Personal bests: 5000 meters: 13:38.2; 10,000 meters: 28:18.1
Medal record
Men's athletics
Representing Soviet Union
Olympic Games
Gold medal – first place	1960 Rome	10,000 metres
European Championships
Gold medal – first place	1962 Belgrade	10,000 metres
Bronze medal – third place	1962 Belgrade	5000 metres

Pyotr Grigoryevich Bolotnikov (Russian: Пётр Григо́рьевич Боло́тников; 8 March 1930 – 20 December 2013) was a Soviet Track and field athlete who competed mainly in long-distance running events. He was the winner of the 10,000 metres at the 1960 Summer Olympics.

Born in Zinovkino, Krasnoslobodsky District, Mordovian ASSR (now the Republic of Mordovia), Bolotnikov started athletics only at age twenty, when he joined the Soviet Army. He trained at VSS Spartak, coached by Grigory Nikiforov.

Bolotnikov won his first national championship title in 10,000 m in 1957, when he surprisingly beat the great Vladimir Kuts in a finishing straight by 0.2 seconds. He became the double Soviet champion in 5000 m and 10,000 m from 1958 to 1962. He also won the national 10,000 m title in 1964 and national cross country title in 1958. In 1959 he became the Honoured Master of Sports of the USSR.

Bolotnikov participated already at the 1956 Summer Olympics, but without any success. At the Rome Olympics in 1960, Bolotnikov controlled the 10,000 m race from the start to end, beating the main favourites Hans Grodotzki from Germany and Murray Halberg from New Zealand by five seconds. On 5 October 1960, in Kiev, Bolotnikov lowered the 10,000 metres world record by almost twelve seconds to 28:18.8.

Just two weeks before the 1962 European Championships in Belgrade, on 11 August 1962 in Moscow, Bolotnikov lowered his own 10,000 m world record by 0.6 seconds to 28:18.2, thus becoming the main favourite at long distances at the Championships. He easily won the 10,000 m run, but was surprisingly beaten to third in 5,000 m.

After the unsuccessful 1964 Summer Olympics, Bolotnikov decided to retire from athletics in 1965. He received the Order of Lenin in 1960.

Bolotnikov died on 20 December 2013, at the age of 83.

Records
Preceded by (Soviet Union) Vladimir Kuts	Men's 10,000 m World Record Holder; 15 October 1960 – 18 December 1963	Succeeded by (Australia) Ron Clarke
Sporting positions
Preceded by (West Germany) Friedrich Janke	Men's 5000 m Best Year Performance; 1960	Succeeded by (New Zealand) Murray Halberg
Preceded by (New Zealand) Murray Halberg	Men's 5000 m Best Year Performance; 1963	Succeeded by (United States) Bob Schul
