= Fritiof S. Sjöstrand =

Swedish physician and histologist

- Born: 5 November 1912; Stockholm, Sweden
- Died: 6 April 2011 (aged 98); Los Angeles, California, United States
- Awards: Paul Ehrlich and Ludwig Darmstaedter Prize (1971)
- Scientific career
- Fields: histology

Fritiof Stig Sjöstrand (5 November 1912 – 6 April 2011) was a Swedish physician and histologist born in Stockholm. He started his medical education at Karolinska Institutet in 1933, where he received his Ph.D. Karolinska Institutet in 1944. Sjöstrand worked as an assistant at the department of pharmacology, where he first had used polarization microscopy, he first heard about the new method of electron microscopy in 1938, within which he would become a pioneer. Manne Siegbahn at the Nobel Institute for Physics had planned to build an electron microscope in Sweden, and Sjöstrand got involved in the project to explore its use in medical research. The main challenge was to produce sufficiently thin samples, and Sjöstrand's method for producing ultrathin tissue samples was published in Nature in 1943. However, it seemed that research based on electron microscopy would be too time-consuming for a Ph.D. thesis, so his 1944 thesis was based on fluorescence spectroscopy. In 1947-1948, he received a scholarship to further study electron microscopy at Massachusetts Institute of Technology's Department of Biology. Back in Sweden, he received funding to build up an electron microscopy research laboratory. In 1959, Sjöstrand was both offered a position as professor of histology at Karolinska Institutet, and as professor at University of California, Los Angeles (UCLA). He chose UCLA, because conditions for research and funding were better there.

Sjöstrand founded the Journal of Ultrastructure Research in 1957. Since 1990, the journal has been called the Journal of Structural Biology.

Sjöstrand died on 6 April 2011, at the age of 98.

In the recognition of Fritiof Sjöstrand's contribution to the development of electron microscopy, the Annual Sjöstrand Lecture series was set up in 2018 in Sweden. A holder of the lectureship also spends time with students and postdocs at SciLifeLab. The Inaugural Lecture was given by Venki Ramakrishnan at the Karolinska Institute. The 2019 lecture was given by Jennifer Doudna. The 2021 lecture will be given by Jennifer Lippincott-Schwartz.
