= Jan Barnard =

South African long-distance runner (1929–2012)

Personal information
- Nationality: South African
- Born: 21 October 1929 Lichtenburg, South Africa
- Died: 21 October 2012 (aged 83) Pretoria, South Africa

Sport
- Sport: Long-distance running
- Event: Marathon

Johannes Hendrikus "Jan" Barnard (21 October 1929 – 21 October 2012) was a South African long-distance runner. He competed in the marathon at the 1956 Summer Olympics. He won a bronze medal in the marathon at the 1954 British Empire and Commonwealth Games and a silver medal in 1958.
