= Aad Steylen =

Dutch long-distance runner

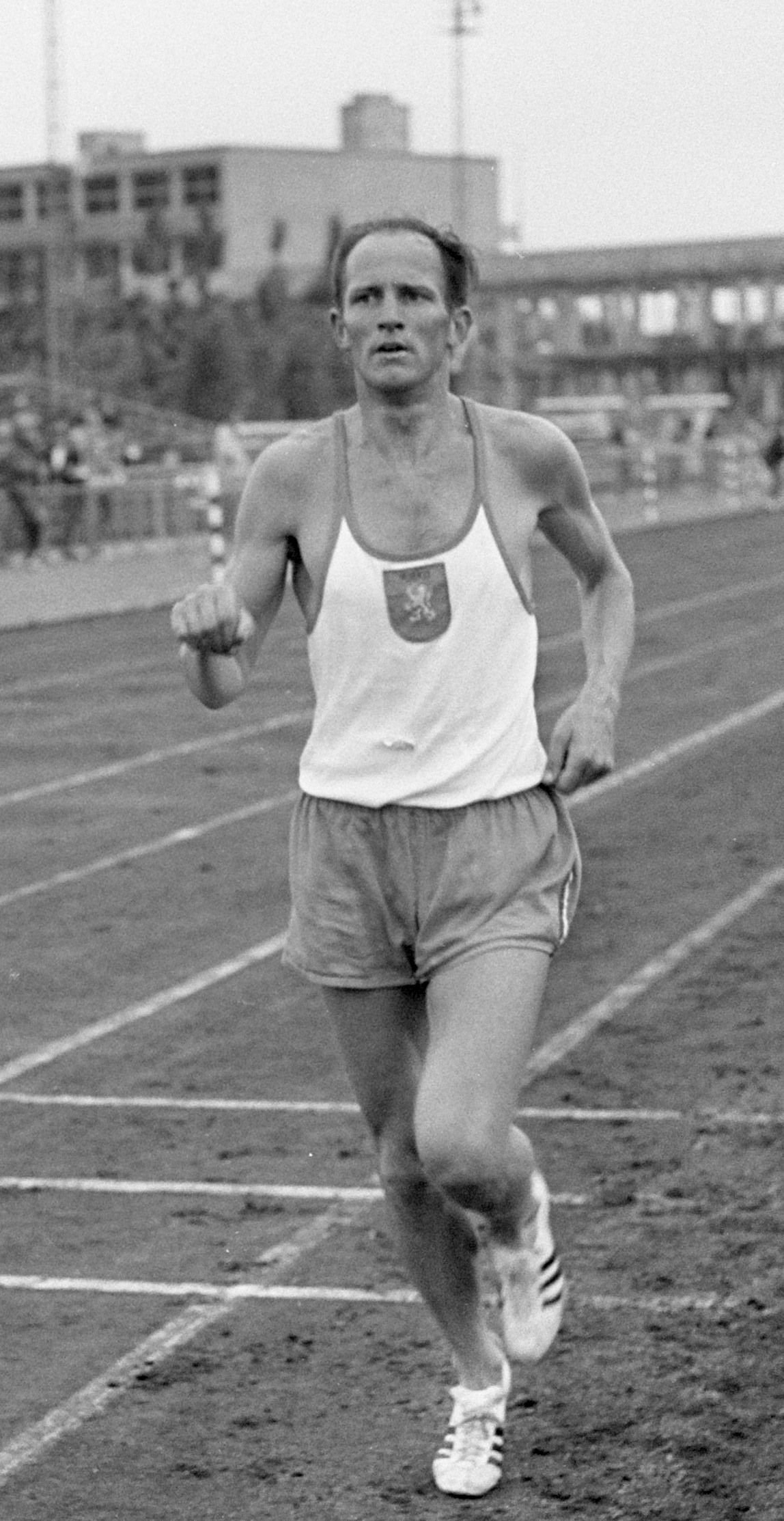
- Aad Steylen in 1967

Personal information
- Born: 1 August 1935 (age 90) Schiebroek, the Netherlands
- Height: 1.84 m (6 ft 0 in)
- Weight: 70 kg (150 lb)

Sport
- Sport: Long-distance running
- Club: ASV, Eibergen

Achievements and titles
- Olympic finals: 1976

Adrianus Johannes Steylen (born 1 August 1935) is a Dutch former long-distance runner. He is a five times Dutch marathon champion, who enhanced the Dutch record five times. He was also a four-time winner of the 25-kilometre race and a one-time champion of the 800 metres distance at the Dutch Championships. In 1968, he represented his country in the 1968 Summer Olympics in Mexico. In the 1970s he worked as national coach for the Royal Dutch Athletic Union (KNAU).

From the age of 16 Steylen was active in track and field events, especially the field events belonging to the decathlon. In his junior time, he became Dutch javelin throw champion and won a silver medal in the pole vault event. Afterwards he specialised in the middle distance running events and obtained his first success when becoming Dutch 800 metres champion in 1961.

As a result of his regular endurance training sessions, Steylen started to give preference to long distance running. He decided to try to run the marathon, but his first acquaintance with this event ended up in a disappointment, as he finished the race in 2 hours and 45 minutes. Then he decided to specialise and became a five times Dutch champion. He was also the first Dutchman to break through the 2 hours and 20 minutes barrier: on 12 May 1968 he finished a marathon in Husum in 2:19:07.1, improving on his former national record by more than three minutes. That same year he participated in the olympic marathon in Mexico City, finishing 27th in 2:37:42, being the 11th European.

Steylen participated in the Berlin Marathon of 2003 at age 68, finishing in only three hours and 15 minutes.
