= Tim Johnston (runner) =

British long-distance runner (1941–2021)

Personal information
- Nationality: British (English)
- Born: 11 March 1941 Oxford, England
- Died: 9 October 2021 (aged 80) The Hague, Netherlands
- Height: 175 cm (5 ft 9 in)
- Weight: 61 kg (134 lb)

Sport
- Sport: Athletics
- Event: Long-distance running
- Club: Portsmouth AC; Cambridge University AC; Achilles Club

Timothy Frederick Kembal Johnston (11 March 1941 – 9 October 2021) was a British long-distance runner. He competed at the 1968 Summer Olympics. In 1968, Johnston was a double British national champion and he won the silver medal in the men's event at the 1967 International Cross Country Championships. During the 1960s, Johnston set a British and World record in distance running.

== Biography ==
Johnston was born in Oxford, England in 1941. In the 1950s, he attended Bedales School in Hampshire, before going to Trinity College, Cambridge. At Bedales, Johnston became a two-time Hampshire Schools mile champion. While at Trinity College, he became a cross-country runner.

Johnston finished third behind Maurice Herriott in the steeplechase event at the 1964 AAA Championships.

In 1968, he became the British 6 miles champion and the British marathon champion, after winning the British AAA Championships titles at the 1968 AAA Championships, including setting a British record in the six mile event. Later that year, at the 1968 Olympic Games in Mexico City, he represented Great Britain in the men's marathon, where he finished in eighth place. Also during the 1960s, Johnston won two Inter-Counties crowns and three Southern titles. Johnston also tried to compete at the 1972 Summer Olympics in Munich, but suffered from an Achilles tendon injury.

Outside of sport, Johnston was also a solicitor and worked at the European Economic Community as a lawyer-linguist. He later went to work at the International Court of Justice in The Hague as a legal translator.

In 2016, Johnston wrote a biography on Otto Peltzer, a German middle distance runner, which was illustrated by fellow Olympian Donald Macgregor.
