= Eddy Van Butsele =

Belgian middle-distance runner

Personal information
- Nationality: Belgian
- Born: 13 July 1947 (age 79)

Sport
- Sport: Middle-distance running
- Event: Steeplechase

Eddy Van Butsele (born 13 July 1947) is a Belgian middle-distance runner. He competed in the men's 3000 metres steeplechase at the 1968 Summer Olympics.
