= Jim Vernon (philosopher) =

Canadian philosopher

Education
- Education: University of Guelph (MA, PhD), McMaster University (HBA)

Philosophical work
- Era: 21st-century philosophy
- Region: Western philosophy
- School: Continental
- Institutions: York University
- Main interests: Philosophy , Race and Racism, 19th and 20th Century Continental Philosophy, esp. Hegel and post-war French Philosophy, Post-Structuralism, Emancipatory Politics

Jim Vernon is a Canadian philosopher and Professor of Philosophy at York University. He is known for his work on Hegelian philosophy.

== Books ==
- Sampling, Biting, and The Postmodern Subversion of Hip Hop (Palgrave MacMillan, 2021)
- Hip Hop, Hegel, and The Art of Emancipation: Let’s Get Free (Palgrave MacMillan, 2018)
- Hegel and Badiou: Infinity, Dialectics, Subjectivity: collection of essays, co-edited with Antonio Calcagno (Lexington Books, 2015)
- Intensities and Lines of Flight: Deleuze and Guattari and the Arts, co-edited with Antonio Calcagno and Steve Lofts (Rowman and Littlefield, 2014)
- Hegel and Deleuze: Together Again for the First Time, co-edited with Karen Houle (Northwestern University Press, 2013).
- Hegel’s Philosophy of Language (London: Continuum Books, 2007)
