= Journal of Structural Biology =

- Discipline: Structural biology
- Language: English
- Edited by: A. C. Steven, A. Lupas

Publication details
- Former name(s): Journal of Ultrastructure and Molecular Structure Research, Journal of Ultrastructure Research
- History: 1957-present
- Publisher: Elsevier
- Frequency: Monthly
- Impact factor: 3.489 (2017)

Standard abbreviations
- ISO 4: J. Struct. Biol.

Indexing
- ISSN: 1047-8477
- OCLC no.: 36946295

Links
- Journal homepage; Online access

The Journal of Structural Biology is a peer-reviewed scientific journal concerning the structural analysis of biological materials at all levels of organization and the functional consequences of such observations. The editors-in-chief are A.C. Steven (Silver Spring, MD, United States) and Wolfgang Baumeister (Max-Planck-Institute of Biochemistry).

According to the Journal Citation Reports, the journal has a 2014 impact factor of 3.231, ranking it 109th out of 289 journals in the category "Biochemistry & Molecular Biology", 23rd out of 73 journals in the category "Biophysics", and 98th out of 184 journals in the category "Cell Biology".
