= Friedrich Janke =

German long-distance runner

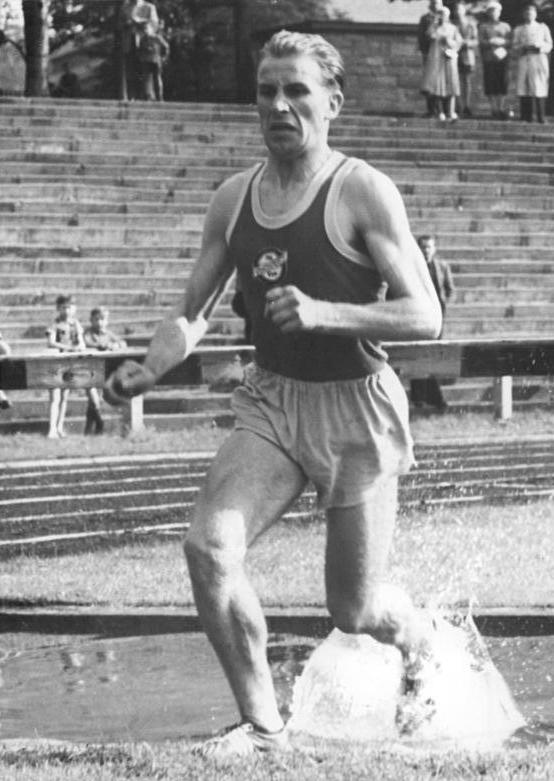
- Friedrich Janke in 1956

Personal information
- Nationality: German
- Born: 19 April 1931 (age 95)

Sport
- Sport: Long-distance running
- Event: 5000 metres
Medal record
Men's athletics
Representing East Germany
European Championships
| Silver medal – second place | 1962 Belgrade | 10,000 m |

Friedrich Janke (born 19 April 1931) is a German long-distance runner. He competed in the 5000 metres at the 1956 Summer Olympics and the 1960 Summer Olympics.
