= Norm Bright =

American runner (1910–1996)

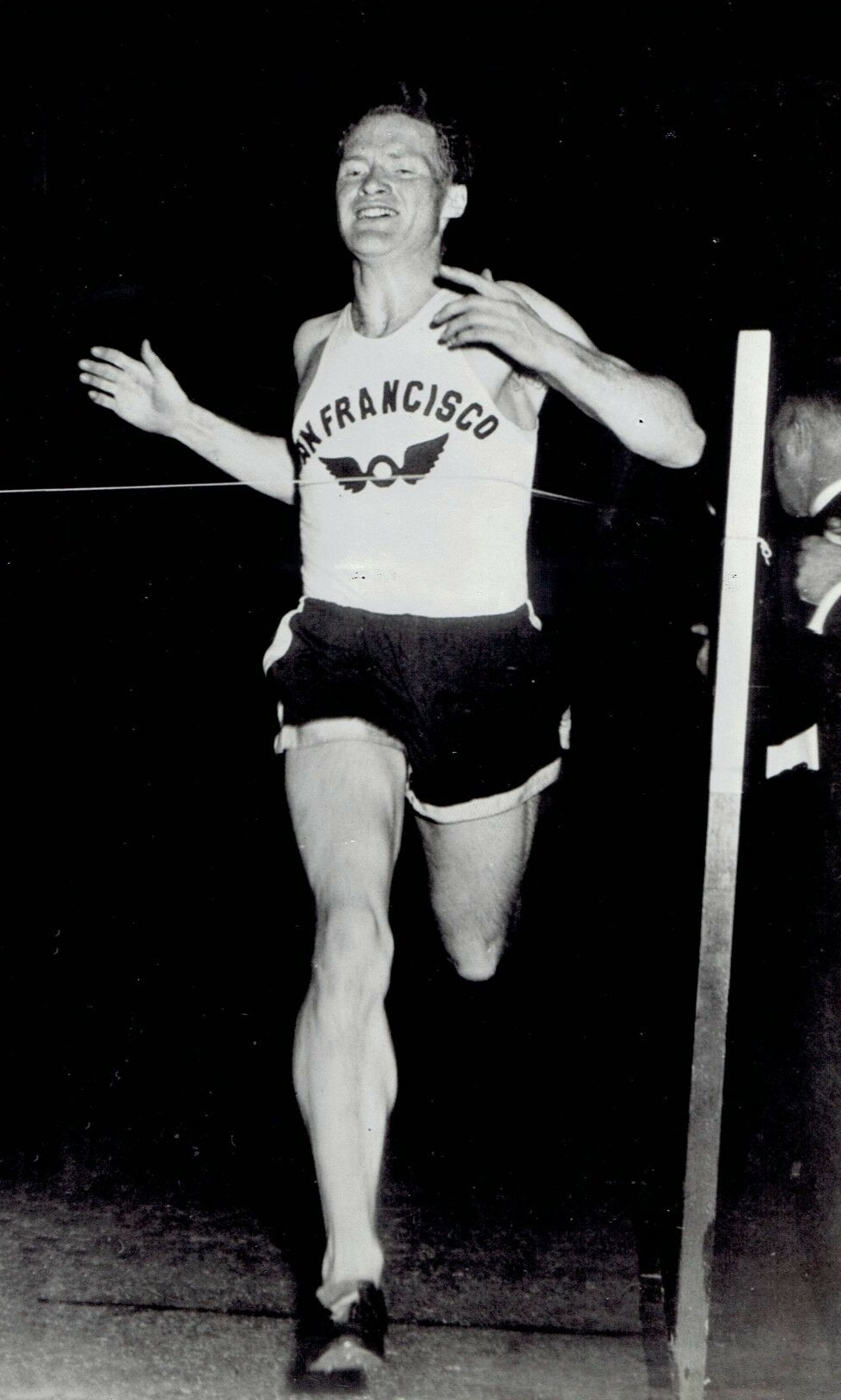
- Bright in 1946

Personal information
- Born: January 29, 1910 Mossyrock, Washington, U.S.
- Died: August 29, 1996 (aged 86) Seattle, U.S.

Sport
- Sport: Athletics
- Event: 800–10,000 m

Achievements and titles
- Personal bests: 1500 m – 3:56.6 (1935) mile – 4:14.5 (1935); 5000 m – 14:39.4 (1938); 10,000 m – 33:53.0 (1944)

Bright in 1983

Norman Bright (January 29, 1910 – August 29, 1996) was an American runner, mountaineer, and teacher. Bright once held the American record in the two-mile run.

== Biography ==
Bright was the son of a school principal and a teacher. Born in Mossyrock, Washington, he was one of eleven children. Bright's mother reportedly rubbed olive oil into his legs as an infant when she was told by a doctor that her son was not "moving and working his muscles enough". Bright attended Western Washington University where he earned a teaching degree, Stanford University where he earned a bachelor's degree, and Miami University where he earned a master's degree in counseling.

During World War II, Bright served in the United States Army. He was initially rejected due to a slow pulse, however, he went to another enlistment center after running three miles to raise his heart rate. In 1945, Bright married Franca Fiorentino whom he had met in New York City. The couple had one daughter (Juliana), and later divorced. Bright moved to Seattle in 1966 and worked for the Seattle School District as a psychologist.

Bright participated in the Olympic trials in 1936, but failed to qualify, finishing fifth in the 5,000 m after twisting an ankle and collapsing in the 100 degree temperatures that had a third of the field unable to finish the race. He was the winner of the 1937 Bay to Breakers, setting the course record as the first man to run under 40 minutes. That same year, he set a course record of 47:22 at the Dipsea Race, but finished second due to the impairing nature of the event. Thirty-three years later in 1970, he won the event. The Norman Bright Award is given for "Extraordinary Effort in the Dipsea".

In the mid-1960s, Bright began to slowly lose his eyesight due to atrophy of the optic nerves. In 1978, he was struck by a bus, breaking numerous bones; his vision faded rapidly after that. He needed a "guide," to keep him on course. Rules have been developed to ensure blind athletes do not gain an advantage when led in a race.

In 1975 he set the M65 World record over 800 m and 1500 m distances while winning at the first Association of Veteran Athletes (WAVA) World Championships in Toronto, Ontario, Canada. He was the first 65-year-old under 5 minutes in the 1500 m. He also won the steeplechase at the same meet.

In 1976 he ran the Bay to Breakers with the guide (39 years after his victory in the event). Later that year he set the M65 American record in the 10,000 m that still stands.

Bright was also a mountaineer reported to have climbed every major peak in the United States.

Bright is mentioned in Laura Hillenbrand's best-selling biography about Louis Zamperini, Unbroken: A World War II Story of Survival, Resilience, and Redemption. Bright appeared on the cover of Runners World in September 1974, running a steeplechase at the age of 64 and nearly blind.

Bright was a member of San Francisco's Olympic Club.

In 2000 he was elected into the USATF Masters Hall of Fame.

Bright died in Seattle due to complications from pneumonia and cancer.

== Bibliography ==
- Olson, Leonard T., Masters Track and Field: A History, McFarland & Co., North Carolina, 2001. ISBN 0-7864-0889-8
- Two Mile Record, 1935, 9m13.2s: "Those Were the Days, Today in History - July 9". Archived from the original on July 16, 2006.
- "WESTERN ALL-CENTURY TRACK AND FIELD TEAMS" (PDF). Graphics.fansonly.com. Archived from the original (PDF) on March 3, 2016.
- Wood, Michael & Coombs, Colby, Alaska: A Climbing Guide, The Mountaineers Books, 2001. ISBN 0-89886-724-X
