= Peter Welsh (athlete) =

New Zealand steeplechase runner

Personal information
- Born: 16 July 1943 (age 82)
Medal record
Men's Athletics
Representing New Zealand
Commonwealth Games
Gold medal – first place	1966 Kingston	3000m Steeplechase

Robert Peter Welsh (born 16 July 1943, in Dunedin, Otago) is a former 3000 meters steeplechase runner from New Zealand. In 1966 he competed for his native country at the Commonwealth Games in Kingston, Jamaica, winning the gold medal in the 3000m steeplechase event. He also competed at the 1968 Summer Olympics but was eliminated in the heats finishing 6th at Mexico City.
