= Martin Hyman =

British long-distance runner (1933–2021)

Personal information
- Nationality: British (English)
- Born: 3 July 1933 Southampton, England
- Died: 3 April 2021 (aged 87) Livingston, West Lothian, Scotland
- Height: 178 cm (5 ft 10 in)
- Weight: 66 kg (146 lb)

Sport
- Sport: Athletics
- Event: Long-distance running
- Club: Portsmouth AC

Martin Hyman (3 July 1933 – 3 April 2021) was a British long-distance runner who competed at the 1960 Summer Olympics.

== Biography ==
Hyman never had a coach; he educated himself in training theories, working with his Portsmouth team-mate Bruce Tulloh. Since Hyman reserved only one hour in his day for training (except for Sundays when he often ran for 2 hours or more), he devised sessions that used the sixty minutes effectively. He regularly ran around 50 miles a week and never went over 70. More than most successful running careers, Hyman's was based on intelligence and determination. Running became an outlet for his driven personality, and he had the self-discipline to get the most out of himself while at the same time living a full life as a teacher and family man.

Hyman competed in the men's 10,000 metres at the 1960 Olympic Games in Rome. He also represented the England athletics team in the 6 miles race at the 1958 British Empire and Commonwealth Games in Cardiff, Wales. Four years later, he competed in both the 6 miles race and the marathon at the 1962 British Empire and Commonwealth Games in Perth, Western Australia.

Hyman was on the podium three times at the AAA Championships, finishing second behind Gordon Pirie at the 1960 AAA Championships and third at both the 1958 AAA Championships and 1962 AAA Championships.

In addition to athletics, Hyman played a key role in the development of elite orienteering in Britain during the 1980s and 1990s as founder and running coach of the British Orienteering Squad. He was part of the team during that period that progressed the Squad from a very low level to world class.
