= Bryan Rose =

New Zealand long-distance runner

Bryan Rose (born 24 July 1943) is a former New Zealand long-distance runner who was part of New Zealand's winning team in the 1973 IAAF World Cross Country Championships. He also competed in the 5,000 metres at the 1974 Commonwealth Games and won the New Zealand Cross-Country Championship in 1969.
