= Jim Vernon (footballer) =

Scottish footballer

Personal information
- Full name: James Vernon
- Date of birth: 31 March 1942
- Place of birth: Kilmarnock, Scotland
- Date of death: 17 September 2014 (aged 72)
- Place of death: Ardrossan, Scotland
- Position: Full back

Youth career
- Jordanhill Training College

Senior career*
Years	Team	Apps	(Gls)
1962–1963	Queen's Park	9	(0)
1963	Clyde	2	(0)

International career
1962–1963	Scotland Amateurs	4	(0)
- * Club domestic league appearances and goals

James Vernon (31 March 1942 – 17 September 2014) was a Scottish amateur footballer who played in the Scottish League for Queen's Park as a full back. He was capped by Scotland at amateur level.
