= Hedwig Leenaert =

Belgian long-distance runner

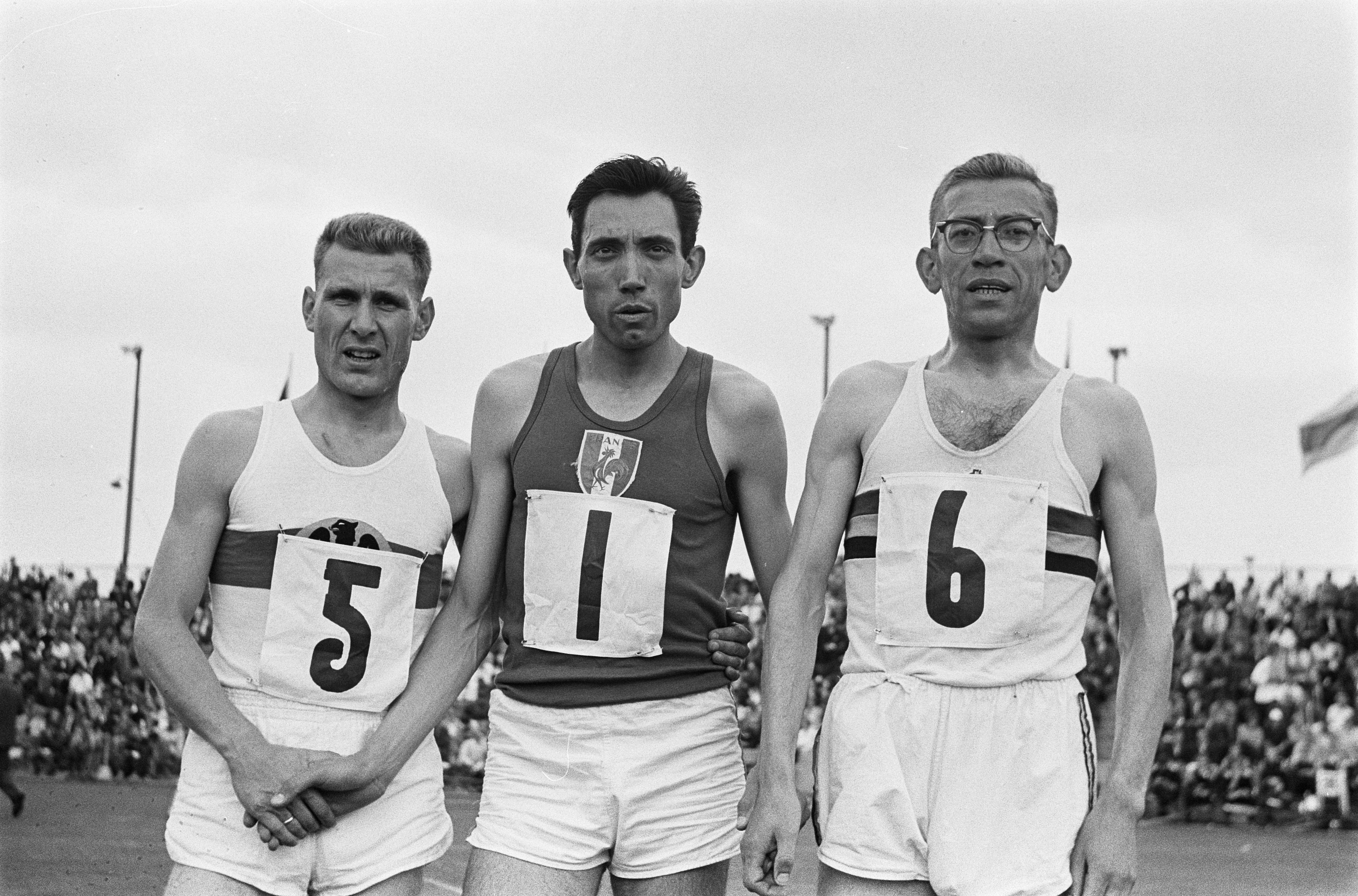
- Frincke, Michel Bernard & Hedwig Leenaert (1963)

Personal information
- Nationality: Belgian
- Born: 28 November 1931
- Died: 19 June 2017 (aged 85)

Sport
- Sport: Long-distance running
- Event: 5000 metres

Hedwig Leenaert (28 November 1931 – 19 June 2017) was a Belgian long-distance runner. He competed in the men's 5000 metres at the 1960 Summer Olympics.
