= Ian McCafferty =

British long-distance runner

Personal information
- Nationality: British (Scottish)
- Born: 24 November 1944 (age 81)
- Height: 175 cm (5 ft 9 in)
- Weight: 57 kg (126 lb)

Sport
- Sport: Athletics
- Event: Long-distance running / cross country
- Club: Law & District AAC
Medal record
Men's athletics
Representing Scotland
Commonwealth Games
Silver medal – second place	1970 Edinburgh	5000 metres
International CC Championships
Gold medal – first place	1964 Dublin	Junior race
Silver medal – second place	1964 Dublin	Junior team

Ian John McCafferty (born 24 November 1944) is a Scottish former long-distance runner. He won the silver medal at the 1970 Commonwealth Games and competed at the 1972 Summer Olympics.

== Biography ==
McCafferty finished second behind Australian Ron Clarke and Hungarian Lajos Mecser in the 3 miles event at the 1967 AAA Championships and by virtue of being the highest placed British athlete was considered the British 3 miles champion. The U.S. magazine Track & Field News' annual world rankings ranked McCafferty fifth at 5000 metres in 1967.

McCafferty became the third fastest British miler of all time in 1969. The following year he represented Scotland at the 1970 British Commonwealth Games in his home county. He recorded a time of 13:23.34 for the 5000 metres, which was considered one of the all time great races. Reigning European 5000 metres champion Ian Stewart set a new European record and the two Scots moved up to second and third on the world all-time list. In the race McCafferty defeated the current world record holder Ron Clarke, and Olympic 1,500 metres champion Kip Keino. McCafferty also finished sixth in the Commonwealth 1,500 metres in a time of 3:42.2.

McCafferty was Scottish 5000 metres champion in 1971, and was also three times the Scottish champion in the mile run. He also won the AAA Indoor Championships on three occasions for two miles/3000 metres. He won the Junior race at the 1964 International Cross Country Championships.

He represented Great Britain at the 1972 Munich Olympics. Competing over the 5000 m, he finished in 11th place with a time of 13:43.2 minutes. He was quicker in the heats, having won that race in a time of 13:38.2. McCafferty was so disappointed that he never raced again as an amateur. McCafferty was also the first Scot to break the four-minute mile.

At the end of 1972 he was fifth on the world all-time list for 5000 metres.

== Personal bests ==
- Mile run – 3:56.8 min (1969)
- 3000 metres indoors – 7:56.2 min (1967)
- 5000 metres – 13:19.66 min (1972)
