= Ahmed Zammel =

Tunisian long-distance runner

Personal information
- Full name: Ahmed Zairi Zammel
- Nationality: Tunisian
- Born: 12 October 1944 (age 81)

Sport
- Sport: Long-distance running
- Event: 5000 metres

Ahmed Zairi Zammel (born 12 October 1944) is a Tunisian long-distance runner. He competed in the men's 5000 metres at the 1968 Summer Olympics.
