= Jean Vaillant (athlete) =

French long-distance runner (1932–2024)

Personal information
- Nationality: French
- Born: 23 April 1932 Lorient, France
- Died: 25 January 2024 (aged 91)

Sport
- Sport: Long-distance running
- Event: 5000 metres

Jean Vaillant (23 April 1932 – 25 January 2024) was a French long-distance runner. He competed in the men's 5000 metres at the 1964 Summer Olympics. Vaillant died on 25 January 2024, at the age of 91.
