= José Molíns =

Spanish long-distance runner (1933–2023)

Personal information
- Full name: José Molíns Montes
- Nationality: Spanish
- Born: 17 February 1933 Sabadell, Spain
- Died: 2 March 2023 (aged 90)

Sport
- Sport: Long-distance running
- Event: 5000 metres
Medal record
Men's Athletics
Representing Spain
Ibero-American Games
Silver medal – second place	1960 Santiago	5000 metres
Silver medal – second place	1960 Santiago	10,000 metres

José Molíns Montes (17 February 1933 – 2 March 2023) was a Spanish long-distance runner. He competed in the men's 5000 metres at the 1960 Summer Olympics.

Molíns died on 2 March 2023, at the age of 90.
