= Fernando Aguilar =

Spanish long-distance runner

Personal information
- Full name: Fernando Aguilar Camacho
- Nationality: Spanish
- Born: 14 February 1938 Frailes, Jaén, Spain
- Died: 21 June 2013 (aged 75) Torrevieja, Alicante, Spain

Sport
- Sport: Long-distance running
- Event: 5000 metres

Fernando Aguilar Camacho (14 February 1938 – 21 June 2013) was a Spanish long-distance runner. He competed in the men's 5000 metres at the 1964 Summer Olympics.
