= Mariano Haro =

Spanish long-distance runner (1940–2024)

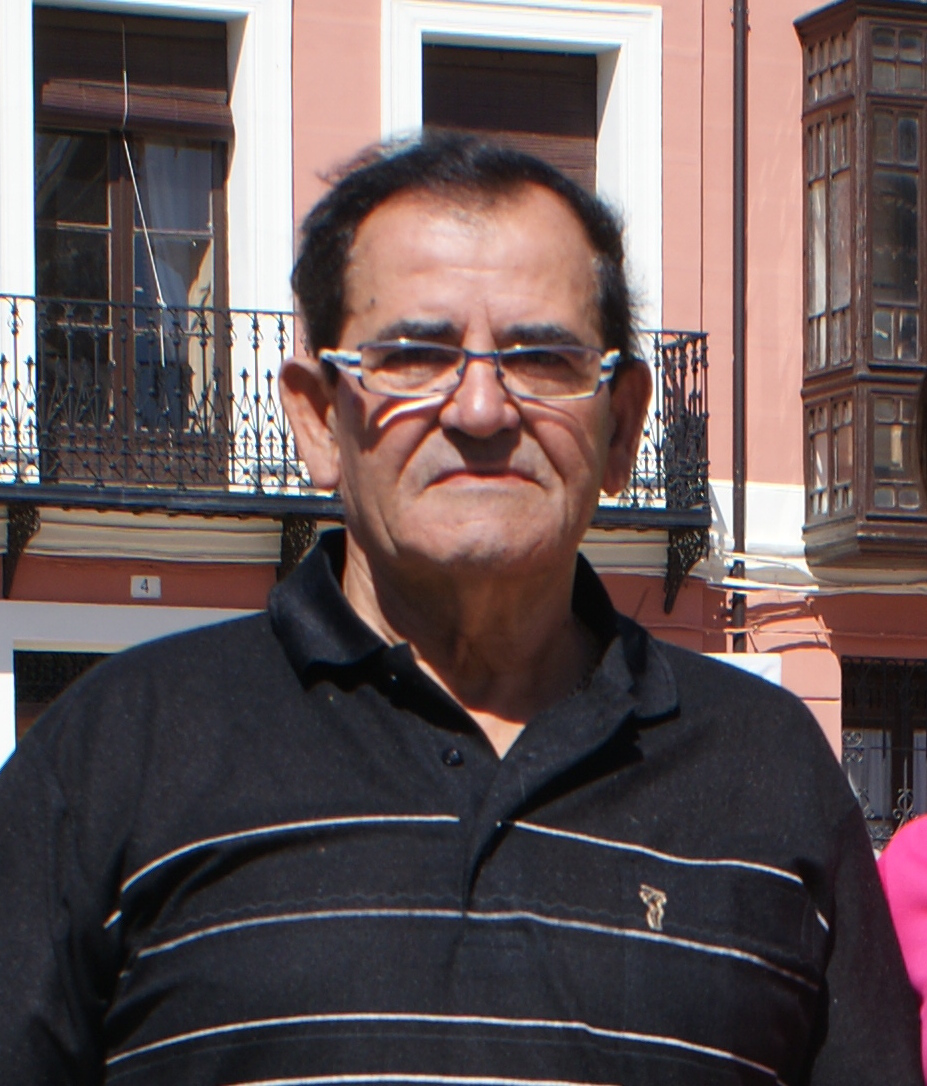
Haro in 2012

Mariano Haro Cisneros (Spanish pronunciation: [maˈɾja.no ˈa.ɾo]; 27 May 1940 – 27 July 2024) was a Spanish athlete, competing in the long-distance events. He was born in Becerril de Campos on 27 May 1940, and died in Palencia on 27 July 2024, at the age of 84.

Haro ran almost compulsively using his gifted legs to run errands and handle odd jobs. He soon became prominently competitive in a sport he hardly chose.

In the 1960s he won almost every 5,000 and 10,000 meter event held in Spain. His closest Spanish competitor was Javier Alvarez Salgado.

Haro placed 4th in the 10,000-meter 1972 Summer Olympics final at Munich in an epic battle against Lasse Virén, Emiel Puttemans, Miruts Yifter, and Frank Shorter. He qualified for the 5,000-meter final in those Games, but defaulted at the eleventh hour. He also competed in the 1976 Summer Olympics at the age of 36, placing 6th in the 10,000-meter event.

Traditionally a cross-country runner, he was runner-up in the Cross World Championships in 1972, 1973, 1974 and 1975; a Spanish National Cross champion from 1971 through 1977; and two-time winner of the International Lasarte Cross Country race in 1974 and 1975.

Haro held Spanish national records in all distances from 1,500 meters to 20 km. He also still holds the Spanish record in the hour race.

After retiring from athletics following the Montreal Olympics, he joined a more financially prosperous career in politics.
