= Athletics at the 1964 Summer Olympics – Men's marathon =

Men's marathon at the Games of the XVIII Olympiad
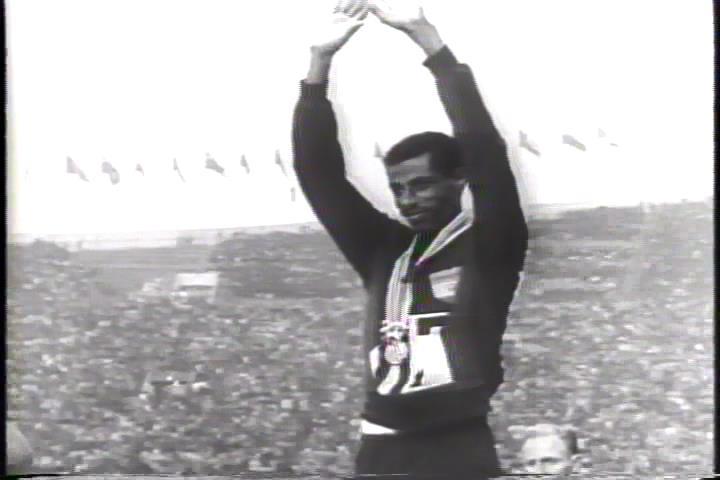
- Abebe Bikila with gold medal from the marathon
- Venue: Olympic Stadium, Tokyo
- Dates: 21 October 1964
- Competitors: 68 from 35 nations
- Winning time: 2:12:11.2 WR

Medalists
1st place, gold medalist(s)		Abebe Bikila; Ethiopia
2nd place, silver medalist(s)		Basil Heatley; Great Britain
3rd place, bronze medalist(s)		Kōkichi Tsuburaya; Japan

Official Video Marathon Highlights Video on YouTube

The men's marathon was part of the Athletics at the 1964 Summer Olympics program in Tokyo. It was held on 21 October 1964. 79 athletes from 41 nations entered, with 68 starting and 58 finishing. The maximum number of athletes per nation had been set at 3 since the 1930 Olympic Congress. The event was won by Abebe Bikila of Ethiopia, the first man to successfully defend Olympic gold in the marathon (and, indeed, the first to win two medals of any color in Olympic marathons). Unlike in 1960, he wore shoes this time. Great Britain earned its first marathon medal since 1948 with Basil Heatley's silver; Japan took its first medal since 1936 with bronze by Kōkichi Tsuburaya.

During the medal ceremony, the national anthem of Japan was played for Bikila as the band did not know "Ethiopia, Be Happy", the country's anthem at the time.

== Background ==
This was the 15th appearance of the event, which is one of 12 athletics events to have been held at every Summer Olympics. Returning runners from the 1960 marathon included defending champion Abebe Bikila of Ethiopia and ninth-place finisher Osvaldo Suárez of Argentina. Bikila was favored to repeat. Significant challengers were Toru Terasawa of Japan (who had taken the world record from Bikila at the 1963 Beppu-Ōita Marathon and held it until the 1963 Polytechnic Marathon), Leonard Edelen of the United States (who had held the world record from the 1963 Polytechnic to the 1964 Polytechnic), and Basil Heatley of Great Britain (the current world record, who had broken it at the 1964 Polytechnic).

Luxembourg (not counting Michel Theato, the gold medalist in 1900 who was Luxembourg-born but registered as a French competitor) Nepal, Puerto Rico, Rhodesia, Northern Rhodesia, Tanzania, Thailand, and Vietnam each made their first appearance in Olympic marathons. The United States made its 15th appearance, the only nation to have competed in each Olympic marathon to that point.

== Competition format and course ==
As all Olympic marathons, the competition was a single race. The marathon distance of 26 miles, 385 yards was run over an out-and-back course. The course was very flat and straight.

== Records ==
These were the standing world and Olympic records prior to the 1964 Summer Olympics.

World record	Basil Heatley (GBR)	2:13:55	London, United Kingdom	13 June 1964
Olympic record	Abebe Bikila (ETH)	2:15:16.2	Rome, Italy	10 September 1960

Abebe Bikila set a new world record at 2:12:11.2.

== Schedule ==
All times are Japan Standard Time (UTC+9)

Date	Time	Round
Wednesday, 21 October 1964	13:00	Final

== Results ==
Bikila broke the world's best time for the marathon by 1 minute 44 seconds set by runner-up Basil Heatley four months prior at the Polytechnic Marathon to defend his Olympic gold medal.

Rank	Athlete	Nation	Time	Notes
1st place, gold medalist(s)	Abebe Bikila	Ethiopia	2:12:11.2	WR, OR
2nd place, silver medalist(s)	Basil Heatley	Great Britain	2:16:19.2	
3rd place, bronze medalist(s)	Kōkichi Tsuburaya	Japan	2:16:22.8	
4	Brian Kilby	Great Britain	2:17:02.4	
5	József Sütő	Hungary	2:17:55.8	
6	Leonard Edelen	United States	2:18:12.4	
7	Aurèle Vandendriessche	Belgium	2:18:42.6	
8	Kenji Kimihara	Japan	2:19:49.0	
9	Ron Clarke	Australia	2:20:26.8	
10	Demissie Wolde	Ethiopia	2:21:25.2	
11	Lee Sang-hun	South Korea	2:22:02.8	
12	Bakir Benaïssa	Morocco	2:22:27.0	
13	Eino Oksanen	Finland	2:22:36.0	
14	Billy Mills	United States	2:22:55.4	
15	Toru Terasawa	Japan	2:23:09.0	
16	Kim Yun-Bum	South Korea	2:24:40.6	
17	Giorgio Jegher	Italy	2:24:45.2	
18	Václav Chudomel	Czechoslovakia	2:24:46.8	
19	Ron Hill	Great Britain	2:25:34.4	
20	Paavo Pystynen	Finland	2:26:00.6	
21	Fidel Negrete	Mexico	2:26:07.0	
22	Nikolay Tikhomirov	Soviet Union	2:26:07.4	
23	Pete McArdle	United States	2:26:24.4	
24	Heinrich Hagen	United Team of Germany	2:26:39.8	
25	Pavel Kantorek	Czechoslovakia	2:26:47.2	
26	Nikolay Abramov	Soviet Union	2:27:09.4	
27	Ray Puckett	New Zealand	2:27:34.0	
28	Eino Valle	Finland	2:27:34.8	
29	Jeff Julian	New Zealand	2:27:57.6	
30	Ricardo Vidal	Chile	2:28:01.6	
31	Robert Vagg	Australia	2:28:41.0	
32	Guido Vögele	Switzerland	2:29:17.8	
33	Balkrishan Akotkar	India	2:29:27.4	
34	Jean Aniset	Luxembourg	2:29:52.6	
35	Thin Sumbwegam	Burma	2:30:35.8	
36	Constantin Grecescu	Romania	2:30:42.6	
37	Janos Pinter	Hungary	2:30:50.2	
38	Gerhard Hönicke	United Team of Germany	2:33:23.0	
39	Manfred Naumann	United Team of Germany	2:33:42.0	
40	Antonio Ambu	Italy	2:34:37.6	
41	Oskar Leupi	Switzerland	2:35:05.4	
42	Ivan Keats	New Zealand	2:36:16.8	
43	Harbans Lal	India	2:37:05.8	
44	Armando Aldegalega	Portugal	2:38:02.2	
45	Chrisantus Nyakwayo	Kenya	2:38:38.6	
46	Constantino Kapambwe	Northern Rhodesia	2:39:28.4	
47	Omari Abdallah	Tanzania	2:40:06.0	
48	Muhammad Youssef	Pakistan	2:40:46.0	
49	Naftali Temu	Kenya	2:40:46.6	
50	Ju Hyeong-gyeol	South Korea	2:41:08.2	
51	Mathias Kanda	Rhodesia	2:41:09.0	
52	Anthony Cook	Australia	2:42:03.6	
53	Víctor Peralta	Mexico	2:44:23.6	
54	Trevor Haynes	Northern Rhodesia	2:45:08.6	
55	Abe Fornés	Puerto Rico	2:46:22.6	
56	Robson Mrombe	Rhodesia	2:49:30.8	
57	Laurent Chifita	Northern Rhodesia	2:51:52.2	
58	Chanom Sirirangsri	Thailand	2:59:25.6	
—	Ganga Bahadur Thapa	Nepal	DNF	2:23:41 at 40 km
—	Bhupendra Silwal	Nepal	DNF	2:34:12 at 40 km
—	James Hogan	Ireland	DNF	1:51:27 at 35 km
—	Viktor Baykov	Soviet Union	DNF	1:39:13 at 30 km
—	Mohamed Hadheb Hannachi	Tunisia	DNF	1:46:18 at 30 km
—	Andrew Soi	Kenya	DNF	1:23:37 at 25 km
—	Osvaldo Roberto Suarez	Argentina	DNF	1:09:00 at 20 km
—	Mamo Wolde	Ethiopia	DNF	0:47:14 at 15 km
—	Hedhili Ben Boubaker	Tunisia	DNF	0:47:51 at 15 km
—	Nguyễn Văn Lý	Vietnam	DNF	1:02:51 at 15 km
—	Jean Louis Brougier	France	DNS	
—	Dumitru Chitoban	Romania	DNS	
—	Suliman Fighi Hassan	Libya	DNS	
—	Mohammed Gammoudi	Tunisia	DNS	
—	Alberto Garabito	Bolivia	DNS	
—	Ranatunge Karunananda	Ceylon	DNS	
—	Bruce Kidd	Canada	DNS	
—	Lajos Mecser	Hungary	DNS	
—	Alejo Montano	Bolivia	DNS	
—	Jean Randrianjatovo	Madagascar	DNS	
—	Ryoo Man-Hyung	North Korea	DNS	
