= Fornes =

Fornes may refer to the following:

== Places ==
=== Norway ===
- Fornes, Nordland, a village in Åndøy municipality, Nordland county
- Fornes, Trøndelag, a village in Stjørdal municipality, Trøndelag county
- Fornes, Skånland, a village in Skånland municipality, Troms county
- Fornes, Troms, a village in Ibestad municipality, Troms county

=== Spain ===
- Fornes, Granada, a village and municipality in Granada province

== Other ==
- Fornes (surname)
- Fornes dialects, dialects that are spoken in two villages in Italy
- SS Fornes, a Norwegian Government ship in service from 1946 to 1948
- Fornes' colilargo, a South American rodent also known as Oligoryzomys fornesi
