= 1966 European Athletics Championships – Men's marathon =

Men's marathon at the European Athletics Championships

The men's marathon at the 1966 European Athletics Championships was held in Budapest, Hungary, on 4 September 1966.

== Medalists ==
Gold	Jim Hogan; Great Britain
Silver	Aurèle Vandendriessche; Belgium
Bronze	Gyula Tóth; Hungary

== Results ==
=== Final ===
4 September

Rank	Name	Nationality	Time	Notes
1st place, gold medalist(s)	Jim Hogan	Great Britain	2:20:04.6	
2nd place, silver medalist(s)	Aurèle Vandendriessche	Belgium	2:21:43.6	
3rd place, bronze medalist(s)	Gyula Tóth	Hungary	2:22:02.0	
4	Carlos Pérez	Spain	2:22:23.8	
5	Anatoliy Skripnik	Soviet Union	2:23:14.8	
6	Anatoliy Sukharkov	Soviet Union	2:23:33.8	
7	Kalevi Ihaksi	Finland	2:23:38.6	
8	Pavel Kantorek	Czechoslovakia	2:23:49.4	
9	Gioacchino de Palma	Italy	2:25:10.6	
10	Friedel Wiggershaus	West Germany	2:25:11.4	
11	Maurice Peiren	Belgium	2:25:48.2	
12	Ron Hill	Great Britain	2:26:04.8	
13	Rudolf Salov	Soviet Union	2:26:08.6	
14	Karl-Heinz Sievers	West Germany	2:26:50.8	
15	Attila Tormási	Hungary	2:27:51.4	
16	İsmail Akçay	Turkey	2:28:18.8	
17	Gerhard Hönicke	East Germany	2:29:23.0	
18	Václav Chudomel	Czechoslovakia	2:30:34.2	
19	André Lacour	France	2:31:37.0	
20	Gerhard Lange	East Germany	2:32:10.0	
21	Heinrich Hagen	East Germany	2:33:26.2	
22	Hüseyin Aktaş	Turkey	2:36:00.0	
23	Zdzisław Bogusz	Poland	2:37:04.8	
24	Njazi Dajçi	Albania	2:37:41.8	
25	Graham Taylor	Great Britain	2:38:26.0	
26	Daut Falli	Albania	2:46:02.0	
	Jean Aniset	Luxembourg	DNF	
	Luigi Conti	Italy	DNF	
	Antonio Ambu	Italy	DNF	
	Franc Červan	Yugoslavia	DNF	
	James McNamara	Ireland	DNF	
	Henri Clerckx	Belgium	DNF	
	József Sütő	Hungary	DNF	
	Thyge Thøgersen	Denmark	DNF	
	Aad Steylen	Netherlands	DNF	

== Participation ==
According to an unofficial count, 35 athletes from 19 countries participated in the event.

- Albania(2)
- Belgium (3)
- Czechoslovakia (2)
- Denmark (1)
- East Germany (3)
- Finland (1)
- France (1)
- Hungary (3)
- Ireland (1)
- Italy (3)
- Luxembourg (1)
- Netherlands (1)
- Poland (1)
- Soviet Union (3)
- Spain (1)
- Turkey (2)
- Great Britain (3)
- West Germany (2)
- Yugoslavia (1)
