= 1962 European Athletics Championships – Men's marathon =

Men's marathon at the European Athletics Championships

The men's marathon at the 1962 European Athletics Championships was held in Belgrade, then Yugoslavia, on 16 September 1962.

== Medalists ==
Gold	Brian Kilby; Great Britain
Silver	Aurèle Vandendriessche; Belgium
Bronze	Viktor Baykov; Soviet Union

== Results ==
=== Final ===
16 September

Rank	Name	Nationality	Time	Notes
1st place, gold medalist(s)	Brian Kilby	Great Britain	2:23:18.8	
2nd place, silver medalist(s)	Aurèle Vandendriessche	Belgium	2:24:02.0	
3rd place, bronze medalist(s)	Viktor Baykov	Soviet Union	2:24:19.8	
4	Alistair Wood	Great Britain	2:25:57.8	
5	Pavel Kantorek	Czechoslovakia	2:26:54.4	
6	Sergey Popov	Soviet Union	2:27:46.8	
7	Thyge Thøgersen	Denmark	2:30:04.8	
8	Ivan Mustapić	Yugoslavia	2:30:23.4	
9	Stanisław Ożóg	Poland	2:30:32.2	PB
10	Václav Chudomel	Czechoslovakia	2:30:33.0	
11	Tenho Salakka	Finland	2:33:00.0	
12	Eino Oksanen	Finland	2:33:40.8	
13	Albert Messitt	Ireland	2:34:55.2	
14	Franjo Škrinjar	Yugoslavia	2:36:14.8	
15	Béla Szalay	Hungary	2:36:38.0	
16	Bruno Bartholome	East Germany	2:37:37.6	
17	Gerhard Hönicke	East Germany	2:43:31.6	
18	Evert Nyberg	Sweden	2:44:55.8	
19	Paul Genève	France	2:45:08.0	
20	Werner Zylka	West Germany	2:47:40.0	
21	Guido Vögele	Switzerland	2:48:11.6	
22	Niilo Sorrela	Finland	2:48:43.2	
	Nikolay Rumyantsev	Soviet Union	DNF	
	Ron Hill	Great Britain	DNF	
	Miguel Navarro	Spain	DNF	
	Franjo Mihalić	Yugoslavia	DNF	
	Haydar Erturan	Turkey	DNF	
	Salvatore Cuccuru	Italy	DNF	

== Participation ==
According to an unofficial count, 28 athletes from 18 countries participated in the event.

- Belgium (1)
- Czechoslovakia (2)
- Denmark (1)
- East Germany (2)
- Finland (3)
- France (1)
- Hungary (1)
- Ireland (1)
- Italy (1)
- Poland (1)
- Soviet Union (3)
- Spain (1)
- Sweden (1)
- Switzerland (1)
- Turkey (1)
- Great Britain (3)
- West Germany (1)
- Yugoslavia (3)
