= Nikolay Abramov =

Nikolay Abramov may refer to:

- Nikolay Abramov (athlete) (1933–2003), Soviet Olympic runner
- Nikolay Abramov (footballer, born 1950) (1950–2005), Soviet footballer
- Nikolay Abramov (footballer, born 1984) (1984–2011), Russian footballer
- Nikolay Abramov (writer) (1961–2016), Russian Vepsian writer
