= Ranatunge Karunananda =

Sri Lankan distance runner

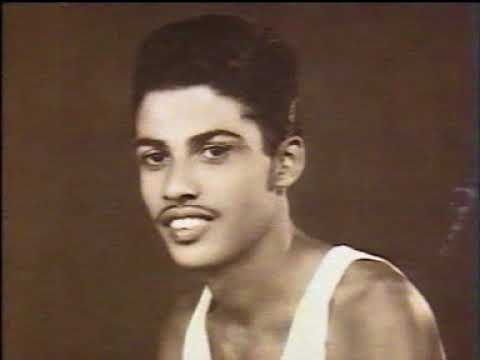

Personal information
- Nationality: Sri Lankan
- Born: 21 May 1936 Ampitiya, British Ceylon
- Died: 15 December 1974 (aged 38)

Sport
- Country: Sri Lanka
- Sport: Track and field
- Events: 5000 meters, 10,000 meters Long-distance running
- Updated on 15 October 2015

Ranatunge Koralage Jayasekara Karunananda (21 May 1936 – 15 December 1974) was a Sri Lankan athlete. He was a long distance runner and represented the country during the 1960s and 1970s. Karunananda competed in the 10,000 meter race and finished last at the 1964 Summer Olympics in Tokyo with a time of 34:21.2.

== Early life ==
Karunananda was born in Ampitiya on May 21st, 1936. He attended primary school at Jinaraja Boys College in Gampola, and then attended Berrewaerts College in Ampitiya. In 1961, Karunananda enlisted in the Ceylonese Army and served in the First Engineers Regiment.

== 1964 Olympics ==
Karunananda represented Ceylon in the 1964 Summer Olympics Men’s 5000 meters and Men’s 10,000 meters competitions. In the 10,000 meter race, Karunananda was soon overtaken by the leading athletes and was lapped a total of four times until the winner of the race, Billy Mills of the United States, broke the tape to finish the race. Karunananda continued to run after the others had finished the race. At first, spectators started to jeer at him, but when he eventually finished the race, he was met with cheers and applause.

Two days later, Karunananda finished second from last in the heats of the 5000 meters, well behind the other runners but a minute ahead of Nguyễn Văn Lý from South Vietnam.

== Legacy ==
Japanese reporter Haruo Suzuki was one of the first reporters to have an interview with Karunananda following the race. Instantly, Japanese media started to portray Karunananda as a hero. When questioned, Karunananda told reporters: "The Olympic spirit is not to win, but to take part. So I came here. I took part in the 10,000 meters and completed my rounds."

He was flooded with small gifts which Japanese fans usually send to their heroes. The Olympic Village post office asked him to come down and collect his mail because the sack was too big for them to deliver. "I saw you on television running all one and I couldn't keep back my tears", a letter from a young housewife said. "I felt I was feeling for the first time the true Olympic spirit".

Karunananda's Olympic story has been entered into Japanese elementary school national language textbooks titled 'Uniform Number 67', 'Bottom Ranked Hero'.

== Death ==
Karunananda was invited to Japan in January 1975, but died drowning in the Namal Oya reservoir in Ampara, Sri Lanka two weeks before. His wife suffered a mental breakdown following her husband’s death and the family was forced onto the streets. Later, one of the relatives offered to fund and take care of his family. The Sri Lankan government did not acknowledge his legacy or look after his family. In June 2026, more than 50 years after Karunananda’s death, Newswire reported that his widow would receive monthly financial assistance from the President’s Fund to support her medical treatment and clinical needs.
