= Athletics at the 1964 Summer Olympics – Men's 10,000 metres =

Men's 10,000 metres at the Games of the XVIII Olympiad
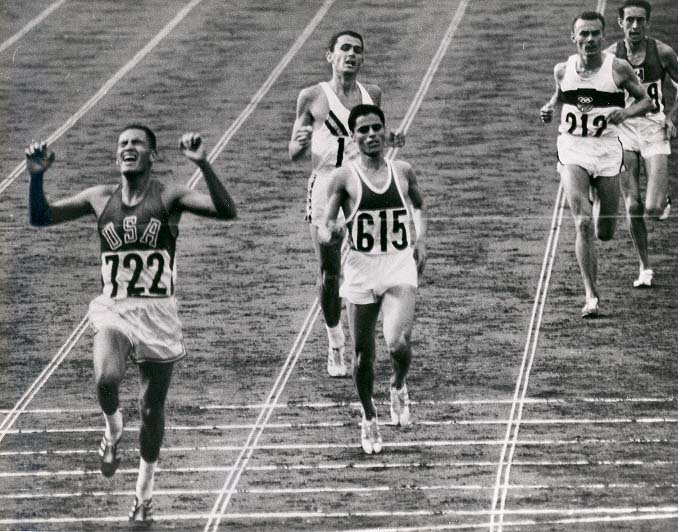
- Billy Mills crossing the finish line (U.S. Marine Corps photo)
- Venue: Olympic Stadium
- Dates: 14 October 1964
- Competitors: 29 from 17 nations
- Winning time: 28:24.4 OR

Medalists
1st place, gold medalist(s)		Billy Mills	United States
2nd place, silver medalist(s)		Mohammed Gammoudi	Tunisia
3rd place, bronze medalist(s)		Ron Clarke	Australia

Official Video Video on YouTube

The men's 10,000 metres was the longest of the seven men's track races in the Athletics at the 1964 Summer Olympics program in Tokyo. It was held on 14 October. 38 athletes from 23 nations entered, with 6 more not starting the event. The event was held as a single heat. The winning margin was 0.4 seconds.

== Results ==
=== Final ===
World record holder Ron Clarke of Australia set the tone of the race. His tactic of surging every other lap appeared to be working. Halfway through the race, only five runners were still with Clarke: Mohammed Gammoudi of Tunisia, Mamo Wolde of Ethiopia, Barry Magee of New Zealand, Kokichi Tsuburaya of Japan, and Billy Mills of the United States. Magee and Tsuburaya, the local favorite, lost contact first, then Wolde. With two laps to go, only two runners were still with Clarke. On paper, it seemed to be Clarke's race. He had run a world record time of 28:15.6 while neither Gammoudi nor Mills had ever run under 29 minutes.

Mills and Clarke were running together with Gammoudi right behind as they entered the final lap. They were lapping other runners and, down the backstretch, Clarke was boxed in. He pushed Mills once, then again. Then Gammoudi pushed his way between them both and surged into the lead as they rounded the final curve. Clarke recovered and began chasing Gammoudi while Mills appeared to be too far back to be in contention. Clarke failed to catch Gammoudi, but Mills pulled out to lane 4 and sprinted past them both. His winning time of 28:24.4 was almost 50 seconds faster than he had run before and set a new Olympic record for the event. No American had ever before won the 10,000 m, nor had any come seriously close; the only Americans to win a medal at the event since Mills are Galen Rupp, who took the silver at the 2012 London Olympics, and Grant Fisher, who won bronze at the 2024 Paris Olympics.

American television viewers were able to hear the surprise and drama as NBC expert analyst Dick Bank screamed, "Look at Mills, look at Mills" over the more sedate play-by-play announcer Bud Palmer, who seemed to miss what was unfolding. For bringing that drama to the coverage, Bank was fired as it was considered improper at the time, although Palmer was noted as being thankful to Bank for noticing the drama.

The top four runners beat the standing Olympic record.

Place	Athlete	Nation	Time	5000
1	Billy Mills	United States	28:24.4 OR	14:04.6
2	Mohammed Gammoudi	Tunisia	28:24.8	14:07.0
3	Ron Clarke	Australia	28:25.8	14:05.0
4	Mamo Wolde	Ethiopia	28:31.8	14:06.0
5	Leonid Ivanov	Soviet Union	28:53.2	14:13.0
6	Kōkichi Tsuburaya	Japan	28:59.3	14:09.0
7	Murray Halberg	New Zealand	29:10.8	14:16.0
8	Tony Cook	Australia	29:15.8	14:11.0
9	Gerry Lindgren	United States	29:20.6	14:12.0
10	Franc Červan	Yugoslavia	29:21.0	14:16.0
11	Siegfried Herrmann	United Team of Germany	29:27.0	14:17.0
12	Henri Clerckx	Belgium	29:29.6	14:28.0
13	Jean Fayolle	France	29:30.8	14:27.0
14	Teruo Funai	Japan	29:33.2	14:27.0
15	Jean Vaillant	France	29:33.6	14:27.0
16	József Sütő	Hungary	29:43.0	14:36.0
17	Josef Tomas	Czechoslovakia	29:46.4	14:39.0
18	Ron Hill	Great Britain	29:53.0	14:27.0
19	Pal Benum	Norway	30:00.8	14:38.0
20	Siegfried Rothe	United Team of Germany	30:04.6	14:39.0
21	Michael Bullivant	Great Britain	30:12.0	14:28.0
22	Fergus Murray	Great Britain	30:22.4	14:29.0
23	Barry Magee	New Zealand	30:32.0	14:06.0
24	Ron Larrieu	United States	30:42.6	14:37.0
25	Pyotr Bolotnikov	Soviet Union	30:52.8	14:42.0
26	Bruce Kidd	Canada	30:56.4	14:43.0
27	Artur Hannemann	United Team of Germany	30:56.6	15:13.0
28	Watanabe Kazumi	Japan	31:00.6	15:12.0
29	Ranatunge Karunananda	Ceylon	32:21.2	16:43.0
	Pascal Mfyomi	Tanzania	DNF	
	Naftali Temu	Kenya	DNF	
	János Pintér	Hungary	DNF	
	Jim Hogan	Ireland	DNF	
	Muharrem Dalkılıç	Turkey	DNF	
	Andrei Barabaș	Romania	DNF	
	Fernando Aguilar	Spain	DNF	
	Mohamed Hadheb Hannachi	Tunisia	DNF	
	Nikolay Dutov	Soviet Union	DNF	
