= Viktor Baykov =

Soviet long-distance runner

Medal record

Men's athletics

Representing Soviet Union

European Championships
Bronze medal – third place	1962 Belgrade	Marathon

Viktor Baykov (born February 9, 1935, in Ryazan, Russian SFSR, Soviet Union) is a retired marathon runner from the Soviet Union, who won the bronze medal at the European Championships, behind Great Britain's Brian Kilby and Belgium's Aurèle Vandendriessche. He is a four-time winner of the Soviet national marathon title (1961–1964).
