= Balkrishan Akotkar =

Indian long-distance runner

Personal information
- Nationality: Indian
- Born: 1 July 1937 (age 89)

Sport
- Sport: Long-distance running
- Event: Marathon

Balkrishna Akotkar (born 1 July 1937) is an Indian long-distance runner. He competed in the marathon at the 1964 Summer Olympics.

He stood 33rd in the marathon event at the 1964 Olympics. Post his retirement from sports, he has been monumental in development of future athletes. He has headed a committee for the selection of male and female athletes to represent Maharashtra state in the National Cross Country Championship.
