= Gyula Tóth (runner) =

Hungarian marathon runner

Personal information
- Born: 12 April 1936 Túrkeve, Hungary
- Died: 2 November 2006 (aged 60) Ózd, Hungary

Sport
- Sport: Marathon running
Medal record
Representing Hungary
European Championships
Bronze medal – third place	1966 Budapest	Marathon

Gyula Tóth (12 April 1936 – 2 November 2006) was a Hungarian marathon runner. He ran a time of 2:34:49 in the 1968 Summer Olympics marathon, and a time of 2:22:59 in the 1972 Summer Olympics marathon. He won the Košice Peace Marathon in 1966 and 1971 and won a bronze medal at the 1966 European Athletics Championships. He won the Budapest Marathon in 1969 and 1971.
