= Berg aan de Maas =

- Village
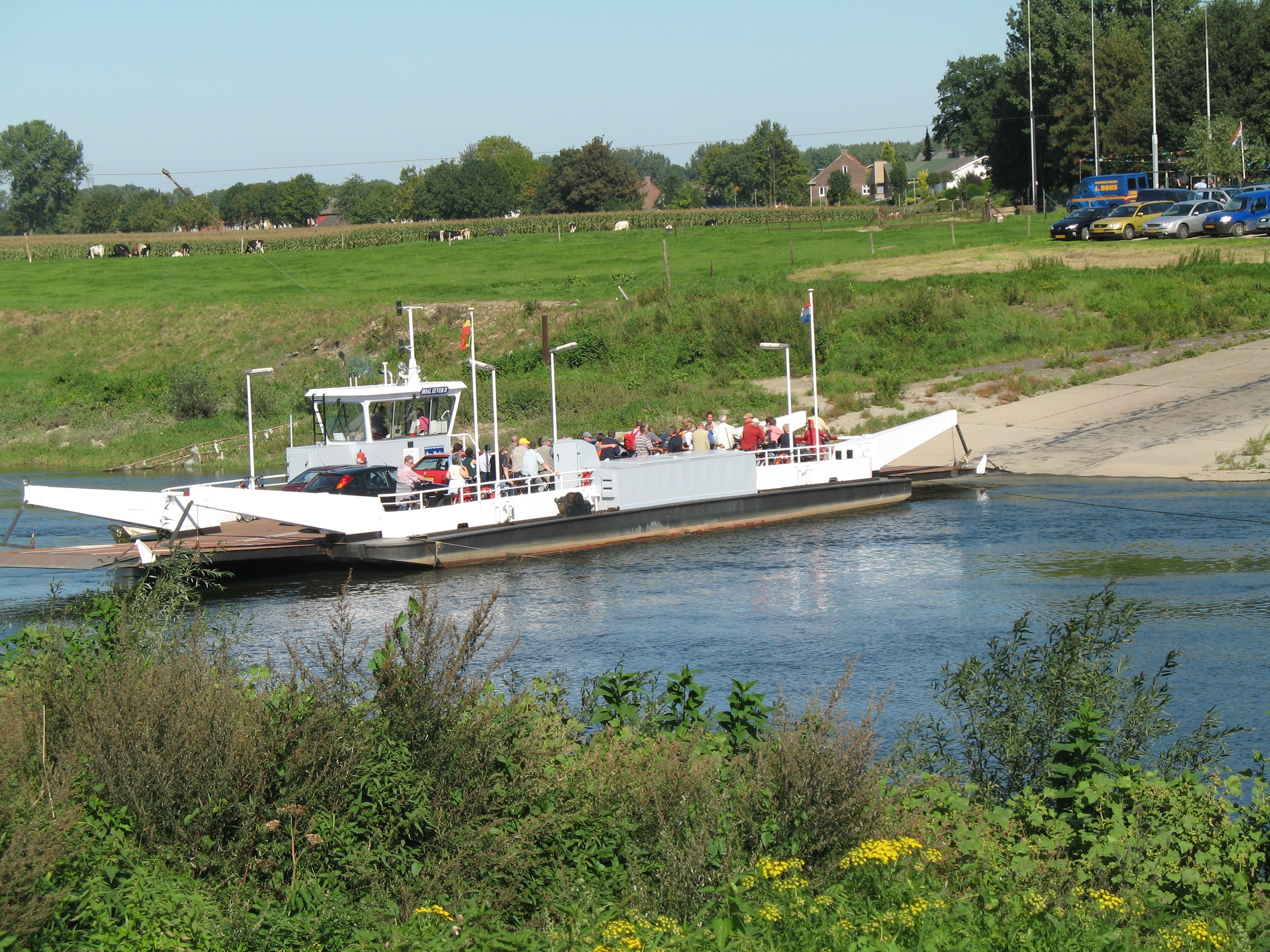
- Ferry between Meeswijk and Berg

- Location in the Netherlands Location in the province of Limburg in the Netherlands
- Coordinates: 51°0′17″N 5°46′17″E
- Country: Netherlands
- Province: Limburg
- Municipality: Stein

Area
  - Total: 1.01 km^{2} (0.39 sq mi)
- Elevation: 46 m (151 ft)

Population (2021)
  - Total: 1,940
  - Density: 1,920/km^{2} (4,970/sq mi)
- Time zone: UTC+1 (CET)
  - Summer (DST): UTC+2 (CEST)
- Postal code: 6129
- Dialing code: 046

Berg, often called Berg aan de Maas, is a village in the Dutch province of Limburg. It is a part of the municipality of Stein, and lies about 6 km northwest of Geleen.

The village was first mentioned in 1294-1295 as "apud Berge", which means "hill on the Maas". Berg aan de Maas was home to 468 people in 1840.

Berg is situated on the right bank of the river Meuse, Maas in Dutch. On the opposite, left bank of the Meuse is Belgian territory, municipality Dilsen-Stokkem. There is a ferry between Berg and Dilsen-Stokkem.

== Gallery ==
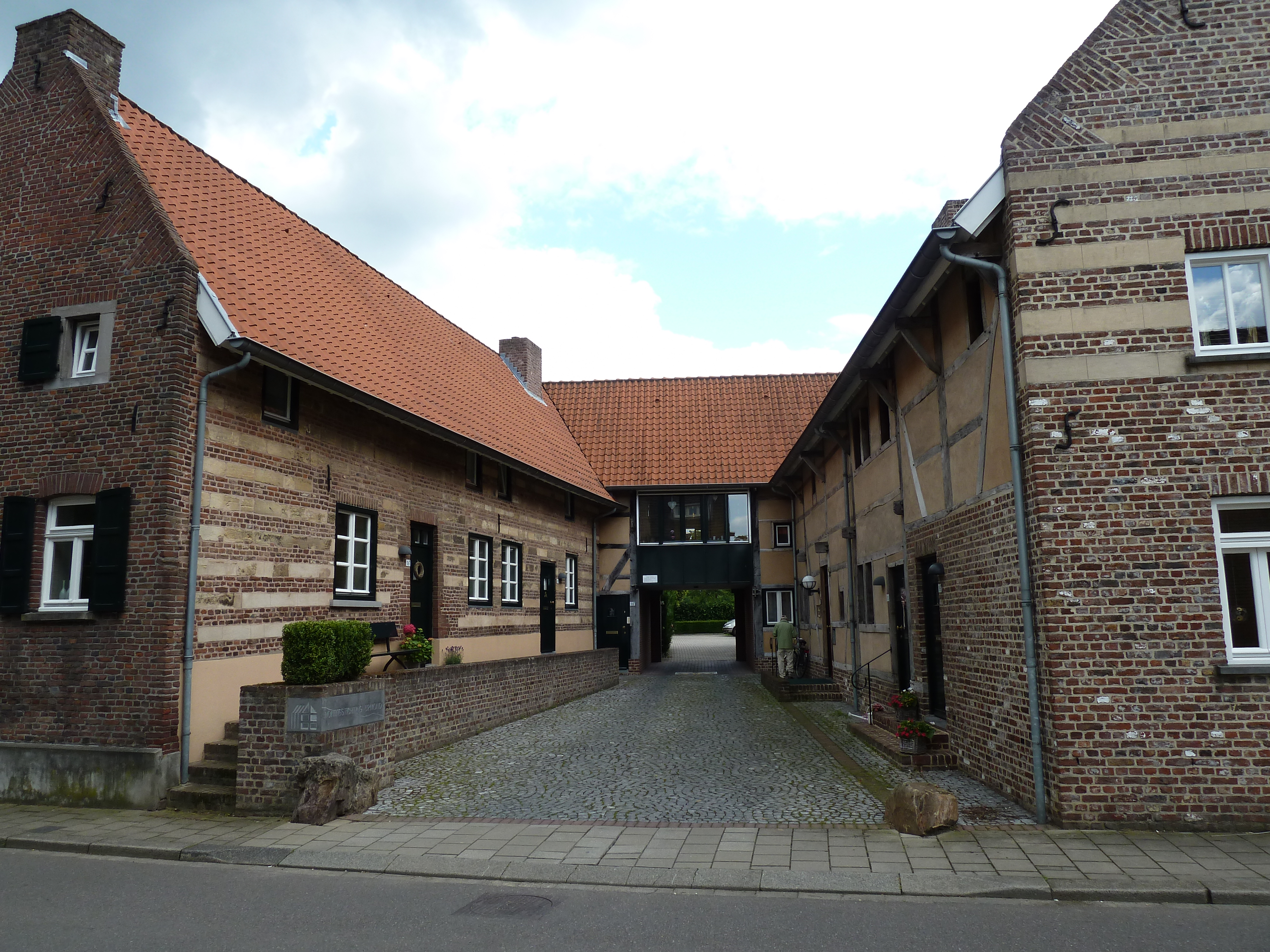
Farm in Berg aan de Maas

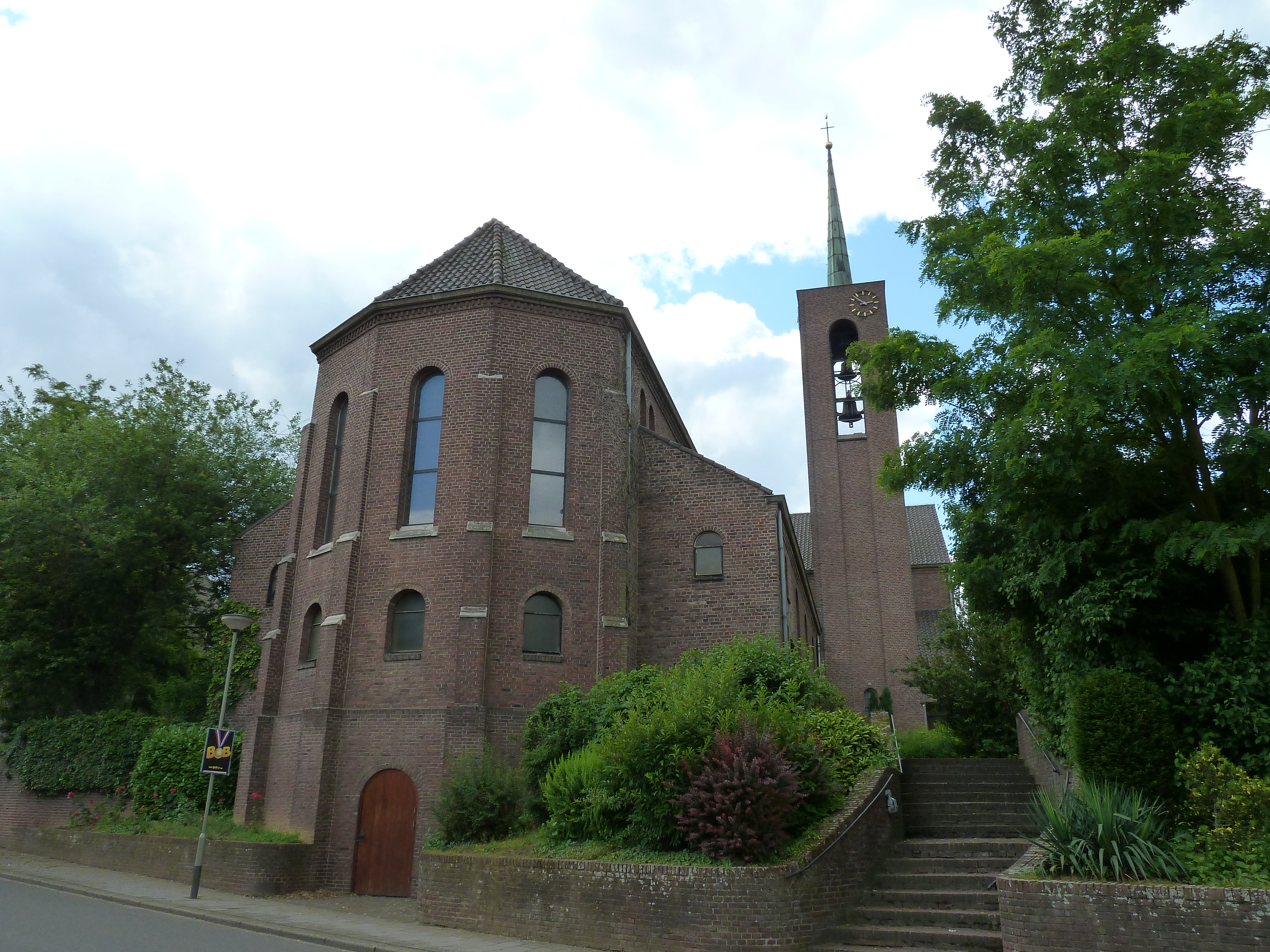
St Michael Church
