= Stein, Limburg =

Stein
- Municipality
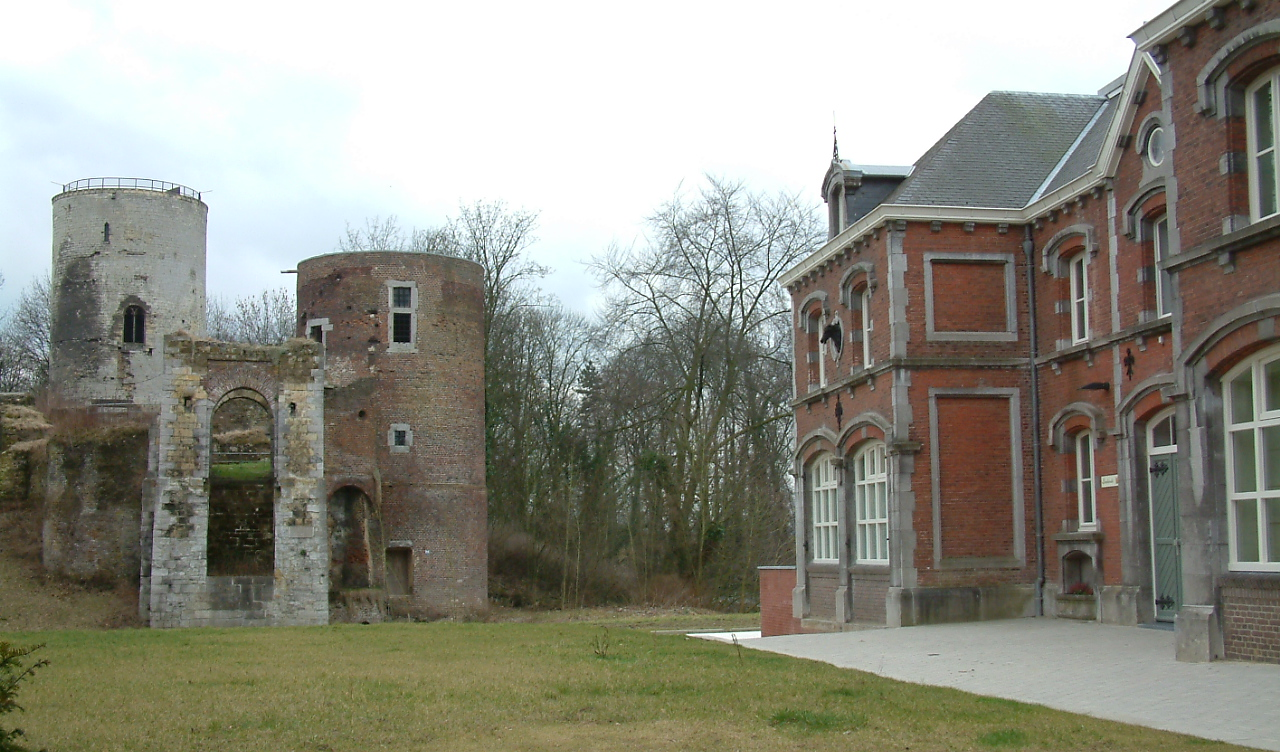
- Stein castle

- Flag Coat of arms

- Location in Limburg
- Coordinates: 50°58′N 5°46′E
- Country: Netherlands
- Province: Limburg

Government
  - Body: Municipal council
  - Mayor: Marion Leurs-Mordang (PvdA)

Area
  - Total: 22.80 km^{2} (8.80 sq mi)
  - Land: 21.08 km^{2} (8.14 sq mi)
  - Water: 1.72 km^{2} (0.66 sq mi)
- Elevation: 61 m (200 ft)

Population (January 2021)
  - Total: 24,875
  - Density: 1,180/km^{2} (3,100/sq mi)
- Demonym(s): Steindenaar, Steinder
- Time zone: UTC+1 (CET)
  - Summer (DST): UTC+2 (CEST)
- Postcode: 6129, 6170–6171, 6180–6181
- Area code: 046
- Website: www.gemeentestein.nl

Stein (Dutch pronunciation: [ˈstɛin], Limburgish: [ˈstɛjn]) is a municipality and a town in the southeastern Netherlands. The municipality had a population of 24,875 in 2021 and covers an area of 22.80 km^{2} (8.80 sq mi) of which 1.72 km^{2} (0.66 sq mi) is water.

The municipality of Stein makes part of the region of South Limburg and lies between the city of Geleen in the east and Beek in the southeast, and lies furthermore west of interchange Kerensheide and the chemical industries of Chemelot. To the west lies the Belgian border, across the Meuse river. In comparison to other cities and villages in the area, Stein is fairly big. It is also the capital city of the municipality with the same name. It has i.a. three Roman Catholic churches, an abandoned mediaeval castle, and a port to the Juliana Canal which used to be the second largest inland port in all of Europe.

On 29 October 2009, the shopping mall of Stein suffered a severe fire. As a result of the calamity, the town subsequently lost 40 shops, 2 banks, 1 restaurant and 6 houses. The adjacent, iconic, 11-story apartment building 'De Stevel', remained intact.

== Population centres ==
- Berg aan de Maas (Berg)
- Catsop (Katsep)
- Elsloo (Aelse)
- Maasband (Maasbendj)
- Meers (Meas)
- Nattenhoven (Nattenoave)
- Stein (Stein)
- Urmond (Uermend, Wermend)

(Local language in parentheses.)

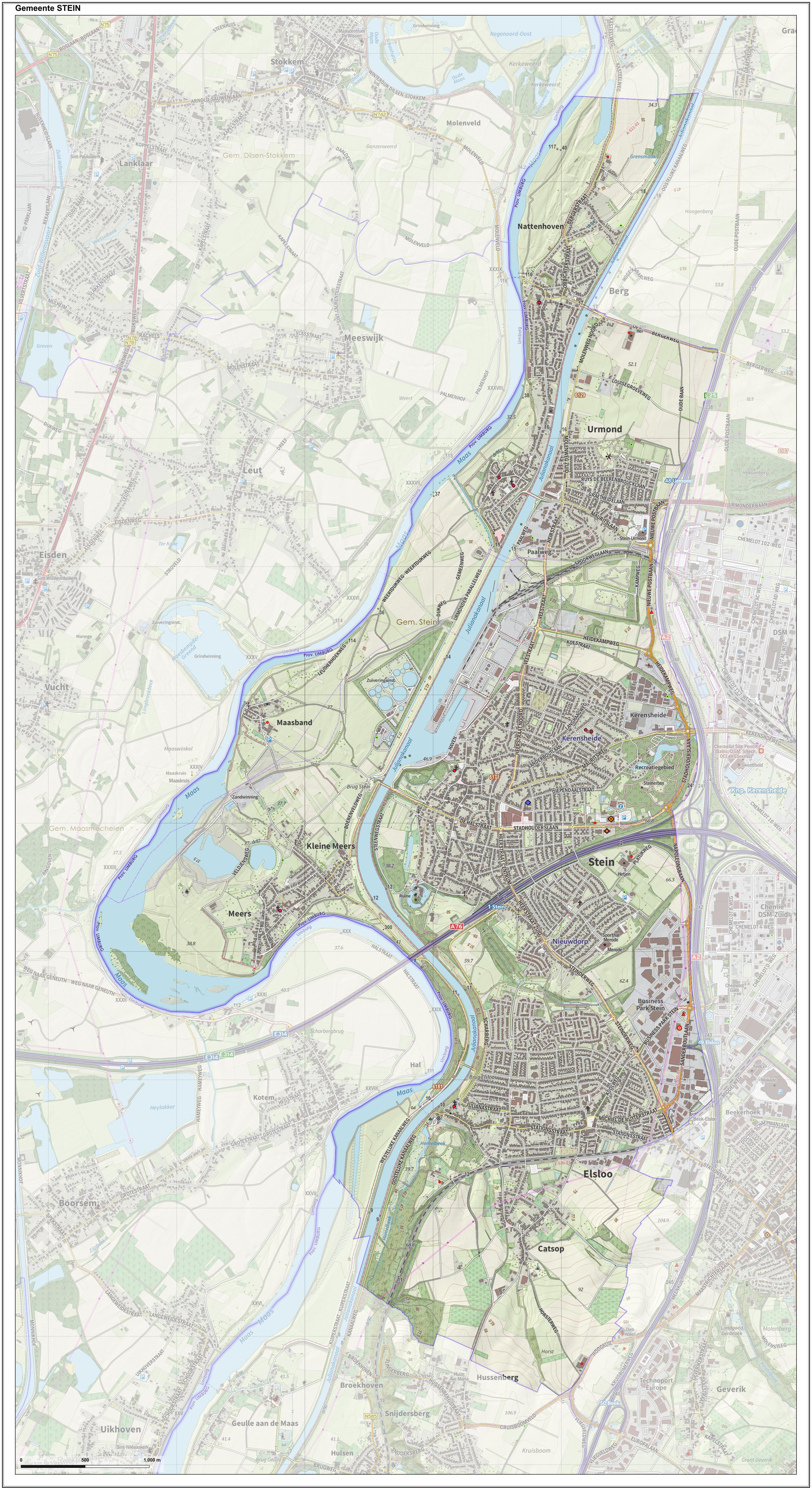
Dutch topographic map of the municipality of Stein, June 2015

== Notable people ==
- Sjefke Janssen (1919 in Elsloo – 2014), a Dutch professional road bicycle racer
- Manfred Naumann (born 1933), a German marathon runner, competed at the 1964 Summer Olympics
- René Lotz (born 1938), a retired Dutch cyclist, competed at the 1960 Summer Olympics
- Mia Gommers (born 1939), a retired Dutch athlete, who competed mainly in the 800 metres; bronze medallist at the 1968 Summer Olympics
- Harry Steevens (born 1945 in Elsloo), a retired Dutch cyclist
- Henk Temmink (born 1952 in Elsloo), a Dutch chess player
- Frank Dikötter (born 1961), a Dutch historian who specialises in modern China
- Silvia Pepels (born 1975) is a triathlon athlete, competed at the first Olympic triathlon at the 2000 Summer Olympics

== See also ==
- Obbicht en Papenhoven
