= Harbans Lal =

Indian long-distance runner

Personal information
- Nationality: Indian
- Born: 11 April 1938 (age 88)

Sport
- Sport: Long-distance running
- Event: Marathon

Harbans Lal (born 11 April 1938) is an Indian long-distance runner. He competed in the marathon at the 1964 Summer Olympics.
