= Ivan Keats =

New Zealand long-distance runner (1937–2020)

Personal information
- Born: 16 April 1937 Christchurch, New Zealand
- Died: 27 August 2020 (aged 83)
- Height: 1.65 m (5 ft 5 in)
- Weight: 60 kg (132 lb)

Sport
- Country: New Zealand
- Sport: Athletics
- Event: Marathon
- Club: Western Suburbs Athletics Club, Auckland

Achievements and titles
- National finals: Marathon: 3rd (1961), 2nd (1964)

Ivan Keats (16 April 1937 – 27 August 2020) was a New Zealand long-distance runner. He competed in the marathon at the 1964 Summer Olympics.
