= Juliana Canal =

36 km long canal in the southern Netherlands

Coordinates: 51°0′51″N 5°47′1″E

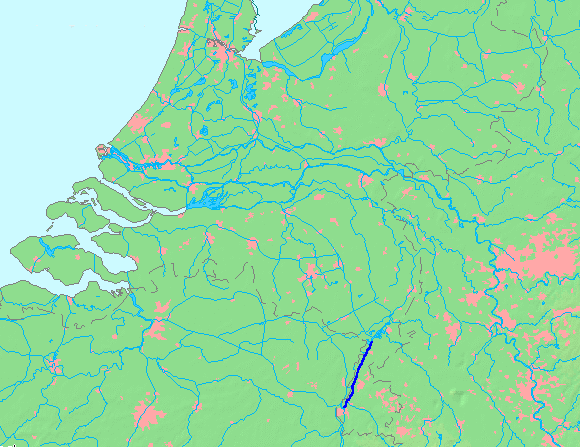
- Map of the Juliana Canal
- Interactive map of Juliana Canal

Specifications
- Length: 36 km (22 mi)

History
- Date completed: 1935

Geography
- Start point: Maastricht, Netherlands
- End point: Maasbracht, Netherlands

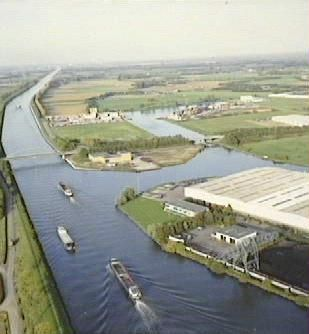
Juliana Canal

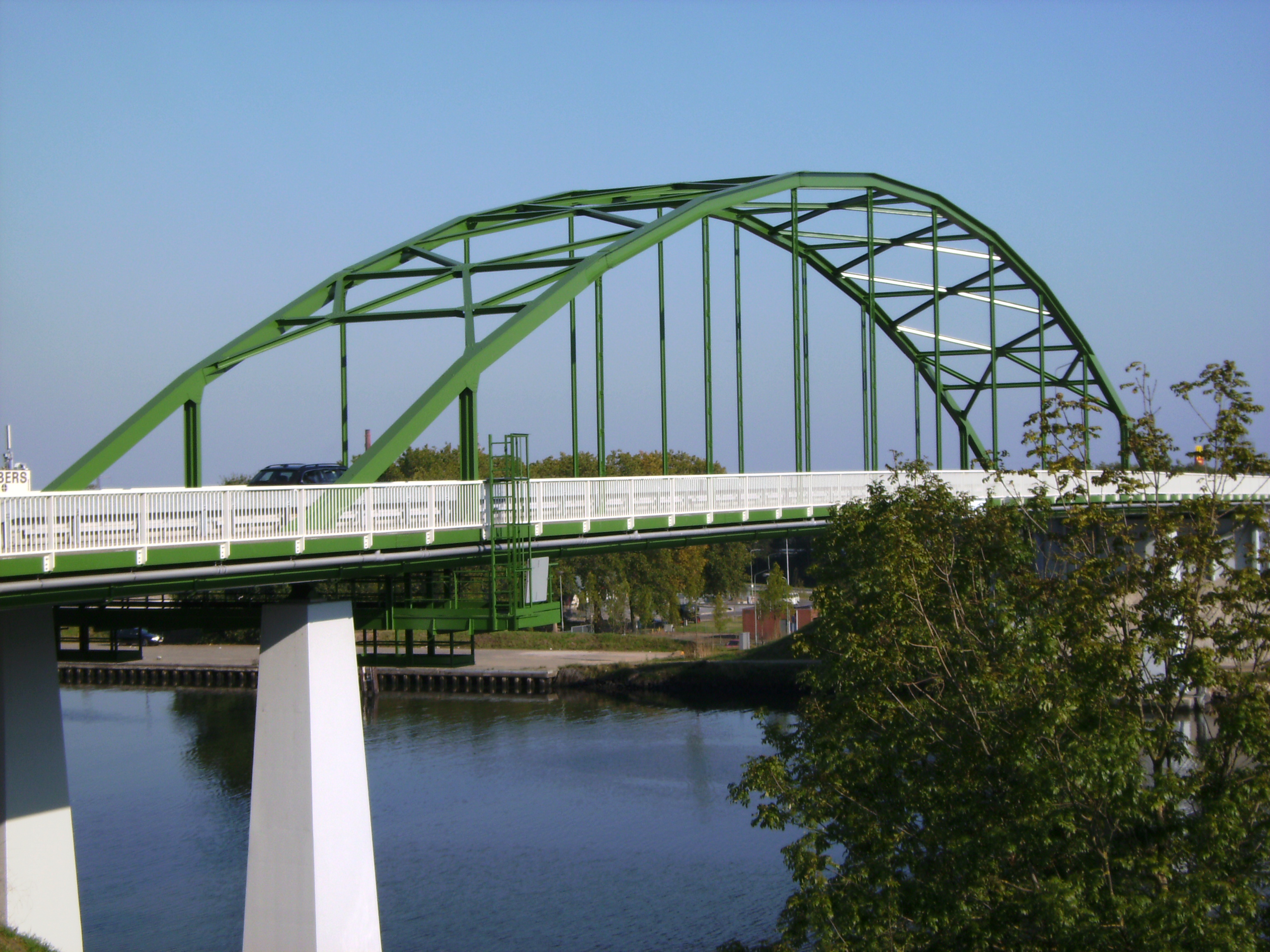
Ohé en Laak, bridge across Juliana Canal

The Juliana Canal (Dutch: Julianakanaal [jyliˈjaːnaːkaːˌnaːl]; Limburgish: Julianakanaal [jyliˈjaːnɑkəˌnaːl]), named after Queen Juliana of the Netherlands, is a 36 km (22 mi) long canal in the southern Netherlands, providing a bypass of an unnavigable section of the river Meuse between Maastricht and Maasbracht. It is an important transport connection between the ports of the Rhine delta and the industrial areas of southern Limburg and southern Belgium.

== History ==
The Juliana Canal was constructed in the 1920s and 1930s, and opened in 1935. It was important for the development of coal mining in southern Limburg (terminated in the 1970s), since it is suited for larger ships than the older Zuid-Willemsvaart, which runs from 's-Hertogenbosch to Maastricht, partly through Belgium. The Juliana Canal runs parallel to the Meuse, at maximum 3 km east of the river. Between Maasbracht and Maastricht, the canal gains approximately 25 m of elevation. There are locks at Limmel (near Maastricht), Born, and Maasbracht. Until 1965, there used to be another lock near Roosteren. When the locks of Born and Maasbracht were modernized, these became unnecessary and were destroyed. There are ports at Maastricht, Stein, Born and Maasbracht. The port at Stein used to be the second large inland port in Europe, after Duisburg in Germany. This was because of the Dutch State Mines (DSM). All the coal mines the Netherlands had were in this area. Today, DSM still owns a part of the port.

During the construction of the canal, several challenges had to be overcome. Near Elsloo, the builders had to dig deep into a steep hill, called the Scharberg. At this section, the canal is built between a steep hill on one side, and the river Meuse on the other side, only 50 metres away. Here, archeologists found many teeth, dating back to the Miocene. Unlike a normal canal, the Juliana Canal was not completely dug. Because of the difference in height, the canal couldn't be built in the ground, so the constructors made huge dikes. The height of the dike can vary from none to almost 50 metres. The bottom of the canal was then covered with a thick layer of rocks, coming from the river Meuse.

In World War II, the canal had an important strategic role. In 1940, it stopped the German troops invading Flanders. This gave the Belgians more time to mobilize their army and strengthen their defence lines. When the Netherlands surrendered, the Germans built a lot of bunkers on both sides of the canal. In 1944, when the allied forces where chasing after the retreating Germans, they were also stopped by the canal, as the Germans blew up all the bridges.

After the war, almost all of the old steel arch bridges were repaired. The bridge of Elsloo, standing higher above the canal and being much longer than the other bridges, could not be replaced until the 1960s. Today, it's the only bridge (except the highway bridge to Belgium, built in the 1970s) that has no arch.

On January 27, 2004, the canal became an international news item. During the night, one of the dikes was washed away. When a man walking on the dike suddenly saw that the path in front of him had just disappeared, he called the firefighters. In the evening, the old centre of Stein was evacuated, while massive amounts of water were only held back by sandbags. After an investigation, the cause was found. An 80-year-old water supply line, which had not been in use anymore and was forgotten, but which was still under pressure, started to leak, causing the dike to erode from the inside out.

== Bibliography ==
- Smeets, Jan (2024). Het Julianakanaal in de gemeente Stein [The Julian Canal in the municipality of Stein] (in Dutch). Stein: Stichting Erfgoed Stein. ISBN 9789083427300.
