= Giorgio Jegher =

Italian long-distance runner

Personal information
- Nationality: Italian
- Born: 28 August 1937 Rome, Italy
- Died: 20 January 1997 (aged 59)

Sport
- Sport: Long-distance running
- Event: Marathon

Giorgio Jegher (28 August 1937 – 20 January 1997) was an Italian long-distance runner. He competed in the marathon at the 1964 Summer Olympics.
