= Running Strong for American Indian Youth =

American non-profit organization

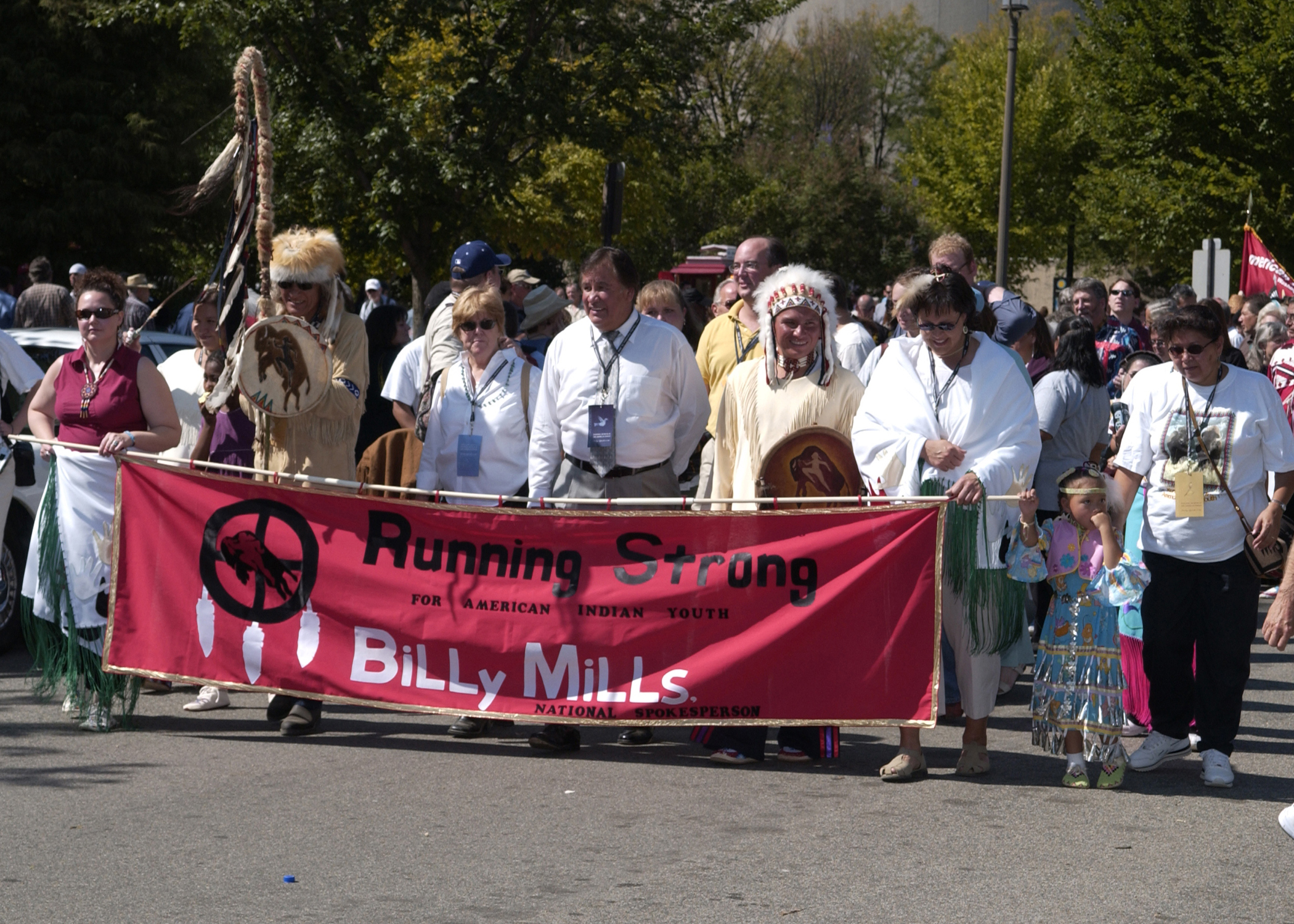
- Washington, DC, September 21, 2004 -- Billy Mills. Running Strong for American Indian Youth. One of the many organizations marching to celebrate the opening of the National Museum of the American Indian. FEMA NewsPhoto/Bill Koplitz
- Formation: 1986; 40 years ago
- Founder: Billy Mills and Gene Krizek
- Type: Non-profit organization
- Purpose: To help Native American people meet their immediate survival needs – food, water, and shelter – while implementing and supporting programs designed to create opportunities for self-sufficiency and self-esteem
- Website: Official Site

Running Strong for American Indian Youth, or just Running Strong, is a non-profit organization that was co-founded by Olympic Gold Medalist Billy Mills, along with Gene Krizek, founder of Christian Relief Services Charities. Running Strong, also known as American Indian Youth Running Strong, Inc., operates under the umbrella of Christian Relief Services Charities with the mission "to help American Indian people meet their immediate survival needs – food, water, and shelter – while implementing and supporting programs designed to create opportunities for self-sufficiency and self-esteem."

== History ==
Running Strong for American Indian Youth was co-founded in 1986 by Gene Krizek, and Billy Mills (Oglala Lakota), the only American to have won a gold medal in the 10,000 meter race, which he won at the 1964 Tokyo Summer Games. Mills, who serves as Running Strong's national spokesperson, founded the charity as a "giveaway" to give back to the community that supported his success, following Lakota tradition. Mills was awarded the 2012 Presidential Citizens Medal by Barack Obama, the second-highest civilian award in the United States, in recognition of his service to help American Indian families through Running Strong for American Indian Youth.

Running Strong is governed by a five-member, Native American-majority Board of Directors. Its work began primarily in the Pine Ridge Indian Reservation to address the lack of clean, running water, as well in the Rosebud Indian Reservation, and the Cheyenne River Indian Reservation, all in South Dakota. Running Strong started its work with programs focused on food and nutrition, women's health, education, and seasonal needs. Gradually, its services expanded to serve other American Indian communities. However, Running Strong has continued to do much of its work on Pine Ridge Indian Reservation, where Billy Mills grew up.

== Programs ==
Running Strong for American Indian Youth currently supports programs within 8 areas of work:

- Basic needs – Running Strong provides items such as new coats, shoes, blankets, and hygiene kits to American Indian families in need.
- Safe housing – Running Strong helps American Indian families get safe housing in areas that are overcrowded, underserved, and where housing is unaffordable.
- Culture and language – Running Strong helps American Indians keep their traditional cultures and languages alive for future generations.
- Organic gardens and food – Running Strong runs gardening and food programs that bring healthy meals as well as fresh fruits and vegetables to isolated, impoverished areas in Indian Country.
- Schools & youth centers – Running Strong helps communities develop youth centers to provide safe, positive spaces and healthy activities for American Indian children and teenagers.
- Seasonal programs – Running Strong helps facilitate seasonal programs that serve American Indian families during holidays and other special occasions, such as turkey dinner donations, toy drives, holiday dinner parties, and cultural gatherings.
- Emergency assistance programs – Running Strong helps American Indian families deal with severe weather, by providing assistance with heat and other utilities.
- Women and children's health – Running Strong supports programs that help American Indian women and children lead healthy lives, and that help women feel pride for their cultural identities.

== Other work ==
Since 2004, Running Strong has been a charity partner of the Marine Corps Marathon in Washington, DC. Running Strong's Marine Corps Marathon Team, Team Running Strong, was created when Billy Mills served as an official starter for the marathon in 2004.

In 2006, Running Strong joined with six other Native-focused nonprofit organizations to found the Native Ways Federation. Native Ways gives donors a way to support Native-focused organizations, and assures donors that their donations are going to nonprofits working effectively to support Native communities, live up to ethical standards, and observe fiscal responsibility
