= Nikolay Tikhomirov =

Soviet long-distance runner

Personal information
- Nationality: Soviet
- Born: 21 December 1930 Leningrad, Soviet Union
- Died: 1987 (aged 56–57)

Sport
- Sport: Long-distance running
- Event: Marathon

Nikolay Tikhomirov (21 December 1930 – 1987) was a Soviet long-distance runner. He competed in the marathon at the 1964 Summer Olympics.
