= Obbicht en Papenhoven =

Coordinates: 51.03454°N 5.782242°E

Obbicht en Papenhoven (Dutch pronunciation: [ˈɔbɪxt ɛm ˈpaːpə(n)ˌɦoːvə(n)], Limburgish: Opbeech en Papenhaove [ˈɔbeːɣ æm ˈpaːpə(n)ˌɦɔː˦və]) is a former municipality in the Dutch province of Limburg. It consisted of the villages Obbicht and Papenhoven, located on the river Meuse about 8 km northwest of Sittard.

Obbicht en Papenhoven merged with the municipality of Born in 1982. A small part merged with Stein.
