= Teruo Funai =

Japanese long-distance runner

Personal information
- Nationality: Japanese
- Born: 28 April 1938 (age 88)

Sport
- Sport: Long-distance running
- Event: 10,000 metres

Teruo Funai (船井 照夫, Funai Teruo; born 28 April 1938) is a Japanese long-distance runner. He competed in the men's 10,000 metres at the 1964 Summer Olympics.
