= Kazumi Watanabe (runner) =

Japanese long-distance runner (1935–2022)

Personal information
- Native name: 渡辺 和己
- Nationality: Japanese
- Born: 25 December 1935 Fukuoka, Japan
- Died: 21 April 2022 (aged 86)

Sport
- Sport: Long-distance running
- Event(s): Marathon, 10,000 meters

Kazumi Watanabe (渡辺 和己, Watanabe Kazumi; 25 December 1935 – 21 April 2022) was a Japanese long-distance runner. He was diminutive, weighing 115 pounds and standing 5'5". He competed in the marathon at the 1960 Summer Olympics, finishing 32nd in 2:29:45, and in the 1964 Summer Olympics in the 10,000 meter run, finishing 28th in 31.00.6. His personal bests for the marathon were 2:15:40 while winning the Beppu marathon, and the 10,000 meters in 29:10.4 on the track, both run in 1963. His best time for 10 miles on the roads was 50:31 in 1957 when he was 21 years old.
