= Born, Netherlands =

Born
- Village
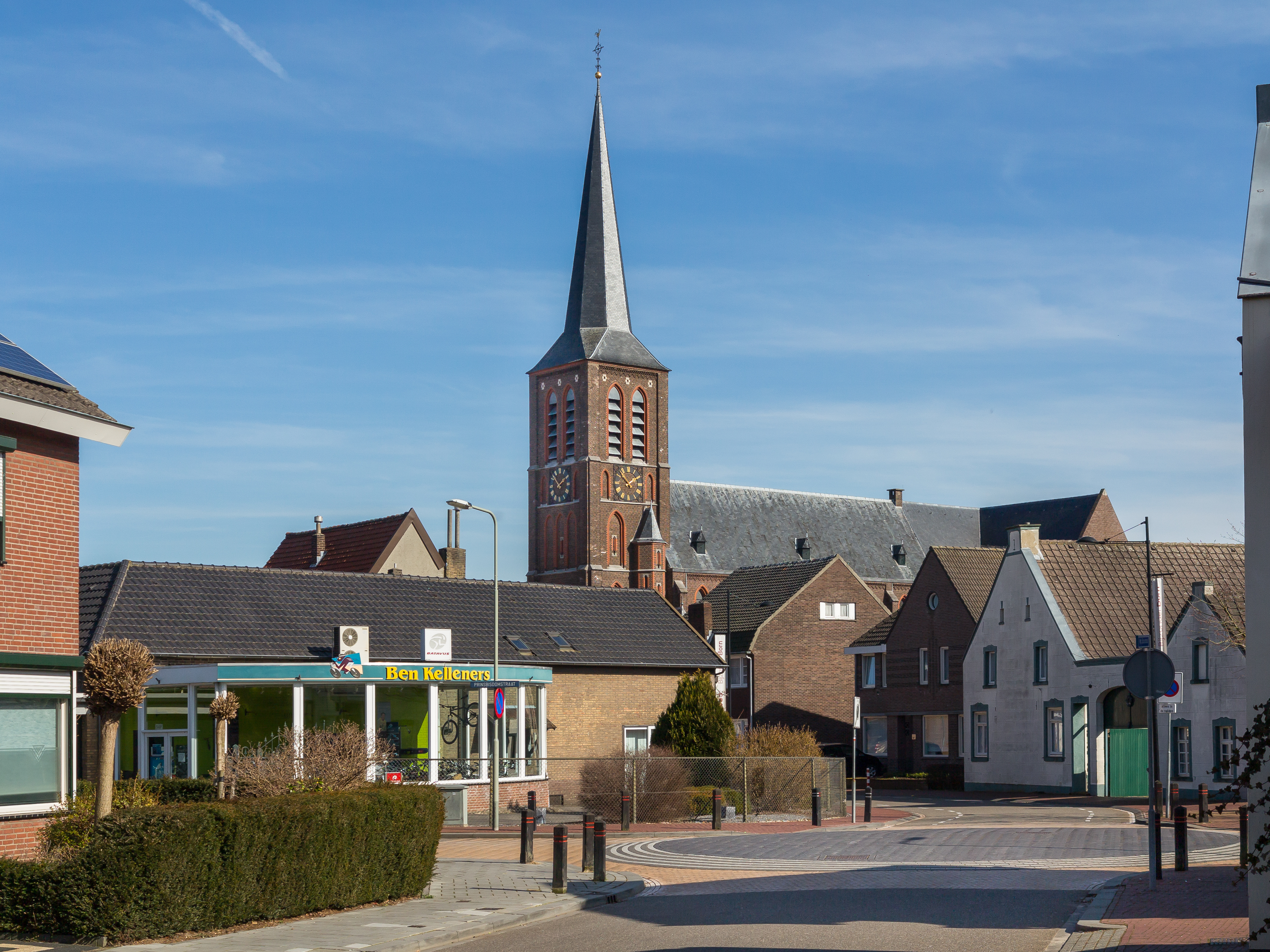
- Church: de Kerk Sint Martinuskerk

- Flag Coat of arms

- Location in the Netherlands Location in the province of Limburg in the Netherlands
- Coordinates: 51°02′00″N 5°48′40″E
- Country: Netherlands
- Province: Limburg
- Municipality: Sittard-Geleen

Area
  - Total: 1.51 km^{2} (0.58 sq mi)
- Elevation: 39 m (128 ft)

Population (2021)
  - Total: 2,405
  - Density: 1,590/km^{2} (4,130/sq mi)
- Time zone: UTC+1 (CET)
  - Summer (DST): UTC+2 (CEST)
- Postal code: 6120-6121
- Dialing code: 046
- Major roads: A2, N297

Born (Dutch: [ˈbɔr(ə)n]; Limburgish: Bor [bɔʀ]) is a village in the Dutch municipality of Sittard-Geleen. It has a port on the Julianakanaal (Juliana canal) and has a zoo. Born is also the site of the car factory VDL Nedcar and the headquarters and European Distribution Center of Mitsubishi Motors Europe.

Until 2001, Born was a separate municipality (population about 15,000), that included the villages Born, Buchten, Holtum, Grevenbicht, Papenhoven and Obbicht.

== See also ==
- 82nd Armored Reconnaissance Battalion helped with liberation of Born on 19 September 1944.
- Obbicht en Papenhoven

== Gallery ==
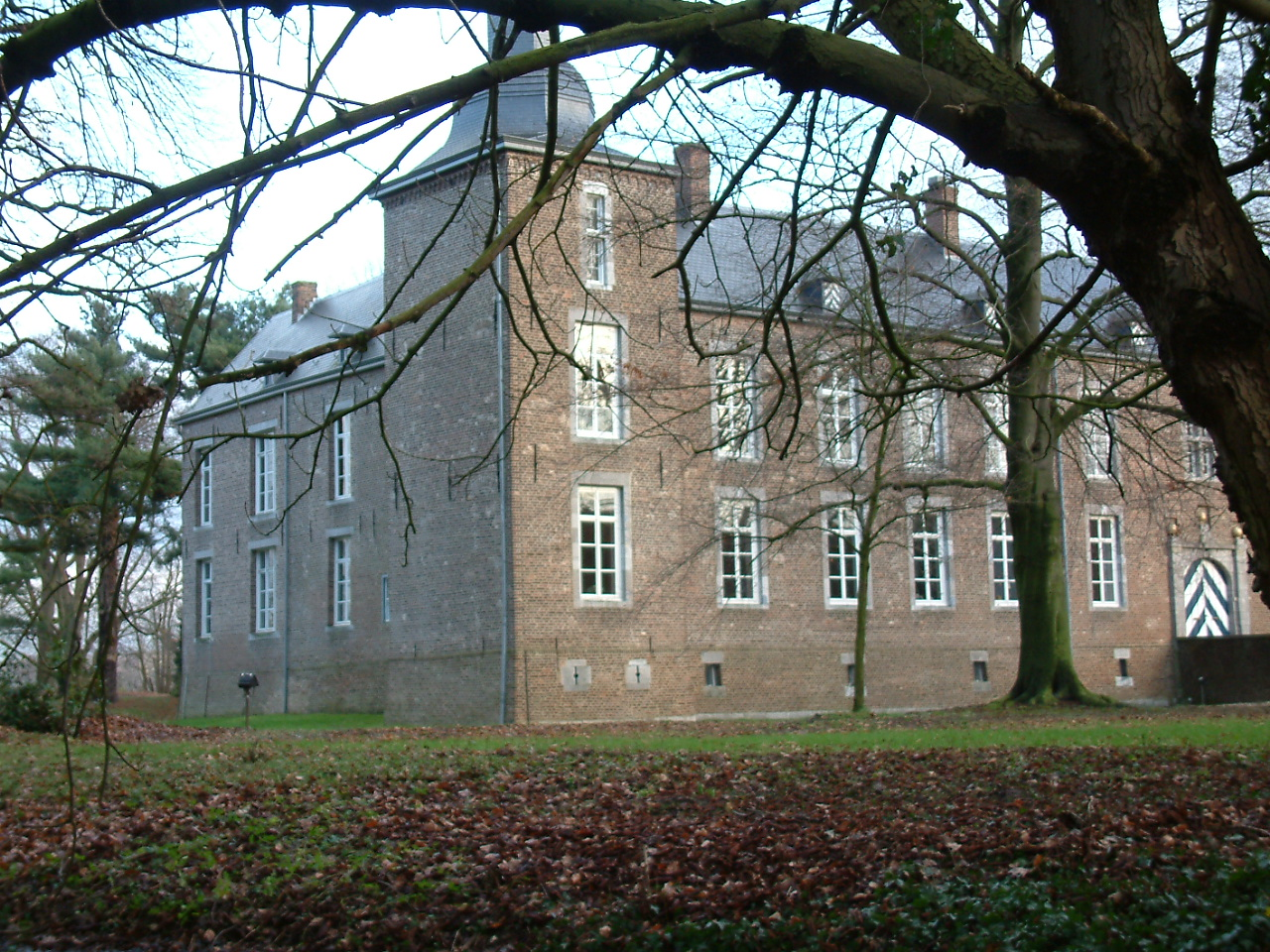
Wolfrath Castle

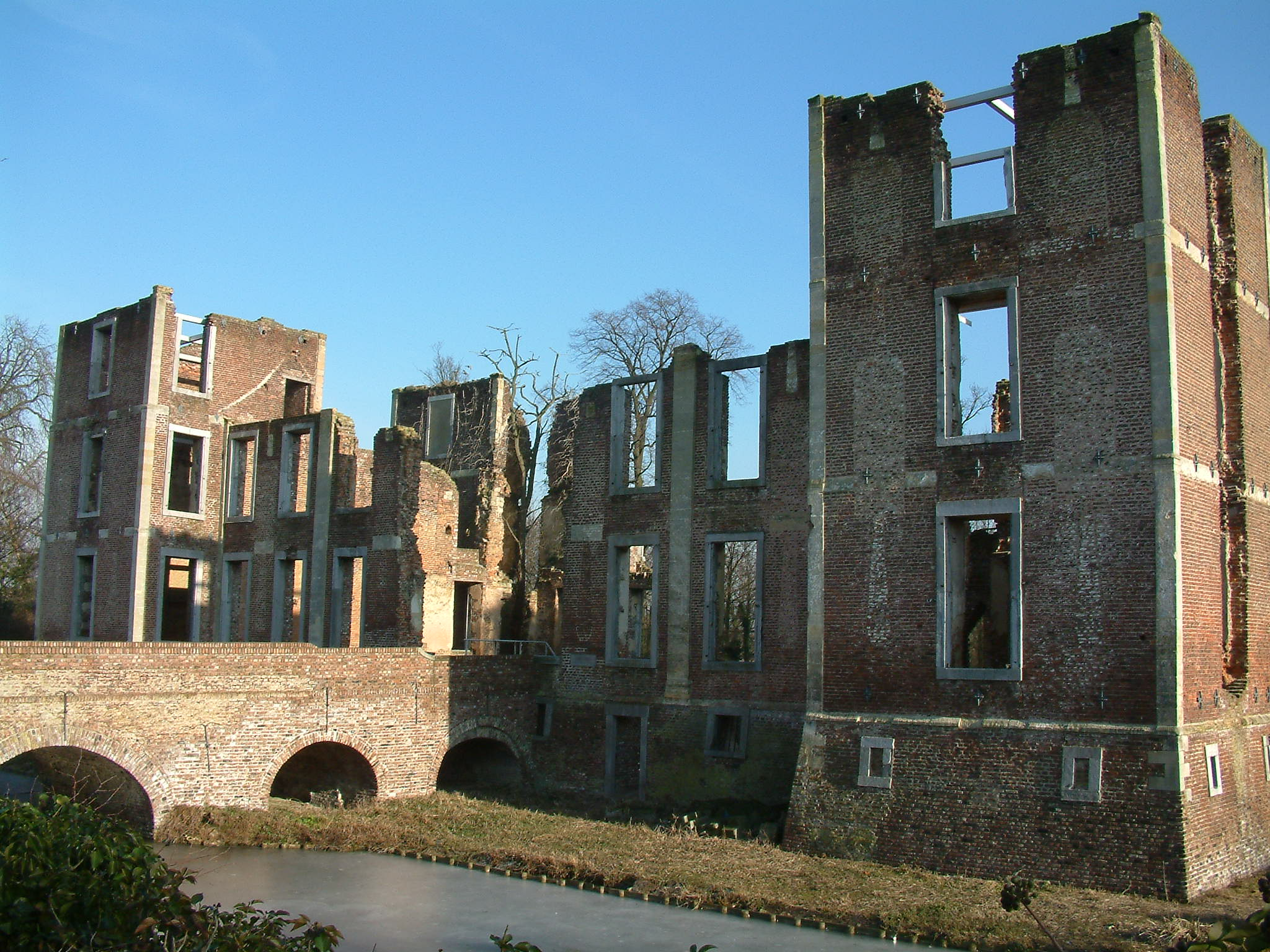
Ruins of Born Castle

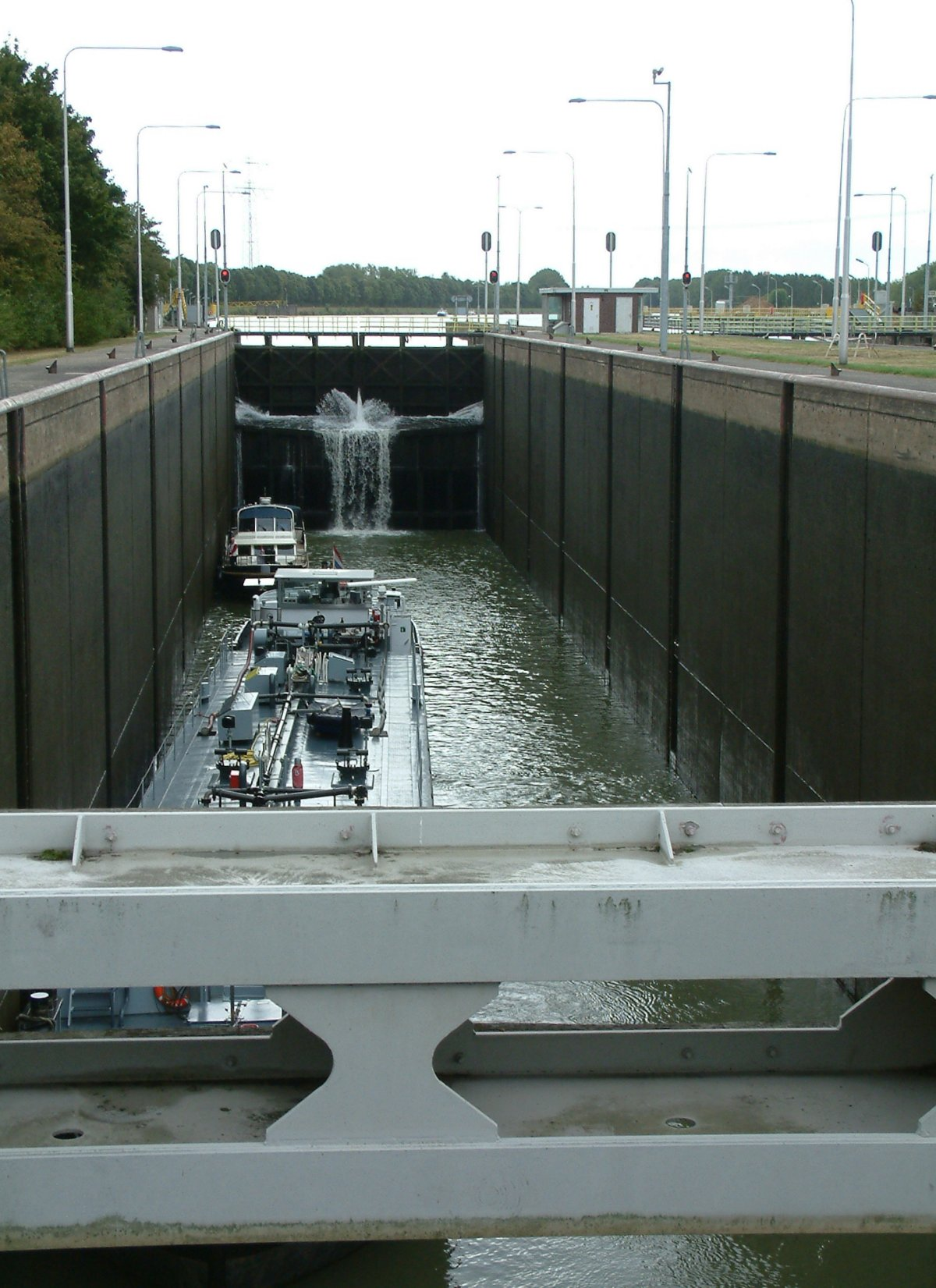
Lock in Born
