= Fornes Chapel =

- Fornes kapell
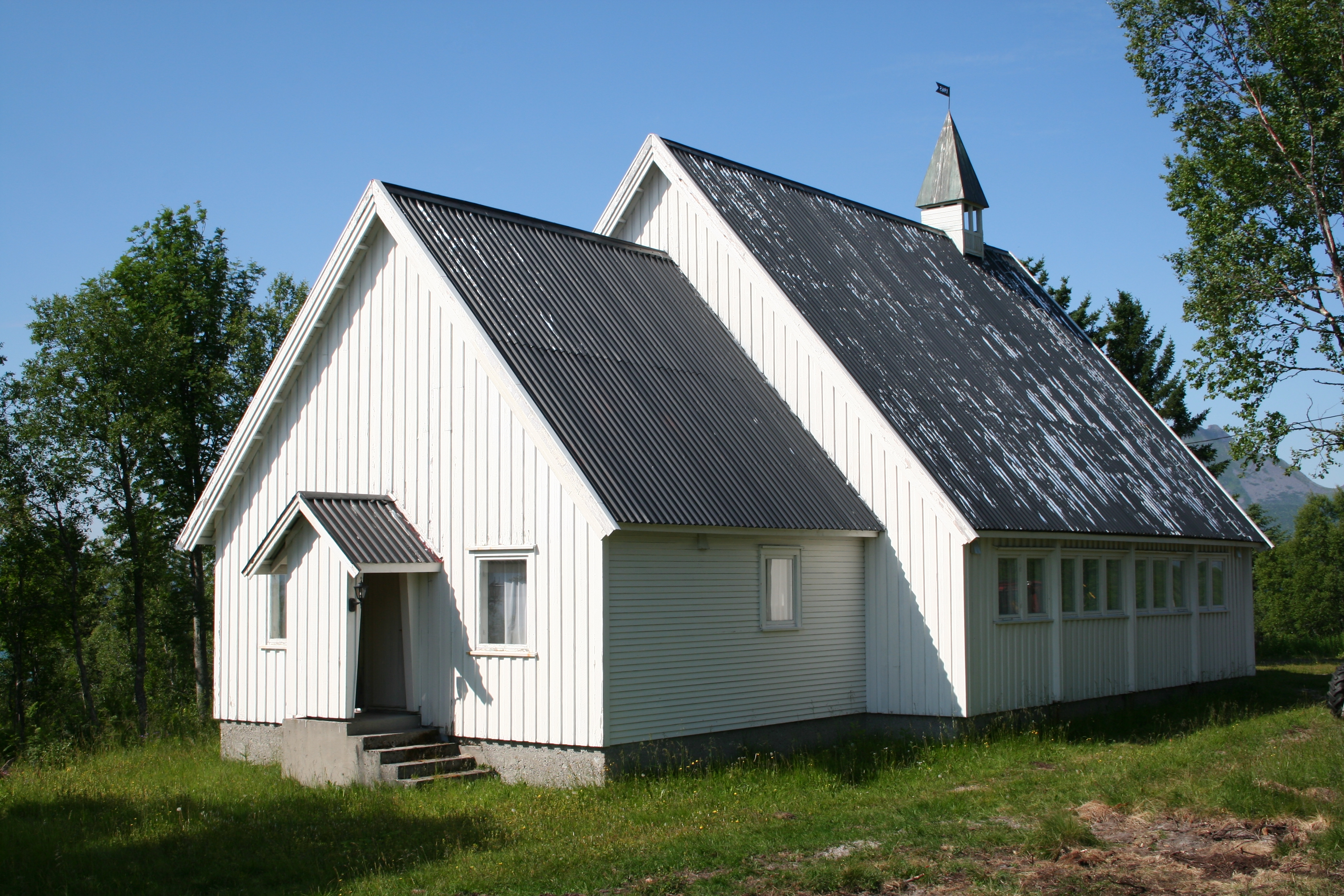
- View of the chapel
- Fornes Chapel
- 68.8577286°N 15.55913507°E
- Location: Andøy Municipality, Nordland
- Country: Norway
- Denomination: Church of Norway
- Churchmanship: Evangelical Lutheran

History
- Status: Chapel
- Consecrated: August 1965

Architecture
- Functional status: Active
- Architectural type: Long church
- Completed: 1965 (61 years ago)

Specifications
- Capacity: 120
- Materials: Wood

Administration
- Diocese: Sør-Hålogaland
- Deanery: Vesterålen prosti
- Parish: Andøy
- Norwegian Cultural Heritage Site
- Type: Church
- Status: Not protected
- ID: 84181

Fornes Chapel (Norwegian: Fornes kapell) is a chapel of the Church of Norway in Andøy Municipality in Nordland county, Norway. It is an annex chapel, located in the village of Fornes on the island of Hinnøya, in the Andøy parish of the Lofoten prosti (deanery) in the Diocese of Sør-Hålogaland. White and wooden, it was built in a long church style in 1965 and seats about 120 people.

== See also ==
- List of churches in Sør-Hålogaland
