= Oskar Leupi =

Swiss long-distance runner (1932–2020)

Personal information
- Nationality: Swiss
- Born: 17 November 1932
- Died: 22 January 2020 (aged 87)

Sport
- Sport: Long-distance running
- Event: Marathon

Oskar Leupi (17 November 1932 – 22 January 2020) was a Swiss long-distance runner. He competed in the marathon at the 1964 Summer Olympics.
