= Fornes (surname) =

Fornes or Fornés is a surname. Notable people with the surname include:

- Abraham Fornés (born 1939), Puerto Rican long-distance runner
- Buddy Fornes (1931–1983), American football player
- Charles V. Fornes, American politician
- Luis Barahona Fornés, Chilean politician
- María Irene Fornés (1930–2018), Cuban-American playwright and director
- Miguel Ángel Fornés (born 1993), Spanish volleyball player
- Óscar Fornés (born 1983), Spanish footballer
- Paula Montal Fornés (1799–1889), Spanish Catholic nun
- Sverre Fornes (1932–2021), Norwegian football player
