= Jim Hogan (athlete) =

Irish distance runner (1933–2015)

Personal information
- Nationality: Irish
- Born: 28 May 1933 Croom, Limerick, Ireland
- Died: 10 January 2015 (aged 81) Limerick, Ireland
- Height: 175 cm (5 ft 9 in)
- Weight: 69 kg (152 lb)

Sport
- Sport: Athletics
- Event: long distance
- Club: Walton AC
Medal record
Men's athletics
Representing Great Britain
European Championships
Gold medal – first place	1966 Budapest	Marathon

James Joseph Hogan (né Cregan; 28 May 1933 – 10 January 2015) was an Irish distance runner who competed for both Ireland and Great Britain. He was born in Croom, County Limerick, Ireland. Hogan's athletic career saw him compete for Ireland at the 1964 Summer Olympics in Tokyo and for Great Britain at the 1968 Summer Olympics in Mexico City. He was also the only Irish athlete to win the European marathon title.

== Biography ==
Hogan was born as Jim Cregan in [Athlacca, County Limerick], Ireland in May 1933. In his youth, he had some success in cross-country running in Ireland. However, he initially retired from the sport at the age of 26, and moved to England in 1960. Once in England, he took up running again, and changed his surname by deed poll from Cregan to Hogan, with the goal of competing in running events in England. While running in England, his performances were noticed by selectors for the Irish Olympic team, who picked him to compete at the 1964 Summer Olympics.

Hogan competed at two Olympic Games. At the 1964 Summer Olympics in Tokyo, Hogan represented Ireland in the men's 10,000 metres and the men's marathon, but did not finish either race. Despite not finishing in the marathon, Hogan kept pace with the eventual winner, Abebe Bikila, until he was forced to withdraw from the race due to dehydration.

Hogan felt both disillusioned and discriminated against for being an Irish athlete living in England, so he switched to compete for Great Britain. He won the marathon title at the 1966 European Championships. Two years later, at the 1968 Summer Olympics in Mexico City, Hogan represented Great Britain in the men's 10,000 metres, where he finished in 26th place.

After setting multiple World and European distance records in athletics, he returned to live in County Limerick to train horses. He died there in January 2015, at the age of 81. A biography of his life, titled "The Irishman who ran for England" was published before he died.
