= Manfred Naumann =

German long-distance runner

Personal information
- Nationality: German
- Born: 21 June 1933 (age 93) Stein, Netherlands

Sport
- Sport: Long-distance running
- Event: Marathon

Manfred Naumann (born 21 June 1933) is a German long-distance runner. He competed in the marathon at the 1964 Summer Olympics.
