= Siegfried Rothe =

German long-distance runner (born 1938)

Personal information
- Nationality: German
- Born: 18 January 1938 (age 88)

Sport
- Sport: Long-distance running
- Event: 10,000 metres

Siegfried Rothe (born 18 January 1938) is a German long-distance runner. He competed in the men's 10,000 metres at the 1964 Summer Olympics.
