= Ju Hyeong-gyeol =

South Korean long-distance runner

Personal information
- Nationality: South Korean
- Born: 20 August 1939 (age 86)

Sport
- Sport: Long-distance running
- Event: Marathon

Ju Hyeong-gyeol (born 20 August 1939) is a South Korean long-distance runner. He competed in the marathon at the 1964 Summer Olympics.

He later became executive director of the Korea Association of Athletics Federations.
