= Chrisantus Nyakwayo =

Kenyan long-distance runner

Personal information
- Nationality: Kenyan
- Born: 1944 (age 81–82)

Sport
- Sport: Long-distance running
- Event: Marathon

Chrisantus Nyakwayo (born 1944) is a Kenyan long-distance runner. He competed in the marathon at the 1964 Summer Olympics.
