= Fornes, Nordland =

Village in Andøy Municipality, Norway

Fornes
- Village
- Interactive map of Fornes
- Location within Nordland Location within Norway
- Coordinates: 68.8627°N 15.5559°E
- Country: Norway
- Region: Northern Norway
- County: Nordland
- District: Vesterålen
- Municipality: Andøy Municipality
- Elevation: 7 m (23 ft)
- Time zone: UTC+01:00 (CET)
  - Summer (DST): UTC+02:00 (CEST)
- Post Code: 8484 Risøyhamn

Fornes is a village in Andøy Municipality in Nordland county, Norway. The village is located on the northeastern part of the large island of Hinnøya, at the confluence of the Risøysundet, Sortlandssundet, and Gavlfjorden. The village is the home of Fornes Chapel.
