= Guido Vögele =

Swiss long-distance runner

Personal information
- Nationality: Swiss
- Born: 17 November 1937 (age 88)

Sport
- Sport: Long-distance running
- Event: Marathon

Guido Vögele (born 17 November 1937) is a Swiss long-distance runner. He competed in the marathon at the 1964 Summer Olympics.
