= Abe Fornés =

Puerto Rican long-distance runner

Personal information
- Nationality: Puerto Rican
- Born: Abe Alah Fornés Santiago; 21 September 1939 Peñuelas, Puerto Rico
- Died: October 1978

Sport
- Sport: Long-distance running
- Event: Marathon

Abe Fornés (21 September 1939 – October 1978) was a Puerto Rican long-distance runner. He was the first Puerto Rican to compete in the marathon at the 1964 Summer Olympics.
