= Lee Sang-hoon (athlete) =

South Korean long-distance runner

Personal information
- Nationality: South Korean
- Born: 30 September 1938 (age 87) Chungcheongbuk, South Korea

Sport
- Sport: Long-distance running
- Event: Marathon

Lee Sang-hoon (Korean: 이상훈, born 30 September 1938) is a South Korean long-distance runner. He competed in the marathon at the 1964 Summer Olympics and the 1968 Summer Olympics.
