= Heinrich Hagen =

German long-distance runner (born 1935)

Personal information
- Nationality: German
- Born: 7 December 1935 (age 90) Rostock, Germany

Sport
- Sport: Long-distance running
- Event: Marathon

Heinrich Hagen (born 7 December 1935) is a German long-distance runner. He competed in the marathon at the 1964 Summer Olympics.
