= Jean Aniset =

Luxembourgish long-distance runner (1934–2024)

Personal information
- Nationality: Luxembourgish
- Born: 15 September 1934 Dudelange, Luxembourg
- Died: 4 June 2024 (aged 89)

Sport
- Sport: Long-distance running
- Event: Marathon

Jean Aniset (15 September 1934 – 4 June 2024) was a Luxembourgish long-distance runner. He competed in the marathon at the 1964 Summer Olympics. Aniset died on 4 June 2024, at the age of 89.
