= Nikolay Abramov (athlete) =

Soviet long-distance runner 1933–2003

Personal information
- Nationality: Soviet
- Born: 10 December 1933 (age 92) Trushnino, Soviet Union
- Died: 2003

Sport
- Sport: Long-distance running
- Event: Marathon

Nikolay Kuzmich Abramov (10 December 1933 – 2003) was a Soviet long-distance runner. He competed in the marathon at the 1964 Summer Olympics.
