= Aurèle Vandendriessche =

Belgian marathon runner (1932–2023)

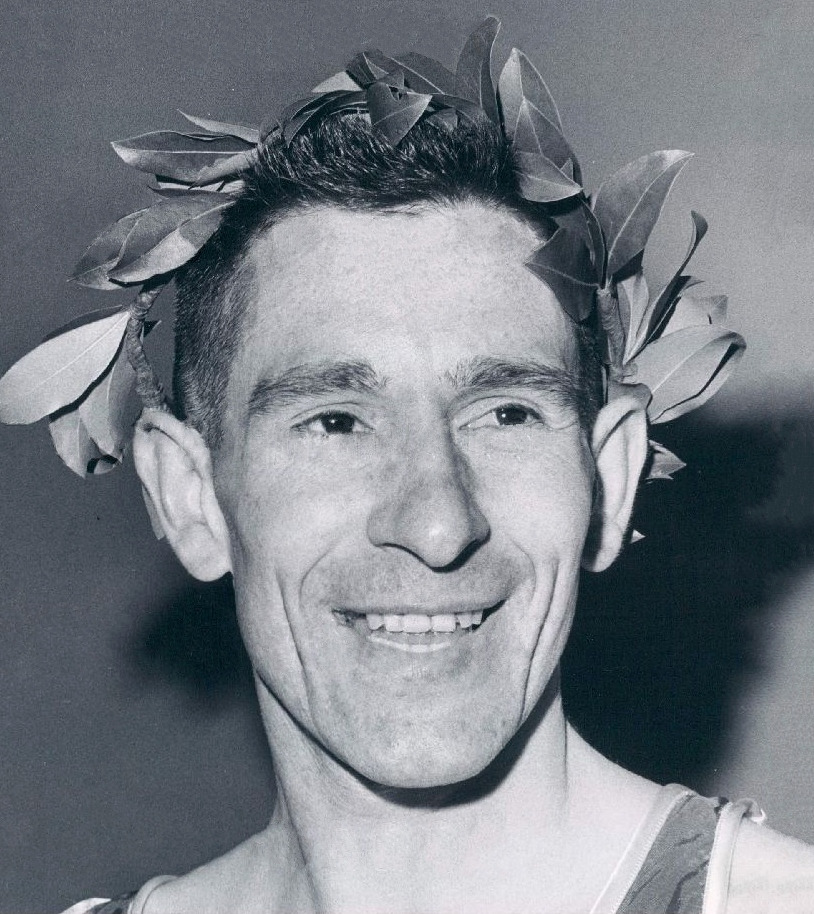
- Vandendriessche in 1964

Personal information
- Born: 4 July 1932 Anzegem, Belgium
- Died: 17 October 2023 (aged 91) Waregem, Belgium
- Height: 173 cm (5 ft 8 in)
- Weight: 60 kg (132 lb)

Sport
- Sport: Athletics
- Event: Marathon
- Club: Waregem AC

Achievements and titles
- Personal best: 2:17:44 (1965)
Medal record
Men's athletics
Representing Belgium
European Championships
| Silver medal – second place | 1962 Belgrade | Marathon |
| Silver medal – second place | 1966 Budapest | Marathon |

Aurèle Vandendriessche (4 July 1932 – 17 October 2023) was a Belgian marathon runner, who won silver medals at the 1962 and 1966 European Championships. He competed at the 1956, 1960, and 1964 Summer Olympics with the best result of seventh place in 1964. Twice winner of the Boston Marathon (1963 and 1964), he recorded his best time there, 2:17:44 in 1965, while finishing fourth.

At the 1960 Summer Olympics in Rome, Abebe Bikila, followed barefoot at the rear of the lead pack, which was moving at a scorching pace and included Arthur Keily, Bakir Benaïssa, Rhadi Ben Abdesselam who was the reigning world cross-country champion, Bertie Messitt, the marathon world record holder Sergey Popov, and Vandendriessche. Bikila won, setting a world record at 2:15:16.2. After they dispatched the rest of the field by 25 kilometers, Abdesselam stayed with Bikila until the final 500 meters, finishing second in 2:15:41.6. Vandendriessche abandoned the race. He placed seventh at the 1964 Summer Olympics in Tokyo, where Bikila won again with a new world record.

Vandendriessche died in Waregem on 17 October 2023, at the age of 91.

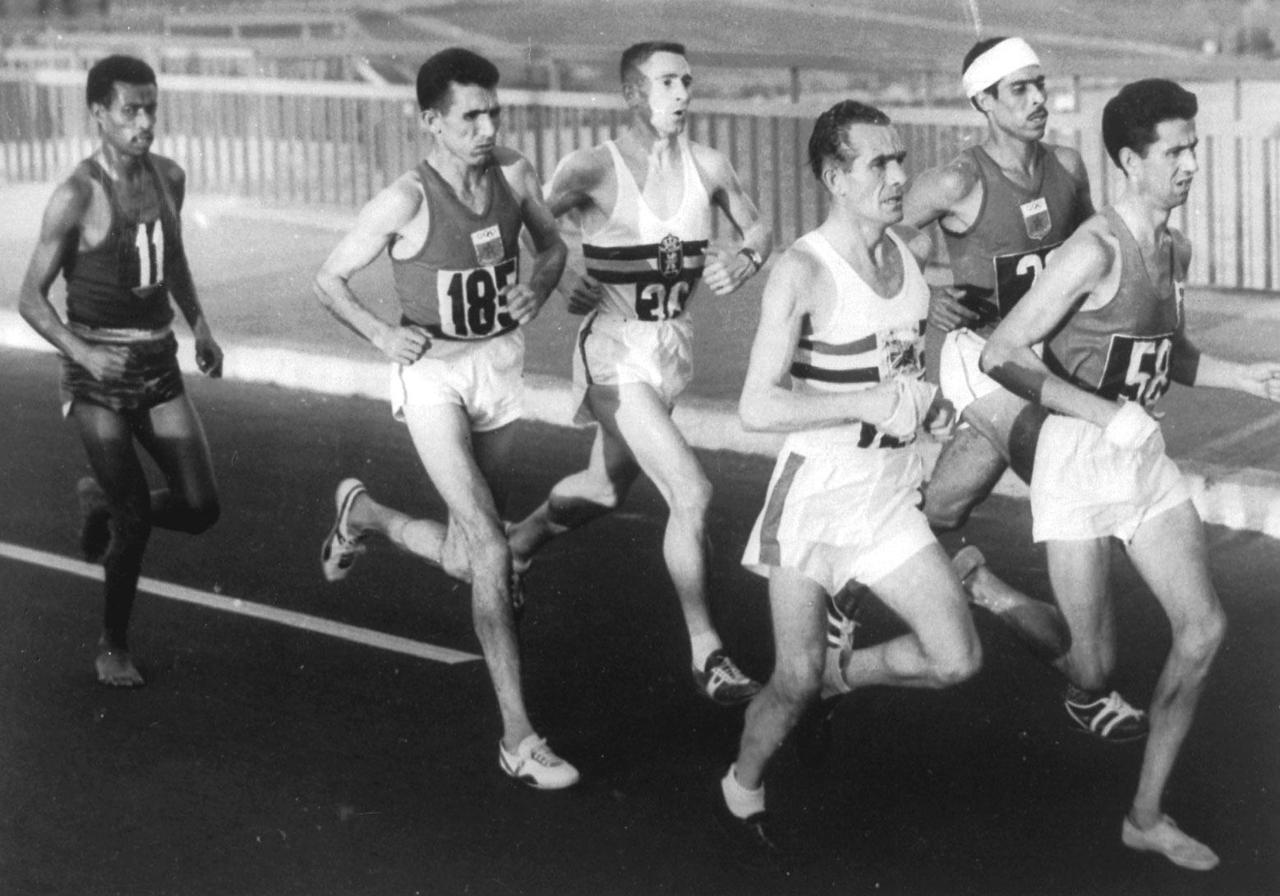
The 1960 lead pack near the 10 km (6 mi) mark, Abebe (#11), following Messitt (#58), Benaïssa (white headband), Keily (#46) who faded to 25th, Vandendriessche (#36), and ben Abdesselam (#185).

== Achievements ==
| Year | Competition | Venue | Position | Event | Notes |
Representing Belgium
| 1962 | European Championships | Belgrade, Yugoslavia | 2nd | Marathon | 2:24:02.0 |
| 1963 | Boston Marathon | Boston, United States | 1st | Marathon | 2:18:58 |
| 1964 | Boston Marathon | Boston, United States | 1st | Marathon | 2:19:59 |
| 1965 | Enschede Marathon | Enschede, Netherlands | 1st | Marathon | 2:21:16 |
| 1965 | Košice Peace Marathon | Košice, Czechoslovakia | 1st | Marathon | 2:23:47 |
| 1966 | European Championships | Budapest, Hungary | 2nd | Marathon | 2:21:43.6 |
