= Billy Mills =

American Olympic athlete (born 1938)

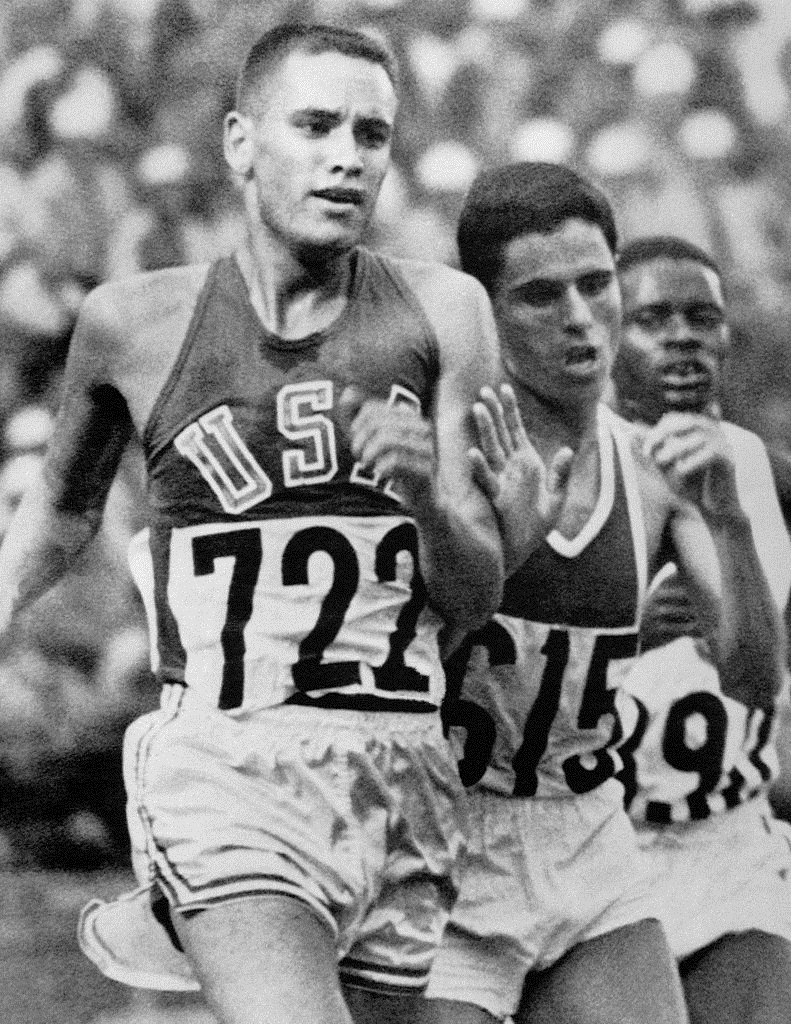
- Mills (left) and Gammoudi at the 1964 Olympics

Personal information
- Native name: Tamakhóčhe Theȟíla
- Full name: William Mervin Mills
- Nationality: Oglala Sioux Tribe, American
- Born: June 30, 1938 (age 88) Pine Ridge, South Dakota, U.S.
- Education: Haskell Institute; University of Kansas
- Height: 180 cm (5 ft 11 in)
- Weight: 68 kg (150 lb)

Sport
- Sport: Athletics
- Club: U.S. Marine Corps

Achievements and titles
- Personal bests: 5000m: 13:41.4; 10,000m: 28:17.6; Marathon: 2:22:56
Medal record
Men's athletics
Representing the United States
Olympic Games
Gold medal – first place	1964 Tokyo	10,000 m

William Mervin Mills (born June 30, 1938), also known by his Oglala Lakota name Tamakhóčhe Theȟíla, is an American Oglala Lakota former track and field athlete who won a gold medal in the 10,000 metre run (6.2 mi) at the 1964 Tokyo Olympics. His 1964 victory is considered one of the greatest Olympic upsets because he was a virtual unknown going into the event. He was the first non-European to win the Olympic event and remains the only winner from the Americas. He was also a United States Marine officer.

== Early life and education ==
William Mervin Mills was born in Pine Ridge, South Dakota, and was raised on the Pine Ridge Indian Reservation for Oglala Lakota people. His Lakota name, Tamakhóčhe Theȟíla, loosely means "loves his country" or "respects the earth." He was orphaned when he was twelve years old. Mills took up running while attending the Haskell Institute, which is now known as Haskell Indian Nations University in Lawrence, Kansas where he won the 1956 KSHSAA Class B State Championship in Cross Country. Mills was both a boxer and a runner in his youth, but he gave up boxing to focus on running.

He attended the University of Kansas on an athletic scholarship and was a three-time NCAA All-America cross-country runner. In 1960 he won the individual title at the Big Eight cross-country championship. While he competed at Kansas, the track team won the 1959 and 1960 outdoor national championships.

After graduating in 1962 with a degree in physical education, Mills entered the United States Marine Corps. He was a first lieutenant in the Marine Corps Reserve when he competed in the 1964 Olympics.

According to some sources, Mills never owned his own pair of new shoes until the night before the Olympic Games.

== 1964 Olympics ==
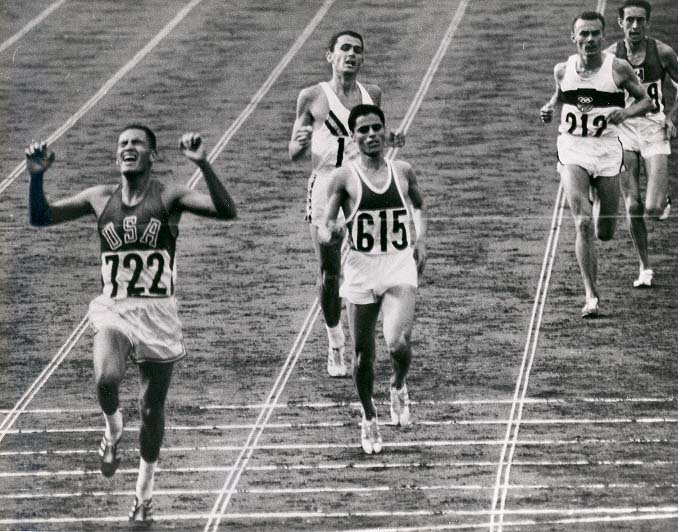
Billy Mills breaks the tape in the 10,000 m in the 1964 Olympics.

Mills qualified for the 1964 Summer Olympics on the U.S. Track and Field Team in the 10,000 metres and the marathon. The favorite in 1964 for the 10,000 m was Ron Clarke of Australia, who held the world record. The runners expected to challenge him were defending champion Pyotr Bolotnikov of the Soviet Union, and Murray Halberg of New Zealand, who had won the 5,000 m in 1960.

Mills was largely unknown as a runner. He had finished second to Gerry Lindgren in the U.S. Olympic trials. His time in the heats was a minute slower than Clarke's. Clarke set the tone of the race by using a tactic of surging every other lap. Halfway through the race, only four runners were still with Clarke: Mohammed Gammoudi of Tunisia, Mamo Wolde of Ethiopia, Kokichi Tsuburaya of Japan, and Mills. Tsuburaya, the local favorite, lost contact first, then Wolde. With two laps to go, only two runners were still with Clarke. He had run a world record time of 28:15.6, while neither Gammoudi nor Mills had previously run under 29 minutes.

Mills and Clarke were running together, with Gammoudi immediately behind, as they entered the final lap. They were lapping other runners, and Clarke was boxed in down the backstretch. He pushed Mills once, then again. Then Gammoudi pushed them both and surged into the lead as they rounded the final curve. Clarke recovered and began chasing Gammoudi while Mills appeared to be too far back to be in contention. Clarke failed to catch Gammoudi, but Mills pulled out to lane 4 and sprinted past them both. His winning time of 28:24.4 was almost 50 seconds faster than he had run before and set a new Olympic record for the event. No American had before won the 10,000 m, nor has any other American come close until Galen Rupp took the silver in the 2012 London Olympics.

American television viewers were able to hear the surprise and drama as NBC expert analyst Dick Bank screamed "Look at Mills! Look at Mills!" over the more sedate play-by-play announcer Bud Palmer, who seemed to miss what was unfolding. For bringing drama to the coverage, Bank was fired, as it was considered improper at the time.

After the race, Mills talked with Clarke and asked if he was straining as hard as he could on the final straight to the finish, to which Clarke replied, "Yes". Mills has stated that he tried to be relaxed during his final kick to the finish line and felt that helped him pass both Gammoudi and Clarke. Both Clarke and Mills ran the marathon after the 10,000 m event. Clarke finished in 9th place, and Mills finished in 14th, in 2:22:55.4, approximately two-and-a-half minutes behind Clarke, six-and-a-half minutes behind bronze medalist Tsuburaya and about 10 minutes behind winner Abebe Bikila.

== Post-Olympics ==
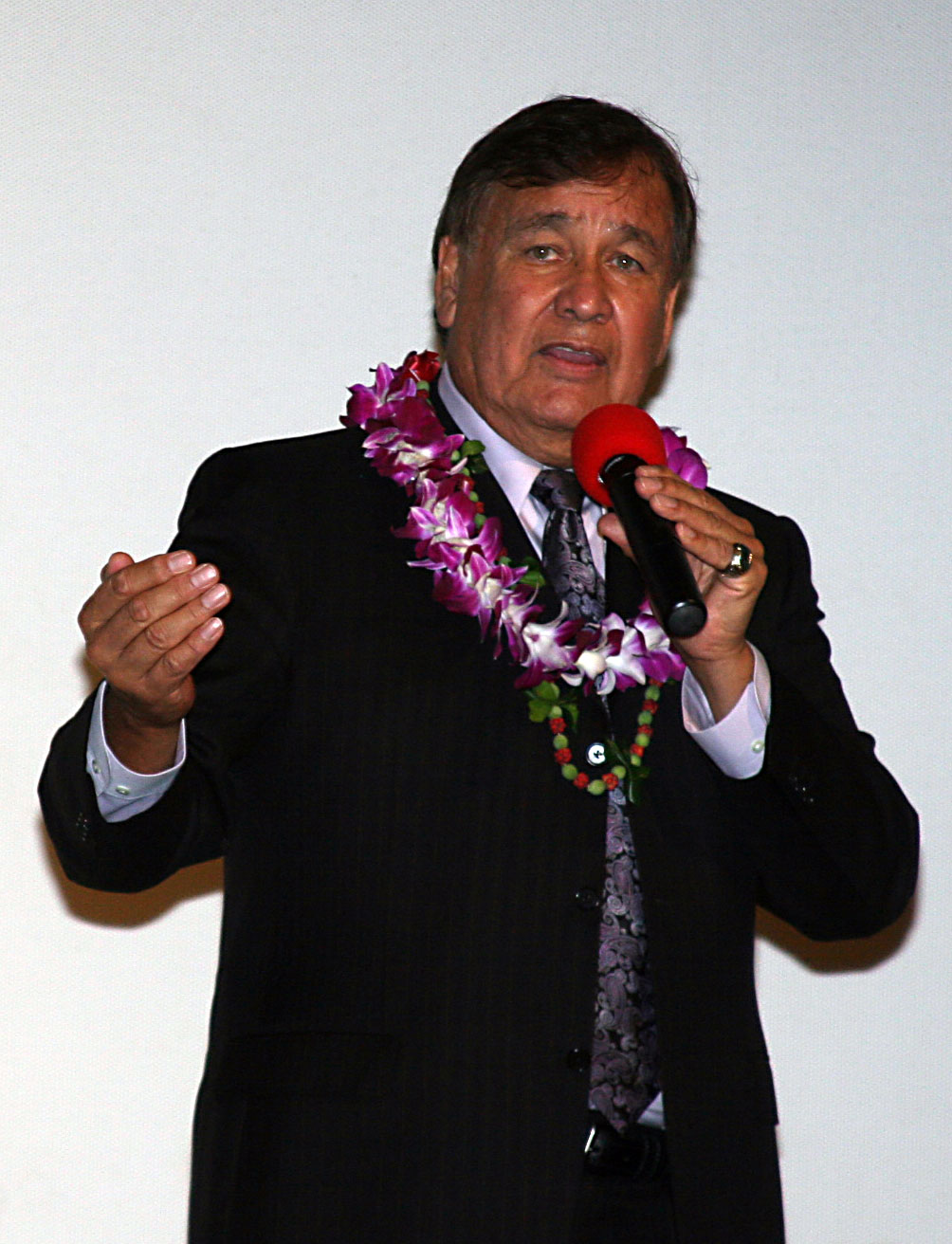
Mills speaking at Schofield Barracks in November 2010

Mills later set U.S. records for 10,000 m (28:17.6) and the three-mile run, and had a 5,000 m best of 13:41.4. In 1965, he and Gerry Lindgren both broke the world record for the six-mile run when they finished in a tie at the AAU National Championships, running 27:11.6.

== Post-running career ==
Mills is the co-founder of the nonprofit Running Strong for American Indian Youth with Eugene Krizek. The aim of Running Strong is to help Native American people fulfill their basic needs – food, water, and shelter – while also helping their communities gain self-sufficiency and self-esteem. He now acts as a spokesperson for the organization and travels the country empowering Native youth and encouraging them to follow their dreams. Mills' charity work also includes diabetes prevention and management education for adults and especially for youth. Mills himself is Type 2 diabetic and helps people with diabetes learn how to maintain a healthy lifestyle and improve their lives.

Mills co-wrote a book with Nicholas Sparks, Wokini: A Lakota Journey to Happiness and Self-Understanding and wrote another, Lessons of a Lakota, made speaking tours, and sponsored some events. He lives near Sacramento, California.

== In film and television ==
Mills is the subject of the 1983 movie Running Brave, in which he is portrayed by Robby Benson. He is also one of several athletes featured on the August 18, 2016, On Being episode "Running as a Spiritual Practice".

== Legacy and honors ==
- In 1976, Mills was inducted into the United States National Track and Field Hall of Fame.
- In 1984, he was one of a select group of former American Olympians given the honor of carrying the Olympic flag into the Los Angeles Memorial Coliseum at the opening ceremony of the Games of the XXIII Olympiad.
- In 1984, he was inducted into the United States Olympic Hall of Fame.
- He has also been inducted into the National Distance Running Hall of Fame, the Kansas Hall of Fame, the South Dakota Hall of Fame, the San Diego Hall of Fame, and the National High School Hall of Fame.
- President Barack Obama awarded Mills the 2012 Presidential Citizens Medal, for his work with the Running Strong for American Indian Youth organization.
- In 2014, Mills was awarded the NCAA's highest honor, the Theodore Roosevelt Award.
- In 2014, the Virginia State Senate passed a joint resolution commending Mills on the 50th Anniversary of his Olympic win.
- The Anti-Defamation League honored Mills as a 2014 ADL In Concert Against Hate Honoree.
- In 2015, The President's Council on Fitness, Sports, and Nutrition awarded Mills the President's Council Lifetime Achievement Award, which is given each year to up to 5 individuals "whose careers have greatly contributed to the advancement or promotion of physical activity, fitness, sports, or nutrition nationwide."
- In 2017 accomplishments immortalized with a plaque in Sacramento's Walk of Stars. The star is set into the sidewalk on the south side of L Street between 18th and 19th streets in Sacramento, CA.
- On 26 February 2018, Lawrence Unified School District 497 voted to change the name of South Middle School to Billy Mills Middle School.
- In October 2018, Mills became one of the inductees in the first induction ceremony held by the National Native American Hall of Fame.

== Books ==
- 1990, Wokini: A Lakota Journey to Happiness and Self-Understanding, written with Nicholas Sparks.
- 2005, Lessons of a Lakota.

== See also ==
- Olympic medalists in athletics
- Jim Thorpe
