= Nguyễn Văn Lý (athlete) =

Vietnamese long-distance runner (born 1942)

Personal information
- Nationality: Vietnamese
- Born: 30 May 1942 (age 84)

Sport
- Sport: Long-distance running
- Event: Marathon

Nguyễn Văn Lý (born 30 May 1942) is a Vietnamese long-distance runner. He competed in the marathon at the 1964 Summer Olympics. He also won a bronze medal at the 1959 SEAP Games.
