= Brian Kilby =

British athlete (1938–2024)

Personal information
- Nationality: British (English)
- Born: 26 February 1938 Coventry, England
- Died: 30 June 2024 (aged 86)
- Height: 170 cm (5 ft 7 in)
- Weight: 57 kg (126 lb)

Sport
- Sport: Running
- Event: Men's marathon
- Club: Coventry Godiva Harriers
Medal record
Men's athletics
Representing Great Britain
European Athletics Championships
Gold medal – first place	1962 Belgrade	Marathon
Representing England
British Empire and Commonwealth Games
Gold medal – first place	1962 Perth	Marathon

Brian Leonard Kilby (26 February 1938 – 30 June 2024) was a marathon runner from Great Britain, who competed at two Olympic Games.

== Biography ==
Kilby became the British marathon champion after winning the British AAA Championships title at the 1960 AAA Championships. Kilby would go on to win every AAA marathion title from 1960 to 1964. At the 1960 Olympic Games in Rome, he represented Great Britain in the marathon, where he finished 29th in the men's marathon.

In 1962 when he won gold medal in the men's marathon at the European Championships and at the 1962 Commonwealth Games.

Running in Port Talbot, Wales, on 6 July 1963, he ran his best time, 2:14:43, setting a world record. He represented Great Britain a year later, at the 1964 Summer Olympics in Tokyo, Japan, where he finished fourth in the men's marathon in 2:17:02.4, just 43.2 seconds behind then-reigning world record holder Basil Heatley, who took second place.

He represented England and won a gold medal in the marathon at the 1962 British Empire and Commonwealth Games in Perth, Western Australia.

Four years later he represented England in the marathon again, at the 1966 British Empire and Commonwealth Games in Kingston, Jamaica.

Kilby died on 30 June 2024, at the age of 86.
