= Kōkichi Tsuburaya =

Japanese long-distance runner (1940–1968)

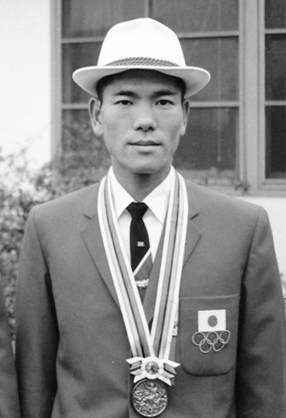
- Kōkichi Tsuburaya at the 1964 Olympics

Personal information
- Nationality: Japanese
- Born: May 13, 1940 Sukagawa, Fukushima, Japan
- Died: January 9, 1968 (aged 27) Nerima, Tokyo, Japan
- Height: 1.63 m (5 ft 4 in)
- Weight: 54 kg (119 lb)

Sport
- Sport: Long-distance running
- Events: 10,000 meters, marathon

Achievements and titles
- Personal bests: 10,000 meters: 28:52.6; Marathon: 2:16:23
Medal record
Representing Japan
Men's athletics
| Bronze medal – third place | 1964 Tokyo | Marathon |

Kōkichi Tsuburaya (円谷 幸吉, Tsuburaya Kōkichi) (born Kokichi Tsumuraya (円谷 幸吉, Tsumuraya Kōkichi); May 13, 1940 – January 9, 1968) was a Japanese athlete who competed mainly as a marathoner. Kokichi was also a 1st lieutenant in the Japan Ground Self-Defense Force.

== Running career ==
Tsuburaya competed at the 1964 Summer Olympics held in Tokyo, Japan, finishing sixth in the 10,000m event and lining up for the marathon as well, on the final day of competition. Abebe Bikila of Ethiopia won the race decisively, becoming the first man to defend his Olympic title in the event, having won in Rome in 1960, running barefoot. Tsuburaya entered the stadium second, but was overtaken on the final lap by the furious sprint of Britain's Basil Heatley and finished third, earning the bronze medal. Tsuburaya was mortified by the loss to Heatley, saying to fellow marathoner Kenji Kimihara, "I committed an inexcusable blunder in front of the Japanese people. I have to make amends by running and hoisting the Hinomaru in the next Olympics, in Mexico".

Shortly after the Tokyo Olympics, Tsuburaya suffered from an ongoing back problem, known as lumbago.

== Death ==
Tsuburaya killed himself on January 9, 1968. His body was found in the dormitory room where he was staying while training for the Mexico City Olympics. He was holding on to his bronze medal.
