= International Cross Country Championships =

International cross country running event between 1898–1972

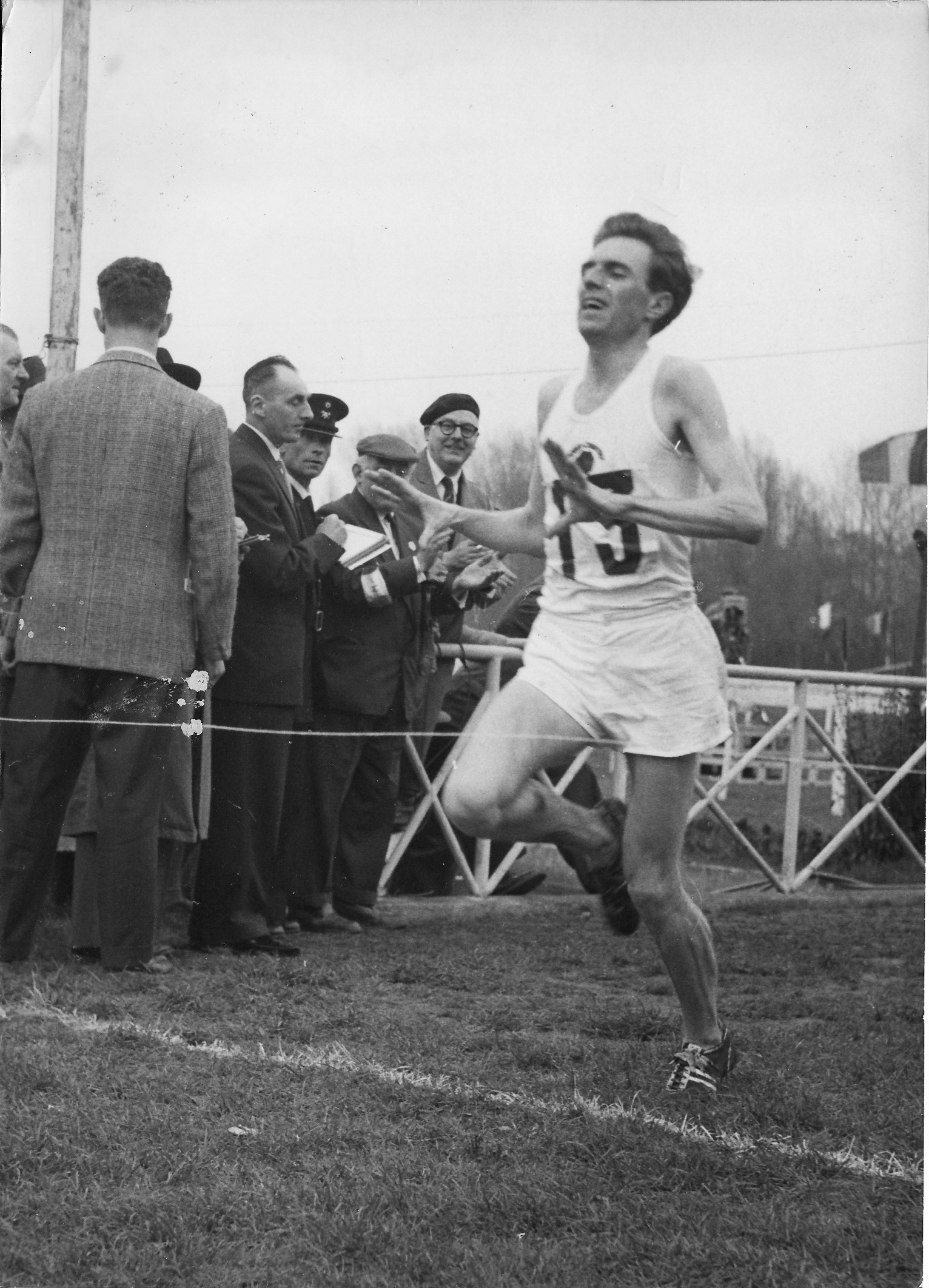
- Frank Sando crossing the line to win the 1957 edition of the championships
- Status: active
- Genre: sports event
- Date: March–April
- Frequency: annual
- Location: various
- Inaugurated: 1898
- Most recent: 1972
- Organiser: ICCU

The International Cross Country Championships was an annual international competition in cross- country running. It was created in 1903 by the International Cross Country Union (ICCU) and it marked the first time that an annual international championships had been held for the sport.

It began its life as a contest between the four Home Nations of the United Kingdom. The event became increasingly international over its history, beginning with the admittance of the first non-UK country in 1907 (France), the addition of several other Continental European countries in the 1920s, and then the introduction of Tunisia in 1958 which saw an African team compete for the first time.

The championships featured only a senior men's race from 1903 to 1961, at which point an under-21s event was introduced. After some years as an unsanctioned competition, a women's race finally gained official acceptance in 1967.

The event lasted from 1903 to 1972 – at the 1971 ICCU Congress members decided to transfer organisation of the event to the International Amateur Athletics Federation (IAAF), a move which was finalised after the 1972 ICC Championships and led to the first IAAF World Cross Country Championships in 1973.

The International Cross Country Championships featured a number of running greats, including: Alfred Shrubb (the inaugural race winner) and Jean Bouin in its early years, Frank Sando who won twice, as well as Jack Holden and Alain Mimoun who both won the race a record four times, and then Franjo Mihalić, Gaston Roelants and David Bedford in its later years. American runner Doris Brown was dominant in the short history of the women's race, winning all but two of the official women's races.

== Editions ==
Edition	Year	City	Country	Date	Venue	No. of Countries	No. of Athletes
Unofficial	1898	Paris-Ville-d'Avray	France	March 20		2	16
1st	1903	Hamilton, Lanarkshire	Scotland	March 23	Hamilton Park Racecourse	4	45
2nd	1904	St Helens, Lancashire	England	March 26	Haydock Park	4	46
3rd	1905	Dublin, Leinster	Ireland	March 25	Baldoyle Racecourse	4	48
4th	1906	Newport-Caerleon, Monmouthshire	Wales	March 10	Caerleon Racecourse	4	44
5th	1907	Glasgow	Scotland	March 23	Glasgow Agricultural Society Show Grounds, Scotstoun	5	56
6th	1908	Paris-Colombes	France	March 26	Stade de Matin	5	54
7th	1909	Derby, Derbyshire	England	March 20	Derby Racecourse	5	51
8th	1910	Belfast, Ulster	Ireland	March 26	Belvoir Park	5	43
9th	1911	Newport-Caerleon, Monmouthshire	Wales	March 25	Caerleon Racecourse	5	45
10th	1912	Edinburgh, Lothian	Scotland	March 30	Saughton Public Park	5	44
11th	1913	Paris-Juvisy-sur-Orge	France	March 24	Juvisy Aerodrome	4	36
12th	1914	Amersham, Buckinghamshire	England	March 28	Chesham Park	5	45
Not held due to World War I
13th	1920	Belfast, Ulster	Ireland	April 3	Belvoir Park	4	35
14th	1921	Newport-Caerleon	Wales	March 19	Caerleon Racecourse	4	36
15th	1922	Glasgow	Scotland	April 1	Hampden Park	5	45
16th	1923	Paris-Maisons-Laffitte	France	March 25	Hippodrome de Maisons-Laffitte	4	36
17th	1924	Newcastle-on-Tyne, Northumberland	England	March 22	Gosforth Park	6	52
18th	1925	Dublin	Ireland	March 28	Baldoyle Racecourse	5	42
19th	1926	Brussels	Belgium	March 28	Hippodrome de Stockel	6	53
20th	1927	Newport-Caerleon, Monmouthshire	Wales	April 2	Caerleon Racecourse	5	44
21st	1928	Ayr, Ayrshire	Scotland	March 24		5	45
22nd	1929	Paris-Vincennes	France	March 23	Hippodrome de Vincennes	10	90
23rd	1930	Leamington, Warwickshire	England	March 22		7	61
24th	1931	Dublin (men)	Ireland	March 28	Baldoyle Racecourse	6	54
24th	1931	Douai, Nord-Pas-de-Calais (women)	France	March 22		3	16
25th	1932	Brussels (men)	Belgium	March 20	Hippodrome de Stockel	6	52
25th	1932	Croydon, Surrey (women)	England	March 19		2	12
26th	1933	Newport-Caerleon, Monmouthshire	Wales	March 25	Caerleon Racecourse	6	54
27th	1934	Ayr, Ayrshire	Scotland	March 24	Ayr Racecourse	6	54
28th	1935	Paris-Auteuil (men)	France	March 23	Hippodrome d'Auteuil	7	61
28th	1935	Morecambe, Lancashire (women)	England	March 20	The Old Golf Links	2	11
29th	1936	Blackpool, Lancashire	England	March 28	The Stadium, Squires Gate	6	54
30th	1937	Brussels	Belgium	March 20	Hippodrome de Stockel	6	54
31st	1938	Belfast, Ulster (men)	Northern Ireland	April 2	Royal Ulster Showground	7	63
31st	1938	Lille, Nord-Pas-de-Calais (women)	France	April 2		3	18
32nd	1939	Cardiff, Glamorgan	Wales	April 1	Ely Racecourse	7	63
Unofficial	1940	Paris	France	March 24	Bois de Boulogne	3	27
Not held due to World War II
33rd	1946	Ayr, Ayrshire	Scotland	March 30		6	54
34th	1947	Paris-Saint-Cloud	France	March 30	Hippodrome de Saint-Cloud	6	54
35th	1948	Reading, Berkshire	England	April 3	Leighton Park	6	54
36th	1949	Dublin	Ireland	March 26	Baldoyle Racecourse	7	62
37th	1950	Brussels	Belgium	March 25	Boitsfort Hippodrome	10	88
38th	1951	Newport-Caerleon, Monmouthshire	Wales	March 31	Caerleon Racecourse	8	71
39th	1952	Hamilton, Lanarkshire	Scotland	March 22	Hamilton Park Racecourse	7	63
40th	1953	Paris-Vincennes	France	March 21	Hippodrome de Vincennes	10	89
41st	1954	Birmingham	England	March 27 (men)	Bromford Bridge Racecourse	7	62
41st	1954	Birmingham	England	March 20 (women)		2	12
42nd	1955	San Sebastián, Euskadi (men)	Spain	March 19	Lasarte Hippodrome	8	70
42nd	1955	Ayr, Ayrshire (women)	Scotland	March 26		2	12
43rd	1956	Belfast (men)	Northern Ireland	March 17	Royal Ulster Showground	8	70
43rd	1956	Upminster, Essex (women)	England	March 17		2	12
44th	1957	Waregem, West Flanders (men)	Belgium	March 23	Hippodroom Waregem	10	89
44th	1957	Musselburgh, East Lothian (women)	Scotland	March 30		2	12
45th	1958	Cardiff, Glamorgan	Wales	March 22	Pontcanna Fields	9	78
46th	1959	Lisbon	Portugal	March 21	National Stadium	9	78
47th	1960	Hamilton, Lanarkshire	Scotland	March 26	Hamilton Park Racecourse	8	71
48th	1961	Nantes, Pays de la Loire	France	March 26		10	109
49th	1962	Sheffield, Yorkshire	England	March 24	Graves Park	10	126
50th	1963	San Sebastián, Euskadi	Spain	March 17	Lasarte Hippodrome	11	125
51st	1964	Dublin	Ireland	March 21	Leopardstown Racecourse	9	113
52nd	1965	Ostend, West Flanders	Belgium	March 20	Hippodrome Wellington	15	174
53rd	1966	Rabat	Morocco	March 20	Souissi Racecourse	15	134
54th	1967	Barry, Glamorgan	Wales	March 18		12	152
55th	1968	Tunis (men)	Tunisia	March 17	Hippodrome de Kassar-Said (men)	14	177
55th	1968	Blackburn, Lancashire (women)	England	March 23		5	30
56th	1969	Clydebank, Dunbartonshire	Scotland	March 22	Dalmuir Park	14	193
57th	1970	Vichy, Auvergne	France	March 22		17	211
57th	1970	Frederick, Maryland (alternate women's event)	United States	March 21	VFW Country Club	17	211
58th	1971	San Sebastián, Euskadi	Spain	March 20	Lasarte Hippodrome	18	228
59th	1972	Cambridge, Cambridgeshire	England	March 18	Coldham's Common	15	200

== Results ==
=== Men's individual results ===
Year	(gold) First		(silver) Second		(bronze) Third	
1898 (unofficial); 9 mi (14.5 km)	Sid Robinson; England	56:36	Harry Harrison; England	56:36.4	Charles Bennett; England	57:14.8
1903; 8.5 mi (13.7 km)	Alfred Shrubb; England	46:22.6	Tom Edwards; England	46:56.6	John Daly; Ireland	47:10.2
1904; 8.5 mi (13.7 km)	Alfred Shrubb; England	47:58.4	Albert Aldridge; England	48:20.2	George Pearce; England	49:38.6
1905; 8 mi (12.9 km)	Albert Aldridge; England	40:20	Tom Hynes; Ireland	40:35	Joe Deakin; England	41:14
1906; 10 mi (16.1 km)	Charles Straw; England	57:32	George Pearce; England	57:55	Will Nelson; England	58:11
1907; 10 mi (16.1 km)	Adam Underwood; England	54:26.4	George Pearce; England	54:48	Sammy Welding; England	54:50
1908; 10 mi (16.1 km)	Arthur Robertson; England	50:26.8	Fred Neaves; England	50:31	George Pearce; England	50:42
1909; 10 mi (16.1 km)	Arthur Edwin Wood; England	58:03	Jean Bouin; France	58:04	Ernest Loney; England	58:53
1910; 10 mi (16.1 km)	Arthur Edwin Wood; England	54:02	Puck O'Neill; Ireland	54:24	Harry Baldwin; England	54:24
1911; 10 mi (16.1 km)	Jean Bouin; France	54:07.6	Harry Baldwin; England	54:22	George Wallach; Scotland	54:44
1912; 10 mi (16.1 km)	Jean Bouin; France	51:46	William Scott; England	52:19	Frederick Hibbins; England	52:34
1913; 10 mi (16.1 km)	Jean Bouin; France	51:52.4	Ernest Glover; England	52:33	Jacques Keyser; France	53:10
1914; 10 mi (16.1 km)	Alfred Nichols; England	1:00:24	George Wallach; Scotland	1:00:41	Ernest Glover; England	1:00:46
Not held due to World War I
1920; 10 mi (16.1 km)	Jim Wilson; Scotland	55:06	Christopher Vose; England	55:33	Wally Freeman; England	55:52
1921; 10 mi (16.1 km)	Wally Freeman; England	56:53	Bobby Mills; England	57:03	Bevy Bingham; Ireland	57:17
1922; 10 mi (16.1 km)	Joseph Guillemot; France	1:03:59	Bill Cotterell; England	1:04:27	Julien Schnellmann; France	1:05:03
1923; 10 mi (16.1 km)	Joe Blewitt; England	58:11.8	James G. McIntyre; Scotland	58:13	Georges van den Broele; Belgium	58:20
1924; 10 mi (16.1 km)	Bill Cotterell; England	55:35.4	Ernie Harper; England	55:40	Eddie Webster; England	56:21
1925; 10 mi (16.1 km)	Eddie Webster; England	56:55	John Ryan; Ireland	57:14	Bill Cotterell; England	57:38
1926; 9 mi (14.5 km)	Ernie Harper; England	44:17.4	Joseph Guillemot; France	44:59	Robert Marchal; France	45:04
1927; 9 mi (14.5 km)	Lewis Payne; England	51:40	Seghir Beddari; France	51:49	Henri Gallet; France	52:03
1928; 9.5 mi (15.3 km)	Harry Eckersley; England	52:34	John Suttie Smith; Scotland	52:48	Seghir Beddari; France	53:02
1929; 8.7 mi (14.0 km)	Bill Cotterell; England	42:46.2	Henri Dartigues; France	42:48	Robert Courtier; France	42:51
1930; 9.5 mi (15.3 km)	Tom Evenson; England	53:49	Robbie Sutherland; Scotland	53:50	Roméo Dieguez; France	54:15
1931; 9 mi (14.5 km)	Tim Smythe; Ireland	48:52	Jack Winfield; England	49:11	Tom Evenson; England	49:16
1932; 9 mi (14.5 km)	Tom Evenson; England	50:51	Jack Holden; England	51:06	Walter Beavers; England	51:15
1933; 9 mi (14.5 km)	Jack Holden; England	53:40.8	Robbie Sutherland; Scotland	53:50	John Suttie Smith; Scotland	53:54
1934; 9 mi (14.5 km)	Jack Holden; England	50:28	Alex Burns; England	51:24	Arthur Penny; England	51:26
1935; 9 mi (14.5 km)	Jack Holden; England	47:52	Bill Wylie; Scotland	48:12	William Eaton; England	48:14
1936; 9 mi (14.5 km)	William Eaton; England	47:38	Jack Holden; England	48:08	Alex Dow; Scotland	48:14
1937; 9 mi (14.5 km)	Jim Flockhart; Scotland	49:50	André Sicard; France	50:03	James Ginty; England	50:13
1938; 9 mi (14.5 km)	Jack Emery; England	49:57	Jean Chapelle; Belgium	50:16	Sam Palmer; Wales	50:36
1939; 9 mi (14.5 km)	Jack Holden; England	47:23	Mohamed El Ghazi; France	47:34	Salem Amrouche; France	47:52
Not held due to World War II
1946; 9 mi (14.5 km)	Raphaël Pujazon; France	51:51.2	Marcel Vandewattyne; Belgium	52:24	Paul Messner; France	52:49
1947; 9 mi (14.5 km)	Raphaël Pujazon; France	50:26	Jean Chapelle; Belgium	50:51	Mohamed Lahoucine; France	51:04
1948; 9 mi (14.5 km)	John Doms; Belgium	54:05	Emile Renson; Belgium	54:25	Mohamed Lahoucine; France	54:50
1949; 9 mi (14.5 km)	Alain Mimoun; France	47:50	Raphaël Pujazon; France	47:51	Charles Cérou; France	47:55
1950; 9 mi (14.5 km)	Lucien Theys; Belgium	45:42	Alain Mimoun; France	45:50	Mohamed Hamza; France	46:00
1951; 9.25 mi (14.9 km)	Geoff Saunders; England	54:07	Frank Aaron; England	54:48	Charles Cérou; France	55:05
1952; 9 mi (14.5 km)	Alain Mimoun; France	48:19	Marcel Vandewattyne; Belgium	49:02	Abdelkader Driss; France	49:06
1953; 9 mi (14.5 km)	Franjo Mihalić; Yugoslavia	47:53	Frank Sando; England	48:03	Abdallah Ould Lamine; France	48:06
1954; 9 mi (14.5 km)	Alain Mimoun; France	47:51	Ken Norris; England	48:13	Patrick Ranger; England	48:21
1955; 9 mi (14.5 km)	Frank Sando; England	46:09	Hugh Foord; England	46:33	Ken Norris; England	46:35
1956; 9 mi (14.5 km)	Alain Mimoun; France	45:18	Frank Sando; England; Ken Norris; England	45:28		
1957; 9 mi (14.5 km)	Frank Sando; England	45:58	Basil Heatley; England	46:09	Ken Norris; England	46:18
1958; 9 mi (14.5 km)	Stanley Eldon; England	46:29	Alain Mimoun; France	46:30	Frank Sando; England	46:33
1959; 9 mi (14.5 km)	Fred Norris; England	42:44.8	Frank Sando; England	42:52.4	Salah Beddiaf; France	43:01.4
1960; 9 mi (14.5 km)	Rhadi Ben Abdesselam; Morocco	43:33	Gaston Roelants; Belgium	43:40	John Merriman; Wales	43:40
1961; 8.9 mi (14.3 km)	Basil Heatley; England	45:22.2	Antonio Amoros; Spain	45:46	Martin Hyman; England	45:56.4
1962; 7.5 mi (12.0 km)	Gaston Roelants; Belgium	44:40	Marcel Vandewattyne; Belgium	44:46	Mel Batty; England	44:48
1963; 7.5 mi (12.1 km)	Roy Fowler; England	37:19.7	Gaston Roelants; Belgium	37:32	Mariano Haro; Spain	37:41.6
1964; 7.3 mi (11.8 km)	Francisco Aritmendi; Spain	40:33	Ron Hill; England	40:42	John Cooke; England	40:49
1965; 7.5 mi (12.1 km)	Jean Fayolle; France	36:48	Mel Batty; England	36:48	Mohamed Gammoudi; Tunisia	37:00
1966; 7.5 mi (12.1 km)	Ben Assou El Ghazi; Morocco	36:22.1	Derek Graham; Ireland	36:29.6	Tracy Smith; United States	36:32.2
1967; 7.5 mi (12.1 km)	Gaston Roelants; Belgium	36:03	Tim Johnston; England	36:20	Bryan Rose; New Zealand	36:27
1968; 7.5 mi (12.1 km)	Mohamed Gammoudi; Tunisia	35:25.4	Ron Hill; England	35:26.8	Roy Fowler; England	35:31.8
1969; 7.5 mi (12.0 km)	Gaston Roelants; Belgium	36:25	Dick Taylor; England	36:44	Ian McCafferty; Scotland	36:57
1970; 7.5 mi (12.1 km)	Mike Tagg; England	36:39.8	Gaston Roelants; Belgium	36:41.8	Trevor Wright; England	36:44.6
1971; 7.5 mi (12.1 km)	Dave Bedford; England	38:42.8	Trevor Wright; England	39:05.2	Eddie Gray; New Zealand	39:11.6
1972; 7.5 mi (12.1 km)	Gaston Roelants; Belgium	37:43	Mariano Haro; Spain	38:01	Ian Stewart; Scotland	38:20

=== Men's Team Results ===
Year	(gold) First		(silver) Second		(bronze) Third	
1898 (unofficial)	England	21	France	69		
1903	England	25	Ireland	78	Scotland	107
1904	England	27	Wales	102	Scotland	113
1905	England	28	Scotland	82	Ireland	97
1906	England	24	Ireland	86	Scotland	106
1907	England	23	Scotland	85	Ireland	123
1908	England	24	France	81	Ireland	104
1909	England	32	Ireland	77	Scotland	107
1910	England	35	Ireland	56	Scotland	102
1911	England	32	Ireland	108	Scotland	121
1912	England	41	Scotland	88	Ireland	110
1913	England	38	France	61	Scotland	96
1914	England	47	Scotland	74	France	106
Not held due to World War I
1920	England	38	Ireland	70	Scotland	114
1921	England	33	Ireland	71	Wales	119
1922	France	53	England	65	Scotland	90
1923	France	43	England	76	Belgium	112
1924	England	21	France	80	Scotland	133
1925	England	29	Ireland	91	Wales	92
1926	France	32	England	62	Scotland	101
1927	France	49	England	61	Scotland	112
1928	France	45	England	55	Scotland	104
1929	France	31	England	74	Spain	117
1930	England	30	France	80	Scotland	111
1931	England	32	Scotland	102	France	102
1932	England	21	France	69	Scotland	110
1933	England	32	Scotland	62	France	109
1934	England	34	France	102	Scotland	105
1935	England	30	Scotland	84	France	102
1936	England	41	France	66	Scotland	112
1937	England	55	France	70	Belgium	98
1938	England	43	France	96	Belgium	117
1939	France	36	England	95	Belgium	115
Not held due to World War II
1946	France	43	Belgium	77	England	96
1947	France	34	Belgium	86	England	105
1948	Belgium	46	France	47	England	114
1949	France	33	England	90	Ireland	123
1950	France	43	Belgium	77	England	82
1951	England	47	France	54	Belgium	99
1952	France	35	England	64	Belgium	126
1953	England	64	France	84	Yugoslavia	129
1954	England	29	France	85	Belgium	102
1955	England	27	Belgium	102	Spain	109
1956	France	42	England	59	Belgium	131
1957	Belgium	67	France	80	England	84
1958	England	35	France	64	Belgium	166
1959	England	40	France	72	Belgium	110
1960	England	52	Belgium	61	France	125
1961	Belgium	54	England	71	France	119
1962	England	44	Spain	115	Belgium	132
1963	Belgium	110	France	113	England	113
1964	England	38	France	96	Morocco	149
1965	England	55	France	55	New Zealand	110
1966	England	59	France	79	Morocco	184
1967	England	70	New Zealand	96	France	122
1968	England	58	France	101	Spain	129
1969	England	57	France	121	Belgium	125
1970	England	35	France	85	Belgium	136
1971	England	56	Belgium	176	France	186
1972	England	84	Morocco	94	Belgium	140

=== Junior Men's Individual Results ===
Year	(gold) First		(silver) Second		(bronze) Third	
1940 (unofficial); 5 mi (8.0 km)	Frank Aaron; England	27:51	Gaston Cottin; France	28:00	Jack Timmins; England	28:09
1961; 4.7 mi (7.5 km)	Colin Robinson; England	26:20.4	Alan Simpson; England	26:24.4	Mariano Haro; Spain	26:25.2
1962; 4.7 mi (7.5 km)	Abdeslem Bouchta; Morocco	25:05	Anthony Evans; England; Martin Heath; England	25:23		
1963; 4.7 mi (7.5 km)	John Farrington; England	25:17.4	Ahmed Zammel; Tunisia	25:23.6	Lachie Stewart; Scotland	25:37.6
1964; 4.7 mi (7.5 km)	Ian McCafferty; Scotland	24:20	David Walker; England	24:45	Don Collins; England	24:45
1965; 4.7 mi (7.5 km)	Johnny Dumon; Belgium	21:36	Albien van Holsbeek; Belgium	21:44	David Walker; England	21:51
1966; 4.35 mi (7.0 km)	Mike Tagg; England	21:26.4	Roy Young; England	21:35.3	Eddie Knox; Scotland	21:40.6
1967; 4.35 mi (7.0 km)	Eddie Knox; Scotland	24:42	Eddy van Butsele; Belgium	24:44	Brooks Mileson; England	24:49
1968; 4.35 mi (7.0 km)	John Bednarski; England	20:59	Pierre de Freyn; Belgium	21:00	Mohamed Omar; Morocco	21:02
1969; 4.35 mi (7.0 km)	Dave Bedford; England	19:38	John Bednarski; England	19:59	John Harrison; England	20:13
1970; 4.35 mi (7.0 km)	John Hartnett; Ireland	21:57.2	Jack Lane; England	22:05.2	Eric de Beck; Belgium	22:09.2
1971; 4.35 mi (7.0 km)	Nick Rose; England	23:12.4	Ray Smedley; England	23:17.4	Jim Brown; Scotland	24:02
1972; 4.35 mi (7.0 km)	Aldo Tomasini; Italy	23:20	Jim Brown; Scotland	23:35	Franco Fava; Italy	23:45

=== Junior Men's Team Results ===
Year	(gold) First		(silver) Second		(bronze) Third	
1940 (unofficial)	France	34	England	60	Belgium	102
1961	England	11	Belgium	18	Spain	39
1962	England	9	Morocco	28	Scotland	37
1963	England	12	Spain	20	Scotland	24
1964	England	16	Scotland	17	Morocco	22
1965	Belgium	9	England	14	Morocco	34
1966	England	8	Belgium	21	Scotland	28
1967	England	12	Belgium	30	Scotland	33
1968	England	10	Tunisia	27	Morocco	29
1969	England	6	Ireland	21	Spain	27
1970	England	15	Belgium	15	Italy	34
1971	England	7	Scotland	30	Italy	39
1972	Italy	19	England	22	Morocco	26

=== Women's Individual Results ===
Year	(gold) First		(silver) Second		(bronze) Third	
1931 (unofficial); 1.9 mi (3.0 km)	Gladys Lunn; England	11:12	Lilian Styles; England	11:25	Suzanne Lenoir; France	
1932 (unofficial); 1.9 mi (3.0 km)	Gladys Lunn; England	12:52	Suzanne Hedouin; France	13:06	Lilian Styles; England	13:07
1935 (unofficial); 1.9 mi (3.0 km)	Nellie Halstead; England	20:06	Lilian Styles; England	20:12	Esther Raven; England	20:18
1938 (unofficial); 1.9 mi (3.0 km)	Evelyne Forster; England	12:40	Dolly Harris-Roden; England	12:48	Jeanne Pousset; Belgium	12:51
1954 (unofficial); 2.5 mi (4.0 km)	Diane Leather; England	15:19	Anne Oliver; England	15:45	June Bridgland; England	16:12
1955 (unofficial); 1.9 mi (3.0 km)	Diane Leather; England	16:08	Anne Oliver; England	16:31	Leila Buckland; England	16:45
1956 (unofficial); 1.9 mi (3.0 km)	Roma Ashby; England	13:05	June Bridgland; England	13:11	Diane Leather; England	13:12
1957 (unofficial); 1.9 mi (3.0 km)	Diane Leather; England	11:15	Roma Ashby; England	11:21	June Bridgland; England	11:45
1967; 1.9 mi (3.0 km)	Doris Brown; United States	14:28	Rita Lincoln; England	15:05	Peggy Mullins; Ireland	15:07
1968; 2.8 mi (4.5 km)	Doris Brown; United States	15:00	Vicki Foltz; United States	15:12	Pamela Davies; England	15:21
1969; 2.5 mi (4.0 km)	Doris Brown; United States	14:46	Maureen Dickson; United States	14:51	Valerie Robinson; New Zealand	14:58
1970 (Vichy); 1.9 mi (3.0 km)	Paola Pigni; Italy	10:38.4	Zofia Kolakowska; Poland	10:39.2	Ilja Keizer; Netherlands	10:43.8
1970 (Frederick); 2.5 mi (4.0 km)	Doris Brown; United States	15:04	Rita Lincoln; England	15:11	Thelma Fynn; Canada	15:14
1971; 2.8 mi (4.5 km)	Doris Brown; United States	11:08.4	Berny Lenferink; Netherlands	11:21.2	Joyce Smith; England	11:23.2
1972; 2.8 mi (4.5 km)	Joyce Smith; England	16:11	Eileen Claugus; United States	16:13	Rita Ridley; England	16:19

=== Women's Team Results ===
Year	(gold) First		(silver) Second		(bronze) Third	
1931 (unofficial)	England	15	France	21	Belgium	42
1932 (unofficial)	England	14	France	22		
1935 (unofficial)	England	10	Scotland	26		
1938 (unofficial)	England	12	France	30	Belgium	36
1954 (unofficial)	England	10	Scotland	34		
1955 (unofficial)	England	10	Scotland	34		
1956 (unofficial)	England	10	Scotland	34		
1957 (unofficial)	England	10	Scotland	34		
1967	England	17	Ireland	35	Scotland	50
1968	United States	19	England	20	Scotland	55
1969	United States	23	New Zealand	35	England	37
1970 (Vichy)	Netherlands	19	France	39	Italy	45
1970 (Frederick)	England	18	United States	46	Ireland	48
1971	England	29	New Zealand	42	United States	51
1972	England	22	United States	40	Scotland	64
