= 1929 International Cross Country Championships =

- Organisers: ICCU
- Edition: 22nd
- Date: March 23
- Host city: Vincennes, Île-de-France, France
- Venue: Hippodrome de Vincennes
- Events: 1
- Distances: 8.7 mi (14.0 km)
- Participation: 90 athletes from 10 nations

The 1929 International Cross Country Championships was held in Vincennes, France, at the Hippodrome de Vincennes on March 23, 1929. This was the first appearance of teams from Italy, Luxembourg, Spain, and Switzerland. A report on the event was given in the Glasgow Herald.

Complete results, medalists, and the results of British athletes were published.

== Medalists ==
Event	Gold		Silver		Bronze	
Individual
Men; 8.7 mi (14.0 km)	Bill Cotterell; England	42:46.2	Henri Dartigues; France	42:48	Robert Courtier; France	42:51
Team
Men	France	31	England	74	Spain	117

== Individual Race Results ==
=== Men's (8.7 mi / 14.0 km) ===
Rank	Athlete	Nationality	Time
1st place, gold medalist(s)	Bill Cotterell	England	42:46.2
2nd place, silver medalist(s)	Henri Dartigues	France	42:48
3rd place, bronze medalist(s)	Robert Courtier	France	42:51
4	Robert Marchal	France	42:59
5	Jesús Oyarbide	Spain	43:04
6	Georges Boue	France	43:07
7	René Granier	France	43:12
8	Jack Winfield	England	43:24
9	Georges Leclerc	France	43:28
10	Seghir Beddari	France	43:29
11	Tommy Kay	England	43:32
12	Giuseppe Lippi	Italy	
13	Maurice Maréchal	Belgium	43:37
14	Arturo Peña	Spain	43:38
15	Roger Prévost	France	43:42
16	John Suttie Smith	Scotland	43:58
17	Ernie Harper	England	44:02
18	Jack Holden	England	44:03
19	Harry Payne	England	44:17
20	José Reliegos	Spain	44:23
21	Frank Stevenson	Scotland	44:25
22	Roger Rérolle	France	44:27
23	German Campo	Spain	44:28
24	Leon Degrande	Belgium	44:29
25	Frederick Light	England	44:32
26	Jimmy Wood	Scotland	44:36
27	Claudio Egana	Spain	44:41
28	Miguel Moreno	Spain	44:46
29	Brian Oddie	England	44:49
30	Charles Wilson	Scotland	44:51
31	Julien Schnellmann	Switzerland	
32	Marius Schiavo	Switzerland	
33	René Geeraert	Belgium	44:55
34	Leonard Broers	Belgium	44:56
35	Aurelio Badiali	Italy	
36	Jan Linsen	Belgium	45:02
37	Ernie Thomas	Wales	45:04
38	Miguel Cialceta	Spain	45:17
39	Tom Fanning	Ireland	45:19
40	Oscar Van Rumst	Belgium	45:20
41	Giovanni Amerio	Italy	
42	Giuseppe Venturi	Italy	
43	David Richards Sen.	Wales	45:28
44	Tim Smythe	Ireland	45:29
45	Carry Conlon	Ireland	45:29
46	Dunky Wright	Scotland	45:30
47	Luigi Prato	Italy	
48	W.A. McCune	Ireland	45:31
49	William Marthe	Switzerland	
50	Tom Whitton	Scotland	45:34
51	Hans Wehrli	Switzerland	
52	P. McCully	Ireland	45:44
53	John Timmins	Ireland	45:48
54	Angel Andres	Spain	45:53
55	Giacinto Falchero	Italy	
56	Julien Serwy	Belgium	45:58
57	Marcel Vernez	Switzerland	
58	Oreste Ciacci	Italy	
59	E.R. Leyshon	Wales	46:11
60	Jean Haag	Luxembourg	
61	Frank Denmead	Wales	46:16
62	Thomas Kinsella	Ireland	46:18
63	Emile Goetleven	Belgium	46:31
64	Gino Scarpellini	Italy	
65	Antonio Albano	Italy	
66	S. Driscoll	Wales	46:53
67	Ossie Williams	Wales	47:01
68	Ernest Violi	Switzerland	
69	A. Harvey	Wales	47:12
70	Arthur Muggridge	England	47:15
71	Michel Medinger	Luxembourg	
72	Josef Amrein	Switzerland	
73	C. Olinger	Luxembourg	
74	Pierre Scholtes	Luxembourg	
75	Theo Backes	Luxembourg	
76	Henri Dubois	Switzerland	
77	William J Gunn	Scotland	48:27
78	James Gardiner	Scotland	48:32
79	Pierre Beicht	Luxembourg	
80	Danny Phillips	Wales	48:40
81	Joseph Backes	Luxembourg	
82	Georges Boultgen	Luxembourg	
83	Jack Prosser	Wales	
84	Matthias Graffé	Luxembourg	
—	Juan Ramos	Spain	DNF
—	Harry Russell	Ireland	DNF
—	Robert Allison	Scotland	DNF
—	Jozef van Durme	Belgium	DNF
—	Martin Sheenan	Ireland	DNF
—	Bartolomeus Pieroni	Switzerland	DNF

== Team Results ==
=== Men's ===
Rank	Country	Team	Points
1	France	Henri Dartigues; Robert Courtier; Robert Marchal; Georges Boue; René Granier; Georges Leclerc	31
2	England	Bill Cotterell; Jack Winfield; Tommy Kay; Ernie Harper; Jack Holden; Harry Payne	74
3	Spain	Jesús Oyarbide; Arturo Peña; José Reliegos; German Campo; Claudio Egana; Miguel Moreno	117
4	Belgium	Maurice Maréchal; Leon Degrande; René Geeraert; Leonard Broers; Jan Linsen; Oscar Van Rumst	180
5	Scotland	John Suttie Smith; Frank Stevenson; Jimmy Wood; Charles Wilson; Dunky Wright; Tom Whitton	189
6	Italy	Giuseppe Lippi; Aurelio Badiali; Giovanni Amerio; Giuseppe Venturi; Luigi Prato; Giacinto Falchero	232
7	Ireland	Tom Fanning; Tim Smythe; Carry Conlon; W.A. McCune; P. McCully; John Timmins	281
8	Switzerland	Julien Schnellmann; Marius Schiavo; William Marthe; Hans Wehrli; Marcel Vernez; Ernest Violi	288
9	Wales	Ernie Thomas; David Richards Sen. E.R. Leyshon; Frank Denmead; S. Driscoll; Ossie Williams	333
10	Luxembourg	Jean Haag; Michel Medinger; C. Olinger; Pierre Scholtes; Theo Backes; Pierre Beicht	432

== Participation ==
An unofficial count yields the participation of 90 athletes from 10 countries.

- Belgium (9)
- England (9)
- France (9)
- Ireland (9)
- Italy (9)
- Luxembourg (9)
- Scotland (9)
- Spain (9)
- Switzerland (9)
- Wales (9)
