= 1934 International Cross Country Championships =

- Organisers: ICCU
- Edition: 27th
- Date: 24 March
- Host city: Ayr, Ayrshire, Scotland
- Venue: Ayr Racecourse
- Events: 1
- Distances: 9 mi (14.5 km)
- Participation: 54 athletes from 6 nations

The 1934 International Cross Country Championships was held in Ayr, Scotland, at the Ayr Racecourse on 24 March 1934. A report on the event was given in the Glasgow Herald.

Complete results, medalists, and the results of British athletes were published.

== Medalists ==
| Event | Gold | | Silver | | Bronze | |
|---|---|---|---|---|---|---|
Individual
| Men; 9 mi (14.5 km) | Jack Holden; England | 50:28 | Alec Burns; England | 51:24 | Arthur Penny; England | 51:26 |
Team
| Men | England | 34 | France | 102 | Scotland | 105 |

== Individual Race Results ==
=== Men's (9 mi / 14.5 km) ===
| Rank | Athlete | Nationality | Time |
|---|---|---|---|
| 1st place, gold medalist(s) | Jack Holden | England | 50:28 |
| 2nd place, silver medalist(s) | Alec Burns | England | 51:24 |
| 3rd place, bronze medalist(s) | Arthur Penny | England | 51:26 |
| 4 | Bert Footer | England | 51:35 |
| 5 | Fernand Le Heurteur | France | 51:37 |
| 6 | Jim Flockhart | Scotland | 51:44 |
| 7 | Mohamed Bou Maiza | France | 51:47 |
| 8 | Roger Rérolle | France | 52:08 |
| 9 | Victor Honorez | Belgium | 52:12 |
| 10 | Tom Evenson | England | 52:14 |
| 11 | Robbie Sutherland | Scotland | 52:16 |
| 12 | Alex Dow | Scotland | 52:17 |
| 13 | Harry Gallivan | Wales | 52:20 |
| 14 | Laurie Weatherill | England | 52:25 |
| 15 | Norman Jones | England | 52:30 |
| 16 | Pierre Bajart | Belgium | 52:34 |
| 17 | Georges Depotter | Belgium | 52:40 |
| 18 | Louis Willemyns | Belgium | 52:51 |
| 19 | Alex Workman | Northern Ireland | 52:55 |
| 20 | Ivor Brown | Wales | 52:57 |
| 21 | Frans Vandersteen | Belgium | 53:07 |
| 22 | Paul Lallement | France | 53:10 |
| 23 | John Suttie Smith | Scotland | 53:12 |
| 24 | D.F. Jones | Wales | 53:16 |
| 25 | Danny Phillips | Wales | 53:20 |
| 26 | Walter Hinde | Scotland | 53:22 |
| 27 | Jackie Laidlaw | Scotland | 53:24 |
| 28 | Robert Arnold | France | 53:39 |
| 29 | Gustaaf Maes | Belgium | 53:41 |
| 30 | Sammy Tombe | Scotland | 53:48 |
| 31 | Oscar van Rumst | Belgium | 53:52 |
| 32 | Roger Vigneron | France | 53:54 |
| 33 | W.A. McCune | Northern Ireland | 54:00 |
| 34 | Roger Rochard | France | 54:05 |
| 35 | William Eaton | England | 54:10 |
| 36 | René van Broeck | Belgium | 54:12 |
| 37 | René Vincent | Belgium | 54:24 |
| 38 | Sam Dodd | England | 54:26 |
| 39 | René Lécuron | France | 54:29 |
| 40 | Jimmy Nelson | Northern Ireland | 54:30 |
| 41 | Len Tongue | Wales | 54:48 |
| 42 | Bill Matthews | Wales | 54:56 |
| 43 | M. Gorman | Northern Ireland | 55:05 |
| 44 | Pat Blair | Northern Ireland | 55:12 |
| 45 | James Wilson | Scotland | 55:36 |
| 46 | Ernie Thomas | Wales | 55:57 |
| 47 | Tom Richards | Wales | 55:58 |
| 48 | Tom Todd | Scotland | 56:19 |
| 49 | Bob Patterson | Northern Ireland | 56:53 |
| 50 | Johnny Glenholmes | Northern Ireland | 57:18 |
| 51 | Victor Hamilton | Northern Ireland | 57:53 |
| 52 | Louis Leroy | France | 58:45 |
| 53 | E.L. Adams | Wales | 58:59 |
| 54 | Clarence Cheyney | Northern Ireland | 59:25 |

== Team Results ==
=== Men's ===
| Rank | Country | Team | Points |
|---|---|---|---|
| 1 | England | Jack Holden; Alec Burns; Arthur Penny; Bert Footer; Tom Evenson; Laurie Weatherill | 34 |
| 2 | France | Fernand Le Heurteur; Mohamed Bou Maiza; Roger Rérolle; Paul Lallement; Robert Arnold; Roger Vigneron | 102 |
| 3 | Scotland | Jim Flockhart; Robbie Sutherland; Alex Dow; John Suttie Smith; Walter Hinde; Jackie Laidlaw | 105 |
| 4 | Belgium | Victor Honorez; Pierre Bajart; Georges Depotter; Louis Willemyns; Frans Vandersteen; Gustaaf Maes | 110 |
| 5 | Wales | Harry Gallivan; Ivor Brown; D.F. Jones; Danny Phillips; Len Tongue; Bill Matthews | 165 |
| 6 | Northern Ireland | Alex Workman; W.A. McCune; Jimmy Nelson; M. Gorman; Pat Blair; Bob Patterson | 228 |

== Participation ==
An unofficial count yields the participation of 54 athletes from 6 countries.

- Belgium (9)
- England (9)
- France (9)
- Northern Ireland (9)
- Scotland (9)
- Wales (9)
