= 1933 International Cross Country Championships =

- Organisers: ICCU
- Edition: 26th
- Date: 25 March
- Host city: Caerleon, Monmouthshire, Wales
- Venue: Caerleon Racecourse
- Events: 1
- Distances: 19 mi (4.5 km)
- Participation: 54 athletes from 6 nations

The 1933 International Cross Country Championships was held in Caerleon, Wales, at the Caerleon Racecourse on 25 March 1933. A report on the event was given in the Glasgow Herald.

Complete results, medalists, and the results of British athletes were published.

== Medalists ==
Event	Gold		Silver		Bronze	
Individual
Men; 9 mi (14.5 km)	Jack Holden; England	53:40.8	Robbie Sutherland; Scotland	53:50	John Suttie Smith; Scotland	53:54
Team
Men	England	32	Scotland	62	France	109

== Individual Race Results ==
=== Men's (9 mi / 14.5 km) ===
Rank	Athlete	Nationality	Time
1st place, gold medalist(s)	Jack Holden	England	53:40.8
2nd place, silver medalist(s)	Robbie Sutherland	Scotland	53:50
3rd place, bronze medalist(s)	John Suttie Smith	Scotland	53:54
4	Bert Footer	England	53:58
5	George Bailey	England	54:30
6	Tom Evenson	England	54:34
7	William Eaton	England	54:36
8	René Lécuron	France	54:44
9	Arthur Penny	England	54:47
10	Victor Honorez	Belgium	54:49
11	Harry McIntosh	Scotland	54:51
12	Jim Flockhart	Scotland	54:53
13	Harry Gallivan	Wales	54:54
14	Wally Clift	England	54:56
15	Fernand Le Heurteur	France	54:59
16	William Slidders	Scotland	55:06
17	Paul Lallement	France	55:25
18	Sammy Tombe	Scotland	55:29
19	Moussa Bourachedi	France	55:40
20	Robert Arnold	France	55:45
21	Cyril Ellis	England	55:47
22	Ernie Thomas	Wales	55:56
23	James Wilson	Scotland	56:09
24	Johnny Glenholmes	Northern Ireland	56:26
25	Ivor Brown	Wales	56:32
26	Leon Verheylesonne	Belgium	56:36
27	A.S. Stone	Wales	56:36
28	George Depotter	Belgium	56:37
29	Walter Hinde	Scotland	56:43
30	Henri Lahitte	France	56:50
31	Oscar van Rumst	Belgium	56:59
32	Eugène Vérité	France	57:03
33	Antoine de Pauw	Belgium	57:24
34	Danny Phillips	Wales	57:32
35	Sam Dodd	England	57:37
36	Ted Hopkins	Wales	57:39
37	Alex Workman	Northern Ireland	57:40
38	Roger Rérolle	France	58:06
39	René van Broeck	Belgium	58:08
40	Harold Tongue	Wales	58:26
41	Sam Palmer	Wales	58:39
42	Edouard Schroeven	Belgium	59:03
43	M. Gorman	Northern Ireland	59:57
44	James Girvan	Scotland	1:00:07
45	Jean Linsen	Belgium	1:00:24
46	Victor Hamilton	Northern Ireland	1:01:39
47	Addie Cromie	Northern Ireland	1:02:10
48	Len Tongue	Wales	1:02:17
49	Hans Noble	Northern Ireland	1:04:33
50	J. Logan	Northern Ireland	1:06:00
—	René Geeraert	Belgium	DNF
—	Robert Loiseau	France	DNF
—	James Montgomery	Northern Ireland	DNF
—	H. Cuthcart	Northern Ireland	DNF

== Team Results ==
=== Men's ===
Rank	Country	Team	Points
1	England	Jack Holden; Bert Footer; George Bailey; Tom Evenson; William Eaton; Arthur Penny	32
2	Scotland	Robbie Sutherland; John Suttie Smith; Harry McIntosh; Jim Flockhart; William Slidders; Sammy Tombe	62
3	France	René Lécuron; Fernand Le Heurteur; Paul Lallement; Moussa Bourachedi; Robert Arnold; Henri Lahitte	109
4	Wales	Harry Gallivan; Ernie Thomas; Ivor Brown; A.S. Stone; Danny Phillips; Ted Hopkins	157
5	Belgium	Victor Honorez; Leon Verheylesonne; George Depotter; Oscar van Rumst; Antoine de Pauw; René van Broeck	167
6	Northern Ireland	Johnny Glenholmes; Alex Workman; M. Gorman; Victor Hamilton; Addie Cromie; Hans Noble	246

== Participation ==
An unofficial count yields the participation of 54 athletes from 6 countries.

- Belgium (9)
- England (9)
- France (9)
- Northern Ireland (9)
- Scotland (9)
- Wales (9)
