= 1928 International Cross Country Championships =

- Organisers: ICCU
- Edition: 21st
- Date: 24 March
- Host city: Ayr, Ayrshire, Scotland
- Events: 1
- Distances: 9.5 mi (15.3 km)
- Participation: 45 athletes from 5 nations

The 1928 International Cross Country Championships was held in Ayr, Scotland, on 24 March 1928.

Complete results, medalists, and the results of British athletes were published.

== Medalists ==
Event	Gold		Silver		Bronze	
Individual
Men; 9.5 mi (15.3 km)	Harry Eckersley; England	52:34	John Suttie Smith; Scotland	52:48	Seghir Beddari; France	53:02
Team
Men	France	45	England	55	Scotland	104

== Individual Race Results ==
=== Men's (9.5 mi / 15.3 km) ===
Rank	Athlete	Nationality	Time
1st place, gold medalist(s)	Harry Eckersley	England	52:34
2nd place, silver medalist(s)	John Suttie Smith	Scotland	52:48
3rd place, bronze medalist(s)	Seghir Beddari	France	53:02
4	Georges Boue	France	53:10
5	Harry Payne	England	53:34
6	Walter Beavers	England	53:35
7	Ernie Harper	England	53:45
8	Emile Chapuis	France	53:49
9	Henri Dartigues	France	54:00
10	Marcel Denis	France	54:02
11	René Granier	France	54:05
12	David Richards Sen.	Wales	54:10
13	Arthur Muggridge	England	54:11
14	Frank Stevenson	Scotland	54:33
15	Henri Lahitte	France	54:40
16	Georges Leclerc	France	54:43
17	Ernie Thomas	Wales	54:47
18	Robbie Sutherland	Scotland	54:54
19	Pat Coyle	Ireland	54:56
20	Dunky Wright	Scotland	55:06
21	Jimmy Wood	Scotland	55:22
22	Danny Phillips	Wales	55:26
23	Albert Worrall	England	55:38
24	Frank Denmead	Wales	55:49
25	Tom Fanning	Ireland	56:07
26	Victor Harman	England	56:25
27	E.R. Leyshon	Wales	56:27
28	Jack Prosser	Wales	56:30
29	William J Gunn	Scotland	56:41
30	George Magan	Ireland	56:46
31	Robert Henderson	Scotland	56:49
32	Ted Hopkins	Wales	57:25
33	J. Davies	Wales	57:27
34	Harry Russell	Ireland	57:31
35	John Nalty	Ireland	57:32
36	A. Morris	Ireland	57:33
37	Walter Calderwood	Scotland	57:37
38	John Timmins	Ireland	57:45
39	Sammy Tombe	Scotland	58:10
40	W. Smyth	Ireland	58:29
41	S. Driscoll	Wales	58:37
42	P. Dooley	Ireland	1:02:15
—	Eddie Webster	England	DNF
—	Joseph Robin	France	DNF
—	Tommy Metcalf	England	DNF

== Team Results ==
=== Men's ===
Rank	Country	Team	Points
1	France	Seghir Beddari; Georges Boue; Emile Chapuis; Henri Dartigues; Marcel Denis; René Granier	45
2	England	Harry Eckersley; Harry Payne; Walter Beavers; Ernie Harper; Arthur Muggridge; Albert Worrall	55
3	Scotland	John Suttie Smith; Frank Stevenson; Robbie Sutherland; Dunky Wright; Jimmy Wood; Walter Gunn	104
4	Wales	David Richards Sen. Ernie Thomas; Danny Phillips; Frank Denmead; E.R. Leyshon; Jack Prosser	130
5	Ireland	Pat Coyle; Tom Fanning; George Magan; Harry Russell; John Nalty; A. Morris	179

== Participation ==
An unofficial count yields the participation of 45 athletes from 5 countries.

- England (9)
- France (9)
- Ireland (9)
- Scotland (9)
- Wales (9)
