= 1931 International Cross Country Championships =

- Organisers: ICCU
- Edition: 24th
- Date: 28 March (men); 22 March (women)
- Host city: Dublin, Ireland (Republic of Ireland) (men); Douai, Nord-Pas-de-Calais, France (women)
- Venue: Baldoyle Racecourse (men)
- Events: 2
- Distances: 9 mi (14.5 km) men 1.9 mi (3.0 km) women
- Participation: 54 (men / 16 (women) athletes from 6 (men) / 3 (women) nations

The 1931 International Cross Country Championships was held in Dublin, Ireland, at the Baldoyle Racecourse on 28 March 1931. For the first time, an unofficial women's championship was held a week earlier in Douai, France on 22 March 1931. A report on the event was given in the Glasgow Herald for the men's and the women's event.

Complete results for men, and for women (unofficial), medalists, and the results of British athletes were published.

== Medalists ==
Event	Gold		Silver		Bronze	
Individual
Men; 9 mi (14.5 km)	Tim Smythe; Ireland	48:52	Jack Winfield; England	49:11	Tom Evenson; England	49:16
Women (unofficial); 1.9 mi (3.0 km)	Gladys Lunn; England	11:12	Lilian Styles; England	11:25	Suzanne Lenoir; France	
Team
Men	England	32	Scotland; France	102		
Women (unofficial)	England	15	France	21	Belgium	42

== Individual Race Results ==
=== Men's (9 mi / 14.5 km) ===
Rank	Athlete	Nationality	Time
1st place, gold medalist(s)	Tim Smythe	Ireland	48:52
2nd place, silver medalist(s)	Jack Winfield	England	49:11
3rd place, bronze medalist(s)	Tom Evenson	England	49:16
4	Henri Lahitte	France	49:31
5	Jack Potts	England	49:39
6	Jack Holden	England	49:43
7	Frank Deakin	England	50:00
8	Robbie Sutherland	Scotland	50:03
9	Arthur Allum	England	50:22
10	John Suttie Smith	Scotland	50:23
11	Robert Loiseau	France	50:25
12	Thomas Kinsella	Ireland	50:39
13	Jimmy Wood	Scotland	50:51
14	Marcel Michot	France	50:53
15	Albert Auvray	France	50:55
16	Victor Harman	England	50:57
17	Harry Gallivan	Wales	50:58
18	Danny Phillips	Wales	50:59
19	F. Mills	Ireland	51:07
20	J.C. McIntyre	Ireland	51:10
21	William J Gunn	Scotland	51:16
22	David Fry	Scotland	51:17
23	Ernie Harper	England	51:23
24	J. Behan	Ireland	51:25
25	Pierre Louchard	France	51:26
26	Oscar van Rumst	Belgium	51:29
27	Theo Meersman	Belgium	51:32
28	Charles Wilson	Scotland	51:33
29	Laurie Weatherill	England	51:37
30	Julien Serwy	Belgium	51:38
31	James Petrie	Scotland	51:44
32	Ernie Thomas	Wales	51:48
33	Sauveur Tapias	France	51:54
34	Maxi Stobbs	Scotland	52:02
35	Tom Burge	Wales	52:03
36	T. O'Reilly	Ireland	52:05
37	Joseph Orose	Belgium	52:10
38	Jack Prosser	Wales	52:20
39	Jean Linsen	Belgium	52:24
40	John Timmins	Ireland	52:25
41	T. King	Ireland	52:36
42	Leon Verheylesonne	Belgium	52:38
43	John Nalty	Ireland	52:46
44	A.S. Stone	Wales	53:02
45	Sam Palmer	Wales	53:12
46	Emile Goetleven	Belgium	53:23
47	Edgard Viseur	Belgium	53:24
48	James Gardiner	Scotland	53:41
49	René Vincent	Belgium	54:14
50	R. Simons	Wales	54:21
51	Wilf Short	Wales	55:07
—	Georges Leclerc	France	DNF
—	Roger Rérolle	France	DNF
—	Maurice Waltispurger	France	DNF

=== Women's (1.9 mi / 3.0 km, unofficial) ===
Rank	Athlete	Nationality	Time
1st place, gold medalist(s)	Gladys Lunn	England	11:12
2nd place, silver medalist(s)	Lilian Styles	England	11:25
3rd place, bronze medalist(s)	Suzanne Lenoir	France	
4	Ruth Christmas	England	
5	Sebastienne Guyot	France	
6	Marguerite Battu	France	
7	Madeleine Massonneau	France	
8	Martine Leroux	France	
9	Doris Butterfield	England	
10	Jeanne Souffriau	Belgium	
11	Renée Trente	France	
12	Marie-Louise Bondu	Belgium	
13	Josée Mariani	Belgium	
14	Eileen Stringer	England	
15	Madeleine Fulcher	England	
16	Lucie Petit	Belgium	

== Team Results ==
=== Men's ===
Rank	Country	Team	Points
1	England	Jack Winfield; Tom Evenson; Jack Potts; Jack Holden; Frank Deakin; Arthur Allum	32
2	Scotland	Robbie Sutherland; John Suttie Smith; Jimmy Wood; Walter Gunn; David Fry; Charles Wilson	102
2	France	Henri Lahitte; Robert Loiseau; Marcel Michot; Albert Auvray; Pierre Louchard; Sauveur Tapias	102
4	Ireland	Tim Smythe; Thomas Kinsella; F. Mills; J.C. McIntyre; J. Behan; T. O'Reilly	112
5	Wales	Harry Gallivan; Danny Phillips; Ernie Thomas; Tom Burge; Jack Prosser; A.S. Stone	184
6	Belgium	Oscar van Rumst; Theo Meersman; Julien Serwy; Joseph Orose; Jean Linsen; Leon Verheylesonne	201

=== Women's (unofficial) ===
Rank	Country	Team	Points
1	England	Gladys Lunn; Lilian Styles; Ruth Christmas; Doris Butterfield	15
2	France	Suzanne Lenoir; Sebastienne Guyot; Marguerite Battu; Madeleine Massonneau	21
3	Belgium	Jeanne Souffriau; Marie-Louise Bondu; Josée Mariani; Lucie Petit	42

== Participation ==
=== Men's ===
An unofficial count yields the participation of 54 male athletes from 6 countries.

- Belgium (9)
- England (9)
- France (9)
- Ireland (9)
- Scotland (9)
- Wales (9)

=== Women's ===
An unofficial count yields the participation of 16 female athletes from 3 countries.

- Belgium (4)
- England (6)
- France (6)
