= 1935 International Cross Country Championships =

- Organisers: ICCU
- Edition: 28th
- Date: March 23 (men); March 20 (women)
- Host city: Paris-Auteuil, France (men); Morecambe, Lancashire, England (women)
- Venue: Hippodrome d'Auteuil (men); The Old Golf Links (women)
- Events: 1 / 1
- Distances: 9 mi (14.5 km) men 1.9 mi (3.0 km) women (unofficial)
- Participation: 61 (men) / 11 (women) athletes from 7 (men) / 2 (women) nations

The 1935 International Cross Country Championships was held in Auteuil, France, at the Hippodrome d'Auteuil on March 23. An unofficial women's championship was held in Morecambe, England on March 20, 1935, but only a report on the men's event was given in the Glasgow Herald.

Complete results for men, and for women (unofficial), medalists, and the results of British athletes were published.

== Medalists ==
Event	Gold		Silver		Bronze	
Individual
Men; 9 mi (14.5 km)	Jack Holden; England	47:52	Bill Wylie; Scotland	48:12	William Eaton; England	48:14
Women (unofficial); 1.9 mi (3.0 km)	Nellie Halstead; England	20:06	Lilian Styles; England	20:12	Esther Raven; England	20:18
Team
Men	England	30	Scotland	84	France	102
Women (unofficial)	England	10	Scotland	26		

== Individual Race Results ==
=== Men's (9 mi / 14.5 km) ===
Rank	Athlete	Nationality	Time
1st place, gold medalist(s)	Jack Holden	England	47:52
2nd place, silver medalist(s)	Bill Wylie	Scotland	48:12
3rd place, bronze medalist(s)	William Eaton	England	48:14
4	Frank Close	England	48:20
5	Oscar van Rumst	Belgium	48:25
6	Frank Marsland	England	48:26
7	Roland Walker	England	48:28
8	Harry Gallivan	Wales	48:33
9	Alec Burns	England	48:55
10	Alex Dow	Scotland	49:04
11	Roger Rérolle	France	49:09
12	John Suttie Smith	Scotland	49:10
13	Jim Flockhart	Scotland	49:17
14	Tom Evenson	England	49:24
15	André-Louis Laforge	France	49:26
16	Robert Arnold	France	49:37
17	André Angeard	France	49:37
18	Jean Thierry	France	49:41
19	Willie Sutherland	Scotland	49:43
20	Jack Potts	England	49:44
21	Jeronimo Joan	Spain	49:46
22	Macario Meneses	Spain	49:52
23	George Bailey	England	50:04
24	Victor Hamilton	Northern Ireland	50:07
25	Charles Poharec	France	50:11
26	W.A. McCune	Northern Ireland	50:17
27	Fernand Le Heurteur	France	50:22
28	James Freeland	Scotland	50:24
29	Arthur Williams	Wales	50:26
30	Walter Hinde	Scotland	50:28
31	Danny Phillips	Wales	50:30
32	Roger Rochard	France	50:36.2
33	Frans Vandersteen	Belgium	
34	Pedro Iradi	Spain	
35	René van Broeck	Belgium	50:46.2
36	Lucien Tostain	France	50:53
37	Ivor Brown	Wales	50:55
38	Louis Willemyns	Belgium	51:00
39	Tom Richards	Wales	51:15
40	Jean Coisne	Belgium	51:20
41	Manuel Andreu	Spain	
42	Charles Smith	Scotland	
43	Ernie Thomas	Wales	
44	Santiago Coll	Spain	
45	Francisco Cami	Spain	
46	W.L. Raddon	Wales	51:30
47	Jackie Campbell	Scotland	51:35
48	M. Gorman	Northern Ireland	51:40
49	Pat Blair	Northern Ireland	
50	Oscar Naert	Belgium	
51	Luis Miro	Spain	
52	Bob Patterson	Northern Ireland	
53	Maurice Maréchal	Belgium	
54	James Montgomery	Northern Ireland	
55	Victor Honorez	Belgium	
56	Georges Depotter	Belgium	53:20
57	Johnny Glenholmes	Northern Ireland	
58	Ken Harris	Wales	
59	W. Gardiner	Northern Ireland	
60	Cipriano Cilleruelo	Spain	
—	Juan Ramos	Spain	DNF

=== Women's (1.9 mi / 3.0 km) ===
Rank	Athlete	Nationality	Time
1st place, gold medalist(s)	Nellie Halstead	England	20:06
2nd place, silver medalist(s)	Lilian Styles	England	20:12
3rd place, bronze medalist(s)	Esther Raven	England	20:18
4	Nellie Bishop	England	21:16
5	Mary French	England	21:28
6	Gwendoline Camfield	England	21:31
7	Constantine Johnson	Scotland	21:35
8	Jean Tait	Scotland	21:39
9	Mildred Storrar	Scotland	22:29
10	Barbara Anderson	Scotland	22:36
11	Inglis Miller	Scotland	23:34

== Team Results ==
=== Men's ===
Rank	Country	Team	Points
1	England	Jack Holden; William Eaton; Frank Close; Frank Marsland; Roland Walker; Alec Burns	30
2	Scotland	Bill Wylie; Alex Dow; John Suttie Smith; Jim Flockhart; Willie Sutherland; James Freeland	84
3	France	Roger Rérolle; André-Louis Laforge; Robert Arnold; André Angeard; Jean Thierry; Charles Poharec	102
4	Wales	Harry Gallivan; Arthur Williams; Danny Phillips; Ivor Brown; Tom Richards; Ernie Thomas	187
5	Belgium	Oscar van Rumst; Frans Vandersteen; René van Broeck; Louis Willemyns; Jean Coisne; Oscar Naert	201
6	Spain	Jeronimo Joan; Macario Meneses; Pedro Iradi; Manuel Andreu; Santiago Coll; Francisco Cami	207
7	Northern Ireland	Victor Hamilton; W.A. McCune; M. Gorman; Pat Blair; Bob Patterson; James Montgomery	253

=== Women's ===
Rank	Country	Team	Points
1	England	Nellie Halstead; Lilian Styles; Esther Raven; Nellie Bishop	10
2	Scotland	Constantine Johnson; Jean Tait; Mildred Storrar; Barbara Anderson	26

== Participation ==
=== Men's ===
An unofficial count yields the participation of 61 male athletes from 7 countries.

- Belgium (9)
- England (9)
- France (9)
- Northern Ireland (8)
- Scotland (9)
- Spain (9)
- Wales (8)

=== Women's ===
An unofficial count yields the participation of 11 female athletes from 2 countries.

- England (6)
- Scotland (5)
