= 1955 International Cross Country Championships =

- Organisers: ICCU
- Edition: 42nd
- Date: 19 March (men); 26 March (women)
- Host city: San Sebastián, Euskadi, Spain (men); Ayr, Ayrshire, Scotland (women)
- Venue: Lasarte Hippodrome (men)
- Events: 1 / 1
- Distances: 9 mi (14.5 km) men / 1.9 mi (3.0 km) women
- Participation: 70 (men) / 12 (women) athletes from 8 (men) / 2 (women) nations

British Pathe Highlights

The 1955 International Cross Country Championships was held in San Sebastián, Spain, at the Lasarte Hippodrome on 19 March 1955. In addition, an unofficial women's championship was held one week later at Ayr, Scotland on 26 March 1955. A report on the men's event as well as the women's event was given in the Glasgow Herald.

Complete results for men, and for women (unofficial), medalists, and the results of British athletes were published.

== Medalists ==
Event	Gold		Silver		Bronze	
Individual
Men; 9 mi (14.5 km)	Frank Sando; England	46:09	Hugh Foord; England	46:33	Ken Norris; England	46:35
Women (unofficial); 1.9 mi (3.0 km)	Diane Leather; England	16:08	Anne Oliver; England	16:31	Leila Buckland; England	16:45
Team
Men	England	27	Belgium	102	Spain	109
Women (unofficial)	England	10	Scotland	34		

== Individual Race Results ==
=== Men's (9 mi / 14.5 km) ===
Rank	Athlete	Nationality	Time
1st place, gold medalist(s)	Frank Sando	England	46:09
2nd place, silver medalist(s)	Hugh Foord	England	46:33
3rd place, bronze medalist(s)	Ken Norris	England	46:35
4	Lucien Theys	Belgium	46:41
5	Antonio Amoros	Spain	46:48
6	Patrick Ranger	England	46:54
7	Edward Hardy	England	46:55
8	Michael Maynard	England	46:56
9	Bakir Benaissa	France	46:57
10	Luis García	Spain	46:59
11	George Rhodes	England	47:06
12	Maurits van Laere	Belgium	47:10
13	Jean-Louis Com	France	47:18
14	Manuel Faria	Portugal	47:25
15	Frans Herman	Belgium	47:28
16	Roger Deweer	Belgium	47:36
17	Mohamed Bensaid	France	47:42
18	João Silva	Portugal	47:43
19	Pierre Prat	France	47:48
20	Kenneth Caulder	England	47:49
21	Francisco Irizar	Spain	47:50
22	Felicito Cerezo	Spain	47:53
23	Félix Bidegui	Spain	47:55
24	Belkacem Chikhane	France	47:57
25	José Araújo	Portugal	48:01
26	Marcel Davignon	Belgium	48:03
27	Bill Boak	England	48:04
28	Antonio Aguirre	Spain	48:09
29	Marcel Vandewattyne	Belgium	48:19
30	Enrique Moreno	Spain	48:20
31	David Richards Jun.	Wales	48:24
32	Ken Huckle	Wales	48:25
33	Phil Morgan	Wales	48:26
34	Serge Blusson	France	48:30
35	Eddie Bannon	Scotland	48:31
36	Denis O'Gorman	Ireland	48:35
37	John Disley	Wales	48:41
38	Pierre de Pauw	Belgium	48:44
39	Tony Pumfrey	Wales	48:46
40	Norman Wilson	Wales	48:47
41	Filipe Luis	Portugal	48:48
42	Donald Henson	Scotland	48:58
43	Jaime Guixa	Spain	49:00
44	Charlie Owens	Ireland	49:03
45	Maurice Chiclet	France	49:11
46	Richard Daniels	Belgium	49:12
47	António Ventura	Portugal	49:13
48	John McLaren	Scotland	49:25
49	Frans van der Hoeven	Belgium	49:31
50	Lucas Larraza	Spain	49:35
51	Willie Lindsay	Scotland	49:36
52	Andy Brown	Scotland	49:38
53	Johnny Marshall	Ireland	49:41
54	Joe McGhee	Scotland	49:47
55	Brian James	Wales	49:59
56	Augusto Silva	Portugal	49:59
57	Tom Stevenson	Scotland	50:12
58	Jim Douglas	Ireland	50:37
59	Joaquim Santos	Portugal	50:51
60	Joe Stevenson	Scotland	50:54
61	Willy Dodds	Ireland	50:56
62	Armando Silva	Portugal	50:57
63	Robert Hanna	Ireland	51:36
64	Lyn Bevan	Wales	51:46
65	Adam Brown	Ireland	51:56
66	Don Appleby	Ireland	52:18
67	Frazer Walker	Ireland	54:29
—	Lahcen Ben Allal	France	DNF
—	Maurice Simonnet	France	DNF
—	Ian Binnie	Scotland	DNF

=== Women's (1.9 mi / 3.0 km, unofficial) ===
Rank	Athlete	Nationality	Time
1st place, gold medalist(s)	Diane Leather	England	16:08
2nd place, silver medalist(s)	Anne Oliver	England	16:31
3rd place, bronze medalist(s)	Leila Buckland	England	16:45
4	June Bridgland	England	16:57
5	Marian Davies	England	17:00
6	Madeline Wooller	England	17:01
7	Catherine Boyce	Scotland	18:18
8	Anne Drummond	Scotland	18:40
9	Elizabeth McLeod	Scotland	18:47
10	Mollie Ferguson	Scotland	19:15
11	Doreen Fulton	Scotland	19:20
12	Agnes Elder	Scotland	19:25

== Team Results ==
=== Men's ===
Rank	Country	Team	Points
1	England	Frank Sando; Hugh Foord; Ken Norris; Patrick Ranger; Edward Hardy; Michael Maynard	27
2	Belgium	Lucien Theys; Maurits van Laere; Frans Herman; Roger Deweer; Marcel Davignon; Marcel Vandewattyne	102
3	Spain	Antonio Amoros; Luis García; Francisco Irizar; Felicito Cerezo; Félix Bidegui; Antonio Aguirre	109
4	France	Bakir Benaissa; Jean-Louis Com; Mohamed Bensaid; Pierre Prat; Belkacem Chikhane; Serge Blusson	116
5	Portugal	Manuel Faria; João Silva; José Araújo; Filipe Luis; António Ventura; Augusto Silva	201
6	Wales	David Richards Jun. Ken Huckle; Phil Morgan; John Disley; Tony Pumfrey; Norman Wilson	212
7	Scotland	Eddie Bannon; Donald Henson; John McLaren; Willie Lindsay; Andy Brown; Joe McGhee	282
8	Ireland	Denis O'Gorman; Charlie Owens; Johnny Marshall; Jim Douglas; Willy Dodds; Robert Hanna	315

=== Women's (unofficial) ===
Rank	Country	Team	Points
1	England	Diane Leather; Anne Oliver; Leila Buckland; June Bridgland	10
2	Scotland	Catherine Boyce; Anne Drummond; Elizabeth McLeod; Mollie Ferguson	34

== Participation ==
=== Men's ===
An unofficial count yields the participation of male 70 athletes from 8 countries.

- Belgium (9)
- England (9)
- France (9)
- Ireland (9)
- Portugal (8)
- Scotland (9)
- Spain (9)
- Wales (8)

=== Women's ===
An unofficial count yields the participation of 12 female athletes from 2 countries.

- England (6)
- Scotland (6)
