= 1954 International Cross Country Championships =

- Organisers: ICCU
- Edition: 41st
- Date: 27 March (men); 20 March (women)
- Host city: Birmingham, England
- Venue: Bromford Bridge Racecourse
- Events: 1 / 1
- Distances: 9 mi (14.5 km) men / 2.5 mi (4.0 km) women
- Participation: 62 (men) / 12 (women) athletes from 7 (men) / 2 (women) nations

The 1954 International Cross Country Championships was held in Birmingham, England, at the Bromford Bridge Racecourse on 27 March 1954. In addition, an unofficial women's championship was held one week earlier at the same place on 20 March 1954. A preview on the men's event, a report on the men's results as well as the women's results was given in the Glasgow Herald.

Complete results for men, and for women (unofficial), medallists, and the results of British athletes were published.

== Medallists ==
Event	Gold		Silver		Bronze	
Individual
Men; 9 mi (14.5 km)	Alain Mimoun; France	47:51	Ken Norris; England	48:13	Patrick Ranger; England	48:21
Women (unofficial); 2.5 mi (4.0 km)	Diane Leather; England	15:19	Anne Oliver; England	15:45	June Bridgland; England	16:12
Team
Men	England	29	France	85	Belgium	102
Women (unofficial)	England	10	Scotland	34		

== Individual Race results ==
=== Men's (9 mi / 14.5 km) ===
Rank	Athlete	Nationality	Time
1st place, gold medalist(s)	Alain Mimoun	France	47:51
2nd place, silver medalist(s)	Ken Norris	England	48:13
3rd place, bronze medalist(s)	Patrick Ranger	England	48:21
4	Frank Sando	England	48:25
5	Derek Walker	England	48:53
6	Lucien Hanswijk	Belgium	49:07
7	Peter Driver	England	49:09
8	Edward Hardy	England	49:10
9	Albert Chorlton	England	49:13
10	Marcel Vandewattyne	Belgium	49:15
11	Antonio Amoros	Spain	49:16
12	André Lecat	France	49:33
13	Edouard Dillien	Belgium	49:40
14	Eddie Bannon	Scotland	49:44
15	Boualem Labadie	France	49:49
16	L. Alami	France	49:53
17	Luis García	Spain	49:55
18	Ken Wood	England	49:59
19	Frans van der Hoeven	Belgium	50:01
20	Pierre Prat	France	50:10
21	Lahcen Ben Allal	France	50:12
22	Pedro Sierra	Spain	50:16
23	Amar Khallouf	France	50:19
24	Harry Fenion	Scotland	50:20
25	Roger Serroels	Belgium	50:26
26	Michael Maynard	England	50:30
27	Forbes McKenzie	Scotland	50:36
28	Joe Stevenson	Scotland	50:41
29	Frans Smets	Belgium	50:42
30	Félix Bidegui	Spain	50:45
31	Mohamed Ali Labidi	France	50:55
32	Felicito Cerezo	Spain	50:58
33	Phil Morgan	Wales	51:00
34	Francisco Irizar	Spain	51:05
35	Tony Pumfrey	Wales	51:16
36	Lucien Theys	Belgium	51:20
37	Archie Gibson	Scotland	51:24
38	Antonio Aguirre	Spain	51:25
39	Robert de Troyer	Belgium	51:35
40	Ronnie Kane	Scotland	51:39
41	Dyfrigg Rees	Wales	51:43
42	Terry Keegan	Ireland	51:45
43	J. McClelland	Ireland	51:51
44	Charlie Owens	Ireland	52:09
45	Marcel Davignon	Belgium	52:15
46	Enrique Moreno	Spain	52:20
47	Willy Dodds	Ireland	52:23
48	K.B. Harvey	Ireland	52:29
49	William Butcher	Wales	52:30
50	Joe McGhee	Scotland	52:35
51	Tommy Tracey	Scotland	52:47
52	Lyn Bevan	Wales	53:01
53	Tom Wood	Wales	53:18
54	Tom Stevenson	Scotland	53:42
55	Johnny Marshall	Ireland	53:49
56	Jim Douglas	Ireland	53:54
57	John Nash	Wales	54:08
58	George Phipps	Wales	54:19
59	Jack Dougan	Ireland	55:24
60	Gilbert Legge	Wales	55:43
–	Michel Ascarateil	France	DNF
–	Eddie McAvoy	Ireland	DNF

=== Women's (2.5 mi / 4.0 km, unofficial) ===
Rank	Athlete	Nationality	Time
1st place, gold medalist(s)	Diane Leather	England	15:19
2nd place, silver medalist(s)	Anne Oliver	England	15:45
3rd place, bronze medalist(s)	June Bridgland	England	16:12
4	Dilys Williams	England	16:23
5	Marian Davies	England	16:30
6	Norah Smalley	England	17:00
7	Anne Drummond	Scotland	17:29
8	Mary Wadler	Scotland	17:55
9	Agnes Elder	Scotland	19:01
10	Mollie Ferguson	Scotland	19:13
11	Betty Moffat	Scotland	20:20
12	Sheila Johnstone	Scotland	21:30

== Team results ==
=== Men's ===
Rank	Country	Team	Points
1	England	Ken Norris; Patrick Ranger; Frank Sando; Derek Walker; Peter Driver; Edward Hardy	29
2	France	Alain Mimoun; André Lecat; Boualem Labadie; L. Alami; Pierre Prat; Lahcen Ben Allal	85
3	Belgium	Lucien Hanswijck; Marcel Vandewattyne; Edouard Dillien; Frans van der Hoeven; Roger Serroels; Frans Smets	102
4	Spain	Antonio Amoros; Luis García; Pedro Sierra; Félix Bidegui; Felicito Cerezo; Francisco Irizar	146
5	Scotland	Eddie Bannon; Harry Fenion; Forbes McKenzie; Joe Stevenson; Archie Gibson; Ronnie Kane	170
6	Wales	Phil Morgan; Tony Pumfrey; Dyfrigg Rees; William Butcher; Lyn Bevan; Tom Wood	263
7	Ireland	Terry Keegan; J. McClelland; Charlie Owens; Willy Dodds; K.B. Harvey; Johnny Marshall	279

=== Women's (unofficial) ===
Rank	Country	Team	Points
1	England	Diane Leather; Anne Oliver; June Bridgland; Dilys Williams	10
2	Scotland	Anne Drummond; Mary Wadler; Agnes Elder; Mollie Ferguson	34

== Participation ==
=== Men's ===
An unofficial count yields the participation of 62 athletes from 7 countries.

- Belgium (9)
- England (9)
- France (9)
- Ireland (9)
- Scotland (9)
- Spain (8)
- Wales (9)

=== Women's ===
An unofficial count yields the participation of 12 female athletes from 2 countries.

- England (6)
- Scotland (6)

== See also ==
- 1954 in athletics (track and field)
