= 1910 International Cross Country Championships =

- Organisers: ICCU
- Edition: 8th
- Date: 26 March
- Host city: Belfast, Ulster, Ireland
- Venue: Belvoir Park
- Events: 1
- Distances: 10 mi (16.1 km)
- Participation: 43 athletes from 5 nations

The 1910 International Cross Country Championships was held in Belfast, Ireland, at the Belvoir Park on 26 March 1910. A report on the event was given in the Glasgow Herald.

Complete results, medalists, and the results of British athletes were published.

== Medalists ==
Event	Gold		Silver		Bronze	
Individual
Men; 10 mi (16.1 km)	Edward Wood; England	54:02	Puck O'Neill; Ireland	54:24	Harry Baldwin; England	54:24
Team
Men	England	35	Ireland	56	Scotland	102

== Individual Race Results ==
=== Men's (10 mi / 16.1 km) ===
Rank	Athlete	Nationality	Time
1st place, gold medalist(s)	Edward Wood	England	54:02
2nd place, silver medalist(s)	Puck O'Neill	Ireland	54:24
3rd place, bronze medalist(s)	Harry Baldwin	England	54:24
4	Charlie Harris	Ireland	56:09
5	A. Aldous	England	56:23
6	William Scott	England	56:28
7	James Murphy	Ireland	56:37
8	Alex McPhee	Scotland	56:39
9	Charles Ruffell	England	56:47
10	Sid Wilson	Wales	56:48
11	Ernest Massey	England	56:52
12	Frank Buckley	Ireland	57:05
13	Jack Cooke	England	57:11
14	Tom Downing	Ireland	57:22
15	James Duffy	Scotland	57:27
16	George MacKenzie	Scotland	57:32
17	James Hughes	Ireland	57:41
18	F.J. Isles	Wales	57:57
19	Robert Gilbert	Scotland	58:15
20	John Templeman	Scotland	58:36
21	Ernest Paul	Wales	58:38
22	Frank Ryder	Ireland	58:50
23	Marcel Courbaton	France	59:01
24	Alex Mann	Scotland	59:04
25	Louis Pauteix	France	59:17
26	Tom Jack	Scotland	59:20
27	Louis Allais	France	59:21
28	Jacques Versel	France	59:24
29	Jack Meyrick	Wales	59:45
30	Tommy Arthur	Wales	1:00:19
31	Dai Frances	Wales	1:00:20
32	E. Guigouresse	France	1:00:28
33	B. Parker	Ireland	1:00:30
34	J. Coombs	Wales	1:00:45
35	Bill Johnson	Wales	1:01:11
—	Jean Bouin	France	DNF
—	Alexandre Fayollat	France	DNF
—	Frederick Hibbins	England	DNF
—	George Wallach	Scotland	DNF
—	Georges Filiatre	France	DNF
—	William Bowman	Scotland	DNF
—	T. Harry	Wales	DNF
—	Jim Kerr	Ireland	DNF

== Team Results ==
=== Men's ===
Rank	Country	Team	Points
1	England	Edward Wood; Harry Baldwin; A. Aldous; William Scott; Charles Ruffell; Ernest Massey	35
2	Ireland	Puck O'Neill; Charlie Harris; James Murphy; Frank Buckley; Tom Downing; James Hughes	56
3	Scotland	Alex McPhee; James Duffy; George MacKenzie; Robert Gilbert; John Templeman; Alex Mann	102
4	Wales	Sid Wilson; F.J. Isles; Ernest Paul; Jack Meyrick; Tommy Arthur; Dai Frances	139
—	France	Marcel Courbaton; Louis Pauteix; Louis Allais; Jacques Versel; E. Guigouresse; Jean Bouin	DNF

== Participation ==
An unofficial count yields the participation of 43 athletes from 5 countries.

- England (8)
- France (8)
- Ireland (9)
- Scotland (9)
- Wales (9)

== See also ==
- 1910 in athletics (track and field)
