= 1927 International Cross Country Championships =

- Organisers: ICCU
- Edition: 20th
- Date: 2 April
- Host city: Caerleon, Monmouthshire, Wales
- Venue: Caerleon Racecourse
- Events: 1
- Distances: 9 mi (14.5 km)
- Participation: 44 athletes from 5 nations

The 1927 International Cross Country Championships was held in Caerleon, Wales, at the Caerleon Racecourse on 2 April 1927. A report on the event was given in the Glasgow Herald, and on Track Stats.

Complete results, medalists, and the results of British athletes were published.

== Medalists ==
| Event | Gold | | Silver | | Bronze | |
|---|---|---|---|---|---|---|
Individual
| Men; 9 mi (14.5 km) | Lewis Payne; England | 51:40 | Seghir Beddari; France | 51:49 | Henri Gallet; France | 52:03 |
Team
| Men | France | 49 | England | 61 | Scotland | 112 |

== Individual Race Results ==
=== Men's (9 mi / 14.5 km) ===
| Rank | Athlete | Nationality | Time |
|---|---|---|---|
| 1st place, gold medalist(s) | Lewis Payne | England | 51:40 |
| 2nd place, silver medalist(s) | Seghir Beddari | France | 51:49 |
| 3rd place, bronze medalist(s) | Henri Gallet | France | 52:03 |
| 4 | Frank Stevenson | Scotland | 52:05 |
| 5 | Walter Beavers | England | 52:08 |
| 6 | Ernie Thomas | Wales | 52:09 |
| 7 | Henri Lahitte | France | 52:16 |
| 8 | Ernie Harper | England | 52:18 |
| 9 | Roger Pelé | France | 52:19 |
| 10 | E.R. Leyshon | Wales | 52:20 |
| 11 | Emile Chapuis | France | 52:23 |
| 12 | Austin Price | England | 52:25 |
| 13 | Robert Miller | Scotland | 52:27 |
| 14 | Dunky Wright | Scotland | 52:36 |
| 15 | Henry Bowler | England | 52:48 |
| 16 | Pat Coyle | Ireland | 52:51 |
| 17 | Georges Leclerc | France | 53:01 |
| 18 | John Suttie Smith | Scotland | 53:04 |
| 19 | Léon Thierré | France | 53:14 |
| 20 | Tommy Metcalf | England | 53:21 |
| 21 | Danny Phillips | Wales | 53:25 |
| 22 | Jules Ladoumègue | France | 53:28 |
| 23 | Tommy Keating | Ireland | 53:30 |
| 24 | George Magan | Ireland | 53:43 |
| 25 | Patrick Groarke | Ireland | 53:48 |
| 26 | Ted Hopkins | Wales | 53:59 |
| 27 | Jimmy Guy | Wales | 54:17 |
| 28 | John Nalty | Ireland | 54:29 |
| 29 | Sam Ferris | Ireland | 54:32 |
| 30 | Frank Denmead | Wales | 54:45 |
| 31 | James Girvan | Scotland | 54:47 |
| 32 | Alex McMorran | Scotland | 54:52 |
| 33 | Larry Cummins | Ireland | 54:57 |
| 34 | Robert Marchal | France | 55:26 |
| 35 | L.S. Howells | Wales | 55:27 |
| 36 | George Forryan | England | 55:35 |
| 37 | J. Hughes | Wales | 55:43 |
| 38 | Ross Roxburgh | Scotland | 55:45 |
| 39 | Vincent Berry | Wales | 55:56 |
| 40 | Colin Fisher | England | 56:32 |
| 41 | M. Stewart | Scotland | 57:12 |
| 42 | W.C. Plant | Scotland | 57:15 |
| 43 | John Timmins | Ireland | 58:52 |
| — | Sammy Allnutt | England | DNF |

== Team Results ==
=== Men's ===
| Rank | Country | Team | Points |
|---|---|---|---|
| 1 | France | Seghir Beddari; Henri Gallet; Henri Lahitte; Roger Pelé; Emile Chapuis; Georges Leclerc | 49 |
| 2 | England | Lewis Payne; Walter Beavers; Ernie Harper; Austin Price; Henry Bowler; Tommy Metcalf | 61 |
| 3 | Scotland | Frank Stevenson; Robert Miller; Dunky Wright; John Suttie Smith; James Girvan; Alex McMorran | 112 |
| 4 | Wales | Ernie Thomas; E.R. Leyshon; Danny Phillips; Ted Hopkins; Jimmy Guy; Frank Denmead | 120 |
| 5 | Ireland | Pat Coyle; Tommy Keating; George Magan; Patrick Groarke; John Nalty; Sam Ferris | 145 |

== Participation ==
An unofficial count yields the participation of 44 athletes from 5 countries.

- England (9)
- France (9)
- Ireland (8)
- Scotland (9)
- Wales (9)

== See also ==
- 1927 in athletics (track and field)
