= 1909 International Cross Country Championships =

- Organisers: ICCU
- Edition: 7th
- Date: 20 March
- Host city: Derby, Derbyshire, England
- Venue: Derby Racecourse
- Events: 1
- Distances: 10 mi (16.1 km)
- Participation: 51 athletes from 5 nations

The 1909 International Cross Country Championships was held in Derby, England, at the Derby Racecourse on 20 March 1909. A report on the event was given in the Glasgow Herald.

Complete results, medalists, and the results of British athletes were published.

== Medalists ==
Event	Gold		Silver		Bronze	
Individual
Men; 10 mi (16.1 km)	Edward Wood; England	58:03	Jean Bouin; France	58:04	Ernest Loney; England	58:53
Team
Men	England	32	Ireland	77	Scotland	107

== Individual Race Results ==
=== Men's (10 mi / 16.1 km) ===
Rank	Athlete	Nationality	Time
1st place, gold medalist(s)	Edward Wood	England	58:03
2nd place, silver medalist(s)	Jean Bouin	France	58:04
3rd place, bronze medalist(s)	Ernest Loney	England	58:53
4	Bill Coales	England	59:16
5	Tom Downing	Ireland	59:24
6	Charlie Harris	Ireland	59:34
7	Fred Lord	England	1:00:04
8	Charles Straw	England	1:00:20
9	Jack Price	England	1:00:32
10	Ernest Barnes	England	1:00:36
11	William Bowman	Scotland	1:00:39
12	Marcel Courbaton	France	1:00:42
13	James Hughes	Ireland	1:00:58
14	Frank Buckley	Ireland	1:01:10
15	Alex Mann	Scotland	1:01:19
16	James Murphy	Ireland	1:01:21
17	James Duffy	Scotland	1:01:24
18	Tom Johnston	Scotland	1:01:24
19	Alexandre Fayollat	France	1:01:38
20	George MacKenzie	Scotland	1:01:45
21	J. Terris	France	1:01:47
22	Edgar Stead	Wales	1:01:48
23	Frank Ryder	Ireland	1:01:52
24	Victor Millerot	France	1:01:54
25	M.J. McHale	Ireland	1:02:08
26	Sam Watt	Scotland	1:02:10
27	Arthur Pateshall	England	1:02:11
28	M.J. McCann	Ireland	1:02:15
29	T. Elsmore	Wales	1:02:20
30	Ernest Paul	Wales	1:02:28
31	Harry Baldwin	England	1:02:31
32	Tommy Arthur	Wales	1:02:35
33	Paul Bouchard	France	1:02:38
34	Alex McPhee	Scotland	1:02:49
35	Arthur McGuffie	Scotland	1:02:51
36	Rhys Evans	Wales	1:03:07
37	Tom Jack	Scotland	1:03:10
38	P.B. Currey	Wales	1:03:12
39	Ben Christmas	Wales	1:03:25
40	Ernest Massey	England	1:03:58
41	Harry Sewell	England	1:04:48
42	Emile Verrier	France	1:04:54
43	R. Jones	Wales	1:05:08
44	Tom Pavey	Wales	1:05:25
45	P.J. McGuinness	Ireland	1:08:04
46	Llewellyn Lloyd	Wales	1:08:07
—	Sam Stevenson	Scotland	DNF
—	Jacques Versel	France	DNF
—	Georges Filiatre	France	DNF
—	P. Watters	Ireland	DNF
—	Edward Green	England	DNF

== Team Results ==
=== Men's ===
Rank	Country	Team	Points
1	England	Edward Wood; Ernest Loney; Bill Coales; Fred Lord; Charles Straw; Jack Price	32
2	Ireland	Tom Downing; Charlie Harris; James Hughes; Frank Buckley; James Murphy; Frank Ryder	77
3	Scotland	William Bowman; Alex Mann; James Duffy; Tom Johnston; George MacKenzie; Sam Watt	107
4	France	Jean Bouin; Marcel Courbaton; Alexandre Fayollat; J. Terris; Victor Millerot; Paul Bouchard	111
5	Wales	Edgar Stead; T. Elsmore; Ernest Paul; Tommy Arthur; Rhys Evans; P.B. Currey	187

== Participation ==
An unofficial count yields the participation of 51 athletes from 5 countries.

- England (12)
- France (9)
- Ireland (10)
- Scotland (10)
- Wales (10)

== See also ==
- 1909 in athletics (track and field)
