= 1956 International Cross Country Championships =

- Organisers: ICCU
- Edition: 43rd
- Date: 17 March
- Host city: Belfast, Northern Ireland (men); Upminster, Essex, England (women)
- Venue: Royal Ulster Showground (men)
- Events: 1 / 1
- Distances: 9 mi (14.5 km) men / 1.9 mi (3.0 km) women
- Participation: 70 (men) / 12 (women) athletes from 8 (men) / 2 (women) nations

The 1956 International Cross Country Championships was held in Belfast, Northern Ireland, at the Royal Ulster Showground on 17 March 1956. In addition, an unofficial women's championship was held the same day at Upminster, England on 17 March 1956. A report on the men's event as well as the women's event was given in the Glasgow Herald.

Complete results for men, and for women (unofficial), medalists, and the results of British athletes were published.

== Medalists ==
Event	Gold		Silver		Bronze	
Individual
Men; 9 mi (14.5 km)	Alain Mimoun; France	45:18	Frank Sando; England	45:28	Ken Norris; England	45:28
Women; 1.9 mi (3.0 km)	Roma Ashby; England	13:05	June Bridgland; England	13:11	Diane Leather; England	13:12
Team
Men	France	42	England	59	Belgium	131
Women	England	10	Scotland	34		

== Individual Race Results ==
=== Men's (9 mi / 14.5 km) ===
Rank	Athlete	Nationality	Time
1st place, gold medalist(s)	Alain Mimoun	France	45:18
2nd place, silver medalist(s)	Frank Sando	England	45:28
3rd place, bronze medalist(s)	Ken Norris	England	45:28
4	Fred Norris	England	45:36
5	Hamoud Ameur	France	45:42
6	Lahcen Ben Allal	France	45:44
7	Frans Herman	Belgium	45:46
8	Antonio Amoros	Spain	45:57
9	Bakir Benaissa	France	46:00
10	Said Benmaguini	France	46:10
11	Amar Khallouf	France	46:11
12	John McLaren	Scotland	46:12
13	Ken Gates	England	46:13
14	Pat Moy	Scotland	46:14
15	Luis García	Spain	46:27
16	Marcel Vandewattyne	Belgium	46:38
17	Peter Driver	England	46:41
18	Maurits van Laere	Belgium	46:45
19	Frans van der Hoeven	Belgium	46:49
20	Albert Chorlton	England	46:50
21	Paul Genève	France	46:52
22	Chris Suddaby	Wales	46:53
23	Manuel Faria	Portugal	46:57
24	António Ventura	Portugal	47:04
25	Hélio Duarte	Portugal	47:05
26	Abdallah Ould Lamine	France	47:14
27	Francisco Irizar	Spain	47:15
28	Charlie Owens	Ireland	47:28
29	João Silva	Portugal	47:30
30	José Araújo	Portugal	47:33
31	Ken Huckle	Wales	47:34
32	Don Appleby	Ireland	47:34
33	Eddie Bannon	Scotland	47:38
34	Pierre de Pauw	Belgium	47:44
35	David Richards Jun.	Wales	47:46
36	Davy Harrison	Ireland	47:47
37	Denis Jouret	Belgium	47:47
38	Joe Stevenson	Scotland	47:55
39	Tom Stevenson	Scotland	47:56
40	Bertie Messitt	Ireland	48:03
41	Bobby Calderwood	Scotland	48:06
42	Sergio Bueno	Spain	48:09
43	Tommy Dunne	Ireland	48:11
44	Lucas Larraza	Spain	48:15
45	Jim McCormack	Scotland	48:19
46	Derek Ibbotson	England	48:20
47	Filipe Luis	Portugal	48:31
48	John Disley	Wales	48:32
49	Jose Castro Ruibal	Spain	48:41
50	Andy Brown	Scotland	48:43
51	Alan Perkins	England	48:48
52	Jesús Hurtado	Spain	48:50
53	Jack Dougan	Ireland	48:53
54	Julien Vandevelde	Belgium	49:07
55	Augusto Silva	Portugal	49:15
56	Jim Mahood	Ireland	49:26
57	Terry Keegan	Ireland	49:31
58	Jimmy Todd	Ireland	49:37
59	Peter Bowden	Wales	49:42
60	Gordon Dunn	Scotland	49:47
61	Dyfrigg Rees	Wales	50:24
62	Mariano Martin	Spain	50:53
63	Ken Flowers	Wales	51:06
64	William Butcher	Wales	51:19
65	Richard Morgan	Wales	51:21
—	Hamida Addéche	France	DNF
—	Lucien Theys	Belgium	DNF
—	Félix Bidegui	Spain	DNF
—	Derek Walker	England	DNF
—	Joaquim Santos	Portugal	DNF

=== Women's (1.9 mi / 3.0 km, unofficial) ===
Rank	Athlete	Nationality	Time
1st place, gold medalist(s)	Roma Ashby	England	13:05
2nd place, silver medalist(s)	June Bridgland	England	13:11
3rd place, bronze medalist(s)	Diane Leather	England	13:12
4	Phyllis Perkins	England	13:23
5	Madeline Wooller	England	13:25
6	Maureen Bonnano	England	13:51
7	Anne Drummond	Scotland	14:35
8	Anne Herman	Scotland	15:11
9	Doreen Fulton	Scotland	15:17
10	Mollie Ferguson	Scotland	15:18
11	Elizabeth Steedman	Scotland	15:19
12	Mary Campbell	Scotland	16:05

== Team Results ==
=== Men's ===
Rank	Country	Team	Points
1	France	Alain Mimoun; Hamoud Ameur; Lahcen Ben Allal; Bakir Benaissa; Said Benmaguini; Amar Khallouf	42
2	England	Frank Sando; Ken Norris; Fred Norris; Ken Gates; Peter Driver; Albert Chorlton	59
3	Belgium	Frans Herman; Marcel Vandewattyne; Maurits van Laere; Frans van der Hoeven; Pierre de Pauw; Denis Jouret	131
4	Scotland	John McLaren; Pat Moy; Eddie Bannon; Joe Stevenson; Tom Stevenson; Bobby Calderwood	177
5	Portugal	Manuel Faria; António Ventura; Hélio Duarte; João Silva; José Araújo; Filipe Luis	178
6	Spain	Antonio Amoros; Luis García; Francisco Irizar; Sergio Bueno; Lucas Larraza; Jose Castro Ruibal	185
7	Ireland	Charlie Owens; Don Appleby; Davy Harrison; Bertie Messitt; Tommy Dunne; Jack Dougan	232
8	Wales	Chris Suddaby; Ken Huckle; David Richards Jun. John Disley; Peter Bowden; Dyfrigg Rees	256

=== Women's (unofficial) ===
Rank	Country	Team	Points
1	England	Roma Ashby; June Bridgland; Diane Leather; Phyllis Perkins	10
2	Scotland	Anne Drummond; Anne Herman; Doreen Fulton; Mollie Ferguson	34

== Participation ==
=== Men's ===
An unofficial count yields the participation of 70 male athletes from 8 countries.

- Belgium (8)
- England (9)
- France (9)
- Ireland (9)
- Portugal (8)
- Scotland (9)
- Spain (9)
- Wales (9)

=== Women's ===
An unofficial count yields the participation of 12 female athletes from 2 countries.

- England (6)
- Scotland (6)
