= 1947 International Cross Country Championships =

- Organisers: ICCU
- Edition: 34th
- Date: March 30
- Host city: Saint-Cloud, Île-de-France, France
- Venue: Hippodrome de Saint-Cloud
- Events: 1
- Distances: 9 mi (14.5 km)
- Participation: 54 athletes from 6 nations

The 1947 International Cross Country Championships was held in Saint-Cloud, France, at the Hippodrome de Saint-Cloud on March 30, 1947. A report on the event was given in the Glasgow Herald.

Complete results, medalists, and the results of British athletes were published.

== Medalists ==
Event	Gold		Silver		Bronze	
Individual
Men; 9 mi (14.5 km)	Raphaël Pujazon; France	50:26	Jean Chapelle; Belgium	50:51	Mohamed Lahoucine; France	51:04
Team
Men	France	34	Belgium	86	England	105

== Individual Race Results ==
=== Men's (9 mi / 14.5 km) ===
Rank	Athlete	Nationality	Time
1st place, gold medalist(s)	Raphaël Pujazon	France	50:26
2nd place, silver medalist(s)	Jean Chapelle	Belgium	50:51
3rd place, bronze medalist(s)	Mohamed Lahoucine	France	51:04
4	Georges Gaillot	France	51:19
5	Arsène Piesset	France	51:19
6	Alec Olney	England	51:19
7	Jim Flockhart	Scotland	51:36
8	Bert Hermans	Belgium	51:40
9	Jerry Kiely	Ireland	51:45
10	Paul Messner	France	51:52
11	Henri Leveque	France	51:53
12	Tony Chivers	England	51:54
13	Pat Haughey	Ireland	52:07
14	Marcel Vandewattyne	Belgium	52:14
15	Reg Gosney	England	52:15
16	André Valdovinos	France	52:20
17	Emile Renson	Belgium	52:26
18	Tom Walsh	Ireland	52:40
19	Emmet Farrell	Scotland	52:41
20	Bobby Reid	Scotland	52:48
21	Edouard Schroeven	Belgium	52:59
22	Bertie Robertson	England	53:01
23	Gordon Monshall	England	53:08
24	Frans Wauters	Belgium	53:13
25	Henri Klein	France	53:17
26	Andy Forbes	Scotland	53:23
27	Matt Smith	England	53:30
28	Frank Sinclair	Scotland	53:37
29	Kevin Maguire	Ireland	53:43
30	Norman Ashcroft	England	53:47
31	Patsy Fitzgerald	Ireland	53:49
32	Ivor Lloyd	Wales	53:53
33	J. Fitzgerald	Ireland	53:58
34	Frans Feremans	Belgium	54:09
35	Mohamed Brahim	France	54:23
36	G. Carolan	Ireland	54:29
37	Alex McGregor	Scotland	54:31
38	Gibby Anderson	Scotland	54:42
39	Laurence (Larry) Donnelly	Ireland	54:43
40	Len Herbert	England	54:44
41	Norman Jones	England	55:03
42	Tom Richards	Wales	55:28
43	James Reid	Scotland	55:30
44	Willy Sommerville	Scotland	55:56
45	Eric Williams	Wales	56:02
46	Martin Richards	Wales	56:15
47	J. Manning II	Ireland	56:15
48	Frans Smets	Belgium	57:20
49	Eddie Cooper	Wales	57:26
50	Glan Williams	Wales	57:45
51	Bill Richards	Wales	58:38
52	Ken Harris	Wales	59:23
—	Gaston Reiff	Belgium	DNF
—	Bernard Baldwin	Wales	DNF

== Team Results ==
=== Men's ===
Rank	Country	Team	Points
1	France	Raphaël Pujazon; Mohamed Lahoucine; Georges Gaillot; Arsène Piesset; Paul Messner; Henri Leveque	34
2	Belgium	Jean Chapelle; Bert Hermans; Marcel Vandewattyne; Emile Renson; Edouard Schroeven; Frans Wauters	86
3	England	Alec Olney; Tony Chivers; Reg Gosney; Bertie Robertson; Gordon Monshall; Matt Smith	105
4	Ireland	Jerry Kiely; Pat Haughey; Tom Walsh; Kevin Maguire; Patsy Fitzgerald; J. Fitzgerald	133
5	Scotland	Jim Flockhart; Emmet Farrell; Bobby Reid; Andy Forbes; Frank Sinclair; Alex McGregor	137
6	Wales	Ivor Lloyd; Tom Richards; Eric Williams; Martin Richards; Eddie Cooper; Glan Williams	264

== Participation ==
An unofficial count yields the participation of 54 athletes from 6 countries.

- Belgium (9)
- England (9)
- France (9)
- Ireland (9)
- Scotland (9)
- Wales (9)
