= 1946 International Cross Country Championships =

- Organisers: ICCU
- Edition: 33rd
- Date: 30 March
- Host city: Ayr, Ayrshire, Scotland
- Events: 1
- Distances: 9 mi (14.5 km)
- Participation: 54 athletes from 6 nations

The 1946 International Cross Country Championships was held in Ayr, Scotland, on 30 March 1946. A report on the event was given in the Glasgow Herald.

Complete results, medallists, and the results of British athletes were published.

== Medallists ==
Event	Gold		Silver		Bronze	
Individual
Men; 9 mi (14.5 km)	Raphaël Pujazon; France	51:51.2	Marcel Vandewattyne; Belgium	52:24	Paul Messner; France	52:49
Team
Men	France	43	Belgium	77	England	96

== Individual Race Results ==
=== Men's (9 mi / 14.5 km) ===
Rank	Athlete	Nationality	Time
1st place, gold medalist(s)	Raphaël Pujazon	France	51:51.2
2nd place, silver medalist(s)	Marcel Vandewattyne	Belgium	52:24
3rd place, bronze medalist(s)	Paul Messner	France	52:49
4	Arsène Piesset	France	52:52
5	Pierre Cousin	France	52:55
6	Jack Holden	England	52:58
7	Reg Gosney	England	53:12
8	Henri Ost	Belgium	53:16
9	Frans Feremans	Belgium	53:21
10	Vic Draper	England	53:26
11	Pat Haughey	Ireland	53:31
12	Jimmy Nelson	Ireland	53:32
13	Edouard Schroeven	Belgium	53:41
14	Henri Leveque	France	53:43
15	Jim Flockhart	Scotland	53:50
16	Roger Petitjean	France	54:05
17	Henri de Belder	Belgium	54:15
18	Steve McCooke	Ireland	54:17
19	Kevin Maguire	Ireland	54:19
20	Ron Hughes	England	54:22
21	Len Herbert	England	54:33
22	René Chagnaud	France	54:41
23	Johnny Marshall	Ireland	54:46
24	Edmond Capel	France	54:59
25	Emmet Farrell	Scotland	55:00
26	Bobby Reid	Scotland	55:05
27	André Valdovinos	France	55:15
28	Emile Renson	Belgium	55:23
29	Jean Chapelle	Belgium	55:30
30	T. Henry	Ireland	55:33
31	Dillan Hier	Wales	55:35
32	Jack Corfield	England	55:46
33	Willy Sommerville	Scotland	55:50
34	Frank Froggart	England	55:57
35	Ivor Lloyd	Wales	55:59
36	Harry Howard	Scotland	56:05
37	Jack Carrick	England	56:12
38	Jan Steenhouwer	Belgium	56:16
39	Joseph Reamackers	Belgium	56:22
40	Tom Richards	Wales	56:25
41	J. Walkinshaw	Ireland	57:05
42	Eddie Cooper	Wales	57:24
43	Gordon Porteous	Scotland	57:36
44	Arthur Cole	England	57:38
45	Frank Bathgate	Ireland	57:59
46	Tom Gibson	Scotland	57:59
47	David Main	Ireland	58:33
48	Bill Richards	Wales	58:33
49	Charles McLennan	Scotland	59:21
50	Ken Harris	Wales	59:25
51	Dennis Morgan	Wales	1:00:08
52	Tom Christison	Wales	1:00:47
53	D.C. Saunders	Wales	1:01:13
54	Eddie McAllistar	Scotland	1:02:31

== Team Results ==
=== Men's ===
Rank	Country	Team	Points
1	France	Raphaël Pujazon; Paul Messner; Arsène Piesset; Pierre Cousin; Henri Leveque; Roger Petitjean	43
2	Belgium	Marcel Vandewattyne; Henri Ost; Frans Feremans; Edouard Schroeven; Henri de Belder; Emile Renson	77
3	England	Jack Holden; Reg Gosney; Vic Draper; Ron Hughes; Len Herbert; Jack Corfield	96
4	Ireland	Pat Haughey; Jimmy Nelson; Steve McCooke; Kevin Maguire; Johnny Marshall; T. Henry	113
5	Scotland	Jim Flockhart; Emmet Farrell; Bobby Reid; Willy Sommerville; Harry Howard; Gordon Porteous	178
6	Wales	Dillan Hier; Ivor Lloyd; Tom Richards; Eddie Cooper; Bill Richards; Ken Harris	246

== Participation ==
An unofficial count yields the participation of 54 athletes from 6 countries.

- Belgium (9)
- England (9)
- France (9)
- Ireland (9)
- Scotland (9)
- Wales (9)

== See also ==
- 1946 in athletics (track and field)
