= 1939 International Cross Country Championships =

- Organisers: ICCU
- Edition: 32nd
- Date: 1 April
- Host city: Cardiff, Glamorgan, Wales
- Venue: Ely Racecourse
- Events: 1
- Distances: 9 mi (14.5 km)
- Participation: 63 athletes from 7 nations

The 1939 International Cross Country Championships was held in Cardiff, Wales, at the Ely Racecourse on 1 April 1939. A report on the event was given in the Glasgow Herald.

Complete results, medallists, and the results of British athletes were published.

== Medallists ==
Event	Gold		Silver		Bronze	
Individual
Men; 9 mi (14.5 km)	Jack Holden; England	47:23	Mohamed El Ghazi; France	47:34	Salem Amrouche; France	47:52
Team
Men	France	36	England	95	Belgium	115

== Individual Race Results ==
=== Men's (9 mi / 14.5 km) ===
Rank	Athlete	Nationality	Time
1st place, gold medalist(s)	Jack Holden	England	47:23
2nd place, silver medalist(s)	Mohamed El Ghazi	France	47:34
3rd place, bronze medalist(s)	Salem Amrouche	France	47:52
4	Gaston Letisserand	France	48:08
5	Oscar Van Rumst	Belgium	48:15
6	Jean Chapelle	Belgium	48:20
7	Emmet Farrell	Scotland	48:21
8	Maurice Baudouin	France	48:39
9	André Glatigny	France	48:40
10	Joseph Guiomar	France	48:45
11	Ivor Brown	Wales	48:47
12	Jim Flockhart	Scotland	48:48
13	Albert Scheirs	Belgium	48:54
14	Sam Palmer	Wales	48:55
15	Alf Tyrer	England	48:57
16	Jack Potts	England	48:58
17	Gaston Tinard	France	48:59
18	Arthur Penny	England	49:00
19	Jack Emery	England	49:08
20	W.A. McCune	Northern Ireland	49:10
21	Alphonse van der Straeten	Belgium	49:15
22	Bobby McPherson	Scotland	49:17
23	Peter Allwell	Scotland	49:20
24	Harry Gallivan	Wales	49:24
25	Dillan Hier	Wales	49:29
26	Frank Reeve	England	49:30
27	Willie Sutherland	Scotland	49:31
28	René Leygues	France	49:33
29	James Ross	Scotland	49:34
30	Tom Richards	Wales	49:35
31	Bobby Reid	Scotland	49:43
32	Dennis Morgan	Wales	49:44
33	Adolphe Heuninck	Belgium	49:48
34	James O'Connor	Ireland	49:50
35	George Fox	Wales	49:58
36	Johnny Glenholmes	Northern Ireland	50:00
37	Robert Nevens	Belgium	50:02
38	Pierre Bajart	Belgium	50:08
39	M. Gorman	Northern Ireland	50:09
40	Anthony Etheridge	England	50:24
41	James Andrews	Northern Ireland	50:46
42	J. McEvoy	Ireland	50:58
43	Jack Noble	England	51:11
44	Reg Thomas	Wales	51:24
45	J. McCormick	Northern Ireland	51:25
46	Dan Gillespie	Northern Ireland	51:53
47	Bob Patterson	Northern Ireland	52:04
48	P. Cullen	Ireland	52:06
49	Arthur Williams	Wales	52:19
50	Michael Murphy	Ireland	52:35
51	Sam Grey	Ireland	
52	Pat Campbell	Ireland	
53	Paul Coburn	Ireland	
54	William Kennedy	Scotland	
55	C. Malone	Ireland	
—	Jean Wattiau	France	DNF
—	Edouard Schroeven	Belgium	DNF
—	Davy Cannavan	Northern Ireland	DNF
—	Albert van Meenen	Belgium	DNF
—	Archie Craig Jr.	Scotland	DNF
—	Ted Stimpson	England	DNF
—	Charlie McCooke	Northern Ireland	DNF
—	J.A. Crilly	Ireland	DNF

== Team Results ==
=== Men's ===
Rank	Country	Team	Points
1	France	Mohamed El Ghazi; Salem Amrouche; Gaston Letisserand; Maurice Baudouin; André Glatigny; Joseph Guiomar	36
2	England	Jack Holden; Alf Tyrer; Jack Potts; Arthur Penny; Jack Emery; Frank Reeve	95
3	Belgium	Oscar Van Rumst; Jean Chapelle; Albert Scheirs; Alphonse van der Straeten; Adolphe Heuninck; Robert Nevens	115
4	Scotland	Emmet Farrell; Jim Flockhart; Bobby McPherson; Peter Allwell; Willie Sutherland; James Ross	120
5	Wales	Ivor Brown; Sam Palmer; Harry Gallivan; Dillan Hier; Tom Richards; Dennis Morgan	136
6	Northern Ireland	W.A. McCune; Johnny Glenholmes; M. Gorman; James Andrews; J. McCormick; Dan Gillespie	227
7	Ireland	James O'Connor; J. McEvoy; P. Cullen; Michael Murphy; Sam Grey; Pat Campbell	277

== Participation ==
An unofficial count yields the participation of 63 athletes from 7 countries.

- Belgium (9)
- England (9)
- France (9)
- Ireland (9)
- Northern Ireland (9)
- Scotland (9)
- Wales (9)

== See also ==
- 1939 in athletics (track and field)
