= Newport Racecourse =

Defunct horse racing venue in Caerleon, Wales

Coordinates: 51.608°N 2.964°W

Newport Racecourse, also known as Caerleon Racecourse, was a horse racing venue located at Caerleon, near Newport, Wales which staged National Hunt racing from the 1840s until its closure in 1948.

The earliest known horse race meeting at Caerleon took place in 1845, although official results are not found until 1852. After 1854 no further racing took place in the area until the Llangibby and Tredegar Hunt staged meetings there in the 1880s and 1890s, usually in November. On 15 November 1899 the course was referred to as Newport for the first time, and it continued to host meetings in May and November each year until 1928, with a gap from 1913 to 1919 due to World War I. The May meeting was discontinued after the 1928 staging, leaving Newport with only one meeting in November until the start of World War II.

When Newport resumed racing after the war, fixtures increased. Eleven days were scheduled for the 1946–47 season although a number were cancelled due to bad weather. In 1947–48 eight days were scheduled and 30 March 1948 the course staged the Welsh Grand National for the only time, but the fixture held on 15 and 17 May 1948 proved to be the final National Hunt meeting held at Newport. In 1949 some pony racing was held at the course, but financial problems meant that no further racing of any kind took place at Newport after that year.

The course hosted the International Cross Country Championships in 1906, 1911, 1921, 1927 1933 and 1951.

The land now forms parts of Caerleon Golf Course and Caerleon Comprehensive School.
