= 1907 International Cross Country Championships =

- Organisers: ICCU
- Edition: 5th
- Date: 23 March 1907
- Host city: Glasgow, Scotland
- Venue: Glasgow Agricultural Society Show Grounds, Scotstoun
- Events: 1
- Distances: 10 mi (16.1 km)
- Participation: 56 athletes from 5 nations

The 1907 International Cross Country Championships took place on 23 March 1907. The race was held at the Glasgow Agricultural Society Show Grounds, Scotstoun in Glasgow, Scotland. It was the first year that athletes from France competed in the event.

Race results, and medalists were published in the Glasgow Herald.

== Participation ==
According to an unofficial count, 56 athletes participated from five countries:

- England (12)
- France (10)
- Ireland (10)
- Scotland (12)
- Wales (12)

== Medalists ==
Event	Gold		Silver		Bronze	
Individual
Men; 10 mi (16.1 km)	Adam Underwood; England	54:26.4	George Pearce; England	54:48	Sammy Welding; England	54:50
Team
Men	England	23	Scotland	85	Ireland	123

== Individual Race Results ==
=== Men's (10 mi / 16.1 km) ===
Rank	Athlete	Nationality	Time
1st place, gold medalist(s)	Adam Underwood	England	54:26.4
2nd place, silver medalist(s)	George Pearce	England	54:48
3rd place, bronze medalist(s)	Sammy Welding	England	54:50
4	Arthur Ashby	England	55:00
5	Tom Jack	Scotland	55:24
6	Harry Bennion	England	55:27
7	Billy Day	England	55:32
8	James Murphy	Ireland	55:35
9	Harry Young	Ireland	55:37
10	Jack Price	England	55:50
11	Gaston Ragueneau	France	55:59
12	W. Hulse	England	56:20
13	Jean Bouin	France	56:31
14	Pat Melville	Scotland	56:35
15	Thomas Robertson	Scotland	56:39
16	Tom Johnston	Scotland	56:44
17	William Bowman	Scotland	56:47
18	George MacKenzie	Scotland	56:48
19	Georges Cousin	France	56:53
20	H.S. Pullinger	England	57:12
21	Jacques Keyser	France	57:13
22	William Birtles	England	57:17
23	John Ranken	Scotland	57:28
24	Sam Carson	Scotland	57:42
25	Sam Lee	Ireland	57:46
26	W. Cooke	Ireland	57:47
27	Frank Buckley	Ireland	58:06
28	Tom Downing	Ireland	58:09
29	Ernest Rax	France	58:10
30	Edgar Ballon	France	58:15
31	Georges David	France	58:18
32	Edgar Price	Wales	58:25
33	D.H. Griffiths	Wales	58:43
34	Jack Smith	Ireland	59:02
35	Alexandre Fayollat	France	59:38
36	Louis Haller	France	59:43
37	Frank Pinkard	Wales	59:46
38	W. Fitzjohn	Wales	1:00:32
39	Ben Christmas	Wales	1:00:39
40	T. Bunford	Wales	1:01:17
41	Eddie Ace	Wales	1:01:35
42	Tommy Arthur	Wales	1:01:39
43	Adam Grieve	Scotland	1:02:34
44	W. Cooper	Wales	1:03:08
45	J. Moore	Ireland	1:03:15
46	Eddie Francis	Wales	1:03:22
—	Joe Deakin	England	DNF
—	Ernest Loney	England	DNF
—	E. Rosset	France	DNF
—	Charlie Harris	Ireland	DNF
—	G.W. Hill	Ireland	DNF
—	Albert Baker	Scotland	DNF
—	Alex McPhee	Scotland	DNF
—	James Ure	Scotland	DNF
—	Llewellyn Lloyd	Wales	DNF
—	Eddie O'Donnell	Wales	DNF

== Team Results ==
=== Men's ===
Rank	Country	Team	Points
1	England	Adam Underwood; George Pearce; Sammy Welding; Arthur Ashby; Harry Bennion; Billy Day	23
2	Scotland	Tom Jack; Pat Melville; Thomas Robertson; Tom Johnston; William Bowman; George MacKenzie	85
3	Ireland	James Murphy; Harry Young; Sam Lee; W. Cooke; Frank Buckley; Tom Downing	123
4	France	Gaston Ragueneau; Jean Bouin; Georges Cousin; Jacques Keyser; Ernest Rax; Edgar Ballon	123
5	Wales	Edgar Price; D.H. Griffiths; Frank Pinkard; W. Fitzjohn; Ben Christmas; T. Bunford	219

== See also ==
- 1907 in athletics (track and field)
