= Édouard Fabre =

Canadian marathon runner

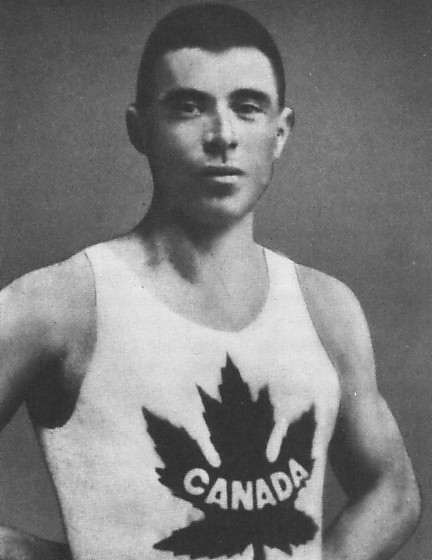
- Fabre in 1915

Personal information
- Born: August 21, 1885 Sainte-Geneviève, Quebec, Canada
- Died: July 1, 1939 (aged 53) Montreal, Quebec, Canada

Sport
- Country: Canada
- Sport: Marathon

Édouard Fabre (French pronunciation: [edwaʁ fabʁ]; August 21, 1885 – July 1, 1939) was a Canadian marathon runner.

Born in Sainte-Geneviève, Quebec, he won the Boston Marathon in 1915, with a time of 2:56:41.8. In 1914, he had come in second in the Boston Marathon to fellow Canadian James Duffy. In 1964, he was inducted into Canada's Sports Hall of Fame.

Parc Édouard-Fabre in Montreal is named in his honour.

== See also ==
- List of winners of the Boston Marathon
