= 1898 International Cross Country Championships =

- Organisers: ICCU
- Edition: Unofficial
- Date: March 20
- Host city: Ville-d'Avray, Île-de-France, France
- Events: 1
- Distances: 9 mi (14.5 km)
- Participation: 16 athletes from 2 nations

The unofficial 1898 International Cross Country Championships were held in Ville-d'Avray, France, on March 20, 1898, between 16 men from France and England. Complete results and English results are available.

== Medallists ==
Event	Gold		Silver		Bronze	
Individual; 9 mi (14.5 km)	Sidney Robinson; England	56:36	Harry Harrison; England	56:36.4	Charles Bennett; England	57:14.8
Team	England	21	France	69		

== Nine mile (14.5 km) results ==
Rank	Athlete	Nationality	Time
1st place, gold medalist(s)	Sidney Robinson	England	56:36
2nd place, silver medalist(s)	Harry Harrison	England	56:36.4
3rd place, bronze medalist(s)	Charles Bennett	England	57:14.8
4	Tommy Bartlett	England	57:22.6
5	Jack Marsh	England	57:48.4
6	Edward Barlow	England	57:51.2
7	J. Crook	England	58:44
8	Arthur Meacham	England	58:44
9	Georges Touquet-Daunis	France	59:08
10	H. Freeman	France	1:01:33
11	E. Pican	France	1:01:42
12	Joseph Genet	France	1:02:51
13	I. Hennequin	France	1:03:10
14	M. Dupré	France	1:03:18
15	Auguste Marchais	France	1:04:11
16	A. Aubert	France	1:04:18

== Team results ==
Rank	Country	Team	Points
1	England	Sidney Robinson; Harry Harrison; Charles Bennett; Tommy Bartlett; Jack Marsh; Edward Barlow	21
2	France	Georges Touquet-Daunis; H. Freeman; E. Pican; Joseph Genet; I. Hennequin; M. Dupré	69

== Participation ==
Eight athletes came from France and eight from England.
