= 1906 International Cross Country Championships =

- Organisers: ICCU
- Edition: 4th
- Date: 10 March
- Host city: Caerleon, Monmouthshire, Wales
- Venue: Caerleon Racecourse
- Events: 1
- Distances: 10 mi (16.1km)
- Participation: 44 athletes from 4 nations

The 1906 International Cross Country Championships was held in Caerleon, Wales, at the Caerleon Racecourse on 10 March 1906. A report on the event was given in the Glasgow Herald.

Complete results, medalists, and the results of British athletes were published.

== Medalists ==
Event	Gold		Silver		Bronze	
Individual
Men; 10 mi (16.1 km)	Charles Straw; England	57:32	George Pearce; England	57:55	Will Nelson; England	58:11
Team
Men	England	24	Ireland	86	Scotland	106

== Individual race results ==
=== Men's (10 mi / 16.1km) ===
Rank	Athlete	Nationality	Time
1st place, gold medalist(s)	Charles Straw	England	57:32
2nd place, silver medalist(s)	George Pearce	England	57:55
3rd place, bronze medalist(s)	Will Nelson	England	58:11
4	John Daly	Ireland	58:30
5	Joe Deakin	England	58:33
6	Jack Price	England	59:40
7	Sammy Welding	England	59:41
8	W.G. Dunkley	England	59:45
9	T. Hughes	Wales	59:52
10	Sam Stevenson	Scotland	1:00:25
11	John Hayes	Ireland	1:00:27
12	Francis Whittle	England	1:00:40
13	David Cather	Scotland	1:00:41
14	Charlie Harris	Ireland	1:00:46
15	Peter Russell	Scotland	1:00:55
16	R.E. Hughes	Scotland	1:00:57
17	Tommy Arthur	Wales	1:01:08
18	Pat Joyce	Ireland	1:01:09
19	Paul Kelly	Ireland	1:01:16
20	T. Mernagh	Ireland	1:01:40
21	George Butterfield	England	1:01:51
22	Tommy Greenall	England	1:01:52
23	Eddie Ace	Wales	1:02:20
24	Edgar Price	Wales	1:02:26
25	John Ranken	Scotland	1:02:34
26	W. Thomas	Wales	1:02:35
27	Thomas Robertson	Scotland	1:02:38
28	John Gilchrist	Scotland	1:03:19
29	T. Horton	Wales	1:03:21
30	J. Finnegan	Ireland	1:03:27
31	Harry Cleaver	Wales	1:03:30
32	William Muirden	Scotland	1:03:41
33	Joe Morris	Wales	1:03:52
34	Ernest Thomas	Wales	1:04:03
35	Alexander Matthews	Scotland	1:04:03
36	T. Bunford	Wales	1:04:10
—	James Beale	England	DNF
—	Billy Day	England	DNF
—	Tom Downing	Ireland	DNF
—	George Guthre	Scotland	DNF
—	Alex Mann	Scotland	DNF
—	Thomas Mulrine	Scotland	DNF
—	H.T. Johnstone	Wales	DNF
—	Eddie O'Donnell	Wales	DNF

== Team results ==
=== Men's ===
Rank	Country	Team	Points
1	England	Charles Straw; George Pearce; Will Nelson; Joe Deakin; Jack Price; Sammy Welding	24
2	Ireland	John Daly; John Hayes; Charlie Harris; Pat Joyce; Paul Kelly; T. Mernagh	86
3	Scotland	Sam Stevenson; David Cather; Peter Russell; R.E. Hughes; John Ranken; Thomas Robertson	106
4	Wales	T. Hughes; Tommy Arthur; Eddie Ace; Edgar Price; W. Thomas; T. Horton	128

== Participation ==
An unofficial count yields the participation of 44 athletes from 4 countries.

- England (12)
- Ireland (8)
- Scotland (12)
- Wales (12)

== See also ==
- 1906 in athletics (track and field)
