= 1940 International Cross Country Championships =

- Organisers: ICCU
- Edition: Unofficial
- Date: March 24
- Host city: Paris, France
- Venue: Bois de Boulogne
- Events: 1
- Distances: 5 mi (8.0 km)
- Participation: 27 athletes from 3 nations

The unofficial 1940 International Cross Country Championships was held in Paris, France, at the Bois de Boulogne on March 24, 1940. The event was open for male junior athletes.

Complete results, medalists, and the results of British athletes were published.

== Medalists ==
Event	Gold		Silver		Bronze	
Individual
Junior Men; 5 mi (8.0 km)	Frank Aaron; England	27:51	Gaston Cottin; France	28:00	Jack Timmins; England	28:09
Team
Junior Men	France	34	England	60	Belgium	102

== Individual Race Results ==
=== Junior Men's (5 mi / 8.0 km) ===
Rank	Athlete	Nationality	Time
1st place, gold medalist(s)	Frank Aaron	England	27:51
2nd place, silver medalist(s)	Gaston Cottin	France	28:00
3rd place, bronze medalist(s)	Jack Timmins	England	28:09
4	A. Poirot	France	28:19
5	Derrough	France	28:24
6	H. Silvestri	France	28:25
7	J. Boutin	France	28:34
8	Jack Charlesworth	England	28:36
9	Arthur Cole	England	28:37
10	G. Contat	France	28:43
11	M. Mainjollou	France	28:55
12	Henri Leveque	France	29:16
13	A. Kerromes	France	29:22
14	Gaston Reiff	Belgium	29:27
15	Michel Verlinden	Belgium	29:31
16	Louis Dubreucq	Belgium	
17	G. Harrison	England	
18	Andre De Roose	Belgium	
19	Francois Vandebossche	Belgium	
20	Laurent Van Dyck	Belgium	
21	Andre Van Steertegem	Belgium	
22	G.R. Nicholls	England	
23	T.B. Riley	England	
24	M. Rochart	Belgium	
—	G.B. Shaw	England	DNF
—	W.H. Marsh	England	DNF
—	Joseph de Borger	Belgium	DNF

== Team Results ==
=== Men's ===
Rank	Country	Team	Points
1	France	Gaston Cottin; A. Poirot; Derrough; H. Silvestri; J. Boutin; G. Contat	34
2	England	Frank Aaron; Jack Timmins; Jack Charlesworth; Arthur Cole; G. Harrison; G.R. Nicholls	60
3	Belgium	Gaston Reiff; Michel Verlinden; Louis Dubreucq; Andre De Roose; Francois Vandebossche; Laurent Van Dyck	102

== Participation ==
An unofficial count yields the participation of 27 athletes from 3 countries.

- Belgium (9)
- England (9)
- France (9)
