= Hugh Foord =

English long-distance runner (born 1929)

Personal information
- Nationality: British (English)
- Born: Q2. 1929 Brighton, England

Sport
- Sport: Athletics
- Event: long-distance
- Club: Brighton AC

Hugh Vivian Foord (born Q2. 1929) is an English former athlete.

== Biography ==
Foord was a member of the Brighton Athletic Club and finished third behind Ken Norris in the 6 miles event at the 1956 AAA Championships.

Foord finished second behind Stan Eldon in the 6 miles event at the 1958 AAA Championships and shortly afterwards, Foord represented the England athletics team in the 6 miles race at the 1958 British Empire and Commonwealth Games in Cardiff, Wales.

As of 2020, Foord was still actively running at the age of 91.
