= Georges Touquet-Daunis =

French track and field athlete

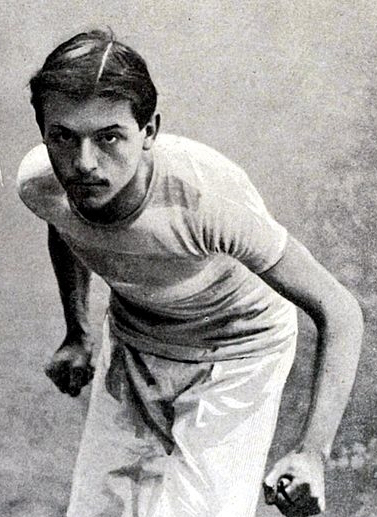
Georges Touquet-Daunis

Georges Célestin Touquet-Daunis (12 March 1879 in Paris – 16 April 1917 in Berry-au-Bac) was a French track and field athlete who competed at the 1900 Summer Olympics in Paris, France. Touquet-Daunis competed in the marathon. He was one of six runners who did not finish the race.

He was the first official holder of the 5k world record, running a 16:34.6 on 1897-10-31 in Paris, France. He later lowered the record to 16:29.2 on 1899-05-22.

A sergeant in the army, Touquet-Danis was killed in action during World War I.
