= Alec Burns (runner) =

British long-distance runner

Personal information
- Nationality: British (English)
- Born: 5 November 1907 Newcastle upon Tyne, England
- Died: 22 May 2003 (aged 95) Newcastle upon Tyne, England
- Height: 183 cm (6 ft 0 in)
- Weight: 66 kg (146 lb)

Sport
- Sport: Athletics
- Event: middle-distance
- Club: Elswick Harriers
Medal record
Men's athletics
Representing England
British Empire Games
Bronze medal – third place	1934 London	3 miles

James Alexander Burns (5 November 1907 – 22 May 2003) was an English track and field athlete who competed for Great Britain in the 1932 Summer Olympics and in the 1936 Summer Olympics.

== Biography ==
Burns was born in Newcastle upon Tyne. He became the national 4 miles champion after winning the British AAA Championships at the 1931 AAA Championships In 1932 at the Olympic Games, he finished seventh in the Olympic 5000 metres event.

Burns represented England at the 1934 British Empire Games, winning a bronze medal in the 3 miles contest.

Burns finished second behind Józef Noji in the 6 miles event and second behind William Eaton in the 10 miles event at the 1936 AAA Championships. One month later he was selected to represent Great Britain at the 1936 Olympic Games held in Berlin, where he finished fifth in the 10,000 metres competition.

Burns once again finished runner-up at the 1937 AAA Championships in both the 6 miles and 10 miles races.

His grandson was Richard Burns, the 2001 World Rally Champion.
