= Lucie Petit-Diagre =

French athlete

Personal information
- Nationality: Belgian
- Born: 24 July 1901 Paris, France
- Died: 14 December 2001 (aged 100) Dilbeek, Belgium

Sport
- Sport: Athletics
- Event: Discus throw

Lucie Petit-Diagre (24 July 1901 – 24 December 2001) was a Belgian athlete. She competed in the women's discus throw at the 1928 Summer Olympics.
