= Bill Cotterell =

British long-distance runner

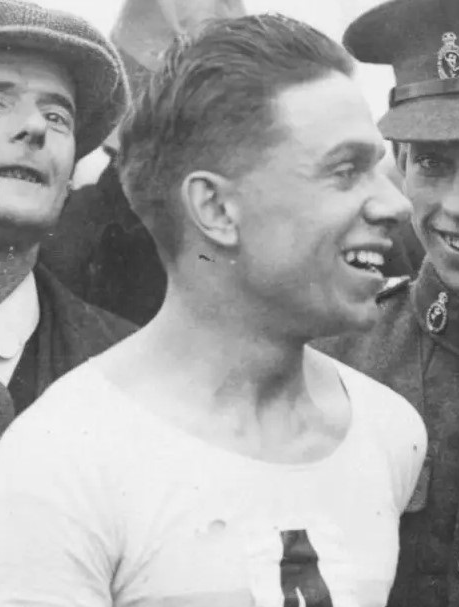

Personal information
- Nationality: British (English)
- Born: 10 February 1902 Crowthorne, England
- Died: 24 March 1986 (aged 84) Worthing, England

Sport
- Sport: Athletics
- Event: Long-distance running
- Club: Surrey AC; Royal Corps of Signals AC

William Mandeville Cotterell (10 February 1902 – 24 March 1986) was a British athlete who was selected for the 1924 Summer Olympics.

== Biography ==
Cotterell was born in Crowthorne, Berkshire and was a member of the Surrey Athletic Club.

Cotterell was a signaller and corporal in the Royal Corps of Signals and also competed for their athletics team. At the 1922 AAA Championships, he finished third in the 4 miles event behind Finn Paavo Nurmi.

In February 1924 he retained the Southern Athletic Championship, and won the English National Cross Country Championships, held in Doncaster, and the International Cross-country Championship Individual and team for England.

Cotterell also became the national 4 miles champion after winning the British AAA Championships title at the 1924 AAA Championships.

He was selected to represent Great Britain at the 1924 Summer Olympics in Paris, competing in the individual cross country but failed to start the race because shortly before the start of the Olympics he was involved in a motorcycle crash and broke his collar bone.

In 1925, he retained his English National Cross Country Championships title held in Hereford. and helped England win the International Cross-country Championship again.
