= Belvoir Park Golf Club =

Golf club in Belfast, Northern Ireland

- Location in Belfast
- 54.561466°N 5.914187°W

Club information
- Location: Belfast, Northern Ireland
- Established: 1927, 99 years ago
- Type: Private
- Tota holes: 18
- Tournaments: Irish Open (1949, 1953)
- Website: belvoirparkgolfclub.com

Belvoir Park GC
- Designed by: Harry Colt
- Par: 71
- Length: 6,595 yards (6,030 m)
- Course record: Charlie Cooley (Gross 62, nett 61)

The Belvoir Park Golf Club is in Belfast, Northern Ireland. The course has eighteen holes with a par of 71.

== History and attributes ==
The course was founded in 1927, designed by Harry Colt. Each round being just under 6,600 yards, Belvoir Park has played host to championships including the Irish Open in the late 1940s and the early 1950s and the Irish PGA Championship in 1995 the Irish Amateur close in 2009 and also the British Ladies amateur championship in 2011. The winner on that occasion, Harry Bradshaw took the view afterwards that it was "the best inland course I have ever played".

Famous golfers such as Peter Alliss and Fred Daly have rated the course one of the best inland courses in the British Isles.

The Belvoir Park Golf Club is accessed from Church Road (off Ormeau Road), Belfast. The course has eighteen holes with three sets of tees:

- A par of 71 from the white competition tees covering 6,270 yards (5,730 m)
- A par of 71 from the forward yellow tees covering 6,685 yards (6,113 m)
- A par of 70 from the championship blue tees covering 6,800 yards (6,200 m)

The course is immediately south of Belfast city centre and can be accessed in about 15 minutes from the city airport, city centre hotels and cruise liner port. To east and west are attractions: Belvoir Park Forest and Forestside Shopping centre; to the south is a motorway and to the north is an estate of large houses.
