= Jimmy Duffy =

Canadian runner (1890–1915)

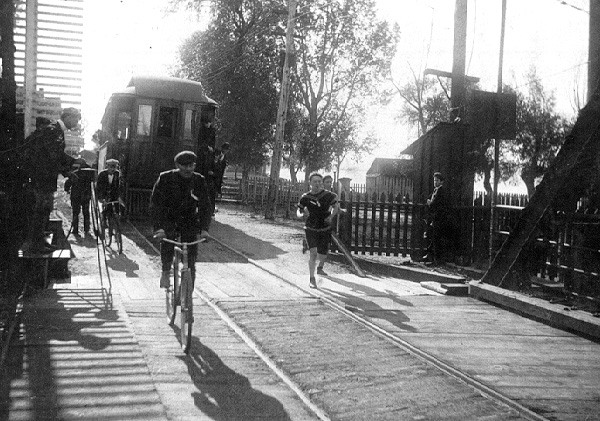
- Duffy on the bridge over Burlington Canal during the 1912 Around the Bay Road Race in Hamilton, Ontario

Personal information
- Nationality: Irish/Canadian
- Born: May 1, 1890 County Leitrim, Ireland
- Died: April 23, 1915 (aged 24) Ypres, Belgium

Sport
- Sport: Athletics
- Event: long-distance/marathon
- Club: Edinburgh Southern Harriers; Eaton Athletic Club

James Duffy (May 1, 1890 – April 23, 1915) was a distance runner from Canada, one of the world's best marathon runners at the beginning of the 20th century. He participated in the 1912 Summer Olympics in Stockholm and was the winner of the 1914 Boston Marathon.

== Biography ==
Born in Ireland, Duffy grew up in Edinburgh, Scotland, after moving there with his family as a child. According to his own later account, Duffy participated in cross-country races in Scotland, winning many of them. He was a member of the Edinburgh Southern Harriers.

In 1911, he emigrated to Canada, where he worked in Toronto as a tinsmith and stonecutter. In his spare time, he visited the Central YMCA, the director of which quickly recognized his talent.

Representing the Central YMCA, Duffy came in second in the 1911 Ward Marathon, a 20-mile (32 km) event in Toronto. During the race, Duffy stopped to argue with supporters of another runner. In May 1912, he ran the Spectator Marathon in Hamilton, Ontario, which served that year as the Canadian Olympic trial. The race was reduced to 19 miles (31 km) and was run in exceedingly hot and humid weather. Only eight of twenty-five starters finished the race. Duffy himself had overestimated his strength but qualified for the Olympics by finishing in second place behind Harry Jensen of the United States, who passed him in the final mile and won by twenty seconds.

Representing the Eaton Athletic Club of Toronto, Duffy placed fifth in the marathon at the 1912 Summer Olympics in Stockholm, which also took place in very high temperatures, resulting in the death of Portuguese runner Francisco Lázaro. In October 1912 Duffy won both the Ward Marathon and the Hamilton Herald's race around Hamilton Bay, setting a new course record in the latter event. After the Hamilton Bay race, Duffy accepted full-time coaching from athletic trainer Tommy Thomson, who persuaded him to relocate to Hamilton, where he joined the Ramblers Club.

With Thomson as trainer, Duffy won seven consecutive marathons, including one in Yonkers, New York. On April 20, 1914, Duffy won the Boston Marathon in 2:25:01. His success had gotten around, and he was so much the favorite that the Boston bookmakers would not take high bets on his victory. The race developed into a thriller, with fellow Canadian runner Édouard Fabre matching Duffy's pace throughout. Only in the final mile did Duffy gain a small lead, winning the race by fifteen seconds. Duffy's first request after his victory was for a cigarette, and after his post-race medical examination, he asked for a bottle of beer.

After the Boston Marathon, Duffy turned professional, losing his first professional race to Édouard Fabre. Duffy enlisted in the Canadian Army at the outbreak of World War I. He joined the 91st Argyle Regiment and was subsequently transferred to the 16th Battalion of the Canadian Expeditionary Force.

Duffy was killed in a charge against the Germans while serving with the 16th Battalion in the Second Battle of Ypres on April 23, 1915, eight days before his twenty-fifth birthday and four days after Édouard Fabre won the 1915 Boston Marathon.

== See also ==
- List of winners of the Boston Marathon
- List of Olympians killed in World War I
