= Harry Payne (athlete) =

British long-distance runner

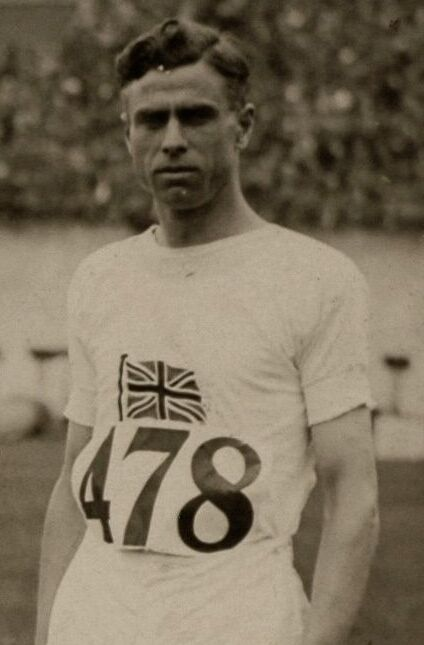
- Payne at the 1928 Summer Olympics

Personal information
- Nationality: British (English)
- Born: 5 September 1892 Oakley, England
- Died: 5 July 1969 (aged 76) Theydon Bois, England

Sport
- Sport: Athletics
- Event: long-distance
- Club: Woodford Green AC

Harry William Payne (5 September 1892 – 5 July 1969) was a British long-distance runner who competed in the marathon at the 1928 Summer Olympics in Amsterdam and was a two-time national champion. He was born in Bedfordshire.

== Athletics ==
On 26 May 1928, Payne debuted at the marathon distance and posted a fourth-place finish at the Polytechnic Marathon (2:54:50.8). Six weeks later on 6 July 1928, he became the British marathon champion after he won the Amateur Athletic Association's marathon in only his second marathon. His performance of 2:34:34 set on the Polytechnic Marathon course was a new British record. The following month, an injured Payne finished 13th in marathon at the 1928 Summer Olympics in Amsterdam (2:42:29).

At the 1929 AAA Championships, Payne's 2:30:57.6 mark would earn him a second consecutive title and recapture the British marathon record from Sam Ferris – a mark that would stand for 22 years. (Note: The International Association of Athletics Federations does not indicate that Payne's mark was a world best performance; however, it does appear as such in a similar list compiled by the Association of Road Racing Statisticians.)In 2024, this mark was indicated by World Athletics as a world record. With this performance, Payne was ranked first in the marathon for 1929.

He competed in the marathon at the 1930 British Empire Games for England but did not finish the race, largely due to being struck by a car when training for the event several days earlier, injuring his head, knee hip and shoulder.

== Personal life ==
He was a clerk at the time of the 1930 Games and lived in Woodford Green.
