= Raphaël Pujazon =

French athlete

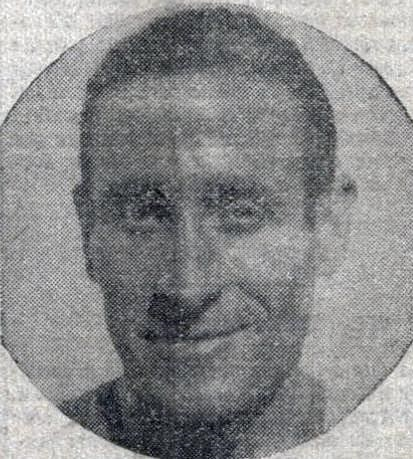
- Raphael Pujazon in 1941

Medal record

Men's athletics

Representing France

European Championships
Gold medal – first place	1946 Oslo	3000 m st.

Raphael Pujazon (12 February 1918 – 22 February 2000) was a French athlete who competed in the 1948 Summer Olympics. He was born in El Campillo, Spain. He won back-to-back titles at the International Cross Country Championships in 1946 to 1947.
