= René Lécuron =

French long-distance runner

Personal information
- Nationality: French
- Born: 26 April 1909
- Died: 23 June 1985 (aged 76)

Sport
- Sport: Long-distance running
- Event: 5000 metres

René Lécuron (26 April 1909 – 23 June 1985) was a French long-distance runner. He competed in the men's 5000 metres at the 1936 Summer Olympics.
