= Ernest Loney =

British middle- and long-distance runner

Personal information
- Nationality: British (English)
- Born: 3 July 1882 Stoke-on-Trent, England
- Died: 27 August 1951 (aged 690) Codsall, England

Sport
- Sport: Athletics
- Event: middle-distance
- Club: Stoke AC; Birchfield Harriers

Ernest Vincent Loney (3 July 1882 – 27 August 1951) was a British athlete who competed at the 1908 Summer Olympics in London.

== Biography ==
Loney was originally a member of Stoke AC before becoming a member of the Birchfield Harriers athletics club.

Loney represented Great Britain at the 1908 Summer Olympics in London. In the fourth round of the 1500 metres, Loney finished first with a time of 4:08.4 to qualify for the final. There, he pace set in an attempt to tire eventual winner Mel Sheppard and did not end up finishing the race.

== Sources ==
- Cook, Theodore Andrea (1908). The Fourth Olympiad, Being the Official Report. London: British Olympic Association.
- De Wael, Herman (2001). "Athletics 1908". Herman's Full Olympians. Archived from the original on 27 September 2006.
- Wudarski, Pawel (1999). "Wyniki Igrzysk Olimpijskich" (in Polish).
- "Index entry". FreeBMD. ONS.
- Ernest Loney at World Athletics
- Ernest Loney at Olympedia
