= Jack Winfield =

English long-distance runner (1907-1991)

Personal information
- Nationality: British (English)
- Born: 27 October 1907 Stanley Common, Derbyshire, England
- Died: January 1991 (aged 83) England

Sport
- Sport: Athletics
- Event: long-distance
- Club: Derby & County Athletic Club
Medal record
Men's Athletics
Representing England
British Empire Games
Bronze medal – third place	1930 Hamilton	3 miles

John William Winfield (27 October 1907 – January 1991) was an English long-distance runner who competed in the 1930 British Empire Games.

== Career ==
Winfield was born in Stanley Common. Shortly before the 1930 British Empire Games in Canada, Winfield became the national 10 miles champion after winning the British AAA Championships title at the 1930 AAA Championships.

At 1930 Empire Games he won the bronze medal in the 3 miles event. In the 6 miles competition he finished seventh. The following year he successfully retained his 10 mile title at the 1931 AAA Championships.

Winfield continued to run at a high level and took up marathon running. He finished third behind Jim Peters in the marathon event at the 1951 AAA Championships. Aged 44 he was shortlisted for the 1952 Olympic Games but was unable to take a place due to finance issues.
