= Anne Oliver =

British Athlete (born 26 December 1935

Isobel Anne Edith Oliver
Personal information
- Born: 26 December 1935
- Height: 1.68 m (5 ft 6 in)
- Weight: 59 kg (130 lb)

Sport
- Sport: Running
- Event: 1500 meters

Anne Oliver (later Chapman) was a British runner who held the world record in the mile in the era before recognition by the international body for the sport of athletics, the IAAF (now World Athletics).

== Career ==
Oliver achieved the women's world record for the mile twice:

- 14 June 1952 with a time of 5:11.0 in London, United Kingdom.
- 12 September 1953 with a time of 5:08.0 in Consett, United Kingdom.

Oliver was also a member of teams that achieved the women's world record for the 3x800 y relay:

- 17 July 1954 with a time of 6:46.0 in London, United Kingdom.

Note 1: The World Athletics (now World Athletics) did not recognise the mile for record purposes by women until 1967 (with the 1500 m).

Note 2: Due to the above, only the mark in the relay is considered ratified world records by World Athletics. The two other marks are considered unratified.

Oliver also won silver twice in the International Cross-Country Championships in 1954 and 1955.

She was also seventh in the 800 m at the 1954 European Athletics Championships representing Great Britain, her more favoured event the 1500 m not being run.
