= Arthur Penny =

English long-distance runner

Personal information
- Nationality: British (English)
- Born: 3 December 1907 England
- Died: 29 November 2003 (aged 85) Kingston Hospital, Kingston upon Thames, England

Sport
- Sport: Athletics
- Event: long-distance
- Club: Belgrave Harriers
Medal record
Men's Athletics
Representing England
British Empire Games
Gold medal – first place	1934 London	6 miles

Arthur William Penny (3 December 1907 – 29 November 2003) was an English athlete who competed in the 1934 British Empire Games and won a gold medal.

== Biography ==
Penny finished second behind Jack Holden in the 6 miles event at the 1934 AAA Championships.

Shortly afterwards, he represented England at the 1934 British Empire Games, where he won a gold medal in the 6 miles race.

Penny finished third behind Reginald Draper in the 10 miles event at the 1938 AAA Championships.
