= Seghir Beddari =

French long-distance runner

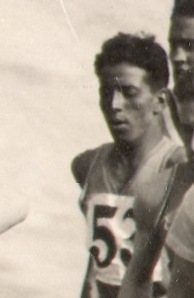

Personal information
- Nationality: French
- Born: 18 July 1901 Constantine, French Algeria

Sport
- Sport: Long-distance running
- Event: 5000 metres

Seghir Beddari (born 18 July 1901, date of death unknown) was a French long-distance runner. He competed in the men's 5000 metres at the 1928 Summer Olympics.
