= William Eaton (athlete) =

British long-distance runner

Personal information
- Full name: William Edward Eaton
- Nationality: British (English)
- Born: 20 April 1909 Salford, England
- Died: 1 April 1938 (aged 28) Salford, England
- Height: 164 cm (5 ft 5 in)
- Weight: 57 kg (126 lb)

Sport
- Sport: Long-distance running
- Event: 10,000 metres
- Club: Salford Harriers

William Edward Eaton (20 April 1909 – 1 April 1938) was a British long-distance runner who competed at the 1936 Summer Olympics.

== Biography ==
Eaton became the national 10 miles champion after winning the British AAA Championships title at the 1936 AAA Championships.

One month later he was selected to represent Great Britain at the 1936 Olympic Games held in Berlin, where he competed in the men's 10,000 metres.

He died of pneumonia less than two years later, aged 28.
