= Ken Norris (athlete) =

British athlete

Personal information
- Nationality: British (English)
- Born: 11 July 1931 (age 95) Hampstead, England
- Height: 171 cm (5 ft 7 in)
- Weight: 57 kg (126 lb)

Sport
- Sport: Athletics
- Event: Long-distance running
- Club: Thames Valley Harriers

Kenneth Leonard Norris (born 11 July 1931) is a British long-distance runner who competed at the 1956 Summer Olympics.

== Biography ==
Norris finished third behind Peter Driver in the 6 miles event at the 1954 AAA Championships.

Norris became the British 6 miles champion after winning the British AAA Championships title at the 1955 AAA Championships and the 1956 AAA Championships.

Later that year in 1956 he represented Great Britain at the 1956 Olympic Games in Melbourne, competing in the men's 10,000 metres.

Norris was one of many signatories in a letter to The Times on 17 July 1958 opposing 'the policy of apartheid' in international sport and defending 'the principle of racial equality which is embodied in the Declaration of the Olympic Games'.

== Sources ==
- Brown, Geoff and Hogsbjerg, Christian. Apartheid is not a Game: Remembering the Stop the Seventy Tour campaign. London: Redwords, 2020. ISBN 9781912926589.
