= John Suttie Smith =

Scottish long-distance runner

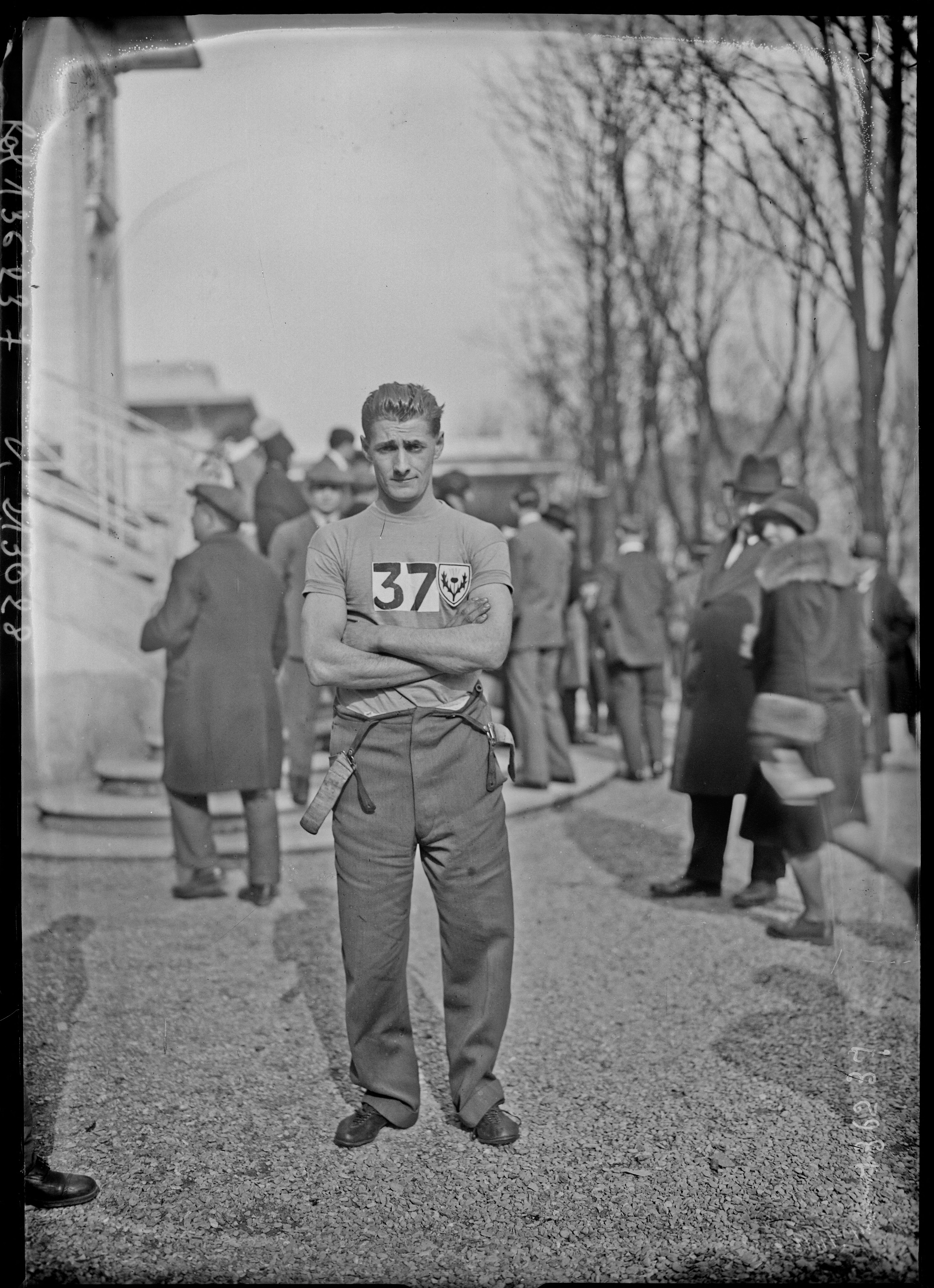

Personal information
- Nationality: British (Scottish)
- Born: 21 June 1905 Dundee, Scotland
- Died: 23 January 1975 (aged 69) Broughty Ferry, Scotland

Sport
- Sport: Long-distance running
- Event: 10,000 metres
- Club: Dundee Thistle Harriers

John Sutherland Suttie Smith (21 June 1905 – 23 January 1975) was a Scottish long-distance runner who competed at the 1928 Summer Olympics.

== Biography ==
Smith competed in the men's 10,000 metres at the 1928 Olympic Games in Amsterdam.

Smith finished third behind Ernie Harper in the 10 miles event at the 1929 AAA Championships.
