= 1960 International Cross Country Championships =

- Organisers: ICCU
- Edition: 47th
- Date: 26 March
- Host city: Hamilton, Lanarkshire, Scotland
- Venue: Hamilton Park
- Events: 1
- Distances: 9 mi (14.5 km)
- Participation: 71 athletes from 8 nations

The 1960 International Cross Country Championships was held in Hamilton, Scotland, at the Hamilton Park on 26 March 1960. A report on the event was given in the Glasgow Herald.

Complete results, medalists, and the results of British athletes were published.

== Medalists ==
Event	Gold		Silver		Bronze	
Individual
Men; 9 mi (14.5 km)	Rhadi Ben Abdesselam; Morocco	43:33	Gaston Roelants; Belgium	43:40	John Merriman; Wales	43:40
Team
Men	England	52	Belgium	61	France	125

== Individual Race Results ==
=== Men's (9 mi / 14.5 km) ===
Rank	Athlete	Nationality	Time
1st place, gold medalist(s)	Rhadi Ben Abdesselam	Morocco	43:33
2nd place, silver medalist(s)	Gaston Roelants	Belgium	43:40
3rd place, bronze medalist(s)	John Merriman	Wales	43:40
4	Basil Heatley	England	44:31
5	Henri Clerckx	Belgium	44:38
6	Fred Norris	England	44:42
7	Alastair Wood	Scotland	44:46
8	Frank Sando	England	44:49
9	Harry Minshall	England	44:53
10	Stanley Eldon	England	44:54
11	Hedwig Leenaert	Belgium	44:56
12	Eugène Allonsius	Belgium	44:59
13	Hamoud Ameur	France	45:01
14	Georges Fromont	Belgium	45:03
15	Gerry North	England	45:04
16	Salah Beddiaf	France	45:09
17	Marcel Vandewattyne	Belgium	45:19
18	Alain Mimoun	France	45:22
19	Francis Duleau	France	45:23
20	David Richards Jun.	Wales	45:24
21	Brian Hill-Cottingham	England	45:26
22	Graham Everett	Scotland	45:27
23	Bruce Tulloh	Scotland	45:28
24	Julius Saenen	Belgium	45:29
25	Abdallah Ould Lamine	Morocco	45:30
26	Mohamed Ben Hassan	Morocco	45:31
27	Paul Genève	France	45:39
28	Carlos Pérez	Spain	45:47
29	John Anderson	England	46:00
30	Bakir Benaissa	Morocco	46:08
31	Bertie Messitt	Ireland	46:10
32	Henri Lucas	France	46:12
33	Alfonso Vidal	Spain	46:14
34	Andy Brown	Scotland	46:15
35	Frans van der Hoeven	Belgium	46:18
36	Luis García	Spain	46:21
37	Abdeslem Bouchta	Morocco	46:22
38	Louis van Praet	Belgium	46:23
39	José Fernández	Spain	46:26
40	Lahcen Benaissa	Morocco	46:32
41	Bert Irving	Scotland	46:35
42	Alan Perkins	England	46:39
43	Mohamed Bensaid	Morocco	46:41
44	Joe Connolly	Scotland	46:47
45	Stan Taylor	Scotland	46:53
46	Willie Dunne	Ireland	46:58
47	Peter Good	Ireland	47:04
48	Tommy Dunne	Ireland	47:05
49	Hamida Addéche	France	47:06
50	Enrique Moreno	Spain	47:11
51	Mohamed Ben Bouchaib	Morocco	47:19
52	Maurice Chiclet	France	47:21
53	Gerald McIntyre	Ireland	47:22
54	Mick Connolly	Ireland	47:23
55	Edward Sinclair	Scotland	47:27
56	Alastair Ross	Scotland	47:33
57	Antonio Amorós	Spain	47:37
58	Jaime Guixa	Spain	47:38
59	Mohamed Ben Mohamed	Morocco	47:42
60	Claude Clement	France	47:47
61	Tony Pumfrey	Wales	47:51
62	Harry Wilson	Wales	47:59
63	Frank White	Ireland	48:05
64	George Dennis	Ireland	48:22
65	John Kelly	Ireland	48:26
66	Bob Roath	Wales	48:44
67	Roger Harrison-Jones	Wales	48:48
68	Brian Jeffs	Wales	48:54
69	Jose Castro Ruibal	Spain	49:37
70	Ken Dare	Wales	50:12
71	Roy Profitt	Wales	51:53

== Team Results ==
=== Men's ===
Rank	Country	Team	Points
1	England	Basil Heatley; Fred Norris; Frank Sando; Harry Minshall; Stanley Eldon; Gerry North	52
2	Belgium	Gaston Roelants; Henri Clerckx; Hedwig Leenaert; Eugène Allonsius; Georges Fromont; Marcel Vandewattyne	61
3	France	Hamoud Ameur; Salah Beddiaf; Alain Mimoun; Francis Duleau; Paul Genève; Henri Lucas	125
4	Morocco	Rhadi Ben Abdesselam; Abdallah Ould Lamine; Mohamed Ben Hassan; Bakir Benaissa; Abdeslem Bouchta; Lahcen Benaissa	159
5	Scotland	Alastair Wood; Graham Everett; Bruce Tulloh; Andy Brown; Bert Irving; Joe Connolly	171
6	Spain	Carlos Pérez; Alfonso Vidal; Luis García; José Fernández; Enrique Moreno; Antonio Amorós	243
7	Ireland	Bertie Messitt; Willie Dunne; Peter Good; Tommy Dunne; Gerald McIntyre; Mick Connolly	279
8	Wales	John Merriman; David Richards Jun. Tony Pumfrey; Harry Wilson; Bob Roath; Roger Harrison-Jones	279

== Participation ==
An unofficial count yields the participation of 71 athletes from 8 countries.

- Belgium (9)
- England (9)
- France (9)
- Ireland (9)
- Morocco (9)
- Scotland (9)
- Spain (8)
- Wales (9)
