= 1959 International Cross Country Championships =

- Organisers: ICCU
- Edition: 46th
- Date: March 21
- Host city: Lisbon, Portugal
- Venue: National Stadium
- Events: 1
- Distances: 9 mi (14.5 km)
- Participation: 78 athletes from 9 nations

The 1959 International Cross Country Championships was held in Lisbon, Portugal, at the National Stadium on March 21, 1959. Morocco entered a team for the first time after gaining independence. A report on the event was given in the Glasgow Herald.

Complete results, medalists, and the results of British athletes were published.

== Medalists ==
Event	Gold		Silver		Bronze	
Individual
Men; 9 mi (14.5 km)	Fred Norris; England	42:44.8	Frank Sando; England	42:52.4	Salah Beddiaf; France	43:01.4
Team
Men	England	40	France	72	Belgium	110

== Individual Race Results ==
=== Men's (9 mi / 14.5 km) ===
Rank	Athlete	Nationality	Time
1st place, gold medalist(s)	Fred Norris	England	42:44.8
2nd place, silver medalist(s)	Frank Sando	England	42:52.4
3rd place, bronze medalist(s)	Salah Beddiaf	France	43:01.4
4	Basil Heatley	England	43:10.4
5	Stanley Eldon	England	43:10.8
6	Alain Mimoun	France	43:15.4
7	Antonio Amoros	Spain	43:18
8	Rhadi Ben Abdesselam	France	43:20.6
9	Marcel Vandewattyne	Belgium	43:25.6
10	Henri Clerckx	Belgium	43:46.8
11	Bakir Benaissa	Morocco	43:50.8
12	Carlos Pérez	Spain	43:53.8
13	Alan Perkins	England	43:57.4
14	Abdallah Ould Lamine	France	44:02.8
15	Michael Maynard	England	44:09.4
16	Luis García	Spain	44:13.8
17	Hamoud Ameur	France	44:17.8
18	Mohamed Saïd	Morocco	44:18.8
19	Aurèle Vandendriessche	Belgium	44:27.4
20	Alastair Wood	Scotland	44:28
21	David Richards Jun.	Wales	44:34.8
22	Denis Jouret	Belgium	44:38.2
23	Hedwig Leenaert	Belgium	44:40.4
24	C. Bouchta	France	44:41.4
25	John Anderson	England	44:41.8
26	Peter Wilkinson	England	44:43.2
27	Gaston Roelants	Belgium	44:45.8
28	Allal Ben Saoudi	Morocco	44:48.6
29	Manuel Faria	Portugal	44:48.8
30	Adrian Jackson	Scotland	44:53
31	Graham Everett	Scotland	45:00.2
32	Hélio Duarte	Portugal	45:00.4
33	John Merriman	Wales	45:11.8
34	Lahcen Benaissa	Morocco	45:17.4
35	Bertie Messitt	Ireland	45:18.4
36	Mohamed Ben Bouchaib	Morocco	45:19
37	Pat Killeen	Ireland	45:26.6
38	Jesús Hurtado	Spain	45:34
39	Richard Morgan	Wales	45:36
40	Michael Bullivant	England	45:45.4
41	José Araújo	Portugal	45:46
42	Manuel Marques	Portugal	45:51
43	Denis O'Gorman	Ireland	45:54
44	Maurits van Laere	Belgium	45:59
45	Mohamed Ben Hassan	Morocco	46:08.4
46	Alfonso Vidal	Spain	46:14.4
47	Joe McGhee	Scotland	46:21.6
48	Manuel Alonso	Spain	46:27.2
49	Norman Horrell	Wales	46:30.8
50	Frank White	Ireland	46:31.4
51	Maurice Chiclet	France	46:32.2
52	Peter Adams	Wales	46:43.6
53	Enrique Moreno	Spain	46:45.6
54	Joaquim Santos	Portugal	46:59
55	Mohamed Ben Mohamed	Morocco	46:58.2
56	Jimmy Todd	Ireland	47:02.4
57	Joe Connolly	Scotland	47:08
58	John McLaren	Scotland	47:10.2
59	Mohamed Bensaid	Morocco	47:20
60	Bert Irving	Scotland	47:31
61	Frans Herman	Belgium	47:37.8
62	Júlio Carmo	Portugal	47:40.2
63	Henrique Inglês	Portugal	48:19.4
64	Roger Harrison-Jones	Wales	48:19.8
65	Roy Profitt	Wales	48:48.4
66	Joaquim Ferreira	Portugal	49:50
67	Jim Kenmore	Ireland	49:52.6
68	William Butcher	Wales	50:32.2
—	Fernando Aguilar	Spain	DNF
—	Tomas Ballestin	Spain	DNF
—	Michel Bernard	France	DNF
—	Willie Dunne	Ireland	DNF
—	Guy Texereau	France	DNF
—	Jim Douglas	Ireland	DNF
—	Natalino Almeida	Portugal	DNF
—	Tommy Dunne	Ireland	DNF
—	Julien Vandevelde	Belgium	DNF
—	Cherif Ahmid	Morocco	DNF

== Team Results ==
=== Men's ===
Rank	Country	Team	Points
1	England	Fred Norris; Frank Sando; Basil Heatley; Stanley Eldon; Alan Perkins; Michael Maynard	40
2	France	Salah Beddiaf; Alain Mimoun; Rhadi Ben Abdesselam; Abdallah Ould Lamine; Hamoud Ameur; C. Bouchta	72
3	Belgium	Marcel Vandewattyne; Henri Clerckx; Aurèle Vandendriessche; Denis Jouret; Hedwig Leenaert; Gaston Roelants	110
4	Spain	Antonio Amoros; Carlos Pérez; Luis García; Jesús Hurtado; Alfonso Vidal; Manuel Alonso	167
5	Morocco	Bakir Benaissa; Mohamed Saïd; Allal Ben Saoudi; Lahcen Benaissa; Mohamed Ben Bouchaib; Mohamed Ben Hassan	172
6	Scotland	Alastair Wood; Adrian Jackson; Graham Everett; Joe McGhee; Joe Connolly; John McLaren	243
7	Wales	David Richards Jun. John Merriman; Richard Morgan; Norman Horrell; Peter Adams; Roger Harrison-Jones	258
8	Portugal	Manuel Faria; Hélio Duarte; José Araújo; Manuel Marques; Joaquim Santos; Júlio Carmo	260
9	Ireland	Bertie Messitt; Pat Killeen; Denis O'Gorman; Frank White; Jimmy Todd; Jim Kenmore	288

== Participation ==
An unofficial count yields the participation of 78 athletes from 9 countries.

- Belgium (9)
- England (9)
- France (9)
- Ireland (9)
- Morocco (9)
- Portugal (9)
- Scotland (7)
- Spain (9)
- Wales (8)
