= 1958 International Cross Country Championships =

- Organisers: ICCU
- Edition: 45th
- Date: 22 March
- Host city: Cardiff, Glamorgan, Wales
- Venue: Pontcanna Fields
- Events: 1
- Distances: 9 mi (14.5 km)
- Participation: 78 athletes from 9 nations

The 1958 International Cross Country Championships was held in Cardiff, Wales, at the Pontcanna Fields on 22 March 1958. Tunisia entered a team for the first time after gaining independence. A report on the event was given in the Glasgow Herald.

Complete results, medalists, and the results of British athletes were published.

== Medalists ==
| Event | Gold | | Silver | | Bronze | |
|---|---|---|---|---|---|---|
Individual
| Men; 9 mi (14.5 km) | Stanley Eldon; England | 46:29 | Alain Mimoun; France | 46:30 | Frank Sando; England | 46:33 |
Team
| Men | England | 35 | France | 64 | Belgium | 166 |

== Individual Race Results ==
=== Men's (9 mi / 14.5 km) ===
| Rank | Athlete | Nationality | Time |
|---|---|---|---|
| 1st place, gold medalist(s) | Stanley Eldon | England | 46:29 |
| 2nd place, silver medalist(s) | Alain Mimoun | France | 46:30 |
| 3rd place, bronze medalist(s) | Frank Sando | England | 46:33 |
| 4 | Alan Perkins | England | 46:38 |
| 5 | Willie Dunne | Ireland | 46:43 |
| 6 | Michel Bernard | France | 46:48 |
| 7 | John Merriman | Wales | 46:57 |
| 8 | Fred Norris | England | 47:07 |
| 9 | Basil Heatley | England | 47:12 |
| 10 | Alan Cocking | England | 47:15 |
| 11 | Maurice Chiclet | France | 47:19 |
| 12 | Francis Duleau | France | 47:21 |
| 13 | Marcel Vandewattyne | Belgium | 47:26 |
| 14 | Ahmed Messafta | Tunisia | 47:28 |
| 15 | Rhadi Ben Abdesselam | France | 47:43 |
| 16 | Hélio Duarte | Portugal | 47:48 |
| 17 | David Richards Jun. | Wales | 48:04 |
| 18 | Salah Beddiaf | France | 48:09 |
| 19 | Bertie Messitt | Ireland | 48:10 |
| 20 | Robert Bogey | France | 48:12 |
| 21 | Frans Herman | Belgium | 48:13 |
| 22 | Norman Horrell | Wales | 48:14 |
| 23 | Hamoud Ameur | France | 48:16 |
| 24 | Manuel Faria | Portugal | 48:17 |
| 25 | John Russell | Scotland | 48:18 |
| 26 | Paul Genève | France | 48:23 |
| 27 | Michael Firth | England | 48:30 |
| 28 | Luis García | Spain | 48:32 |
| 29 | Frans van der Hoeven | Belgium | 48:34 |
| 30 | António Ventura | Portugal | 48:36 |
| 31 | Willy Putzeys | Belgium | 48:42 |
| 32 | Aurèle Vandendriessche | Belgium | 48:44 |
| 33 | Antonio Amoros | Spain | 48:46 |
| 34 | Joe Connolly | Scotland | 48:49 |
| 35 | Kenneth Caulder | England | 48:57 |
| 36 | Abdelmalek El Ouni | Tunisia | 49:00 |
| 37 | Pat Moy | Scotland | 49:04 |
| 38 | Joaquim Santos | Portugal | 49:08 |
| 39 | Labidi Ayachi | Tunisia | 49:10 |
| 40 | Frans Scheers | Belgium | 49:16 |
| 41 | Joaquim Ferreira | Portugal | 49:19 |
| 42 | Harry Fenion | Scotland | 49:22 |
| 43 | Mariano Martin | Spain | 49:24 |
| 44 | Raymond van den Borre | Belgium | 49:27 |
| 45 | Jean van Onselen | Belgium | 49:33 |
| 46 | Adrian Jackson | Scotland | 49:34 |
| 47 | Tommy Dunne | Ireland | 49:35 |
| 48 | José Fernández | Spain | 49:37 |
| 49 | Jim Douglas | Ireland | 49:40 |
| 50 | Andrew Fleming | Scotland | 49:49 |
| 51 | Jose Castro Ruibal | Spain | 50:02 |
| 52 | Maurits van Laere | Belgium | 50:09 |
| 53 | Miguel Navarro | Spain | 50:11 |
| 54 | Andy Brown | Scotland | 50:14 |
| 55 | Armando Aldegalega | Portugal | 50:25 |
| 56 | Des Dickson | Scotland | 50:26 |
| 57 | Luis Vargas | Spain | 50:27 |
| 58 | Adam Brown | Ireland | 50:29 |
| 59 | Harry Wilson | Wales | 50:33 |
| 60 | Amor Manai | Tunisia | 50:35 |
| 61 | Rhys Davies | Wales | 50:39 |
| 62 | J.I. Evans | Wales | 50:41 |
| 63 | Davy Harrison | Ireland | 50:56 |
| 64 | Augusto Silva | Portugal | 51:09 |
| 65 | Sean O'Sullivan | Ireland | 51:21 |
| 66 | Rachid Ben Naceur | Tunisia | 51:27 |
| 67 | Peter Bowden | Wales | 51:37 |
| 68 | John McLaren | Scotland | 51:39 |
| 69 | Michael Maynard | England | 51:39 |
| 70 | Abdessalem Dargouth | Tunisia | 51:49 |
| 71 | Frazer Walker | Ireland | 51:55 |
| 72 | Barrie Saunders | Wales | 52:00 |
| 73 | Joaquin Escudero | Spain | 52:11 |
| 74 | Ali Tarbag | Tunisia | 52:23 |
| 75 | Abdelbaki Ben Ali | Tunisia | 53:00 |
| 76 | Haydn Tawton | Wales | 53:25 |
| 77 | Bob McCullough | Ireland | 53:35 |
| — | Hassan Amri | Tunisia | DNF |

== Team Results ==
=== Men's ===
| Rank | Country | Team | Points |
|---|---|---|---|
| 1 | England | Stanley Eldon; Frank Sando; Alan Perkins; Fred Norris; Basil Heatley; Alan Cocking | 35 |
| 2 | France | Alain Mimoun; Michel Bernard; Maurice Chiclet; Francis Duleau; Rhadi Ben Abdesselam; Salah Beddiaf | 64 |
| 3 | Belgium | Marcel Vandewattyne; Frans Herman; Frans van der Hoeven; Willy Putzeys; Aurèle Vandendriessche; Frans Scheers | 166 |
| 4 | Portugal | Hélio Duarte; Manuel Faria; António Ventura; Joaquim Santos; Joaquim Ferreira; Armando Aldegalega | 204 |
| 5 | Wales | John Merriman; David Richards Jun. Norman Horrell; Harry Wilson; Rhys Davies; J.I. Evans | 228 |
| 6 | Scotland | John Russell; Joe Connolly; Pat Moy; Harry Fenion; Adrian Jackson; Andrew Fleming | 234 |
| 7 | Ireland | Willie Dunne; Bertie Messitt; Tommy Dunne; Jim Douglas; Adam Brown; Davy Harrison | 241 |
| 8 | Spain | Luis García; Antonio Amoros; Mariano Martin; José Fernández; Jose Castro Ruibal; Miguel Navarro | 256 |
| 9 | Tunisia | Ahmed Messafta; Abdelmalek El Ouni; Labidi Ayachi; Amor Manai; Rachid Ben Naceur; Abdessalem Dargouth | 285 |

== Participation ==
An unofficial count yields the participation of 78 athletes from 9 countries.

- Belgium (9)
- England (9)
- France (9)
- Ireland (9)
- Portugal (7)
- Scotland (9)
- Spain (8)
- Tunisia (9)
- Wales (9)
