= 1957 International Cross Country Championships =

- Organisers: ICCU
- Edition: 44th
- Date: 23 March (men); 30 March (women)
- Host city: Waregem, West Flanders, Belgium (men); Musselburgh, East Lothian, Scotland (women)
- Venue: Hippodroom Waregem
- Events: 1 / 1
- Distances: 9 mi (14.5 km) (men) / 1.9 mi (3.0 km) (women)
- Participation: 89 (men) / 12 (women) athletes from 10 (men) / 2 (women) nations

The 1957 International Cross Country Championships were held in Waregem, Belgium, at the Hippodroom Waregem on 23 March 1957. In addition, an unofficial women's championship was held one week later at Musselburgh, Scotland, on 30 March 1957. A report on the men's event and the women's event was given in the Glasgow Herald.

Complete results for men, and for women (unofficial), medalists, and the results of British athletes were published.

== Medalists ==
Event	Gold		Silver		Bronze	
Individual
Men; 9 mi (14.5 km)	Frank Sando; England	45:58	Basil Heatley; England	46:09	Ken Norris; England	46:18
Women (unofficial); 1.9 mi (3.0 km)	Diane Leather; England	11:15	Roma Ashby; England	11:21	June Bridgland; England	11:45
Team
Men	Belgium	67	France	80	England	84
Women (unofficial)	England	10	Scotland	34		

== Individual Race Results ==
=== Men's (9 mi / 14.5 km) ===
Rank	Athlete	Nationality	Time
1st place, gold medalist(s)	Frank Sando	England	45:58
2nd place, silver medalist(s)	Basil Heatley	England	46:09
3rd place, bronze medalist(s)	Ken Norris	England	46:18
4	Denis Jouret	Belgium	46:19
5	Albert Chorlton	England	46:29
6	Maurice Chiclet	France	46:33
7	Marcel Vandewattyne	Belgium	46:47
8	Maurits van Laere	Belgium	46:49
9	Paul Genève	France	46:50
10	Antonio Amoros	Spain	46:53
11	Frans Herman	Belgium	46:56
12	Manuel Faria	Portugal	46:57
13	Aurèle Vandendriessche	Belgium	47:00
14	Abdallah Ould Lamine	France	47:13
15	Bakir Benaissa	France	47:15
16	Luis García	Spain	47:19
17	Salah Beddiaf	France	47:20
18	António Ventura	Portugal	47:25
19	René Aberlenc	France	47:27
20	Said Benmaguini	France	47:29
21	Frans Künen	Netherlands	47:33
22	Robert Bogey	France	47:39
23	Jim Douglas	Ireland	47:40
24	Paul Huylebroeck	Belgium	47:40
25	Henk Viset	Netherlands	47:47
26	Raymond van den Borre	Belgium	47:57
27	Francis Duleau	France	47:59
28	Pat Moy	Scotland	48:02
29	Hein Cujé	Netherlands	48:03
30	Felix Sherry	Ireland	48:04
31	Tommy Dunne	Ireland	48:09
32	Jan Keesom	Netherlands	48:15
33	Bertie Messitt	Ireland	48:24
34	Alan Perkins	England	48:25
35	John McLaren	Scotland	48:25
36	Frans van der Hoeven	Belgium	48:27
37	Eddie Bannon	Scotland	48:36
38	John Russell	Scotland	48:39
39	David Humphreys	England	48:41
40	Richard Morgan	Wales	48:43
41	Joaquin Escudero	Spain	48:46
42	Hélio Duarte	Portugal	48:47
43	Jesús Hurtado	Spain	48:48
44	Joaquim Santos	Portugal	48:52
45	José Araújo	Portugal	48:53
46	Yves Jeannotat	Switzerland	48:59
47	Don Appleby	Ireland	49:15
48	Joep Delnoye	Netherlands	49:17
49	Alfonso Vidal	Spain	49:20
50	Augusto Silva	Portugal	49:23
51	Harry Fenion	Scotland	49:25
52	Michael Firth	England	49:27
53	Alexander McDougall	Scotland	49:34
54	Lucas Larraza	Spain	49:35
55	Davy Harrison	Ireland	49:38
56	Josef Suter	Switzerland	49:40
57	Paul Verra	Netherlands	49:44
58	Jim McCormack	Scotland	49:50
59	Filipe Luis	Portugal	49:52
60	Peter Driver	England	49:55
61	Pierre de Pauw	Belgium	50:08
62	Anton Jonkers	Netherlands	50:09
63	Luis Vargas	Spain	50:15
64	Joe Connolly	Scotland	50:16
65	August Sutter	Switzerland	50:17
66	Norman Horrell	Wales	50:26
67	Willy Dodds	Ireland	50:30
68	José Molíns	Spain	50:34
69	Serge De Quay	Switzerland	50:36
70	Dyfrigg Rees	Wales	50:46
71	Tony Pumfrey	Wales	50:48
72	Tavares de Jesus	Portugal	50:49
73	Jack Wingfield	Wales	50:58
74	Rhys Davies	Wales	51:04
75	Sergio Bueno	Spain	51:14
76	Billy McCue	Ireland	51:15
77	Bobby Calderwood	Scotland	51:25
78	Josef Sidler	Switzerland	51:30
79	William Butcher	Wales	51:50
80	Arie Verbaan	Netherlands	51:50
81	Georg Steiner	Switzerland	51:52
82	Rudolf Morgenthaler	Switzerland	51:53
83	Tom Wood	Wales	52:12
84	Brian James	Wales	52:52
85	Ian Hagan	Ireland	53:03
86	Willy Weert	Netherlands	53:27
87	Jules Zehnder	Switzerland	54:21
88	Anton Schriber	Switzerland	55:12
—	Hugh Foord	England	DNF

=== Women's (1.9 mi / 3.0 km, unofficial) ===
Rank	Athlete	Nationality	Time
1st place, gold medalist(s)	Diane Leather	England	11:15
2nd place, silver medalist(s)	Roma Ashby	England	11:21
3rd place, bronze medalist(s)	June Bridgland	England	11:45
4	Anne Oliver	England	11:53
5	Maureen Bonnano	England	11:54
6	Phyllis Perkins	England	12:05
7	Doreen Fulton	Scotland	13:10
8	Betty Rodger	Scotland	13:26
9	Morag O'Hare	Scotland	13:27
10	Helen Cherry	Scotland	13:52
11	Dale Greig	Scotland	14:02
12	Mary Campbell	Scotland	14:15

== Team Results ==
=== Men's ===
Rank	Country	Team	Points
1	Belgium	Denis Jouret; Marcel Vandewattyne; Maurits van Laere; Frans Herman; Aurèle Vandendriessche; Paul Huylebroeck	67
2	France	Maurice Chiclet; Paul Genève; Abdallah Ould Lamine; Bakir Benaissa; Salah Beddiaf; René Aberlenc	80
3	England	Frank Sando; Basil Heatley; Ken Norris; Albert Chorlton; Alan Perkins; David Humphreys	84
4	Portugal	Manuel Faria; António Ventura; Hélio Duarte; Joaquim Santos; José Araújo; Augusto Silva	211
5	Netherlands	Frans Künen; Henk Viset; Hein Cujé; Jan Keesom; Joep Delnoye; Paul Verra	212
6	Spain	Antonio Amoros; Luis García; Joaquin Escudero; Jesús Hurtado; Alfonso Vidal; Lucas Larraza	213
7	Ireland	Jim Douglas; Felix Sherry; Tommy Dunne; Bertie Messitt; Don Appleby; Davy Harrison	219
8	Scotland	Pat Moy; John McLaren; Eddie Bannon; John Russell; Harry Fenion; Alexander McDougall	242
9	Wales	Richard Morgan; Norman Horrell; Dyfrigg Rees; Tony Pumfrey; Jack Wingfield; Rhys Davies	394
10	Switzerland	Yves Jeannotat; Josef Suter; August Sutter; Serge De Quay; Josef Sidler; Georg Steiner	395

=== Women's (unofficial) ===
Rank	Country	Team	Points
1	England	Diane Leather; Roma Ashby; June Bridgland; Anne Oliver	10
2	Scotland	Doreen Fulton; Betty Rodger; Morag O'Hare; Helen Cherry	34

== Participation ==
=== Men's ===
An unofficial count yields the participation of 89 male athletes from 10 countries.

- Belgium (9)
- England (9)
- France (9)
- Ireland (9)
- Netherlands (9)
- Portugal (8)
- Scotland (9)
- Spain (9)
- Switzerland (9)
- Wales (9)

=== Women's ===
An unofficial count yields the participation of 12 female athletes from 2 countries.

- England (6)
- Scotland (6)
