= World Military Cross Country Championships =

Sporting competition

The World Military Cross Country Championships is an international biennial cross country running competition organised by the International Military Sports Council (CISM). The competition is typically held in late February or early March. First held in 1947, it was typically held on an annually basis, but since 2004 it has been held roughly every two years.

The championships has three races: the men's long race (roughly 12 km (7.5 mi)), the men's short race (roughly 5 km (3.1 mi)), and the women's race (roughly 5 km (3.1 mi)). The competition attracts elite level long-distance runners who are members of their national military, with past winners including two-time world champion Saif Saaeed Shaheen, the 2008 Olympic champion Nancy Jebet Langat, and New York Marathon winner Jeļena Prokopčuka.

== Past winners ==
=== Men ===
| Edition | Year | Men's long race | | Men's short race | |
| Edition | Year | Individual | Team | Individual | Team |
|---|---|---|---|---|---|
| 1st | 1947 | Emil Zátopek (TCH) | ? | ? | ? |
| 2nd | 1949 | Ould Lamine Abdallah (FRA) | ? | ? | ? |
| 3rd | 1950 | Jaber (FRA) | ? | ? | ? |
| 4th | 1951 | Gordon Pirie (GBR) | ? | ? | ? |
| 5th | 1953 | Ould Lamine Abdallah (FRA) | ? | ? | ? |
| 6th | 1955 | Ould Lamine Abdallah (FRA) | ? | ? | ? |
| 7th | 1956 | Ould Lamine Abdallah (FRA) | ? | ? | ? |
| 8th | 1958 | Tor Torgersen (NOR) | ? | ? | ? |
| 9th | 1959 | Henri Clerckx (BEL) | ? | ? | ? |
| 10th | 1960 | Rhadi Ben Abdesselam (FRA) | ? | ? | ? |
| 11th | 1961 | Henri Clerckx (BEL) | ? | ? | ? |
| 12th | 1962 | Henri Clerckx (BEL) | ? | ? | ? |
| 13th | 1963 | Eugene Allonsius (BEL) | ? | ? | ? |
| 14th | 1964 | Abdeslem Bouchta (MAR) | ? | ? | ? |
| 15th | 1965 | Mohammed Gammoudi (TUN) | ? | ? | ? |
| 16th | 1966 | Ben Assou El Ghazi (MAR) | ? | ? | ? |
| 17th | 1967 | Mohammed Gammoudi (TUN) | ? | Eddy Van Butsele (BEL) | ? |
| 18th | 1968 | Mohammed Gammoudi (TUN) | ? | ? | ? |
| 19th | 1969 | Moha Aït Bassou (MAR) | ? | ? | ? |
| 20th | 1970 | Abdelkader Zaddem (TUN) | Morocco | Christian Dudouet (FRA) | France |
| 21st | 1971 | Jaddour Haddou (MAR) | Morocco | Edgard Salvé (BEL) | Belgium |
| 22nd | 1972 | Jaddour Haddou (MAR) | Morocco | Mansour Guettaya (TUN) | Tunisia |
| 23rd | 1973 | Osmany (MAR) | Morocco | Edgard Salvé (BEL) | Turkey |
| 24th | 1974 | Franco Fava (ITA) | Morocco | Detlef Uhlemann (FRG) | Germany |
| 25th | 1975 | Jaddour Haddou (MAR) | Morocco | Franco Fava (ITA) | Germany |
| 26th | 1976 | Franco Fava (ITA) | Morocco | Venanzio Ortis (ITA) | Belgium |
| 27th | 1978 | Mohamed Zaidi (TUN) | Tunisia | Léon Schots (BEL) | Belgium |
| 28th | 1979 | Mohamed Zaidi (TUN) | Algeria | Léon Schots (BEL) | Belgium |
| 29th | 1980 | El Hachemi Abdenouz (ALG) | Morocco | Léon Schots (BEL) | Belgium |
| 30th | 1981 | Ahmed Musa Jouda (SUD) | Algeria | Philippe Leclair (FRA) | Belgium |
| 31st | 1982 | Ahmed Musa Jouda (SUD) | Algeria | João Campos (POR) | Portugal |
| 32nd | 1983 | Abu Moussad (SUD) | Algeria | Hussein Ahmed Salah (DJI) | Algeria |
| 33rd | 1984 | Abderrazak Gtari (TUN) | Algeria | Uwe Mönkemeyer (FRG) | Algeria |
| 34th | 1985 | Hussein Ahmed Salah (DJI) | Belgium | Robert Nemeth (AUT) | Italy |
| 35th | 1986 | Hussein Ahmed Salah (DJI) | Morocco | Luciano Carchesio (ITA) | Algeria |
| 36th | 1987 | Salem Majdoubi (MAR) | Morocco | Luciano Carchesio (ITA) | Italy |
| 37th | 1988 | Vincent Rousseau (BEL) | Morocco | Giuseppe Miccoli (ITA) | France |
| 38th | 1989 | Hammou Boutayeb (MAR) | Morocco | Antonio Martins (FRA) | Italy |
| 39th | 1990 | Hammou Boutayeb (MAR) | Morocco | Alberto Maravilha (POR) | Morocco |
| 40th | 1992 | Boay Akonay (TAN) | Tanzania | João Junqueira (POR) | Portugal |
| 41st | 1993 | Vincent Rousseau (BEL) | Burundi | Anthony Mwingereza (TAN) | Portugal |
| 42nd | 1994 | Vincent Rousseau (BEL) | Tunisia | Antonio Martins (FRA) | Portugal |
| 43rd | 1995 | Aloÿs Nizigama (BDI) | Burundi | Gianni Crepaldi (ITA) | Italy |
| 44th | 1996 | Mustapha Bamouh (MAR) | Morocco | Alyan Sultan Al-Qahtani (KSA) | Italy |
| 45th | 1997 | Mustapha Bamouh (MAR) | Italy | Hicham Bouaouiche (MAR) | Morocco |
| 46th | 1998 | Róbert Štefko (SVK) | Morocco | Hicham Bouaouiche (MAR) | Portugal |
| 47th | 1999 | Mustapha Bamouh (MAR) | Morocco | Driss El Himer (FRA) | Portugal |
| 48th | 2000 | Mustapha Bamouh (MAR) | Morocco | Driss El Himer (FRA) | Italy |
| 49th | 2002 | Noureddine Moufti (MAR) | Morocco | Abdelkader Hachlaf (MAR) | Morocco |
| 50th | 2003 | Dieudonné Disi (RWA) | Italy | Mohammed Abdelhak Zakaria (BHR) | Morocco |
| 51st | 2004 | Moustafa Ahmed Shebto (QAT) | Qatar | Saif Saaeed Shaheen (QAT) | Qatar |
| 52nd | 2006 | Gamal Belal Salem (QAT) | Qatar | Tareq Mubarak Taher (QAT) | Qatar |
| 53rd | 2008 | Ahmad Hassan Abdullah (QAT) | Qatar | Thamer Kamal Ali (QAT) | Qatar |
| 54th | 2010 | Josphat Kiprono Menjo (KEN) | Kenia | Andrea Lalli (ITA) | Algeria |
| 55th | 2013 | Zelalem Regasa (BHR) | Bahrain | Alemu Bekele (BHR) | Poland |
| 56th | 2014 | Abdennacer Fathi (MAR) | | Raba Aboud (ALG) | |
| 57th | 2017 | Ali Guerine (ALG) | Algeria | Djilali Bedrani (FRA) | Algeria |

=== Women ===
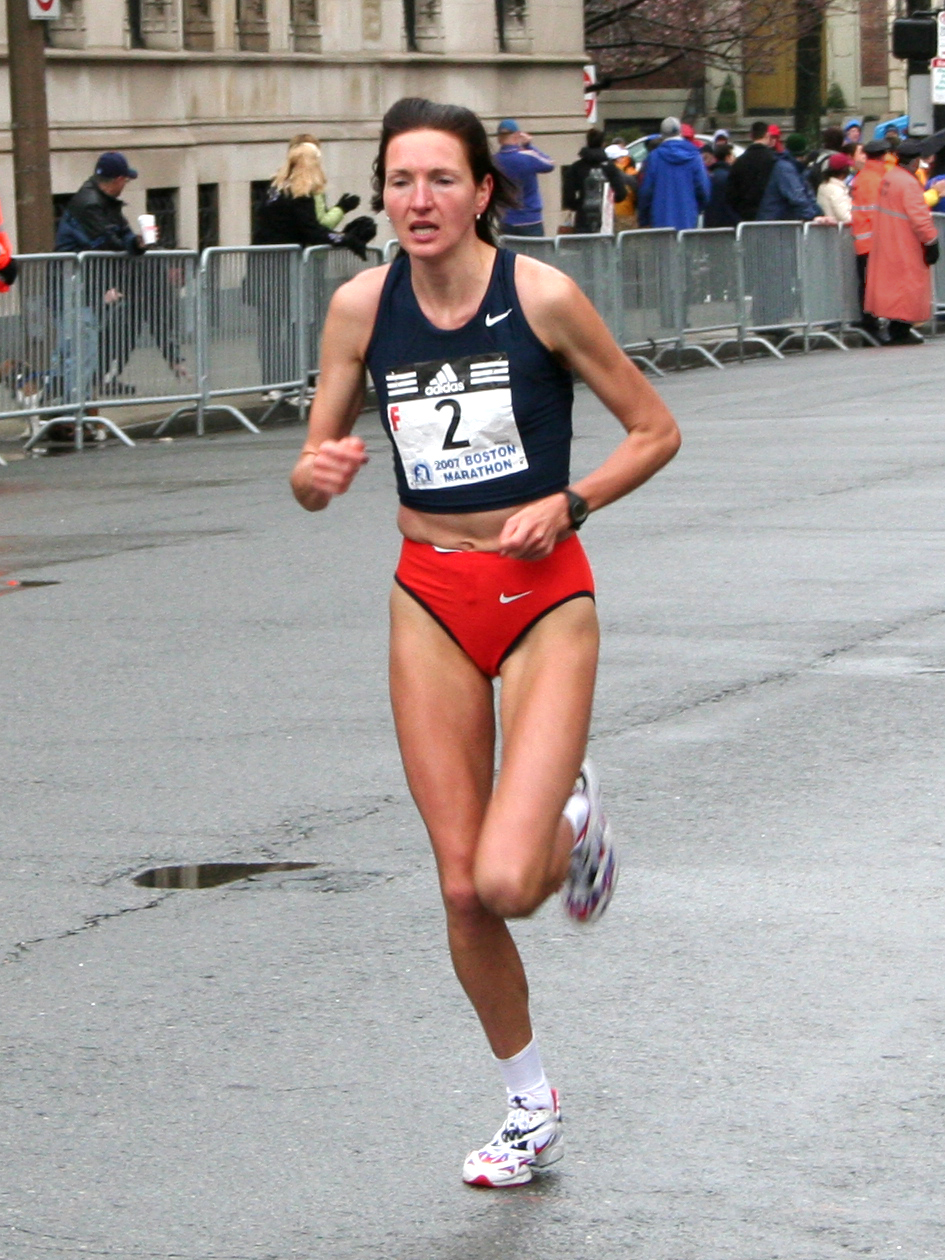
Marathon runner Jeļena Prokopčuka won in 2003.

| Edition | Year | Individual | Team |
|---|---|---|---|
| 30th | 1980 | Bernadette Buysse (BEL) | ? |
| 31st | 1981 | Bernadette Buysse (BEL) | ? |
| 32nd | 1982 | Anderson (USA) | ? |
| 33rd | 1983 | Weber (USA) | ? |
| 34th | 1984 | Linda Milo (BEL) | ? |
| 35th | 1985 | Linda Milo (BEL) | ? |
| 36th | 1986 | Hassania Darami (MAR) | ? |
| 37th | 1987 | Debruycher (FRA) | ? |
| 38th | 1988 | Fatima Maama (FRA) | ? |
| 39th | 1989 | Corinne Debaets (BEL) | ? |
| 40th | 1990 | Corinne Debaets (BEL) | ? |
| 41st | 1992 | Corinne Debaets (BEL) | ? |
| 42nd | 1993 | Anja Smolders (BEL) | ? |
| 43rd | 1994 | Anja Smolders (BEL) | ? |
| 44th | 1995 | Tullia Orietta Mancia (ITA) | ? |
| 45th | 1996 | Anja Smolders (BEL) | ? |
| 46th | 1997 | Nadia Dandolo (ITA) | ? |
| 47th | 1998 | Zhor El Kamch (MAR) | ? |
| th | 1999 | Zhor El Kamch (MAR) | ? |
| 48th | 2000 | Zhor El Kamch (MAR) | ? |
| 49th | 2002 | Zhor El Kamch (MAR) | Morocco |
| 50th | 2003 | Jeļena Prokopčuka (LAT) | Germany |
| 51st | 2004 | Zhor El Kamch (MAR) | Morocco |
| 52nd | 2006 | Zhor El Kamch (MAR) | France |
| 53rd | 2008 | Sabrina Mockenhaupt (GER) | Morocco |
| 54th | 2010 | Nancy Jebet Langat (KEN) | Kenya |
| 55th | 2013 | Shitaye Eshete (BHR) | Bahrain |
| 56th | 2014 | Iwona Lewandowska (POL) | |
| 57th | 2017 | Bîrcă Roxana (ROU) | France |

== See also ==
- World Military Track & Field Championships
