= Athletics at the 1958 British Empire and Commonwealth Games – Men's 6 miles =

Men's 6 miles at the Commonwealth Games

The men's 6 miles event at the 1958 British Empire and Commonwealth Games was held on 19 July at the Cardiff Arms Park in Cardiff, Wales.

== Results ==
Rank	Name	Nationality	Time	Notes
1st place, gold medalist(s)	Dave Power	Australia	28:48.16	
2nd place, silver medalist(s)	John Merriman	Wales	28:48.84	
3rd place, bronze medalist(s)	Arere Anentia	Kenya	28:51.48	
4	Martin Hyman	England	28:58.6	
5	Frederick Norris	England	29:44.0	
6	Arap Sum Kanuti	Kenya	30:03.6	
7	Joe Connolly	Scotland	30:20.4	
8	Arthur Magee	New Zealand	30:27.2	
9	Stanley Eldon	England	30:30.0	
10	Mubarak Shah	Pakistan	31:03.2	
11	Hugh Foord	England	31:03.2	
12	Raymond Puckett	New Zealand	31:57.2	
13	George De Peana	British Guiana	32:00.0	
	Alastair Wood	Scotland	DNF	
	David John Dodds	Southern Rhodesia	DNF	
	Albie Thomas	Australia	DNS	
	Gordon Dickson	Canada	DNS	
	Walter Dass	British Guiana	DNS	
	Sew Etwaroo	British Guiana	DNS	
	Chepsiror Chepkwony	Kenya	DNS	
	David Richards	Wales	DNS	
