= Basil Heatley =

British long-distance runner (1933–2019)

Personal information
- Born: 25 December 1933 Kenilworth, Warwickshire, England
- Died: 3 August 2019 (aged 85) Worcester, England
- Height: 1.73 m (5 ft 8 in)
- Weight: 66 kg (146 lb)

Sport
- Sport: Long-distance running
- Club: Coventry Godiva Harriers
Medal record
Representing Great Britain
Olympic Games
Silver medal – second place	1964 Tokyo	Marathon

Benjamin Basil Heatley (25 December 1933 – 3 August 2019) was a British competitive long-distance runner, who was an Olympic marathon silver medallist and former world marathon record-holder. Although he favoured cross country running, he was also a skilled marathon runner and, despite running shoe technology being in its infancy, he was able to adapt easily to the change of conditions underfoot.

Heatley was a three-time winner of the English National Cross Country title (1960, 1961, 1963). He competed in the International Cross Country Championships seven times between 1957 and 1964, winning the world title in 1961. In the early 1960s, he set a British record and a world record for the 10-mile run, then on 13 June 1964 he broke the record for the world's fastest marathon. Four months later, he won a silver medal for Great Britain at the 1964 Tokyo Olympics when he finished second in the Olympic marathon (defending champion Abebe Bikila broke Heatley's world record on winning his second gold medal). The 1964 Olympics marked the end of Heatley's international career.

== Biography ==
=== Early life ===
Heatley grew up on a farm near Coventry, Warwickshire (now West Midlands), England. He developed an interest in running in his early teens. He started reading athletics magazines and bought a copy of "Athletics and Training", a book written by British Olympic athlete Guy Butler. As a 14-year-old boy, he read about the 1948 Summer Olympics that were taking place in London, and was inspired by Czechoslovak long-distance runner Emil Zátopek whose performance made a lasting impression on him.

He attended grammar school, where he discovered his natural ability for cross country running and soon started to take the sport seriously. He trained on the driveway of the family farm and got extra conditioning from his early years of farm work and cycling eight miles to school and back every day.

Heatley's National Service was deferred because he was working in the farming industry (an "essential service" that allowed a period of exemption), but he eventually signed up in October 1954 at the age of twenty. He served in the Royal Army Veterinary Corps, working with horses and dogs, and came out of the army as a corporal. His training and fitness declined while he was in the military and it had a detrimental effect on his running.

=== Cross country running career ===
Heatley joined Coventry Godiva Harriers at the end of 1950 and was to become a life member of the club. He won the Midland Cross Country Youth title in 1951, and finished third in the English National Youth Cross Country Championship. He won another bronze medal in the National Juniors cross country race in 1952. During the 1953/54 season, he took part in cross country races at the Junior level in the Birmingham League, winning their first division race at least eight times. He then won the Midland Cross Country Junior title in both 1954 and 1955, and the Midland Cross Country Senior title five times (1957–1960 and 1964).

He first started marathon running in 1956 and won the Midlands Championships the same year, completing the distance in 2:36:55. He successfully defended his title at the 1957 Midlands Championships, improving on his previous time with 2:23:01. He then decided to take a break from marathon running, preferring to concentrate on his cross country career, and he would not revisit the marathon until a number of years later.

Heatley was one of the top scorers for the England Cross Country team between 1957 and 1964, competing every year at the English National Cross Country Championships. After finishing 5th in his first attempt at the Seniors level in 1957 at Peterborough, he eventually won the national title for the first time in 1960 at West Bromwich. He successfully defended his title the following year at Parliament Hill Fields, and completed his national hat-trick in 1963 with his third win at Cambridge. He finished in the top ten at the National Cross on six other occasions, only once finishing in the low teens (at Blackpool in 1962) due to an injury that had been affecting his form over that particular season. He also represented Warwickshire at the Inter Counties Cross Country Championships during this period, winning the title in 1959 and taking second place in 1960.

He was a seven-time participant in the International Cross Country Championships (forerunner of the IAAF World Cross Country Championships). At his first attempt in the 1957 International Cross in Belgium, he came runner-up in the 9-mile run to teammate Frank Sando. He finished 9th in 1958, and took 4th place in both 1959 and 1960. Heatley finally became cross country world champion at the 1961 International Cross in Nantes, France, winning with an impressive margin of 23 seconds.

Heatley became the British 10 miles champion after winning the British AAA Championships title at the 1960 AAA Championships.

On 15 April 1961, at the 1961 AAA Championships at Hurlingham Park in London, he broke his hero Zátopek's world record for the 10-mile run, with a time of 47 minutes and 47 seconds. A versatile runner over various distances, he was also a regular performer in the 6-mile run and the 10,000 metres.

=== Marathon world record ===
In 1962, having taken an extended break from marathon running, Heatley came to the conclusion that his best hope of winning an Olympic medal before his retirement was to focus his efforts on the marathon event at the 1964 Tokyo Olympics. He confessed that he was not keen on the marathon, saying it was "just a bit too far" for him; he preferred the shorter distances, particularly the 10-mile run.

His first outing was at the 1963 AAA Championships marathon in Coventry, which he used as a dummy run to test his potential, but he finished the race in second place to clubmate Brian Kilby with a time of 2:19:56. In October of the same year, encouraged by his success in the AAA, he took part in the Košice Peace Marathon in Slovakia, and took fourth place with 2:20:22.

When training for the marathon, he ran up to 125 miles per week self-coached, and set his all-time personal bests of 13:22.8 for 3 miles (ranking him second in Britain over the distance) and 27:57.0 for 6 miles. Determined to make the Olympic marathon team, he put himself in for the Polytechnic Marathon between Windsor and Chiswick on 13 June 1964, where he set a new world record; his time of 2:13:55 broke Buddy Edelen's world best from the previous year's race by 33 seconds. This outstanding performance guaranteed Heatley's selection for the Tokyo Olympics.

=== Olympic silver medal ===
Heatley's most memorable appearance came on 21 October 1964 when he won a silver medal for Great Britain at the Tokyo Olympics. The gold medal went to defending champion, Ethiopia's Abebe Bikila, who in turn broke the world record with a time of 2:12:11.2, replacing Heatley in the record books.

Heatley was in 12th position half way through the marathon but, despite suffering from stitch for a large part of the race, he managed to work his way up the field to move into third position behind Japan's Kōkichi Tsuburaya. He was 75 seconds behind Tsuburaya at the 40 km mark and the two runners were separated by 30 metres as they approached the Olympic stadium.

Four minutes after Bikila had won the race, Tsuburaya entered the stadium in second place in front of a cheering home crowd, but he was running out of strength. Heatley sprinted the last 200 metres of the stadium lap in 32.3 seconds, overtaking Tsuburaya just 110 metres before the finish line to take second place. He had completed the marathon in 2 hours, 16 minutes and 19.2 seconds, winning the Olympic silver medal. Tsuburaya finished third in 2:16:22.8, followed by Heatley's teammate Brian Kilby in fourth place.

Heatley was the fourth Briton to win silver in the Olympic marathon (after Sam Ferris in 1932, Ernie Harper in 1936 and Tom Richards in 1948), and although Charlie Spedding took the bronze medal in Los Angeles twenty years later, no Briton has won a silver medal in the Olympic marathon since Heatley's achievement in 1964.

=== Retirement and later life ===
Heatley retired from international competition after the 1964 Games and then became a British athletics team manager. He was secretary of the Midland Cross Country Association for a number of years during the 1970s. He continued to compete in the Third Division of the Birmingham League for several years after his international retirement and remained closely involved with the sport into later life.

In 2014, Heatley and his wife Gill visited Tokyo on the 50th anniversary of the 1964 Games and met with relatives of both Tsuburaya and Bikila.

In 2015, at the age of 82, Heatley was inducted into the England Athletics Hall of Fame at the Hilton Metropole in Birmingham. He was presented with his award by former long-distance world record holder David Moorcroft.

== Personal bests ==
Heatley achieved the following personal bests during his running career:

- 3 miles: 13:22.8
- 5,000 metres: 13:57.2
- 6 miles: 27:57.0
- 10,000 metres: 28:55.8
- 10 miles: 47:47.0 (WR)
- Marathon (26.22 miles): 2:13:55 (WR)

Records
Preceded by (United States) Leonard Edelen	Men's Marathon World Record Holder; 13 June 1964 – 21 October 1964	Succeeded by (Ethiopia) Abebe Bikila
