= Joe Connolly (athlete) =

Scottish athlete

Personal information
- Nationality: British (Scottish)

Sport
- Sport: Athletics
- Event(s): Middle-distance, Long-distance, cross country
- Club: Bellahouston Harriers

Joseph Connolly is a former track and field athlete from Scotland who competed at the 1958 British Empire and Commonwealth Games (now Commonwealth Games).

== Biography ==
Connolly was a member of the Bellahouston Harriers, which he joined in 1950. He won the 1957 nine-mile Bellahouston cross country title and the 3 miles race at the 1958 Western District Championships. At the 1958 Scottish A.A.A. Championships, he finished third behind Ian Binnie in the 3 miles race.

He represented the Scottish Empire and Commonwealth Games team at the 1958 British Empire Games in Cardiff, Wales, participating in two events, the 3 miles race and the 6 miles race.

In 1959, he became the captain of the Scottish cross country team. Connolly lived in Neilsland Oval in Glasgow at the time, and won the 1961 Scottish cross country title defeating Graham Everett into second place.
