= Arthur Keily =

Olympic athlete (1921–2016)

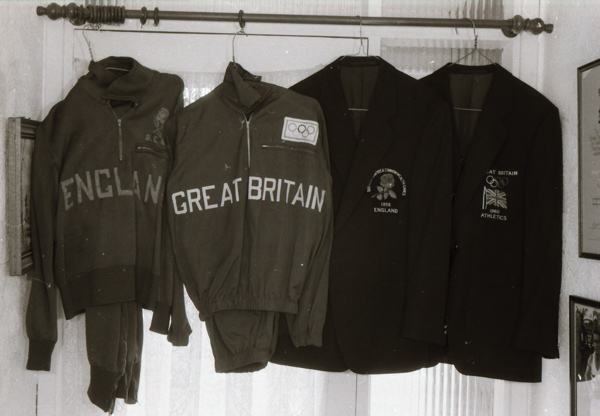
- Arthur Keily's England tracksuits

Personal information
- Nationality: British (English)
- Born: 18 March 1921 Derby, England
- Died: 2 March 2016 (aged 94) Derby, England
- Height: 165 cm (5 ft 5 in)
- Weight: 56 kg (123 lb)

Sport
- Sport: Athletics
- Event: marathon
- Club: Derby & County AC

Arthur Patrick Keily (18 March 1921 – 2 March 2016) was a British marathon runner. Originally an amateur footballer, Keily served during the Second World War and, upon his return to England, was placed on the reserve list of his former team and never again made it to the field. He took up long-distance running at the age of 28 and finished twenty-seven marathons during his career, finishing first in eleven of them and on the podium in six more. He set nine world records. After unsuccessful appearances at the 1958 British Empire and Commonwealth Games and the 1960 Summer Olympics, he retired from active competition, but re-entered the sport at the master's level in the 1990s.

== Early life ==
Keily was born on 18 March 1921 in Derby, England, the eldest surviving child in a family of twelve from County Cork, Ireland. He got his first job at the age of 14 as an apprentice blacksmith with British Rail (then British Railways) and also held a position at Derby's Grand Theatre to help provide for the family. As a youth his first athletic interest was football, where he helped lead local team Osmaston Rangers to six league and cup final victories. His career was interrupted by the Second World War when he enlisted with the Sherwood Foresters and fought in France and, although he soon returned to England after ending up on the sick list, he was placed on the reserves of his former squad and never again saw active play. His father, a sergeant with the British Army, was killed at the Battle of Dunkirk.

== Competitive career ==
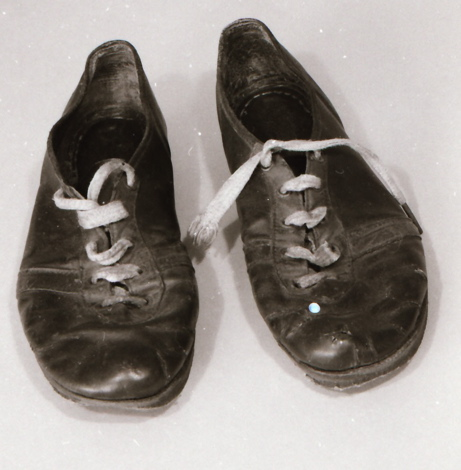
Arthur Keily's running shoes

Keily did not take an interest in competitive running until he was 28, after one of his brothers joined the Derby and County Athletic Club. In 1949 Arthur joined the club as well (as did, eventually, all six of his male siblings), but did not participate in his first marathon until 1953, finishing 12th in an event that spanned from Doncaster to Sheffield. One year later, however, it was in this race that he recorded his first victory, completing the course in 2:30:45, five seconds ahead of the previous year's champion. Between his first victory and his appearance at the 1960 Summer Olympics, he competed in twenty-seven local and international marathons, winning eleven of them and placing within the top three in an additional six. He was soon chosen as club captain and helped them become national champions in 1960 after instituting a more difficult training routine. He was stricter still with himself and, in his prime, ran more than 130 miles a week as part of his training regimen.

After failing to qualify for the 1956 Summer Olympics, Keily participated in the Košice Marathon twice, finishing 12th in 1956 and 6th in 1957, and then attended the 1958 British Empire and Commonwealth Games as a representative for the England athletics team, completing the marathon in 12th position after falling ill shortly before the race.

His final stop was the 1960 Summer Olympics marathon in Rome, and he led the pack through twelve miles. The fast start resulted in an eventual world record for winner, Ethiopia's Abebe Bikila, though Keily faded to place 25th in a field of 69 competitors in the marathon. He blamed his performance on the team's arrival too late to acclimate to Rome's conditions. During this period Keily also participated in twenty-one British national road relays, helping set new records in thirteen of them, but he retired from active competition following his sole Olympic appearance. He had set nine world records during his career: the half marathon, the track marathon, 15, 30, and 45 miles, 45, 50, and 60 km, and the furthest distance run in three hours.

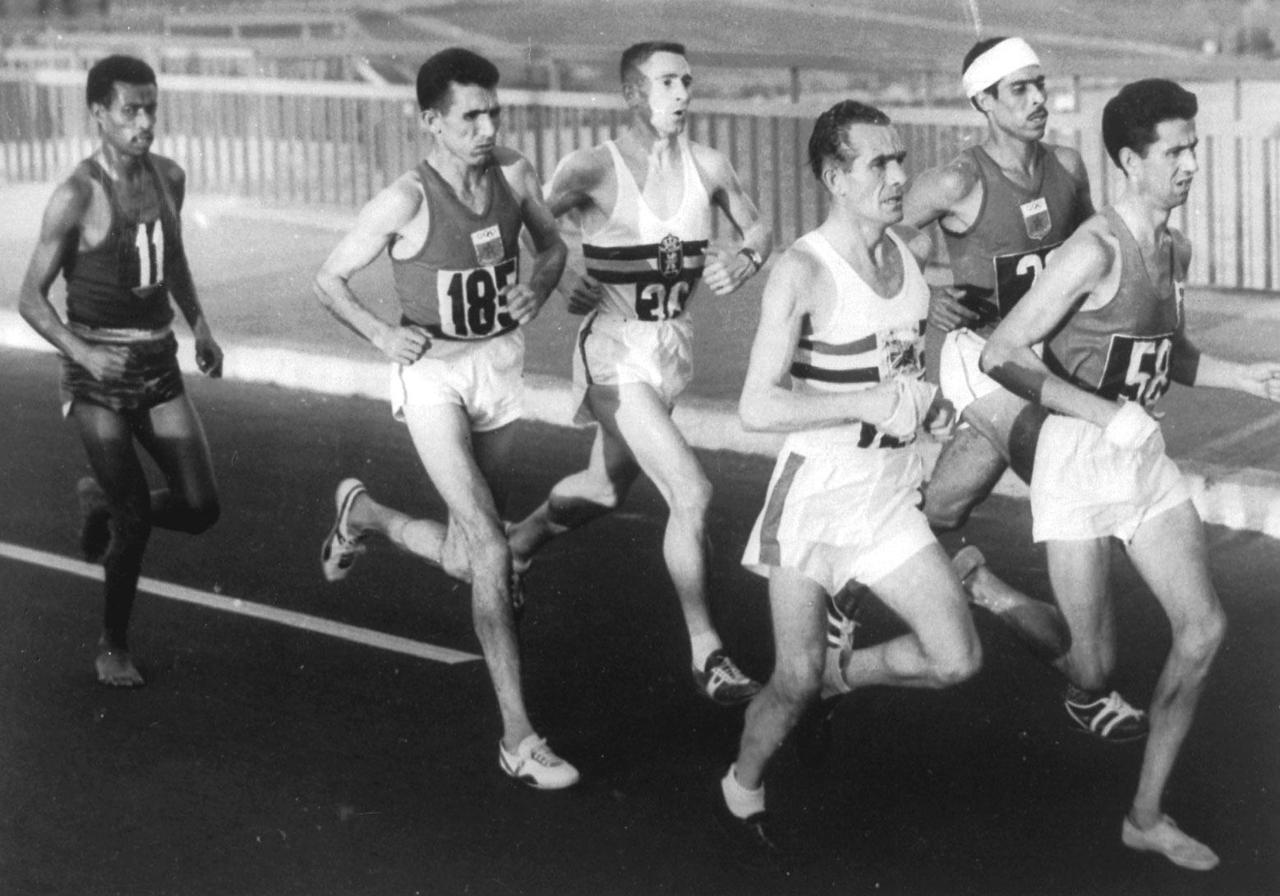
The 1960 Olympic marathon's lead pack, near the 10 km (6 mi) mark, Bikila (#11), following Bertie Messitt (#58), Bakir Benaïssa, Keily (#46), Aurèle Vandendriessche (#36), and Rhadi Ben Abdesselam (#185).

== Later life ==
Following two decades with British Rail, Keily found a job with Rolls-Royce Limited in 1957 and worked there until 1962, when he joined the promotions department of Derby County F.C. His final position was that of a greyhound racing adviser with the Derby Telegraph. Following his retirement he wrote several books on health and fitness and returned to long-distance running at the master's level. In 1991 he set a world record for his age class in the marathon at 3:24:22 and in 2001 he was the British master's champion in 80+ category of both the 400 m and 3000 m. The Derby Museum and Art Gallery has a display showing medals and awards from his career and he has also been honoured with numerous awards for his charity work including the Derby Civic Award (1992) and the Queen Elizabeth II Golden Jubilee Medal (2002). For his sporting achievements, he was presented with the Lifetime Achievement in Sport Award in 2008 from the city of Derby and an Honorary Degree of Master of the University from the University of Derby in 2011. He died 2 March 2016 at the age of 94.
