= Gerry McIntyre =

Long distance runner

Personal information
- Nationality: Irish
- Born: 22 May 1929 Birmingham, England
- Died: 27 January 2008 (aged 78)

Sport
- Sport: Track
- Event: Marathon
- Club: Ponders End AC

Gerald McIntyre (22 May 1929 – 27 January 2008) was a long distance and cross country runner. He represented both Clonliffe Harriers and Ponders End AC, London. He ran the marathon at the 1960 Summer Olympics in Rome, finishing 22nd with a time of 2:26:03.

He competed at both the 1960 International Cross Country and 1961 International Cross Country championships.
