= Abebe Bikila =

Ethiopian marathon runner (1932–1973)

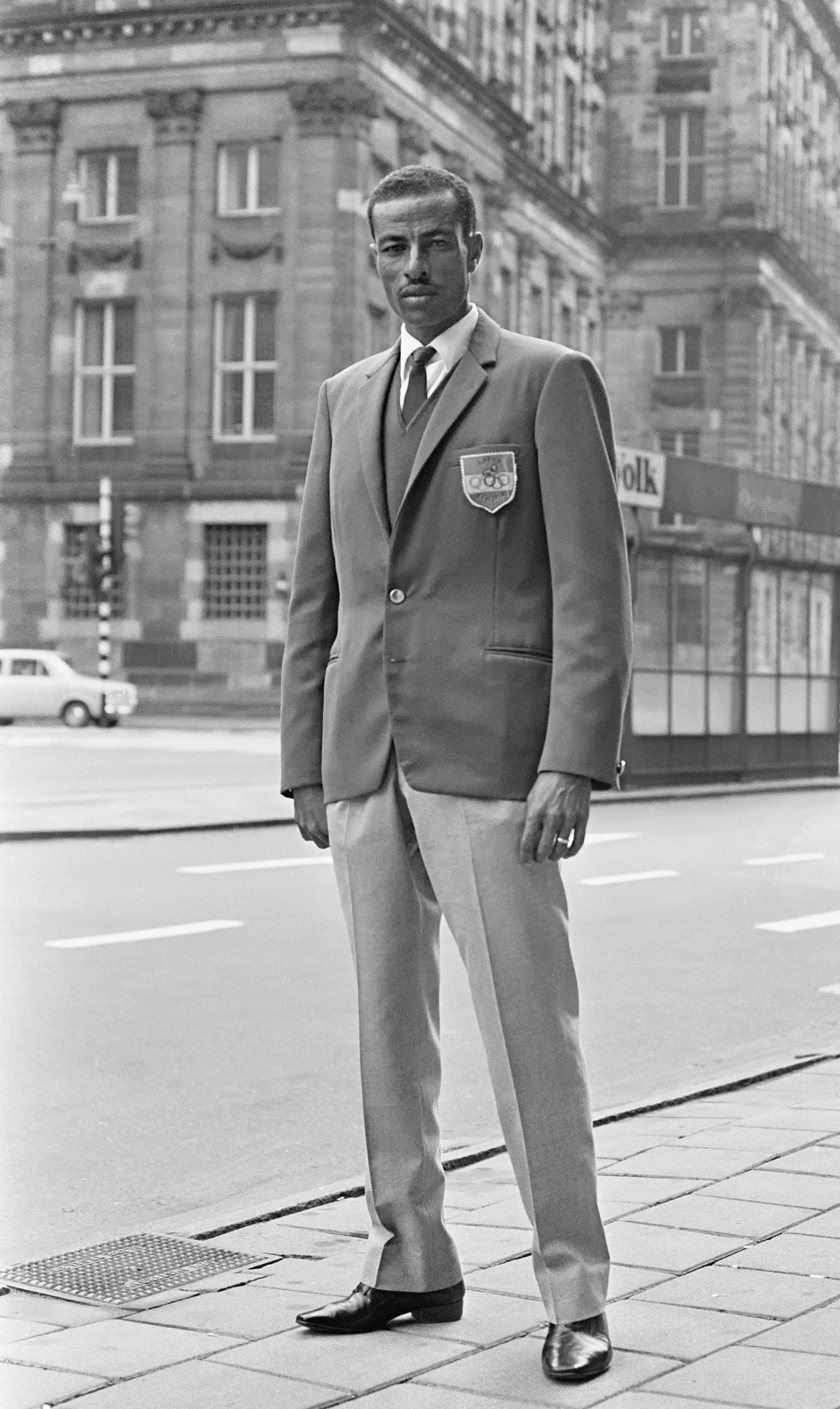
- Bikila in 1968

Personal information
- Native name: Abebe Bikila
- Born: August 7, 1932 Jato, Shewa, Ethiopian Empire
- Died: October 25, 1973 (aged 41) Addis Ababa, Ethiopia
- Resting place: Saint Joseph Church, Addis Ababa; 8°58′9.7″N 38°45′53.6″E
- Height: 177 cm (5 ft 10 in)
- Weight: 57 kg (126 lb)

Sport
- Sport: Long-distance running
- Events: Marathon, 10,000 m

Achievements and titles
- Personal bests: Marathon – 2:12:11.2 (Tokyo 1964); 10,000 m – 29:00.8 (Berlin 1962)
Medal record
Representing Ethiopia
Summer Olympics
Gold medal – first place	1960 Rome	Marathon
Gold medal – first place	1964 Tokyo	Marathon

Shambel Abebe Bikila (Amharic: ሻምበል አበበ ቢቂላ; August 7, 1932 – October 25, 1973) was an Ethiopian marathon runner who was a back-to-back Olympic marathon champion. He was the first Ethiopian Olympic gold medalist, winning his first gold medal at the 1960 Summer Olympics in Rome while running barefoot. At the 1964 Tokyo Olympics, he won his second gold medal, making him the first athlete to successfully defend an Olympic marathon title. In both victories, he ran in world record time.

Born in Shewa, Abebe moved to Addis Ababa around 1952 and joined the 5th Infantry Regiment of the Ethiopian Imperial Guard, an elite infantry division that safeguarded the emperor of Ethiopia. Abebe served in the Kagnew Battalion during the Korean War.

Enlisting as a soldier before his athletic career, he rose to the rank of shambel (captain). Abebe participated in a total of sixteen marathons. He placed second on his first marathon in Addis Ababa, won twelve other races, and finished fifth in the 1963 Boston Marathon. In July 1967, he sustained the first of several sports-related leg injuries that prevented him from finishing his last two marathons. Abebe was a pioneer in long-distance running. Mamo Wolde, Juma Ikangaa, Tegla Loroupe, Paul Tergat, and Haile Gebrselassie—all recipients of the New York Road Runners' Abebe Bikila Award—are a few of the athletes who have followed in his footsteps to establish East Africa as a force in long-distance running.

On March 22, 1969, Abebe was paralysed due to a car accident. He regained some upper-body mobility, but he never walked again. While he was receiving medical treatment in England, Abebe competed in archery and table tennis at the 1970 Stoke Mandeville Games in London. Those games were an early predecessor of the Paralympic Games. He competed in both sports at a 1971 competition for disabled people in Norway and won its cross-country sleigh-riding event. Abebe died at age 41 in 1973 of a cerebral haemorrhage related to his accident four years earlier. He received a state funeral, and Emperor Haile Selassie declared a national day of mourning. Many schools, venues, and events, including Abebe Bikila Stadium in Addis Ababa, are named after him. He is the subject of biographies and films documenting his athletic career, and he is often featured in publications about the marathon and the Olympics.

== Biography ==
=== Early life ===
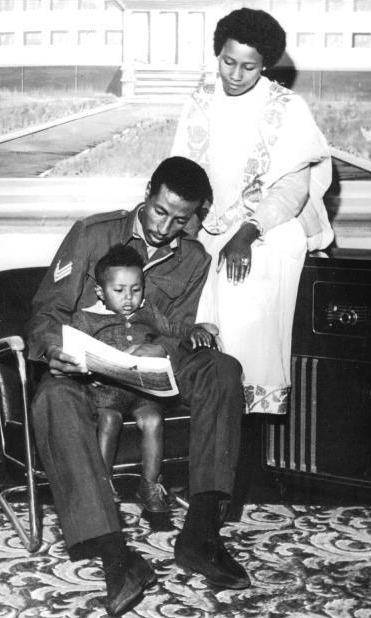
Abebe with wife Yewebdar and one of their children

Abebe Bikila was born on August 7, 1932, in the small community of Jato, then part of the Selale District of Shewa. His birthday coincided with the 1932 Los Angeles Olympic marathon. Abebe was the son of Wudinesh Beneberu and her second husband, Demissie. During the Second Italo-Ethiopian War (1935–1937), his family was forced to move to the remote town of Gorro. By then, Wudinesh had divorced Abebe's father and married Temtime Kefelew. The family eventually moved back to Jato (or nearby Jirru), where they had a farm.

As a young boy, Abebe played gena, a traditional long-distance hockey game played with goalposts sometimes kilometres apart. Around 1952, he joined the 5th Infantry Regiment of the Imperial Guard after moving to Addis Ababa the year before. During the mid-1950s, Abebe ran 20 km (12 mi) from the hills of Sululta to Addis Ababa and back every day. Onni Niskanen, a Swedish coach employed by the Ethiopian government to train the Imperial Guard, soon noticed him and began training him for the marathon. In 1956, Abebe finished second to Wami Biratu in the Ethiopian Armed Forces championship. According to biographer Tim Judah, his entry in the Olympics was a "long planned operation" and not a last-minute decision, as was commonly thought.

Abebe was 27 when he married 15-year-old Yewebdar Wolde-Giorgis on March 16, 1960. (Note: John Underwood, in his 1965 Sports Illustrated profile of Abebe, quotes him as stating that he was "married when [he] was 26," (i.e. 1958 or 1959). However, Abebe's biographer Tim Judah states that "The two were married on March 16, 1960.") Although the marriage was arranged by his mother, Abebe was happy and they remained married for the rest of his life.

=== 1960 Rome Olympics ===
In July 1960, Abebe won his first marathon in Addis Ababa. A month later he won again in Addis Ababa with a time of 2:21:23, which was faster than the existing Olympic record held by Emil Zátopek. Niskanen entered Abebe Bikila and Abebe Wakgira in the marathon at the 1960 Rome Olympics, which would be run on September 10. In Rome, Abebe purchased new running shoes, but they did not fit well and gave him blisters. He consequently decided to run barefoot instead.

Due to Rome's blistering heat, the race started in late-afternoon at the foot of the Capitoline Hill staircase and finished at night at the Arch of Constantine, just outside the Colosseum. The course twice passed Piazza di Porta Capena, where the Obelisk of Axum was then located. When the runners passed the obelisk the first time, Abebe was at the rear of the lead pack, which included Great Britain's Arthur Keily, Moroccan Rhadi Ben Abdesselam, Ireland's Bertie Messitt, and Belgian Aurèle Vandendriessche.

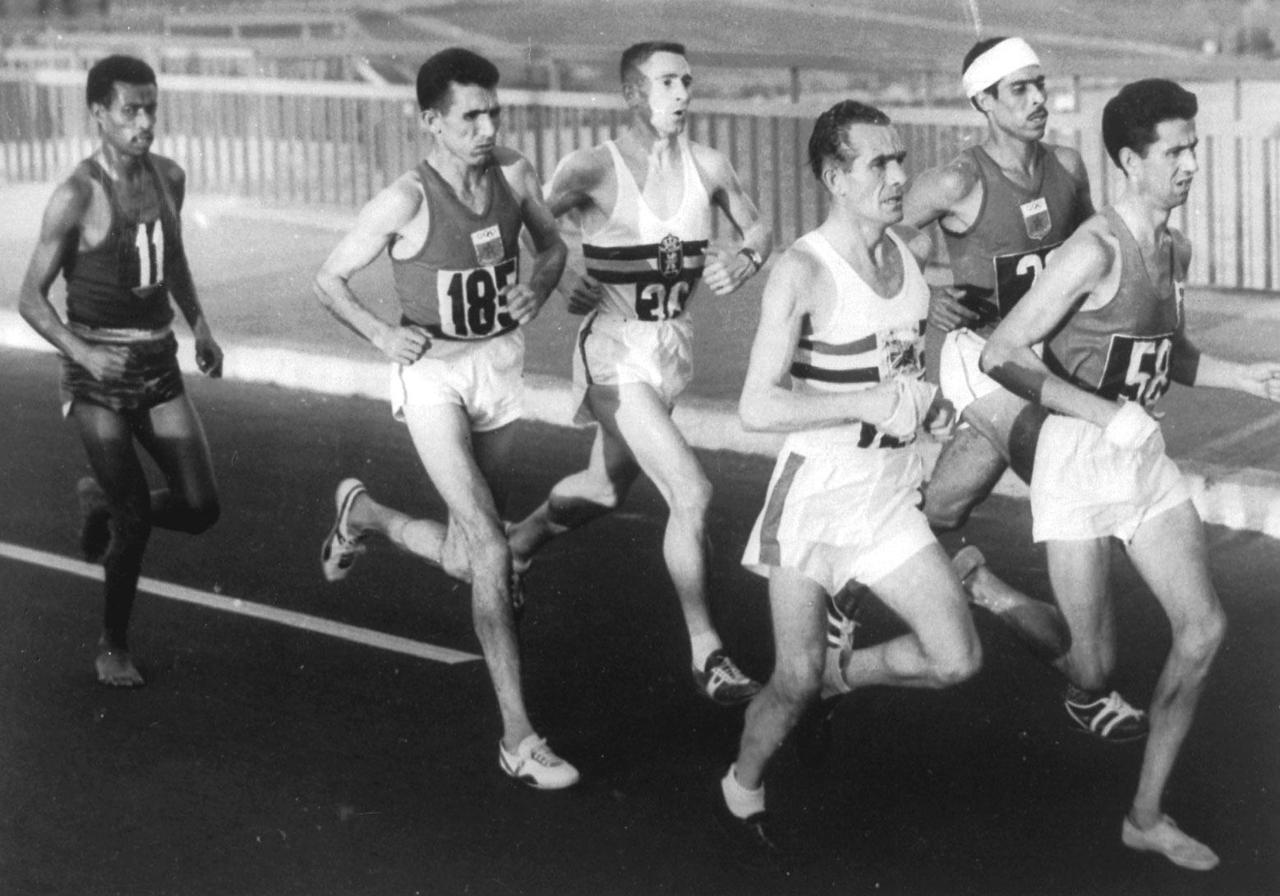
Abebe (#11), following Bertie Messitt (#58), Bakir Benaïssa, Arthur Keily (#46), Aurèle Vandendriessche (#36), and Rhadi Ben Abdesselam (#185)

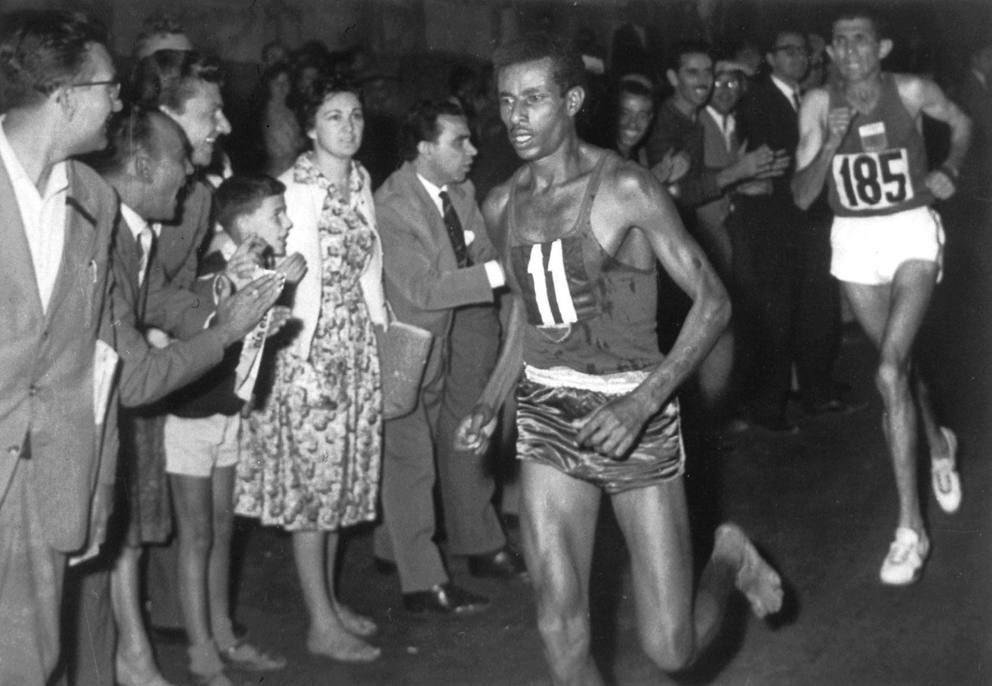
Moving away from Ben Abdesselam

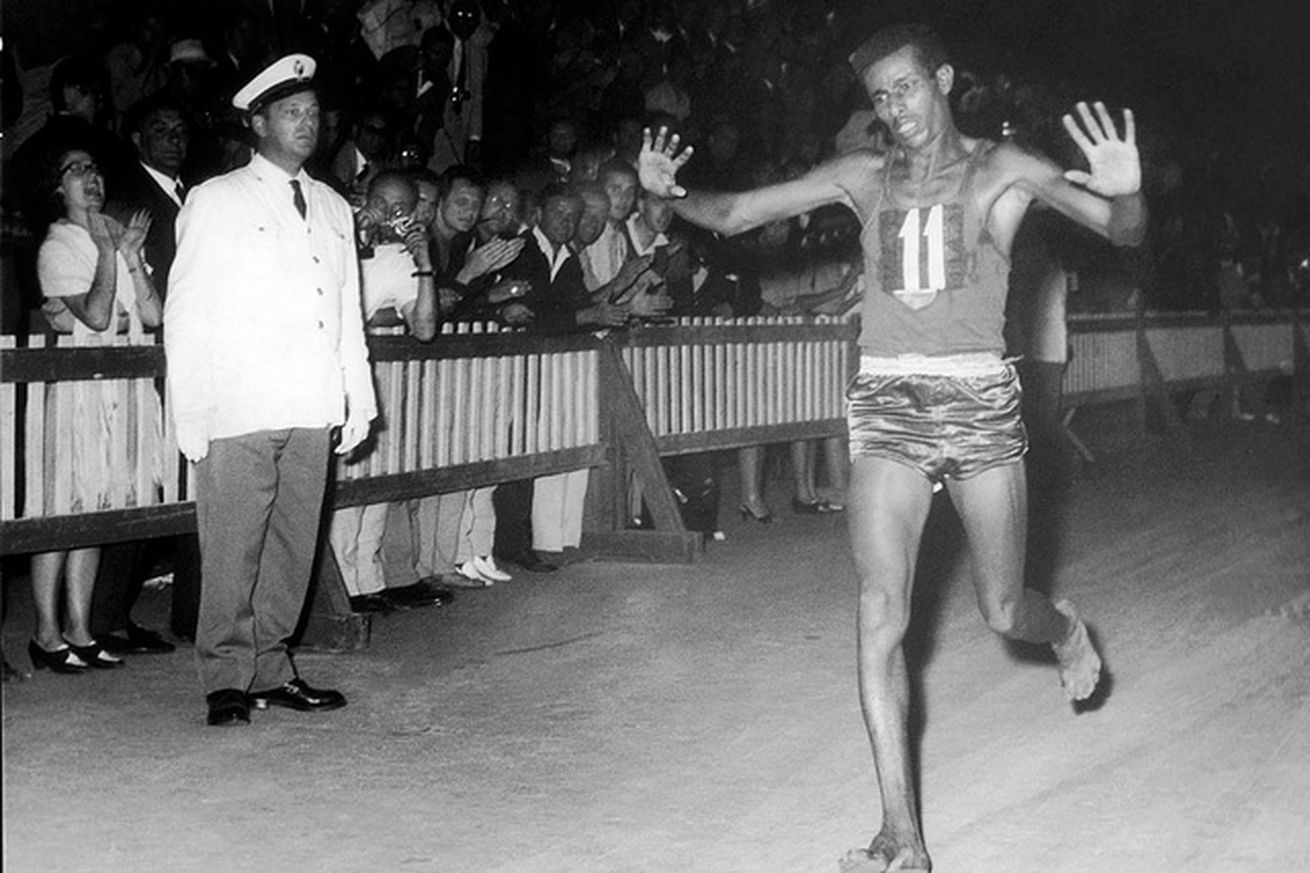
Crossing the finish line

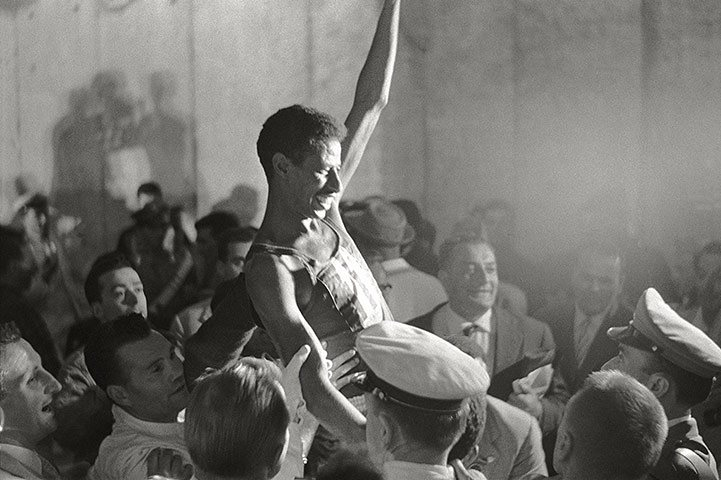
Celebrating outside the Colosseum

Between 5 km (3 mi) and 20 km (12 mi), the lead changed hands several times. By about 25 km (16 mi), however, Abebe and Ben Abdesselam moved away from the rest of the pack. Trailing by about two minutes at the 30 km (19 mi) mark were New Zealand's Barry Magee, who was to finish third in 2:17:18.2 and Sergei Popov, the world marathon record holder at the time, who finished fifth.

Abebe and Ben Abdesselam remained together until the last 500 m (1,600 ft). Nearing the obelisk again, Abebe sprinted to the finish. In the early-evening darkness, his path along the Appian Way was lined with Italian soldiers holding torches. Abebe's winning time was 2:15:16.2, twenty-five seconds faster than ben Abdesselam at 2:15:41.6, and breaking Popov's world record by eight tenths of a second. Immediately after crossing the finish line Abebe began to touch his toes and run in place, and later said that he could have run another 10–15 km (6–9 mi).

=== 1960–1964 ===
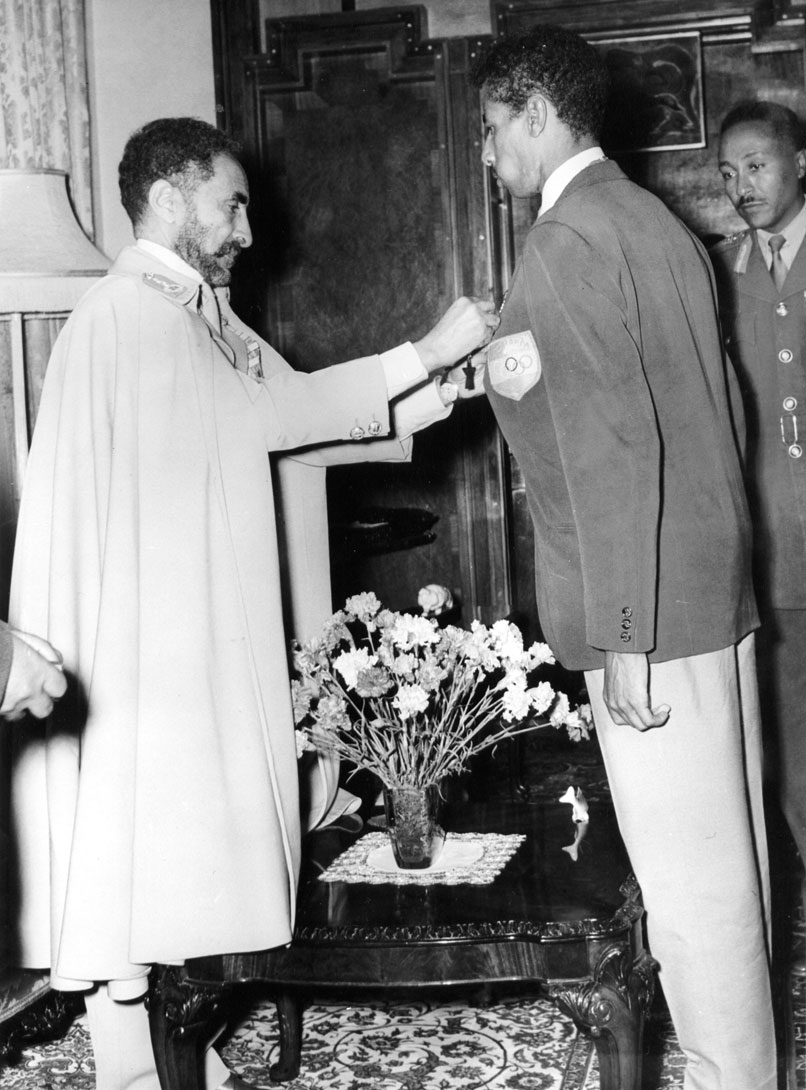
Emperor Haile Selassie confers the Star of Ethiopia on Abebe after his victory in the Olympic marathon, 1960.

Abebe returned to his homeland as a hero. He was greeted by a large crowd, many dignitaries and the commander of the Imperial Guard, Brigadier-General Mengistu Neway. Abebe was paraded through the streets of Addis Ababa along a procession route lined with thousands of people and presented to Emperor Haile Selassie. The Emperor awarded him the Star of Ethiopia and promoted him to the rank of asiraleqa (corporal). He was given the use of a chauffeur-driven Volkswagen Beetle (since he did not yet know how to drive) and home, both owned by the guard.

On December 13, 1960, while Haile Selassie was on a state visit to Brazil, Imperial Guard forces led by Mengistu Neway began an unsuccessful coup and briefly proclaimed Selassie's eldest son Asfaw Wossen Taffari emperor. Fighting took place in the heart of Addis Ababa, shells detonated in the Jubilee Palace, and many of those closest to the Emperor were killed. Although Abebe was not directly involved, he was briefly arrested and questioned. Mengistu was later hanged, and his forces (which included many members of the Imperial Guard) were killed in the fighting, arrested or fled.

In the 1961 Athens Classical Marathon, Abebe again won while running barefoot. This was the second and last event in which he competed barefooted. The same year he won the marathons in Osaka and Košice. While in Japan, he was approached by a Japanese shoe company, Onitsuka Tiger, with the possibility of wearing its shoes; they were informed by Niskanen that Abebe had "other commitments". Kihachiro Onitsuka suspected that Abebe had a secret sponsorship deal with Puma, in spite of the now-abandoned rules against such deals.

Abebe ran the 1963 Boston Marathon—which was between his Olympic wins in 1960 and 1964—and finished fifth in 2:24:43. This was the only time in his competitive career that he completed an international marathon without winning. He and countryman Mamo Wolde, who finished 12th, had run together on record pace for 18 miles, until cold winds and the hills in Newton caused both to fall back. The race was won by Belgium's Aurele Vandendriessche in a course record 2:18:58. Abebe returned to Ethiopia and did not compete in another marathon until 1964 in Addis Ababa. He won that race in a time of 2:23:14.8.

=== 1964 Tokyo Olympics ===
Universal Newsreel footage of the 1964 Olympic Men's marathon

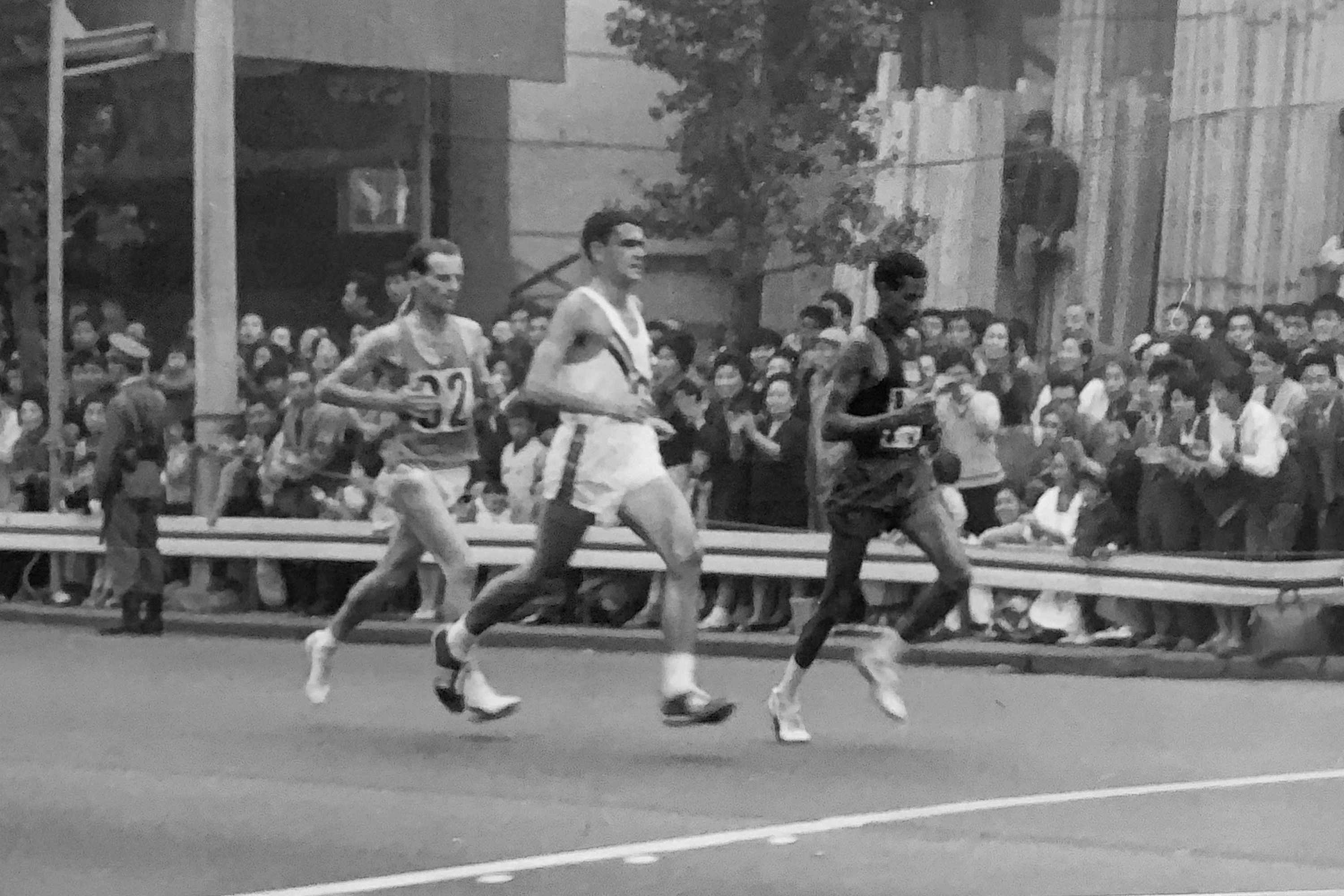
1964 Tokyo Olympics

Forty days before the 1964 Summer Olympics in Tokyo, Abebe began to feel pain while training in Debre Zeit. He was brought to the hospital and diagnosed with acute appendicitis, and had an appendectomy on September 16. Back on his feet in a few days, Abebe left the hospital within a week.

He entered the October 21 marathon wearing Puma shoes. This was in contrast to the previous Olympics in Rome, where he ran barefoot. Abebe began the race right behind the lead pack until about the 10 km (6 mi) mark, when he slowly increased his pace. At 15 km (9 mi), he was in third place behind Ron Clarke of Australia—who had been upset by Billy Mills in the 10,000 meters—and Jim Hogan of Ireland. Shortly before 20 km (12 mi), Abebe took the lead; only Hogan was in contention, as Clarke began to slow. By 35 km (22 mi), Abebe was almost two-and-a-half minutes in front of Hogan and Kokichi Tsuburaya of Japan was 17 seconds behind Hogan in third place. Hogan soon dropped out, exhausted, leaving only Tsuburaya three minutes behind Abebe by the 40 km (25 mi) mark.

Abebe entered the Olympic stadium alone, to the cheers of 75,000 spectators. The crowd had been listening on the radio and anticipated his triumphant entrance. Abebe finished with a time of 2:12:11.2, four minutes and eight seconds ahead of silver medallist Basil Heatley of Great Britain, who passed Tsuburaya inside the stadium. Tsuburaya was third, a few seconds behind Heatley. Abebe did not appear exhausted after the finish, and he again performed a routine of calisthenics, which included touching "his toes twice then [lying] down on his back, cycling his legs in the air".

He was the first runner to successfully defend an Olympic marathon title. As of the 2024 Olympic marathon in Paris, Abebe, Waldemar Cierpinski, and Eliud Kipchoge are the only athletes to have won two gold medals in the event, and they all did it back-to-back. For the second time, Abebe received Ethiopia's only gold medal and again returned home to a hero's welcome. The Emperor promoted him to the commissioned-officer rank of metoaleqa (lieutenant). Abebe received the Order of Menelik II, a Volkswagen Beetle and a house.

=== 1965–1968 ===
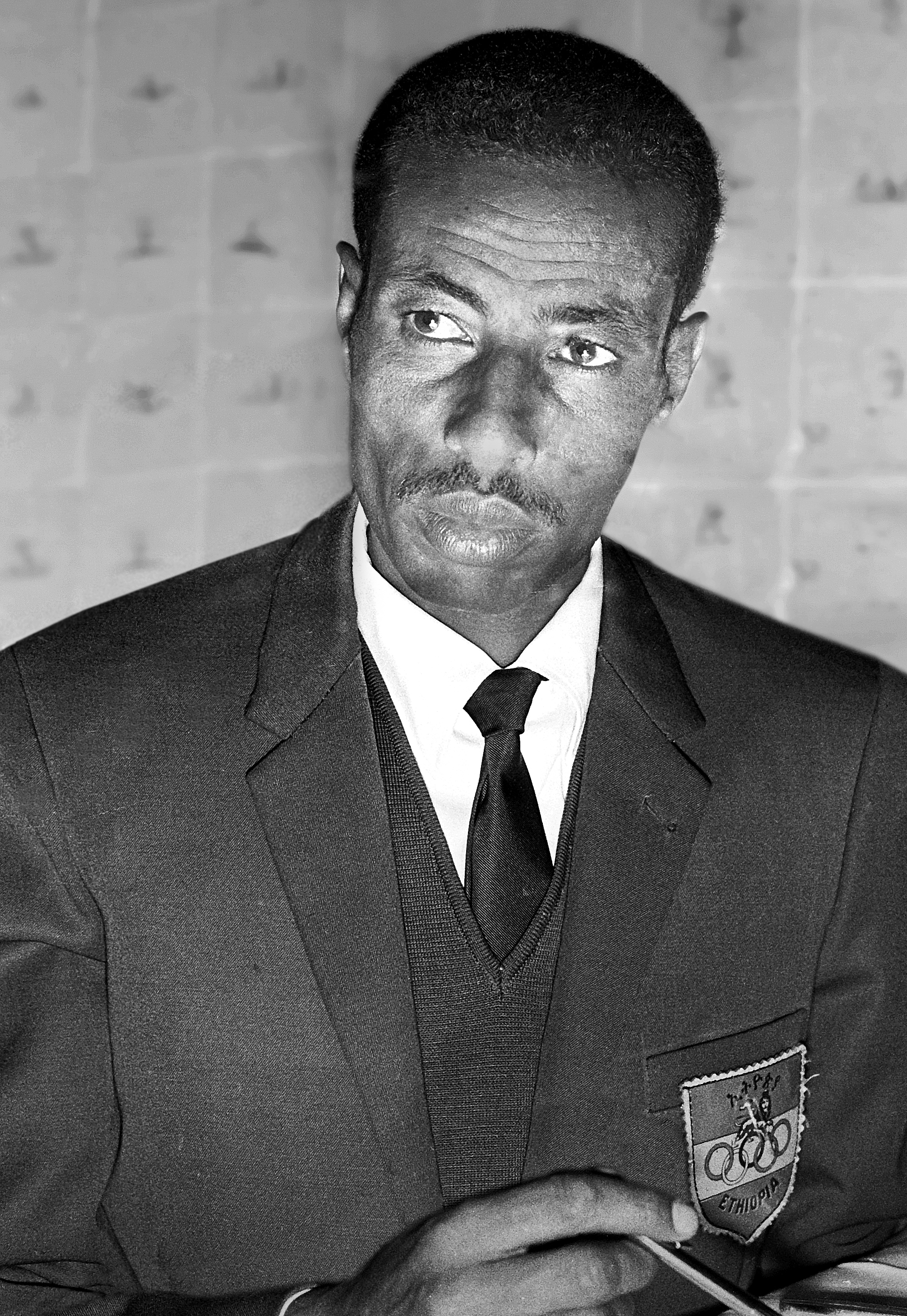
Abebe in 1968

On April 21, 1965, as part of the opening ceremonies for the second season of the 1964–1965 New York World's Fair, Abebe and fellow athlete and Imperial Guardsman Mamo Wolde, ran a ceremonial half-marathon from the Arsenal in Central Park (at 64th Street and Fifth Avenue in Manhattan) to the Singer Bowl at the fair. They carried a parchment scroll with greetings from Haile Selassie.

The following month, Abebe returned to Japan and won his second Mainichi Marathon, held in Shiga Prefecture. In 1966 he ran marathons at Zarautz and Inchon–Seoul, winning both. The following year, Abebe did not finish the Zarautz International Marathon in July 1967. He had injured his hamstring, an injury from which he would never recover. Abebe had begun to limp, and the 1966 Incheon–Seoul Marathon was the last marathon he ever completed.

In July 1968, he travelled to Germany for treatment of "circulatory ailments" in his legs; the German government refused to accept payment for the medical services. Abebe returned in time to join the rest of the Ethiopian Olympic team training in Asmara, which has an altitude (2,200 m or 7,200 ft) and climate similar to Mexico City (the host of the next Olympic Games).

Seeking a third consecutive gold medal, Abebe entered the October 20 Olympic marathon with Mamo Wolde and Gebru Merawi. Symbolically, he was issued bib number 1 for the race. A week before the race, Abebe developed pain in his left leg. Doctors discovered a fracture in his fibula, and he was advised to stay off his feet until the day of the race. Abebe had to drop out of the race after approximately 16 km (10 mi) and Mamo Wolde won in 2:20:26.4. This was Abebe's last marathon appearance. He was rewarded with a promotion to the rank of shambel (captain) upon his return to Ethiopia.

=== Accident and death ===
On the night of March 22, 1969, Abebe lost control of his Volkswagen Beetle and it overturned, trapping him inside. According to biographer Tim Judah, he may have been drinking. Judah quotes Abebe's account of the accident from the biography by his daughter, Tsige Abebe, that he tried "to avoid a fast, oncoming car". Judah wrote that it was difficult to know for certain what happened. Abebe was freed from his car the following morning and brought to the Imperial Guard hospital. The accident left him a quadriplegic, paralysed from the neck down; he never walked again. On March 29 Abebe was transferred to Stoke Mandeville Hospital in England, where he spent eight months receiving treatment. He was visited by Queen Elizabeth II and received get-well cards from all over the world. Although Abebe could not move his head at first, his condition eventually improved to paraplegia, regaining the use of his arms.

In 1970, Abebe began training for wheelchair-athlete archery competitions. In July, he competed in archery and table tennis at the Stoke Mandeville Wheelchair Games in London. The following April, Abebe participated in games for disabled people in Norway. Although he had been invited as a guest, he competed in archery and table tennis and defeated a field of sixteen in cross-country sled dog racing with a time of 1:16:17.

Abebe was invited to the 1972 Summer Olympics in Munich as a special guest, and received a standing ovation during the opening ceremony. His countryman Mamo Wolde did not match his back-to-back Olympic marathon victories, finishing third behind Frank Shorter of the United States and Karel Lismont of Belgium. After Shorter received his gold medal, he shook Abebe's hand.

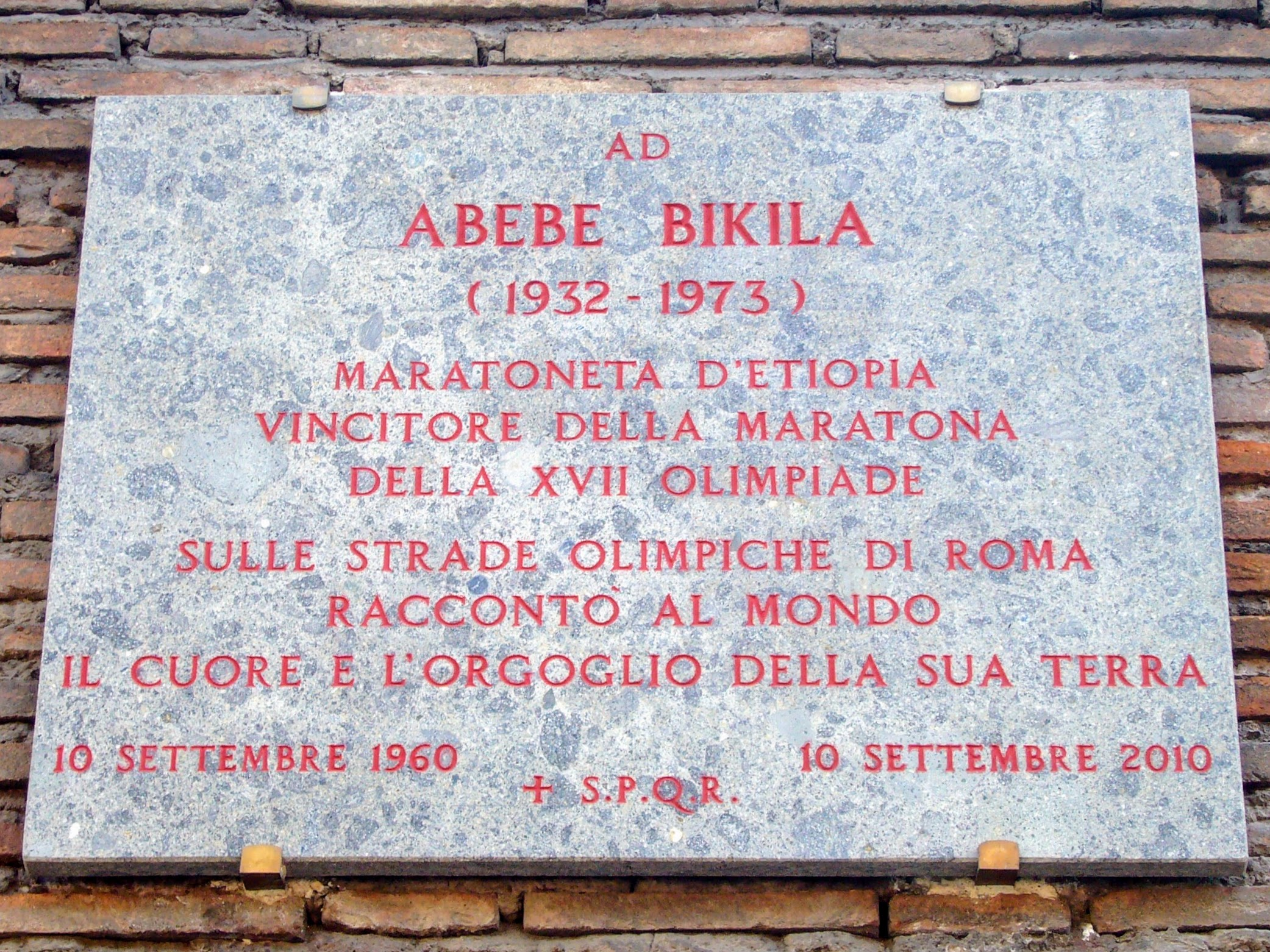
Plaque commemorating Abebe on the Via di San Gregorio in Rome

On October 25, 1973, Abebe died in Addis Ababa at age 41 of a cerebral hemorrhage, a complication related to his accident four years earlier. He was buried with full military honours; his state funeral was attended by an estimated 65,000 people including Emperor Haile Selassie, who proclaimed a day of mourning for the country's national hero. Abebe is interred in a tomb with a bronze statue at Saint Joseph Church in Addis Ababa.

== Legacy ==
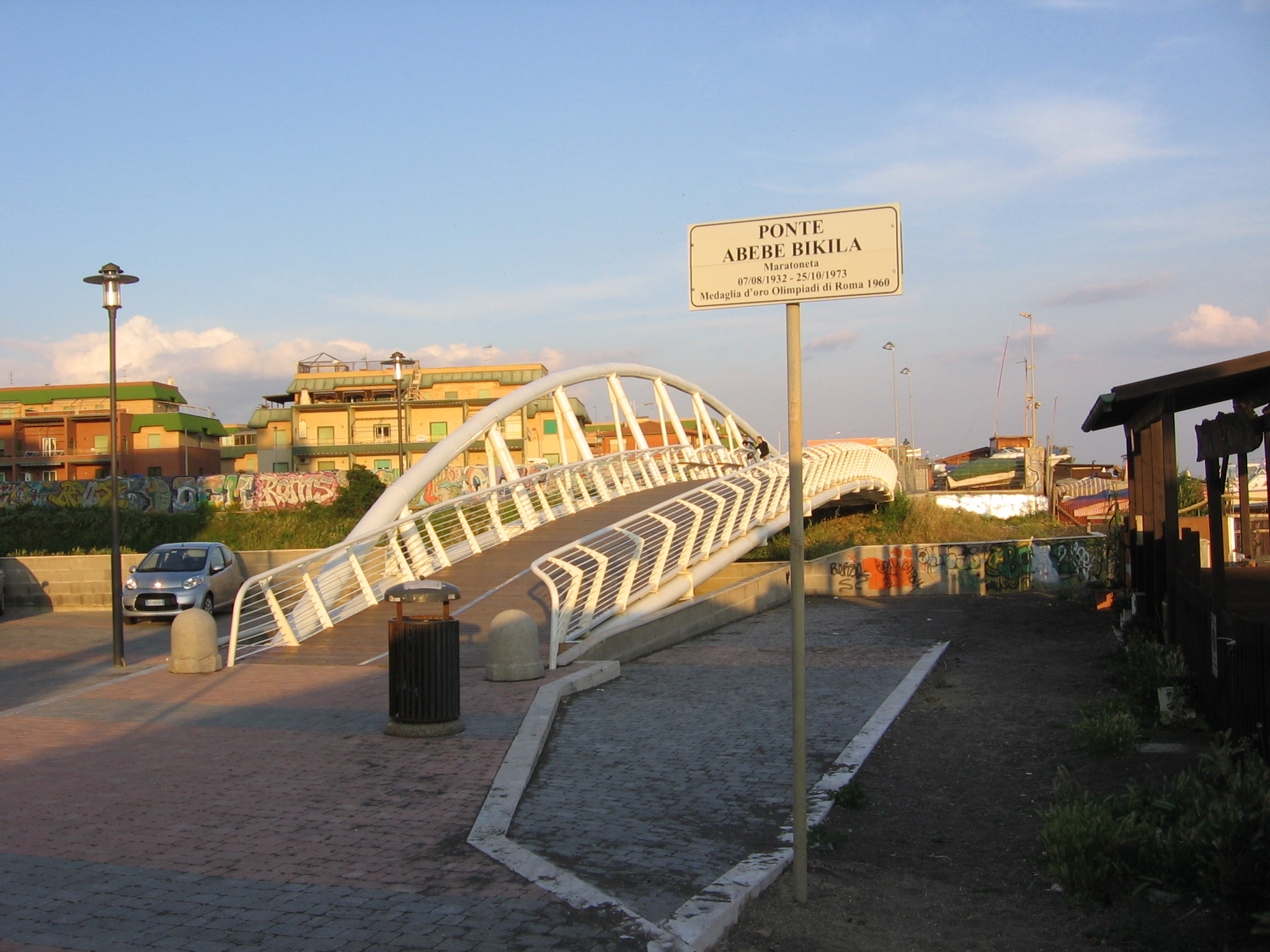
Abebe Bikila Bridge in Ladispoli, Italy

Abebe began, and largely inspired, East African preeminence in long-distance running. According to Kenny Moore, a contemporary athlete and writer for Sports Illustrated, he began "the great African distance running avalanche." Abebe brought to the forefront the now-accepted relationship between endurance and high-altitude training in all kinds of sports. Five years after his death, the New York Road Runners inaugurated the annual Abebe Bikila Award for contributions by an individual to long-distance running. East African recipients include Mamo Wolde, Juma Ikangaa, Tegla Loroupe, Paul Tergat, and Haile Gebrselassie.

He is a national hero in Ethiopia, and a stadium in Addis Ababa is named in his honour. In late 1972, the American Community School of Addis Ababa dedicated its gymnasium (which included facilities for disabled people) to Abebe.

On March 21, 2010, the Rome Marathon observed the 50th anniversary of his Olympic victory. The winner, Ethiopian runner Siraj Gena, ran the last 300 m (984 ft) of the race barefoot and received a €5,000 bonus. A plaque commemorating the anniversary is mounted on a wall on the Via di San Gregorio, and a footbridge in Ladispoli was named in Abebe's honour.

According to Abebe's New York Times obituary, Abebe and Yewebdar had three sons, along with their daughter Tsige. In 2010, the Italian company Vibram introduced the "Bikila" model of its FiveFingers line of minimalist shoes. In February 2015, Abebe's surviving children Teferi, Tsige and Yetnayet Abebe Bikila, along with their mother, filed a lawsuit in United States federal court in Tacoma, Washington, claiming Vibram violated federal law and the state's Personality Rights Act. The case was dismissed in October 2016 on the grounds that the plaintiffs were aware of Vibram's use of the name in 2011, but did not file suit until four years later. According to judge Ronald Leighton, "this unreasonable delay prejudiced Vibram."

It came to light in December 2019 that the family of Abebe received his Olympic ring that he lost at the Tokyo Olympic stadium's bathroom. Abebe left his winning ring in a bathroom after he won the Olympic medal. A woman who was working in the bathroom at that time took it home with her. The woman has since died, but her son said his mom later regretted taking the ring and was waiting for an opportunity to return it. He gave the ring to Yetnayet, son of the late Abebe when Yetnayet came to Kasama City in Japan in December 2019 as a guest of honour for the half marathon competition conducted in honour of his father.

== In popular culture ==
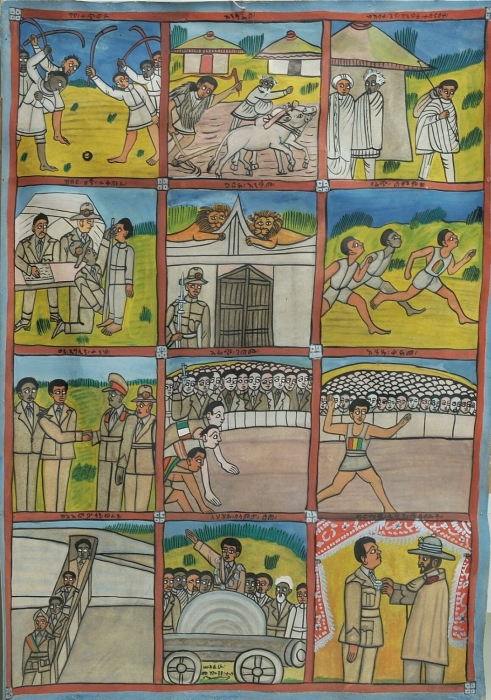
Folk art depicting Abebe's life

Abebe has been featured in several documentaries about his life and the Olympics in general. His victory at the 1964 Olympics was featured in the 1965 documentary, Tokyo Olympiad directed by Kon Ichikawa. Footage from that film was recycled in the 1976 thriller, Marathon Man directed by John Schlesinger and starring Dustin Hoffman. Abebe was the subject of Bud Greenspan's 1972 documentary, The Ethiopians. The documentary was incorporated into "The Marathon", a 1976 episode of Greenspan's The Olympiad television documentary series. "The Marathon", which chronicles Abebe's two Olympic victories, ends with a dedication ceremony for a gymnasium named in Abebe's honour shortly before his death.

In 1992, Yamada Kazuhiro published the first full biography about Abebe, written in Japanese and published in Tokyo; it was entitled Do You Remember Abebe? (Japanese: アベベを覚えてますか). Since then, there have been at least three biographical works based on his life. Among these is Triumph and Tragedy, written in English by his daughter Tsige Abebe and published in Addis Ababa in 1996. The other two, also written in English, are Paul Rambali's 2007 fictional biographical novel Barefoot Runner and Tim Judah's 2009 Bikila: Ethiopia's Barefoot Olympian. According to the journalist Tim Lewis's comparative review of the two books, Judah's is a more journalistic, less-forgiving biography of Abebe. It refutes the mythical aspects of his life but recognises Abebe's athletic accomplishments. Judah's account of Abebe's life differs significantly from Rambali's, but confirms (and frequently cites) Tsige's biography. For example, Lewis cites the discrepancy in the circumstances surrounding Abebe's car accident:

Rambali pictures [Abebe] driving to training in his VW Beetle, only to be forced off the road by a group of students ('screaming, blood-covered young men') who are being chased by armed police. The facts uncovered by Judah point to a less poetic explanation: [Abebe] was last seen in a bar at 9 pm, the roads that night were wet and he was inexperienced behind the wheel.

Abebe is also the subject of a 2009 feature film, Atletu (The Athlete), directed by Davey Frankel and Rasselas Lakew. The film starring Rasselas focuses on the final years of Abebe's life: his quest to regain the Olympic title, the accident and his struggle to compete again.

Robin Williams referred to Abebe's barefoot running during his 2009 stand-up comedy tour, Weapons of Self-Destruction: "[Abebe] won the Rome Olympics running barefoot. He was then sponsored by Adidas. He ran the next Olympics; he carried the fucking shoes". Abebe did not carry his shoes but wore them; he was not sponsored by Adidas but was perhaps secretly sponsored by Puma.

== Marathon performances ==
Year	Competition	Venue	Position	Notes
	Representing Ethiopia			
1956	Armed Forces championship	Addis Ababa, Ethiopia	2nd	
1960	Armed Forces championship	Addis Ababa, Ethiopia	1st	2:39:50
1960	Olympic Trials	Addis Ababa, Ethiopia	1st	2:21:23
1960	Olympic Games	Rome, Italy	1st	2:15:16.2
1961	Athens International Marathon	Athens, Greece	1st	2:23:44.6
1961	Mainichi Marathon	Osaka, Japan	1st	2:29:27
1961	Košice Marathon	Košice, Czechoslovakia	1st	2:20:12.0
1963	Boston Marathon	Boston, US	5th	2:24:43a
1964	Armed Forces championship	Addis Ababa, Ethiopia	1st	2:23:14.8
1964	Olympic Trials	Addis Ababa, Ethiopia	1st	2:16:18.8
1964	Olympic Games	Tokyo, Japan	1st	2:12:11.2
1965	Mainichi Marathon	Shiga Prefecture, Japan	1st	2:22:55.8
1966	Zarautz International Marathon	Zarautz, Spain	1st	2:20:28.8
1966	Incheon–Seoul Marathon	Seoul, South Korea	1st	2:17:04a
1967	Zarautz International Marathon	Zarautz, Spain	DNF	
1968	Olympic Games	Mexico City, Mexico	DNF	

== See also ==
- Ethiopia at the Olympics
- List of athletes who have competed in the Paralympics and Olympics
- Marathon world record progression
- Sport in Ethiopia

== Sources ==
- Benyo, Richard; Henderson, Joe (2002). Running Encyclopedia. Human Kinetics. pp. 36–37. ISBN 978-0-7360-3734-1. OCLC 47665415.
- Giacomini, Romolo; Vignolini, Enrico; Baggio, Elena (1960). Garroni, Marcello (ed.). The Games of the XVII Olympiad, Rome 1960: The Official Report of the Organizing Committee (PDF). Vol. 2. Translated by Byatt, Edwin. Rome: Colombo Printing. OCLC 17938690. Archived from the original (PDF) on October 2, 2013.
- Judah, Tim (2008). Bikila: Ethiopia's Barefoot Olympian. London: Reportage Press. ISBN 978-0-9558302-1-1. OCLC 310218562.
- Maraniss, David (2008). Rome 1960: The Olympics That Changed the World. New York: Simon and Schuster. ISBN 9781416534075. OCLC 214066042.
- Martin, David E.; Gynn, Roger W. H. (2000). The Olympic Marathon. Champaign, IL: Human Kinetics. ISBN 978-0-88011-969-6. OCLC 42823784.
- Pitsiladis, Yannis; Wang, Guan; Wolfarth, Bernd (March 23, 2011). "Genomics of Aerobic Capacity and Endurance Performance: Clinical Implications". In Pescatello, Linda S.; Roth, Stephen M. (eds.). Exercise Genomics. Springer Science & Business Media. ISBN 978-1-60761-355-8.
- Rambali, Paul (2006). Barefoot Runner: The Life of Marathon Champion Abebe Bikila. London: Serpent's Tail. ISBN 1846686539. OCLC 068263333.

Records
Preceded by (Soviet Union) Sergei Popov	Men's Marathon World Record Holder; September 10, 1960 – February 17, 1963	Succeeded by (Japan) Toru Terasawa
Preceded by (United Kingdom) Basil Heatley	Men's Marathon World Record Holder; October 21, 1964 – June 12, 1965	Succeeded by (Japan) Morio Shigematsu
