= David John Dodds =

English athlete (1930–2021)

David John Dodds (1930–2021) was a British marathoner and jockey.

== Biography ==
David John Dodds was born in Sunderland, County Durham in 1930. In his late teens and early twenties (having trained as a fitter and turner, losing two of his fingers in the process) he became a well-known figure in local athletics before emigrating to Southern Rhodesia in 1954.

The following year he participated in the South African Marathon Championships and came second to Jan Barnard. Moreover, he ran in the gruelling Comrades Marathon, a 90 km (56 mi) event between the cities of Pietermaritzburg and Durban, and came fourth of 92 entrants. Dodds' time was 6 hours, 25 minutes and 15 seconds and he won the novices' trophy, an award given to the fastest first time entrant. Of the race he commented: "The downhills bothered me more than the uphills. My legs became so jarred that I thought I would not be able to finish."

Dodds later gave up athletics, having participated in the 1958 British Empire and Commonwealth Games, and became a successful amateur jockey. He won over 50 races, including the Rhodesian Grand National in 1965 when he rode Tempelhof, owned by Sir Henry Grattan-Bellew. In 1974 he returned to Sunderland, accompanied by his wife Natalie (née Crampton) and three sons. Later he divided his time between Sunderland and a residence near Alicante, Spain. Dodds died in Sunderland in 2021.
