= Alastair Wood =

Scottish athlete

Personal information
- Nationality: British (Scottish)
- Born: 13 January 1933 Elgin, Moray, Scotland
- Died: 2 January 2003 Aberdeen, Scotland

Sport
- Sport: Athletics
- Events: Long-distance, marathon
- Club: Oxford University AC; Aberdeen AAC; Achilles Club; Shettleston Harriers

Alastair James Wood (13 January 1933 – 2 January 2003) was a track and field athlete from Scotland who competed at the 1958 British Empire and Commonwealth Games and the 1962 British Empire and Commonwealth Games (now Commonwealth Games).

== Biography ==
Wood was educated at Elgin Academy, Moray and studied at the University of Aberdeen and the University of Oxford. By virtue of attending Oxford, he was a member of the Achilles Club and won their prestigious gold medal. Wood was also a member of the Shettleston Harriers.

He represented the Scottish Empire and Commonwealth Games team at the 1958 British Empire Games in Cardiff, Wales, participating in two events, the 3 miles race and the 6 miles race.

Four years later he represented the Scottish Empire and Commonwealth Games team again at the 1962 British Empire Games in Perth, Australia, participating in one event, the marathon race.

Wood was twice runner-up in the AAA Championships in 1962 behind Brian Kilby at Welwyn Garden City and in 1967 at Nuneaton in a Scottish podium clean sweep.

He continued racing over the marathon distance until September 1985 and won the Scottish Marathon Championship in 1962, 1964, 1965, 1967, 1968 and 1972.
