= Rik Clerckx =

Belgian long-distance runner

Personal information
- Full name: Henricus Stephanus Clerckx
- Nationality: Belgian
- Born: 31 July 1936
- Died: 19 December 1985 (aged 49)

Sport
- Sport: Long-distance running
- Event: 5000 metres

Henricus "Rik" Stephanus Clerckx (31 August 1936 – 19 December 1985) was a Belgian long-distance runner. He competed in the men's 5000 metres and men's 10000 metres at the 1964 Summer Olympics.
