= John Merriman (athlete) =

British long-distance runner

Personal information
- Nationality: British (Welsh/English)
- Born: 27 June 1936 Watford, England
- Died: 30 September 1999 (aged 63) Highworth, England
- Height: 171 cm (5 ft 7 in)
- Weight: 60 kg (132 lb)

Sport
- Sport: Athletics
- Event: Long-distance running / cross-country
- Club: Watford Harriers
Medal record
Representing (Wales)
Commonwealth Games
Silver medal – second place	1958 Cardiff	Men's 6 miles
Bronze medal – third place	1962 Perth	Men's 6 miles

John Linden Merriman (27 June 1936 – 30 September 1999) was a British long-distance runner, who competed at the 1960 Summer Olympics.

== Biography ==
Merriman was a member of the Watford Athletics Club and represented the 1958 Welsh team at the 1958 British Empire and Commonwealth Games in Cardiff, Wales, where he participated in two events; the three mile race and 6 miles event and won the silver medal.

At the 1960 Olympic Games in Rome, Merriman competed in the men's 10,000 metres.

A second Commonwealth Games appearance ensued when he represented the 1962 Welsh team at the 1962 British Empire and Commonwealth Games in Perth, Australia, where he participated in the 6 miles race, winning a bronze medal.

Merriman also competed in cross-country events.
