= Rhadi Ben Abdesselam =

Moroccan long-distance runner (1929–2000)

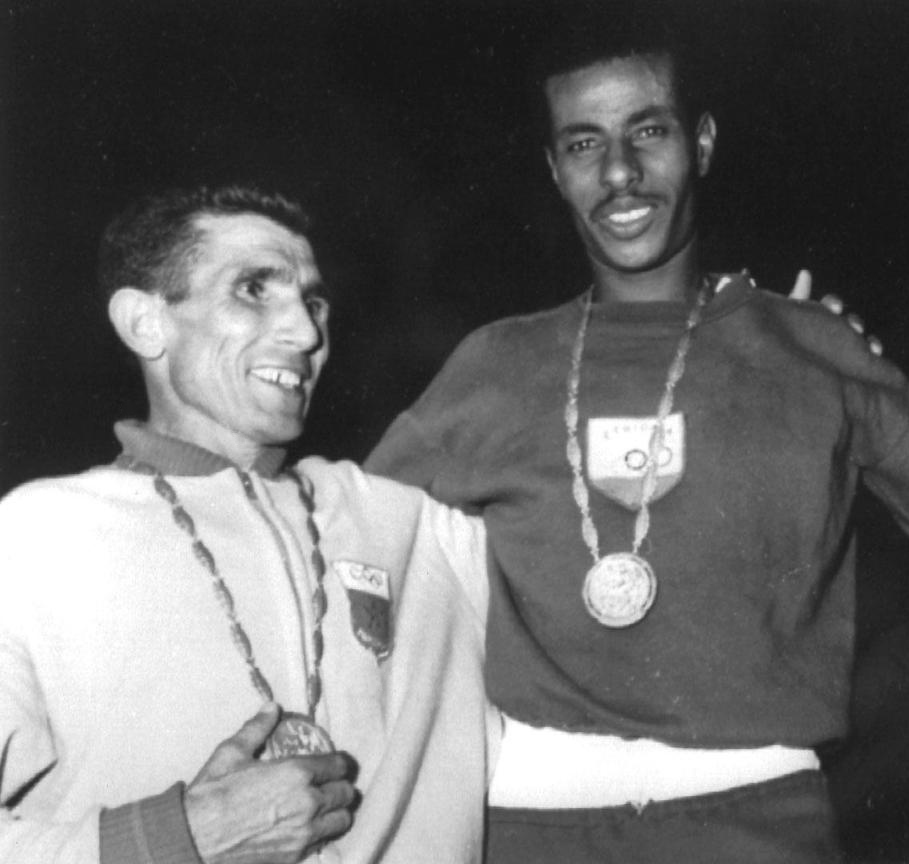
- Rhadi Ben Abdesselam (left) and Abebe Bikila at the 1960 Olympics

Personal information
- Nationality: Moroccan
- Born: 28 February 1929 in Ksar es Souk, Morocco
- Died: 4 October 2000 (aged 71) Fez, Morocco
- Height: 180 cm (5 ft 11 in)
- Weight: 65 kg (143 lb)

Sport
- Sport: Athletics
- Events: 10,000 m, marathon

Achievements and titles
- Personal bests: 10,000 m – 29:20.8 (1960); Marathon – 2:15:41.6 (1960)
Medal record
Representing Morocco
Olympic Games
Silver medal – second place	1960 Rome	Marathon
International Cross Country Championships
Gold medal – first place	1960 Hamilton Park	Individual

Rhadi Ben Abdesselam (Arabic: راضي بن عبد السلام; 28 February 1929 – 4 October 2000) was a Moroccan long-distance runner. He competed at the 1960 Olympics in the marathon and 10,000 meters events.

He also ran in the International Cross Country Championships in 1958–1963. In March 1960, he and Belgium's Gaston Roelants quickly broke away from the field, and he became the first African athlete to win the individual gold medal in that event, defeating Roelants by 40 yards.

On 8 September 1960, he finished in 14th place in the finals-only 10,000 meters, in 29:32.0, almost a minute behind the winner, the Soviet Union's Pyotr Bolotnikov, who broke the Olympic record for the event.

Just two days later, Ben Abdesselam started the marathon. The blazing pace that he set for the first 20 kilometers, running with the barefoot Abebe Bikila of Ethiopia, provided the impetus for Bikila's eventual world record. The pair had dispatched the rest of the field by 25 kilometers, and they stayed stride-for-stride until the final 500 meters, with Ben Abdesselam finishing second in 2:15:41.6, 25.4 seconds behind Bikila, whose time of 2:15:16.2 was a mere 8/10ths of a second faster than Sergei Popov's record of 2:15:17.0, set in 1958. Perhaps unsurprisingly, this is still the smallest margin by which a world marathon record has ever been broken.

Ironically, Bikila had been advised to watch out for Ben Abdesselam, but the latter wore his 10,000-meter competition number in the marathon, so Bikila was unaware of the identity of his competitor. Popov finished fifth in Rome, two minutes behind New Zealand's Barry Magee, who took the bronze medal.

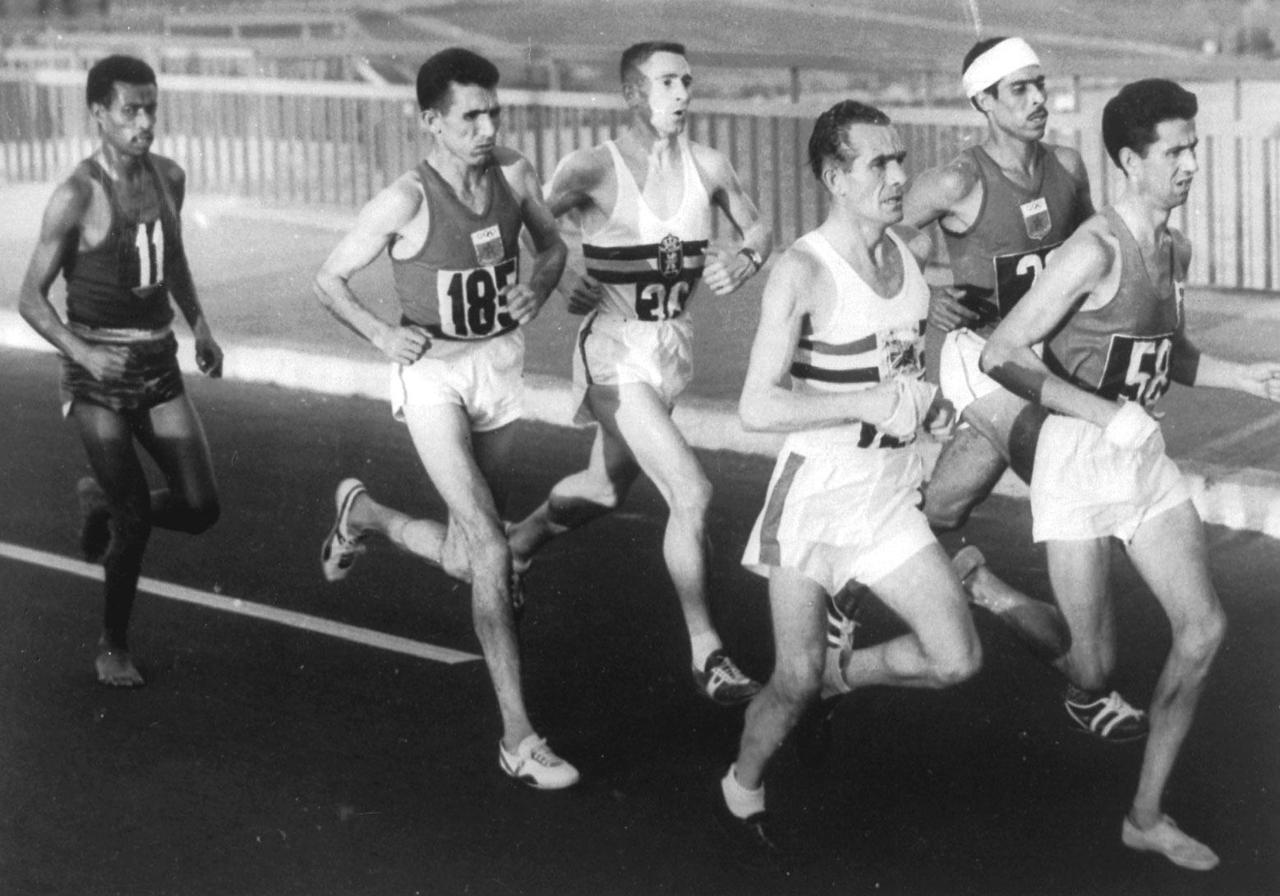
The 1960 Olympic marathon's lead pack, near the 10 km (6 mi) mark, with eventual winner Abebe Bikila (#11), following Ireland's Bertie Messitt (#58), Ben Abdesselam's teammate Bakir Benaïssa (wearing headband), Great Britain's Arthur Keily (#46), Belgium's Aurèle Vandendriessche (#36), and Ben Abdesselam (#185).
