= Hamoud Ameur =

French long-distance runner

Mouhamed Ameur (born 6 January 1932) is a French former long-distance runner who competed in the 1960 Summer Olympics. He was born in Mahelma, Algeria.
