= Stan Eldon =

British cross country runner (born 1936)

Stan Eldon MBE
Personal information
- Nationality: British (English)
- Born: 1 May 1936 (age 90) Windsor, Berkshire, England

Sport
- Sport: Athletics
- Event: Cross country/long distance
- Club: Windsor and Eton AC
Medal record
Men's athletics
Representing England
International Cross Country Championships
Gold medal – first place	1958 Cardiff	Cross Country

Stanley Edward Eldon (born 1 May 1936) is a retired British cross country runner. Eldon is notable for winning the International Cross Country Championships held in Cardiff in 1958. He was awarded his MBE for his work in setting up the Reading half-marathon.

== Biography ==
Eldon was inspired to become a runner after viewing a film of the 1948 Olympics and joined Eton Athletics Club (as it was called at the time). In 1956 he ran a junior World Best of 14 minutes 19 seconds over 3 miles. As an adult he came to note as an aggressive front runner.

Eldon finished second behind George Knight in the 6 miles event at the 1957 AAA Championships before he became both the British 3 miles champion and British 6 miles champion, after winning the British AAA Championships titles at the 1958 AAA Championships.

He was selected for the England athletics team at the 1958 British Empire and Commonwealth Games in Cardiff, Wales.

In 1958 he won the International Cross Country Championships in a time of 46 minutes 29 seconds beating Alain Mimoun and Frank Sando into second and third respectively. That same year Eldon won the inaugural Nos Galan road race, and was the mystery runner in the race in 1964.

Eldon retained his 6 miles title at the 1959 AAA Championships.
