= Paul Genève =

French long-distance runner

Personal information
- Nationality: French
- Born: 30 July 1925 Isère, France
- Died: 3 December 2017 (aged 92)

Sport
- Sport: Long-distance running
- Event: Marathon

Paul Genève (30 July 1925 – 3 December 2017) was a French long-distance runner. He competed in the marathon at the 1960 Summer Olympics.
