= Frank Sando =

British long-distance runner (1931–2012)

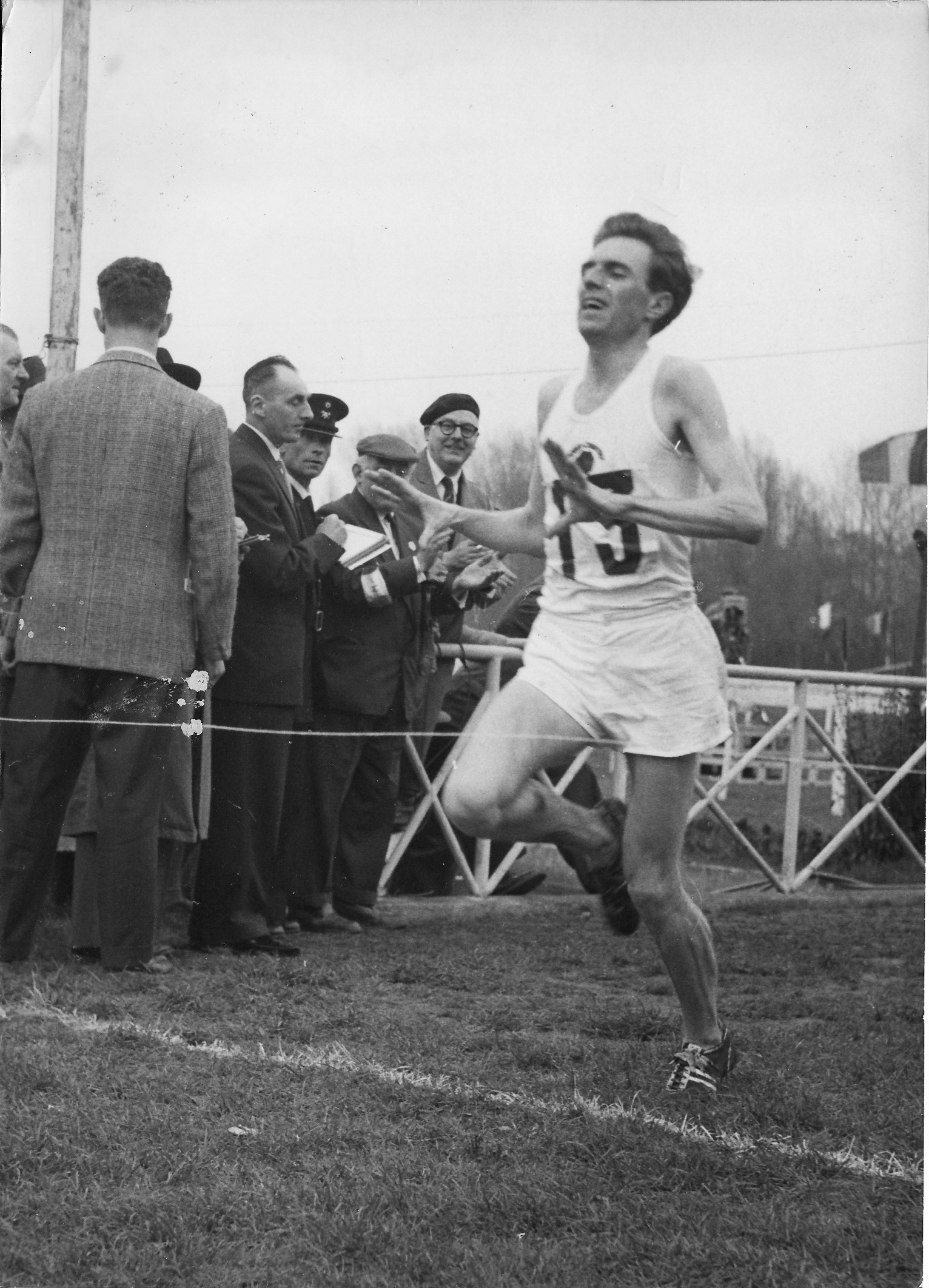
- Sando winning the International Cross Country Championship in Belgium, 1957.

Personal information
- Nationality: British (English)
- Born: 14 March 1931 Maidstone, England
- Died: 12 October 2012 (aged 81)
- Height: 171 cm (5 ft 7 in)
- Weight: 52 kg (115 lb)

Sport
- Sport: Athletics
- Event: long-distance
- Club: Aylesford Paper Mills SC
Medal record
Men's athletics
Representing Great Britain
European Championships
| Bronze medal – third place | 1954 Bern | 10,000 m |
Representing England
British Empire and Commonwealth Games
| Silver medal – second place | 1954 Vancouver | 6 miles |
| Bronze medal – third place | 1954 Vancouver | 3 miles |
International Cross Country Championships
| Gold medal – first place | 1955 San Sebastian | Men's race |
| Gold medal – first place | 1957 Waregem | Men's race |
| Silver medal – second place | 1953 Paris | Men's race |
| Silver medal – second place | 1956 Belfast | Men's race |
| Silver medal – second place | 1959 Lisbon | Men's race |
| Bronze medal – third place | 1958 Cardiff | Men's race |

Frank Dennis Sando (14 March 1931 – 13 October 2012) was a British long-distance runner. A two-time winner at the International Cross Country Championships (1955, 1957), Sando represented Great Britain in two consecutive Summer Olympic Games.

== Early life ==
Sando was born on 31 March 1931 in Maidstone, to Ernest and Maria Sando. Attending Maidstone Grammar School, Sando first began his involvement in athletics at sixteen, breaking the school mile record. Simultaneously, he began an amateur career at Maidstone Harriers, winning the Kent County Junior Cross-Country Championship in 1948 and the Kent Youth Cross-Country Championship in 1949. He finished fourth in the English Youth Cross-Country Championship in 1948 and 1949.

Having left school, Sando undertook National Service in October 1949, joining the army. In 1951, he broke the Army three-mile record which had stood for 23 years, having previously that year won the Inter-Services Cross-Country Championship.

== Senior career ==
Leaving the army in 1951, he began working for the Reed Paper Group in Aylesford, Kent, where he met his future wife Sybil Page. After resigning from Maidstone Harriers, Sando joined the Paper Group's athletics club, juggling work, professional examinations, family commitments and his athletic career. It was at this time that he gained the nickname: the "Maidstone Mudlark".

The following year, 1952, he finished fifth in the English National Cross Country Championships and ninth in the International Cross-Country Championships. Over the next eight years Sando maintained a record of finishing in the top eight positions in the International Championships, as well as an extended period of captaincy of the British team over seven years. In 1952 he was called up to represent Great Britain at the Helsinki Olympic Games, in the 10,000 m. It was in this event that he famously lost a shoe early in the race but, continuing on with one bare foot, he still managed to finish in fifth position. Also in 1952, he finished third behind Gordon Pirie in the 6 miles event at the 1952 AAA Championships. He would finish runner-up in the AAAs every year from 1953 to 1956.

In 1954 Sando represented the English team in the British Empire and Commonwealth Games, where he finished second in the six miles to Peter Driver and third in the three miles to Chris Chataway. Later in that year he finished third in the 10,000 m in the European Athletics Championships in Berne, Switzerland – which was won by Emil Zátopek. He married Sybil Page in September of the same year.

Sando went on to win the International Cross-Country Championships in San Sebastien, Spain in 1955. In 1956, after returning from injury, he finished second in the International Cross-Country Championships. Running well in the domestic track season of 1956, Sando was selected to represent Great Britain in the 10,000 m in the Olympics of that year, where he finished in tenth position. He later described this as the greatest disappointment of his athletic career, and it was the final time he represented his country on the track. In 1957 Sando won the National Cross-Country Championship at Parliament Hill Fields and the International Championships.

The International Championships of 1958 resulted in a 3rd-place finish for Sando and, in the two consecutive years, he finished 2nd and 8th in the same competition. However, in 1961 he failed to qualify for the national cross-country team. He subsequently decided to retire from serious athletics to concentrate on family commitments and further study, bringing to an end a long sporting career at the top of world athletics.

He was one of many signatories in a letter to The Times on 17 July 1958 opposing 'the policy of apartheid' in international sport and defending 'the principle of racial equality which is embodied in the Declaration of the Olympic Games'.

== Later life ==
After retiring from athletics, Sando studied at Birkbeck College and graduated with a degree in statistics in 1964. The following year he resigned from the Reeds Paper Group and joined the Civil Service. He retired from the Civil Service in 1991 as Chief Statistician.

Sando continued his involvement with athletics in an organisational capacity into his later years, having been President of Kent County Athletics Association in 1980 and 2003, as well as various other administrative roles within the county organisation. Subsequent to his presidency of KCAA, he continued to be involved in organising grass roots cross-country events. From 2007 to 2008, Sando served as President of the Old Maidstonian Society.

== Family and personal life ==
Sando was married to Sybil and the couple had two children – Lorraine and Andrew – and two grandchildren. Until his death in October 2012, Frank continued to live in Aylesford, Kent with his wife – within sight of the Aylesford Paper Mill training ground where his athletic career first began.
