= Ould Lamine Abdallah =

French long-distance runner (1929–2022)

Abdallah Ould Lamine Fares
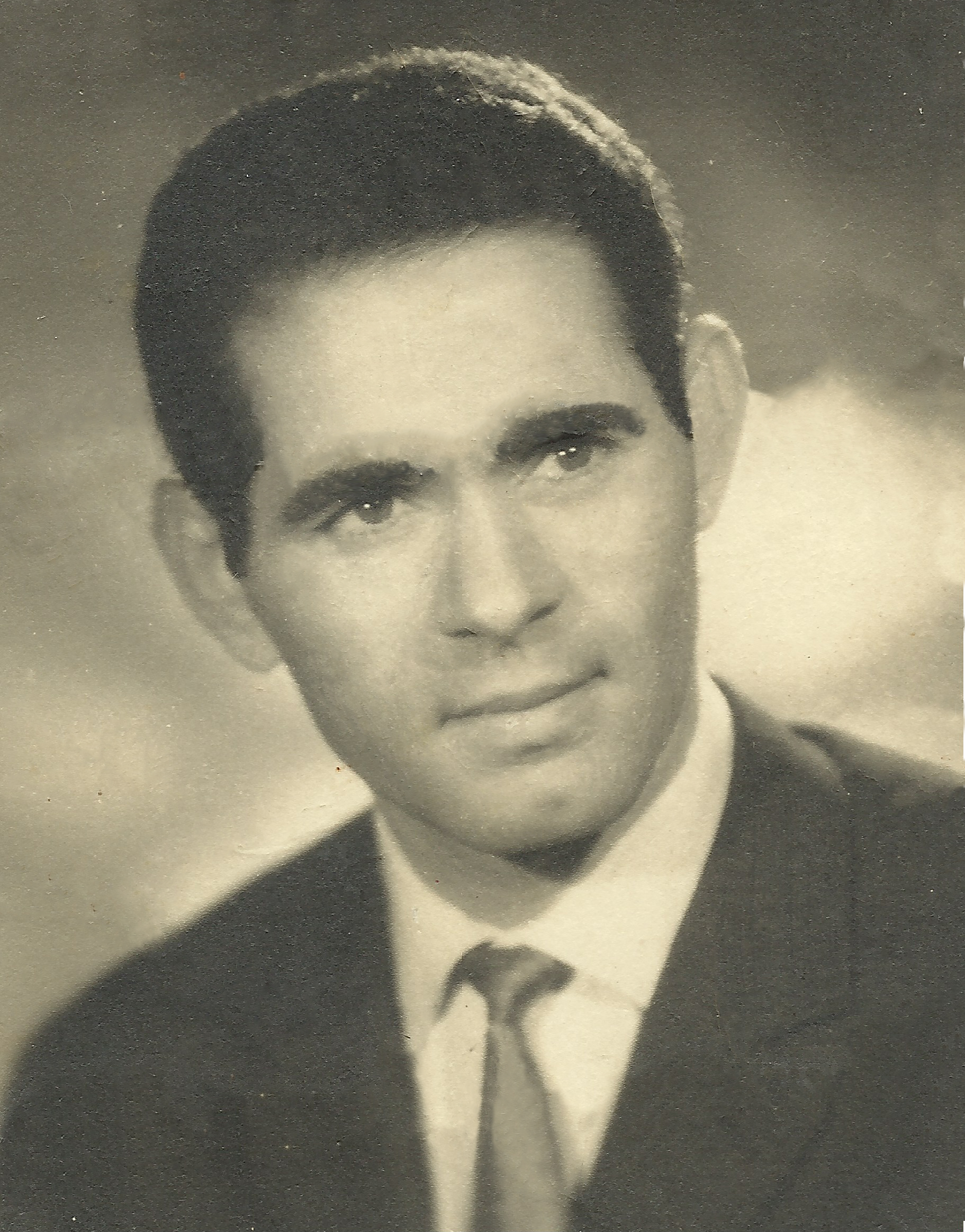
- Abdallah Ould Lamine
- Born: 1 January 1929; Nador, French Morocco
- Died: 13 February 2022 (aged 93); Rabat, Morocco
- Occupations: Retired Military Officer and long-distance runner
- Known for: Finalist in the 1952 Summer Olympics 4x World Military Cross Country Champion

Abdallah Ould Lamine Fares (1 January 1929 - 13 February 2022) was a Moroccan-French Military Officer and long-distance runner who competed in the 1952 Summer Olympics. He was also known for being 4 times World Champion at the World Military Cross Country Championships.

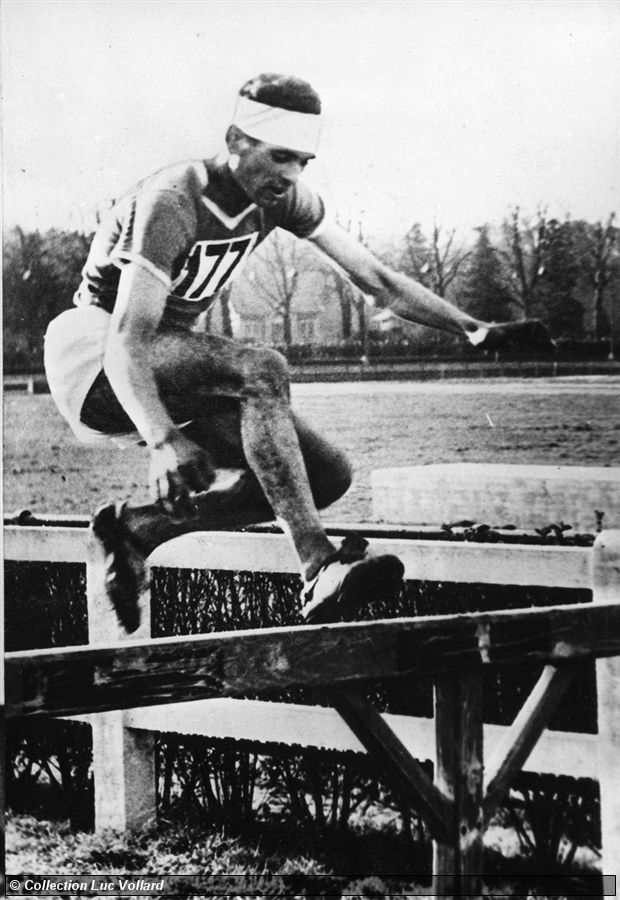
Abdallah Ould Lamine Fares

Edition	Year	Men's long race
Edition	Year	Individual
2nd	1949	Ould Lamine Abdallah (FRA)
5th	1953	Ould Lamine Abdallah (FRA)
6th	1955	Ould Lamine Abdallah (FRA)
7th	1956	Ould Lamine Abdallah (FRA)
