= Bertie Messitt =

Irish long-distance runner (1930–2012)

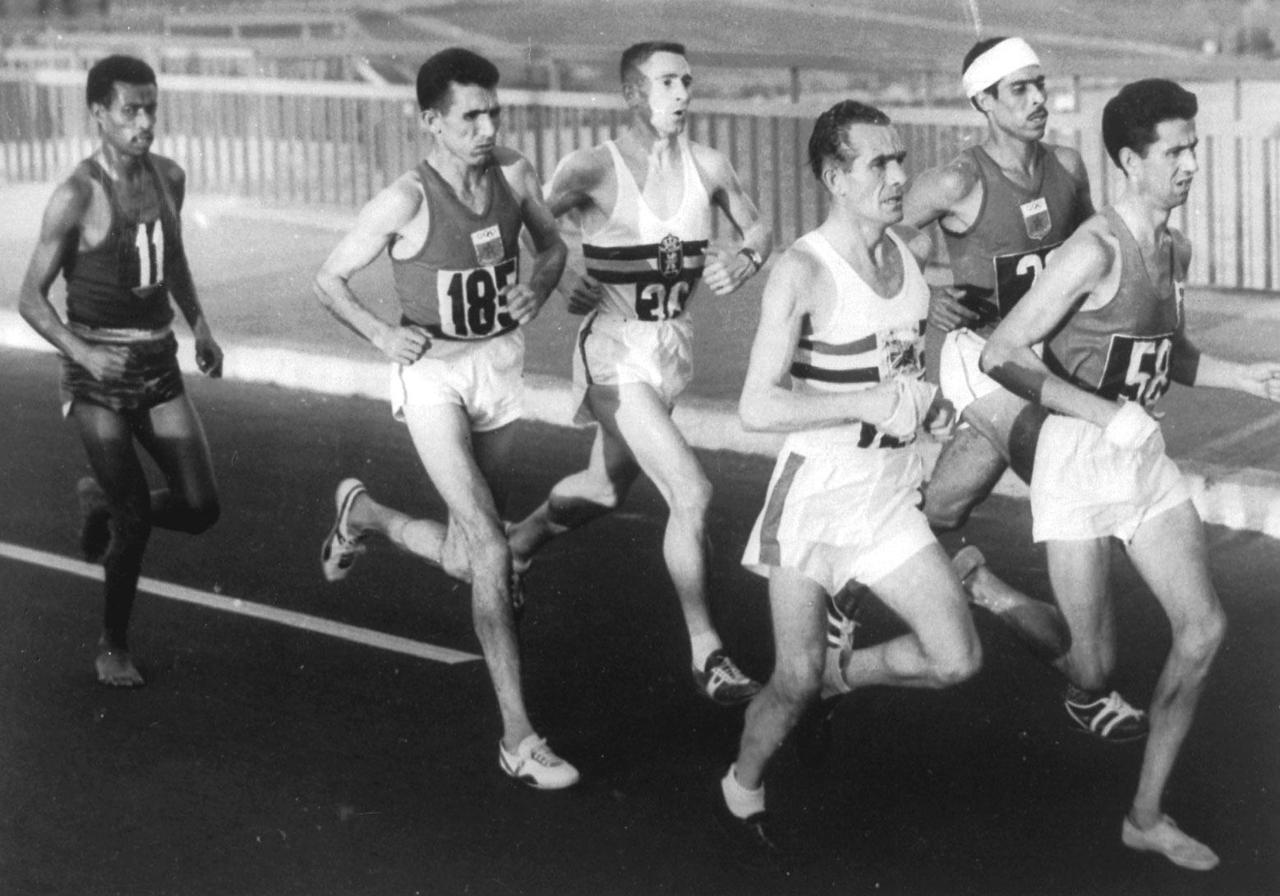
- The 1960 Olympic Marathon lead pack near the 10 km (6 mi) mark, Messitt (number 58) leading Bikila, Benaïssa, Keily, Vandendriessche (who dropped out) and ben Abdesselam.

Personal information
- Nationality: Irish
- Born: Albert John Messitt; 28 September 1930 Bray, Wicklow, Ireland
- Died: 18 February 2012 (aged 81) Shankill, Dublin, Ireland

Sport
- Sport: Long-distance running
- Event: Marathon
- Club: Donore

Bertie Messitt (28 September 1930 – 18 February 2012) was an Irish long-distance runner. He was educated in Saint Cronan's Boys' National School in Bray. A bus conductor, he won his fourth Irish cross country title in 1961. By the time he had ended his competitive career in 1966, he had recorded 16 Irish records, nine in 1958 alone: 13:44 for three miles, 14:14.8 for 5,000m, 49:33 for 10 miles. He finished 13th in the European Marathon Championships in Belgrade in 1962. His best marathon time, 2:25.39, was set in 1963. He won the Irish marathon championship in 1960, running 2:28:40, qualifying him for the Irish team in the marathon at the 1960 Summer Olympics.

For 12 miles, Bertie led the Olympic's lead pack at a blistering pace. It included Ethiopia's Abebe Bikila, running barefoot, who became the world record-breaking winner, Moroccans Rhadi Ben Abdesselam, the eventual runner up, and Bakir Benaïssa (8th place), as well as Belgium's Aurèle Vandendriessche, the Soviet Union's Sergei Popov, who lost his world record while finishing fifth, and Great Britain's Arthur Keily, who faded to 25th. Messitt, spent from his gallant effort, dropped out at 20 miles.
