= Athletics at the 1912 Summer Olympics – Men's 10,000 metres =

Men's 10,000 metres at the Games of the V Olympiad
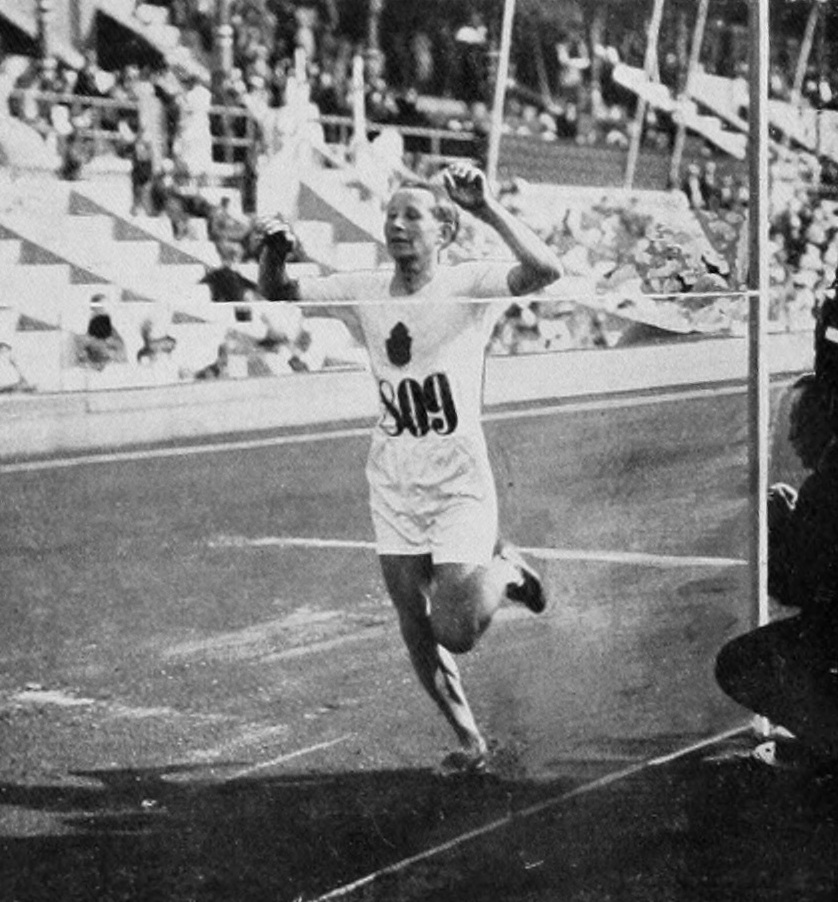
- Kolehmainen winning the final.
- Venue: Stockholm Olympic Stadium
- Dates: July 7, 1912 (semifinals); July 8, 1912 (final)
- Competitors: 30 from 13 nations

Medalists
1st place, gold medalist(s)		Hannes Kolehmainen	Finland
2nd place, silver medalist(s)		Lewis Tewanima	United States
3rd place, bronze medalist(s)		Albin Stenroos	Finland

The men's 10,000 metres was a track and field athletics event held as part of the Athletics at the 1912 Summer Olympics programme. It was the debut of the event, which along with the 5000 metres replaced the 5 mile race held at the 1908 Summer Olympics. The competition was held on Sunday, July 7, 1912, and on Monday, July 8, 1912. Thirty runners from 13 nations competed. NOCs could enter up to 12 athletes.

== Records ==
These were the standing world and Olympic records (in minutes) prior to the 1912 Summer Olympics.

World record	30:58.8	(France) Jean Bouin	Colombes (FRA)	November 16, 1911
Olympic record	-	none	-	-

Hannes Kolehmainen, in winning the first semifinal, set the Olympic record at 33:49.0. It lasted until the next race, in which the time was beat by Len Richardson. Kolehmainen took back the record with a time of 31:20.8 in the final.

== Results ==
=== Semifinals ===
All semi-finals were held on Sunday, July 7, 1912.

==== Semifinal 1 ====
Place	Athlete	Time	Qual.
1	Hannes Kolehmainen (FIN)	33:49.0 OR	QF
2	Joe Keeper (CAN)	33:58.8	QF
3	Gaston Heuet (FRA)	34:50.0	QF
4	John Eke (SWE)	34:55.8	QF
5	Ernest Glover (GBR)	35:12.2	QF
6	Albert Öberg (SWE)	35:45.0	
—	Harry Hellawell (USA)	Did not finish	
—	William Kramer (USA)	Did not finish	
—	George Lee (GBR)	Did not finish	
—	Mikhail Nikolsky (RUS)	Did not finish	
—	Vladimír Penc (BOH)	Did not finish	
—	Charles Ruffell (GBR)	Did not finish	

==== Semifinal 2 ====
Place	Athlete	Time	Qual.
1	Len Richardson (RSA)	32:30.3 OR	QF
2	Lewis Tewanima (USA)	32:31.4	QF
3	Mauritz Carlsson (SWE)	33:06.2	QF
4	Albin Stenroos (FIN)	33:28.4	QF
5	Alfonso Orlando (ITA)	33:44.6	QF
6	Alfonso Sánchez (CHI)		
7	Brynolf Larsson (SWE)		
—	Bror Fock (SWE)	Did not finish	
—	Frederick Hibbins (GBR)	Did not finish	
—	Thomas Humphreys (GBR)	Did not finish	
—	Gregor Vietz (GER)	Did not finish	

==== Semifinal 3 ====
Place	Athlete	Time	Qual.
1	Tatu Kolehmainen (FIN)	32:47.8	QF
2	William Scott (GBR)	32:55.2	QF
3	Louis Scott (USA)	34:14.2	QF
4	Martin Persson (SWE)	34:18.6	QF
5	Hugh Maguire (USA)	34:32.0	QF
—	George Hill (ANZ)	Did not finish	
—	George Wallach (GBR)	Did not finish	

=== Final ===
The final was held on Monday, July 8, 1912.

Place	Athlete	Time
1	Hannes Kolehmainen (FIN)	31:20.8 OR
2	Lewis Tewanima (USA)	32:06.6
3	Albin Stenroos (FIN)	32:21.8
4	Joe Keeper (CAN)	32:36.2
5	Alfonso Orlando (ITA)	33:31.2
—	Mauritz Carlsson (SWE)	Did not finish
—	Tatu Kolehmainen (FIN)	Did not finish
—	Hugh Maguire (USA)	Did not finish
—	Len Richardson (RSA)	Did not finish
—	Louis Scott (USA)	Did not finish
—	William Scott (GBR)	Did not finish
—	John Eke (SWE)	Did not start
—	Ernest Glover (GBR)	Did not start
—	Gaston Heuet (FRA)	Did not start
—	Martin Persson (SWE)	Did not start

== Sources ==
- Bergvall, Erik, ed. (1913). The Official Report of the Olympic Games of Stockholm 1912. Translated by Adams-Ray, Edward. Stockholm: Wahlström & Widstrand.
- Wudarski, Pawel (1999). "Wyniki Igrzysk Olimpijskich" (in Polish).
