= Athletics at the 1912 Summer Olympics – Men's team cross country =

Athletics at the Olympics

Men's team cross country at the Games of the V Olympiad
- Venue: Stockholm Olympic Stadium
- Date: July 15, 1912
- Competitors: 41 from 6 nations

Medalists
1st place, gold medalist(s)		Hjalmar Andersson; John Eke; Josef Ternström	Sweden
2nd place, silver medalist(s)		Jalmari Eskola; Hannes Kolehmainen; Albin Stenroos	Finland
3rd place, bronze medalist(s)		Ernest Glover; Frederick Hibbins; Thomas Humphreys	Great Britain

The men's team cross country was a track and field athletics event held as part of the Athletics at the 1912 Summer Olympics programme. It was the first appearance of the event. The competition was held on Monday, July 15, 1912.

Forty-one runners from six nations competed. NOCs could enter up to 12 athletes.

== Results ==
The first three runners for each nation to finish in the individual cross country race counted towards the team results. Their placings were summed, and the team with the lowest sum won. Of the 10 nations that sent cross country runners, 6 had at least 3 runners (Austria, France, Germany, and South Africa were the four that did not; they have only one runner each). The United States had only 2 of its 5 runners finish, so did not make a valid team score.

Place	Team	Score	Total
Final
1	Sweden		10
1	Hjalmar Andersson	2	10
1	John Eke	3	10
1	Josef Ternström	5	10
	Brynolf Larsson	9	
	Johan Sundkvist	10	
	Klas Lundström	13	
	Bror Fock	17	
	Gustav Carlén	21	
	Edvin Hellgren	DNF	
	John Klintberg	DNF	
	Axel Lindahl	DNF	
	Henrik Nordström	DNF	
2	Finland		11
2	Hannes Kolehmainen	1	11
2	Jalmari Eskola	4	11
2	Albin Stenroos	6	11
	Ville Kyrönen	7	
	Viljam Johansson	11	
	Väinö Heikkilä	25	
	Efraim Harju	DNF	
	Aarne Lindholm	DNF	
3	Great Britain		49
3	Frederick Hibbins	15	49
3	Ernest Glover	16	49
3	Thomas Humphreys	18	49
	Joe Cottrill	DNF	
	William Scott	DNF	
4	Norway		61
4	Olaf Hovdenak	19	61
4	Parelius Finnerud	20	61
4	Johannes Andersen	22	61
	Nils Dahl	DNF	
5	Denmark		63
5	Lauritz Christiansen	14	63
5	Viggo Petersen	23	63
5	Gerhard Topp	26	63
	Steen Rasmussen	28	
	Holger Baden	DNF	
	Fritz Danild	DNF	
	Karl Julius Jensen	DNF	
—	United States		—
—	Harry Hellawell	12	—
—	Louis Scott	24	—
—	Tell Berna	DNF	—
	George Bonhag	DNF	
	William Kramer	DNF	
