= 1911 International Cross Country Championships =

- Organisers: ICCU
- Edition: 9th
- Date: 25 March
- Host city: Caerleon, Monmouthshire, Wales
- Venue: Caerleon Racecourse
- Events: 1
- Distances: 10 mi (16.1 km)
- Participation: 45 athletes from 5 nations

The 1911 International Cross Country Championships was held in Caerleon, Wales, at the Caerleon Racecourse on 25 March 1911. A report on the event was given in the Glasgow Herald.

Complete results, medallists, and the results of British athletes were published.

== Medallists ==
Event	Gold		Silver		Bronze	
Individual
Men; 10 mi (16.1 km)	Jean Bouin; France	54:07.6	Harry Baldwin; England	54:22	George Wallach; Scotland	54:44
Team
Men	England	32	Ireland	108	Scotland	121

== Individual Race Results ==
=== Men's (10 mi / 16.1 km) ===
Rank	Athlete	Nationality	Time
1st place, gold medalist(s)	Jean Bouin	France	54:07.6
2nd place, silver medalist(s)	Harry Baldwin	England	54:22
3rd place, bronze medalist(s)	George Wallach	Scotland	54:44
4	William Scott	England	55:01
5	Frederick Hibbins	England	55:26
6	Christopher Vose	England	55:36
7	Ernest Glover	England	55:44
8	Alfred Clemes	England	55:47
9	Sammy Welding	England	56:00
10	Puck O'Neill	Ireland	56:07
11	Jacques Keyser	France	56:24
12	Samuel Raynes	England	56:26
13	John Daly (Note: not to be confused with John Daly (1880-1969))	Ireland	56:31
14	Sam Watt	Scotland	56:49
15	Sid Wilson	Wales	56:59
16	Paul Lizandier	France	57:17
17	P.J. Clarke	Ireland	57:18
18	Ernest Paul	Wales	57:21
19	P.J. McGuinness	Ireland	57:38
20	Will Herring	Wales	57:47
21	Albert Turner	England	57:50
22	Angus Kerr	Scotland	57:51
23	Frank Ryder	Ireland	57:53
24	Tom Johnston	Scotland	57:55
25	F.J. Isles	Wales	57:57
26	Jack Smith	Ireland	58:09
27	Alex Mann	Scotland	58:13
28	Louis Pauteix	France	58:22
29	Paul Kelly	Ireland	58:24
30	T. Elsmore	Wales	58:43
31	Alex McPhee	Scotland	59:06
32	F. Guthrie	Ireland	59:07
33	J.D. Hughes	Scotland	59:09
34	Jack Meyrick	Wales	59:11
35	James Duffy	Scotland	59:48
36	Llewellyn Lloyd	Wales	1:00:01
37	Gustave Lauvaux	France	1:00:14
38	Fernand Lamorille	France	1:01:43
39	Edgar Ballon	France	1:01:44
40	Jean Capelle	France	1:02:21
41	Lucien Fremont	France	1:02:21
—	Edgar Stead	Wales	DNF
—	John Templeman	Scotland	DNF
—	Jack Miles	Wales	DNF
—	Jim Kerr	Ireland	DNF

== Team Results ==
=== Men's ===
Rank	Country	Team	Points
1	England	Harry Baldwin; William Scott; Frederick Hibbins; Christopher Vose; Ernest Glover; Alfred Clemes	32
2	Ireland	Puck O'Neill; John Daly; P.J. Clarke; P.J. McGuinness; Frank Ryder; Jack Smith	108
3	Scotland	George Wallach; Sam Watt; Angus Kerr; Tom Johnston; Alex Mann; Alex McPhee	121
4	France	Jean Bouin; Jacques Keyser; Paul Lizandier; Louis Pauteix; Gustave Lauvaux; Fernand Lamorille	131
5	Wales	Sid Wilson; Ernest Paul; Will Herring; F.J. Isles; T. Elsmore; Jack Meyrick	142

== Participation ==
An unofficial count yields the participation of 45 athletes from 5 countries.

- England (9)
- France (9)
- Ireland (9)
- Scotland (9)
- Wales (9)

== See also ==
- 1911 in athletics (track and field)
