= 1912 International Cross Country Championships =

- Organisers: ICCU
- Edition: 10th
- Date: 30 March
- Host city: Edinburgh, Lothian, Scotland
- Venue: Saughton Public Park
- Events: 1
- Distances: 10 mi (16.1 km)
- Participation: 44 athletes from 5 nations

The 1912 International Cross Country Championships was held in Edinburgh, Scotland, at the Saughton Public Park on 30 March 1912. A report on the event was given in the Glasgow Herald.

Complete results, medalists, and the results of British athletes were published.

== Medalists ==
Event	Gold		Silver		Bronze	
Individual
Men; 10 mi (16.1 km)	Jean Bouin; France	51:46	William Scott; England	52:19	Frederick Hibbins; England	52:34
Team
Men	England	41	Scotland	88	Ireland	110

== Individual Race Results ==
=== Men's (10 mi / 16.1 km) ===
Rank	Athlete	Nationality	Time
1st place, gold medalist(s)	Jean Bouin	France	51:46
2nd place, silver medalist(s)	William Scott	England	52:19
3rd place, bronze medalist(s)	Frederick Hibbins	England	52:34
4	George Wallach	Scotland	52:51
5	Puck O'Neill	Ireland	53:07
6	Jacques Keyser	France	53:12
7	Ernest Glover	England	53:14
8	W.J. Tucker	England	53:20
9	James Murphy	Ireland	53:26
10	Fred Neaves	England	53:32
11	Christopher Vose	England	53:45
12	James Hughes	Ireland	53:57
13	J.D. Hughes	Scotland	54:01
14	G.R. Stephen	Scotland	54:05
15	Harry Hughes	Scotland	54:10
16	Edgar Davies	Wales	54:11
17	Ernest Paul	Wales	54:25
18	Jack Miles	Wales	54:26
19	Charles Ruffell	England	54:27
20	Tom Jack	Scotland	54:28
21	Gaston Heuet	France	54:34
22	George MacKenzie	Scotland	54:40
23	H. Holbrook	England	54:44
24	Gustave Lauvaux	France	54:49
25	Alexander Loch	Scotland	55:15
26	J.J Mooney	Ireland	55:30
27	F. Guthrie	Ireland	55:40
28	Angus Kerr	Scotland	55:43
29	Jack Meyrick	Wales	56:02
30	Lucien Fremont	France	56:10
31	Jack J. Martin	Ireland	56:18
32	W. Taylor	Wales	56:21
33	Bob Kerr	Ireland	56:40
34	Will Herring	Wales	56:45
35	Sydney Greenway	England	56:51
36	P.J. Clarke	Ireland	56:55
37	Louis Pauteix	France	56:56
39	W. Millard	Wales	57:35
40	P.J. McGuinness	Ireland	58:30
41	Jean-Marie-Joseph Roche	France	59:42
—	Georges Dumonteuil	France	DNF
—	Pierre Lalaimode	France	DNF
—	Sam Watt	Scotland	DNF
—	Sid Wilson	Wales	DNF

== Team Results ==
=== Men's ===
Rank	Country	Team	Points
1	England	William Scott; Frederick Hibbins; Ernest Glover; W.J. Tucker; Fred Neaves; Christopher Vose	41
2	Scotland	George Wallach; J.D. Hughes; G.R. Stephen; Harry Hughes; Tom Jack; George MacKenzie	88
3	Ireland	Puck O'Neill; James Murphy; James Hughes; J.J Mooney; F. Guthrie; Jack J. Martin	110
4	France	Jean Bouin; Jacques Keyser; Gaston Heuet; Gustave Lauvaux; Lucien Fremont; Louis Pauteix	119
5	Wales	Edgar Davies; Ernest Paul; Jack Miles; Jack Meyrick; W. Taylor; Will Herring	146

== Participation ==
An unofficial count yields the participation of 44 athletes from 5 countries.

- England (9)
- France (9)
- Ireland (9)
- Scotland (9)
- Wales (8)

== See also ==
- 1912 in athletics (track and field)
