= Athletics at the 1912 Summer Olympics – Men's individual cross country =

Athletics at the Olympics

Men's cross country at the Games of the V Olympiad
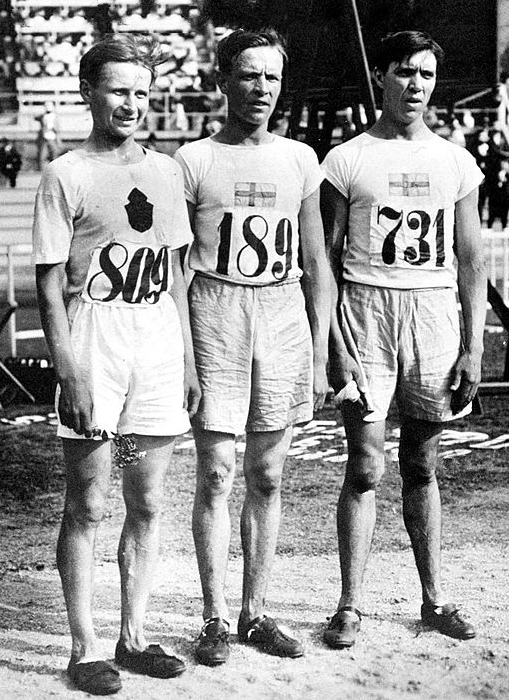
- Hannes Kolehmainen, Hjalmar Andersson and John Eke
- Venue: Stockholm Olympic Stadium
- Date: July 15, 1912
- Competitors: 45 from 9 nations

Medalists
1st place, gold medalist(s)		Hannes Kolehmainen	Finland
2nd place, silver medalist(s)		Hjalmar Andersson	Sweden
3rd place, bronze medalist(s)		John Eke	Sweden

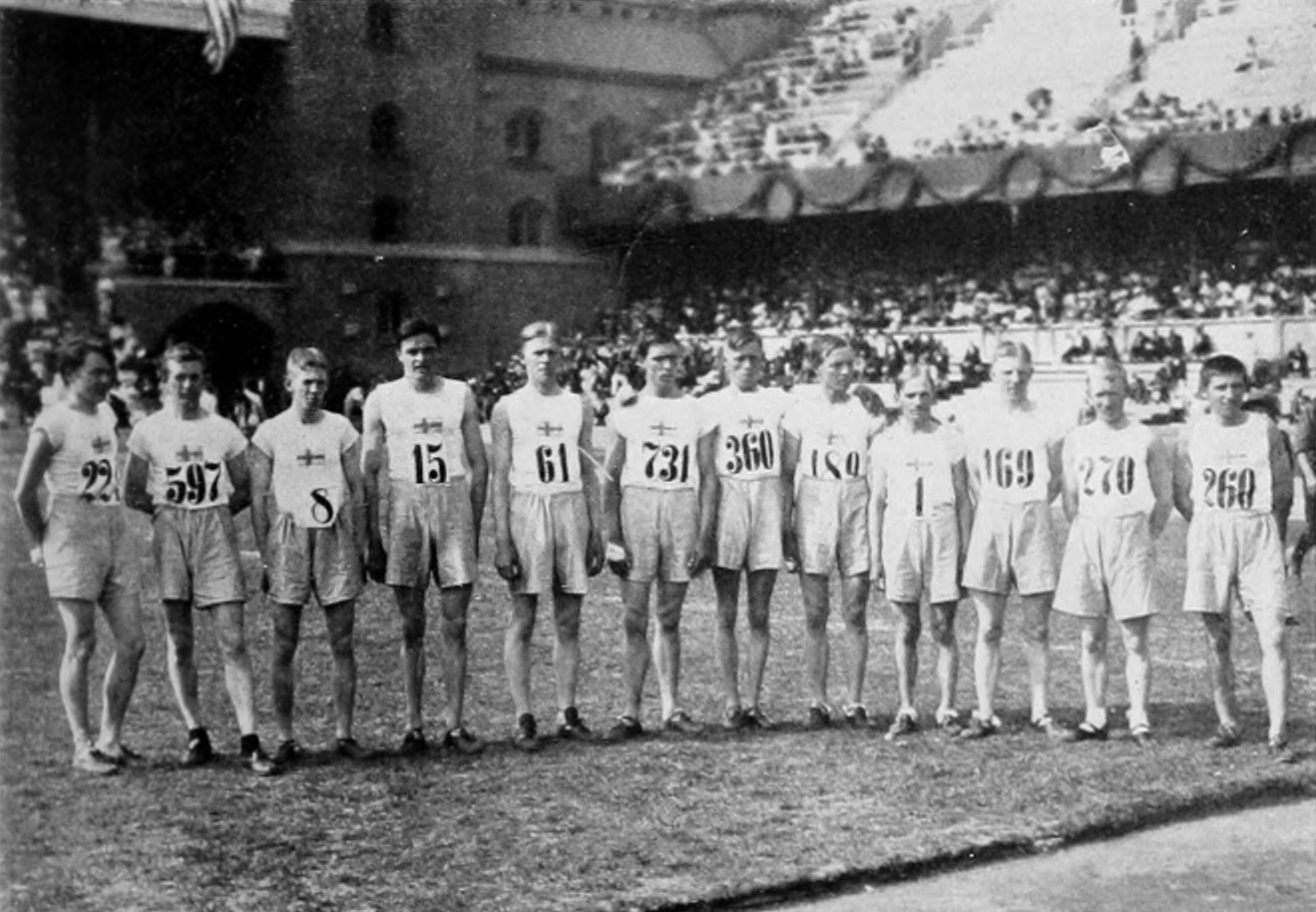
The Swedish competitors of the cross country race.

At the 1912 Summer Olympics, the men's individual cross country race was held as part of the athletics programme. It was the first appearance of the event. The competition was held on Monday, July 15, 1912. Forty-five runners from nine nations competed. NOCs could enter up to 12 athletes.

== Records ==
The course was about 12,000 metres long, and it was not revealed to competitors before the race started. The world best for a comparable distance 7.5-mile run was as follows:

World record	George Bonhag (USA)	39:08 4/5 (7.5 mi)	Woodside, Queens (Celtic Park)	6 November 1909
Olympic record	N/A			

== Results ==
The first three runners for each nation to finish in this race were also counted towards the team results.

Place	Athlete	Time
1	Hannes Kolehmainen (FIN)	45:11.6
2	Hjalmar Andersson (SWE)	45:44.8
3	John Eke (SWE)	46:37.6
4	Jalmari Eskola (FIN)	46:54.8
5	Josef Ternström (SWE)	47:07.1
6	Albin Stenroos (FIN)	47:23.4
7	Ville Kyrönen (FIN)	47:32.0
8	Len Richardson (RSA)	47:33.5
9	Brynolf Larsson (SWE)	47:37.4
10	Johan Sundkvist (SWE)	47:40.0
11	Viljam Johansson (FIN)	48:03.0
12	Harry Hellawell (USA)	48:12.0
13	Klas Lundström (SWE)	48:45.4
14	Lauritz Christiansen (DEN)	49:06.4
15	Frederick Hibbins (GBR)	49:18.2
16	Ernest Glover (GBR)	49:53.7
17	Bror Fock (SWE)	50:15.8
18	Thomas Humphreys (GBR)	50:28.0
19	Olaf Hovdenak (NOR)	50:40.8
20	Parelius Finnerud (NOR)	51:16.2
21	Gustav Carlén (SWE)	51:26.8
22	Johannes Andersen (NOR)	51:47.4
23	Viggo Petersen (DEN)	53:00.8
24	Louis Scott (USA)	53:51.4
25	Väinö Heikkilä (FIN)	54:08.0
26	Gerhard Topp (DEN)	54:24.9
27	Gregor Vietz (GER)	54:40.6
28	Steen Rasmussen (DEN)	55:27.0

There were 17 more competitors who did not finish the race.
