= Hellgren =

Hellgren is a Swedish surname. Notable people with the surname include:

- Claes Hellgren (born 1955), Swedish handball player
- Edvin Hellgren
- Jens Hellgren (born 1989), Swedish ice hockey player
- Martin Hellgren (born 1991), Swedish ice hockey player
