= Albert Mills =

Albert Mills may refer to:

- Al Mills (1910-1961), Canadian professional wrestler
- Albert Leopold Mills (1854–1916), United States Army Major General
- Bert Mills (1910–1984), Australian Australian rule footballer
- Bobby Mills (athlete) (1894–1964), British athlete
- Mosky Mills (1889–1972), English footballer
