= 1913 International Cross Country Championships =

- Organisers: ICCU
- Edition: 11th
- Date: 24 March
- Host city: Juvisy-sur-Orge, Île-de-France, France
- Venue: Port-Aviation
- Events: 1
- Distances: 10 mi (16.1 km)
- Participation: 36 athletes from 4 nations

The 1913 International Cross Country Championships was held at Port-Aviation (often called "Juvisy Airfield") in Viry-Châtillon, France, on 24 March 1913. A report on the event was given in the Glasgow Herald.

Complete results, medallists, and the results of British athletes were published.

== Medallists ==
Event	Gold		Silver		Bronze	
Individual
Men; 10 mi (16.1 km)	Jean Bouin; France	51:52.4	Ernest Glover; England	52:33	Jacques Keyser; France	53:10
Team
Men	England	38	France	61	Scotland	96

== Individual Race Results ==
=== Men's (10 mi / 16.1 km) ===
Rank	Athlete	Nationality	Time
1st place, gold medalist(s)	Jean Bouin	France	51:52.4
2nd place, silver medalist(s)	Ernest Glover	England	52:33
3rd place, bronze medalist(s)	Jacques Keyser	France	53:10
4	George Lee	England	53:10.4
5	Gustave Lauvaux	France	53:26.8
6	Christopher Vose	England	53:37.6
7	Harry Baldwin	England	53:45.4
8	George Wallach	Scotland	54:10
9	William Scott	England	54:32
10	Sandy Sanderson	England	54:46.6
11	Angus Kerr	Scotland	54:47.6
12	Allemamen Arbidi	France	54:50.6
13	W.J. Tucker	England	54:54.6
14	Archie Craig Sr.	Scotland	55:00
15	W. Bolton	England	55:26
16	Edgar Stead	Wales	55:36.8
17	Sam Watt	Scotland	55:37
18	John Templeman	Scotland	55:45
19	Louis Pauteix	France	55:55
20	F. Antrobus	England	56:21
21	Pierre Lalaimode	France	
22	René Vignaud	France	
23	Edgar Davies	Wales	
24	Paul Granger	France	
25	Tommy Arthur	Wales	
26	Ali Benallel	France	
27	J. Jones	Wales	
28	Ally McDonald	Scotland	
29	C. Hill	Wales	
30	W. Millard	Wales	
31	Stanley Williams	Wales	
32	George MacKenzie	Scotland	
33	Harry Hughes	Scotland	
34	William Rodger	Scotland	
35	H. Granger	Wales	
—	Alfred Herring	Wales	DNF

== Team Results ==
=== Men's ===
Rank	Country	Team	Points
1	England	Ernest Glover; George Lee; Christopher Vose; Harry Baldwin; William Scott; Sandy Sanderson	38
2	France	Jean Bouin; Jacques Keyser; Gustave Lauvaux; Allemamen Arbidi; Louis Pauteix; Pierre Lalaimode	61
3	Scotland	George Wallach; Angus Kerr; Archie Craig Sr. Sam Watt; John Templeman; Ally McDonald	96
4	Wales	Edgar Stead; Edgar Davies; Tommy Arthur; J. Jones; C. Hill; W. Millard	150

== Participation ==
An unofficial count yields the participation of 36 athletes from four countries.

- England (9)
- France (9)
- Scotland (9)
- Wales (9)

== See also ==
- 1913 in athletics (track and field)
