= Ernest Glover (athlete) =

British long-distance runner

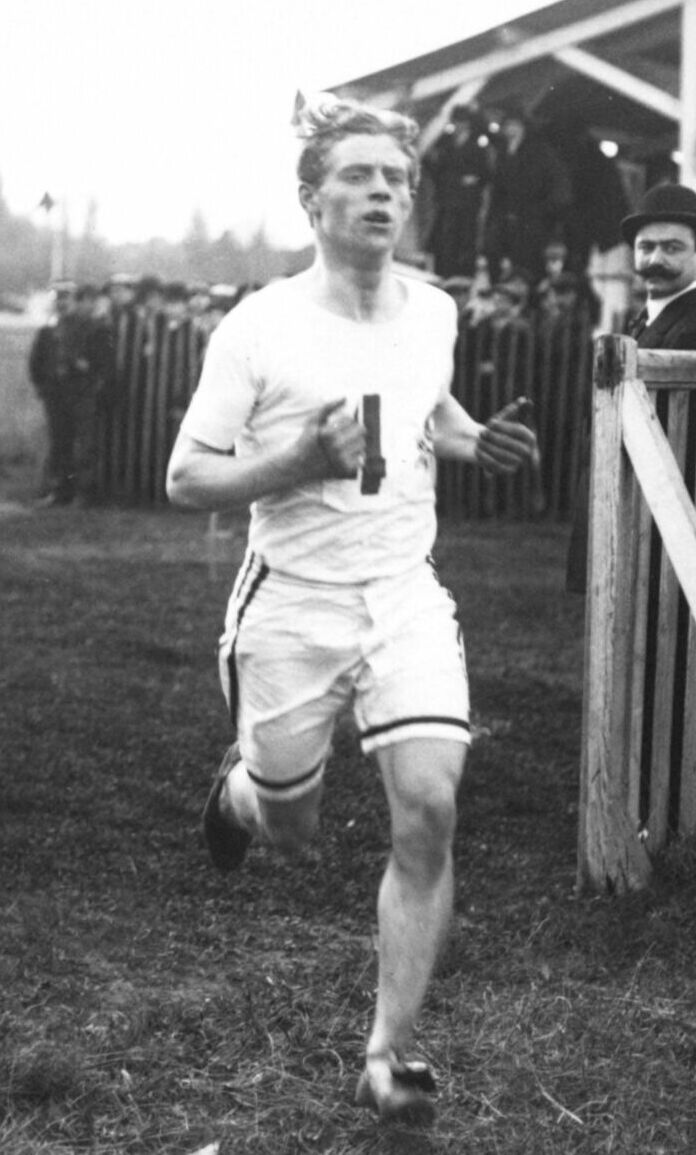
- Ernest Glover in 1913

Personal information
- Born: 19 February 1891 Sheffield, England
- Died: 13 April 1954 (aged 63) Sheffield, England
- Height: 1.80 m (5 ft 11 in)
- Weight: 68 kg (150 lb)
- Parents: Henry Glover, Alice Glover

Sport
- Sport: Athletics
- Events: 5,000 m, 10,000 m
- Club: Hallamshire Harriers, Sheffield

Achievements and titles
- Personal bests: 5000 m – 15:22.6 (1912); 10000 m – 31:48.2 (1913)
Medal record
Representing Great Britain
Olympic Games
Bronze medal – third place	1912 Stockholm	Team cross country
Representing England
International Cross Country Championships
Gold medal – first place	1911 Caerleon	Team
Gold medal – first place	1912 Edinburgh	Team
Gold medal – first place	1913 Juvisy-sur-Orge	Team
Silver medal – second place	1913 Juvisy-sur-Orge	Individual
Gold medal – first place	1914 Amersham	Team
Bronze medal – third place	1914 Amersham	Individual

Ernest Glover (19 February 1891 – 13 April 1954) was a British athlete who competed at the 1912 Summer Olympics held in Stockholm, Sweden.

== Career ==
Glover was selected to represent Great Britain in the 5,000 metres, the 10,000 metres and in cross country at the 1913 Olympic Games. Glover's 16th place in the individual cross country event helped him to earn a bronze medal with teammates Frederick Hibbins and Thomas Humphreys in the team competition. Although he qualified for the 5,000 m and 10,000 m finals, he withdrew from both.

At the 1913 English Cross Country Union championships in Wolverhampton, Glover earned the national title in cross country. (Note: The Association of Road Racing Statisticians indicates that the cross country national championships were an Amateur Athletic Association event.) That same year, Glover became the National 10,000 miles champion after winning the AAA Championships title in a time of 51:56.8. at the 1913 AAA Championships. He also finished second behind George Hutson in the 4 miles event at the same AAA Championships.

At the International Cross Country Championships, Glover finished second to Jean Bouin in 1913, then third to Alfred Nichols and George Wallach in 1914.

Glover continued to race after the war and finished second behind Eric Backman in the 4 miles event at the 1919 AAA Championships and therefore becoming British champion as the best British placed athlete.
