= 1921 International Cross Country Championships =

- Organisers: ICCU
- Edition: 14th
- Date: 19 March
- Host city: Caerleon, Monmouthshire, Wales
- Venue: Caerleon Racecourse
- Events: 1
- Distances: 10 mi (16.1 km)
- Participation: 36 athletes from 4 nations

The 1921 International Cross Country Championships was held in Caerleon, Wales, at the Caerleon Racecourse on 19 March 1921. A report on the event was given in the Glasgow Herald.

Complete results, medalists, and the results of British athletes were published.

== Medalists ==
Event	Gold		Silver		Bronze	
Individual
Men; 10 mi (16.1 km)	Wally Freeman; England	56:53	Bobby Mills; England	57:03	Bevy Bingham; Ireland	57:17
Team
Men	England	33	Ireland	71	Wales	119

== Individual Race Results ==
=== Men's (10 mi / 16.1 km) ===
Rank	Athlete	Nationality	Time
1st place, gold medalist(s)	Wally Freeman	England	56:53
2nd place, silver medalist(s)	Bobby Mills	England	57:03
3rd place, bronze medalist(s)	Bevy Bingham	Ireland	57:17
4	Christopher Vose	England	57:18
5	Joe Blewitt	England	57:46
6	Tim Crowe	Ireland	57:51
7	Larry Cummins	Ireland	58:03
8	George Wallach	Scotland	58:08
9	Dunky Wright	Scotland	58:28
10	J. Dixon	England	58:32
11	Halland Britton	England	58:35
12	Alex Barrie	Scotland	58:38
13	Sam Judd	Wales	58:40
14	Fred Walker	England	59:03
15	Arthur Norcliffe	England	59:40
16	Alec Woods	Ireland	1:00:00
17	Gwyn Morgan	Wales	1:00:13
18	Andy Topping	Ireland	1:00:17
19	W.J. Jones	Wales	1:00:18
20	Alf Pepper	England	1:00:27
21	Tommy Dougherty	Ireland	1:00:30
22	Jim Edwards	Wales	1:00:43
23	Sid Wilson	Wales	1:00:46
24	Paddy Harris	Ireland	1:00:51
25	Edgar Davies	Wales	1:01:03
26	E. Slater	Ireland	1:01:11
27	J.H. Brunning	Wales	1:01:17
28	Anton Hegarty	Ireland	1:01:23
29	Stanley Williams	Wales	1:01:53
30	David Cummings	Scotland	1:02:04
31	James Hill Motion	Scotland	1:02:44
32	Archie Craig Sr.	Scotland	1:03:21
—	Jim Wilson	Scotland	DNF
—	Ernie Thomas	Wales	DNF
—	Alex Lawrie	Scotland	DNF
—	James Gardiner	Scotland	DNF

== Team Results ==
=== Men's ===
Rank	Country	Team	Points
1	England	Wally Freeman; Bobby Mills; Christopher Vose; Joe Blewitt; J. Dixon; Halland Britton	33
2	Ireland	Bevy Bingham; Tim Crowe; Larry Cummins; Alec Woods; Andy Topping; Tommy Dougherty	71
3	Wales	Sam Judd; Gwyn Morgan; W.J. Jones; Jim Edwards; Sid Wilson; Edgar Davies	119
4	Scotland	George Wallach; Dunky Wright; Alex Barrie; David Cummings; James Hill Motion; Archie Craig Sr.	122

== Participation ==
An unofficial count yields the participation of 36 athletes from 4 countries.

- England (9)
- Ireland (9)
- Scotland (9)
- Wales (9)

== See also ==
- 1921 in athletics (track and field)
