= Charles Clibbon =

English long-distance runner (1895–1975)

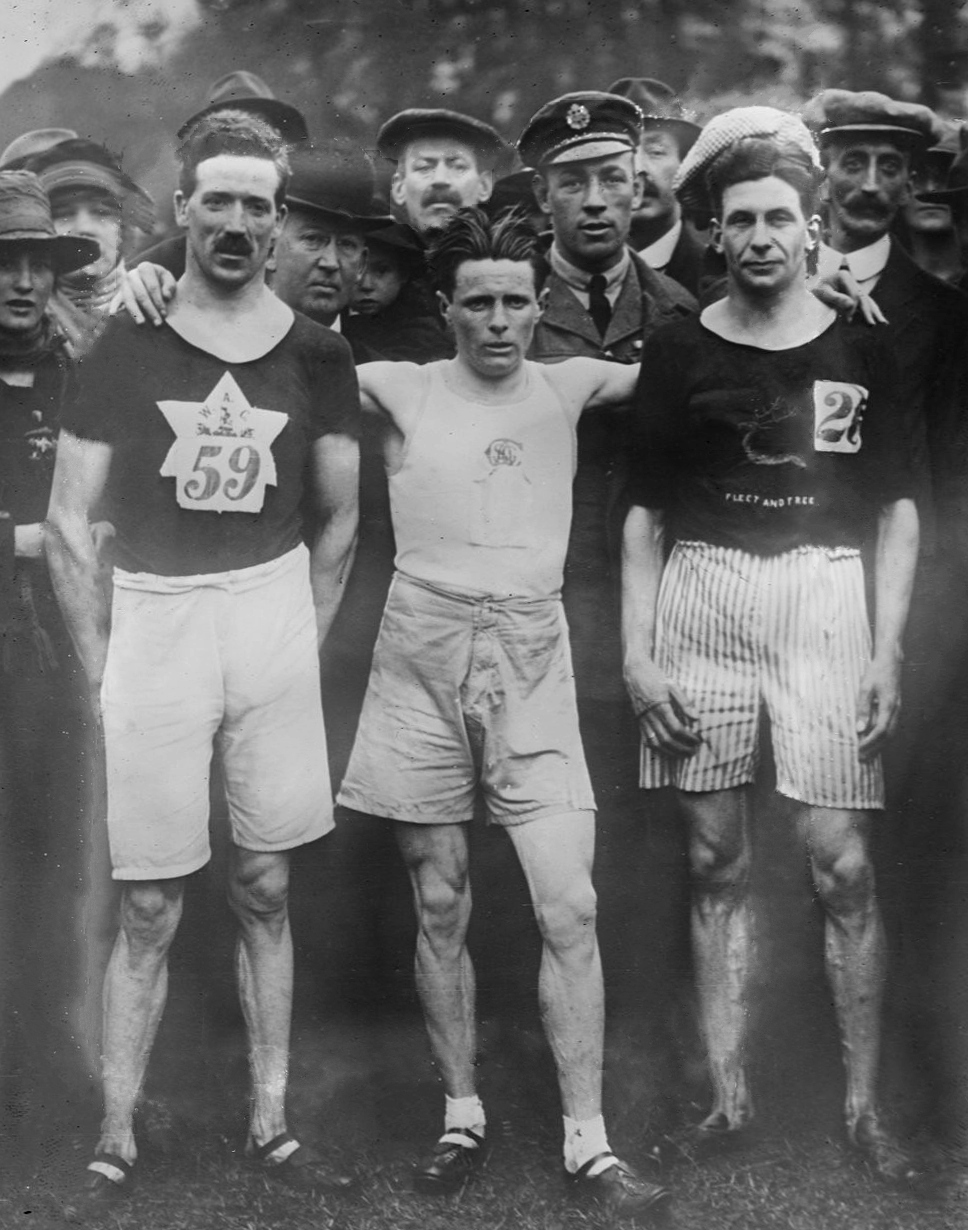
- Charles Clibbon, Joseph Guillemot and Christopher Vose in 1920

Personal information
- Born: 3 February 1895 Ware, Hertfordshire, England
- Died: 4 April 1975 (aged 80) Harmondsworth, London, Great Britain
- Height: 1.80 m (5 ft 11 in)
- Weight: 74 kg (163 lb)

Sport
- Sport: Athletics
- Events: 5000 m, 10,000 m
- Club: Birchfield Harriers; Surrey AC

Achievements and titles
- Personal bests: 5000 m – 15:20.4e (1924); 10000 m – 32:08.8e (1920)
Medal record
Representing England
International Cross Country Championships
Gold medal – first place	1920 Belfast	Team

Charles Thomas Clibbon (3 February 1895 – 4 April 1975) was an English long-distance runner, who competed at the 1920 and 1924 Summer Olympics.

== Career ==
Clibbon became the National 10 mile champion after winning the AAA Championships title at the 1920 AAA Championships.

The following month, he competed at the 1920 Olympic Games in Antwerp, Belgium, where he failed to finish the 10,000 metres final. In 1920, Clibbon also finished fourth at the 1920 International Cross Country Championships, winning a gold medal with the English team.

Clibbon finished second behind Halland Britton in the 10 miles event at the 1922 AAA Championships.

Two years later, at the 1924 Olympic Games, he placed sixth in the 5000 metres and 14th in the 10,000 metres.
