= Nils Dahl =

Norwegian middle-distance runner

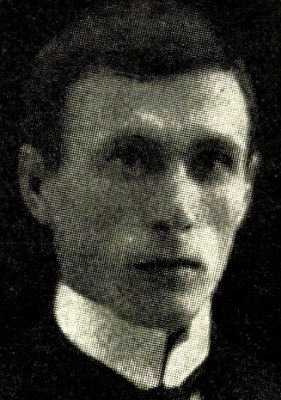

Nils Dahl (12 November 1882 in Kristiania – 17 July 1966 in Oslo) was a Norwegian middle-distance runner who specialised in the 1500 metres. He represented Kristiania IF.

In the 1500 metres at the 1908 Summer Olympics, Dahl placed seventh in his initial semifinal heat and did not advance to the final. At the 1912 Summer Olympics he participated in the individual cross country competition, but did not finish. As such, he did not place in the team cross country competition. He became Norwegian champion in 1500 metres in the years 1906-1909 and in the 5000 metres in 1908.

== Sources ==
- Cook, Theodore Andrea (1908). The Fourth Olympiad, Being the Official Report. London: British Olympic Association.
- De Wael, Herman (2001). "Athletics 1908". Herman's Full Olympians. Archived from the original on 27 September 2006.
- Wudarski, Pawel (1999). "Wyniki Igrzysk Olimpijskich" (in Polish).
