= 1922 AAA Championships =

Outdoor track and field competition

- Dates: 30 June – 1 July 1922
- Host city: London, England
- Venue: Stamford Bridge
- Level: Senior
- Type: Outdoor
- Events: 21

The 1922 AAA Championships was the 1922 edition of the annual outdoor track and field competition organised by the Amateur Athletic Association (AAA). It was held from 30 June to 1 July 1922 at Stamford Bridge in London, England. The attendance on day 2 was estimated to be a record 30,000.

The Championships consisted of 21 events and covered two days of competition.

== Results ==
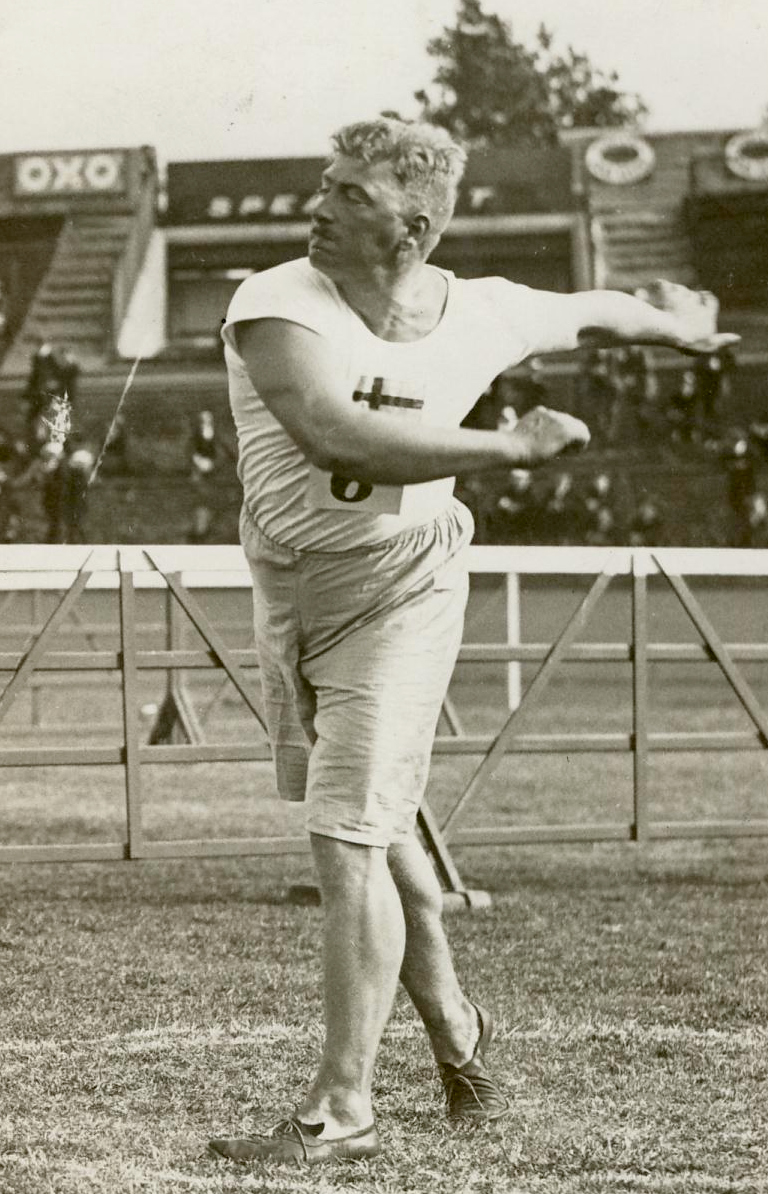
Swede Carl Johan Lind won his fourth AAA title

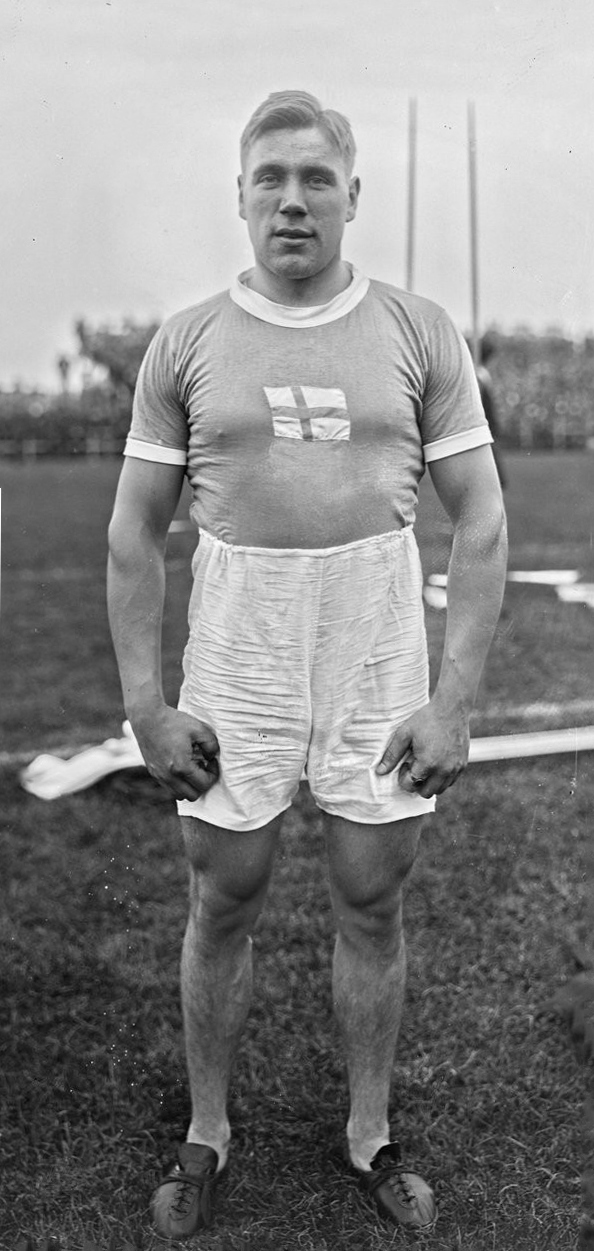
Vilho Niittymaa was one of several Finns to claim a title in 1922

Event	Gold		Silver		Bronze	
100 yards	Harry Edward	10.0	Lancelot Royle	2 ft	(South Africa) Christiaan Steyn	1 ft
220 yards	Harry Edward	22.0	(Switzerland) Josef Imbach	12-14 yd	(South Africa) Christiaan Steyn	dns
440 yards	Harry Edward	50.4	Guy Butler	3 yd	Thomas Cushing	1½-4 yd
880 yards	Edgar Mountain	1:55.6	(Wales) Cecil Griffiths	inches	(Switzerland) Paul Martin	14 yd
1 mile	(Scotland) Duncan McPhee	4:27.4	Henry Stallard	3-4 yd	Joe Blewitt	16 yd
4 miles	(Finland) Paavo Nurmi	19:52.2	Joe Blewitt	20:04.0	Bill Cotterell	20:09.0
10 miles	Halland Britton	53:24.2	Charles Clibbon	53:55.4	Wally Freeman	53:58.0
steeplechase	(Finland) Paavo Nurmi	11:11.2	Bert Rippington	11:34.8	Harry Sweeting	
120y hurdles	Frederick Gaby	15.6	Leopold Partridge	4½ yd	(Republic of Ireland) Thomas Wallis	3 yd
440y hurdles	(Australia) Wilfrid Kent Hughes	59.0	J.J. Evans	12 yd	(France) J. Berthier	
2 miles walk	(Italy) Ugo Frigerio	14:30.0	J. W. Dowse	14:31.8	Robert Bridge	14:39.4
7 miles walk	Gordon Watts	53:24.2	Reg Goodwin	53:37.2	J. W. Dowse	54:03.4
high jump	(France) Pierre Lewden	1.803	(Norway) Sverre Hansen	1.753	(Norway) Erik Manskow	1.727
pole jump	(Norway) Charles Hoff	3.66	(Switzerland) Ernst Gerspach	3.58	only 2 competitors	
long jump	(Norway) Charles Hoff	7.08	(Norway) Sverre Hansen	6.70	(Finland) Vilho Tuulos	6.65
triple jump	(Finland) Vilho Tuulos	14.27	(Norway) Charles Hoff	14.04	(Estonia) Aleksandr Klumberg	13.84
shot put	(Finland) Ville Pörhölä	14.58	(Sweden) Bertil Jansson	13.82	(Finland) Vilho Niittymaa	13.06
discus throw	(Finland) Vilho Niittymaa	41.64	(Estonia) Aleksandr Klumberg	39.34	(Finland) Ville Pörhölä	38.50
hammer throw	(Sweden) Carl Johan Lind	52.50	Malcolm Nokes	49.26	(Finland) Ville Pörhölä	45.81
javelin throw	(Finland) Paavo Johansson	61.08	(Estonia) Aleksandr Klumberg	45.84	(Switzerland) Willi Moser	44.46
1 mile relay	Surrey AC	3m 35.1-5s	Polytechnic Harriers		South London Harriers/LAC	
