= Hjalmar Andersson =

Swedish cross-country runner (1889–1971)

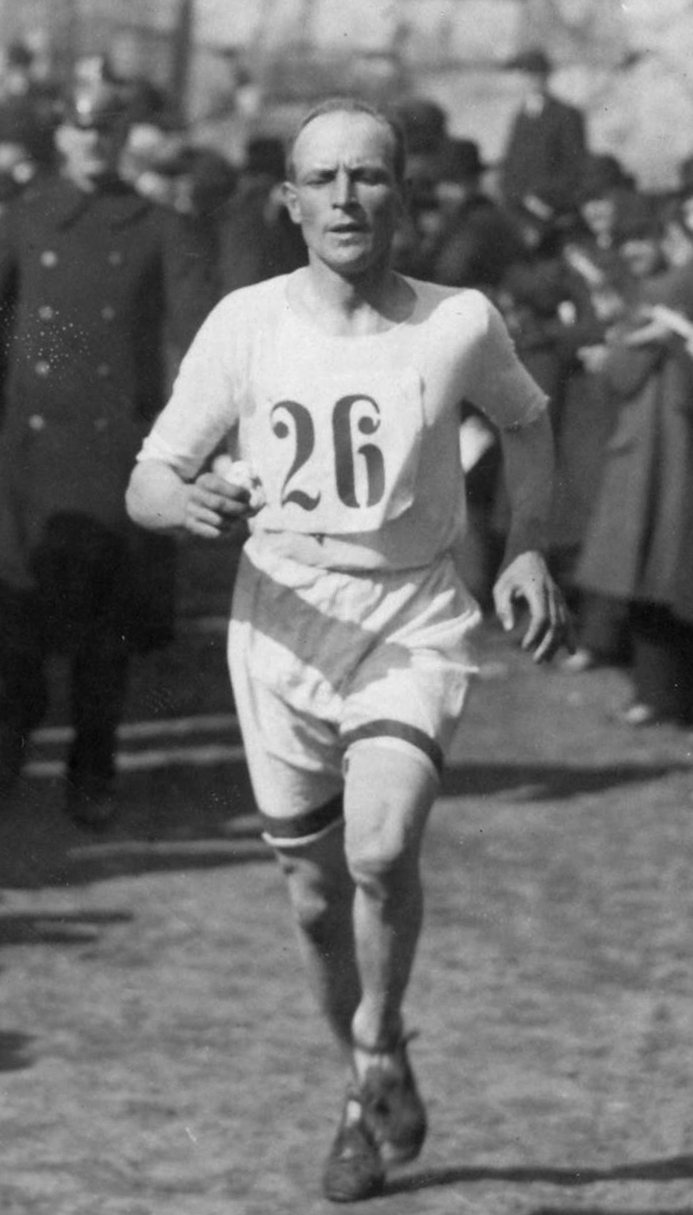

Personal information
- Born: 13 July 1889 Ljusnarsberg Municipality, Sweden
- Died: 2 November 1971 (aged 82) Insjön, Sweden
- Height: 1.72 m (5 ft 8 in)
- Weight: 63 kg (139 lb)

Sport
- Sport: Athletics
- Event: Cross-country running
- Club: Insjöns IF
Medal record
Representing Sweden
Olympic Games
Silver medal – second place	1912 Stockholm	Individual cross country
Gold medal – first place	1912 Stockholm	Team cross country

Svensk Hjalmar Zakeus Andersson (13 July 1889 – 2 November 1971) was a Swedish cross-country runner.

Andersson represented Sweden at the 1912 Summer Olympics in Stockholm, Sweden and won a gold and a silver medal in the cross-country events. He was also a three-time Swedish cross-country champion before he ended his athletics career in 1920 to work in Svalbard.

== Early life ==
Andersson was born in Ljusnarsberg, Västmanland, Sweden on 13 July 1889.

== Career ==
Early in his running career, Andersson became affiliated with Insjöns IF.

He was selected to compete at the 1912 Summer Olympics in Stockholm, Sweden and was entered in the individual cross country, the team cross country and the men's 10,000 m, although he did not start the 10,000 m.

The cross-country events were held at Stockholm Olympic Stadium, Stockholm on 15 July 1912. The course was rather hilly and approximately 12 km long, although this was not made known to competitors before the race. The terrain favoured Andersson and he finished second to win the silver medal. The individual and team races were effectively the same race. Hjalmar's second-place finish helped Sweden win gold by the smallest margin possible, one point, over Finland.

Andersson won the Swedish cross-country championships three times in a row from 1918 to 1920.

His running career ended after the 1920 championships. Andersson left Sweden in 1920 to go and work on Spitsbergen in Svalbard, Norway.

== Death ==
Andersson died on 2 November 1971 in Insjön, Leksand Municipality, Dalarna County, Sweden at the age of 82.
