= 1920 International Cross Country Championships =

- Organisers: ICCU
- Edition: 13th
- Date: 3 April
- Host city: Belfast, Ireland
- Venue: Belvoir Park
- Events: 1
- Distances: 10 mi (16.1 km)
- Participation: 35 athletes from 4 nations

The 1920 International Cross Country Championships was held in Belfast, Ireland, at the Belvoir Park on 3 April 1920. A report on the event was given in the Glasgow Herald.

Complete results, medalists, and the results of British athletes were published.

== Medalists ==
Event	Gold		Silver		Bronze	
Individual
Men; 10 mi (16.1 km)	Jim Wilson; Scotland	55:06	Christopher Vose; England	55:33	Wally Freeman; England	55:52
Team
Men	England	38	Ireland	70	Scotland; France	114

== Individual Race Results ==
=== Men's (10 mi / 16.1 km) ===
Rank	Athlete	Nationality	Time
1st place, gold medalist(s)	Jim Wilson	Scotland	55:06
2nd place, silver medalist(s)	Christopher Vose	England	55:33
3rd place, bronze medalist(s)	Wally Freeman	England	55:52
4	Charles Clibbon	England	56:26
5	Larry Cummins	Ireland	56:27
6	Bobby Mills	England	56:40
7	Lucien Duquesne	France	57:05
8	Tim Crowe	Ireland	57:11
9	Percy Hodge	England	57:15
10	J. Moran	Ireland	57:18
11	Louis Bouchard	France	57:25
12	Anton Hegarty	Ireland	57:30
13	Louis Corlet	France	57:31
14	James Hatton	England	57:35
15	Alf Pepper	England	57:37
16	John Martin	Ireland	57:41
17	Joe Blewitt	England	57:43
18	Angus Kerr	Scotland	57:44
19	J. Beattie	Ireland	57:47
20	Archie Craig Sr.	Scotland	57:49
21	René Vignaud	France	
22	Dunky Wright	Scotland	
23	A. Topping	Ireland	
24	Bevy Bingham	Ireland	
25	Joe Pratt	England	
26	Alex Barrie	Scotland	
27	John Strain	Scotland	
28	J.J. Cronin	Ireland	
29	Andrew Semple	Scotland	
30	Joseph Servella	France	
31	Albert Smith	Scotland	
32	Amar Alim Arbidi	France	
33	Danton Heuet	France	
34	Amédée Isola	France	
—	Joseph Guillemot	France	DNF

== Team Results ==
=== Men's ===
Rank	Country	Team	Points
1	England	Christopher Vose; Wally Freeman; Charles Clibbon; Bobby Mills; Percy Hodge; James Hatton	38
2	Ireland	Larry Cummins; Tim Crowe; J. Moran; Anton Hegarty; John Martin; J. Beattie	70
3	Scotland	Jim Wilson; Angus Kerr; Archie Craig Sr. Dunky Wright; Alex Barrie; John Strain	114
3	France	Lucien Duquesne; Louis Bouchard; Louis Corlet; René Vignaud; Joseph Servella; Amar Alim Arbidi	114

== Participation ==
An unofficial count yields the participation of 35 athletes from 4 countries.

- England (9)
- France (9)
- Ireland (9)
- Scotland (8)

== See also ==
- 1920 in athletics (track and field)
