= John Eke =

Swedish long-distance runner

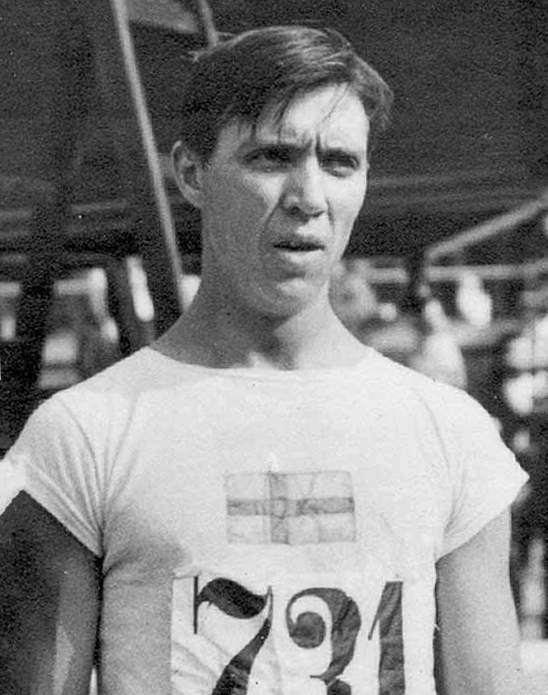
- Eke at the 1912 Olympics

Personal information
- Full name: John Wicktor Eke
- Born: 12 March 1886 Högby, Borgholm, Sweden
- Died: 11 June 1964 (aged 77) Pennsylvania, United States
- Height: 1.71 m (5 ft 7 in)
- Weight: 64 kg (141 lb)

Sport
- Sport: Athletics
- Event: 10000 m
- Club: Södermalms IK, Bromma

Achievements and titles
- Personal best: 10000 m – 33:33.0 (1912)
Medal record
Men's athletics
Representing Sweden
Olympic Games
Gold medal – first place	1912 Stockholm	Team cross country
Bronze medal – third place	1912 Stockholm	Ind. cross country

John Wicktor Eke (12 March 1886 – 11 June 1964) was a Swedish long-distance runner who competed at the 1912 Stockholm Olympics. He won a bronze medal in the individual cross country and a gold in the team cross country event. Eke also progressed to the 10000 m final, but decided to withdraw.

After his 1912 Olympic victory, Eke moved to New York City, where he competed for the Irish American Athletic Club.
