= Martin Persson =

Swedish long-distance runner

Martin Persson (13 October 1886 – 13 February 1918) was a Swedish track and field athlete who competed in the 1912 Summer Olympics.

In 1912, he qualified for the final of the 10000 metres event but did not participate in the race. He was eliminated in the first round in the 5000 metres competition.
