= Bobby Mills (athlete) =

British long-distance runner (1894–1964)

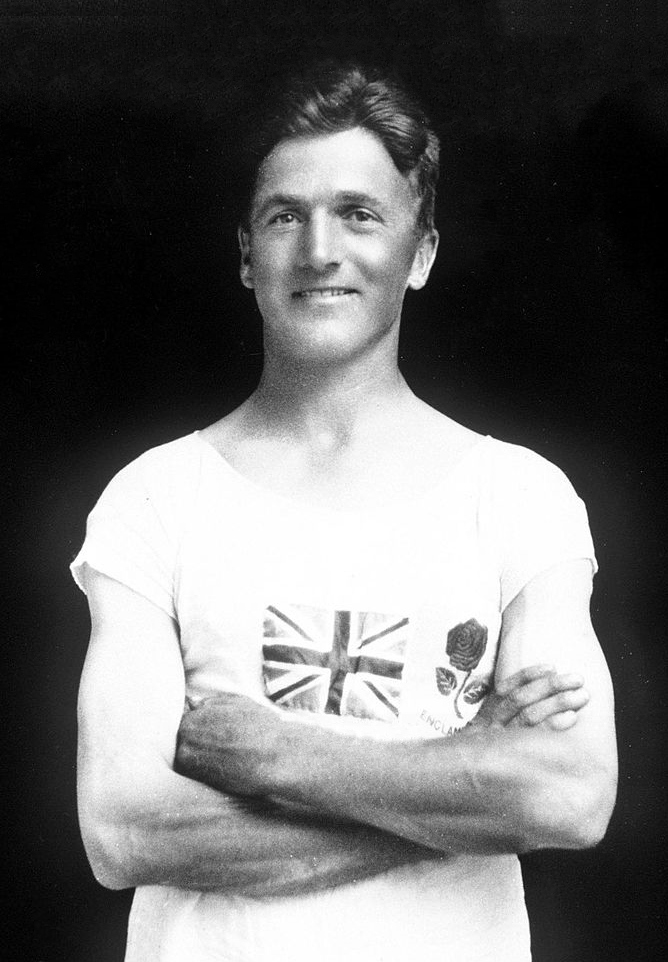
- Bobby Mills in 1920

Personal information
- Nationality: British
- Born: 16 January 1894 Fishtoft, Benington, Lincolnshire, England
- Died: 6 December 1964 (aged 70) Wyberton, Lincolnshire, England
- Height: 1.74 m (5 ft 9 in)
- Weight: 66 kg (146 lb)

Sport
- Sport: Long-distance running
- Event: Marathon
- Club: Leicester Harriers

Achievements and titles
- Personal best: 2:37:40.4 (1920)
Medal record
Representing England
International Cross Country Championships
Gold medal – first place	1920 Belfast	Team
Gold medal – first place	1921 Caerleon	Team
Silver medal – second place	1921 Caerleon	Individual

Albert Robert Mills (16 January 1894 – 6 December 1964) was a British long-distance runner, who competed in the marathon at the 1920 and 1924 Summer Olympics.

== Career ==
Mills finished second behind Charles Clibbon in the 10 miles event at the 1920 AAA Championships. One month later, he competed at the 1920 Olympic Games in Antwerp, Belgium.

He ran his first marathon in 1920, winning the Poly race in a new British record of 2:37:40.4. He also won the Poly race in 1921 and 1922, and competed for England internationally in cross-country running in 1920–1921 and 1923.

Mills represented Great Britain again at the Olympic Games in the marathon event at the 1924 Olympics and finished second behind Sam Ferris in the marathon event at the 1926 AAA Championships.
