= George Lee (athlete) =

British track and field athlete

George Lee (28 December 1886 – 4 October 1968) was a British track and field athlete who competed in the 1912 Summer Olympics. He was born in Durham, County Durham. In 1912 at the Stockholm Olympics, he was eliminated in the first round of the 5000 metres event as well as of the 10,000 metres competition. He was the fourth-place finisher at the 1913 International Cross Country Championships, sharing in the team title with England.
