= Brynolf Larsson =

Swedish long-distance runner

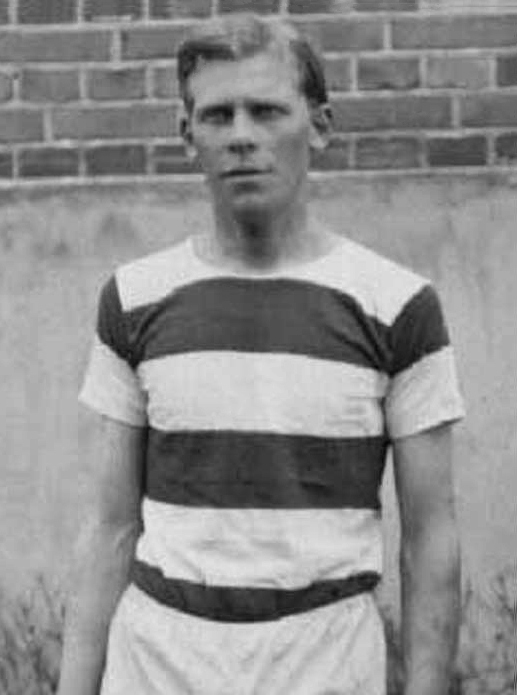

Personal information
- Born: 20 June 1885 Stockholm, Sweden
- Died: 31 December 1973 (aged 88) Stockholm, Sweden
- Height: 176 cm (5 ft 9 in)
- Weight: 63 kg (139 lb)

Sport
- Sport: Athletics
- Event: 10000 m
- Club: Södermalms IK

Achievements and titles
- Personal best: 10000 m – 32:45.2 (1909)

Erik Brynolf Larsson (20 June 1885 – 31 December 1973) was a Swedish long-distance runner who competed in the 1912 Summer Olympics. He finished ninth in the individual cross country competition (ca. 12 km). This was the fourth best Swedish result, so he was not awarded with a medal in the team cross country competition, where only the best three were honored. He also participated in the 10000 m event but failed to reach the final.
