= 1914 International Cross Country Championships =

- Organisers: ICCU
- Edition: 12th
- Date: 28 March
- Host city: Amersham, Buckinghamshire, England
- Venue: Chesham Park
- Events: 1
- Distances: 10 mi (16.1 km)
- Participation: 45 athletes from 5 nations

The 1914 International Cross Country Championships was held in Amersham, England, at the Chesham Park on 28 March 1914. A report on the event was given in the Glasgow Herald.

Complete results, medalists, and the results of British athletes were published.

== Medalists ==
Event	Gold		Silver		Bronze	
Individual
Men; 10 mi (16.1 km)	Alfred Nichols; England	1:00:24	George Wallach; Scotland	1:00:41	Ernest Glover; England	1:00:46
Team
Men	England	47	Scotland	74	France	106

== Individual Race Results ==
=== Men's (10 mi / 16.1 km) ===
Rank	Athlete	Nationality	Time
1st place, gold medalist(s)	Alfred Nichols	England	1:00:24
2nd place, silver medalist(s)	George Wallach	Scotland	1:00:41
3rd place, bronze medalist(s)	Ernest Glover	England	1:00:46
4	F. Antrobus	England	1:01:38
5	James Hughes	Ireland	1:01:42
6	Jim Wilson	England	1:01:54
7	Sid Wilson	Wales	1:02:10
8	James Lindsay	Scotland	1:02:12
9	Pierre Lalaimode	France	1:02:54
10	Cliff Price	Wales	1:02:56
11	Ralph Stanton	England	1:01:58
12	Archie Craig Sr.	Scotland	1:02:59
13	George MacKenzie	Scotland	1:03:04
14	Charles Denis	France	1:03:11
15	L. Pouzette	France	1:03:12
16	Tommy Arthur	Wales	1:03:14
17	W.G. Murray	Ireland	1:03:16
18	Alfred Bonvicini	France	1:03:17
19	David Peat	Scotland	1:03:18
20	Sam Watt	Scotland	1:03:36
21	J. Beattie	Ireland	1:03:46
22	W. Bolton	England	1:03:47
23	Charles Ruffell	England	1:04:02
24	Paul Granger	France	1:04:16
25	W. Millard	Wales	1:04:34
26	Allemamen Arbidi	France	1:04:51
27	P. Waters	Wales	1:04:56
28	Jack J. Martin	Ireland	1:05:05
29	Sandy Sanderson	England	1:05:30
30	W. Winkworth	Ireland	1:05:35
31	Frank Ryder	Ireland	1:05:41
32	Edgar Davies	Wales	1:05:53
33	Ernest Massey	Wales	1:06:03
34	Maurice Grolleau	France	1:06:09
35	Jack Wootton	England	1:06:35
36	Jack Miles	Wales	1:06:41
37	J. Grey	Ireland	1:06:55
38	John Templeman	Scotland	1:07:22
39	Marcel Dudant	France	1:08:11
40	Sam Judd	Wales	1:15:26
—	Bertie Irwin	Ireland	DNF
—	Louis Pauteix	France	DNF
—	G.R. Stephen	Scotland	DNF
—	Geo Cummings	Scotland	DNF
—	A. Moore	Ireland	DNF

== Team Results ==
=== Men's ===
Rank	Country	Team	Points
1	England	Alfred Nichols; Ernest Glover; F. Antrobus; Jim Wilson; Ralph Stanton; W. Bolton	47
2	Scotland	George Wallach; James Lindsay; Archie Craig Sr. George MacKenzie; David Peat; Sam Watt	74
3	France	Pierre Lalaimode; Charles Denis; L. Pouzette; Alfred Bonvicini; Paul Granger; Allemamen Arbidi	106
4	Wales	Sid Wilson; Cliff Price; Tommy Arthur; W. Millard; P. Waters; Edgar Davies	117
5	Ireland	James Hughes; W.G. Murray; J. Beattie; Jack J. Martin; W. Winkworth; Frank Ryder	132

== Participation ==
An unofficial count yields the participation of 45 athletes from 5 countries.

- England (9)
- France (9)
- Ireland (9)
- Scotland (9)
- Wales (9)

== See also ==
- 1914 in athletics (track and field)
