= John Klintberg =

Swedish long-distance runner

Personal information
- Nationality: Swedish
- Born: 6 February 1885 Stockholm, Sweden
- Died: 16 December 1955 (aged 70) Stockholm, Sweden

Sport
- Sport: Athletics
- Event: Long-distance running

John Klintberg (6 February 1885 – 16 December 1955) was a Swedish athlete. He competed in the men's individual cross country event at the 1912 Summer Olympics.
