= Christopher Vose =

British long-distance runner

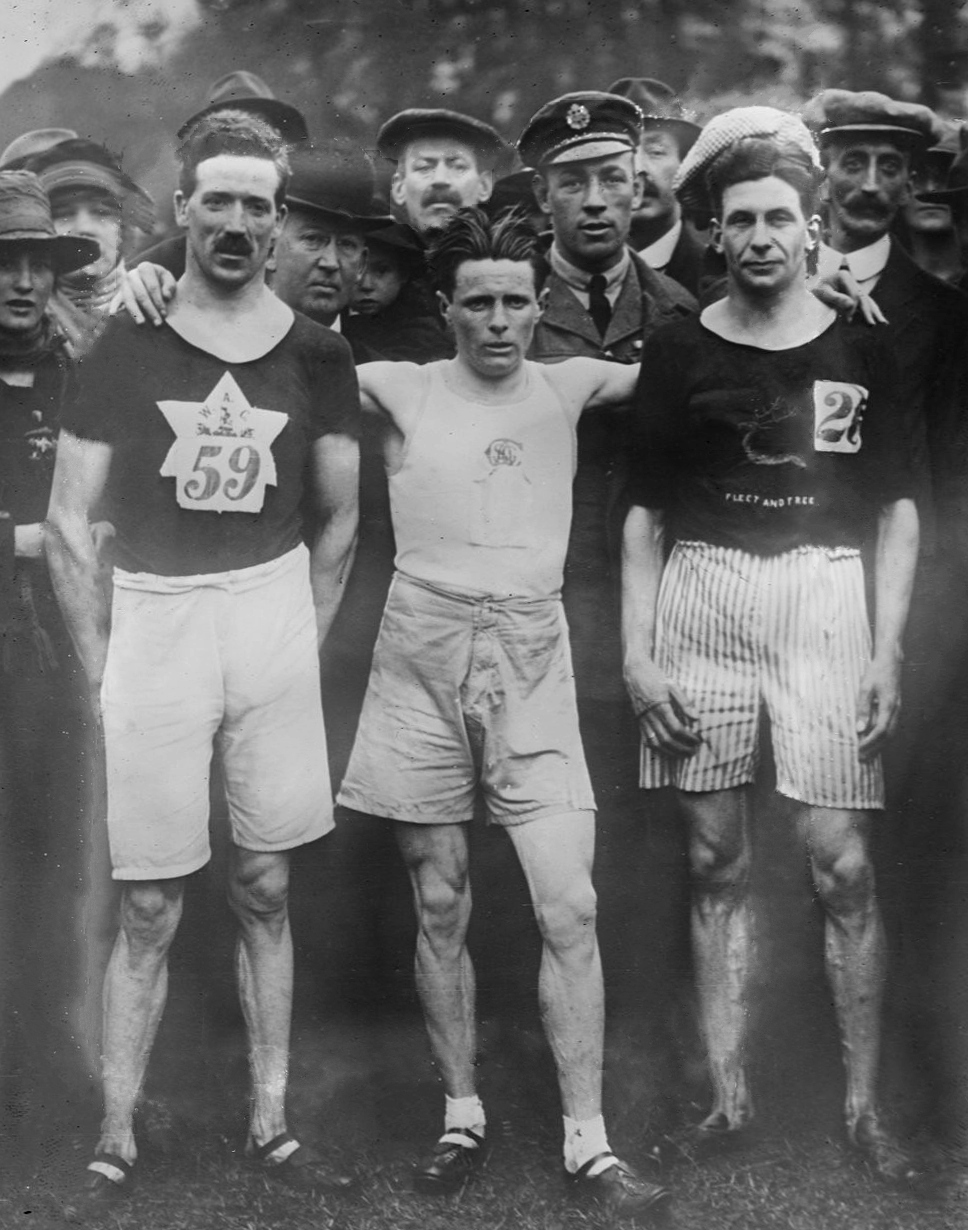
- Charles Clibbon, Joseph Guillemot and Christopher Vose in 1920

Personal information
- Born: 27 January 1887 Preston, Lancashire, England
- Died: 22 August 1970 (aged 83) Warrington, England

Sport
- Sport: Athletics
- Event: Cross country running
- Club: Warrington Athletic Club
Medal record
Representing England
International Cross Country Championships
Gold medal – first place	1911 Caerleon	Team (6 ind)
Gold medal – first place	1912 Edinburgh	Team (11 ind)
Gold medal – first place	1913 Juvisy-sur-Orge	Team (6 ind)
Gold medal – first place	1920 Belfast	Team
Silver medal – second place	1920 Belfast	Individual
Gold medal – first place	1921 Caerleon	Team (4 ind)

Christopher Vose (27 January 1887 – 22 August 1970) was an English cross-country runner. He finished 19th in the individual cross-country race at the 1920 Summer Olympics and fourth among British runners, and therefore did not score for the silver medal-winning British team. He also competed at the International Cross Country Championships in 1911–13 and 1920–21, winning one individual silver medal and five team gold medals.
