= Alfta =

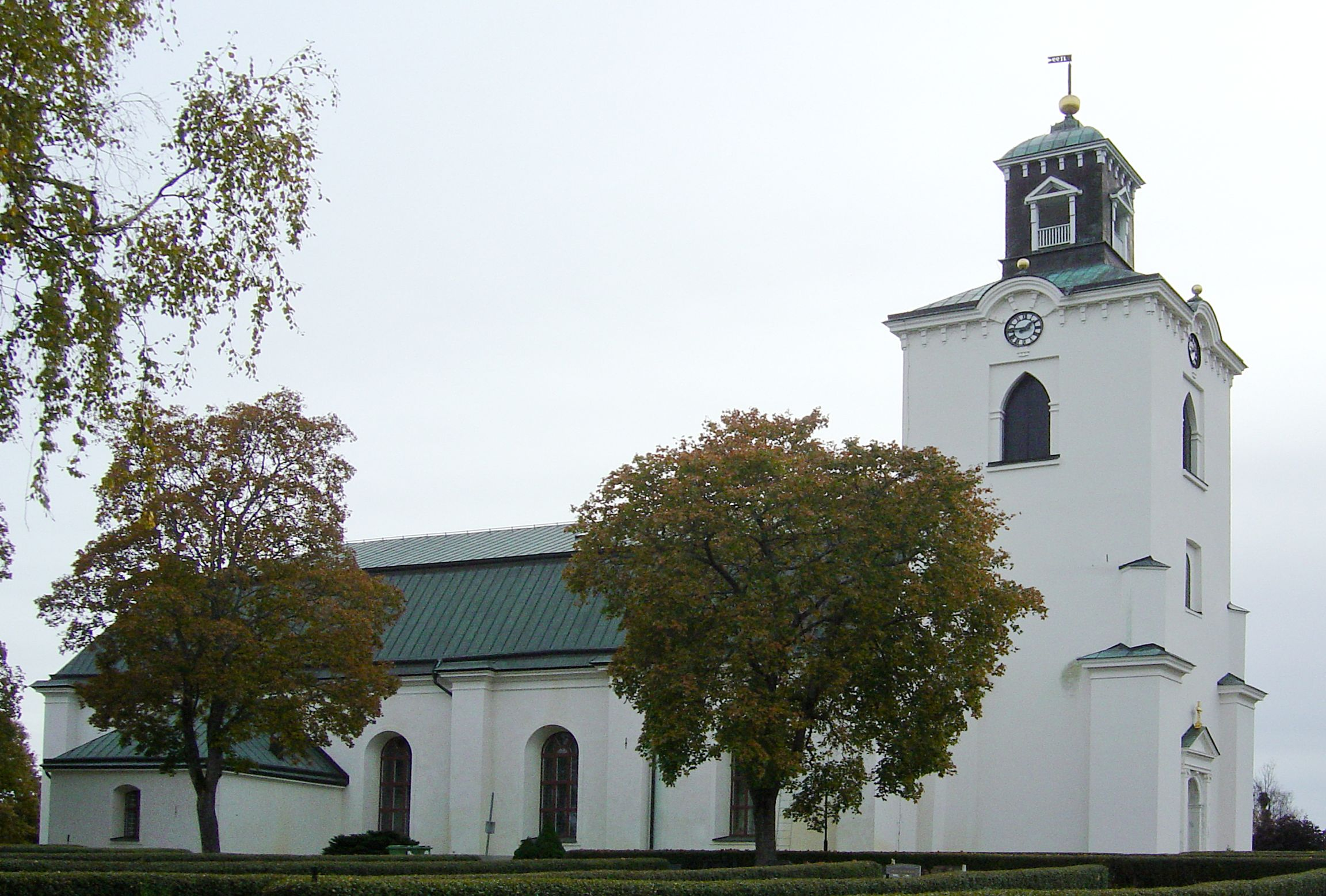
- Alfta Church in October 2009

- Location within Sweden Gävleborg Location within Sweden
- Coordinates: 61°21′N 16°05′E
- Country: Sweden
- Province: Hälsingland
- County: Gävleborg County
- Municipality: Ovanåker Municipality

Area
  - Total: 3.43 km^{2} (1.32 sq mi)

Population (31 December 2010)
  - Total: 2,465
  - Density: 719/km^{2} (1,860/sq mi)
- Time zone: UTC+1 (CET)
  - Summer (DST): UTC+2 (CEST)

Alfta is a locality situated in Ovanåker Municipality, Gävleborg County, Sweden with 2,465 inhabitants in 2020.

== Notable people ==
- Martin Hellgren (born 1991), Swedish professional ice hockey player
