= Christiaan Steyn =

South African sprinter

Personal information
- Nationality: South African
- Born: 2 September 1897 Malmesbury, Cape Colony

Sport
- Sport: Sprinting
- Event: 4 × 100 metres relay

Christiaan Lodewijk Steyn (born 2 September 1897, date of death unknown) was a South African sprinter, who competed at the 1924 Summer Olympics.

== Career ==
Steyn finished third behind Harry Edward in the 100 yards and 220 yards events at the 1922 AAA Championships.

At the 1924 Olympic Games, Steyn competed in the men's 4 × 100 metres relay. The following year Steyn finished second behind Richard Honner in the long jump event at the 1925 AAA Championships.
