= Johannes Andersen (athlete) =

Norwegian long-distance runner (1888–1967)

Johannes E. H. Andersen (September 29, 1888 – December 2, 1967) was a Norwegian long-distance runner.

He participated in the individual cross country competition at the 1912 Summer Olympics and finished 22nd. Together with his teammates Olaf Hovdenak and Parelius Finnerud, he finished fourth in the team cross country competition.
