= Louis Pauteix =

French long-distance runner

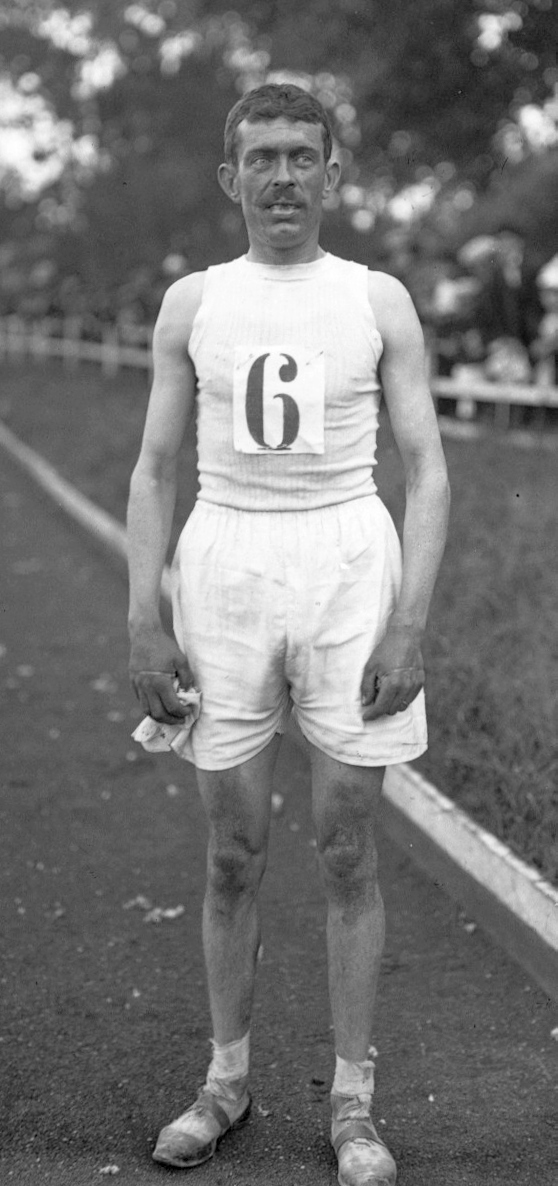
- Louis Pauteix in 1912

Personal information
- Born: 18 April 1883 Uzès, France
- Died: 11 February 1931 (aged 47) Uzès, France

Sport
- Sport: Athletics
- Event: Marathon
- Club: SC Marseille

Achievements and titles
- Personal best: Marathon – 2:36:19 (1913)
Medal record
Representing France
International Cross Country Championships
Silver medal – second place	1913 Juvisy-sur-Orge	Team

Louis Pauteix (18 April 1883 – 11 February 1931) was a French long-distance runner. He competed at the International Cross Country Championships in 1910–1914 and won a team silver medal in 1913, placing fourth in 1911 and 1912. He took part in the marathon event at the 1912 Summer Olympics but failed to finish.
