= Olaf Hovdenak =

Norwegian long-distance runner

Olaf Sigvart Hovdenak (October 6, 1891 – September 12, 1929) was a Norwegian long-distance runner. He represented SK Freidig in Trondheim.

At the 1912 Summer Olympics, he participated in the individual cross country competition and finished nineteenth. Together with his teammates Parelius Finnerud and Johannes Andersen, he finished fourth in the team cross country competition. He became Norwegian champion in the 5000 metres in 1913 and 1916 and in the 10,000 metres the same years.
