= Albert Öberg =

Swedish long-distance runner

Bror Albert Öberg (24 August 1888 – 12 May 1990) was a Swedish athlete who competed at the 1912 Summer Olympics. In Stockholm he participated in the men's 10000 metres event, but was eliminated in the semi-finals after placing sixth, the only competitor to finish the race but not advance to the final. He was born in Härnösand and was a member of IFK Härnösand. He died in Gävle in 1990 at the age of 101.
