= Gustaf Carlén =

Swedish long-distance runner

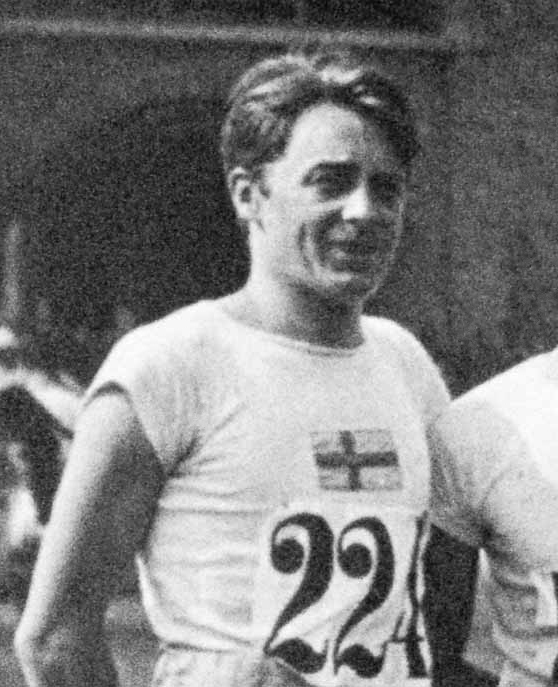
- Carlén at the 1912 Olympics

Personal information
- Born: 29 December 1890 Nyköping, Sweden
- Died: 8 January 1975 (aged 83) Oxelösund, Sweden
- Height: 177 cm (5 ft 10 in)
- Weight: 67 kg (148 lb)

Sport
- Sport: Athletics
- Event: Cross-country
- Club: IFK Oxelösund

Gustaf Fredrik Carlén (29 December 1890 – 8 January 1975) was a Swedish long-distance runner who competed in the 1912 Summer Olympics. He finished 21st in the individual cross country competition (ca. 12 km). This was the eighth-best Swedish result, so he was not awarded a medal in the team cross country competition, where only the best three were honoured. The course was rather hilly and ca. 12 km long; it was not made known to competitors before the race.
