= Parelius Finnerud =

Norwegian long-distance runner

Parelius N. Finnerud (20 October 1888 – 9 December 1969) was a Norwegian long-distance runner. He represented TK Tjalve.

At the 1912 Summer Olympics, he finished twentieth in the individual cross country competition. Together with his teammates Olaf Hovdenak and Johannes Andersen, he finished fourth in the team cross country competition. He became Norwegian champion in the 10,000 metres in 1914.
