= Vladimír Penc =

Czech long-distance runner

Personal information
- Nationality: Czech
- Born: 10 September 1893 Prague, Austria-Hungary

Sport
- Sport: Long-distance running
- Events: 10,000m, marathon

Vladimír Penc (born 10 September 1893, date of death unknown) was a Czech long-distance runner. He competed for Bohemia in the 10,000 metres and the marathon at the 1912 Summer Olympics.
