= Axel Lindahl (athlete) =

Swedish long-distance runner (1885–1959)

Personal information
- Nationality: Swedish
- Born: 8 December 1885 Stockholm, Sweden
- Died: 8 August 1959 (aged 73) Stockholm, Sweden

Sport
- Sport: Athletics
- Event: Long-distance running

Axel Lindahl (8 December 1885 – 8 August 1959) was a Swedish athlete. He competed in the men's individual cross country event at the 1912 Summer Olympics.
