= Jalmari Eskola =

Finnish long-distance runner

Olympic medal record

Men's athletics

Representing (Russia) Finland
Silver medal – second place	1912 Stockholm	Team cross country

Jalmari Johannes ("Lauri") Eskola (16 November 1886 in Karinainen – 7 January 1958 in Turku) was a Finnish athlete who competed mainly in the cross country running.

He competed for Finland in the 1912 Summer Olympics held in Stockholm, Sweden in the cross country team where he won the silver medal with his teammates Hannes Kolehmainen and Albin Stenroos.
