= Larry Cummins =

Irish long-distance runner

Personal information
- Born: 12 January 1889 Kinsale, County Cork, Ireland
- Died: 16 March 1954 (aged 65) Cheltenham, England

Sport
- Sport: Athletics
- Event: Long distance
- Club: Polytechnic Harriers

Laurence Michael Cummins (12 January 1889 - 16 March 1954) was an Irish long-distance and steeplechase runner, who competed at the 1920 Summer Olympics.

== Career ==
Cummins finished second behind Percy Hodge in the 2 miles steeplechase event at the 1919 AAA Championships.

The following year at the 1920 Olympic Games, he placed 26th in the individual cross country, competing for Great Britain.

Four times he participated in the International Cross Country Championships with following rankings:

- 1920: 5
- 1921: 7
- 1922: 30
- 1927: 33
