= Johan Sundkvist =

Swedish long-distance runner

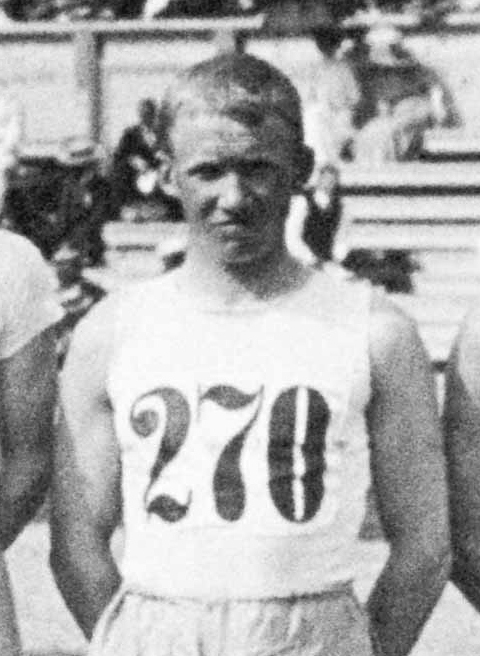
- Sundkvist at the 1912 Olympics

Personal information
- Born: 22 June 1889 Ockelbo, Sweden
- Died: 16 December 1977 (aged 88) Horndal, Sweden
- Height: 168 cm (5 ft 6 in)
- Weight: 65 kg (143 lb)

Sport
- Sport: Athletics
- Event(s): 5000 m, 10000 m
- Club: Gefle IF

Achievements and titles
- Personal best(s): 5000 m – 15:55.8 (1915); 10000 m – 33:40.2 (1919)

Johan Adolf Sundkvist (22 June 1889 – 16 December 1977) was a Swedish long-distance runner who competed in the 1912 Summer Olympics. He finished tenth in the individual cross country competition. This was the fifth-best Swedish result, so he was not awarded a medal in the team cross country competition, where only the best three were honoured. The course was rather hilly and ca. 12 km long; it was not made known to competitors before the race.
