= Klas Lundström =

Swedish long-distance runner

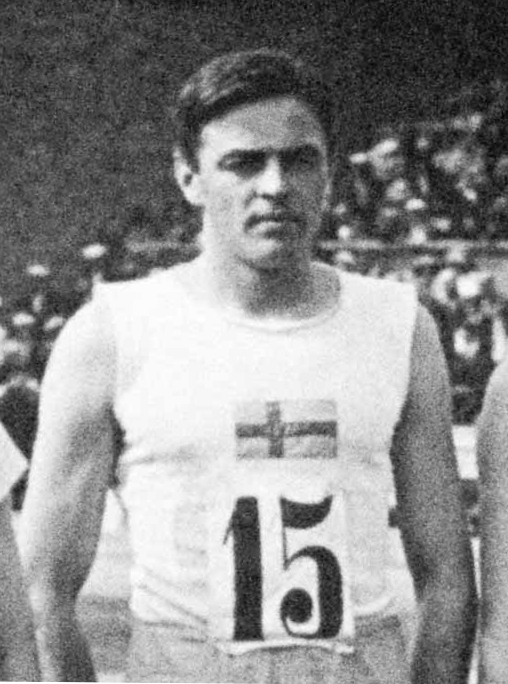

Personal information
- Born: 19 February 1889 Piteå, Sweden
- Died: 26 March 1951 (aged 62) Nacka, Sweden
- Height: 180 cm (5 ft 11 in)
- Weight: 72 kg (159 lb)

Sport
- Sport: Athletics
- Event: 1500-10000 m
- Club: IK Göta

Achievements and titles
- Personal bests: 1500 m – 4:10.0 (1911); 5000 m – 15:40.4 (1912); 10000 m – 33:26.4 (1911)

Klas Julius Lundström (19 February 1889 – 26 March 1951) was a Swedish track and field athlete who competed in the 1912 Summer Olympics. He finished 13th in the individual cross country competition (ca. 12 km). This was the sixth-best Swedish result, so he was not awarded a medal in the team cross country competition, where only the best three were honoured. He also participated in the 5000 m event but failed to reach the final.
