= Lewis Tewanima =

Olympic athlete (1888–1969)

Louis Tewanima
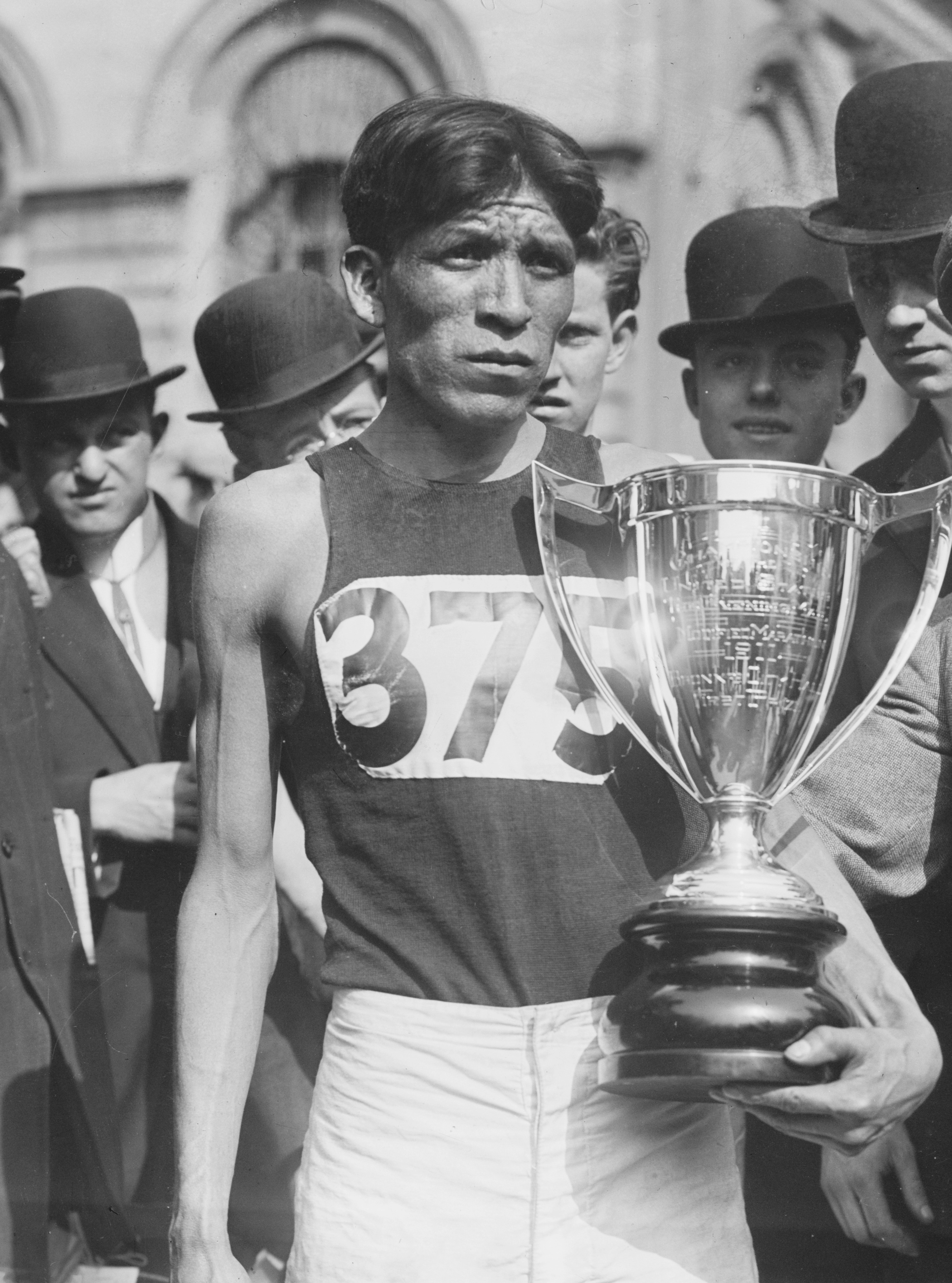
- Tewanima in 1911

Personal information
- Born: Tsökahovi Tewanima; 1888 Shungopavi Second Mesa, Arizona, United States
- Died: January 18, 1969 (aged 80–81) Second Mesa, Arizona, United States
- Height: 1.60 m (5 ft 3 in)
- Weight: 51 kg (112 lb)

Sport
- Sport: Long-distance running
- Club: Carlisle Indian Industrial School
Medal record
Representing the United States
Olympic Games
| Silver medal – second place | 1912 Stockholm | 10000 metres |

Louis Tewanima (1888 – January 18, 1969), also known as Tsökahovi Tewanima and Lewis Tewanima, was an American two-time Olympic distance runner and silver medalist in the 10,000 meter run in 1912. He was a Hopi Indian and ran for the Carlisle Indian School where he was a teammate of Jim Thorpe. His silver medal in 1912 remained the best U.S. achievement in this event until another Native American, Billy Mills, won the gold medal in 1964. Tewanima also competed at the 1908 Olympics, finishing in ninth place in the marathon.

== Biography ==
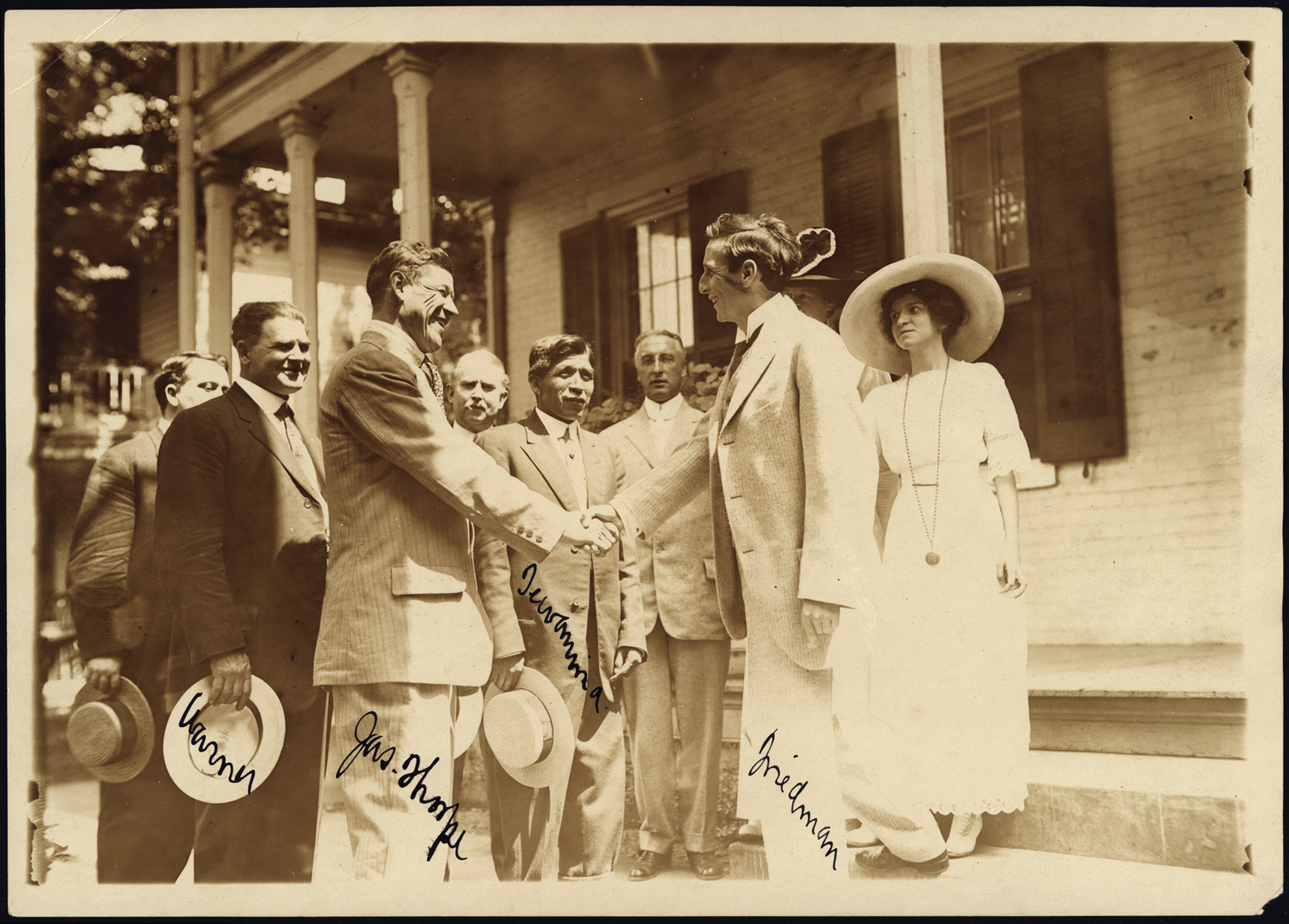
Jim Thorpe shaking hands with Moses Friedman while Glenn "Pop" Warner (left), Tewanima (center), and a crowd look on

Tewanima was a Hopi Native American and spent nearly his entire life on a reservation in Arizona. In 1906, as a result of a dispute between the Hopi and U.S. Government over school education for children, Tewanima was sent to Fort Wingate in New Mexico and in 1907 to Carlisle Indian School, where he became a teammate of Jim Thorpe and won numerous long-distance races. Tewanima once ran the Boston Marathon in 1909 but failed to finish after leading the race for 18 miles.

After the 1912 Olympics, Tewanima returned to his reservation and spent the rest of his life herding sheep and growing crops. In 1954, he was selected for the all-time U.S. Olympic track & field team, and in 1957, inducted into the Arizona Sports Hall of Fame. Tewanima died after falling from a 70-foot cliff while returning home in the night.

Tewanima is a running legend to the Hopi tribe, and there is a race dedicated to him every year on top of Second Mesa. The race is primarily a 10K and 5K, which is held on the Sunday of Labor Day weekend. The 10K and 5K courses start in the village on top of the mesa and follow a foot trail that descends and circles around the mesa. The 10K includes a 3-mile run through a riverbed. The last part of both the 5K and 10K is a climb up stairs back to the top of the mesa where the finish line is located. Among other great runners, Billy Mills has been sighted in attendance at this event called the Louis Tewanima Footrace.

== See also ==
- Hopi people
- Native Americans in the United States
