= Martin Hellgren =

Swedish ice hockey player

- Born: April 1, 1991 (age 34) Alfta, Sweden
- Height: 5 ft 10 in (178 cm)
- Weight: 172 lb (78 kg; 12 st 4 lb)
- Position: Centre
- Shoots: Right
- Elitserien team: Brynäs IF
- Playing career: 2011–present

Martin Hellgren (born April 1, 1991) is a Swedish professional ice hockey player. He played with Brynäs IF in the Elitserien during the 2010–11 Elitserien season.
