= Thomas Humphreys (athlete) =

British long-distance runner

Personal information
- Born: 8 September 1890 Wingrave, Buckinghamshire, England
- Died: 9 April 1967 (aged 76) Aston Abbotts, Buckinghamshire, England

Sport
- Sport: Athletics
- Event: long-distance
- Club: Herne Hill Harriers
Medal record
Men's athletics
Representing Great Britain
Olympic Games
Bronze medal – third place	1912 Stockholm	Team cross country

Thomas Frederick Humphreys (8 September 1890 – 9 April 1967) was a British athlete who competed at the 1912 Summer Olympics.

== Career ==
Humphreys born in Wingrave, Buckinghamshire, finished second behind William Scott in the 10 miles event at the 1912 AAA Championships. He was affiliated with Herne Hill Harriers.

Shortly after the AAA Championships, he competed for Great Britain at the 1912 Summer Olympics, held in Stockholm, Sweden. He won the bronze medal with his teammates Frederick Hibbins and Ernest Glover in the Cross Country Team event.

He died in Aston Abbotts.
