= Edvin Hellgren =

Swedish athlete

Personal information
- Nationality: Swedish
- Born: 11 May 1888 Österåker, Sweden
- Died: 25 February 1919 (aged 30) Stockholm, Sweden

Sport
- Sport: Athletics
- Event: Long-distance running

Edvin Hellgren (11 May 1888 – 25 February 1919) was a Swedish athlete. He competed in the men's individual cross country event at the 1912 Summer Olympics.

Hellgren represented Djurgårdens IF.
