= Mosky Mills =

English footballer

Personal information
- Full name: Albert Henry Mills
- Date of birth: 8 February 1889
- Place of birth: Charlton, England
- Date of death: 4 September 1972 (aged 83)
- Place of death: Eastwood, England
- Position: Outside left

Senior career*
| Years | Team | Apps | (Gls) |
- Crescent United
| 1905 | Charlton Athletic | | |
| 1913–1914 | Croydon Common | 0 | (0) |
| 1920–1921 | Charlton Athletic | 3 | (0) |
| 1924 | Catford Southend | | |
| 1934 | Tunbridge Wells Rangers | | |
- * Club domestic league appearances and goals

Albert Henry Mills (8 February 1889 – 4 September 1972) was an English football outside left who played in the Football League for Charlton Athletic.

== Personal life ==
Mills was a cable maker by profession. He served in the British Army during the First World War and was seriously wounded.

== Career statistics ==
| Club | Season | League | | | FA Cup | | Total | |
| Club | Season | Division | Apps | Goals | Apps | Goals | Apps | Goals |
|---|---|---|---|---|---|---|---|---|
| Croydon Common | 1913–14 | Southern League Second Division | 2 | 0 | 0 | 0 | 2 | 0 |
| Charlton Athletic | 1921–22 | Third Division South | 3 | 0 | 0 | 0 | 3 | 0 |
| Career total | | | 5 | 0 | 0 | 0 | 5 | 0 |
