= Tatu Kolehmainen =

Finnish long-distance runner

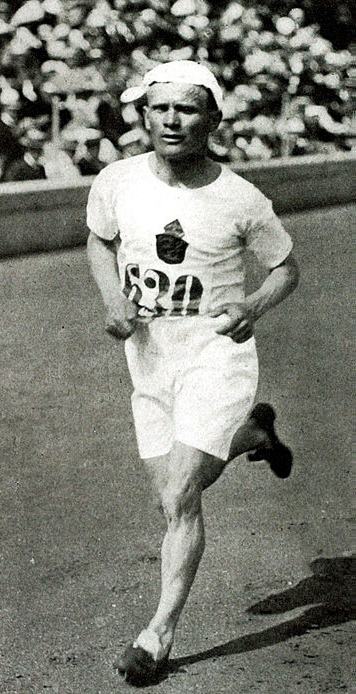
- Tatu Kolehmainen at the 1912 Olympics

Personal information
- Nationality: Finnish
- Born: 21 April 1885 Kuopio, Finland
- Died: 15 June 1967 (aged 82) Helsinki, Finland
- Height: 162 cm (5 ft 4 in)
- Weight: 54–57 kg (119–126 lb)

Sport
- Sport: Long-distance running
- Events: 5000 m, 10,000 m, marathon
- Club: Helsingin Jyry, Helsinki; HKV, Helsinki

Achievements and titles
- Personal bests: 5000 m – 15:29.5 (1914); 10000 m – 32:24.9 (1912); Mar – 2:29:08 (1912)

Tatu Kolehmainen (21 April 1885 – 15 June 1967) was a Finnish long-distance runner who competed at the 1912 and 1920 Summer Olympics. In 1912, he reached the finals of 10,000 m and marathon races but failed to finish due to a strong heat. In 1920, he placed 10th in the marathon. His younger brother Hannes competed alongside him at the 1912 and 1920 Games.
