= Ernst Gerspach =

Swiss decathlete

Personal information
- Nationality: Swiss
- Born: 24 April 1897
- Died: 16 February 1974 (aged 76)

Sport
- Sport: Athletics
- Event: Decathlon

Ernst Gerspach (24 April 1897 – 16 February 1974) was a Swiss athlete. He competed in the men's decathlon at the 1920 Summer Olympics and the 1924 Summer Olympics.
