= Wally Freeman (athlete) =

British athlete

Personal information
- Full name: Walter Freeman
- Nationality: British
- Born: 6 September 1893 Astwood Bank, England
- Died: October 1987 Colchester, England

Sport
- Sport: Athletics
- Event: Long-distance running
- Club: Birchfield Harriers

Walter "Wally" Freeman (6 September 1893 – October 1987) was a British athlete, who competed at the Olympic Games.

== Career ==
Freeman competed in the men's individual cross country event at the 1920 Summer Olympics.

Freeman finished third behind Halland Britton in the 10 miles event at the 1922 AAA Championships.
