= Ville Kyrönen =

Finnish long-distance runner

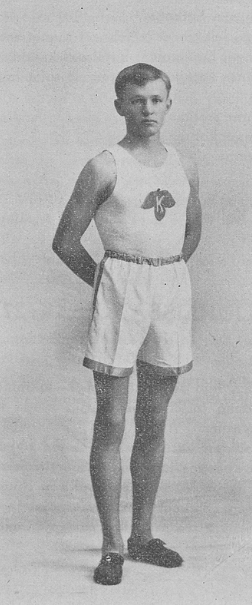
- Runner Kyronen

Personal information
- Born: 14 January 1891 Nilsiä, Finland
- Died: 24 May 1959 (aged 68) New York City

Sport
- Sport: Long-distance running
Medal record
Men's modern pentathlon
Representing Finland
Olympic Games
Silver medal – second place	1912 Stockholm	Team Cross Country

Ville Kyrönen (14 January 1891 – 24 May 1959) was a Finnish long-distance runner. Kyrönen won a silver medal in the team cross country event at the 1912 Summer Olympics. He also ran in the marathon at the 1924 and 1932 Summer Olympics. He moved to the United States where he had his own bakery in Finntown, Brooklyn, New York.
