= Josef Ternström =

Swedish long-distance runner

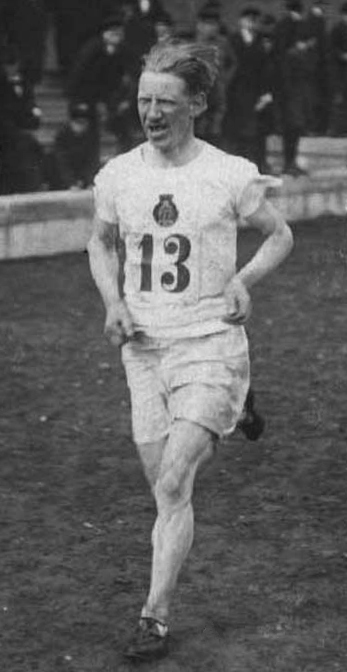

Personal information
- Born: 4 December 1888 Gävle, Sweden
- Died: 2 May 1953 (aged 64) Söderala, Sweden
- Height: 172 cm (5 ft 8 in)
- Weight: 66 kg (146 lb)

Sport
- Sport: Athletics
- Event: 1500-10000 m
- Club: Gefle IF

Achievements and titles
- Personal best(s): 1500 m – 4:11.2 (1916); Mile – 4:31.8 (1907); 5000 m – 15:19.2 (1918); 10000 m – 32:05.2 (1915)
Medal record
Representing Sweden
Olympic Games
Gold medal – first place	1912 Stockholm	Team cross country

Carl Josef Ternström (4 December 1888 – 2 May 1953) was a Swedish runner. He competed at the 1912 Summer Olympics in cross country events and won a team gold medal, finishing fifth individually. The course was rather hilly and approximately 12 km long; it was not made known to competitors before the race.
