= René Vignaud =

French long-distance runner

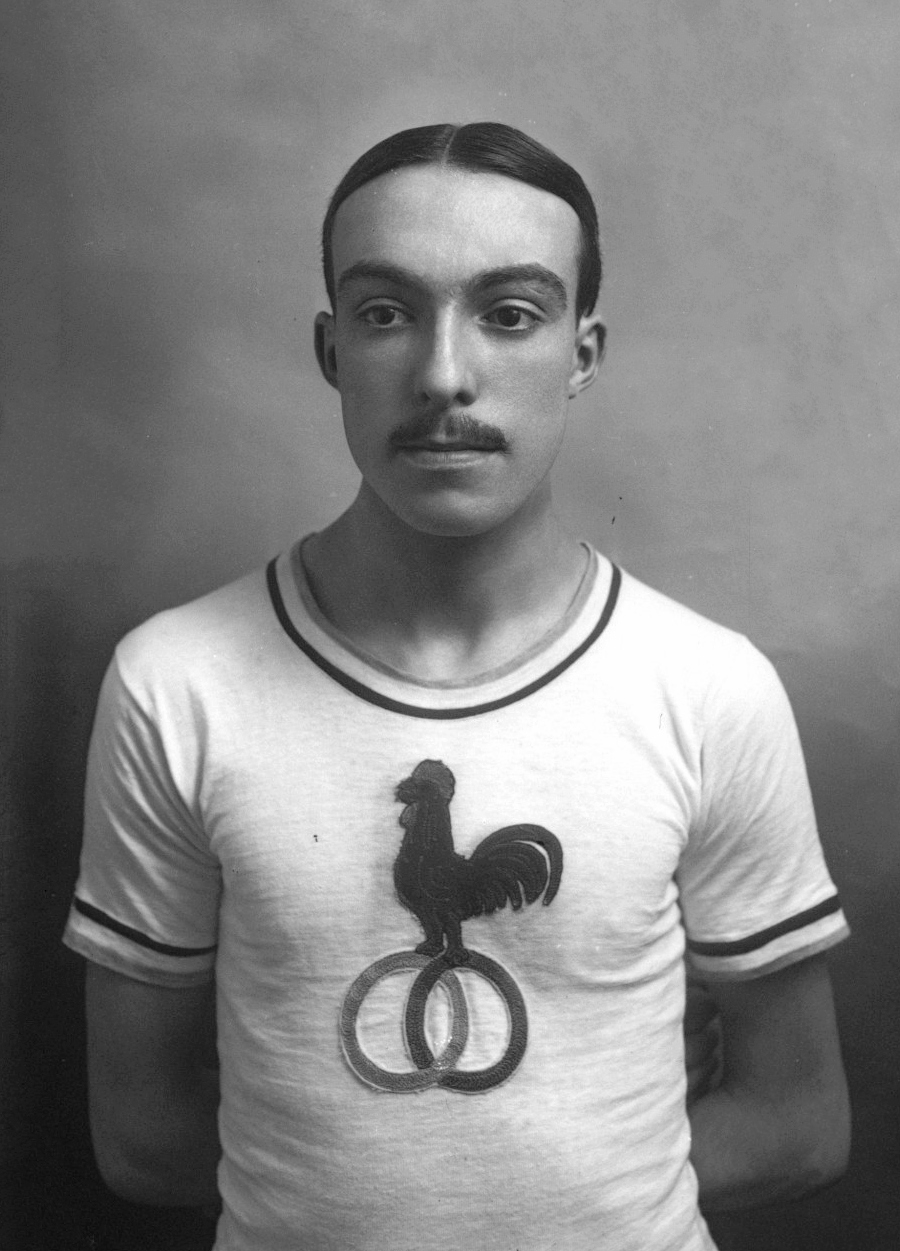
- René Vignaud in 1913

Personal information
- Born: 19 January 1893
- Died: 18 October 1969 (aged 76)

Sport
- Sport: Athletics
- Event: 3000 m
- Club: Racing Club de France, Paris

Achievements and titles
- Personal best(s): 5000 m – 15:45.0 (1913); 10,000 m – 32:40.0 (1920)
Medal record
Representing France
International Cross Country Championships
Bronze medal – third place	1920 Belfast	Team

René Vignaud (19 January 1893 – 18 October 1969) was a French runner. He competed in the 3000 m event at the 1920 Summer Olympics and finished fourth with the French team. He also took part in the International Cross Country Championships in 1913 and 1920, and won a team bronze medal in 1920.

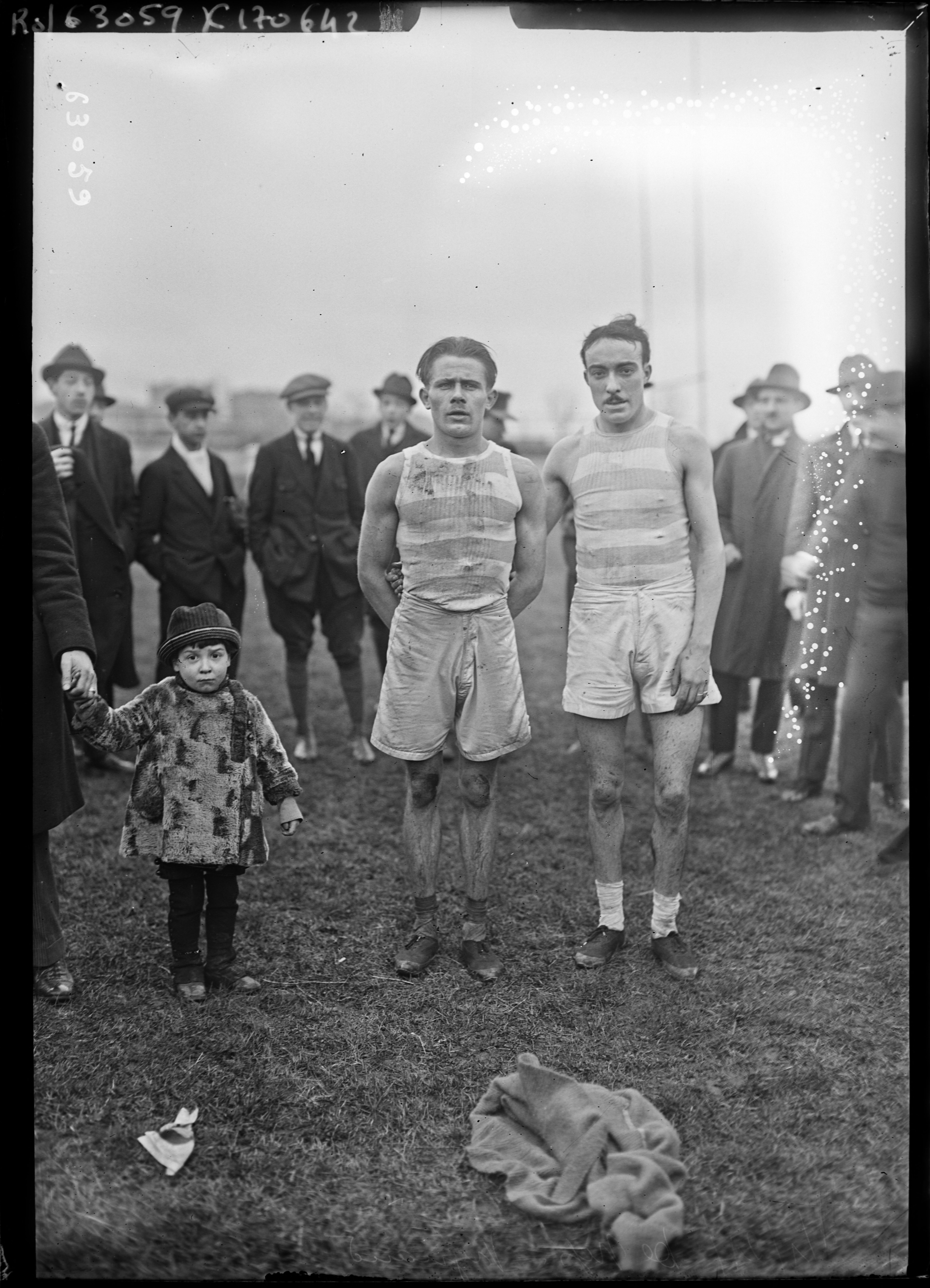
At "Cross de l'Auto" in the Bois de Boulogne on 9 January 1921
