= Joseph Servella =

French long-distance runner

Personal information
- Nationality: French
- Born: 23 April 1896 Castagniers, France
- Died: 25 January 1980 (aged 83) Castagniers, France

Sport
- Sport: Athletics
- Event: Long-distance running

Joseph Servella (23 April 1896 – 25 January 1980) was a French athlete. He competed in the men's individual cross country event at the 1920 Summer Olympics.
