= Halland Britton =

English long-distance runner (1890–1975)

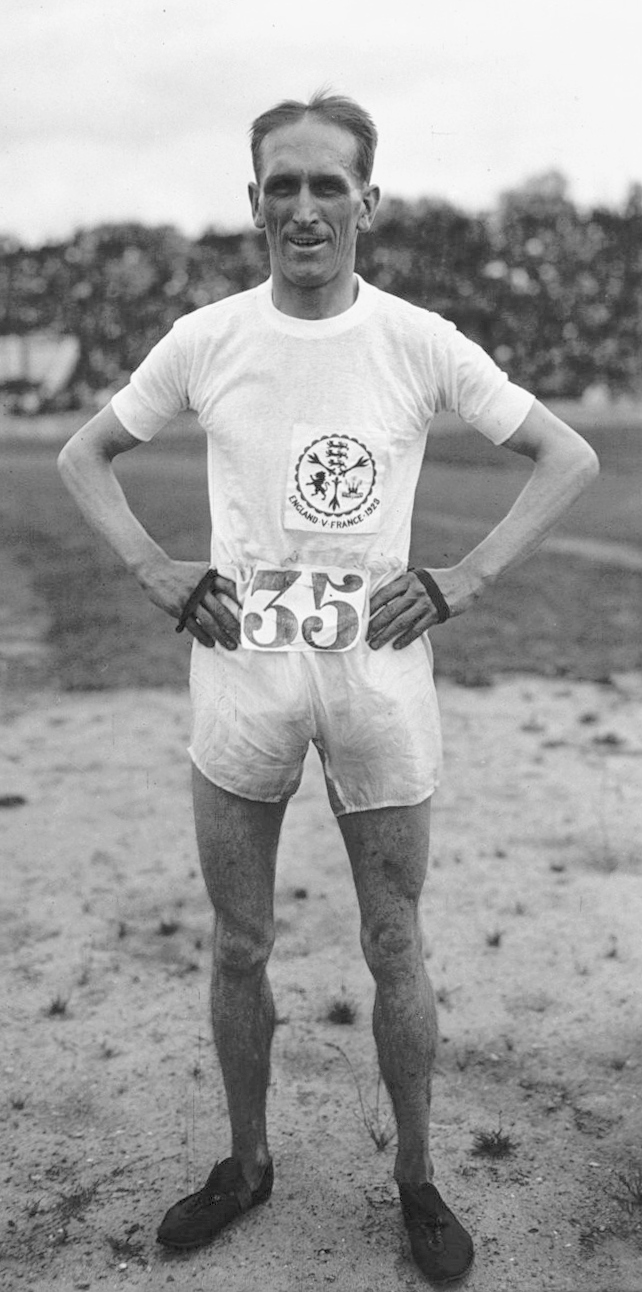
- Halland Britton in 1923

Personal information
- Born: 18 February 1890 Derby, England
- Died: 11 February 1975 (aged 84) Coventry, England

Sport
- Sport: Athletics
- Events: 5,000 m; 10,000 m
- Club: Derby & County AC

Achievements and titles
- Personal bests: 5,000 – 15:15.0 (1923); 10,000 m – 32:06.0e (1924)
Medal record
Representing England
International Cross Country Championships
Gold medal – first place	1921 Caerleon	Team

Halland Britton (18 February 1890 – 11 February 1975) was an English long-distance runner who competed at the Olympic Games.

== Career ==
Britton finished third behind Percy Hodge in the steeplechase event at the 1920 AAA Championships.

The following year Britton became the National 10 miles champion after winning the AAA Championships title at the 1921 AAA Championships. He retained his title in 1922 and 1924. Britton placed 11th at the 1921 International Cross Country Championships, winning a gold medal with the England team.

At the 1924 Summer Olympics, Britton finished sixth in the 10 km race. The following year he finished third in the 4 and 10 miles events at the 1925 AAA Championships.
