= Jean Bouin =

French middle-distance runner

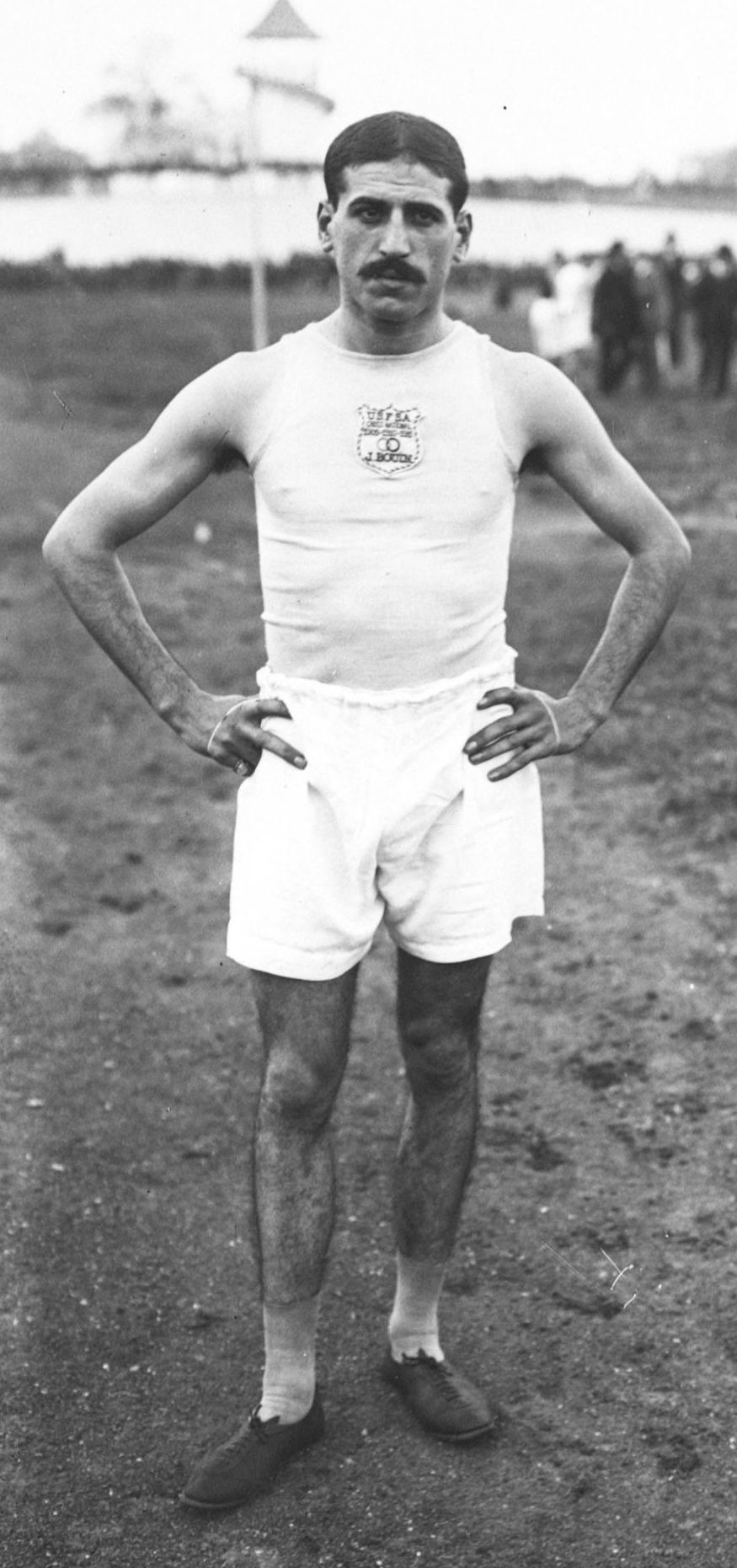
- Jean Bouin in 1911

Personal information
- Born: 21 December 1888 Marseille, France
- Died: 29 September 1914 (aged 25) Xivray-et-Marvoisin, France
- Height: 1.72 m (5 ft 8 in)
- Weight: 70 kg (154 lb)

Sport
- Sport: Athletics
- Event: 800–10,000 m
- Club: US Phocéenne, Marseille; Paris Jean-Bouin, Paris

Achievements and titles
- Personal bests: 800 m – 2:00.4 (1914); 1500 m – 4:14.4 (1911); 5000 m – 14:36.7 (1912); 10,000 m – 30:58.8 (1911)
Medal record
Representing France
Olympic Games
Silver medal – second place	1912 Stockholm	5000 metres
International Cross Country Championships
Silver medal – second place	1909 Derby	Individual
Gold medal – first place	1911 Caerleon	Individual
Gold medal – first place	1912 Edinburgh	Individual
Gold medal – first place	1913 Juvisy-sur-Orge	Individual
Silver medal – second place	1913 Juvisy-sur-Orge	Team

Alexandre François Étienne Jean Bouin (French: [bwɛ̃]; 21 December 1888 – 29 September 1914) was a French middle-distance runner. He competed in the 1500m at the 1908 Olympics and the 5000m at the 1912 Olympics. He won a silver medal in the 5000m in 1912, behind Hannes Kolehmainen. His race against Kolehmainen has long been regarded as one of the most memorable moments in running. Kolehmainen and Bouin quickly pulled away from the others, with Bouin leading and Kolehmainen repeatedly trying to pass him. Kolehmainen succeeded only 20 metres from the finish, winning by 0.1 seconds. Both contenders broke the previous world record.

Bouin set three more world records: two in 1911, in the 3,000 m and 10,000 metres, and one in 1913, in the one-hour run (19,021 metres). The following year, he was killed in action during World War I. After that the Stade Jean-Bouin in the 16th arrondissement of Paris, home of the Stade Français rugby union club, was named after him. The French government made a stamp with his picture on it and many games have been held in his honor. A 10 km race under the name of Jean Bouin has occurred every year through the streets of Barcelona since 1920.

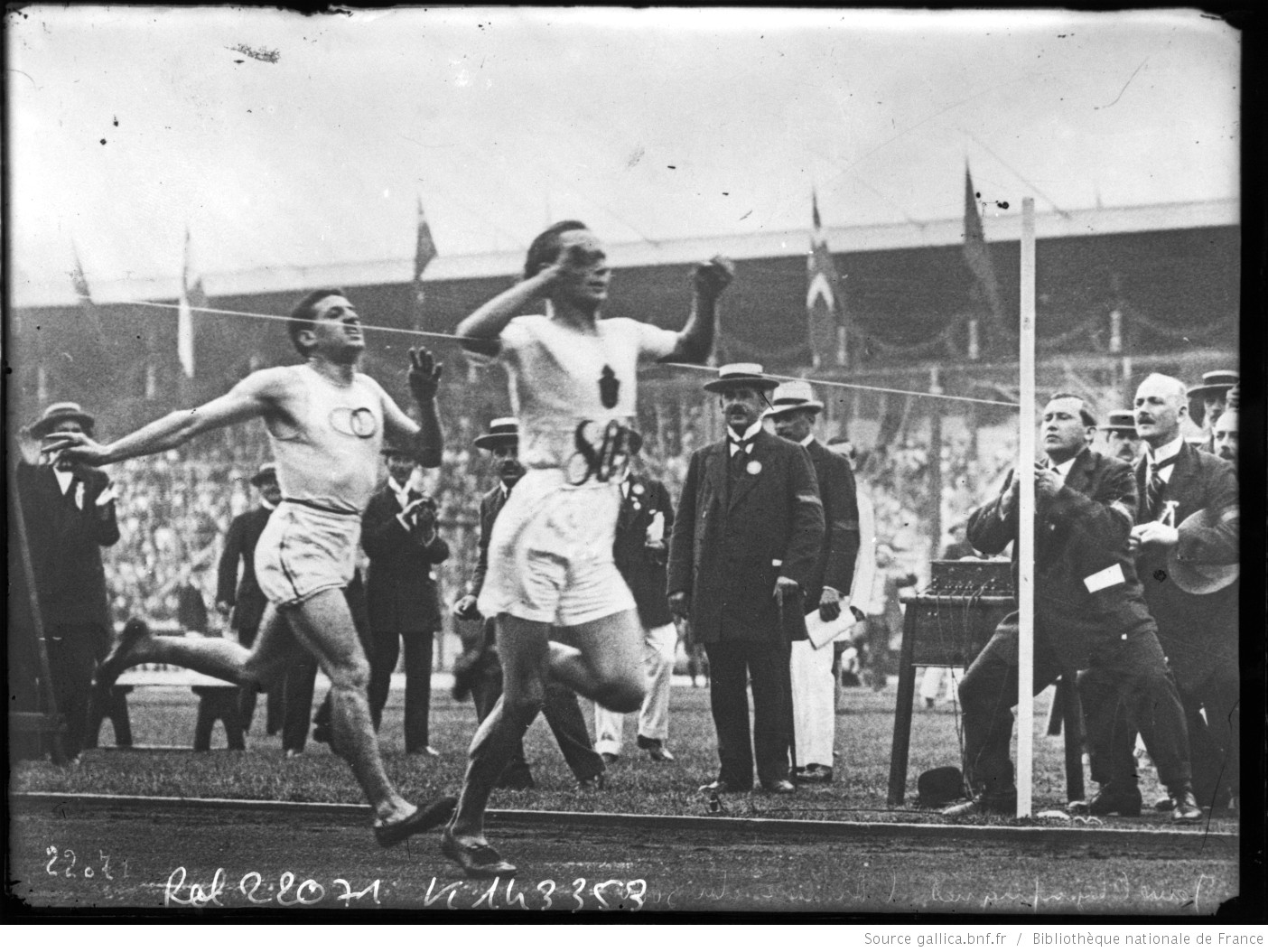
Jean Bouin finishing behind Hannes Kolehmainen at the 1912 Olympics

Records
Preceded by John Svanberg	Men's 3,000 m World Record Holder; 11 June 1911 – 24 September 1911	Succeeded by Hannes Kolehmainen
Preceded by Alfred Shrubb	Men's 10,000 m World Record Holder; 16 November 1911 – 22 June 1921	Succeeded by Paavo Nurmi
