= Albin Stenroos =

Finnish long-distance runner

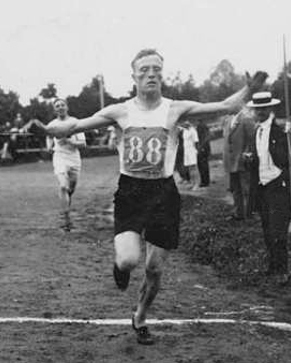

Personal information
- Born: 24 February 1889 Vehmaa, Finland
- Died: 30 April 1971 (aged 82) Helsinki, Finland
- Height: 173 cm (5 ft 8 in)
- Weight: 64 kg (141 lb)

Sport
- Sport: Athletics
- Event: 1500 m – marathon
- Club: Helsingin Reipas; HKV, Helsinki

Achievements and titles
- Personal bests: 1500 m – 4:10.5 (1912); 3000 m – 8:54.1 (1912); 5000 m – 15:24.0 (1915); 10000 m – 32:21.8 (1912); Marathon – 2:41:23 (1924)
Medal record
Olympic Games
Representing (Russia) Finland
Silver medal – second place	1912 Stockholm	Team cross country
Bronze medal – third place	1912 Stockholm	10000 m
Representing Finland
Gold medal – first place	1924 Paris	Marathon

Oskar Albinus "Albin" Stenroos (24 February 1889 – 30 April 1971) was a Finnish runner, who won the marathon at the 1924 Olympics.

Stenroos ran his first marathon in 1909, placing third at the national championships, but then moved to shorter distances, down to 1500 m. He would run his next marathon in 1924. In 1910, he won the 10,000 m race at the Finnish nationals. In the absence of Hannes Kolehmainen, Stenroos won the national titles over 5000 m and 10,000 m from 1912 to 1916 and the cross country title in 1915–1917.

At the 1912 Summer Olympics, Stenroos won the bronze medal over 10,000 m behind Kolehmainen. He also finished sixth in the cross country and aided his team to second place. In 1915, he ran his first world record over 30 km (1:48:06.2), which he improved in 1924 (1:46:11.6). He also held the 20 km world record in 1923 (1:07:11.2). He skipped the 1920 Summer Olympics, but decided to run the marathon in 1924. He won the race in hot conditions, beating second-placed Romeo Bertini by almost six minutes. He placed second at the 1926 Boston Marathon and retired after failing to finish in 1927.
