= Jacques Keyser =

French athlete (1885–1954)

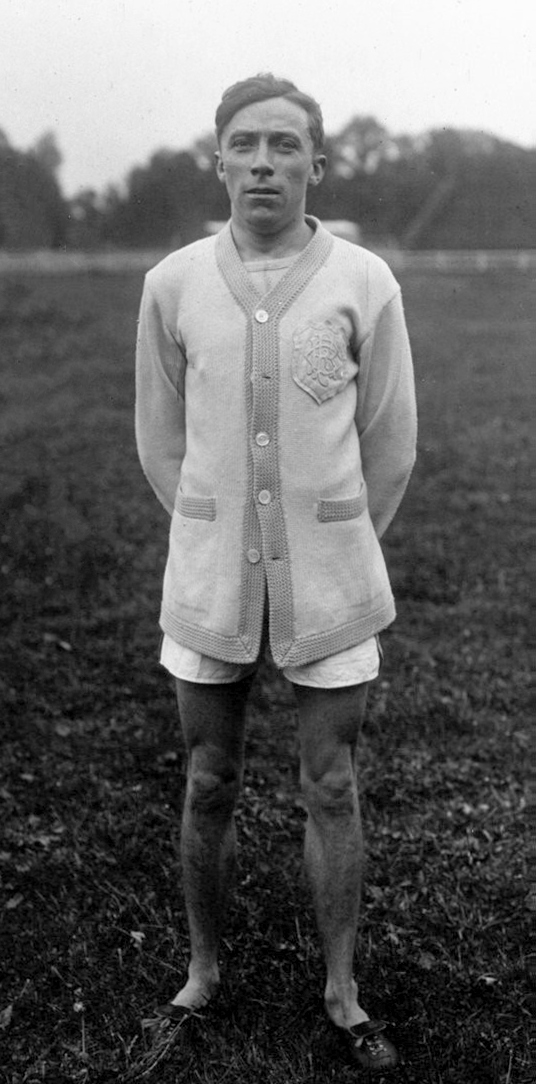
- Jacques Keyser in 1914

Personal information
- Born: 12 October 1885 Paris, France
- Died: 21 March 1954 (aged 68) Paris, France
- Height: 1.69 m (5 ft 7 in)
- Weight: 57 kg (126 lb)

Sport
- Sport: Athletics
- Event: 1500–10,000 m
- Club: Pro Patria, Rotterdam; Metropolitan Club, Paris

Achievements and titles
- Personal bests: 1500 m – 4:04.8 (1913); 5000 m – 15:26.1 (1913); 10000 m – 33:08.4 (1908)
Medal record
Representing France
International Cross Country Championships
Silver medal – second place	1913 Juvisy-sur-Orge	Team
Bronze medal – third place	1913 Juvisy-sur-Orge	Individual

Jacques Keyser (12 October 1885 – 21 March 1954) was a middle-distance runner. Born in Paris, he was the son of a Dutch father and Belgian mother, and could compete for both France and the Netherlands. Keyser took part in the International Cross Country Championships in 1907 and 1911–1913 and won individual and team medals in 1913; his teams placed fourth in other three championships. He competed for the Netherlands at the 1908 Summer Olympics, but failed to reach the finals of the 1500 m and 5 mile races. Between 1910 and 1912 he broke the Dutch national records on the 1500 m (4.11,8), the mile (4.31,4), and the 5000 m (16.10,2), each remaining a record for over a decade.
