= Harry Hellawell =

American long-distance runner

Personal information
- Full name: Harry Hallas Hellawell
- Nationality: American
- Born: November 6, 1888
- Died: March 16, 1968 (aged 79)

Sport
- Sport: Long-distance running
- Event: 10,000 metres

Harry Hallas Hellawell (November 6, 1888 – March 16, 1968) was an American long-distance runner. He competed in the men's 10,000 metres at the 1912 Summer Olympics. He also competed in the cross country running race at the same Games. He competed for the South Paterson Athletic Club and New York Athletic Club.
