= Bror Fock =

Swedish long-distance runner

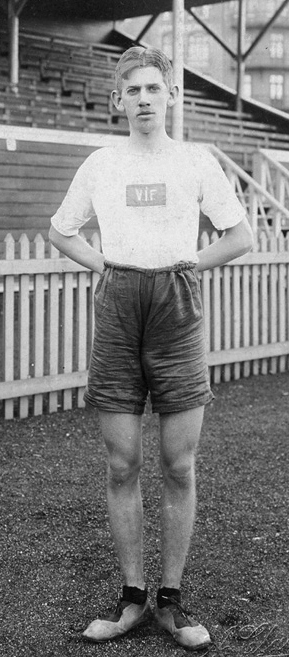

Personal information
- Born: 29 March 1888 Vänersborg, Sweden
- Died: 4 September 1964 (aged 76) Vänersborg, Sweden
- Height: 1.70 m (5 ft 7 in)
- Weight: 62 kg (137 lb)

Sport
- Sport: Athletics
- Event: 3000–10000 m
- Club: Vänersborgs IF

Achievements and titles
- Personal best(s): 5000 m – 15:29.2 (1912); 10000 m – 32:12.1 (1912)
Medal record
Representing Sweden
Olympic Games
Silver medal – second place	1912 Stockholm	3000 m team

Bror Karl Fock (29 March 1888 – 4 September 1964) was a Swedish long-distance runner who competed at the 1912 Summer Olympics held in Stockholm in the 3000 m, 10000 m and cross-country events. He finished seventh in the 3000 m, earning a silver medal with the Swedish team, and 17th in the cross country race. Although Sweden won the cross-country team event, Fock did not receive a medal because only the three best runners from each team were counted, while he was seventh.

In 1912, Fock briefly held the world record over 3000 m. He won the national 10000 m title in 1909, 1910 and 1912, placing second in 1911 and 1913.

Records
Preceded by (Finland) Hannes Kolehmainen	Men's 3000 m World Record Holder; 24 May 1912 – 12 July 1912	Succeeded by (Finland) Hannes Kolehmainen
