= George Wallach =

British athletics competitor (1883-1980)

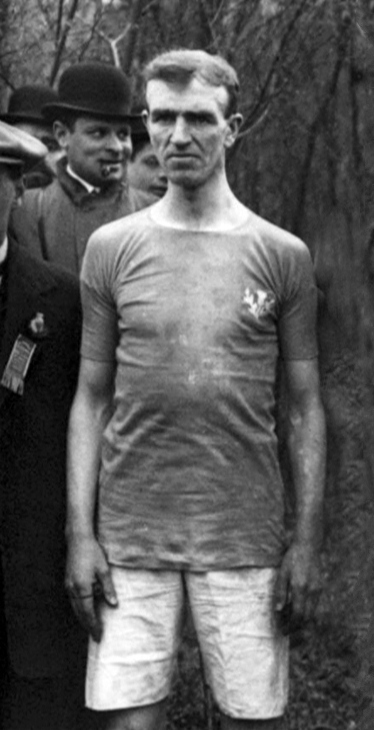

Personal information
- Born: 20 March 1883 Castle Douglas, Dumfries and Galloway, Scotland
- Died: 2 April 1980 (aged 97) Manchester, England

Sport
- Sport: Athletics
- Event(s): 5000 m, 10000 m
- Club: Edinburgh Southern Harriers

Achievements and titles
- Personal best(s): 5000 m – 15:24.0e (1912); 10000 m – 32:34.8 (1914); 10 miles – 52:48.6 (1914)
Medal record
Representing Scotland
International Cross Country Championships
Bronze medal – third place	1911 Caerleon	Team
Bronze medal – third place	1911 Caerleon	Individual
Silver medal – second place	1912 Edinburgh	Team (4 ind)
Bronze medal – third place	1913 Juvisy-sur-Orge	Team (8 ind)
Silver medal – second place	1914 Amersham	Team
Silver medal – second place	1914 Amersham	Individual
Bronze medal – third place	1922 Glasgow	Team (4 ind)
Bronze medal – third place	1924 Newcastle-on-Tyne	Team (24 ind)

George Curtis Locke Wallach (20 March 1883 – 2 April 1980) was a Scottish long-distance runner. He competed in the 10,000 m at the 1912 Summer Olympics but failed to reach the final.

Wallach was born in Scotland to Hermann Louis Waldemar Wallach, a German tinsmith, and Janet Wallach, a native Scot. In 1905, he moved to Lewes and in 1906 to Lancashire to work for the Manchester Evening News. While living in England, he competed at the Scotland Championships and won the 4 miles in 1911 and 1913 and the 10 miles in 1913–14, breaking the Scottish records. Wallach also won the Scottish cross-country championships in 1914 and 1922, and in 1910–1924, represented Scotland at the International Cross Country Championships, winning two individual and six team medals.
