= Gustave Lauvaux =

French runner

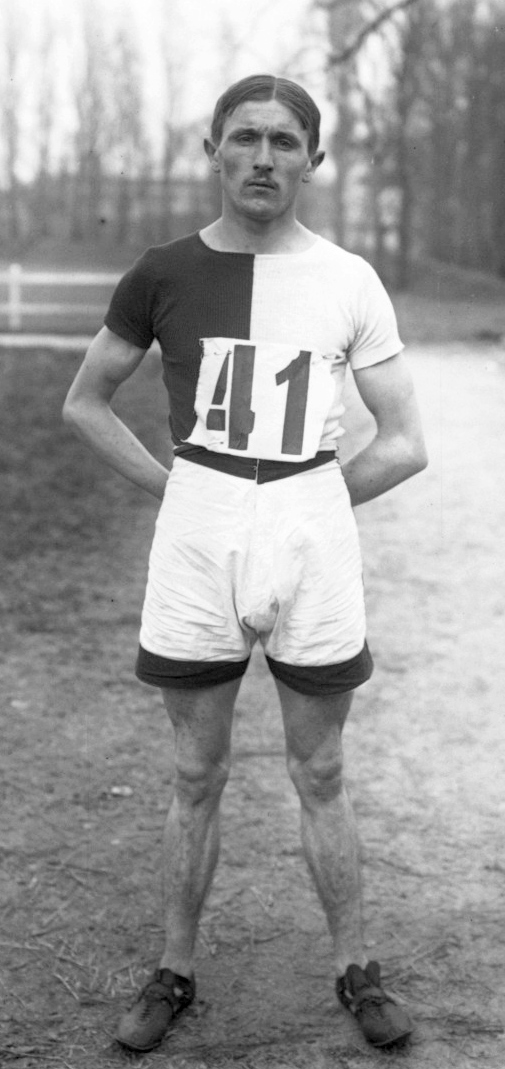
- Gustave Lauvaux in 1913

Personal information
- Born: 25 November 1892 Châlons-en-Champagne, France
- Died: 8 April 1970 (aged 77) Troyes, France
- Height: 1.79 m (5 ft 10 in)
- Weight: 67 kg (148 lb)

Sport
- Sport: Athletics
- Event: 1,500-10,000 m
- Club: CPN Châlons-sur-Marne, Châlons-en-Champagne

Achievements and titles
- Personal best: 1500 m – 4.10.2 (1913)

Gustave Henri Lauvaux (25 November 1892 – 8 April 1970) was a French runner. He competed at the 1920 Summer Olympics in the individual and team cross-country events and finished in 17th and 5th place, respectively. His younger brother Henri Lauvaux competed in the same events at the 1924 Olympics.
