= William Scott (runner) =

British long-distance runner

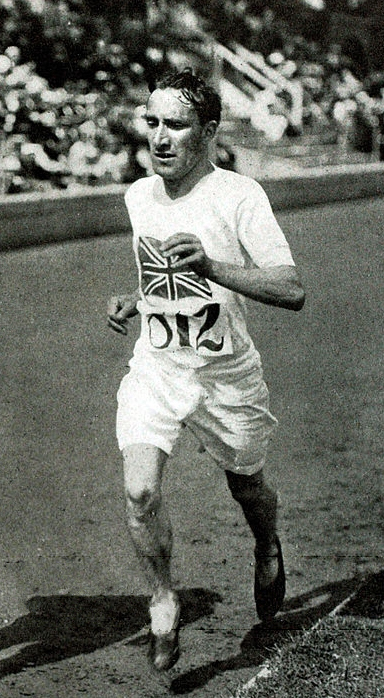
- William Scott at the 1912 Olympics

Personal information
- Born: 23 March 1884 Stretford, England
- Died: 8 December 1931 (aged 47) Pendleton, Greater Manchester, England

Sport
- Sport: Athletics
- Events: 5000 m, 10000 m
- Club: Salford Harriers

Achievements and titles
- Personal bests: 3 miles – 14:57.6 (1911); 5000 – 15:20.0 (1912); 6 miles – 30:47.6 (1912); 10000 m – 31:57.5 (1912)
Medal record
Representing England
International Cross Country Championships
Gold medal – first place	1910 Belfast	Team (6 ind.)
Gold medal – first place	1911 Caerleon	Team (4 ind.)
Gold medal – first place	1912 Edinburgh	Team
Silver medal – second place	1912 Edinburgh	Individual
Gold medal – first place	1913 Juvisy-sur-Orge	Team (9 ind.)

William Scott (23 March 1884 – 8 December 1931) was an English long-distance runner who competed at the 1912 Summer Olympics.

== Biography ==
At the 1912 Olympic Games Scott reached the finals of individual 10,000 m and cross-country races, but failed to complete them, partly due to a strong heat.

Scott competed in several AAA Championships and finished second to A. Edward Wood in the 10 mile event at the 1909 AAA Championships and was runner-up again behind Francis O'Neill at the 1910 AAA Championships.

He finally won the title at the 1911 AAA Championships before another success at the 1912 AAA Championships, and finished second in the national cross-country championship in 1911. He competed for England in the International Cross Country Championships in 1910–13.
