= Frederick Hibbins =

British long-distance runner

Medal record

Men's athletics

Representing United Kingdom

Olympic Games
Bronze medal – third place	1912 Stockholm	Team cross country

Frederick Newton Hibbins (23 March 1890 – 1969) was a British athlete who competed mainly in the cross country team. He was born and died in Stamford, Lincolnshire. He competed for Great Britain in the 1912 Summer Olympics held in Stockholm, Sweden in the Cross Country Team where he won the bronze medal with his teammates Ernest Glover and Thomas Humphreys.
