= 1932 International Cross Country Championships =

- Organisers: ICCU
- Edition: 25th
- Date: 20 March (men); 19 March (women)
- Host city: Brussels, Belgium (men); Croydon, Surrey, England (women)
- Venue: Hippodrome de Stockel (men)
- Events: 1 / 1
- Distances: 9 mi (14.5 km) men 1.9 mi (3.0 km) women
- Participation: 52 (men) / 12 (women) athletes from 6 (men) / 2 (women) nations

The 1932 International Cross Country Championships was held in Woluwe-Saint-Pierre, Brussels, Belgium, at the Hippodrome de Stockel on 20 March 1932. In addition, an unofficial women's championship was held a day earlier in Croydon, England on 19 March 1932. A report on the men's event was given in the Glasgow Herald.

Complete results for men, and for women (unofficial), medallists, and the results of British athletes were published.

== Medallists ==
Event	Gold		Silver		Bronze	
Individual
Men; 9 mi (14.5 km)	Tom Evenson; England	50:51	Jack Holden; England	51:06	Walter Beavers; England	51:15
Women; 1.9 mi (3.0 km)	Gladys Lunn; England	12:52	Suzanne Hedouin; France	13:06	Lilian Styles; England	13:07
Team
Men	England	21	France	69	Scotland	110
Women	England	14	France	22		

== Individual Race Results ==
=== Men's (9 mi / 14.5 km) ===
Rank	Athlete	Nationality	Time
1st place, gold medalist(s)	Tom Evenson	England	50:51
2nd place, silver medalist(s)	Jack Holden	England	51:06
3rd place, bronze medalist(s)	Walter Beavers	England	51:15
4	Jack Potts	England	51:19
5	George Bailey	England	51:27
6	Alex Burns	England	51:35
7	John Suttie Smith	Scotland	51:37
8	Jimmy Wood	Scotland	51:43
9	Roger Vigneron	France	51:52
10	Roger Rérolle	France	52:14
11	Georges Leclerc	France	52:22
12	Henri Lahitte	France	52:24
13	Emile le Denmat	France	52:26
14	André Angeard	France	52:37
15	Jan Linsen	Belgium	52:49
16	Harry McIntosh	Scotland	52:50
17	Fernand Le Heurteur	France	53:02
18	Ernest Ceney	England	53:04
19	Harry Gallivan	Wales	53:08
20	Donald Urquhart	Scotland	53:12
21	Maurice Maréchal	Belgium	53:24
22	Pierre Louchard	France	53:27
23	Ernie Thomas	Wales	53:31
24	William J Gunn	Scotland	53:37
25	Jack Winfield	England	
26	Harry McFall	Ireland	
27	Oscar van Rumst	Belgium	
28	Julien Serwy	Belgium	
29	Thomas Kinsella	Ireland	
30	John Dougall	England	
31	Louis Verschueren	Belgium	
32	Sam Palmer	Wales	
33	François Delaet	Belgium	
34	J. Dundas	Ireland	
35	James Petrie	Scotland	
36	Danny Phillips	Wales	
37	Ted Hopkins	Wales	
38	Andre Servaes	Belgium	
39	F. Mills	Ireland	
40	Willie Sutherland	Scotland	
41	R. Simons	Wales	
42	Tim Smythe	Ireland	
43	Roger Prévost	France	
44	Tom Murphy	Ireland	
45	Jean Bauwens	Belgium	
46	J. Bell	Ireland	
47	Patrick Peattie	Scotland	
48	M. O'Dowd	Ireland	
49	Joseph Orose	Belgium	
50	A.S. Stone	Wales	
51	Jack Prosser	Wales	
—	Maxi Stobbs	Scotland	DNF

=== Women's (1.9 mi / 3.0 km) ===
Rank	Athlete	Nationality	Time
1st place, gold medalist(s)	Gladys Lunn	England	12:52
2nd place, silver medalist(s)	Suzanne Hedouin	France	13:06
3rd place, bronze medalist(s)	Lilian Styles	England	13:07
4	Ruth Christmas	England	13:18
5	Suzanne Lenoir	France	13:29
6	Esther Raven	England	13:42
7	Mary French	England	13:44
8	Madeleine Massonneau	France	13:45
9	Sébastienne Guyot	France	13:50
10	Renée Trente	France	13:54
11	Martine Leroux	France	15:03
—	Madge Rossi	England	DNF

== Team Results ==
=== Men's ===
Rank	Country	Team	Points
1	England	Tom Evenson; Jack Holden; Walter Beavers; Jack Potts; George Bailey; Alex Burns	21
2	France	Roger Vigneron; Roger Rérolle; Georges Leclerc; Henri Lahitte; Emile le Denmat; André Angeard	69
3	Scotland	John Suttie Smith; Jimmy Wood; Harry McIntosh; Donald Urquhart; Walter Gunn; James Petrie	110
4	Belgium	Jan Linsen; Maurice Maréchal; Oscar van Rumst; Julien Serwy; Louis Verschueren; François Delaet	155
5	Wales	Harry Gallivan; Ernie Thomas; Sam Palmer; Danny Phillips; Ted Hopkins; R. Simons	188
6	Ireland	Harry McFall; Thomas Kinsella; J. Dundas; F. Mills; Tim Smythe; Tom Murphy	214

=== Women's ===
Rank	Country	Team	Points
1	England	Gladys Lunn; Lilian Styles; Ruth Christmas; Esther Raven	14
2	France	Suzanne Hedouin; Suzanne Lenoir; Madeleine Massonneau; Sébastienne Guyot	22

== Participation ==
=== Men's ===
An unofficial count yields the participation of 52 male athletes from 6 countries.

- Belgium (9)
- England (9)
- France (9)
- Ireland (8)
- Scotland (9)
- Wales (8)

=== Women's ===
An unofficial count yields the participation of 12 female athletes from 2 countries.

- England (6)
- France (6)

== See also ==
- 1932 in athletics (track and field)
