= Athletics at the 1930 British Empire Games – Men's 3 miles =

Men's 3 miles at the 1930 British Empire Games
- Venue: Civic Stadium
- Date: 21 August 1930
- Winning time: 14:27.4

Medalists
gold medal	Stan Tomlin	England
silver medal	Alex Hillhouse	Australia
bronze medal	Jack Winfield	England

The men's 3 miles event at the 1930 British Empire Games was held on 21 August at the Civic Stadium in Hamilton, Canada.

== Results ==
Rank	Name	Nationality	Time	Notes
1st place, gold medalist(s)	Stan Tomlin	England	14:27.4	
2nd place, silver medalist(s)	Alex Hillhouse	Australia	14:27.6e	+2 yd
3rd place, bronze medalist(s)	Jack Winfield	England	14:29.0e	
4	Robert Sutherland	Scotland	14:29.4e	
5	Tom Evenson	England	14:29.6e	
6	Brian Oddie	England	14:29.8e	
?	George Ball	Canada	?:??.?	
?	Fred Sargeant	Canada	?:??.?	
?	Walter Hornby	Canada	?:??.?	
?	Billy Savidan	New Zealand	DNF	
