= Athletics at the 1932 Summer Olympics – Men's 10,000 metres =

Men's 10,000 metres at the Games of the X Olympiad
- Venue: Los Angeles Memorial Coliseum
- Dates: July 31, 1932

Medalists
1st place, gold medalist(s)		Janusz Kusociński; Poland
2nd place, silver medalist(s)		Volmari Iso-Hollo; Finland
3rd place, bronze medalist(s)		Lasse Virtanen; Finland

The men's 10,000 metres long distance event at the 1932 Summer Olympics took place on July 31 at the Los Angeles Memorial Coliseum.

== Results ==
The race was contested in a final only format, no heats.

=== Final ===
Rank	Name	Nationality	Time	Notes
1st place, gold medalist(s)	Janusz Kusociński	Poland	30:11.4	OR
2nd place, silver medalist(s)	Volmari Iso-Hollo	Finland	30:12.6	
3rd place, bronze medalist(s)	Lasse Virtanen	Finland	30:35.0	
4	Billy Savidan	New Zealand	31:09.0	
5	Max Syring	Germany	31:35.0	
6	Jean-Gunnar Lindgren	Sweden	31:37.0	
7	Juan Morales	Mexico	32:03.0	
8	Clifford Bricker	Canada		
9	Masamichi Kitamoto	Japan		
10	Shoichiro Takenaka	Japan		
11	José Ribas	Argentina		
12	Fernando Cicarelli	Argentina		
13	Adalberto Cardoso	Brazil		

Key: OR = Olympic record; DNF = did not finish
