= Athletics at the 1930 British Empire Games – Men's 2 miles steeplechase =

Men's 2 miles steeplechase at the 1930 British Empire Games
- Venue: Civic Stadium
- Date: 23 August 1930
- Winning time: 9:52.0

Medalists
gold medal	George Bailey	England
silver medal	Alex Hillhouse	Australia
bronze medal	Vernon Morgan	England

The men's 2 miles steeplechase event at the 1930 British Empire Games was held on 23 August at the Civic Stadium in Hamilton, Canada.

== Results ==
Rank	Name	Nationality	Time	Notes
1st place, gold medalist(s)	George Bailey	England	9:52.0	
2nd place, silver medalist(s)	Alex Hillhouse	Australia	?:??.?	+40 yd
3rd place, bronze medalist(s)	Vernon Morgan	England	?:??.?	+65 yd
4	Art Wilkins	Canada	?:??.?	
5	Bill Reid	Canada	?:??.?	
6	Pete Suttie	Canada	?:??.?	
	Billy Savidan	New Zealand	DNS	
