= Athletics at the 1930 British Empire Games – Men's 6 miles =

Men's 6 miles at the 1930 British Empire Games
- Venue: Civic Stadium
- Date: 17 August 1930
- Winning time: 30:49.6

Medalists
gold medal	Billy Savidan	New Zealand
silver medal	Ernie Harper	England
bronze medal	Tom Evenson	England

The men's 6 miles event at the 1930 British Empire Games was held on 17 August at the Civic Stadium in Hamilton, Canada.

== Results ==
Rank	Name	Nationality	Time	Notes
1st place, gold medalist(s)	Billy Savidan	New Zealand	30:49.6	
2nd place, silver medalist(s)	Ernie Harper	England	31:01.6e	+60 yards
3rd place, bronze medalist(s)	Tom Evenson	England	??:??.?	
4	James Wood	Scotland	??:??.?	
5	Robert Sutherland	Scotland	??:??.?	
6	Billy Reynolds	Canada	??:??.?	
7	Jack Winfield	England	??:??.?	
8	Wilf McCluskey	Canada	??:??.?	
9	George Irwin	Canada	??:??.?	
10	Harold Webster	Canada	??:??.?	
	Stan Tomlin	England	DNF	
	Alex Hillhouse	Australia	DNF	
