= Roger Rérolle =

French long-distance runner

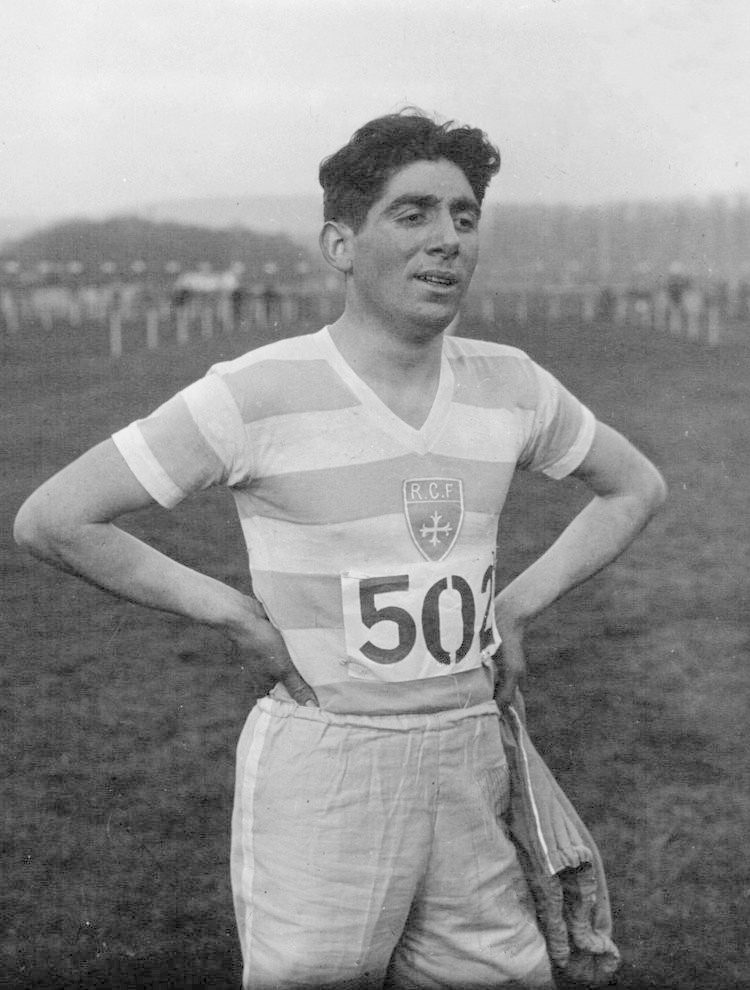
- Roger Rérolle in 1930

Personal information
- Born: 26 February 1909 Dijon, France
- Died: 30 December 1990 (aged 81) Clermont-Ferrand, France
- Height: 1.73 m (5 ft 8 in)
- Weight: 64 kg (141 lb)

Sport
- Sport: Athletics
- Event(s): Steeplechase, 5000 m, 10000 m
- Club: AS Montferrand, Clermont-Ferrand

Achievements and titles
- Personal best(s): 3000 mS – 9:25.0 (1936); 5000 m – 14:58.8 (1933); 10000 m – 31:32.0 (1933)
Medal record
Representing France
International Cross Country Championships
Silver medal – second place	1930 Leamington	Team (9 ind)
Silver medal – second place	1932 Brussels	Team (10 ind)
Silver medal – second place	1934 Ayr	Team (8 ind)
Bronze medal – third place	1935 Auteuil	Team (8 ind)
Silver medal – second place	1936 Blackpool	Team (6 ind)
Silver medal – second place	1937 Brussels	Team (8 ind)
Silver medal – second place	1938 Belfast	Team (8 ind)

Roger Rérolle (26 February 1909 – 30 December 1990) was a French long-distance runner. He competed at the 1936 Summer Olympics in the 3000 m steeplechase and finished in 11th place. He also competed at the International Cross Country Championships in 1929–1938 and won six silver and one bronze medals with the French team. His best individual result was sixth place in 1936.
