= 1936 International Cross Country Championships =

- Organisers: ICCU
- Edition: 29th
- Date: 28 March
- Host city: Blackpool, Lancashire, England
- Venue: The Stadium, Squires Gate
- Events: 1
- Distances: 9 mi (14.5 km)
- Participation: 54 athletes from 6 nations

The 1936 International Cross Country Championships was held in Blackpool, England, at The Stadium, Squires Gate on 28 March 1936. A report on the event was given in the Glasgow Herald.

Complete results, medalists, and the results of British athletes were published.

== Medalists ==
Event	Gold		Silver		Bronze	
Individual
Men; 9 mi (14.5 km)	William Eaton; England	47:38	Jack Holden; England	48:08	Alex Dow; Scotland	48:14
Team
Men	England	41	France	66	Scotland	112

== Individual Race Results ==
=== Men's (9 mi / 14.5 km) ===
Rank	Athlete	Nationality	Time
1st place, gold medalist(s)	William Eaton	England	47:38
2nd place, silver medalist(s)	Jack Holden	England	48:08
3rd place, bronze medalist(s)	Alex Dow	Scotland	48:14
4	André Lonlas	France	48:17
5	Alec Burns	England	48:35
6	Roger Rérolle	France	48:42
7	Oscar van Rumst	Belgium	48:45
8	Salem Amrouche	France	48:52
9	Maurice Baudouin	France	48:58
10	Jack Potts	England	49:10
11	Sam Dodd	England	49:13
12	Laurie Weatherill	England	49:15
13	Robbie Sutherland	Scotland	49:21
14	Fernand Le Heurteur	France	49:22
15	Bill Matthews	Wales	49:22
16	Alex Workman	Northern Ireland	49:31
17	Arthur Williams	Wales	49:34
18	Harry Gallivan	Wales	49:34
19	M. Gorman	Northern Ireland	49:36
20	Jim Flockhart	Scotland	49:39
21	Tom Evenson	England	49:44
22	Bill Wylie	Scotland	49:51
23	Harold Clark	England	49:56
24	John Suttie Smith	Scotland	50:02
25	Mohamed Bouali	France	50:05
26	Edouard Schroeven	Belgium	50:12
27	René Vincent	Belgium	50:20
28	Brahim Ben Mohamed	France	50:24
29	Joseph Guiomar	France	50:27
30	Jackie Campbell	Scotland	50:28
31	Johnny Glenholmes	Northern Ireland	50:33
32	Pierre Parent	Belgium	50:40
33	George Fox	Wales	50:41
34	Danny Phillips	Wales	50:51
35	Maurice van den Berghe	Belgium	51:02
36	Pierre Bajart	Belgium	51:03
37	Tom Carter	England	51:04
38	Charles Smith	Scotland	51:11
39	René van Broeck	Belgium	51:15
40	Bob Patterson	Northern Ireland	51:17
41	Tom Richards	Wales	51:18
42	Jimmy Nelson	Northern Ireland	51:23
43	Peter Plais	Northern Ireland	51:36
44	Louis Willemyns	Belgium	51:46
45	W.L. Raddon	Wales	51:55
46	Cliff Evans	Wales	52:10
47	Ken Harris	Wales	52:36
48	William J Gunn	Scotland	52:53
49	John Henning	Northern Ireland	52:56
50	Harry McFall	Northern Ireland	53:06
51	Bert Hermans	Belgium	53:17
52	Willie Sutherland	Scotland	53:42
—	Bareck Ben Daou	France	DNF
—	W.A. McCune	Northern Ireland	DNF

== Team Results ==
=== Men's ===
Rank	Country	Team	Points
1	England	William Eaton; Jack Holden; Alec Burns; Jack Potts; Sam Dodd; Laurie Weatherill	41
2	France	André Lonlas; Roger Rérolle; Salem Amrouche; Maurice Baudouin; Fernand Le Heurteur; Mohamed Bouali	66
3	Scotland	Alex Dow; Robbie Sutherland; Jim Flockhart; Bill Wylie; John Suttie Smith; Jackie Campbell	112
4	Wales	Bill Matthews; Arthur Williams; Harry Gallivan; George Fox; Danny Phillips; Tom Richards	158
5	Belgium	Oscar van Rumst; Edouard Schroeven; René Vincent; Pierre Parent; Maurice van den Berghe; Pierre Bajart	163
6	Northern Ireland	Alex Workman; M. Gorman; Johnny Glenholmes; Bob Patterson; Jimmy Nelson; Peter Plais	191

== Participation ==
An unofficial count yields the participation of 54 athletes from 6 countries.

- Belgium (9)
- England (9)
- France (9)
- Northern Ireland (9)
- Scotland (9)
- Wales (9)
