= 1937 International Cross Country Championships =

- Organisers: ICCU
- Edition: 30th
- Date: 20 March
- Host city: Brussels, Belgium
- Venue: Hippodrome de Stockel
- Events: 1
- Distances: 9 mi (14.5 km)
- Participation: 54 athletes from 6 nations

The 1937 International Cross Country Championships was held in Woluwe-Saint-Pierre, Brussels, Belgium, at the Hippodrome de Stockel on 20 March 1937. A report on the event was given in the Glasgow Herald.

Complete results, medalists, and the results of British athletes were published.

== Medalists ==
Event	Gold		Silver		Bronze	
Individual
Men; 9 mi (14.5 km)	Jim Flockhart; Scotland	49:50	André Sicard; France	50:03	James Ginty; England	50:13
Team
Men	England	55	France	70	Belgium	98

== Individual Race Results ==
=== Men's (9 mi / 14.5 km) ===
Rank	Athlete	Nationality	Time
1st place, gold medalist(s)	Jim Flockhart	Scotland	49:50
2nd place, silver medalist(s)	André Sicard	France	50:03
3rd place, bronze medalist(s)	James Ginty	England	50:13
4	Jack Potts	England	50:26
5	Alec Burn	England	50:27
6	Edouard Schroeven	Belgium	50:38
7	Oscar van Rumst	Belgium	50:54
8	Roger Rérolle	France	50:56
9	André Lonlas	France	51:05
10	Bill Matthews	Wales	51:10
11	Jean Chapelle	Belgium	51:10
12	Harold Clark	England	51:13
13	Arthur Bourton	England	51:14
14	René Lécuron	France	51:24
15	Joseph Guiomar	France	51:25
16	Harry Gallivan	Wales	51:33
17	Alex Dow	Scotland	51:40
18	Tommy Lee	England	51:50
19	Vic Draper	England	51:55
20	Robbie Sutherland	Scotland	52:00
21	Pierre Bajart	Belgium	52:13
22	Roger Lachaud	France	52:18
23	Emmet Farrell	Scotland	52:19
24	Ivor Brown	Wales	52:25
25	Bert Hermans	Belgium	52:28
26	George Bailey	England	52:42
27	Davy Cannavan	Northern Ireland	52:47
28	Albert van Meenen	Belgium	52:53
29	W.A. McCune	Northern Ireland	52:55
30	Bill Wylie	Scotland	53:04
31	Charles Smith	Scotland	53:04
32	Walter Hinde	Scotland	53:09
33	James Andrews	Northern Ireland	53:12
34	René Lebon	France	53:18
35	Arthur Williams	Wales	53:23
36	M. Gorman	Northern Ireland	53:29
37	Jean Coisne	Belgium	53:33
38	Danny Phillips	Wales	53:35
39	Eddie Cooper	Wales	54:03
40	Emile Verschaetse	Belgium	54:39
41	Allan Whitecross	Scotland	54:41
42	Léopold Monceyron	France	55:10
43	Tom Richards	Wales	55:42
44	Bob Patterson	Northern Ireland	56:09
45	Alex Workman	Northern Ireland	56:11
46	Dan Gillespie	Northern Ireland	56:12
47	Elwood Jones	Wales	56:28
48	Godfrey Clarke	Wales	56:40
49	Harry McFall	Northern Ireland	56:47
—	Jack Holden	England	DNF
—	Mohamed Ben Larbi	France	DNF
—	Jack Parker	Northern Ireland	DNF
—	Victor Honorez	Belgium	DNF
—	William Kennedy	Scotland	DNF

== Team Results ==
=== Men's ===
Rank	Country	Team	Points
1	England	James Ginty; Jack Potts; Alec Burns; Harold Clark; Arthur Bourton; Tommy Lee	55
2	France	André Sicard; Roger Rérolle; André Lonlas; René Lécuron; Joseph Guiomar; Roger Lachaud	70
3	Belgium	Edouard Schroeven; Oscar van Rumst; Jean Chapelle; Pierre Bajart; Bert Hermans; Albert van Meenen	98
4	Scotland	Jim Flockhart; Alex Dow; Robbie Sutherland; Emmet Farrell; Bill Wylie; Charles Smith	122
5	Wales	Bill Matthews; Harry Gallivan; Ivor Brown; Arthur Williams; Danny Phillips; Eddie Cooper	162
6	Northern Ireland	Davy Cannavan; W.A. McCune; James Andrews; M. Gorman; Bob Patterson; Alex Workman	214

== Participation ==
An unofficial count yields the participation of 54 athletes from 6 countries.

- Belgium (9)
- England (9)
- France (9)
- Northern Ireland (9)
- Scotland (9)
- Wales (9)
