= Athletics at the 1932 Summer Olympics – Men's 5000 metres =

Men's 5000 metres at the Games of the X Olympiad
- Venue: Los Angeles Memorial Coliseum
- Dates: August 2 and August 5, 1932
- Competitors: 18 from 11 nations

Medalists
1st place, gold medalist(s)		Lauri Lehtinen; Finland
2nd place, silver medalist(s)		Ralph Hill; United States
3rd place, bronze medalist(s)		Lasse Virtanen; Finland

The men's 5000 metres event was part of the track and field athletics programme at the 1932 Summer Olympics. The competition was held on Tuesday, August 2, 1932, and on Friday, August 5, 1932.

== Records ==
These were the standing world and Olympic records (in minutes) prior to the 1932 Summer Olympics.

World record	14:17.0	(Finland) Lauri Lehtinen	Helsinki (FIN)	June 19, 1932
Olympic record	14:31.2	(Finland) Paavo Nurmi	Paris (FRA)	July 10, 1924

In the final Lauri Lehtinen set a new Olympic record with 14:30.0 minutes.

== Results ==
=== Semifinals ===
Both semi-finals were held on Tuesday, August 2, 1932, and started at 4:45 p.m.

The best seven finishers of every heat qualified for the final.

Semifinal 1

Place	Athlete	Time	Qual.
1	Ralph Hill (USA)	14:59.6	Q
2	Lauri Lehtinen (FIN)	15:05.5	Q
3	Jean-Gunnar Lindgren (SWE)	15:06.0	Q
4	Lauri Virtanen (FIN)	15:06.4	Q
5	Billy Savidan (NZL)	15:08.2	Q
6	Alex Hillhouse (AUS)	15:14.0	Q
7	Daniel Dean (USA)	15:19.6	Q
8	George Bailey (GBR)		
9	Masamichi Kitamoto (JPN)		
10	Juan Morales (MEX)	DNF	

Semifinal 2

Place	Athlete	Time	Qual.
1	Alec Burns (GBR)	15:25.8	Q
2	Paul Rekers (USA)	15:34.6	Q
3	Erik Pettersson (SWE)	15:36.4	Q
4	Roger Rochard (FRA)	15:37.8	Q
5	Scotty Rankine (CAN)	15:39.6	Q
6	Max Syring (GER)	15:48.5	Q
7	Shoichiro Takenaka (JPN)	15:56.0	Q
8	Valentín González (MEX)	16:00.0	

=== Final ===
The final was held on Friday, August 5, 1932, and started at 3:15 p.m.

In a controversial move Lehtinen blocked Hill when he tried to pass Lehtinen on the final straight. Both runners broke the Olympic record but Lehtinen finished 30 cm in front.

Place	Athlete	Time
1st place, gold medalist(s)	Lauri Lehtinen (FIN)	14:30.0 OR
2nd place, silver medalist(s)	Ralph Hill (USA)	14:30.0
3rd place, bronze medalist(s)	Lauri Virtanen (FIN)	14:44.0
4	Billy Savidan (NZL)	14:49.6
5	Jean-Gunnar Lindgren (SWE)	14:54:7
6	Max Syring (GER)	14:59.0
7	Alec Burns (GBR)	15:04.4
8	Daniel Dean (USA)	15:08.5
9	Erik Pettersson (SWE)	15:13.4
10	Alex Hillhouse (AUS)	15:15.0
11	Scotty Rankine (CAN)	15:24.0
12	Shoichiro Takenaka (JPN)	17:20.0
—	Paul Rekers (USA)	DNF
—	Roger Rochard (FRA)	DNF
