= Erik Pettersson =

Erik Pettersson may refer to:

- Erik Pettersson (athlete) (1906–1974), Swedish Olympic athlete
- Erik Pettersson (bandy, born 1990) (born 1990), Swedish bandy player
- Erik Pettersson (bandy, born 1995) (born 1995), Swedish bandy player
- Erik Pettersson (weightlifter) (1890–1975), Swedish Olympic weightlifter
- Erik Albert Pettersson (1885–1960), Swedish Olympic weightlifter
- Erik Pettersson (cyclist) (born 1944), Swedish Olympic cyclist

== See also ==
- Erik Petersen (disambiguation)
- Eric Peterson (born 1946), Canadian stage and television actor
- Eric Peterson (musician) (born 1964), American guitarist
