= Kitamoto (surname) =

Kitamoto (written: 北本) is a Japanese surname. Notable people with the surname include:

- Ayako Kitamoto (北本 綾子; born 1983), Japanese women's footballer
- Kunie Kitamoto (北本 久仁衛; born 1981), Japanese footballer
- Masamichi Kitamoto (北本 正路; 1909–1995), Japanese long-distance runner
- Shinobu Kitamoto (北本 忍; born 1977), Japanese sprint canoeist
