= Erik Petersen =

Erik Petersen may refer to:

- Erik Petersen (rower) (1939–2025), Danish Olympic rower
- Erik Petersen (musician), founder of Philadelphia band Mischief Brew
- Erik Petersen (footballer), Danish footballer who was the top-goalscorer of the 1939 Danish football championship

== See also ==
- Erik Pedersen (born 1967), former Norwegian footballer
- Erik Pedersen (ice hockey) (born 1955), Norwegian ice hockey player
- Erik Bue Pedersen (born 1952), Danish handball player
- Eric Petersen, American actor
- Eric Peterson, Canadian actor
- Eric Peterson (musician), American guitarist
- Erik Peterson (disambiguation)
- Erik Pettersson (disambiguation)
