= Takenaka =

Takenaka may refer to:

- Takenaka Corporation, Japanese architecture and construction company

== People with the surname ==
- Heizo Takenaka (竹中 平蔵, born 1951), Japanese economist and former Minister of Internal Affairs and Communications
- Hisato Takenaka (竹中 尚人, born 1955), better known as Char, Japanese musician
- Miho Takenaka (竹中 美穂, born 1984), Japanese artistic gymnast
- Shoichiro Takenaka (竹中 正一郎, 1912–1997), Japanese long-distance runner
- Naoto Takenaka (竹中 直人, Born 1956)
- Takenaka Shigeharu, Japanese samurai

== People with the given name ==
- Shibata Takenaka (柴田 剛中, 1823–1877), Japanese diplomat
