= Ralph Hill (runner) =

American runner and Olympian

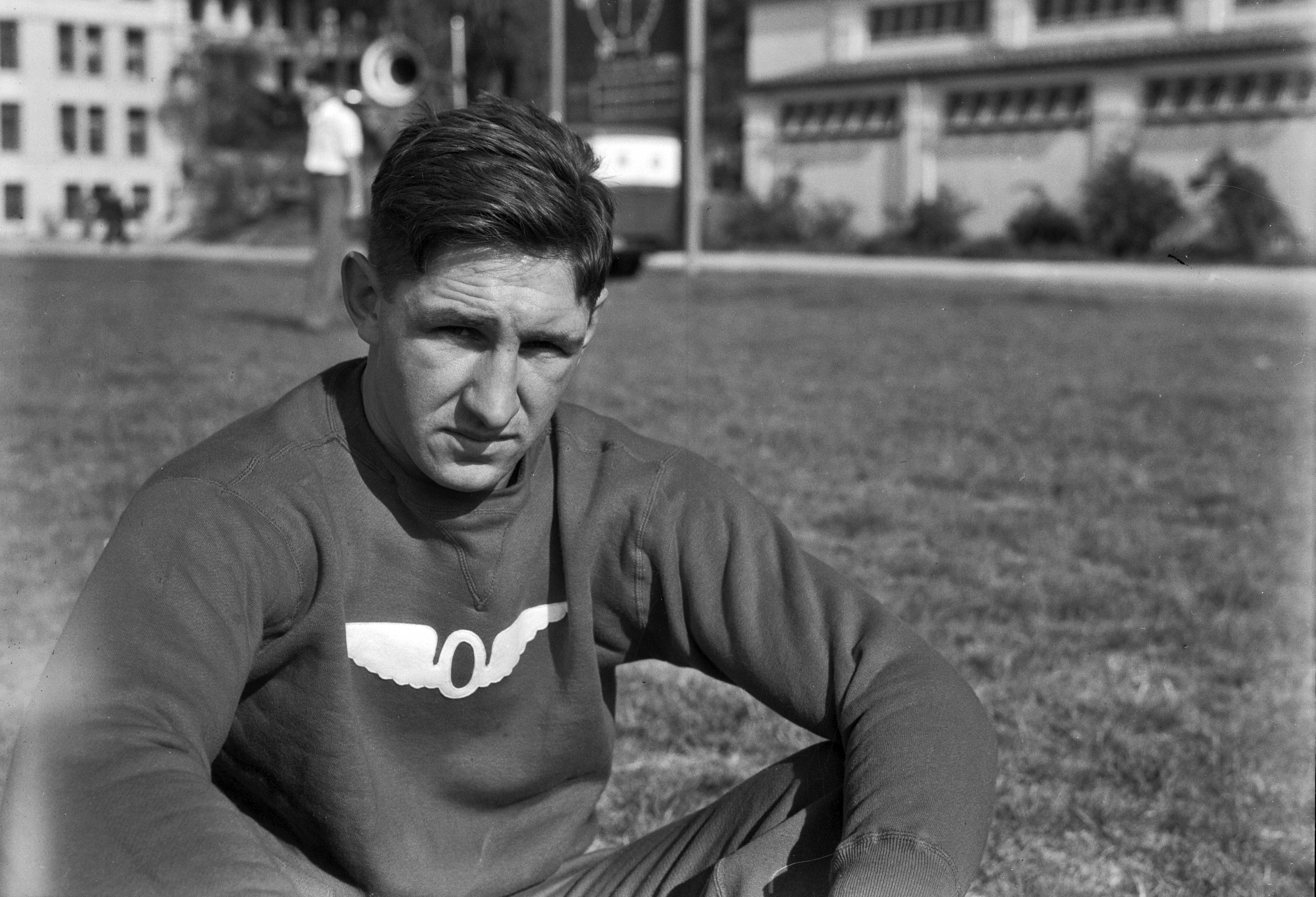
- Hill in 1932

Personal information
- Born: December 26, 1908 Klamath Falls, Oregon, U.S.
- Died: October 17, 1994 (aged 85) Klamath Falls, Oregon, U.S.
- Education: University of Oregon
- Height: 180 cm (5 ft 11 in)
- Weight: 66 kg (146 lb)

Sport
- Sport: Athletics
- Events: Mile, 5000 m
- Club: Olympic Club, San Francisco

Achievements and titles
- Personal bests: Mile – 4:12.4 (1930); 5000 m – 14:30.0 (1932)
Medal record
Representing the United States
Olympic Games
Silver medal – second place	1932 Los Angeles	5000 metres

Ralph Anthony Hill (December 26, 1908 – October 17, 1994) was an American runner. He set an American record over the mile in 1930 and won a silver medal in the 5000 m event at the 1932 Olympics.

Hill studied at the University of Oregon when competing in the 1932 Summer Olympics in Los Angeles on the 5000 m. In an exciting race on August 5, 1932, he came in second behind Lauri Lehtinen, with each runner recording a time of 14:30.0. The judges deliberated for an hour before deciding not to disqualify Lehtinen, who had appeared to block Hill twice. Hill refused to file a protest, stating that he believed Lehtinen's obstruction was accidental. Lauri Virtanen came in third, 14 seconds behind.

After college, Hill made a career of farming near Klamath Falls. The local Henley High School renamed its football field in September 1992 after its alumnus Hill.
