= James Ginty (athlete) =

British middle-distance runner

Personal information
- Nationality: British
- Born: 4 April 1908 Haslingden, Bacup, England
- Died: 17 December 1999 Lancashire, England

Sport
- Sport: Athletics
- Event: Middle-distance / Steeplechase
- Club: Belgrave Harriers

James Ginty (4 April 1908 – 17 December 1999) was a British middle-distance runner who competed at the 1936 Summer Olympics.

== Biography ==
Ginty finished second behind George Bailey in the steeplechase event at the 1935 AAA Championships.

After finishing second behind Tom Evenson in the steeplechase event at the 1936 AAA Championships, he was selected to represent Great Britain at the 1936 Olympic Games held in Berlin, where he competed in the men's 3000 metres steeplechase competition.
