= Robert Sutherland (athlete) =

Scottish athlete

Personal information
- Nationality: British (Scottish)
- Born: c.1903

Sport
- Sport: Athletics
- Events: Middle–distance, cross country
- Club: Garscube Harriers; British Army (Carabiniers); Birchfield Harriers

Robert R. Sutherland (c.1903 – date of death unknown) was a track and field athlete from Scotland who competed at the 1930 British Empire Games (now Commonwealth Games).

== Biography ==
Sutherland was a member of the Garscube Harriers and he won the 4 miles title at the 1930 Scottish AAA Championships.

Leaving Scotland on the Anchor-Donaldson liner Audania, he arrived in Canada and represented the Scottish Empire Games team at the 1930 British Empire Games in Hamilton, Ontario, Canada, participating in three events, the 1 mile race. the 3 miles race and the 6 miles race. At the time of the Games he was living at the 3rd Carabiniers barracks in Canterbury and was a soldier by profession.

Sutherland finished third behind Alec Burns and rival James Wood in the 4 miles race at the 1931 AAA Championships. Two years later he finished runner-up to in the 6 miles behind Jack Holden but ahead of Wood at the 1933 AAA Championships.

Sutherland was a three-times Scottish cross-country championships silver medallist, 14 times Army champion and led the Birchfield Harriers to seven cross country team championships.
