= Adalberto Cardoso =

Brazilian long-distance runner

Personal information
- Nationality: Brazilian
- Born: 21 December 1905
- Died: 11 January 1972 (aged 66)

Sport
- Sport: Long-distance running
- Event: 10,000 metres

Adalberto Cardoso (21 December 1905 – 11 January 1972) was a Brazilian long-distance runner. He competed in the men's 10,000 metres at the 1932 Summer Olympics.
