= Georges Leclerc =

French athletics competitor

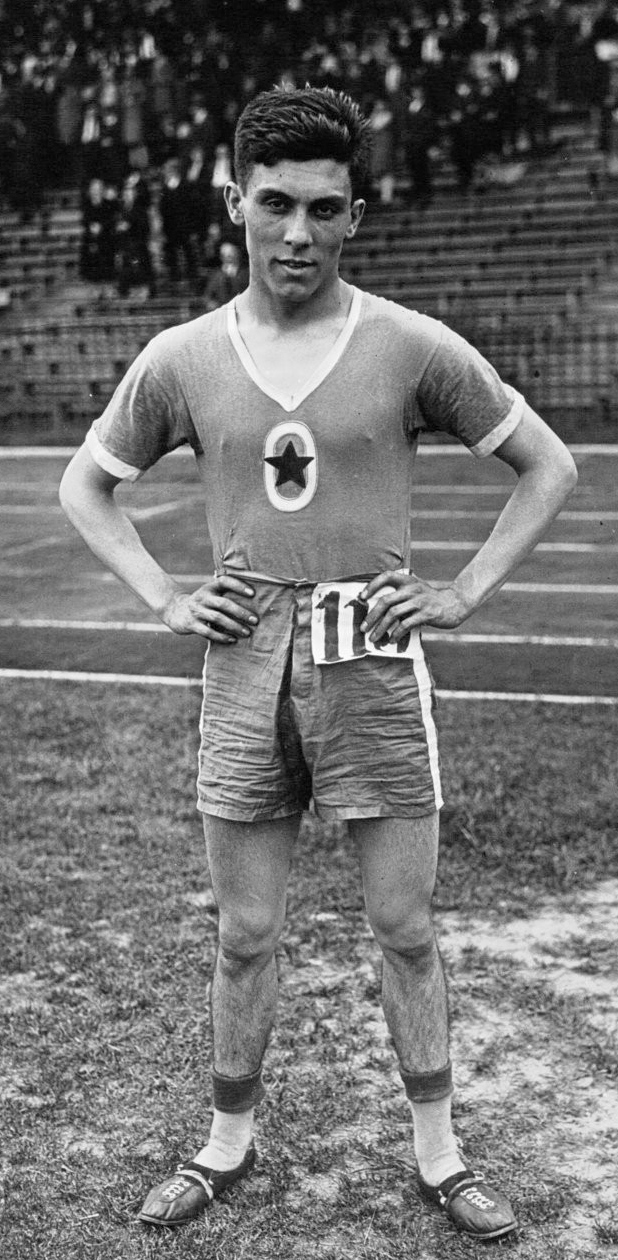
- Georges Leclerc in 1927

Personal information
- Born: 19 December 1903 Paris, France
- Died: 11 June 1973 (aged 68)

Sport
- Sport: Athletics
- Event(s): Mile, steeplechase, 5000 m
- Club: Olympique de Paris

Achievements and titles
- Personal best(s): Mile – 4:23.2 (1925); 3000 mS – 9:36.8 (1929); 5000 m – 14:58.8 (1933)
Medal record
Representing France
International Cross Country Championships
Gold medal – first place	1927 Caerleon	Team (17 ind)
Gold medal – first place	1929 Vincennes	Team (9 ind)
Silver medal – second place	1932 Brussels	Team (11 ind)

Georges Leclerc (19 December 1904 – 11 June 1973) was a French runner. He competed in the steeplechase at the 1924 Summer Olympics, but failed to reach the final. He also took part in the International Cross Country Championships in 1926–1929 and 1931–1932, and won two gold and one silver medals with the French team.
