= 1938 International Cross Country Championships =

- Organisers: ICCU
- Edition: 31st
- Date: 2 April (men); 12 March (women)
- Host city: Belfast, Ulster, Northern Ireland } (men); Lille, Nord-Pas-de-Calais, France (women)
- Venue: Royal Ulster Showground (men)
- Events: 1 / 1
- Distances: 9 mi (14.5 km) men / 1.9 mi (3.0 km) women
- Participation: 63 (men) / 18 (women) athletes from 7 (men) / 3 (women) nations

The 1938 International Cross Country Championships was held in Belfast, Northern Ireland, at the Royal Ulster Showground on 2 April 1938. In addition, an unofficial women's championship was held three weeks earlier in Lille, France, on 12 March 1938. A report on the men's event was given in the Glasgow Herald.

Complete results for men, and for women (unofficial), medalists, and the results of British athletes were published.

== Medalists ==
Event	Gold		Silver		Bronze	
Individual
Men; 9 mi (14.5 km)	Jack Emery; England	49:57	Jean Chapelle; Belgium	50:16	Sam Palmer; Wales	50:36
Women; 1.9 mi (3.0 km)	Evelyne Forster; England	12:40	Dolly Harris-Roden; England	12:48	Jeanne Pousset; Belgium	12:51
Team
Men	England	43	France	96	Belgium	117
Women	England	12	France	30	Belgium	36

== Individual Race Results ==
=== Men's (9 mi / 14.5 km) ===
Rank	Athlete	Nationality	Time
1st place, gold medalist(s)	Jack Emery	England	49:57
2nd place, silver medalist(s)	Jean Chapelle	Belgium	50:16
3rd place, bronze medalist(s)	Sam Palmer	Wales	50:36
4	Jack Potts	England	50:48
5	Jean Wattiau	France	50:49
6	Jack Holden	England	50:54
7	Ivor Brown	Wales	50:56
8	Emmet Farrell	Scotland	50:59
9	Bertie Robertson	England	51:00
10	Frank Cummins	Ireland	51:03
11	Vic Draper	England	51:09
12	Alec Burns	England	51:14
13	Salem Amrouche	France	51:20
14	Jean Lalanne	France	51:24
15	Albert van Meenen	Belgium	51:30
16	Oscar van Rumst	Belgium	51:31
17	Maurice Baudouin	France	51:34
18	Pierre Bajart	Belgium	51:36
19	Davy Cannavan	Northern Ireland	51:41
20	W.A. McCune	Northern Ireland	51:46
21	Joseph Guiomar	France	51:47
22	Bill Matthews	Wales	51:48
23	Harry Gallivan	Wales	51:51
24	Archie Craig Jr.	Scotland	52:00
25	Norman Jones	England	52:02
26	Roger Rérolle	France	52:07
27	Alex Dow	Scotland	52:08
28	James O'Connor	Ireland	52:12
29	Frank Reeve	England	52:14
30	André-Louis Laforge	France	52:16
31	Frans Vandersteen	Belgium	52:21
32	Tom Lamb	Scotland	52:22
33	André Sicard	France	52:23
34	Johnny Glenholmes	Northern Ireland	52:32
35	René van Broeck	Belgium	52:35
36	Peter Allwell	Scotland	52:38
37	Jim Flockhart	Scotland	52:40
38	Dennis Morgan	Wales	52:44
39	M. Gorman	Northern Ireland	52:45
40	Elwood Jones	Wales	52:46
41	Frank Marsland	England	52:46
42	James Andrews	Northern Ireland	52:47
43	George Fox	Wales	52:51
44	James Freeland	Scotland	52:57
45	Tom Gibson	Scotland	53:02
46	Alex Workman	Northern Ireland	53:03
47	Alex Donnett	Scotland	53:05
48	Mike Finglass	Ireland	53:19
49	Tim Smythe	Ireland	53:23
50	Dan Gillespie	Northern Ireland	53:29
51	Jack Parker	Northern Ireland	53:29
52	Eammon Jones	Ireland	53:43
53	Bert Hermans	Belgium	53:44
54	J. McCormick	Northern Ireland	53:47
55	Pierre Willems	Belgium	53:48
56	Dougie Coard	Ireland	54:05
57	Albert Donfut	Belgium	54:06
58	Tom Winslade	Wales	54:17
59	Tom Hopkins	Ireland	54:21
60	Gordon Edgar	Ireland	54:24
61	Roger Lachaud	France	54:28
62	Sam Grey	Ireland	54:59
—	J. Pearce	Wales	DNF

=== Women's (1.9 mi / 3.0 km) ===
Rank	Athlete	Nationality	Time
1st place, gold medalist(s)	Evelyne Forster	England	12:40
2nd place, silver medalist(s)	Dolly Harris-Roden	England	12:48
3rd place, bronze medalist(s)	Jeanne Pousset	Belgium	12:51
4	Mary Clarke	England	12:54
5	Lilian Styles	England	12:58
6	Dorothy Franklin	England	13:04
7	Elisabeth Lemonnier	France	13:05
8	Lily Lotte	France	13:15
9	Renée Trente-Ganault	France	13:22
10	Lucienne Tostain-Bouin	France	13:24
11	H. van Mol	Belgium	13:35
12	Jacqueline Gruner	France	13:52
13	Germaine Vincent	France	13:58
14	Y. de Linge	Belgium	13:59
15	M. Simon	Belgium	14:07
16	G. Lormiez	Belgium	14:20
17	Margaret Armstrong	England	14:32
18	G. Groux	Belgium	

== Team Results ==
=== Men's ===
Rank	Country	Team	Points
1	England	Jack Emery; Jack Potts; Jack Holden; Bertie Robertson; Vic Draper; Alec Burns	43
2	France	Jean Wattiau; Salem Amrouche; Jean Lalanne; Maurice Baudouin; Joseph Guiomar; Roger Rérolle	96
3	Belgium	Jean Chapelle; Albert van Meenen; Oscar van Rumst; Pierre Bajart; Frans Vandersteen; René van Broeck	117
4	Wales	Sam Palmer; Ivor Brown; Bill Matthews; Harry Gallivan; Dennis Morgan; Elwood Jones	133
5	Scotland	Emmet Farrell; Archie Craig Jr. Alex Dow; Tom Lamb; Peter Allwell; Jim Flockhart	164
6	Northern Ireland	Davy Cannavan; W.A. McCune; Johnny Glenholmes; M. Gorman; James Andrews; Alex Workman	200
7	Ireland	Frank Cummins; James O'Connor; Mike Finglass; Tim Smythe; Eammon Jones; Dougie Coard	243

=== Women's ===
Rank	Country	Team	Points
1	England	Evelyne Forster; Dolly Harris-Roden; Mary Clarke; Lilian Styles	12
2	France	Elisabeth Lemonnier; Lily Lotte; Renée Trente-Ganault; Lucienne Tostain-Bouin	30
3	Belgium	Jeanne Pousset; H. van Mol; Y. de Linge; M. Simon	36

== Participation ==
=== Men's ===
An unofficial count yields the participation of 63 male athletes from 7 countries.

- Belgium (9)
- England (9)
- France (9)
- Ireland (9)
- Northern Ireland (9)
- Scotland (9)
- Wales (9)

=== Women's ===
An unofficial count yields the participation of 18 female athletes from 3 countries.

- Belgium (6)
- England (6)
- France (6)
