= James Wood (athlete) =

Scottish athlete

Personal information
- Nickname: Ginger
- Nationality: British (Scottish)
- Born: 1 July 1906 Edinburgh, Scotland
- Died: 28 December 1999 (aged 93) Edinburgh, Scotland

Sport
- Sport: Athletics
- Events: Long-distance, cross-country
- Club: Heriot's Former Pupils AC

James Ford Wood nicknamed Ginger (1 July 1906 – 28 December 1999) was a track and field athlete from Scotland who competed at the 1930 British Empire Games (now Commonwealth Games).

== Biography ==
Wood was educated at George Heriot's School and was a member of the Heriot's Former Pupils Athletics Club and finished runner-up behind Robert Sutherland in the 4 miles title at the 1930 Scottish AAA Championships.

Leaving Scotland on the Anchor-Donaldson liner Audania, he arrived in Canada and represented the Scottish Empire Games team at the 1930 British Empire Games in Hamilton, Ontario, Canada, participating in one event, the 6 miles race. At the time of the Games she was living at 163 Gilmore Place in Edinburgh and was a hairdesser by profession.

Wood finished second behind Alec Burns but ahead of rival Robert Sutherland in the 4 miles race at the 1931 AAA Championships. The following year in 1932, he then became the British 10 miles champion after winning the title at the 1932 AAA Championships before finishing third in the 6 miles behind Jack Holden and Sutherland at the 1933 AAA Championships.

Wood won the Scottish AAA 10 miles title twice and was East of Scotland cross-country champion in 1928.
