= 1938 European Athletics Championships – Men's 10,000 metres =

European Athletics Championships

Men's 10,000 metres at the European Athletics Championships

The men's 10,000 metres at the 1938 European Athletics Championships was held in Paris, France, at Stade Olympique de Colombes on 5 September 1938.

== Medalists ==
Gold	Ilmari Salminen; Finland
Silver	Giuseppe Beviacqua; Italy
Bronze	Max Syring; Germany

== Results ==
=== Final ===
5 September

Rank	Name	Nationality	Time	Notes
1st place, gold medalist(s)	Ilmari Salminen	Finland	30:52.4	CR
2nd place, silver medalist(s)	Giuseppe Beviacqua	Italy	30:53.2	NR
3rd place, bronze medalist(s)	Max Syring	Germany	30:57.8	
4	Jenő Szilágyi	Hungary	30:58.6	NR
5	Thore Tillman	Sweden	31:06.6	
6	János Kelen	Hungary	31:16.6	
7	Giuseppe Lippi	Italy	31:51.6	
8	André Sicard	France	32:09.6	
9	Erik Larsson	Sweden	32:11.2	
10	Alexis Dressus	France	32:22.2	

== Participation ==
According to an unofficial count, 10 athletes from 6 countries participated in the event.

- Finland (1)
- France (2)
- Germany (1)
- Hungary (2)
- Italy (2)
- Sweden (2)
