= Thore Tillman =

Swedish long-distance runner

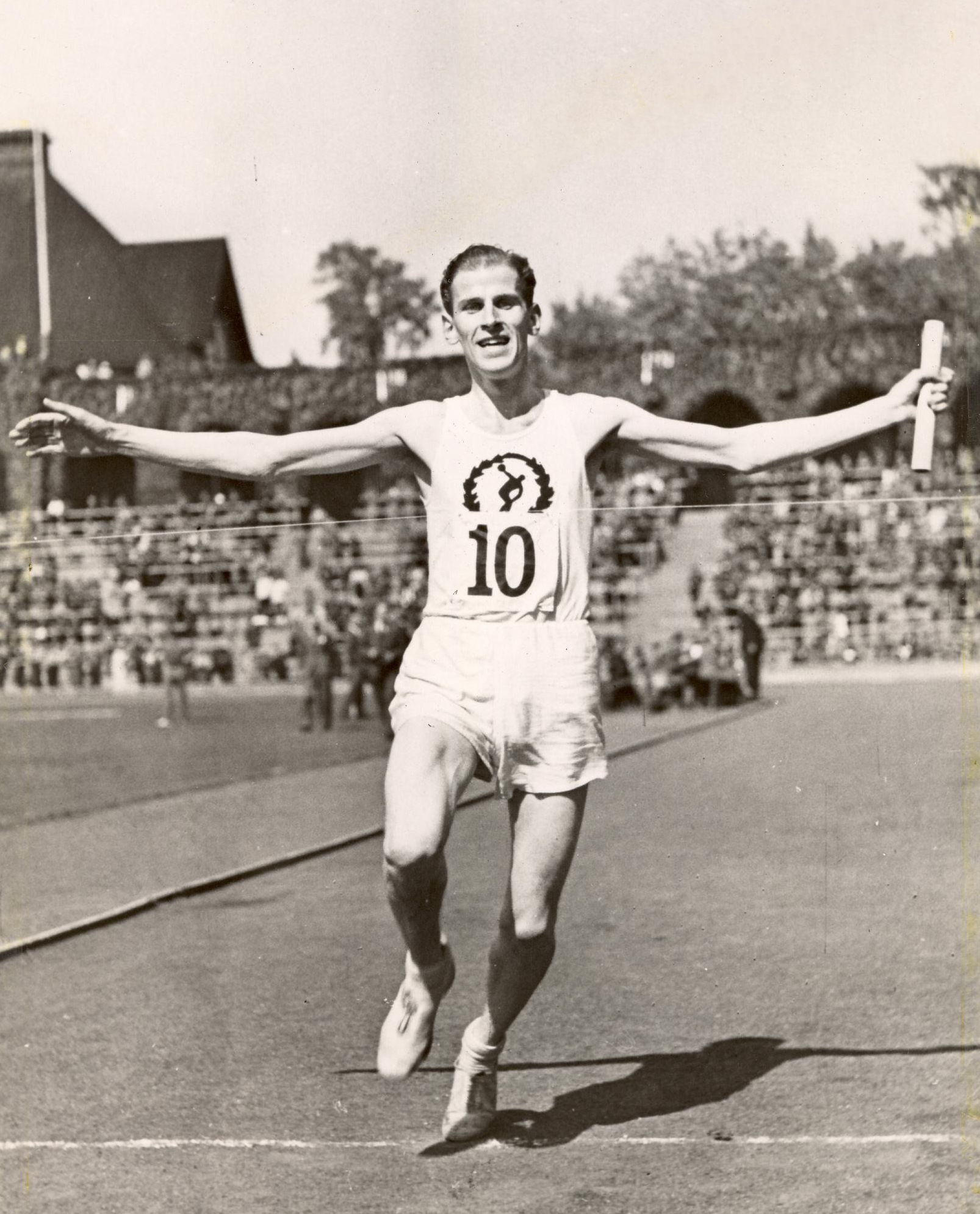
- Tillman in 1937

Personal information
- Born: 9 August 1915
- Died: 2004 (aged 88–89)

Sport
- Sport: Athletics
- Event(s): 5000 m, 10000 m
- Club: IF Thor; Fagersta AIK

Achievements and titles
- Personal best(s): 5000 m – 14:24.8 (1939); 10000 m – 30:15.2 (1945)

Thore Tillman (9 August 1915 – 2004) was a Swedish long-distance runner. He won national titles in the 10000 m (1938, 1939, 1944 and 1946) and 8 km cross country (1941) and held national records over 5000 m (1939) and 10,000 m. He placed fifth in the 10000 m at the 1938 European Championships and failed to finish in 1946.
