= Paul Rekers =

American long-distance runner

Personal information
- Full name: Paul Ernest Rekers
- Nationality: American
- Born: November 22, 1908
- Died: June 10, 1987 (aged 78)

Sport
- Sport: Long-distance running
- Event: 5000 metres

Paul Ernest Rekers (November 22, 1908 – June 10, 1987) was an American long-distance runner. He competed in the men's 5000 metres at the 1932 Summer Olympics.
