= 1930 International Cross Country Championships =

- Organisers: ICCU
- Edition: 23rd
- Date: 22 March
- Host city: Newbold Comyn Farm Estate, Royal Leamington Spa, Warwickshire, England
- Events: 1
- Distances: 9.5 mi (15.3 km)
- Participation: 61 athletes from 7 nations

The 1930 International Cross Country Championships was held at the Newbold Comyn Farm Estate, Royal Leamington Spa, England, on 22 March 1930. A report on the event was given in the Glasgow Herald. Prior to the race a luncheon was held for delegates at the Town Hall. Following the race, at the same venue, delegates and runners enjoyed a formal dinner, the award of trophies and a ball.

Complete results, medalists, and the results of British athletes were published.

== Medalists ==
Event	Gold		Silver		Bronze	
Individual
Men; 9.5 mi (15.3 km)	Tom Evenson; England	53:49	Robbie Sutherland; Scotland	53:50	Roméo Dieguez; France	54:15
Team
Men	England	30	France	80	Scotland	111

== Individual Race Results ==
=== Men's (9.5 mi / 15.3 km) ===
Rank	Athlete	Nationality	Time
1st place, gold medalist(s)	Tom Evenson	England	53:49
2nd place, silver medalist(s)	Robbie Sutherland	Scotland	53:50
3rd place, bronze medalist(s)	Roméo Dieguez	France	54:15
4	Ernie Harper	England	54:23
4	Wally Howard	England	54:23
6	George Bailey	England	54:24
7	Jack Holden	England	54:25
8	Harry Eckersley	England	54:26
9	Roger Rérolle	France	54:59
10	J.A. Broadley	England	55:20
11	Henri Gallet	France	55:42
12	Georges Boue	France	55:45
13	John Suttie Smith	Scotland	55:48
14	Oscar van Rumst	Belgium	55:49
15	Arturo Peña	Spain	56:01
16	Jack Potts	England	56:06
17	Danny Phillips	Wales	56:07
18	Pierre Louchard	France	56:08
19	Tommy Kay	England	56:18
20	William J Gunn	Scotland	56:23
21	Maxi Stobbs	Scotland	56:24
22	Frank Stevenson	Scotland	56:25
23	German Campo	Spain	56:28
24	Thomas Kinsella	Ireland	56:29
25	Jesús Oyarbide	Spain	56:30
26	T.H. Timbrell	Wales	56:34
27	Henri Lahitte	France	56:35
28	Dougie Coard	Ireland	56:43
29	Joseph Berthelot	France	56:43
30	P. Sheedy	Ireland	56:45
31	W.A. McCune	Ireland	56:46
32	Camille van de Velde	Belgium	56:47
33	Maxwell Rayne	Scotland	56:50
34	André Lausseigh	France	56:54
35	James Duggan	Wales	56:59
36	Joseph Orose	Belgium	57:09
37	T. O'Reilly	Ireland	57:16
38	Emile Goetleven	Belgium	57:21
39	Dunky Wright	Scotland	57:23
40	James Petrie	Scotland	57:26
41	J. Gifford	Wales	57:27
42	Jean Linsen	Belgium	57:28
43	Leon Verheylesonne	Belgium	57:35
44	John Timmins	Ireland	57:38
45	Harry McFall	Ireland	57:41
46	Louis de Lathouwer	Belgium	57:50
47	Maurice Christiaens	Belgium	58:13
48	Jack Prosser	Wales	58:20
49	José Reliegos	Spain	58:27
50	Tim Smythe	Ireland	58:38
51	Tom Burge	Wales	58:40
52	James Gardiner	Scotland	59:17
53	F.J. Shackell	Wales	59:24
54	Sid Daly	Ireland	59:54
55	René Geeraert	Belgium	1:00:18
56	I. Lloyd	Wales	1:00:32
57	Antonio Pachon Rivas	Spain	1:00:54
—	Claudio Egana	Spain	DNF
—	Juan Ramos	Spain	DNF
—	Maurice Waltispurger	France	DNF
—	Ernie Thomas	Wales	DNF

== Team Results ==
=== Men's ===
Rank	Country	Team	Points
1	England	Tom Evenson; Ernie Harper; Wally Howard; George Bailey; Jack Holden; Harry Eckersley	30
2	France	Roméo Dieguez; Roger Rérolle; Henri Gallet; Georges Boue; Pierre Louchard; Henri Lahitte	80
3	Scotland	Robbie Sutherland; John Suttie Smith; Walter Gunn; Maxi Stobbs; Frank Stevenson; Maxwell Rayne	111
4	Ireland	Thomas Kinsella; Dougie Coard; P. Sheedy; W.A. McCune; T. O'Reilly; John Timmins	194
5	Belgium	Oscar van Rumst; Camille van de Velde; Joseph Orose; Emile Goetleven; Jean Linsen; Leon Verheylesonne	205
6	Wales	Danny Phillips; T.H. Timbrell; James Duggan; J. Gifford; Jack Prosser; Tom Burge	218
—	Spain	Arturo Peña; German Campo; Jesús Oyarbide; José Reliegos; Antonio Pachon Rivas; Claudio Egana	DNF

== Participation ==
An unofficial count yields the participation of 61 athletes from 7 countries.

- Belgium (9)
- England (9)
- France (9)
- Ireland (9)
- Scotland (9)
- Spain (7)
- Wales (9)
