= Newbold Comyn =

Park in Leamington Spa, England

Coordinates: 52.289°N 1.515°W

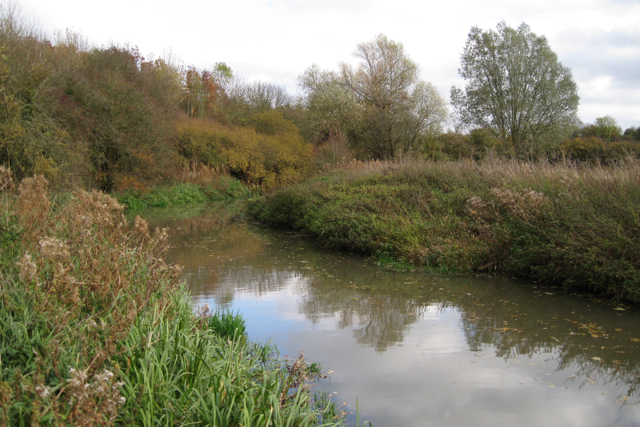
- Interactive map of Newbold Comyn
- Type: Country park
- Location: Leamington Spa, Warwickshire, England
- Area: 300 acres (120 ha)
- Operator: Warwick District Council
- Open: All year

Newbold Comyn is a park on the Eastern edge of Leamington Spa, Warwickshire, England.

== History ==
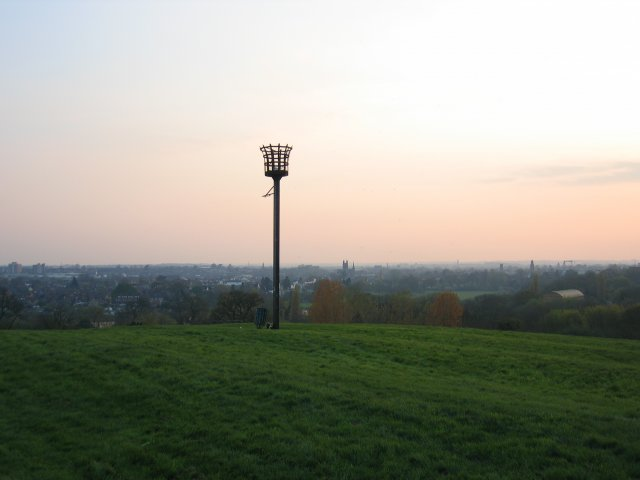
The Beacon and view

The first mention of Newbold Comyn in history was in the Domesday Book of 1086, which lists one of Leamington's two mills as being situated there. The name Comyn is derived from the Norman Comyn family who owned the land between 1160 and 1200. In 1539 Richard Willes and William Morcote jointly purchased the land that was now a farm. When Richard Willes died in 1564 his son inherited the whole estate as Richard had married Morcote's daughter. At the end of the 18th century, the Revd. Edward Willes built a new house on the estate in addition to the existing farm house. The Revd. Edward Willes died in 1820, and his son, also Edward, began to sell parts of the estate for building in 1823 as Leamington grew into a spa town. In all the Willes family held Newbold Comyn for over 400 years, until they sold most of the remaining estate to Leamington Corporation after the end of the Second World War.

The farm hosted the 1930 International Cross Country Championships, after which dinner and dancing took place at the Town Hall. The Willes family moved to Honington in South Warwickshire, and sold the mansion house to a subsidiary of AC Lloyd (Builders) in 1964. The main house, which stood where now the junction of Newbold Terrace East and Fernhill Drive is, was demolished in 1965, leaving only the farm and outbuildings. During the Second World War the Luftwaffe dumped two bombs on the park whilst returning to base from Coventry. The craters can still be seen. The Corporation laid out the leisure park in the 1970s and the land usage has remained the same ever since although it is now run by Warwick District Council. There used to be an old steam engine on which young people could climb and play, but this had to be removed due to health and safety regulations.

== Modern day park and facilities ==
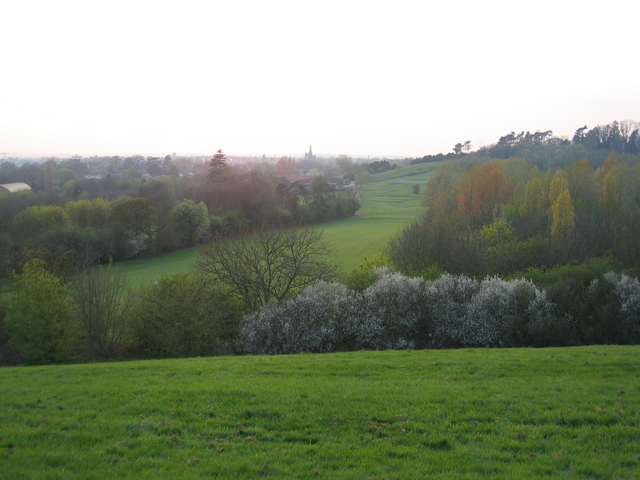
The golf course as viewed from Beacon Hill

Today the park is over 120 hectares (300 acres) in area. There is rugby, football and cricket. There are two children's play areas, a skate park and a BMX track. On the town side of the park is the town's Leisure Centre which has two swimming pools (a 25-metre pool and a children's pool), an aerobics studio and a gym. Fishing is allowed on the River Leam which passes through the park. The park is mainly flat but there is a hill "Observation Hill" with a beacon at the top, from which there are fine views of south Warwickshire. Near the park entrance is the Newbold Comym Arms, converted from the farmhouse to a pub. The pub serves food, as does the leisure centre cafe. The park no longer allows barbecues. There is car parking at the leisure centre. A Parkrun takes places every Saturday morning.

In late 2009 the park briefly made news in the local paper when there were rumoured sightings of a lynx on the golf course. The big cat was dubbed the "Beast of Newbold Comyn" by the media.

In 2023 part of the previous golf course (closed in 2018) was repurposed into off-road cycle trails of different grades, total length approx. 4km, and which were designed as a free local facility.

=== Landmarks ===
The Newbold Comyn Arms, formerly a farmhouse and now a public house, is a listed building located in the park.

== See also ==
- Royal Pump Room Gardens
