= Erik Peterson =

Erik Peterson may refer to:

- Erik A. Peterson, United States Air Force general
- Erik Peterson (politician) (Erik C. Peterson), member of the New Jersey General Assembly
- Erik C. Peterson (general), United States Army general
- Erik Peterson (theologian), German theologian and Christian archeologist

== See also ==
- Erik Petersen (disambiguation)
- Eric Peterson, Canadian actor
- Eric Peterson (musician), American guitarist
