= Giuseppe Beviacqua =

Italian long-distance runner

Personal information
- Nationality: Italian
- Born: 28 October 1914 Savona, Italy
- Died: 19 August 1999 (aged 84) Savona, Italy
- Height: 1.60 m (5 ft 3 in)
- Weight: 49 kg (108 lb)

Sport
- Country: Italy
- Sport: Athletics
- Event: Long distance running
- Club: Unione Sportiva Giordana

Achievements and titles
- Personal bests: 5000 m: 14:50.4 (1942); 10000 m: 30:27.4 (1940)
Medal record
Men's athletics
Representing Italy
European Championships
Silver medal – second place	1938 Paris	10,000 m

Giuseppe Beviacqua (28 October 1914 – 19 August 1999) was an Italian long distance runner who competed at the 1936 Summer Olympics.

== Biography ==
At the 1936 Olympic Games in Berlin, Beviacqua participated in the men's 10,000 metres and finished 11th.

Beviacqua won the British AAA Championships title in the 6 miles event at the 1938 AAA Championships.

Beviacqua collected 22 caps for the national team from 1936 to 1951.

== Achievements ==
Year	Competition	Venue	Position	Event	Performance	Note
1936	Olympic Games	(Germany) Berlin	11th	10000 metres	31:57.7	

== National titles ==
Giuseppe Beviacqua has won 15 times the individual national championship.

- 6 wins in 5000 metres (1938, 1939, 1940, 1941, 1942, 1943)
- 7 wins in 10000 metres (1936, 1937, 1942, 1943, 1946, 1947, 1948)
- 2 wins in Cross country running (1949, 1950)

== See also ==
- Italian Athletics Championships - Multi winners
- 5000 metres winners of Italian Athletics Championships
- 10000 metres winners of Italian Athletics Championships
