= Daniel Dean (athlete) =

American long-distance runner

Personal information
- Full name: Daniel Ely Dean
- Nationality: American
- Born: January 3, 1909 Williamsport, Pennsylvania, USA
- Died: September 13, 2004 (aged 95) Naples, Florida, USA

Sport
- Sport: Long-distance running
- Event: 5000 metres
- College team: Penn Quakers

Daniel Ely Dean (January 3, 1909 – September 13, 2004) was an American long-distance runner. He competed in the men's 5000 metres at the 1932 Summer Olympics.
