= Erik Pettersson (athlete) =

Swedish long-distance runner

Personal information
- Full name: Erik Valdemar Pettersson
- Nationality: Swedish
- Born: 6 September 1906
- Died: 22 July 1974 (aged 67)

Sport
- Sport: Long-distance running
- Event: 5000 metres

Erik Valdemar Pettersson (6 September 1906 – 22 July 1974), was a long-distance runner from Sweden. He competed in the men's 5000 metres at the 1932 Summer Olympics.
