= Jan Linsen (athlete) =

Belgian long-distance runner

Jan Frans Linsen
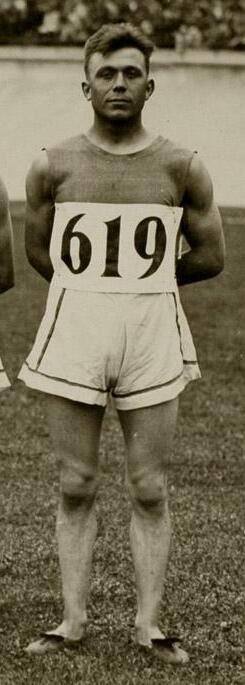
- Linsen at the 1928 Summer Olympics

Personal information
- Nationality: Belgian
- Born: 2 November 1903 Mechelen
- Died: 17 January 1961 (aged 57) Mechelen

Sport
- Sport: Long-distance running
- Event: Marathon

Jan Frans Linsen (2 November 1903 – 17 January 1961) was a Belgian long-distance runner. He competed in the marathon at the 1928 Summer Olympics.
