= Roger Vigneron =

French middle-distance runner

Personal information
- Nationality: French
- Born: 19 June 1910
- Died: 14 December 1973 (aged 63)

Sport
- Sport: Middle-distance running
- Event: Steeplechase

Roger Vigneron (19 June 1910 – 14 December 1973) was a French middle-distance runner. He competed in the men's 3000 metres steeplechase at the 1932 Summer Olympics.
