= André Sicard =

French long-distance runner

Personal information
- Born: 19 February 1915 Niort, France
- Died: 30 November 1973 (aged 58) La Rochelle, France

Sport
- Sport: Athletics
- Event: 10,000 m
- Club: Racing Club de La Rochelle

Achievements and titles
- Personal best: 10,000 m – 31:59.2 (1937)
Medal record
Representing France
International Cross Country Championships
| Silver medal – second place | 1937 Brussels | Individual |
| Silver medal – second place | 1937 Brussels | Team |

André Sicard (19 February 1915 – 30 November 1973) was a French long-distance runner who specialised in the 10 km. In this event he finished 19th at the 1936 Summer Olympics and 8th at the 1938 European Championships. Sicard won individual and team silver medals at the 1937 International Cross Country Championships.
