= Erik Pettersson (bandy, born 1990) =

Swedish bandy player

Erik Pettersson (born 27 February 1990) is a former Swedish bandy goalkeeper. Pettersson is a youth product of Vetlanda BK and made his debut Vetlanda BK during the 2006–07 season. He later joined Skirö-Nävelsjö BS.

Erik has played for the Swedish U17 squad in the 2006–07 season.
