= Lauri Virtanen =

Finnish long-distance runner

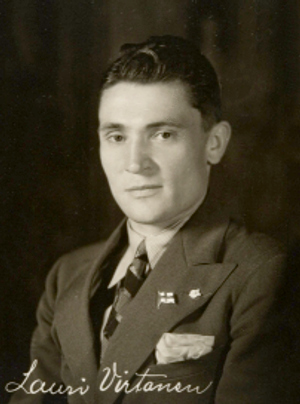
- Lauri Virtanen in 1932

Personal information
- Born: 3 August 1904 Uskela, Salo, Finland
- Died: 8 February 1982 (aged 77) Turku, Finland
- Height: 1.72 m (5 ft 8 in)
- Weight: 68 kg (150 lb)

Sport
- Sport: Athletics
- Events: 5000 m, 10000 m, marathon
- Club: Turun Riento, Turku

Achievements and titles
- Personal bests: 5000 m – 14:36.8 (1932); 10000 m – 30:30.7 (1933); Marathon – 2:48:53 (1935)
Medal record
Representing Finland
Summer Olympics
Bronze medal – third place	1932 Los Angeles	5000 m
Bronze medal – third place	1932 Los Angeles	10000 m

Lauri Johannes Virtanen also known as Lasse Virtanen (3 August 1904 – 8 February 1982) was a Finnish long-distance runner who competed at the 1932 Summer Olympics.

== Career ==
Virtanen won the British AAA Championships title in the 4 miles event at the British 1930 AAA Championships.

Virtanen won bronze medals in the 5000 metres and 10,000 metres during the 1932 Olympics in Los Angeles.

He finished fourth in the 5000 metres at the 1934 European Championships. His brother Eino was an Olympic wrestler.
