= Erik Pedersen (ice hockey) =

Norwegian ice hockey player

Personal information
- Born: 1955 (age 70–71) Fredrikstad, Norway

Sport
- Sport: Ice hockey
- Club: Stjernen

Erik Pedersen (born 1955) is a former Norwegian ice hockey player. He was born in Fredrikstad and played for the club Stjernen Hockey. He played for the Norwegian national ice hockey team at the 1980 Winter Olympics.
