= Renée Trente-Ganault =

French athletics competitor

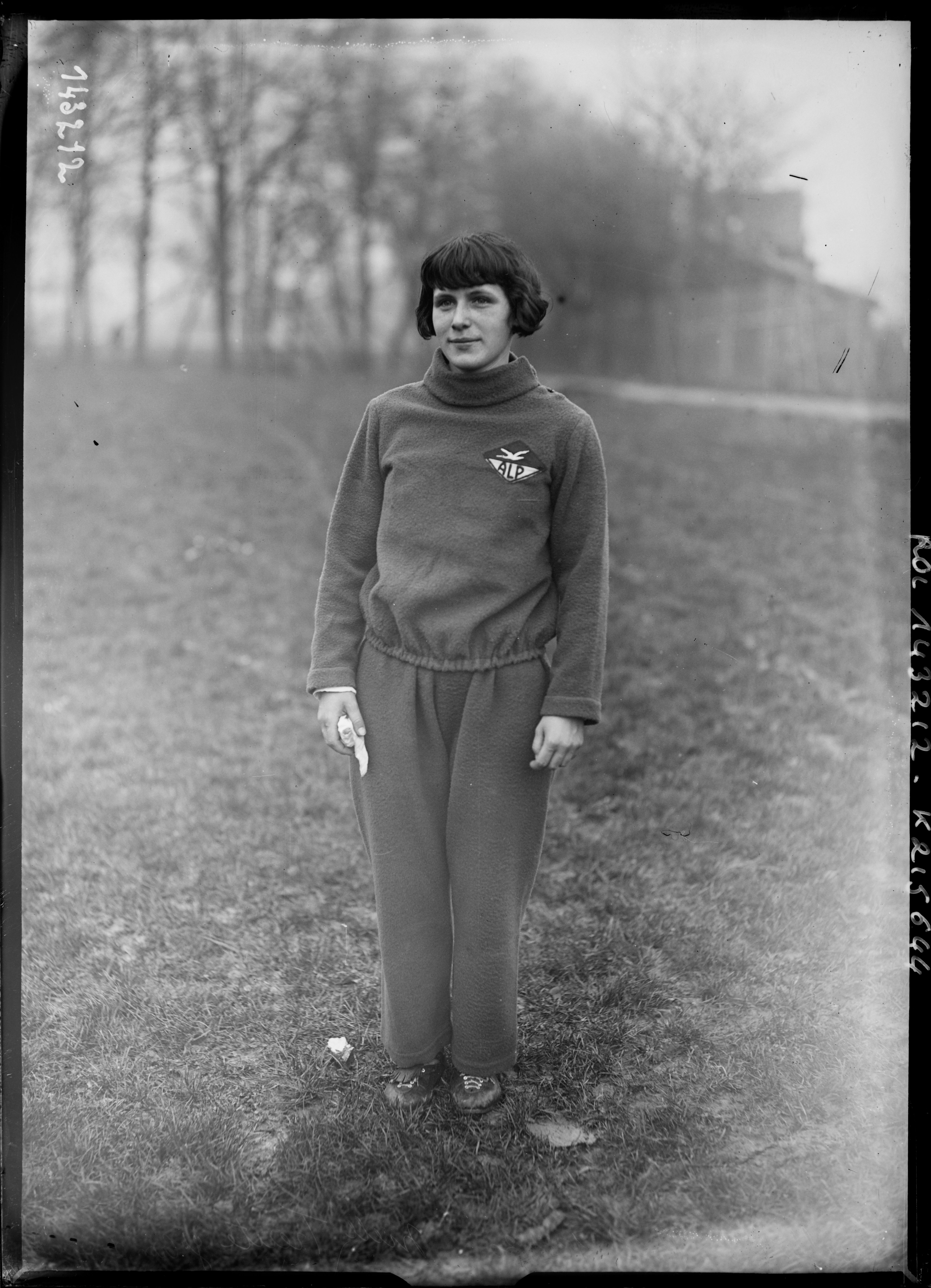
- Trente-Ganault after her win in Pavillons-sous-Bois, January 1930

Personal information
- Born: 9 October 1907 Paris, France
- Died: 26 July 2004 (aged 96) Cavaillon, France

Renée Trent-Ganault (9 October 1907 – 26 July 2004) was a French cross country and middle-distance athlete. She was a pioneer in women's distance running.

== Career ==
Trent-Ganault ran for AS Philotechnique in 1925, and Alsace Lorraine from Paris in 1926. She was French Cross Country Champion in 1929, 1941 and 1942. She was selected for five international French teams before the war in cross country. Renee was ninth in the 1938 International Cross Country Championships.

Trent-Ganault was elected Cross Country woman of the century by the French Athletics Federation, because of her many victories between 1925 and 1946.
