= Oscar Van Rumst =

Belgian long-distance runner (1910–1960)

Personal information
- Full name: Oscar Theophiel Clothilda Van Rumst
- Nationality: Belgian
- Born: 7 February 1910 Lokeren, Belgium
- Died: 10 July 1960 (aged 50) Lokeren, Belgium

Sport
- Sport: Long-distance running
- Event: 5000 metres

Oscar Theophiel Clothilda Van Rumst (7 February 1910 – 10 July 1960) was a Belgian long-distance runner. He competed in the men's 5000 metres at the 1936 Summer Olympics.
