= André Lonlas =

French long-distance runner

Personal information
- Nationality: French
- Born: 5 June 1910
- Died: 21 October 2003 (aged 93)

Sport
- Sport: Long-distance running
- Event: 10,000 metres

André Lonlas (5 June 1910 – 21 October 2003) was a French long-distance runner. He competed in the men's 10,000 metres at the 1936 Summer Olympics.
