= Jean-Gunnar Lindgren =

Swedish long-distance runner (1905–1983)

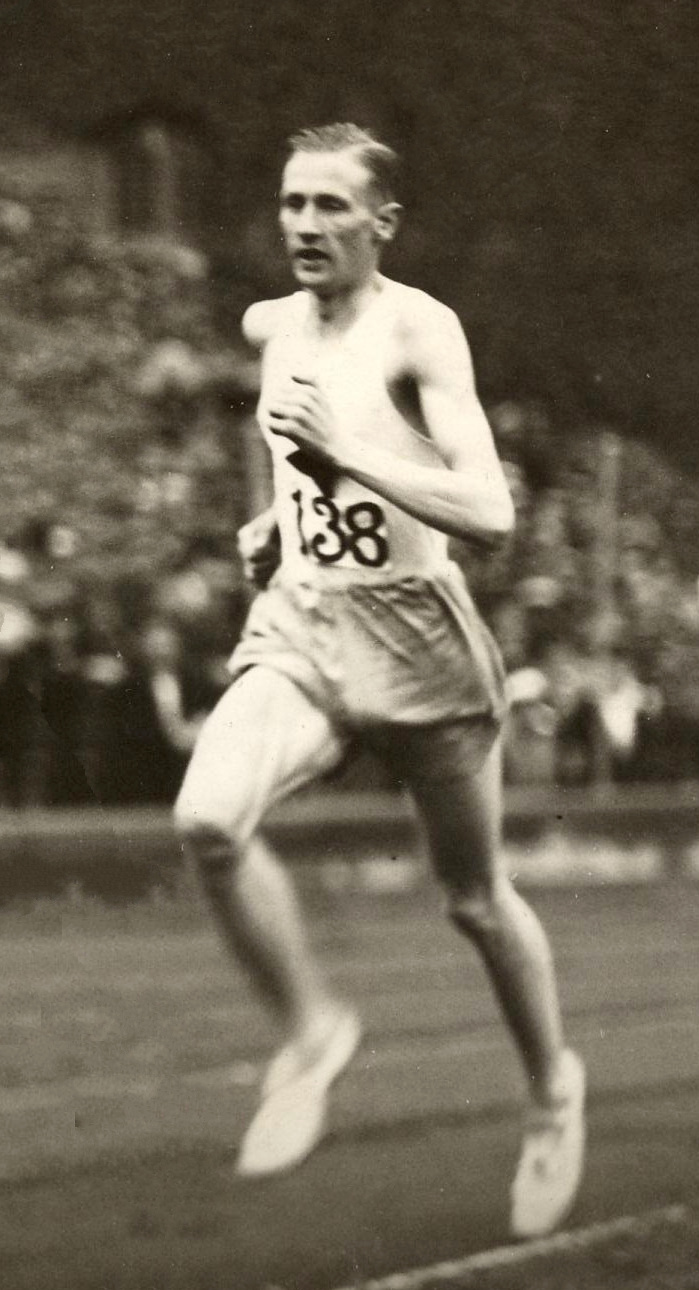

Personal information
- Born: 18 September 1905 Falu Kristine, Falun, Sweden
- Died: 23 February 1983 (aged 77) Helsingborg, Sweden
- Height: 1.84 m (6 ft 0 in)
- Weight: 64 kg (141 lb)

Sport
- Sport: Athletics
- Event(s): Steeplechase, 5000 m, 10,000 m
- Club: IFK Falun; IFK Borås

Achievements and titles
- Personal best(s): 5000 m – 14:43.6 (1934); 10000 m – 31:18.4 (1934); 3000 mS – 9:49.0e (1928)

Jean-Gunnar Lindgren (18 September 1905 – 23 February 1983) was a Swedish long-distance runner who competed at the 1928 and 1932 Summer Olympics. In 1928, he abandoned his 3,000 m steeplechase race and finished fourth in the 10,000 m. In 1932 he ended fifth and sixth in the 5,000 and 10,000 m events. Lindgren held Swedish titles in the 5,000 m (1929, 1931 and 1934), 10,000 m (1928–1931 and 1933–1936) and 8 km cross country (1929–1932).
