= Shoichiro Takenaka =

Japanese long-distance runner

Personal information
- Nationality: Japanese
- Born: 30 September 1912
- Died: 4 April 1997 (aged 84)

Sport
- Sport: Long-distance running
- Event: 5000 metres

Shoichiro Takenaka (竹中 正一郎, Takenaka Shōichirō; 30 September 1912 – 4 April 1997) was a Japanese long-distance runner. He competed in the men's 5000 metres at the 1932 Summer Olympics.
