= Stan Tomlin =

British athlete

Personal information
- Nationality: British (English)
- Born: 16 September 1905 St Albans, Hertfordshire, England
- Died: 17 January 1969 (aged 63) Elstree, Hertfordshire, England

Sport
- Sport: Athletics
- Event: middle-distance
- Club: Highgate Harriers
Medal record
Men's Athletics
Representing England
British Empire Games
Gold medal – first place	1930 Hamilton	3 miles

Stanley Arthur Tomlin (16 September 1905 – 17 January 1969) was an English middle-distance runner who competed in the 1930 British Empire Games.

== Career ==
Tomlin finished third behind Cyril Ellis in the 1 mile event at the 1929 AAA Championships.

At 1930 British Empire Games he won the gold medal in the 3 miles event. He also participated in the 6 miles competition.

== Published works ==
1956 - Olympic Odyssey.Published by Modern Athlete Publications Ltd., Croydon.
