= Max Syring =

German long-distance runner (1908–1983)

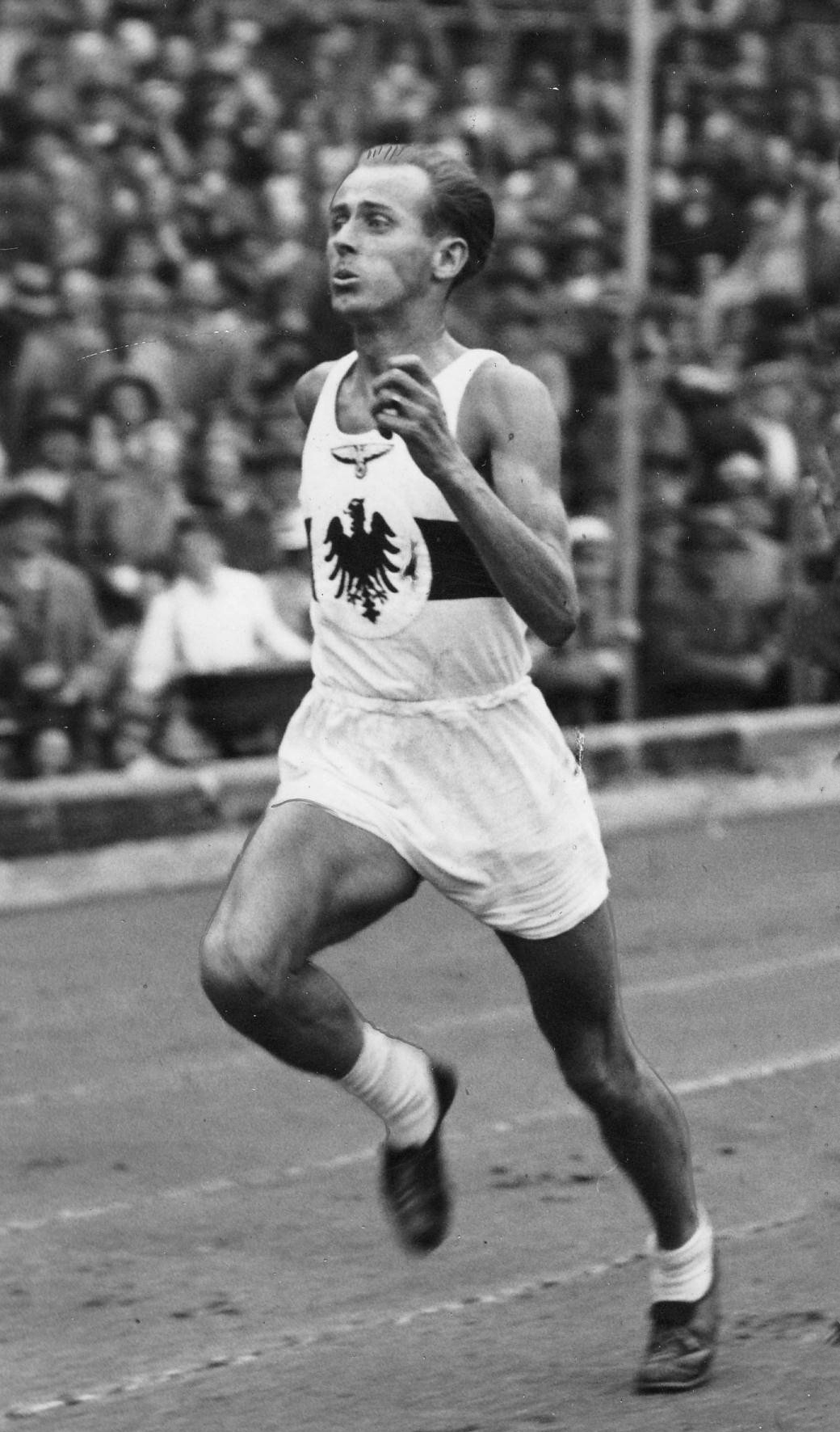
- Max Syring in 1934

Personal information
- Born: 20 August 1908 Reuden, German Empire
- Died: 14 April 1983 (aged 74) Hamburg, West Germany
- Height: 1.70 m (5 ft 7 in)
- Weight: 60 kg (130 lb)

Sport
- Sport: Athletics
- Event(s): 5,000 m; 10,000 m
- Club: KTV Wittenberg

Achievements and titles
- Personal best(s): 5000 m – 14:39.0 (1939); 10000 m – 30:06.6 (1940)
Medal record
Men's athletics
Representing Germany
European Championships
Bronze medal – third place	1938 Paris	10,000 m

Max Syring (20 August 1908 – 14 April 1983) was a German long-distance runner who won a bronze medal over 10,000 m at the 1938 European Championships. He competed at the 1932 Summer Olympics in the 5,000 and 10,000 m events and finished in sixth and fifth place, respectively; he failed to reach the 5,000 m final at the 1936 Summer Olympics. In retirement, Syring worked as an athletics coach. His trainees included Klaus Richtzenhain.
