= Fernand Le Heurteur =

French long-distance runner

Personal information
- Nationality: French
- Born: 27 September 1905
- Died: 12 December 1989 (aged 84)

Sport
- Sport: Long-distance running
- Event: Marathon

Fernand Le Heurteur (27 September 1905 – 12 December 1989) was a French long-distance runner. He competed in the marathon at the 1936 Summer Olympics.
