= Masamichi Kitamoto =

Japanese long-distance runner

Personal information
- Nationality: Japanese
- Born: 16 June 1909
- Died: 1995 (aged 85–86)

Sport
- Sport: Long-distance running
- Event: 5000 metres

Masamichi Kitamoto (北本 正路, Kitamoto Masamichi; 16 June 1909 – 1995) was a Japanese long-distance runner. He competed in the men's 5000 metres at the 1932 Summer Olympics.
