= Jack Holden (runner) =

English runner (1907–2004)

- Holden on the January 1951 cover of World Sports Magazine

Personal information
- Born: 13 March 1907 Bilston, Staffordshire, England
- Died: 7 March 2004 (aged 96) Cockermouth, Cumbria, England

Sport
- Sport: Athletics
- Event: 3 miles – marathon
- Club: Tipton Harriers

Achievements and titles
- Personal best: Marathon – 2:31:03.4 (1950)
Medal record
Men's athletics
Representing Great Britain
European Championships
Gold medal – first place	1950 Brussels	Marathon
Representing England
Commonwealth Games
Gold medal – first place	1950 Auckland	Marathon
International Cross Country Championships
Silver medal – second place	1929 Vincennes	Team (18 ind)
Gold medal – first place	1930 Leamington	Team (7 ind)
Gold medal – first place	1931 Dublin	Team (6 ind)
Silver medal – second place	1932 Brussels	Individual
Gold medal – first place	1932 Brussels	Team
Gold medal – first place	1933 Caerlon	Individual
Gold medal – first place	1933 Caerlon	Team
Gold medal – first place	1934 Ayr	Individual
Gold medal – first place	1934 Ayr	Team
Gold medal – first place	1935 Paris	Individual
Gold medal – first place	1935 Paris	Team
Silver medal – second place	1936 Blackpool	Individual
Gold medal – first place	1936 Blackpool	Team
Gold medal – first place	1938 Belfast	Team (6 ind)
Gold medal – first place	1939 Cardiff	Individual
Silver medal – second place	1939 Cardiff	Team
Bronze medal – third place	1946 Ayr	Team (6 ind)

John Thomas Holden (13 March 1907 – 7 March 2004) was a long-distance runner from England, who won four consecutive national titles in the marathon (1947–1950).

== Athletics career ==
Holden finished second behind John Potts in the 3 miles event and second behind James Wood in the 10 miles event at the 1932 AAA Championships.

Holden then became the national 6 miles champion after winning the British AAA Championships title at the 1933 AAA Championships. After retaining his 6 miles title and becoming national 10 miles champion at the 1934 AAA Championships, Holden competed for England in the 3 and 6 miles at the 1934 British Empire Games in London.

Holden continued to gain success in British long-distance running, winning the 6 miles AAA title at the 1935 AAA Championships. He competed for England at the 1938 British Empire Games in the 6 miles and marathon.

He represented Great Britain at the 1948 Summer Olympics in London, but abandoned the race due to foot blisters. He won the 1950 Empire Games marathon in Auckland, running the last nine miles barefoot after his shoes fell apart during the race.

He was also a successful cross country runner, becoming the first man to win the International Cross Country Championships four times, which he did between 1933 and 1939.

== Personal life ==
During World War II Holden served with the Royal Air Force. In the 1950s, Coseley Urban District Council named a new road on the Woodcross housing estate Jack Holden Avenue. On 23 July 1952, Jack Holden's Gardens were opened on Queens Road, Tipton.

Holden died in March 2004, at age 96. He was survived by daughter Joan and son-in-law Brian.
