= Billy Savidan =

New Zealand long-distance runner

Personal information
- Full name: John William Savidan
- Born: 23 May 1902 Auckland, New Zealand
- Died: 8 November 1991 (aged 89)
- Height: 1.69 m (5 ft 6 1/2 in)

Sport
- Country: New Zealand
- Sport: Athletics

Achievements and titles
- National finals: 1 mile champion (1927, 1928, 1929); 3 miles champion (1927, 1928, 1929, 1932, 1933, 1934, 1937); Cross-country champion (1927, 1928, 1929, 1931, 1933, 1935)
Medal record
Men's Athletics
Representing New Zealand
Commonwealth Games
Gold medal – first place	1930 Hamilton	6 miles

John William Savidan (23 May 1902 – 8 November 1991), nicknamed "Billy", "Bill" or "Jack" and born in Auckland, was a New Zealand long distance runner from 1926.

At the 1930 British Empire Games in Hamilton, Ontario he won the six mile race with a time of 30:49.6 mins, despite stopping over the finish line after what he thought was the last lap and being told that there was a lap to go. The official had inadvertently turned over two discs instead of one. He beat Ernie Harper from England. In the three mile race (equivalent to 5000 metres) he did not finish.

At the 1932 Summer Olympics at Los Angeles he finished fourth in both the 5000 metre event and the 10000 metre competition.

He did not compete in the national championships in 1935 and 1936 as he was working as a stonemason and could not spend the necessary time training, but competed against two Japanese runners who were visiting New Zealand in 1937. Like Malcolm Champion before him he was then for some years Custodian at Auckland's Tepid Baths.
