= Alex Hillhouse =

Australian long-distance runner

Medal record

Men's athletics

Representing Australia

British Empire Games
Silver medal – second place	1930 Hamilton	3 miles
Silver medal – second place	1930 Hamilton	2 mi steeplechase

Alexander John Hillhouse (31 March 1907 – 3 March 1983) was an Australian athlete who competed in the 1932 Summer Olympics. He was born in Melbourne, and attended Mentone Grammar School. In 1932 he finished tenth the 5000 metres event. At the 1930 Empire Games he won the silver medal in the 3 miles competition as well as in the 2 miles steeplechase contest.
