= Tom Evenson =

English long-distance runner

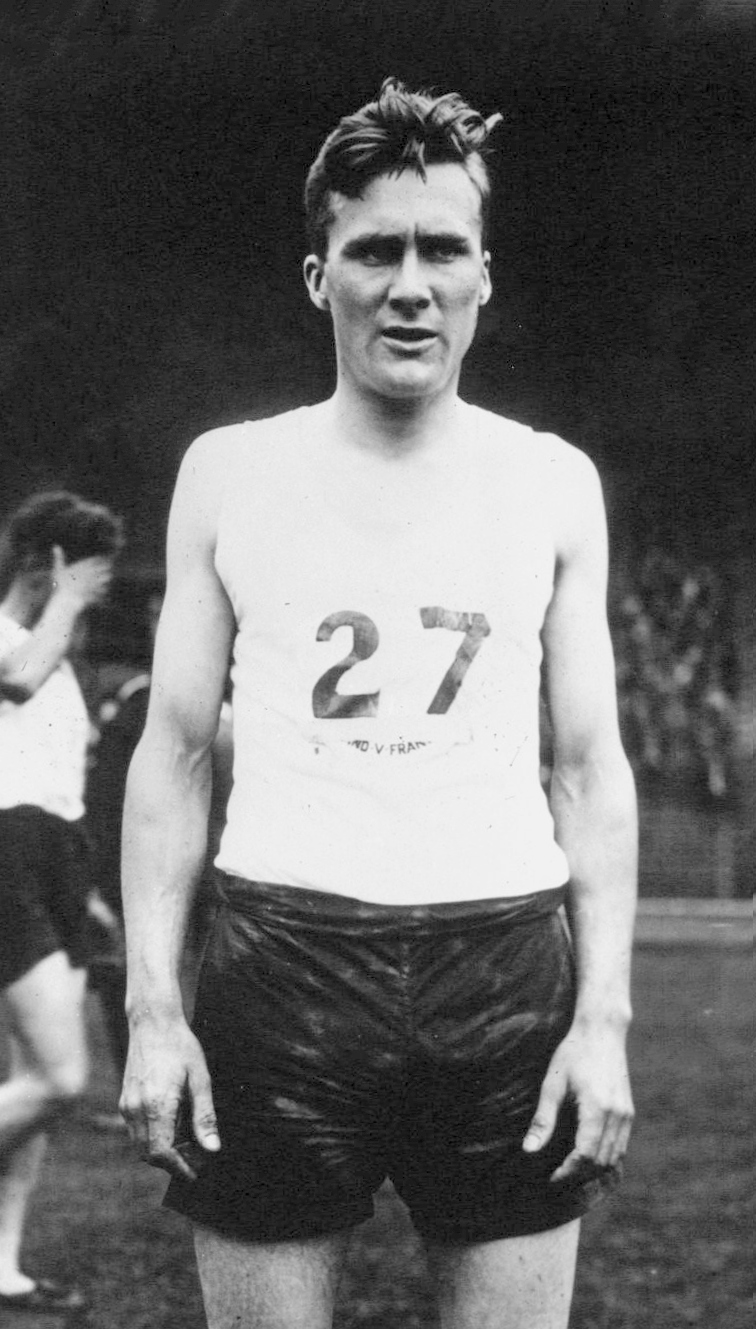
- Tom Evenson in 1933

Personal information
- Born: 9 January 1910 Manchester, England
- Died: 28 November 1997 (aged 87)
- Height: 1.70 m (5 ft 7 in)
- Weight: 60 kg (132 lb)

Sport
- Sport: Athletics
- Events: 1500–5000 m, steeplechase
- Club: Salford Harriers

Achievements and titles
- Personal bests: Mile – 4:22.2e (1932); 3000 m – 8:46.3 (1933); 5000 m – 14:54.8 (1931); 3000 mS – 9:18.8 (1932)
Medal record
Representing Great Britain
Olympics
Silver medal – second place	1932 Los Angeles	3000 m steeplechase
Representing England
British Empire Games
Silver medal – second place	1934 London	2 mi steeplechase
Bronze medal – third place	1930 Hamilton	6 miles
International Cross Country Championships
Gold medal – first place	1930 Leamington	Team
Gold medal – first place	1930 Leamington	Individual
Gold medal – first place	1931 Dublin	Team
Bronze medal – third place	1931 Dublin	Individual
Gold medal – first place	1932 Brussels	Team
Gold medal – first place	1932 Brussels	Individual
Gold medal – first place	1933 Caerleon	Team
Gold medal – first place	1934 Ayr	Team

Thomas Evenson (9 January 1910 – 28 November 1997) was an English long-distance runner who competed for Great Britain at the 1932 and 1936 Summer Olympics.

== Career ==
Shortly before the 1930 British Empire Games in Canada, Evenson finished third behind Jack Winfield in the 10 miles event at the 1930 AAA Championships. At the 1930 Empire Games he won a bronze medal in the 6 miles event.

In 1931 Evenson became the national steeplechase champion after winning the British AAA Championships title at the 1931 AAA Championships and successfully retained the title at the 1932 AAA Championships.

At the 1932 Olympic Games, he won the silver medal in the 3000 metre steeplechase event.

In 1934 he won the silver medal in the 2-mile steeplechase at the 1934 British Empire Games. Two years later Evenson regained the steeplechase AAA Championships title at the 1936 AAA Championships. One month later he was selected to represent Great Britain at the 1936 Olympic Games held in Berlin, where he was eliminated in the first round of the 3000 metre steeplechase competition.

Evenson competed at the International Cross Country Championships in 1930–1936 and won seven gold medals: two individual and five with English teams.
