= George Bailey (athlete) =

British steeplechase and long-distance runner

Personal information
- Nationality: British (English)
- Born: 29 April 1906 Buxton, Derbyshire, England
- Died: 24 July 2000 (aged 94) Bury St. Edmunds, England

Sport
- Sport: Athletics
- Event: Steeplechase
- Club: Salford Harriers
Medal record
Men's Athletics
Representing England
British Empire Games
| Gold medal – first place | 1930 Hamilton | 2 mi steeplechase |
| Bronze medal – third place | 1934 London | 2 mi steeplechase |

George William Bailey (29 April 1906 – 24 July 2000) was an English athlete who competed for Great Britain in the 1932 Summer Olympics.

== Biography ==
Bailey was born in Buxton and became the national steeplechase champion after winning the British AAA Championships title at the 1930 AAA Championships. At the 1930 British Empire Games he won the gold medal in the 2 miles steeplechase competition

Bailey finished second behind Thomas Evenson in the steeplechase event at the 1931 AAA Championships and 1932 AAA Championships.

Shortly afterwards he was selected to represent Great Britain at the 1932 Olympic Games in Los Angeles, where he finished fifth in the 3000 metre steeplechase event and in the 5000 metres competition he was eliminated in the first round.

Bailey became the national 10 miles champion after winning the British AAA Championships title at the 1933 AAA Championships.

At the 1934 British Empire Games he won the bronze medal in the 2 miles steeplechase contest and the following year regained his AAA steeplechase title at the 1935 AAA Championships.

In the 1950s he was an early mentor to John Tarrant, the Ghost Runner.
