= Athletics at the 1924 Summer Olympics – Men's team cross country =

Men's team cross country at the Games of the VIII Olympiad
- Venue: Stade Olympique Yves-du-Manoir
- Date: July 12, 1924
- Competitors: 38 from 10 nations

Medalists
| 1st place, gold medalist(s) | | Liimatainen, Nurmi, Ville Ritola; Berg, Rastas, Sipilä; Finland |
| 2nd place, silver medalist(s) | | Fager, Johnson, Studenroth; Booth, Gray, Henigan; United States |
| 3rd place, bronze medalist(s) | | Heuet, Lauvaux, Norland; Dolquès, Lausseigh, Marchal; France |

The men's team cross country event was part of the track and field athletics programme at the 1924 Summer Olympics. It was the third and last appearance of this event. The competition was held on Saturday, July 12, 1924.

Six nations competed as they have at least three competitors participating in the individual cross country race.

== Results ==
The first three runners for each nation to finish in the individual cross country race counted towards the team results. The placings and points were only given to the first three runners of the teams that had already three finishers. Their placings were summed, and the team with the lowest sum won.

| Place | Team | Score | Total |
Final
| 1 | Finland | | 11 |
| 1 | Paavo Nurmi | 1 | 11 |
| 1 | Ville Ritola | 2 | 11 |
| 1 | Heikki Liimatainen | 8 | 11 |
| | Väinö Sipilä | DNF | |
| | Eino Rastas | DNF | |
| | Eero Berg | DNF | |
| 2 | United States | | 14 |
| 2 | Earl Johnson | 3 | 14 |
| 2 | Arthur Studenroth | 5 | 14 |
| 2 | August Fager | 6 | 14 |
| | James Henigan | (11) | |
| | John Gray | DNF | |
| | Verne Booth | DNF | |
| 3 | France | | 20 |
| 3 | Henri Lauvaux | 4 | 20 |
| 3 | Gaston Heuet | 7 | 20 |
| 3 | Maurice Norland | 9 | 20 |
| | Robert Marchal | DNF | |
| | André Lausseigh | DNF | |
| | Lucien Dolquès | DNF | |
| — | Spain | | DNF |
| — | Fabián Velasco | (13) | DNF |
| — | Miguel Peña | (14) | DNF |
| — | José Andía | DNF | DNF |
| | Jesús Diéguez | DNF | |
| | Amador Palma | DNF | |
| | Miguel Palau | DNF | |
| — | Great Britain | | DNF |
| — | Ernie Harper | (4) | DNF |
| — | Arthur Sewell | DNF | DNF |
| — | John Benham | DNF | DNF |
| | Eddie Webster | DNF | |
| | Joseph Williams | DNF | |
| — | Sweden | | DNF |
| — | Edvin Wide | DNF | DNF |
| — | Sven Thuresson | DNF | DNF |
| — | Sidon Ebeling | DNF | DNF |
| | Gösta Bergström | DNF | |
