= Athletics at the 1924 Summer Olympics – Men's individual cross country =

Men's individual cross country at the Games of the VIII Olympiad
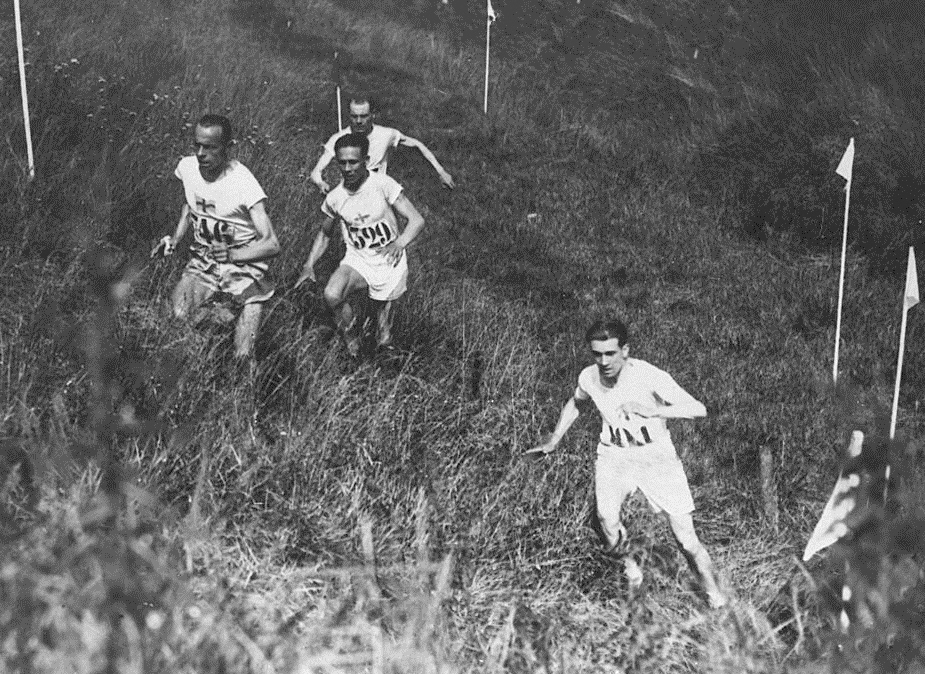
- 1924 individual cross country race. The left trio is Edvin Wide, Ville Ritola and Paavo Nurmi
- Venue: Stade Olympique Yves-du-Manoir
- Date: July 12, 1924
- Competitors: 38 from 10 nations

Medalists
1st place, gold medalist(s)		Paavo Nurmi; Finland
2nd place, silver medalist(s)		Ville Ritola; Finland
3rd place, bronze medalist(s)		Earl Johnson; United States

The men's individual cross country event was part of the track and field athletics programme at the 1924 Summer Olympics. It was the third and last appearance of this event. The competition was held on Saturday, July 12, 1924. Thirty-eight runners from ten nations competed.

== Results ==
The first three runners for each nation to finish this event also counted towards the cross country team result.

The course was 10,650 metres (6.62 mi) in length.

The course was unusually difficult, including stone paths that were covered in knee-high thistles and weeds. This, combined with extreme weather conditions of over 40 °C and noxious fumes emitted from a power plant near the course, resulted in only 15 of the 38 starters crossing the finish line. After the event, both the Red Cross and local police spent hours searching for runners who had passed out on the course.

Place	Athlete	Time
1	Paavo Nurmi (FIN)	32:54.8
2	Ville Ritola (FIN)	34:19.4
3	Earl Johnson (USA)	35:21.0
4	Ernie Harper (GBR)	35:45.4
5	Henri Lauvaux (FRA)	36:44.8
6	Arthur Studenroth (USA)	36:45.4
7	Carlo Martinenghi (ITA)	37:01.0
8	August Fager (USA)	37:40.6
9	Len Richardson (RSA)	37:46.0
10	Gaston Heuet (FRA)	37:52.0
11	James Henigan (USA)	38:00.0
12	Heikki Liimatainen (FIN)	38:18.0
13	Fabián Velasco (ESP)	39:07.6
14	Miguel Peña (ESP)	41:34.0
15	Maurice Norland (FRA)	41:48.3
—	José Andía (ESP)	DNF
—	Arthur Sewell (GBR)	DNF
—	John Gray (USA)	DNF
—	Robert Marchal (FRA)	DNF
—	Edvin Wide (SWE)	DNF
—	Väinö Sipilä (FIN)	DNF
—	Sven Thuresson (SWE)	DNF
—	John Benham (GBR)	DNF
—	Verne Booth (USA)	DNF
—	John Ryan (IRL)	DNF
—	Sidon Ebeling (SWE)	DNF
—	Gösta Bergström (SWE)	DNF
—	Eino Rastas (FIN)	DNF
—	André Lauseig (FRA)	DNF
—	Jesús Diéguez (ESP)	DNF
—	Carlo Speroni (ITA)	DNF
—	Amador Palma (ESP)	DNF
—	Eero Berg (FIN)	DNF
—	Eddie Webster (GBR)	DNF
—	Lucien Dolquès (FRA)	DNF
—	Joseph Williams (GBR)	DNF
—	Alfredo Gomes (BRA)	DNF
—	Miguel Palau (ESP)	DNF
