= Mexico at the 1924 Summer Olympics =

- IOC code: MEX
- NOC: Mexican Olympic Committee

in Paris, France 5 – 27 July 1924
- Competitors: 15 in 3 sports
- Flag bearer: Alfredo Cuéllar
- Medals: Gold 0 Silver 0 Bronze 0 Total 0

Summer Olympics appearances (overview)
- 1900; 1904–1920; 1924; 1928; 1932; 1936; 1948; 1952; 1956; 1960; 1964; 1968; 1972; 1976; 1980; 1984; 1988; 1992; 1996; 2000; 2004; 2008; 2012; 2016; 2020; 2024; 2028

Mexico competed at the 1924 Summer Olympics in Paris, France. This was the nation's second appearance at the Olympics, after missing five consecutive appearances at the Olympics and its debut in 1900. Fifteen competitors, all men, took part in 15 events in three sports.

== Athletics ==
Eleven athletes represented Mexico in 1924. It was the nation's debut appearance in the sport.

Ranks given are within the heat.

Track & road events

Athlete	Event	Heats		Quarterfinals		Semifinals		Final	
Athlete	Event	Result	Rank	Result	Rank	Result	Rank	Result	Rank
Mariano Aguilar	100 m	Unknown	4	did not advance					
Herminio Ahumada	100 m	Unknown	6	did not advance					
Mariano Aguilar	200 m	Unknown	5	did not advance					
Herminio Ahumada	200 m	Unknown	4	did not advance					
Carlos Garces	200 m	Unknown	3	did not advance					
José Martínez	200 m	Unknown	4	did not advance					
Guillermo Amparan	400 m	52.0	4	did not advance					
Juan Escutia	400 m	Unknown	5	did not advance					
Carlos Garces	400 m	51.0	3	did not advance					
José Martínez	400 m	Unknown	4	did not advance					
Guillermo Amparan	800 m	Unknown	5	—N/a		did not advance			
José Francisco Cuevas	800 m	did not start		—N/a		did not advance			
Juan Escutia	800 m	Unknown	7	—N/a		did not advance			
Guillermo Amparan	1500 m	did not start		—N/a				did not advance	
Pedro Curiel	1500 m	did not start		—N/a				did not advance	
Juan Escutia	1500 m	did not start		—N/a				did not advance	
Daniel Eslava	1500 m	Unknown	7	—N/a				did not advance	
Pedro Curiel	5000 m	Unknown	12	—N/a				did not advance	
Daniel Eslava	5000 m	Unknown	13	—N/a				did not advance	
José Francisco Cuevas	10,000 m	—N/a						did not start	
Pedro Curiel	10,000 m	—N/a						did not finish	
Francisco Contreras	110 m hurdles	Unknown	5	—N/a		did not advance			
José Francisco Cuevas	3000 m steeplechase	did not start		—N/a				did not advance	
Pedro Curiel	3000 m steeplechase	did not start		—N/a				did not advance	
Juan Escutia	3000 m steeplechase	did not start		—N/a				did not advance	
Daniel Eslava	3000 m steeplechase	did not start		—N/a				did not advance	
Francisco Contreras	10 km walk	did not finish		—N/a				did not advance	
José Francisco Cuevas	Cross country	—N/a						did not start	
Pedro Curiel	Cross country	—N/a						did not start	
Juan Escutia	Cross country	—N/a						did not start	
Daniel Eslava	Cross country	—N/a						did not start	
Herminio Ahumada; Mariano Aguilar; Francisco Contreras; Carlos Garces; José Martínez	4 × 100 m relay	did not start		—N/a		did not advance			
Herminio Ahumada; Guillermo Amparan; Juan Escutia; Carlos Garces; José Martínez	4 × 400 m relay	did not start		—N/a				did not advance	
José Francisco Cuevas; Pedro Curiel; Juan Escutia; Daniel Eslava	3000 m team race	did not start		—N/a				did not advance	
José Francisco Cuevas; Pedro Curiel; Juan Escutia; Daniel Eslava	Team cross country	—N/a						did not start	

Field events

Athlete	Event	Qualification		Final	
Athlete	Event	Distance	Position	Distance	Position
Alfonso Stoopen	Men's high jump	did not start		did not advance	
Francisco Contreras	Men's long jump	5.735	28	did not advance	
Alfonso Stoopen	Men's long jump	5.480	32	did not advance	
Jesús Aguirre	Men's shot put	9.470	27	did not advance	
Jesús Aguirre	Men's discus throw	did not start		did not advance	

== Shooting ==
Two sport shooters represented Mexico in 1924. It was the nation's debut in the sport.

Shooter	Event	Final	
Shooter	Event	Score	Rank
Tirso Hernández	25 m rapid fire pistol	15	30
Manuel Solis	25 m rapid fire pistol	17	9
Manuel Solis	50 m rifle, prone	353	64

== Tennis ==
Men

Athlete	Event	Round of 128	Round of 64	Round of 32	Round of 16	Quarterfinals	Semifinals	Final	
Athlete	Event	Opposition Score	Opposition Score	Opposition Score	Opposition Score	Opposition Score	Opposition Score	Opposition Score	Rank
Felipe del Canto	Singles	Lupu (ROU); L 4–6, 3–6, 4–6	did not advance						
Mariano Lozano	Singles	Bache (DEN); L 6–2, 6–8, 7–9, 4–6	did not advance						
Felipe del Canto; Mariano Lozano	Doubles	—N/a	Bye	Zerlentis / Papadopoulos (GRE); L 2–6, 3–6, 6–4, 2–6	did not advance				
