= Spanish Cross Country Championships =

- Date: February/March
- Location: Various, Spain
- Event type: Cross country
- Distance: 12 km and 4 km for men 8 km and 4 km for women
- Established: 1919

The Spanish Cross Country Championships (Spanish: Campeonato de España de Campo a Través) is an annual cross country running organised by the Royal Spanish Athletics Federation (RFEA) that serves as the national championship for the sport in Spain. It is usually held in February or March.

It was first held in 1916 for men only and a women's race was added to the programme in 1965. A team element was present in the competition, decided by the finishing places of a team's top four runners. This was initially contested by federal territory, then by province from 1959–1985, and by autonomous community from 1986 onwards. An under-20 (junior) race was added for men in 1956 and a women's under-20 race in 1978. An under-23 (promesa) race for both men and women. A short race was held from 2002 to 2006 to align with national selection for that section at the IAAF World Cross Country Championships.

== Editions ==
Ed.	Year	Date	Location	Course	Ref
I	1916	6 February	Madrid	Colón-Puerta de Hierro-Dehesa de la Villa	
II	1917	11 February	Madrid	Paseo de Rosales y Parque del Oeste	
III	1918	10 March	Sant Cugat del Vallés	Can Mora	
IV	1919	23 February	San Sebastián	Campo de Atocha y alrededores	
V	1920	28 March	Bilbao	Alrededores del Campo de San Mamés	
VI	1921	27 March	Santander		
VII	1922	5 March	Alicante	Parque de Canalejas	
VIII	1923	29 de abril	San Sebastián	Campo de Atocha y alrededores	
IX	1924	24 February	Madrid	Estadio Metropolitano y alrededores	
X	1925	22 February	Sant Cugat del Vallés		
XI	1926	28 February	San Sebastián	Hipódromo de Lasarte	
XII	1927	27 February	Valencia	Campo de Mestalla y alrededores	
XIII	1928	25 March	Santander	Hipódromo de Bellavista	
XIV	1929	24 February	Gijón	El Molinón	
XV	1930	23 February	Vigo	Estadio de Balaídos y alrededores	
XVI	1931	8 February	Barcelona	Hipódromo Casa Antúnez	
XVII	1932	28 February	San Sebastián	Hipódromo de Lasarte	
XVIII	1933	12 March	Barcelona	Hipódromo Casa Antúnez	
XIX	1934	4 March	San Sebastián	Hipódromo de Lasarte	
XX	1935	3 March	San Sebastián	Hipódromo de Lasarte	
XXI	1936	8 March	Madrid	Casa de Campo	
	1937	Not held			
	1938	Not held			
	1939	Not held			
XXII	1940	24 March	Oviedo	Estadio y alrededores	
XXIII	1941	23 March	Zaragoza	Campo de Torrero	
XXIV	1942	22 March	Santander	Hipódromo	
XXV	1943	21 March	San Sebastián	Hipódromo de Lasarte	
XXVI	1944	26 March	Madrid	Alrededores del Estadio Metropolitano	
XXVII	1945	19 March	Galdácano	Campo de Santa Bárbara	
XXVIII	1946	19 March	San Sebastián	Hipódromo de Lasarte	
XXIX	1947	19 March	Madrid	Ciudad Universitaria	
XXX	1948	14 March	Sabadell	Campo de Aviación	
XXXI	1949	6 March	San Sebastián	Hipódromo de Lasarte	
XXXII	1950	5 March	Zaragoza	Campo de Torrero	
XXXIII	1951	11 March	Madrid	Casa de Campo	
XXXIV	1952	2 March	Sabadell	Campo de Aviación	
XXXV	1953	1 March	Madrid	Casa de Campo	
XXXVI	1954	7 March	San Sebastián	Hipódromo de Lasarte	
XXXVII	1955	6 March	San Sebastián	Hipódromo de Lasarte	
XXXVIII	1956	7 March	San Sebastián	Hipódromo de Lasarte	
XXXIX	1957	10 March	Santander	Hipódromo de Bellavista	
XL	1958	9 March	Vigo	Estadio de Balaídos y alrededores	
XLI	1959	1 March	Madrid	Casa de Campo	
XLII	1960	6 March	San Sebastián	Hipódromo de Lasarte	
XLIII	1961	12 March	Guecho	Fadura	
XLIV	1962	11 March	Santander	Hipódromo de Bellavista	
XLV	1963	3 March	Madrid	Casa de Campo	
XLVI	1964	8 March	San Sebastián	Hipódromo de Lasarte	
XLVII	1965	7 March	Palencia	La Balastera	
XLVIII	1966	6 March	Viladecans	El Toro Bravo	
XLIX	1967	5 March	Valencia	Antiguo cauce del Turia	
L	1968	3 March	Barreda		
LI	1969	9 March	Guecho	Campo de Gobelas y alrededores	
LII	1970	8 March	San Sebastián	Hipódromo de Lasarte	
LIII	1971	7 March	San Sebastián	Hipódromo de Lasarte	
LIV	1972	5 March	Granollers	Estadio y alrededores	
LV	1973	4 March	Gijón	Hipódromo de las Mestas	
LVI	1974	3 March	Laredo	Camping de Laredo	
LVII	1975	2 March	Sevilla	Hipódromo de Pineda	
LVIII	1976	15 February	San Sebastián	Hipódromo de Lasarte	
LIX	1977	6 March	Sabadell	Bosque de Can Deu	
LX	1978	5 March	Alsasua	Complejo Deportivo Dantzaleku	
LXI	1979	11 March	Vic	Finca El Pujolar	
LXII	1980	24 February	San Sebastián	Hipódromo de Lasarte	
LXIII	1981	14 March	Madrid	Hipódromo de La Zarzuela	
LXIV	1982	28 February	Lleida		
LXV	1983	6 March	Zarauz	Real Club de Golf de Zarauz	
LXVI	1984	10 March	Madrid	Hipódromo de La Zarzuela	
LXVII	1985	10 March	Fene	Circuito de Belelle	
LXVIII	1986	9 March	Barbastro		
LXIX	1987	1 March	San Sebastián	Hipódromo de Zubieta	
LXX	1988	6 March	Maliaño		
LXXI	1989	5 March	Baiona	Circuito Chan da Lagoa	
LXXII	1990	11 March	Estella		
LXXIII	1991	3 March	Logroño		
LXXIV	1992	8 March	Cáceres	Complejo Deportivo de la Diputación	
LXXV	1993	7 March	Amorebieta	Campas de Jaureguibarria	
LXXVI	1994	6 March	Zarauz		
LXXVII	1995	5 March	Vitoria	Campas de Salburúa	
LXXVIII	1996	10 March	Logroño	Polígono Industrial de San Lázaro	
LXXIX	1997	2 March	Alcorcón	Prado de Santo Domingo	
LXXX	1998	8 March	Vitoria		
LXXXI	1999	14 March	San Miguel del Camino	León Club de Golf	
LXXXII	2000	5 March	Ourense	Parque Tecnológico de Galicia	
LXXXIII	2001	4 March	O Burgo		
LXXXIV	2002	9/10 March	Vitoria	Parque de Gamarra	
LXXXV	2003	8/9 March	Ibiza	Sa Joveira	
LXXXVI	2004	28/29 February	Santiago de Compostela	Circuito de Monte do Gozo	
LXXXVII	2005	27 February	Toro	Circuito de Monte la Reina	
LXXXVIII	2006	19 March	La Morgal / Llanera		
LXXXIX	2007	11 March	Cáceres	Complejo Deportivo de la Diputación	
XC	2008	16 March	Tarancón	Pradera Ermita de Riansares	
XCI	2009	15 March	Albacete	Parque Periurbano La Pulgosa	
XCII	2010	7 March	A Coruña	Circuito Torre de Hércules	
XCIII	2011	27 February	Haro	Circuito de El Mazo	
XCIV	2012	4 March	Gijón	Parque Fluvial de Viesques	
XCV	2013	10 March	Granollers	Pista de Atletismo de Granollers	
XCVI	2014	16 March	Mérida	Circuito Circo Romano	
XCVII	2015	15 March	Alcobendas	Parque de Andalucía	
XCVIII	2016	13 March	Calatayud	Paraje de La Serna	
XCIX	2017	12 March	Gijón	Parque Fluvial de Viesques	
C	2018	11 March	Mérida	Circuito Circo Romano	
CI	2019	10 March	Cáceres	Complejo Deportivo Provincial El Cuartillo	
CII	2020	8 March	Zaragoza	Parque Lineal de Plaza	
CIII	2021	28 February	Getafe	Cerro de Los Angeles	
CIV	2022	30 January	Jaén	Circuito de Campo a Través Sebastián Barajas	
CV	2023	29 January	Ortuella	Circuito Las Balsas	

== Winners ==
=== Men ===
Year	Senior		Under-23		Under-20	
Year	Individual	Team	Individual	Team	Individual	Team
1916	Pedro Prat	Cataluña				
1917	Pedro Prat (2)	Cataluña				
1918	Víctor Errauzquín	Guipúzcoa				
1919	Julio Domínguez	Guipúzcoa				
1920	Julio Domínguez (2)	Vizcaya				
1921	José Andía	Guipúzcoa				
1922	Miguel Peña	Guipúzcoa				
1923	Amador Palma	Guipúzcoa				
1924	José Andía (2)	Cataluña				
1925	Amador Palma (2)	Cataluña				
1926	Miguel Palau	Cataluña				
1927	Amador Palma (3)	Cataluña				
1928	Arturo Peña	Cataluña				
1929	Jesús Oyarbide	Vizcaya				
1930	Juan Ramos	Vizcaya				
1931	Arturo Peña (2)	Cataluña				
1932	Miguel Celayeta	Guipúzcoa				
1933	Manuel Andreu	Cataluña				
1934	Jerónimo Juan	Cataluña				
1935	Jerónimo Juan (2)	Cataluña				
1936	Juan Ramos (2)	Castilla				
1937	Not held					
1938	Not held					
1939	Not held					
1940	Francisco Cami	Centro				
1941	Manuel Andreu (2)	Cataluña				
1942	Manuel Andreu (3)	Cataluña				
1943	Antonio Gómez Urtiaga	Cataluña				
1944	Antonio Gómez Urtiaga (2)	Cataluña				
1945	Antonio Gómez Urtiaga (3)	Cataluña				
1946	Constantino Miranda	Cataluña				
1947	Constantino Miranda (2)	Cataluña				
1948	José Coll	Cataluña				
1949	Constantino Miranda (3)	Cataluña				
1950	Buenaventura Baldomá	Cataluña				
1951	Constantino Miranda (4)	Cataluña				
1952	Buenaventura Baldomá (2)	Cataluña				
1953	José Coll (2)	Cataluña				
1954	Antonio Amorós	Cataluña				
1955	Antonio Amorós (2)	Cataluña				
1956	Luis García	Centro			Félix Arribas	
1957	Antonio Amorós (3)	Cataluña			Dimas Ramos	
1958	Antonio Amorós (4)	Cataluña			Dimas Ramos (2)	
1959	Carlos Pérez	Barcelona			Fernando Aguilar	Guipúzcoa
1960	Carlos Pérez (2)	Barcelona			Leonardo Banacloches	Guipúzcoa
1961	Antonio Amorós (5)	Barcelona			Mariano Haro	Guipúzcoa
1962	Mariano Haro	Barcelona			Jesús Fernández	Guipúzcoa
1963	Mariano Haro (2)	Barcelona			Antonio Gómez	Barcelona
1964	Francisco Aritmendi	Barcelona			Juan Hidalgo	Madrid
1965	Francisco Aritmendi (2)	Barcelona			José María Morera	Madrid
1966	Fernando Aguilar	Barcelona			José María Morera (2)	Barcelona
1967	Fernando Aguilar (2)	Barcelona			Francisco Javier Collado	Barcelona
1968	Mariano Haro (3)	Guipúzcoa			Juan José Sordo	Santander
1969	Mariano Haro (4)	Guipúzcoa			Felipe de los Bueys	Madrid
1970	Juan Hidalgo	Madrid			Ramón Sánchez Ferreira	Pontevedra
1971	Mariano Haro (5)	Madrid			Ramón Sánchez Ferreira (2)	Madrid
1972	Mariano Haro (6)	Madrid			Fernando Cerrada	Madrid
1973	Mariano Haro (7)	Pontevedra			José Haro	Madrid
1974	Mariano Haro (8)	Madrid			Manuel Pérez	Madrid
1975	Mariano Haro (9)	Madrid			José Luis González	Palencia
1976	Mariano Haro (10)	Madrid			José Luis González (2)	Madrid
1977	Mariano Haro (11)	Madrid			Santiago Llorente	Madrid
1978	Fernando Cerrada	Madrid			Francisco Javier Cortés	Madrid
1979	Fernando Cerrada (2)	Madrid			José María Maestre	Barcelona
1980	José Luis González	Toledo			Jordi García	La Coruña
1981	José Luis González (2)	Barcelona			Abel Antón	Madrid
1982	Antonio Prieto	Barcelona			José Manuel Albentosa	Valencia
1983	Antonio Prieto (2)	Madrid			José Manuel Albentosa (2)	Madrid
1984	Antonio Prieto (3)	Madrid			Pere Casacuberta	Barcelona
1985	Constantino Esparcia	Madrid			José Manuel García	Pontevedra
1986	Vicente Polo	(Community of Madrid) Madrid	Alejandro Gómez	(Galicia (Spain)) Galicia	Mariano Campal	(Galicia (Spain)) Galicia
1987	Constantino Esparcia (3)	(Castile and León) Castilla y León	Alejandro Gómez (2)	(Galicia (Spain)) Galicia (2)	Jesús Ángel Gálvez	(Castilla–La Mancha) Castilla-La Mancha
1988	Constantino Esparcia (4)	(Castilla–La Mancha) Castilla-La Mancha	Alejandro Gómez (3)	(Galicia (Spain)) Galicia (3)	Juan Manuel Abad	(Catalonia) Cataluña
1989	Alejandro Gómez	(Castilla–La Mancha) Castilla-La Mancha (2)	Jesús Ángel Gálvez	Held with senior race	David Pujolar	(Catalonia) Cataluña (2)
1990	Martín Fiz	(Castilla–La Mancha) Castilla-La Mancha (3)	Mariano Castro	Held with senior race	Javier Caballero	(Catalonia) Cataluña (3)
1991	Antonio Prieto (4)	(Castilla–La Mancha) Castilla-La Mancha (4)	Teodoro Cuñado	Held with senior race	Mateo Cañellas	(Catalonia) Cataluña (4)
1992	Martín Fiz (2)	(Galicia (Spain)) Galicia	Juan Puerta	Held with senior race	Eliseo Martín	(Castile and León) Castilla y León
1993	Francisco Guerra	(Castile and León) Castilla y León (2)	Juan Puerta (2)	Held with senior race	Francisco Rodríguez	(Catalonia) Cataluña (5)
1994	Carlos Adán	(Community of Madrid) Madrid (2)	Pedro Trejo	Held with senior race	Reyes Estévez	(Galicia (Spain)) Galicia (2)
1995	Alejandro Gómez (2)	(Galicia (Spain)) Galicia (2)	Alberto Vicente	Held with senior race	Reyes Estévez (2)	(Galicia (Spain)) Galicia (3)
1996	José Manuel García	(Catalonia) Cataluña	Carlos García	Held with senior race	David Posada	(Andalusia) Andalucía
1997	Julio Rey	(Castile and León) Castilla y León (3)	Iván Sánchez	Held with senior race	Juan José Lozano	(Catalonia) Cataluña (6)
1998	Julio Rey (2)	(Catalonia) Cataluña (2)	Juan José Gómez	Held with senior race	Miguel Ángel Pinto	(Castile and León) Castilla y León (2)
1999	Fabián Roncero	(Community of Madrid) Madrid (3)	Juan Carlos Higuero	Held with senior race	Pedro Nimo	(Castile and León) Castilla y León (3)
2000	Enrique Molina	(Catalonia) Cataluña (3)	Jesús España	Held with senior race	José Manuel Abascal	(Community of Madrid) Madrid
2001	Fabián Roncero (2)	(Community of Madrid) Madrid (4)	Iván Galán	(Castilla–La Mancha) Castilla-La Mancha	Sergio Sánchez	(Castile and León) Castilla y León (4)
2002	José Manuel Martínez (long) Antonio David Jiménez (short)	(Castile and León) Castilla y León (4) (long) (Castile and León) Castilla y León (short)	Ricardo Serrano	(Castilla–La Mancha) Castilla-La Mancha (2)	Javier Guerra	(Community of Madrid) Madrid (2)
2003	Fabián Roncero (3) (long) Yousef El Nasri (short)	(Castilla–La Mancha) Castilla-La Mancha (5) (long) (Catalonia) Cataluña (short)	Sergio Sánchez	(Community of Madrid) Madrid	Alejandro González	(Community of Madrid) Madrid (3)
2004	Juan Carlos de la Ossa (long) Antonio Martínez (short)	(Catalonia) Cataluña (4) (long) Extremadura (short)	Francisco Javier López	(Castile and León) Castilla y León	Alejandro Fernández	Extremadura
2005	Juan Carlos de la Ossa (2) (long) Roberto García (short)	(Castilla–La Mancha) Castilla-La Mancha (6) (long) (Castile and León) Castilla y León (short)	Javier Guerra	(Castile and León) Castilla y León (2)	José España	(Castile and León) Castilla y León (5)
2006	Juan Carlos de la Ossa (3) (long) José Luis Blanco (short)	(Castilla–La Mancha) Castilla-La Mancha (7) (long) (Catalonia) Cataluña (short)	Francisco José Bachiller	(Community of Madrid) Madrid (2)	Mohamed Elbendir	(Castile and León) Castilla y León (6)
2007	Juan Carlos de la Ossa (4)	(Catalonia) Cataluña (5)	Daniel Pérez	(Castilla–La Mancha) Castilla-La Mancha (3)	Mohamed Elbendir (2)	(Castile and León) Castilla y León (7)
2008	Juan Carlos de la Ossa (5)	(Catalonia) Cataluña (6)	José Luis Galván	Extremadura	Víctor Corrales	(Community of Madrid) Madrid (4)
2009	Alemayehu Bezabeh	(Catalonia) Cataluña (7)	Mohamed Elbendir	(Castile and León) Castilla y León (3)	Mario Mola	(Catalonia) Cataluña (7)
2010	Alemayehu Bezabeh (2)	(Castilla–La Mancha) Castilla-La Mancha (8)	Mohamed Elbendir (2)	(Castile and León) Castilla y León (4)	Aitor Fernández	(Community of Madrid) Madrid (5)
2011	Ayad Lamdassem	(Catalonia) Cataluña (8)	Daniel Mateo	(Andalusia) Andalucía	Daniel Arce	(Castilla–La Mancha) Castilla-La Mancha (2)
2012	Carles Castillejo	(Castile and León) Castilla y León (5)	Antonio Abadía	(Castile and León) Castilla y León (5)	Ángel Ronco	(Catalonia) Cataluña (8)
2013	Sergio Sánchez	(Catalonia) Cataluña (9)	Abdelaziz Merzougui	(Community of Madrid) Madrid (3)	Mohamed Ali Jelloul	(Catalonia) Cataluña (9)
2014	Ayad Lamdassem (2)	(Castilla–La Mancha) Castilla-La Mancha (9)	Ángel Ronco	(Catalonia) Cataluña	Carlos Mayo	(Community of Madrid) Madrid (6)
2015	Antonio Abadía	(Castile and León) Castilla y León (6)	Carlos Mayo	(Castile and León) Castilla y León (6)	Ayoub Mokhtar	(Catalonia) Cataluña (10)
2016	Antonio Abadía (2)	(Community of Madrid) Madrid (5)	Ayoub Mokhtar	(Castilla–La Mancha) Castilla-La Mancha (4)	Ossama Ifraj	(Galicia (Spain)) Galicia (4)
2017	Adel Mechaal	(Castile and León) Castilla y León (7)	Jesús Ramos	(Community of Madrid) Madrid (4)	Miguel González	(Catalonia) Cataluña (11)
2018	Ayad Lamdassem (3)	(Community of Madrid) Madrid (6)	Adrián Ben	(Community of Madrid) Madrid (5)	Ouassim Oumaiz	(Castile and León) Castilla y León (8)
2019	Ouassim Oumaiz	(Catalonia) Cataluña (10)	Adrián Ben (2)	(Castile and León) Castilla y León (7)	Miguel Baidal	(Community of Madrid) Madrid (7)
2020	Carlos Mayo	(Community of Madrid) Madrid (7)	Ouassim Oumaiz	(Catalonia) Cataluña (2)	Pol Oriach	(Castile and León) Castilla y León (9)
2021	Carlos Mayo (2)	(Catalonia) Cataluña (11)	Eduardo Menacho	(Castile and León) Castilla y León (8)	Pol Oriach (2)	Aragon
2022	Adel Mechaal (2)	(Catalonia) Cataluña (12)	Adam Maijo	(Castile and León) Castilla y León (9)	Jaime Migallon	(Community of Madrid) Madrid (8)
2023	Adel Mechaal (3)	(Valencian Community) Communidad Valenciana	Miguel Ángel Martínez	(Valencian Community) Communidad Valenciana	Sergio Del Barrio	(Catalonia) Cataluña (12)

=== Women ===
Year	Senior		Under-23		Under-20	
Year	Individual	Team	Individual	Team	Individual	Team
1965	Maria Aránzazu Vega	La Coruña				
1966	Maria Aránzazu Vega (2)	La Coruña				
1967	Coro Fuentes	La Coruña				
1968	Coro Fuentes (2)	Guipúzcoa				
1969	Belén Azpeitia	Guipúzcoa				
1970	Belén Azpeitia (2)	Guipúzcoa				
1971	Belén Azpeitia (3)	Guipúzcoa				
1972	Belén Azpeitia (4)	Guipúzcoa				
1973	Carmen Valero	Guipúzcoa				
1974	Carmen Valero (2)	Madrid				
1975	Carmen Valero (3)	Barcelona				
1976	Carmen Valero (4)	Barcelona				
1977	Carmen Valero (5)	Barcelona				
1978	Carmen Valero (6)	Barcelona			Rosa Talavera	
1979	Pilar Fernández-Valderrama	Madrid			Asunción Sinobas	
1980	Amelia Lorza	Madrid			Begoña Martín	Barcelona
1981	Carmen Valero (7)	Madrid			Carol Rosset	Barcelona
1982	Mercedes Calleja	Madrid			Laura Blanco	Barcelona
1983	Pilar Fernández-Valderrama (2)	Barcelona			Laura Blanco (2)	Pontevedra
1984	Ana Isabel Alonso	Barcelona			Maria Jesús Montoya	Madrid
1985	Ana Isabel Alonso (2)	Barcelona			Begoña Herráez	Pontevedra
1986	Carmen Valero (8)	(Community of Madrid) Madrid	Lidia Calvo	(Community of Madrid) Madrid	Mónica Argüello	(Castile and León) Castilla y León
1987	Ana Isabel Alonso (3)	(Catalonia) Cataluña	Dolores Rizo	(Catalonia) Cataluña	Angelines Rodríguez	(Castile and León) Castilla y León (2)
1988	Ana Isabel Alonso (4)	(Catalonia) Cataluña (2)	Dolores Rizo (2)	(Catalonia) Cataluña (2)	Angelines Rodríguez (2)	(Catalonia) Cataluña
1989	Ana Isabel Alonso (5)	(Community of Madrid) Madrid (2)	Dolores Rizo (3)	Held with senior race	Julia Vaquero	(Catalonia) Cataluña (2)
1990	Ana Isabel Alonso (6)	(Catalonia) Cataluña (3)	Julia Vaquero	Held with senior race	Isabel Martínez	(Castile and León) Castilla y León (3)
1991	Luisa Larraga	(Community of Madrid) Madrid (3)	Luisa Larraga	Held with senior race	Ana Isabel Gimeno	(Community of Madrid) Madrid
1992	Julia Vaquero	(Castile and León) Castilla y León	Eugenia Cordero	Held with senior race	Ana Isabel Gimeno (2)	(Castile and León) Castilla y León (4)
1993	Julia Vaquero (2)	(Castile and León) Castilla y León (2)	Sonia Álvarez	Held with senior race	Rocío Martínez	(Community of Madrid) Madrid (2)
1994	Julia Vaquero (3)	(Catalonia) Cataluña (4)	Jacqueline Martín	Held with senior race	Paula Hernández	(Catalonia) Cataluña (3)
1995	Julia Vaquero (4)	(Castile and León) Castilla y León (3)	Jacqueline Martín (2)	Held with senior race	Paula Hernández (2)	(Catalonia) Cataluña (4)
1996	Julia Vaquero (5)	(Castile and León) Castilla y León (4)	Esther Salim	Held with senior race	Judit Plá	(Catalonia) Cataluña (5)
1997	Julia Vaquero (6)	(Castile and León) Castilla y León (5)	Silvia Montané	Held with senior race	Judit Plá (2)	(Catalonia) Cataluña (6)
1998	Julia Vaquero (7)	(Basque Country (autonomous community)) País Vasco	Manuela Domínguez	Held with senior race	Vanessa Veiga	(Catalonia) Cataluña (7)
1999	Ana Isabel Alonso (7)	(Castile and León) Castilla y León (6)	Manuela Domínguez (2)	Held with senior race	Irene Alfonso	(Catalonia) Cataluña (8)
2000	María Abel	(Galicia (Spain)) Galicia	Alessandra Aguilar	Held with senior race	Sonia Bejarano	(Castile and León) Castilla y León (5)
2001	Jacqueline Martín	(Catalonia) Cataluña (5)	Rosa Morató	Held with senior race	Amparo Menéndez	(Castile and León) Castilla y León (6)
2002	Luisa Larraga (2) (long) Luisa Larraga (short)	(Galicia (Spain)) Galicia (2) (Basque Country (autonomous community)) País Vasco	Rosana Fernández	Held with senior race	Alba García	Asturias
2003	María Abel (2) (long) Iris Fuentes-Pila (short)	(Castile and León) Castilla y León (7) (Catalonia) Cataluña	Sonia Bejarano	(Castile and León) Castilla y León	Isabel Macías	(Catalonia) Cataluña (9)
2004	Amaia Piedra (long) Jacqueline Martín (short)	(Basque Country (autonomous community)) País Vasco (2) (Catalonia) Cataluña (2)	Alba García	Asturias	Marta Fernández	(Catalonia) Cataluña (10)
2005	Rosa Morató (long) Jacqueline Martín (2) (short)	(Catalonia) Cataluña (6) Cantabria	Teresa Urbina	(Catalonia) Cataluña (3)	Marta Romo	(Castile and León) Castilla y León (7)
2006	Marta Domínguez (long) Zulema Fuentes-Pila (short)	(Catalonia) Cataluña (7) (Galicia (Spain)) Galicia	Teresa Urbina (2)	(Catalonia) Cataluña (4)	Marta Romo (2)	(Catalonia) Cataluña (11)
2007	Rosa Morató (2)	(Catalonia) Cataluña (8)	María Sánchez	(Galicia (Spain)) Galicia	Cristina Jordán	(Catalonia) Cataluña (12)
2008	Rosa Morató (3)	(Catalonia) Cataluña (9)	María Sánchez (2)	(Community of Madrid) Madrid (2)	Cristina Jordán (2)	(Castile and León) Castilla y León (8)
2009	Rosa Morató (4)	(Catalonia) Cataluña (10)	Cristina Jordán	(Castile and León) Castilla y León	Sandra Mosquera	(Castile and León) Castilla y León (9)
2010	Rosa Morató (5)	(Catalonia) Cataluña (11)	Cristina Jordán (2)	(Castile and León) Castilla y León (2)	Estefanía Tobal	(Castile and León) Castilla y León (10)
2011	Nuria Fernández	(Catalonia) Cataluña (12)	Solange Pereira	(Castile and León) Castilla y León (3)	Blanca Fernández	(Castile and León) Castilla y León (11)
2012	Diana Martín	(Catalonia) Cataluña (13)	Estefanía Tobal	(Catalonia) Cataluña (5)	Beatriz Caspar	(Catalonia) Cataluña (13)
2013	Gema Barrachina	Cantabria	Tania Carretero	(Castile and León) Castilla y León (4)	Adriana Gutiérrez	(Catalonia) Cataluña (14)
2014	Nuria Fernández (2)	Cantabria (2)	Blanca Fernández	(Castile and León) Castilla y León (5)	Carmela Cardama	(Community of Madrid) Madrid (3)
2015	Trihas Gebre	(Community of Madrid) Madrid (4)	Claudia Estévez	(Catalonia) Cataluña (6)	Celia Antón	(Galicia (Spain)) Galicia
2016	Trihas Gebre (2)	(Castile and León) Castilla y León (8)	Cristina Espejo	(Basque Country (autonomous community)) País Vasco	Celia Antón (2)	(Castile and León) Castilla y León (12)
2017	Trihas Gebre (3)	(Castilla–La Mancha) Castilla-La Mancha	Paula González	(Castile and León) Castilla y León (6)	Lucía Rodríguez	(Castile and León) Castilla y León (13)
2018	Trihas Gebre (4)	(Castile and León) Castilla y León (9)	Paula González (2)	(Castile and León) Castilla y León (7)	Carla Gallardo	(Castile and León) Castilla y León (14)
2019	Trihas Gebre (5)	(Castile and León) Castilla y León (10)	Celia Antón	(Castile and León) Castilla y León (8)	Elia Saura	(Catalonia) Cataluña (15)
2020	Irene Sánchez-Escribano	(Community of Madrid) Madrid (5)	Isabel Barreiro	(Castile and León) Castilla y León (9)	Ángela Viciosa	(Castile and León) Castilla y León (15)
2021	Irene Sánchez-Escribano (2)	(Castilla–La Mancha) Castilla-La Mancha (2)	Cristina Ruiz	(Castile and León) Castilla y León (10)	Carla Dominguez	(Catalonia) Cataluña (16)
2022	Carla Gallardo	(Castile and León) Castilla y León (11)	Andrea Romero	(Catalonia) Cataluña (8)	Carla Dominguez (2)	(Catalonia) Cataluña (17)
2023	Joselyn Brea	(Castile and León) Castilla y León (12)	Ángela Viciosa	(Galicia (Spain)) Galicia (2)	Maria Viciosa	(Catalonia) Cataluña (18)
