= 1923 USA Outdoor Track and Field Championships =

American athletics championship event

- Dates: September 1 (men); September 29 (women)
- Host city: Chicago, Illinois (men); Newark, New Jersey (women)
- Venue: Stagg Field (men); Weequahic Park (women)
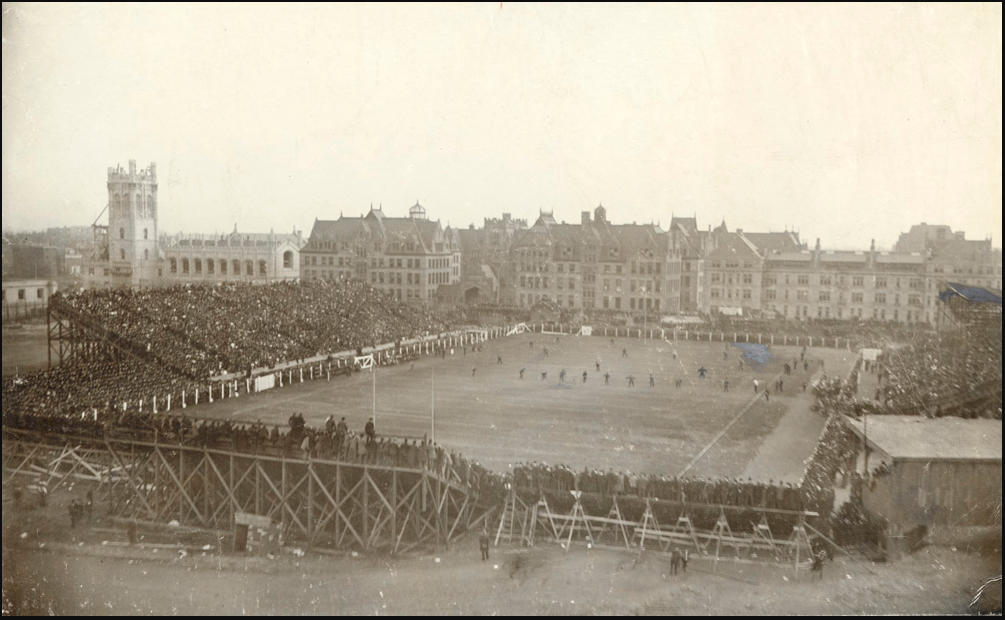

The 1923 USA Outdoor Track and Field Championships were organized by the Amateur Athletic Union (AAU) and served as the national championships in outdoor track and field for the United States. The year marked the first ever women's U.S. track and field championships.

The men's edition was held at Stagg Field in Chicago, Illinois, and it took place September 1. The women's meet was held separately at Weequahic Park in Newark, New Jersey, on September 29.

== Men's competition ==
At the men's championships, meet records were broken in the high jump, pole vault, discus, and javelin.

== Women's competition ==
The women's competition was the first national track and field championships for women in the United States. The tournament was held on 29 September 1923 at Weequahic Park in Newark, New Jersey.

=== Background ===
After the initial Women's World Games in 1922 in Paris and the three Women's Olympiads in Monaco (1921 Women's Olympiad, 1922 Women's Olympiad and 1923 Women's World Games), interest in women's sports grew internationally. In 1922, the Women's Amateur Athletic Association (WAAA) was founded in the United Kingdom. The WAAA organized the first official British women's championships in track and field (WAAA Championships) on 18 August 1923 at the Oxo Sports Ground in Downham outside London. (Note: In the United Kingdom, the first women's university teams competed in track and field in 1921 and the Inter-Varsity Athletics Board (IVAB) in England held its first inter-varsity track and field competition for women in 1922. The Women's Inter-Varsity Athletics Board (WIVAB) was formed in 1923.)

In the United States, the Amateur Athletic Union (AAU) was founded in 1888, and held its first national championship for women in the sport of swimming in 1916. In 1922, try-outs for the 1922 Women's World Games were held on 13 May at Oaksmere School in Mamaroneck, New York. Some historians consider this event to be the first "national" women's track meet.

In 1923, the AAU sponsored the first official American women's championships in track and field.

=== Events ===
The meet was held on 29 September 1923 at Weequahic Park in Newark, New Jersey. Female athletes for the 1923 games also trained at Weequahic Park.

The athletes competed in 11 events: running 50 yards, 100 yards, relay race 4×110 yards, hurdling 60 yards, high jump, long jump, discus throw, shot put, javelin, baseball throw (softball throw) and basketball throw. The tournament was a huge promotion for women's sports.

== Results ==
=== Men ===
Event	Gold		Silver		Bronze	
100 yards	Loren Murchison	10.1	Albert Washington		Chester Bowman	
220 yards	Loren Murchison	22.3	Frederick Lovejoy		Manville Lechnicht	
440 yards	Horatio Fitch	50.0	Arthur Wolters		Hilding Hagen	
880 yards	Ray Watson	1:57.2	Alan Helffrich	1 yard behind	James Connolly	
1 mile	Joseph Ray	4:18.0	Ray Buker		Lloyd Hahn	
5 miles	Earl Johnson	26:05.4	Verne Booth		James Henigan	
120 yards hurdles	Karl Anderson	15.1	Ivan Riley		Daniel Kinsey	
440 yards hurdles	Ivan Riley	55.4	John Norton		Richard Oram	
2 miles steeplechase	Ville Ritola (FIN)	10:45.6	Marvin Rick		Russell Payne	
High jump	LeRoy Brown	1.97 m	Harold Osborn	1.92 m	Richmond Landon	1.92 m
Pole vault	Edwin Myers	3.99 m	Edward Knourek	3.81 m	James Brooker	3.81 m
Long jump	William DeHart Hubbard	7.51 m	Robert LeGendre	7.10 m	Edward Gourdin	7.05 m
Triple jump	William DeHart Hubbard	14.34 m	Kaufman Geist	14.27 m	Anthony Plansky	13.78 m
Shot put	Orville Wanzer	14.34 m	Charles Eastman	14.10 m	Clarence Houser	14.04 m
Discus throw	Thomas Lieb	46.12 m	Augustus Pope	45.19 m	Clarence Houser	45.01 m
Hammer throw	Fredrick Tootell	52.90 m	Matthew McGrath	50.33 m	Basil Bennett	48.27 m
Javelin throw	Harry Hoffman	59.32 m	Harry Frieda	58.21 m	Flint Hanner	55.90 m
Decathlon	Harold Osborn	7351.89 pts	Harry Frieda	6760.06 pts	Emerson Norton	6583.60 pts
220 yards hurdles	Charles Brookins	24.5				
Weight throw for distance	Matt McGrath	11.58 m				

=== Women ===
Event	Gold		Silver		Bronze	
50 yds	Marion McCartie; City Bank Club	6,06sec	Frances Ruppert; Meadowbrook Club		Mabel Steel; Camp Alamo	
100 yds	Frances Ruppert; Meadowbrook Club	12,0 sec	Marion McCartie; City Bank Club		Madeline Adams; Meadowbrook Club	
Relay 4×110 yds	Meadowbrook Club; Philadelphia	52,4 sec	City Bank Club; New York		Board of Recreation; Paterson, NJ	
Hurdling 60 yds	Hazel Kirk; Prudential Insurance	9,6 sec	Esther Behring; Prudential Insurance		Rose Garlock; Newark Normal School	
High jump	Catherine Wright; Bridgeport A.C.	4 ft 7½ in	Helen Dinnehey; Shanahan CC	4 ft 6 ¼ in	Ida Robinson; Philadelphia Turngemeinde	4 ft 5 ¼ in
Long jump	Helen Dinnehey; Shanahan CC	15 ft 4 in	Alice Adams; Prudential Insurance	15 ft ½ in	Florence Bitner; Meadowbrook Club	14 ft
Discus throw	Babe Wolbert; UNAT	71 ft 9½ in	Roberta Ranck; Philadelphia Turngemeinde	70 ft 10 in	Carrie Gerold; Bridgeport A.C.	65 ft 10½ in
Shot put 8 lb	Bertha Christophel; GATC	30 ft 10½ in	Roberta Ranck; Philadelphia Turngemeinde	29 ft 10 5/8 in	Gladys Booth; Prudential Insurance	28 ft 3 in
Javelin throw	Roberta Ranck; Philadelphia Turngemeinde	59 ft 7¾ in	Jeanette Casper; Bridgeport A.C.	59 ft 1½ in	Gladys Booth; Prudential Insurance	58 ft 8 in
Softball throw	Elinor Churchill; Robinson F.S.	234 ft 5¾ in	Mildred Crotty; Bridgeport A.C	222 ft 9½ in	Grace Castor; Philadelphia Turngemeinde	204 ft 4 in
Basketball throw	Esther Behring; Prudential Insurance	87 ft 6 in	Elinor Churchill; Robinson F.S.	86 ft 8 in	Grace Castor; Philadelphia Turngemeinde	80 ft 7 in

Elinor Churchill's baseball throw of 234 feet, 5 ¾ inches also was a new world record, improving her record set the previous year by more than 10 feet.

== See also ==
- 1923 USA Indoor Track and Field Championships
- List of USA Outdoor Track and Field Championships winners (men)
- List of USA Outdoor Track and Field Championships winners (women)
