= Athletics at the 1924 Summer Olympics – Men's 10,000 metres =

Men's 10,000 metres at the Games of the VIII Olympiad
- Venue: Stade Olympique Yves-du-Manoir
- Dates: July 6, 1924
- Competitors: 33–36 from 16 nations

Medalists
1st place, gold medalist(s)		Ville Ritola; Finland
2nd place, silver medalist(s)		Edvin Wide; Sweden
3rd place, bronze medalist(s)		Eero Berg; Finland

The men's 10,000 metres event was part of the track and field athletics programme at the 1924 Summer Olympics. The competition was held on Sunday, July 6, 1924.

Paavo Nurmi the greatest long-distance runner at that time did not compete in this race, as the Finnish officials asked him not to start in this event. They thought he was entered in too many competitions. Only a few weeks after the Olympics on August 31 Nurmi set a new world record with 30:06.2 in Kuopio.

As for all other races the track was 500 metres in circumference.

The exact number of starters is unknown, but photographs show around 35 competitors. At least 33 - maybe 36 - long-distance runners from 16 nations competed.

== Records ==
These were the standing world and Olympic records (in minutes) prior to the 1924 Summer Olympics.

World record	30:35.4	(Finland) Ville Ritola	Helsinki (FIN)	May 25, 1924
Olympic record	31:20.8	Hannes Kolehmainen	Stockholm (SWE)	July 8, 1912

Ville Ritola set a new world record with 30:23.2 minutes.

== Results ==
Place	Athlete	Time
1	Ville Ritola (FIN)	30:23.2 WR
2	Edvin Wide (SWE)	30:55.2
3	Eero Berg (FIN)	31:43.0
4	Väinö Sipilä (FIN)	31:50.2
5	Ernie Harper (GBR)	31:58.0
6	Halland Britton (GBR)	32:06.0
7	Guillaume Tell (FRA)	32:12.0
8	Earle Johnson (USA)	32:17.0
9	Robert Marchal (FRA)	32:33.0
10	Artūrs Motmillers (LAT)	32:44.0
11	Henri Lauvaux (FRA)	32:48.0
12	Gaston Heuet (FRA)	32:52.0
13	Sven Thuresson (SWE)	no time
14	Charles Clibbon (GBR)	no time
15	John Gray (USA)	no time
16	Sidon Ebeling (SWE)	no time
—	Eddie Webster (GBR)	DNF
—	Gösta Bergström (SWE)	DNF
—	Verne Booth (USA)	DNF
—	Wayne Johnson (USA)	DNF
—	Camiel Van de Velde (BEL)	DNF
—	Anton Tsvetanov (BUL)	DNF
—	Vasil Venkov (BUL)	DNF
—	Pál Király (HUN)	DNF
—	John Ryan (IRL)	DNF
—	Pala Singh (IND)	DNF
—	Carlo Speroni (ITA)	DNF
—	Vilis Cimmermanis (LAT)	DNF
—	Alberto Jarrín (ECU)	DNF
—	Vyron Athanasiadis (GRE)	DNF
—	Alexandros Kranis (GRE)	DNF
—	Pedro Curiel (MEX)	DNF
—	Gurbachan Singh (IND)	?
—	Mareg Mangaschia (ITA)	?
—	Tacle Redda (ITA)	?

It is unknown if Singh Randhawa, Mangaschia, and Redda actually competed.
