= Väinö Sipilä =

Finnish long-distance runner

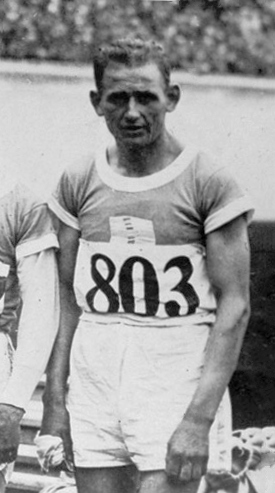
- Sipilä at the 1928 Olympics

Personal information
- Born: 24 December 1897 Pälkäne, Finland
- Died: 12 September 1987 (aged 89) Pälkäne, Finland
- Height: 175 cm (5 ft 9 in)
- Weight: 62 kg (137 lb)

Sport
- Sport: Athletics
- Club: Tampereen Pyrintö; Pälkäneen Lukko

Achievements and titles
- Personal bests: 5,000 m: 15.14.2 (1929); 10,000 m: 31.30.2 (1929); 20,000 m: 1:06:29.0 (1925); 30,000 m: 1:43:07.8 (1928); Marathon: 2:41:30.6 (1931)

Väinö Jeremias Sipilä (24 December 1897 – 12 September 1987) was a Finnish long-distance runner. Sipilä competed in the 1924 and 1928 Summer Olympics, placing fourth in the 10,000 metres and being part of Finland's winning cross-country team in the 1924 Games. He held world records at the unusual distances of 20,000 metres and 30,000 metres for several years.

== Career ==
Sipilä was Finnish cross country champion in 1923, 1924, 1925 and 1929. At the 1924 Summer Olympics in Paris Sipilä first placed fourth in the 10,000 m race (behind Ville Ritola, Edvin Wide and Eero Berg) and then took part in the 10.65 km cross-country race, which doubled as an individual and team competition. In the extremely hot and demanding conditions, more than half of the participants failed to finish, including Sipilä and two other members of the Finnish team, Berg and Eino Rastas; Finland only barely got a valid team result, even though its stars Paavo Nurmi and Ritola placed a clear first and second. Sipilä was in fourth place in the 6.2 km intermediate standings, ahead of eventual individual bronze medalist Earl Johnson of the United States, but had to drop out shortly after that point.

In 1925 Sipilä broke the world record at the unusual distance of 20,000 metres, running 1:06:29.0 in Stockholm and breaking Ville Kyrönen's record of 1:07:07.2 from the previous year. (Note: Fred Appleby had run 12 1/2 miles (20,117 m) in 1:06:42.2 as a split in a 15 mile race in 1902; no split at 20,000 metres had been taken for him.) At the 1928 Summer Olympics Sipilä represented Finland in the marathon, but only placed 15th; a month after the Olympics he broke the world record for 30,000 metres at Tampere, running 1:43:07.8. In the same race, Martti Marttelin broke the 25,000 m world record as a split.

Sipilä's 20,000 m record was broken in 1930 by Paavo Nurmi, who ran 1:04:38.4; Nurmi's 1928 hour record of 19,210 m would have been equal to a time close to 1:02:30. Sipilä's 30,000 m record was broken in 1931 by Argentina's Juan Carlos Zabala, who went on to win the 1932 Olympic marathon.

== Personal life and legacy ==
His daughter Leena became an Olympic sprint runner.

A road at Syrjänharju, Pälkäne, where Sipilä trained, has been named after him.

== Notes ==
Records
Preceded by (Finland) Ville Kyrönen	Men's 20,000 m world record holder 19 June 1925 – 3 September 1930	Succeeded by (Finland) Paavo Nurmi
Preceded by (Finland) Albin Stenroos	Men's 30,000 m world record holder 16 September 1928 – 10 October 1931	Succeeded by (Argentina) Juan Carlos Zabala
