= John Romig =

American long-distance runner (1898–1984)

- Born: October 6, 1898; Beaver Springs, Pennsylvania, U.S.
- Died: March 16, 1984 (aged 85); Kennett Square, Pennsylvania, U.S.
- Known for: NCAA champion, two-mile run (1921) 1924 Olympics (5,000 meters) and 1928 Olympics (10,000 meters); Spalding's All-American Athletic Team, Cross-Country (1921); USA indoor champion, two-mile run (1922); Explosives Expert with Atlas Chemical and Atlas Powder Co.

John Luther "Blondy" Romig (October 6, 1898 – March 16, 1984) was an American track and field athlete. He won collegiate championships in the two-mile race in 1921 and 1922, finished fourth in the 1924 Summer Olympics in the 5,000 meter race and competed in the 1928 Olympics in the 10,000 meters.

== Biography ==
=== Early years ===
Romig was born in Beaver Springs, Pennsylvania in 1898.

=== Collegiate middle distance champion ===
Romig enrolled at Penn State University where he became a star athlete in distance and cross-country running. He won the two-mile run at the first NCAA track and field championships in 1921 with a time of 9:31. He was Penn State's first NCAA track champion. Romig was also selected as the top cross-country runner for the All-American Athletic Team published in the annual Spalding's Official Athletic Almanac for 1921. In 1922, Romig won the USA Indoor Track & Field Championship in the two-mile race with a time of 9:21.2.

=== Olympic competition ===
In June 1924, Romig easily won the 5,000 meter race in the U.S. Olympic trials at Harvard Stadium in Cambridge, Massachusetts with a time of 15:15.7. Romig's victory was reported as follows:

"The running of John Romig of Penn State in the 5,000 meters event which he won by ten yards, was a beautiful exhibition and raised hopes that Uncle Sam may figure better than anticipated in this race at Paris. Romig jumped into the lead at the fourth lap and held it to the finish."

Romig finished fourth in 5,000 meter race at the Olympic games in Paris with a time of 15:12.4. The "Flying Finns," Paavo Nurmi and Ville Ritola, took the gold and silver medals, and a Swede, Edvin Wide, finished ahead of Romig for the bronze medal, though Romig had beaten Wide in the semi-finals. The Associated Press reported on Romig's performance in Paris as follows: "America had some consolation when John Romig, former intercollegiate cross-country champion, beat out Sipila [Eino Seppälä] of Finland for Fourth place."

Romig continued to compete following the 1924 Olympics, moving up in distance to the 10,000 meter race. Competing for the Meadowbrook Club in Philadelphia, he finished second in the 10,000 meter race at the 1928 Amateur Athletic Union championship.

Romig returned to Olympic competition in 1928. He ran for the United States in the 10,000 meter race in Amsterdam. The "Flying Finns," Nurmi and Ritola, won gold and silver in the event. Romig ran the later part of the race with a torn Achilles tendon.

=== Later years ===
After competing in the Olympics, Romig became a teacher and athletic coach at Kennett Square Consolidated High School in Kennett Square, Pennsylvania.

Romig later became known as an expert in explosives. He was the manager of Quarry Mining Industries and an executive with Atlas Chemical Industries (now known as AstraZeneca) and Atlas Powder Co. of Wilmington, Delaware. Two of his best known assignments were the design and testing of the "mill-second" delay blasting cap, which resulted in a new concept in controlling blasting, and the removal of four million cubic yards of rock at the Panama Canal's Gaillard Cut without interrupting shipping. Romig also supervised most of the blasting for the St. Lawrence Seaway and the George Washington Bridge. In April 1961, Romig was honored at the Penn Relays. In 1971, Romig was elected to the Board of Trustees of Penn State University.

Romig died on March 16, 1984, at the age of 85.

== See also ==
- List of Pennsylvania State University Olympians
- 1921 NCAA Men's Track and Field Championships
