= David McGill =

David McGill or MacGill may refer to:

- David McGill (athlete) (1901–1981), represented Canada at the 1924 Summer Olympics
- David McGill (bowls) (1947–2022), Scottish lawn and indoor bowler and commentator
- David McGill (footballer) (born 1981), Irish footballer
- David McGill (musician), American Grammy Award-winning bassoonist
- David McGill (soccer) (born 1960), Canadian soccer player
- David McGill (writer) (born 1942), New Zealand writer
- David MacGill (died 1595), Lord Advocate of Scotland
- David McGill, clerk of the Scottish Parliament since 2019

== See also ==
- David Gill (disambiguation)
