= Frank Saunders =

Frank Saunders may refer to:

- Frank Saunders (footballer) (1864–1905), English footballer
- Frank Saunders (rugby league) (1902–1978), Australian rugby league player
- Frank Saunders (athlete) (1899–1992), British long-distance runner
- Frank Saunders, American schoolteacher and congressional candidate in Georgia
