= Alberto Jarrín =

Ecuadorian long-distance runner

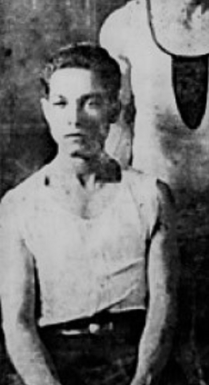
- Jarrín in 1924

Personal information
- Full name: Luis Alberto Jarrín Jaramillo
- Nationality: Ecuadorian
- Born: 20 April 1900 Cayambe, Ecuador
- Died: 30 August 1981 (aged 81) Quito, Ecuador

Sport
- Sport: Long-distance running
- Event: 10,000 metres

Luis Alberto Jarrín Jaramillo (20 April 1900 – 30 August 1981) was an Ecuadorian long-distance runner. Growing up, he played lawn tennis and table tennis before moving to athletics in college. He set the Ecuadorian national record in the marathon, becoming the first Ecuadorian man to run the distance under four hours. He was part of the first Ecuadorian delegation sent to the Summer Olympics, doing so at the 1924 Summer Olympics.

In 1926, Jarrín organized and competed in the first Ecuador National Games. He was active in the promotion of sport in Ecuador, giving out free sporting equipment. He frequently attended the Olympic Games, Pan American Games, and Bolivarian Games as either a spectator or part of a national delegation, at his own expense. Jarrín was posthumously honored with an honorary medal and the renaming of the Ecuadorian National Olympic Committee's Olympic Museum after him.

== Early life and education ==
Luis Alberto Jarrín Jaramillo was born on 20 April 1900 in Cayambe, Ecuador. Growing up, Jarrín was a table tennis and lawn tennis player. He graduated from the Central University of Ecuador with a degree in mechanics, where he started his athletics career. He was also a polyglot, having spoken English, French, German, Portuguese, Spanish, and Quechua.

== Career ==
In 1923, he set an Ecuadorian national record in the marathon, becoming the first Ecuadorian man to run under four hours. The following year, he was one of three athletes competing for Ecuador at the 1924 Summer Olympics in Paris. It took 31 days for his travel from Ecuador to Paris. At the games, he competed in the men's 10,000 metres event held at the Stade Olympique Yves-du-Manoir. He did not finish the event. He was also entered in the men's 5000 metres and cross country events but did not start in either. After the games, he "challenged" a train traveling from Quito to Ibarra to see which would arrive first. Jarrín beat the train by eight hours.

== Sports administration and later years ==
Jarrín organized the first Ecuador National Games in 1926 at the Estadio Olímpico de Riobamba. He also competed in the event, representing Pichincha in the men's 5000 and 10,000 metres. Outside of long-distance running, he also played tennis, chess, and was an avid fan of football. He was heavily involved with sports promotion within the country. He gave out free sporting equipment and was considered the "Father of the National Games". He returned to sport in 1956 and broke his own personal best in the marathon.

Jarrín attended every edition of the Olympic Games from 1928 to the 1980 Summer Olympics on his own expense, either as a spectator or in an official delegation position. At the 1980 Summer Games, he was awarded a plaque for his dedication to the Games. At the editions from 1956 to 1964, he was part of the Argentine delegation as a physical therapist, having learned the practice in Germany. He also attended every edition of the Pan American Games and Bolivarian Games before 1980 as a spectator. It was estimated that he spent around S/. 10,000,000 for his trips at these sporting events.

Jarrín died on 30 August 1981 in a traffic accident in Quito. In 2014, he was posthumously awarded an honorary medal by the Ecuadorian National Olympic Committee and the Ecuadorian Olympic Museum was renamed as the Alberto Jarrín Jaramillo Museum in his honor.
