= John Benham =

John Benham may refer to:

- John S. Benham (1863–1935), U.S. Representative from Indiana
- John Benham (athlete) (1900–1990), British athlete
