= Athletics at the 1924 Summer Olympics – Men's 5000 metres =

Men's 5000 metres at the Games of the VIII Olympiad
- Venue: Stade Olympique Yves-du-Manoir
- Dates: July 8, 1924 (semifinals); July 10, 1924 (final)
- Competitors: 38 from 21 nations

Medalists
1st place, gold medalist(s)		Paavo Nurmi; Finland
2nd place, silver medalist(s)		Ville Ritola; Finland
3rd place, bronze medalist(s)		Edvin Wide; Sweden

The men's 5000 metres event was part of the track and field athletics programme at the 1924 Summer Olympics. The competition was held on July 8, 1924, and on July 10, 1924. 38 long-distance runners from 21 nations competed.

== Records ==
These were the standing world and Olympic records (in minutes) prior to the 1924 Summer Olympics.

World record	14:28.2	(Finland) Paavo Nurmi	Helsinki (FIN)	June 19, 1924
Olympic record	14:36.6	Hannes Kolehmainen	Stockholm (SWE)	July 10, 1912

In the final Paavo Nurmi set a new Olympic record with 14:31.2 minutes.

== Results ==
=== Semifinals ===
All semi-finals were held on Tuesday, July 8, 1924.

The best four finishers of every heat qualified for the final.

Semifinal 1

Place	Athlete	Time	Qual.
1	Eino Rastas (FIN)	15:22.2	Q
2	Katsuo Okazaki (JPN)	15:22.2	Q
3	Axel Eriksson (SWE)	15:23.6	Q
4	Léonard Mascaux (FRA)	15:26.4	Q
5	Charles Johnstone (GBR)	15:27.4	
6	Ralph Starr (GBR)		
7	Rilus Doolittle (USA)		
8	Camille Van de Velde (BEL)		
9	Alfredo Gomes (BRA)		
10	Mohamed El-Sayed (EGY)		
11	Joaquín Miquel (ESP)		
12	Vilis Cimmermans (LAT)		
13	José Eslava (MEX)		
14	Stanisław Ziffer (POL)	16:36.0	

Semifinal 2

Place	Athlete	Time	Qual.
1	Paavo Nurmi (FIN)	15:28.6	Q
2	Lucien Dolquès (FRA)	15:29.4	Q
3	Eino Seppälä (FIN)	15:34.6	Q
4	Frank Saunders (GBR)	15:37.0	Q
5	Maurice Norland (FRA)	15:41.4	
6	Harold Phelps (USA)		
7	David McGill (CAN)		
8	István Kultsár (HUN)		
9	Stefan Szelestowski (POL)		
10	Pala Singh (IND)		
11	Karel Nedobitý (TCH)		
-	William Marthé (SUI)	DNF	

Semifinal 3

Place	Athlete	Time	Qual.
1	John Romig (USA)	15:14.6	Q
2	Edvin Wide (SWE)	15:24.0	Q
3	Ville Ritola (FIN)	15:32.1	Q
4	Charles Clibbon (GBR)	15:35.6	Q
5	Lucien Duquesne (FRA)	16:03.0	
6	Jan Zeegers (NED)		
7	Alexandros Kranis (GRE)		
8	George Lermond (USA)		
9	Malcolm Boyd (AUS)		
10	Hans Kantor (AUT)		
11	Miguel Palau (ESP)		
12	Pedro Curiel (MEX)		
13	Artūrs Motmillers (LAT)		

=== Final ===
The final was held on Thursday, July 10, 1924.

Nurmi had to improve the standing Olympic record to win the gold medal with Ritola only two tenths behind.

Place	Athlete	Time
1	Paavo Nurmi (FIN)	14:31.2 OR
2	Ville Ritola (FIN)	14:31.4
3	Edvin Wide (SWE)	15:01.8
4	John Romig (USA)	15:12.4
5	Eino Seppälä (FIN)	15:18.4
6	Charles Clibbon (GBR)	15:29.0
7	Lucien Dolques (FRA)	15:32.6
8	Axel Eriksson (SWE)	15:38.0
9	Léonard Mascaux (FRA)	15:39.0
10	Frank Saunders (GBR)	15:54.0
11	Eino Rastas (FIN)	
12	Katsuo Okazaki (JPN)	

== Notes ==
- Official Report
- Wudarski, Pawel (1999). "Wyniki Igrzysk Olimpijskich" (in Polish).
