= Vyron =

Vyron or Vyronas may refer to:

- The Greek name for George Gordon Byron, 6th Baron Byron
- Vyronas, a suburb of Athens, Greece, named after Lord Byron
- Vyron (given name)
- Wang Yuhao (codenamed Vyron), an operator in Delta Force (2025 video game)
