= Mariano Aguilar =

Mexican sprinter (born 1903)

Personal information
- Full name: Mariano Ignacio Aguilar Barrera
- Born: 23 October 1903 Piedras Negras, Mexico

Sport
- Sport: Track and field
- Events: 100m, 200m
Medal record
Men's athletics
Representing Mexico
Central American and Caribbean Games
Gold medal – first place	1926 Mexico City	100 m
Gold medal – first place	1926 Mexico City	4 × 100 m relay

Mariano Ignacio Aguilar Barrera (born 23 October 1903, date of death unknown) was a Mexican sprinter. Barrera would compete at the 1924 Summer Olympics representing Mexico in two men's athletics events. He would be one of the first Mexican athletics competitors to compete at an Olympic Games as it the nation would mark its official debut in the sport at these Summer Games.

At the Summer Games, he would compete in the men's 100 metres and men's 200 metres but would not progress from the heats of either event. He would also be entered to compete in the men's 4 × 100 metres relay but did not start in the event alongside his teammates. After the Summer Games, he would compete at the 1926 Central American and Caribbean Games and would win two gold medals.

== Biography ==
Mariano Ignacio Aguilar Barrera was born on 23 October 1903 in Piedras Negras, Mexico. Barrera would compete at the 1924 Summer Olympics in Paris, France, representing Mexico in two men's athletics events. He would be one of the first Mexican athletics competitors to compete at an Olympic Games as it the nation would mark its official debut in the sport at these Summer Games.

His first event at the Summer Games would be the heats of the men's 100 metres on 6 July. There, he would compete against four other competitors in his heat and would place fourth. He would finish with a time not enough to progress and was thus eliminated from the competition. He would then compete in the heats of the men's 200 metres on 8 July. He would again compete against four other competitors in his heat and would place last. He would finish with a time not enough to progress and was thus eliminated from the competition. He would also be entered to compete in the men's 4 × 100 metres relay but did not start in the event alongside his teammates.

After the 1924 Summer Games, he would compete at the 1926 Central American and Caribbean Games held in Mexico City. There, he would win the gold medal in the men's 100 metres and won another in the men's 4 × 100 metres relay with his teammates Francisco Ramírez, Herminio Ahumada, and Mario Gómez.
