= Axel Eriksson =

Axel Eriksson may refer to:

- Axel Eriksson (athlete) (1903–1960), Swedish Olympic athlete
- Axel Eriksson (rower) (1884–1975), Swedish Olympic oarsman
- Axel Wilhelm Eriksson (1846–1901), Swedish explorer and trader in Africa
