= Jarrín =

Jarrín is a surname. Notable people with the surname include:

- Alberto Jarrín (1900–1981), Ecuadorian long-distance runner
- Jaime Jarrín (born 1933), Ecuadorian-born American sportscaster
- Jhon Jarrín (1961–2021), Ecuadorian track cyclist
- Jorge Jarrín, Ecuadorian sports broadcaster
- Luis Edgardo Mercado Jarrín (1919–2012), Peruvian politician
