= Hans Kantor =

Austrian long-distance runner

Personal information
- Nationality: Austrian
- Born: 1903

Sport
- Sport: Long-distance running
- Event: 5000 metres

Hans Kantor (born 1903, date of death unknown) was an Austrian long-distance runner. He competed in the men's 5000 metres at the 1924 Summer Olympics.
