= Anton Tsvetanov =

Bulgarian long-distance runner

Personal information
- Nationality: Bulgarian
- Born: 1880
- Died: Unknown

Sport
- Sport: Athletics
- Event: Long-distance running

Anton Tsvetanov (born 1880, date of death unknown) was a Bulgarian long-distance runner who represented Bulgaria in the 1924 Summer Olympics held in Paris. He competed in the men's 10,000 metres event.
