= Vyron (given name) =

Vyron is a given name. Notable people with the name include:

- Vyron Athanasiadis (1900–unknown), Greek long-distance runner
- Vyron Brown, American football coach
- Vyron Pallis (1923–1995), Greek actor
- Vyron Polydoras (born 1947), Greek politician
