= David Gill =

David Gill or Dave Gill may refer to:

- Dave Gill (1887–1959), Canadian ice hockey coach
- David Gill (astronomer) (1843–1914), Scottish astronomer
- David Gill (civil servant), (born 1966), German civil servant
- David Gill (football executive) (born 1957), British football executive
- David Gill (film historian) (1928–1997)
- David Macinnis Gill (born 1963), American author

== See also ==
- David McGill (disambiguation)
- David MacGill (disambiguation)
