= Harold Phelps =

American long-distance runner (1903–1991)

Personal information
- Nationality: American
- Born: May 2, 1903
- Died: September 23, 1991 (aged 88)

Sport
- Sport: Track
- Event: 5000 m
- College team: Iowa

Achievements and titles
- Olympic finals: 1924 Summer Olympics

Harold Phelps (May 2, 1903 – September 23, 1991) was an American long-distance runner. He competed in the men's 5000 metres at the 1924 Summer Olympics.
