= Léonard Mascaux =

French long-distance runner

Personal information
- Nationality: French
- Born: 19 January 1900
- Died: 25 June 1965 (aged 65)

Sport
- Sport: Long-distance running
- Event: 5000 metres

Léonard Mascaux (19 January 1900 – 25 June 1965) was a French long-distance runner. He competed in the men's 5000 metres at the 1924 Summer Olympics.
