= István Kultsár =

Hungarian long-distance runner

Personal information
- Nationality: Hungarian
- Born: 15 October 1900
- Died: 9 March 1943 (aged 42)

Sport
- Sport: Long-distance running
- Event: 5000 metres

István Kultsár (15 October 1900 – 9 March 1943) was a Hungarian long-distance runner, who was rated as one of the best Hungarian distance runners during the inter-war period. He competed in the men's 5000 metres at the 1924 Summer Olympics.

He was the national champion in the 5,000 metres in 1924, and three years later, he won the 7.5 km race. Overall, Kultsár was a six-time national champion in cross-country running during the 1920s and the 1930s. As well as competing in sport, he was a noted expert in the field and became a chief editor of Nemzeti Sport.
