= William Marthé =

Swiss long-distance runner

Personal information
- Nationality: Swiss
- Born: 1894
- Died: 1987 (aged 92–93)

Sport
- Sport: Long-distance running
- Event: 5000 metres

William Marthé (born 1894, date of death unknown) was a Swiss long-distance runner. He competed in the men's 5000 metres at the 1924 Summer Olympics.
