= Eino Rastas =

Finnish long-distance runner

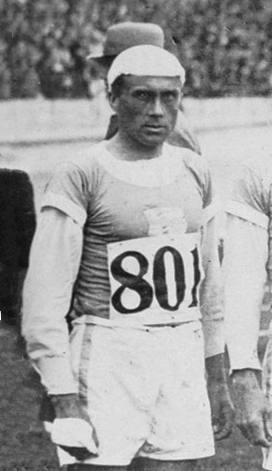
- Rastas at the 1928 Olympics

Personal information
- Born: 17 July 1894 Valkeala, Finland
- Died: 7 January 1965 (aged 69) Kuusankoski, Finland
- Height: 170 cm (5 ft 7 in)
- Weight: 57 kg (126 lb)

Sport
- Sport: Athletics
- Events: 5000 m, 10,000 m, marathon
- Club: Valkealan Roima; Selänpään Jäykät

Achievements and titles
- Personal bests: 5000 m – 15:00.6 (1926); 10,000 m – 31:42.7 (1923); Marathon – 2:40:40 (1928)

Eino Rastas (17 July 1894 – 7 January 1965) was a Finnish long-distance runner. Rastas was a three-time Finnish champion and competed in the Summer Olympics in 1920, 1924 and 1928; in 1920 and 1924 he was part of Finland's gold medal-winning cross-country teams, though his results did not count for the team total in either case.

== Career ==
Rastas won his first medals at the Finnish national championships in 1917, winning gold in the 10,000 metres and silver at 5000 metres. At the 1920 Summer Olympics in Antwerp he represented Finland in the cross-country race, placing 18th; the race doubled as a team event, which Finland won, but only the results of the best three finishers (Paavo Nurmi, Heikki Liimatainen and Teodor Koskenniemi) counted for the team result.

At the 1924 Olympics in Paris, Rastas represented Finland in both the 5000 m and the cross-country race, the latter again doubling as a team competition. The 5000 m was held first; Rastas won his heat and placed 11th in the final. The conditions for the cross-country race were extremely hot and demanding, and the majority of runners failed to finish; this included Rastas, who dropped out shortly after the halfway point. Two other Finns (Väinö Sipilä and Eero Berg) also dropped out, but Finland still won the team race again.

Rastas made a third and final Olympic appearance in 1928, this time in the marathon; he placed fourteenth. In total, Rastas won 10 medals at the Finnish championships, including three gold medals; in addition to his 10,000 m gold from 1917, he won both the 5000 m and 10,000 m in 1922.

Rastas worked as a senior conductor at the Finnish railways.
