= Rilus Doolittle =

American long-distance runner

Personal information
- Nationality: American
- Born: April 15, 1900
- Died: February 11, 1983 (aged 82)

Sport
- Sport: Long-distance running
- Event: 5000 metres

Rilus Doolittle (April 15, 1900 – February 11, 1983) was an American long-distance runner. He competed in the men's 5000 metres at the 1924 Summer Olympics.

Doolittle competed for the Butler Bulldogs track and field team in the NCAA.
