= Vasil Venkov =

Bulgarian long-distance runner

Personal information
- Nationality: Bulgarian
- Born: 1903
- Died: 1975 (aged 71–72)

Sport
- Sport: Long-distance running
- Event: 10,000 metres

Vasil Venkov (1903 – 1975) was a Bulgarian long-distance runner. He competed in the men's 10,000 metres at the 1924 Summer Olympics.
