= Alfonso Stoopen =

Mexican athlete

Medal record

Men's athletics

Representing Mexico

Central American and Caribbean Games
Gold medal – first place	1926 Mexico City	High jump

Alfonso Stoopen (4 March 1902 – 22 December 1967) was a Mexican high jumper and long jumper who competed in the 1924 Summer Olympics. He was born in San Luis Potosí.
