= Francisco Contreras (athlete) =

Mexican hurdler

Personal information
- Nationality: Mexican
- Born: 24 May 1904
- Died: 17 March 1949 (aged 44)

Sport
- Sport: Track and field
- Event: 110 metres hurdles

Francisco Contreras (24 May 1904 – 17 March 1949) was a Mexican hurdler. He competed in the men's 110 metres hurdles at the 1924 Summer Olympics.
