= Manuel Solis (sport shooter) =

Mexican sports shooter

Personal information
- Born: 24 December 1889
- Died: 2 January 1984 (aged 94)

Sport
- Sport: Sports shooting

Manuel Solis (24 December 1889 – 2 January 1984) was a Mexican sports shooter. He competed in two events at the 1924 Summer Olympics.
