= Frank Saunders (athlete) =

British long-distance runner

Personal information
- Nationality: British
- Born: 15 June 1899
- Died: December 1992

Sport
- Sport: Long-distance running
- Event: 5000 metres

Frank Saunders (15 June 1899 – December 1992) was a British long-distance runner. He competed in the men's 5000 metres at the 1924 Summer Olympics.
