= Fabián Velasco =

Spanish athletics competitor

Personal information
- Nationality: Spanish
- Born: 20 January 1902 Castro Urdiales, Spain
- Died: 3 February 1953 (aged 51)

Sport
- Sport: Athletics
- Event: Long-distance running

Fabián Velasco (20 January 1902 – 3 February 1953) was a Spanish athlete. He competed in the men's individual cross country event at the 1924 Summer Olympics.
