= Arthur Sewell (athlete) =

British athlete

Personal information
- Nationality: British
- Born: 21 December 1903 Bramley, England
- Died: 9 February 1984 (aged 80) Winchester, England

Sport
- Sport: Athletics
- Event: Long-distance running

Arthur Sewell (21 December 1903 – 9 February 1984) was a British athlete. He competed in the men's individual cross country event at the 1924 Summer Olympics.
