= Juan Escutia (athlete) =

Mexican sprinter

Personal information
- Born: Juan Escutia Olivares; 15 December 1895 Coatepec de Morelos, Mexico
- Died: 5 October 1933 (aged 37) El Dorado, Mexico

Sport
- Sport: Sprinting
- Event: 400 metres

Juan Escutia Olivares (15 December 1895 – 5 October 1933) was a Mexican sprinter. He competed in the men's 400 metres at the 1924 Summer Olympics. He was killed after being hit by a train in 1933.
