= André Lauseig =

French long-distance runner

Personal information
- Nationality: French
- Born: 8 January 1900 Blaye, France
- Died: 3 December 1972 (aged 72) Bruges, France

Sport
- Sport: Athletics
- Event: Long-distance running

André Lauseig (8 January 1900 – 3 December 1972) was a French athlete. He competed in the men's individual cross country event at the 1924 Summer Olympics.
