= David McGill (athlete) =

Canadian long-distance runner

Personal information
- Full name: David Earl McGill
- Born: October 25, 1901 Victoria, Manitoba, Canada
- Died: September 6, 1981 (aged 79) New Westminster, British Columbia, Canada

Sport
- Country: Canada
- Sport: 5000 metres

Achievements and titles
- Olympic finals: 1924, 7th place

David Earl McGill (October 25, 1901 – September 6, 1981) was a Canadian athlete who competed in the 5000 metres at the 1924 Summer Olympics.
