= Julio Domínguez (runner) =

Spanish athlete

Personal information
- Nationality: Spanish
- Born: 19 January 1898 Madrid, Spain
- Died: 11 October 1957 (aged 59)

Sport
- Sport: Athletics
- Event: Long-distance running

Julio Domínguez (19 January 1898 – 11 October 1957) was a Spanish athlete. He competed in the men's individual cross country event at the 1920 Summer Olympics.
