= Camiel Van de Velde =

Belgian long-distance runner (1903–1985)

Personal information
- Nationality: Belgian
- Born: 4 February 1903 Kruibeke, Belgium
- Died: 26 July 1985 (aged 82) Kruibeke, Belgium

Sport
- Sport: Long-distance running
- Event: 5000 metres

Camiel Van de Velde (4 February 1903 – 26 July 1985) was a Belgian long-distance runner. He competed in the men's 5000 metres at the 1924 Summer Olympics.
