= Antonio Amorós =

Spanish athlete

Personal information
- Full name: Antonio Amorós López
- Nickname: El Galgo de Caudete
- Born: 9 January 1927 Caudete, Spain
- Died: 3 August 2004 (aged 77) Yecla, Spain
- Years active: 1948–1960

Sport
- Sport: Long-distance running
- Team: RCD Espanyol

Antonio Amorós López (9 January 1927 – 3 August 2004) was a Spanish athlete who specialized in long-distance events and cross country running.

== Early life ==
Antonio Amorós was born in Caudete, Albacete, on 9 January 1927, to local farmers who owned vineyards and land on which they lived. When the Spanish Civil War broke out in 1936, the 9-year-old Amorós had to leave school to help his father with the farm work.

== Career ==
When the War ended, Amorós joined Centuria Pedro Gil, where he practiced swimming, cycling, and football, standing out in the latter, where he played as a midfielder. However, football ended up not working out for him, so he continued with his parents' vineyards and orchard until 1948, when he was asked to take part in a 7-kilometre foot race to form a team to represent Albacete in the Spanish Championships of the Youth Front, which he won, thus going to the Championship, where he finished in seventh place. In the 1949 Spanish Championship, held at the Montjuïc Stadium, he had a very strong start, but got tired halfway through the race and ultimately abandoned the race.

After winning the Grand Prix of the Frente de Juventudes, Amorós began to receive offers to participate in various races around Spain, becoming a highly valued runner sought after by the big clubs, but in the end, he signed for the athletics section of Real Madrid, which, in addition to money, offered him an orderly position at the Banco Mercantil y Industrial, where he had to be on his feet for a long time, which affected his athletic life and resulted in a knee injury, so he left Madrid in 1951.

Amorós then joined the athletics section of RCD Espanyol, where he spent most of his sporting career, with many people believing that he was Catalan due to both his surname and the fact that he spent most of his sports career in Catalonia. Together with Gregorio Rojo and Constantino Miranda, he was a member of the pro-Civil War generation that was raised amidst hardships and thus molded by them for long-distance events. At one point, he managed to hold all three Spanish records in long-distance running at the same time (3,000, 5,000, and 10,000 meters), becoming the first Spanish citizen to break the half-hour barrier in the latter.

In addition to long-distance running, Amorós also excelled in cross-country running, especially on muddy circuits, which are now nearly extinct; for instance, in the 1961 edition of the Cross of Nations, held in Nantes, the 34-year-old Amorós achieved a surprising second place on a completely muddy circuit.

== Honours ==
- Former Spanish record holder in the 3000, 5000, and 10000 meters
- Spanish 5000-meter champion: 1953, 1954, 1955, 1956
- Spanish 10,000-meter sprint champion: 1953, 1954, 1955, 1956
- Spanish Cross Country Champion: 1954, 1955, 1957, 1958, 1961
- Spanish runner-up in the 10,000-meter dash: 1951, 1958.
- Catalan Cross Country Championship: 1954, 1955, 1957, 1958, 1961
- Catalan 5000-meter champion: 1954, 1955, 1956
- Catalan 10,000-meter sprint champion: 1954, 1956, 1957

== International awards ==
- 70 times international
- Runner-up in the cross-country world.
- 8th at the 1958 Stockholm European Championships in the 10,000-meter race.
