= John Benham (athlete) =

British long-distance runner

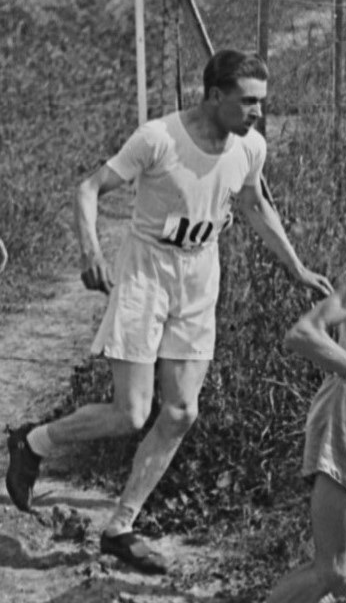

Personal information
- Nationality: British (English)
- Born: 26 June 1900 Deptford, London, England
- Died: 10 January 1990 (aged 89) Vancouver, Canada

Sport
- Sport: Athletics
- Event: Long-distance running
- Club: Surrey AC

John Cecil Benham (26 June 1900 – 10 January 1990) was a British athlete who competed at the 1924 Summer Olympics.

== Biography ==
Benham was born in Deptford, London, the son of a London printer. He was a member of the Surrey Athletic Club.

In 1923, he won the Surrey 4-mile and 7-mile titles and the following year retained his 4-mile title and finished 13th at the International Cross-Country Championship. He represented Great Britain at the 1924 Summer Olympics in Paris, competing in both the individual cross country and team cross country.
