= Joseph Williams (athlete) =

British cross-country runner

Personal information
- Nationality: British
- Born: 1897

Sport
- Sport: Athletics
- Event: Long-distance running

Joseph Williams (born 1897, date of death unknown) was a British athlete. He competed in the men's individual cross country event at the 1924 Summer Olympics.
