= Guillermo Amparan =

Mexican sprinter (1905–1984)

Personal information
- Born: 19 April 1905 Gómez Palacio, Durango, Mexico
- Died: 29 March 1984 (aged 78) Tlalpan, Mexico City, Mexico

Sport
- Sport: Sprinting
- Event: 400 metres

Guillermo Amparan (19 April 1905 – 29 March 1984) was a Mexican sprinter. He competed in the men's 400 metres at the 1924 Summer Olympics.
