= Henri Lauvaux =

French long-distance runner

Olympic medal record

Men's athletics

Representing France
| Bronze medal – third place | 1924 Paris | Cross country team |

Gustave Henri Lauvaux (French pronunciation: [ɡystav ɑ̃ʁi lovo]; 9 October 1900 – 19 July 1970) was a French distance runner who competed mainly in the Cross Country Team event. He competed with the French Cross Country Team in the 1924 Summer Olympics held in Paris, France, where he and his teammates Gaston Heuet and Maurice Norland won the bronze medal.
