= Gaston Heuet =

French long-distance runner (1892–1979)

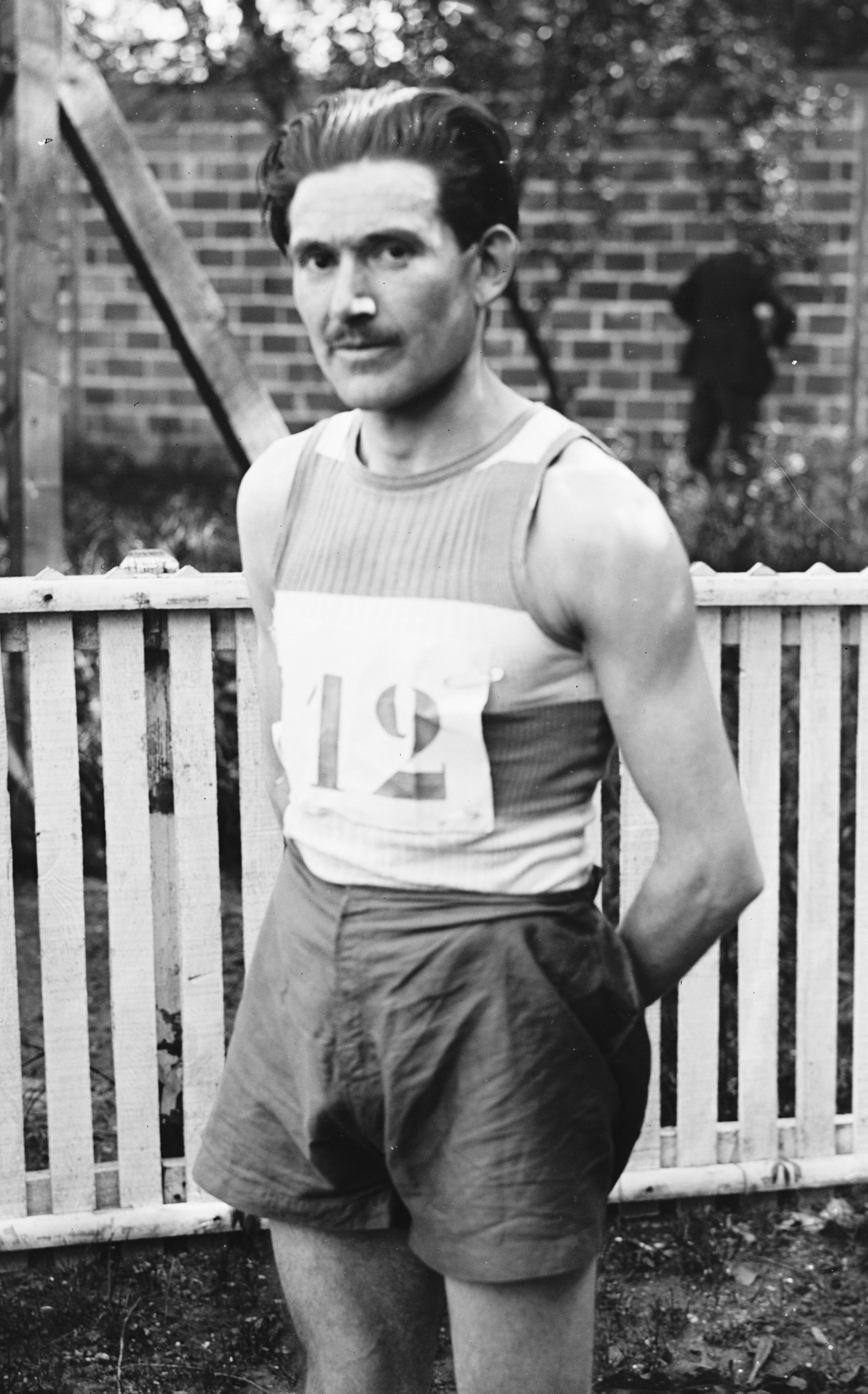
- Gaston Heuet in 1922

Personal information
- Born: 11 November 1892 Buenos Aires, Argentina
- Died: 18 January 1979 (aged 86) Grandvilliers, Oise, France
- Height: 1.60 m (5 ft 3 in)
- Weight: 49 kg (108 lb)

Sport
- Sport: Athletics
- Event: 1500–10,000 m
- Club: Métropolitain Club Colombes; VC Beauvais

Achievements and titles
- Personal best(s): 1500 m – 4:08.0 (1919); 5000 m – 15:23.2 (1922); 10,000 m – 32:11.1 (1920)
Medal record
Representing France
Olympic Games
Bronze medal – third place	1924 Paris	Cross country team

Gaston Heuet (11 November 1892 – 18 January 1979) was a French long-distance runner, who competed at the Olympic Games.

== Career ==
Heuet finished third behind Joe Blewitt in the 4 miles event at the British 1920 AAA Championships.

Heuet won a bronze medal at the 1924 Paris Olympics in the cross country team event, together with Henri Lauvaux and Maurice Norland. He won another cross-country bronze medal at the 1919 Inter-Allied Games.
