= Harry Frieda =

American decathlete

Personal information
- Nationality: American
- Born: September 11, 1901 Chalmers, Indiana, United States
- Died: August 20, 1983 (aged 81) Park Ridge, Illinois, United States

Sport
- Sport: Athletics
- Event: Decathlon

Harry Frieda (September 11, 1901 – August 20, 1983) was an American athlete. He competed in the men's decathlon at the 1924 Summer Olympics.

Frieda was also an accomplished javelin thrower individually, and he won the 1923 NCAA DI javelin championships for the Chicago Maroons track and field team.
