= Axel Eriksson (athlete) =

Swedish long-distance runner (1903–1960)

Personal information
- Nationality: Swedish
- Born: 14 April 1903
- Died: 26 February 1960 (aged 56)

Sport
- Sport: Long-distance running
- Event: 5000 metres

Axel Eriksson (14 April 1903 – 26 February 1960) was a Swedish long-distance runner. He competed in the men's 5000 metres at the 1924 Summer Olympics.
