= Daniel Eslava =

Mexican athlete

Personal information
- Nationality: Mexican
- Born: 1902

Sport
- Sport: Middle-distance running and racewalking
- Event: 1500 metres

Daniel Eslava (born 1902, date of death unknown) was a Mexican middle-distance runner and racewalker. He competed in the men's 1500 metres, men's 5000 metres and men's 10 kilometres walk at the 1924 Summer Olympics.
