= Guillaume Tell (athlete) =

French long-distance runner

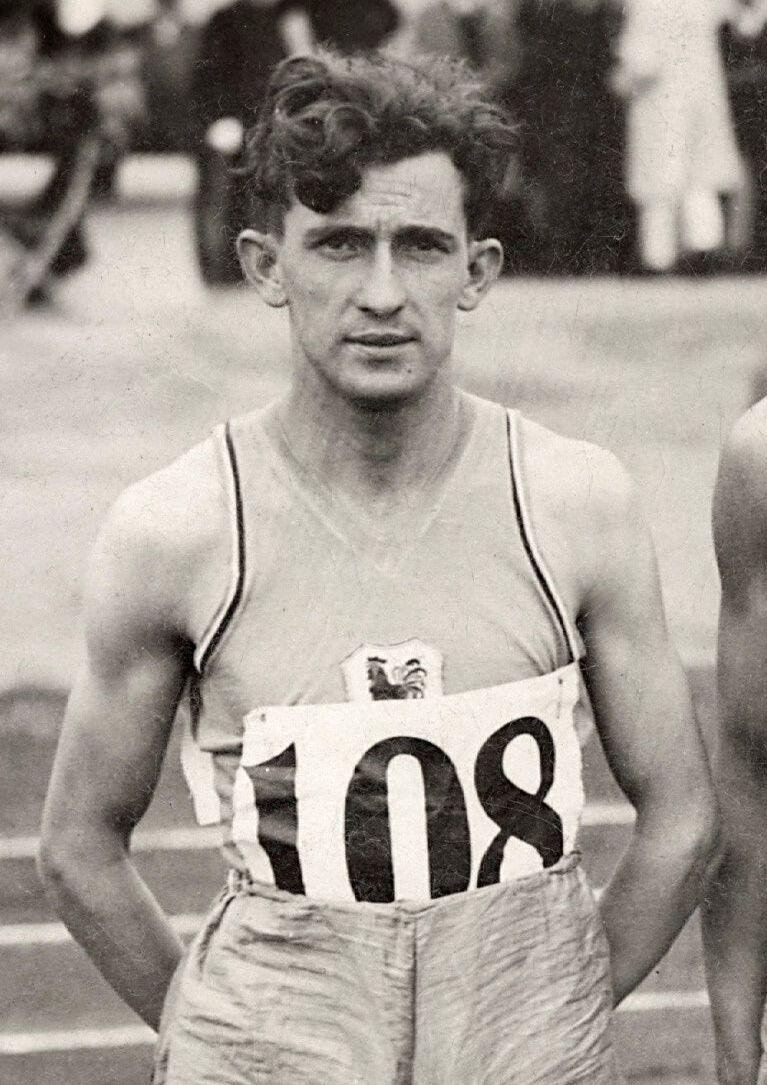
- Tell at the 1928 Olympic marathon

Personal information
- Nationality: French
- Born: 8 July 1902 Spain
- Died: 6 October 1998 (aged 96)

Sport
- Sport: Long-distance running
- Event: Marathon

Guillaume Tell (8 July 1902 – 6 October 1998) was a French long-distance runner. He competed at the 1924 Summer Olympics and the 1928 Summer Olympics.
