= Arthur Studenroth =

American long-distance runner

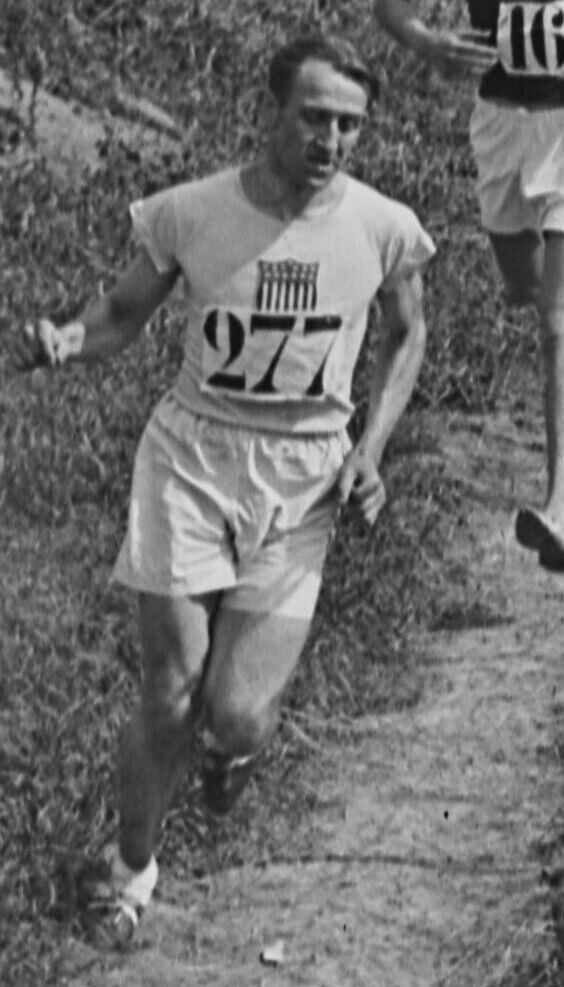

Medal record

Men's athletics

Representing the United States
Silver medal – second place	1924 Paris	Team cross country

Arthur Addison Studenroth (October 9, 1899 – March 14, 1992) was an American athlete who competed mainly in the Cross Country Team. He competed for the United States in the 1924 Summer Olympics held in Paris, France in the Cross Country Team where he won the silver medal with his teammates Earl Johnson and August Fager.

== See also ==
- List of Pennsylvania State University Olympians
