= Vyron Athanasiadis =

Greek long-distance runner

Personal information
- Nationality: Greek
- Born: 1900

Sport
- Sport: Long-distance running
- Events: Marathon, 10,000m

Vyron Athanasiadis (born 1900, date of death unknown) was a Greek long-distance runner. He competed in the 10,000 metres and the marathon at the 1924 Summer Olympics.
