= Earl Johnson (runner) =

American athletics competitor

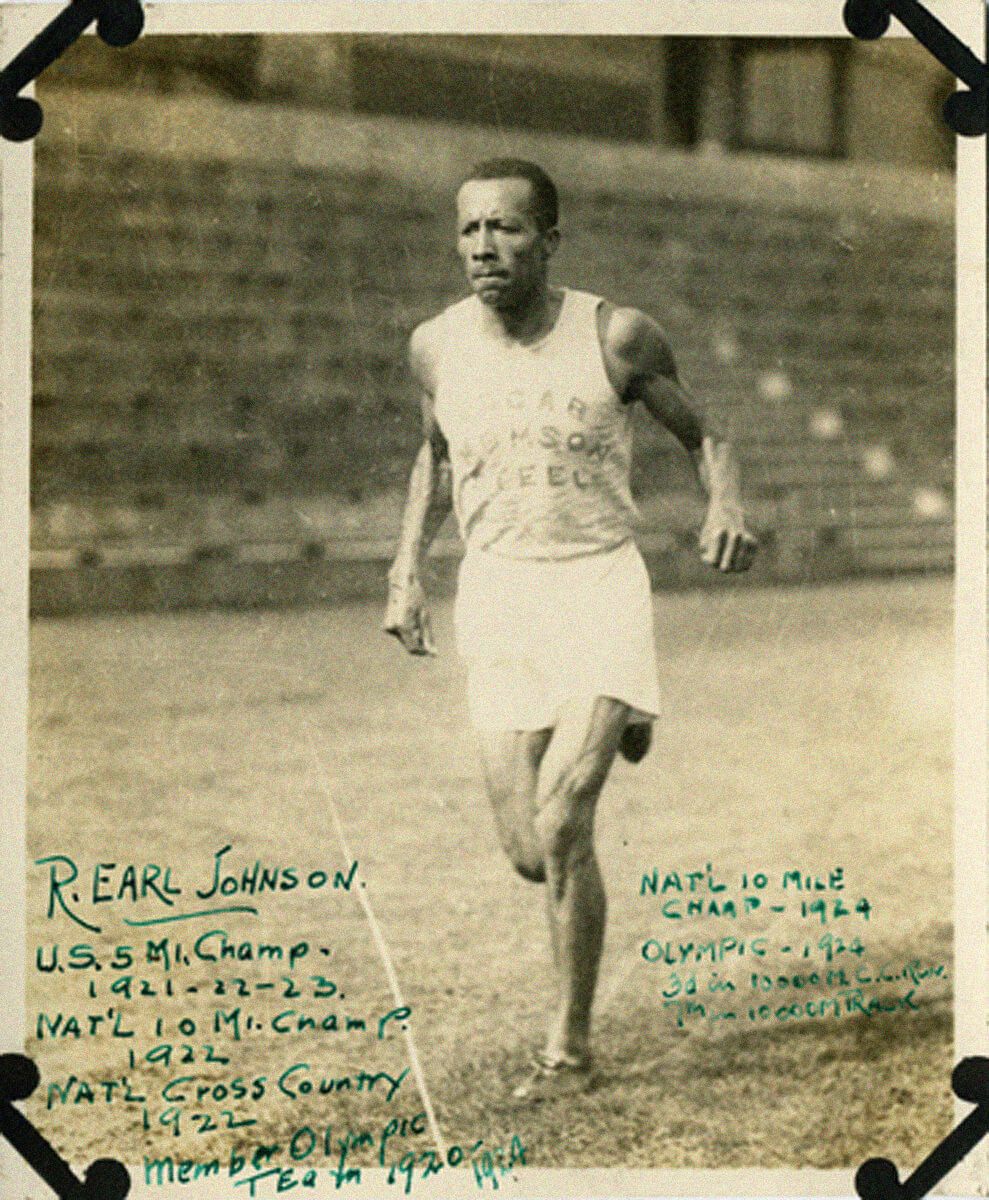
Medal record
Olympic medal record
Men's athletics
Representing the United States
Silver medal – second place	1924 Paris	Team cross country
Bronze medal – third place	1924 Paris	Individual cross country

Robert Earle "Earl" Johnson (March 10, 1891 in Woodstock, Virginia – November 19, 1965) was an American athlete who competed mainly in the cross country team.

== Achievements ==
He was the 1921 National Champion. He effectively defended his championship in 1922 as he was beaten by Ville Ritola's Van Cortlandt Park course record, but since Ritola was Finnish, Johnson was the first American finisher in the National Championships. A rare black athlete of his day, he worked for the Edgar Thomson Steel Works in Pittsburgh, Pennsylvania.

== Award ==
He competed for the United States in the 1924 Summer Olympics held in Paris, France in the cross-country team where he won the silver medal with his teammates Arthur Studenroth and August Fager. In the 10,000 m at the 1924 Summer Olympics, Johnson finished 8th in 32:17.0.

== Personal life ==
Johnson was an adopted child; his aunt and uncle, Mary and Robert, adopted him and raised him in their Harrisonburg, VA. home. As a child, he participated in numerous sports.

== Death ==
Later in life, he got a job as a sportswriter for The Pittsburgh Courier. He died at the Pittsburgh VA Hospital aged 74.
