= Jesús Diéguez =

Spanish long-distance runner

Personal information
- Nationality: Spanish
- Born: 5 July 1902 Barcelona, Spain
- Died: 1989 (aged 86–87)

Sport
- Sport: Athletics
- Event: Long-distance running

Jesús Diéguez (5 July 1902 – 1989) was a Spanish athlete. He competed in the men's individual cross country event at the 1924 Summer Olympics.
