= August Fager =

American long-distance runner

August Oliver Fager (Fagerström)
- Born: December 25, 1891; Perniö, Varsinais-Suomi, Finland
- Died: November 17, 1967 (aged 75); Lake Worth, Florida, United States
- Other name: Gus
- Years active: 1924
- Known for: Silver medalist in 1924 Olympic Games

Olympic medal record

Men's athletics

Representing the United States
Silver medal – second place	1924 Paris	Cross country team

August Oliver Fager (December 25, 1891 – November 17, 1967) was an American athlete who competed mainly in long-distance races. Born in Finland, he competed for the United States in the 1924 Summer Olympics held in Paris, France on the Cross Country Team, where he won the silver medal with his teammates Earl Johnson and Arthur Studenroth. He died in Lake Worth, Florida in 1967.
