= José Martínez (sprinter) =

Mexican sprinter

Personal information
- Full name: José N. Martínez Garza
- Nationality: Mexican
- Born: 17 December 1901 Chihuahua

Sport
- Sport: Sprinting
- Event: 200 metres

José N. Martínez Garza (born 17 December 1901, date of death unknown) was a Mexican sprinter. He competed in the men's 200 metres at the 1924 Summer Olympics.
