= Herminio Ahumada =

Mexican athlete

Personal information
- Born: 7 October 1899 Soyopa, Sonora, Mexico
- Died: 1 July 1983 (aged 83) Mexico City, Mexico

Sport
- Sport: Track and field
- Event(s): 100m, 200m

Herminio Ahumada (7 October 1899 – 1 July 1983) was a Mexican politician and sprinter who competed in the 1924 Summer Olympics. In the 1943 mid-terms he was elected to the Chamber of Deputies to represent the second district of Sonora for the Party of the Mexican Revolution (PRM) during the 39th session of Congress, where he was the President of the Chamber of Deputies in 1944.

After earning a law degree from the National Autonomous University of Mexico, Ahumada worked as a judge in Sonora Superior Tribunals of Justice in Sonora and the Federal District.

== Personal life ==
Ahumada married Carmen Vasconcelos, daughter of José Vasconcelos. Their son, Felipe Ahumada Vasconcelos, married Celia Castillo Peraza, sister of Carlos Castillo Peraza.
