= Sven Thuresson =

Swedish long-distance runner

Personal information
- Full name: Sven Eugen Thuresson
- Nationality: Swedish
- Born: 5 November 1900
- Died: 9 February 1982 (aged 81)

Sport
- Sport: Long-distance running
- Event: 10,000 metres

Sven Eugen Thuresson (5 November 1900 – 9 February 1982) was a Swedish long-distance runner. He competed in the men's 10,000 metres at the 1924 Summer Olympics.
