= Eino Seppälä =

Finnish middle-distance runner

Eino Seppälä (11 November 1896 – 4 April 1968) was a Finnish track and field athlete. He was born in Virolahti. He competed in the 3000 metres team race at the 1924 Summer Olympics, where the Finnish team won gold medals. He also competed in the 5,000 metre, where he placed fifth.

Eino Seppälä’s great granddaughter is Finnish tennis player Saana Saarteinen.
