= Pedro Curiel =

Mexican athlete

Personal information
- Nationality: Mexican
- Born: 1902

Sport
- Sport: Long-distance running
- Event: 5000 metres

Pedro Curiel (born 1902, date of death unknown) was a Mexican long-distance runner. He competed in the men's 5000 metres at the 1924 Summer Olympics.
