= José Andía =

Spanish long-distance runner

Personal information
- Nationality: Spanish
- Born: 26 March 1898 Madrid, Spain

Sport
- Sport: Athletics
- Event: Long-distance running

José Andía (born 26 March 1898, date of death unknown) was a Spanish athlete. He competed in the men's individual cross country event at the 1924 Summer Olympics.
