= Miguel Peña (runner) =

Spanish athlete (born 1897)

Personal information
- Nationality: Spanish
- Born: 12 March 1897 Bilbao, Spain

Sport
- Sport: Athletics
- Event: Long-distance running

Miguel Peña (born 12 March 1897, date of death unknown) was a Spanish athlete. He competed in the men's individual cross country event at the 1924 Summer Olympics.
