= John Gray (runner, born 1894) =

American long-distance runner

Personal information
- Full name: John Joseph Gray
- Nationality: American
- Born: December 24, 1894
- Died: June 12, 1942 (aged 47)

Sport
- Sport: Long-distance running
- Event: 10,000 metres

John Joseph Gray (December 24, 1894 – June 12, 1942) was an American long-distance runner. He competed in the men's 10,000 metres at the 1924 Summer Olympics.
