= Amador Palma =

Spanish athlete

Personal information
- Nationality: Spanish
- Born: 14 August 1902 Sestao, Spain
- Died: 28 May 1958 (aged 55)

Sport
- Sport: Athletics
- Event: Long-distance running

Amador Palma (14 August 1902 – 28 May 1958) was a Spanish athlete. He competed in the men's individual cross country event at the 1924 Summer Olympics.
