= Eddie Webster =

British athlete

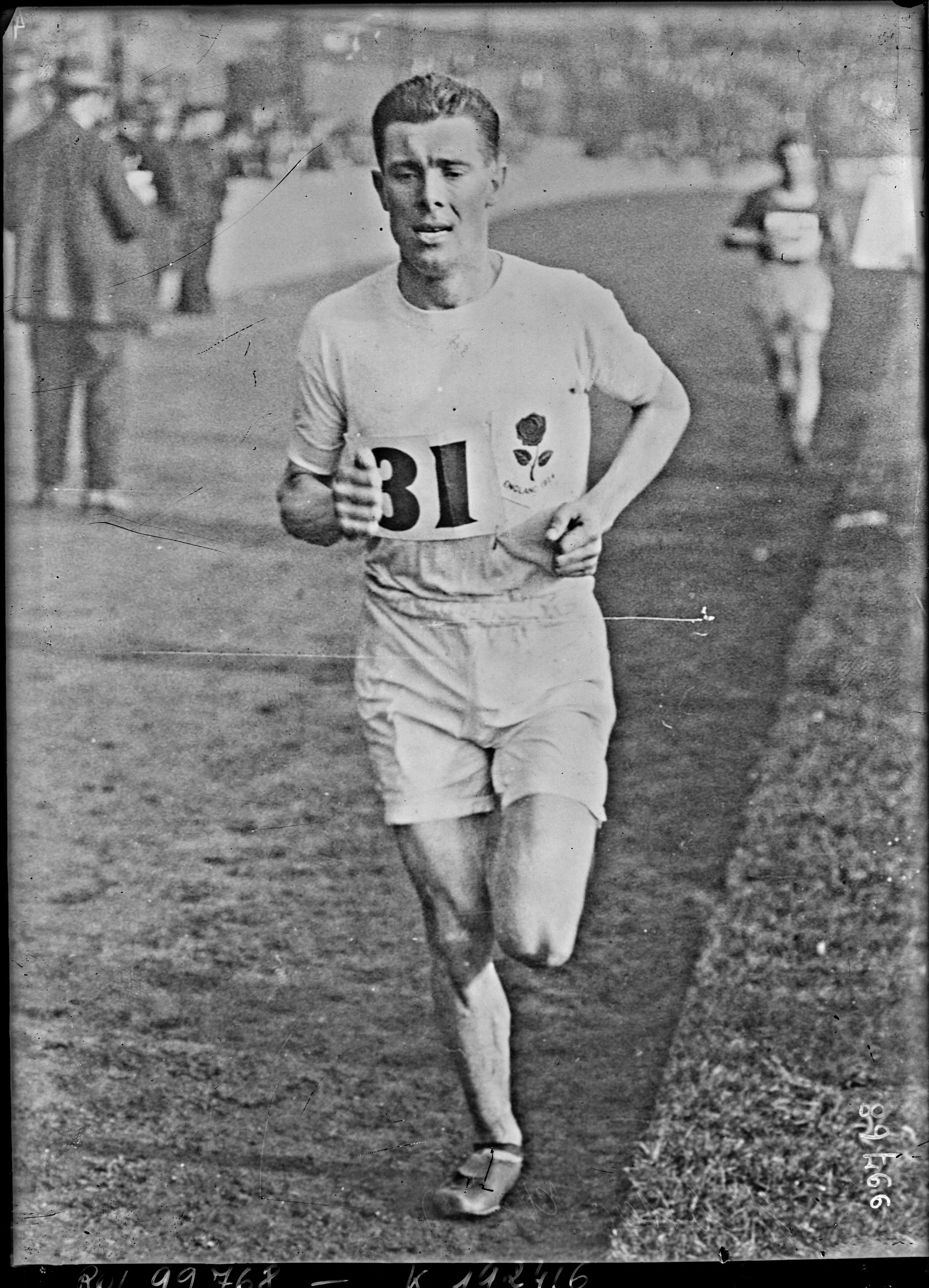

Personal information
- Full name: Joseph Edward Webster
- Nationality: British (English)
- Born: 15 June 1902 Rowley Regis, England
- Died: 22 August 1945 (aged 43) Italy
- Height: 170 cm (5 ft 7 in)
- Weight: 63 kg (139 lb)

Sport
- Sport: Long-distance running
- Event: 10,000 metres/steeplechase
- Club: Birchfield Harriers

Joseph Edward Webster also known by the name Jack Webster (15 June 1902 − 22 August 1945) was a British long-distance runner who competed at the 1924 Summer Olympics. He was killed in a military vehicle accident during World War II.

== Biography ==
Webster competed in the men's 10,000 metres at the 1924 Olympics Games.

The following year, Webster became the national 10 miles champion and the national steeplechase champion after winning the British AAA Championships title at the 1925 AAA Championships. He then retained his steeplechase title and also became the national 4 miles champion at the 1926 AAA Championships.

Webster won a third and fourth successive steeplechase title in 1927 and 1928 in addition to regaining the 10 miles title at the 1928 AAA Championships.

Despite being one of the leading British athletes at the time he was surprisingly left out of the British team for the 1928 Summer Olympics due to a technical difficulty. It transpired that Webster had been paid for the a photograph of him in a publication, which the AAA deemed as affecting his amateur status.

Webster served as a gunner in the Royal Artillery during the Second World War and was killed in a road accident in Italy on 21 August 1945, a month before he was to be demobilised. He is buried at Salerno War Cemetery.
