= Gösta Bergström =

Swedish long-distance runner

Personal information
- Full name: Gustaf Valfrid Teodor Gösta Bergström
- Nationality: Swedish
- Born: 6 August 1903
- Died: 10 October 1988 (aged 85)

Sport
- Sport: Long-distance running
- Event: 10,000 metres

Gustaf Valfrid Teodor Gösta Bergström (6 August 1903 – 10 October 1988) was a Swedish long-distance runner. He competed in the men's 10,000 metres and cross country running at the 1924 Summer Olympics.
