= Lucien Dolquès =

French long-distance runner

Personal information
- Nationality: French
- Born: 27 February 1905
- Died: 17 July 1977 (aged 72)

Sport
- Sport: Long-distance running
- Event: 5000 metres

Lucien Dolquès (27 February 1905 – 17 July 1977) was a French long-distance runner. He competed in the men's 5000 metres at the 1924 Summer Olympics.
