= Sidon Ebeling =

Swedish long-distance runner

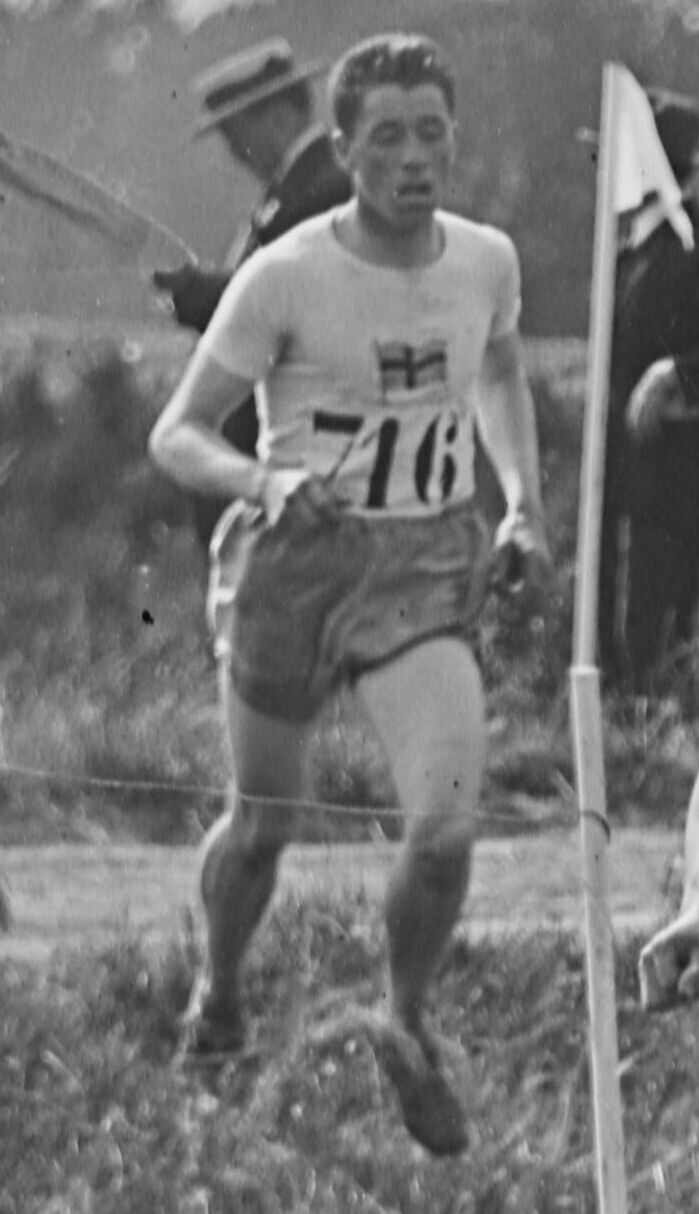
- Sidon Ebeling in 1924

Personal information
- Full name: Sidon Valfrid Ebeling
- Nationality: Swedish
- Born: 4 December 1900
- Died: 16 January 1994 (aged 93)

Sport
- Sport: Long-distance running
- Event: 10,000 metres

Sidon Valfrid Ebeling (4 December 1900 – 16 January 1994) was a Swedish long-distance runner. He competed in the men's 10,000 metres at the 1924 Summer Olympics.
