= Verne Booth =

American long-distance runner

Personal information
- Full name: Verne Hobson Booth
- Nationality: American
- Born: October 27, 1898 Sawyer, North Dakota, U.S.
- Died: September 27, 1979 (aged 80) Hendersonville, North Carolina, U.S.

Sport
- Sport: Long-distance running
- Event: 10,000 metres

Verne Hobson Booth (October 27, 1898 – September 27, 1979) was an American long-distance runner. He competed in the men's 10,000 metres at the 1924 Summer Olympics.

== Early life ==
Booth was born in Swayer, North Dakota, to John Francis Booth and Mary Ann Booth (nee Wilson). He was raised on a farm.

After high school graduation, Booth joined the Signal Corps and served in World War I.

== College ==
After the war, Booth attended the University of Delaware and competed on the track and field team.

He transferred to Johns Hopkins University and ran for the Blue Jays track and field team. He won the 1923 I.C.A.A.A.A. Cross-Country Championship and the 1923 NCAA Track and Field Championships in the two miles.

In 1924, he received his Bachelor's of Arts degree in geology from Johns Hopkins.

== Career ==
After college, Booth joined the geology faculty at Brooklyn College. He wrote several text books, including The Structure of Atoms (1964), The Nature of Matter and Energy (1970), Elements of Physical Science (1971), and A Study of Matter and Energy (1972).

== Personal ==
Booth married Katherine Brevoort Allen in 1928.

He died on September 27, 1979, in Hendersonville, North Carolina, United States.

== Legacy ==
In 1995, Booth was inducted into the Johns Hopkins Athletic Hall of Fame.
