= James Henigan =

American long-distance runner

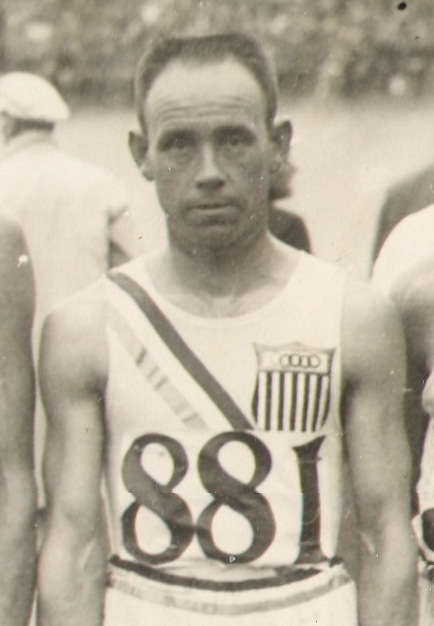

Personal information
- Born: April 25, 1892 Boston, Massachusetts, U.S.
- Died: February 27, 1950 (aged 57) Chesterfield, South Carolina, U.S.

Sport
- Sport: Long-distance running
- Event: Marathon

James Henigan (April 25, 1892 – February 27, 1950) was an American long-distance runner. He competed at the 1924, 1928 and the 1932 Summer Olympics. He also won the Boston Marathon in 1931.
