= Miguel Palau =

Spanish long-distance runner

Personal information
- Nationality: Spanish
- Born: 18 June 1901
- Died: 9 March 1987 (aged 85)

Sport
- Sport: Long-distance running
- Event: 5000 metres

Miguel Palau (18 June 1901 – 9 March 1987) was a Spanish long-distance runner. He competed in the men's 5000 metres at the 1924 Summer Olympics.
