= Eero Berg =

Finnish long-distance runner

Personal information
- Full name: Eero Edvin Berg
- Nationality: Finnish
- Born: 17 February 1898 Kangasala
- Died: 14 July 1969 (aged 71) Karijoki
- Height: 1.67 m (5 ft 6 in)
- Weight: 58 kg (128 lb)

Sport
- Sport: Running
- Event: 10,000 metres
Medal record
Olympic Games
Gold medal – first place	1924 Paris	Men's team cross country
Bronze medal – third place	1924 Paris	10,000 metres

Eero Berg (17 February 1898, Kangasala – 14 July 1969) was a Finnish athlete who mainly competed in the 10,000 metres during his career. He competed for Finland at the 1924 Summer Olympics held in Paris, France where he won the bronze medal in the men's 10,000 metres competition and gold in Men's Cross-Country, Team.
