= Ville Ritola =

Finnish long-distance runner (1896–1982)

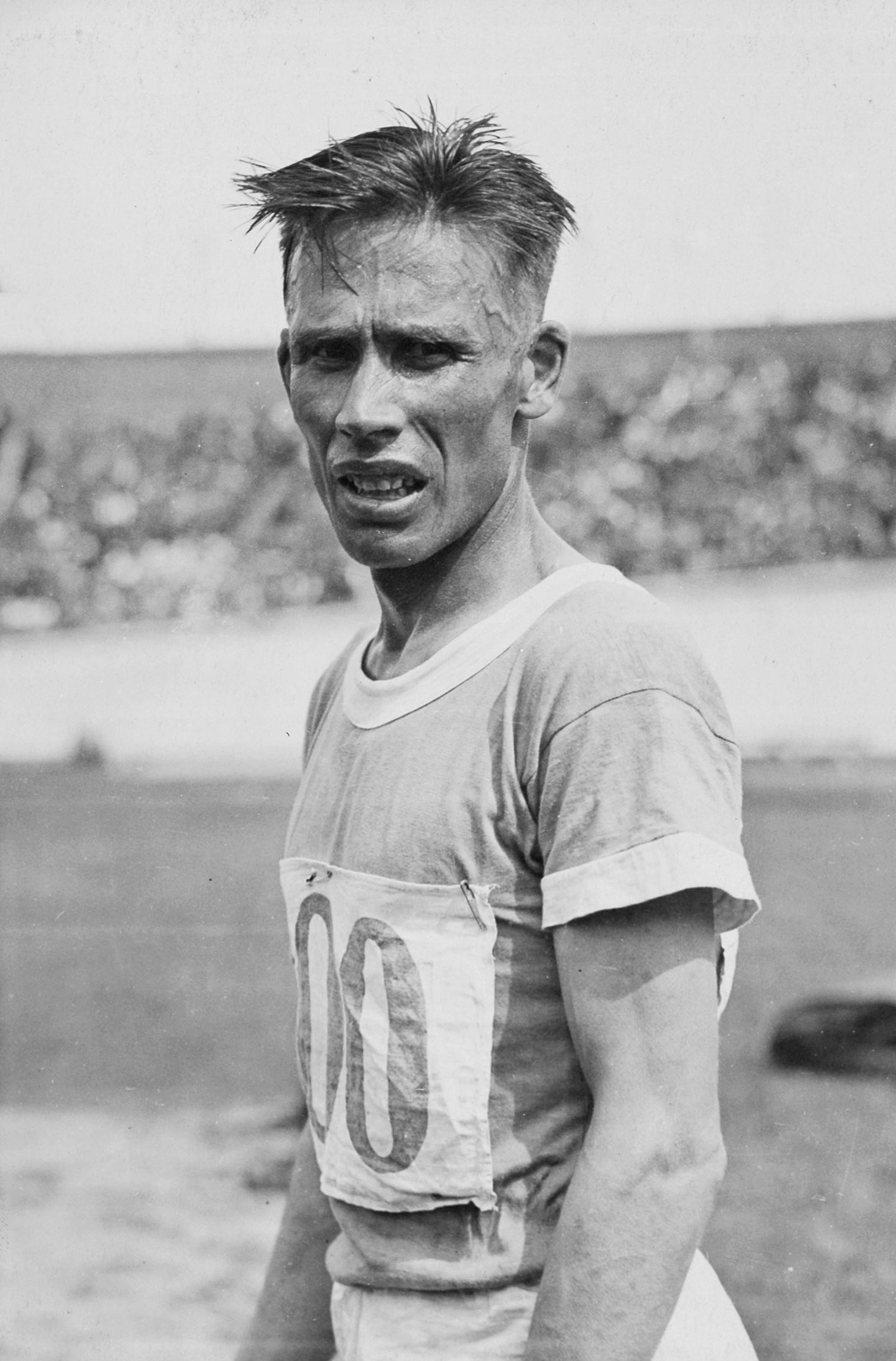
- Ville Ritola at the 1928 Olympics

Personal information
- Full name: Vilho Eino Ritola
- Born: 18 January 1896 Peräseinäjoki, Grand Duchy of Finland, Russian Empire
- Died: 24 April 1982 (aged 86) Helsinki, Finland
- Height: 1.75 m (5 ft 9 in)
- Weight: 66 kg (146 lb)

Sport
- Sport: Running
- Club: Tampereen Pyrintö; Helsingin Toverit
Medal record
Representing Finland
Olympic Games
Gold medal – first place	1924 Paris	10,000 m
Gold medal – first place	1924 Paris	3000 m steeplechase
Gold medal – first place	1924 Paris	3000 m team
Gold medal – first place	1924 Paris	Team cross country
Gold medal – first place	1928 Amsterdam	5000 m
Silver medal – second place	1924 Paris	Individual cross country
Silver medal – second place	1924 Paris	5000 m
Silver medal – second place	1928 Amsterdam	10,000 m

Vilho "Ville" Eino Ritola (18 January 1896 – 24 April 1982) was a Finnish long-distance runner. Known as one of the "Flying Finns", he won five Olympic gold medals and three Olympic silver medals in the 1920s. He holds the record of winning most athletics medals at a single Games – four golds and two silvers in Paris 1924 – and ranks second in terms of most athletics gold medals at a single Games.

== Childhood and emigration to the United States ==
Ritola's parents, Johannes Ritola (1851–1944) and Serafia Gevär (1863–1919), were farmers in western Finland near Seinäjoki. He was born in Peräseinäjoki, Finland. He was the 14th child in his family and had altogether 19 siblings, five of whom died in infancy. Six of the children were from his father's first marriage, 14 from the second, including Ville.

In 1913 he followed seven of his siblings and emigrated to the United States to work as a carpenter. There he started training in 1919 when he was already 23 years old. Later he referred many times to this late start of his sports career, and how it put him at a disadvantage compared to his rivals, especially the more famous of the Flying Finns, Paavo Nurmi, who started systematic training in his teens. In 1919 he joined the Finnish-American Athletic Club and trained together with Hannes Kolehmainen, who had moved to the United States after the 1912 Summer Olympics. In spring 1919 he took part in his first competition, a New York street race, and finished 33rd among 700 competitors. It was only after this that he started to train systematically.

Kolehmainen tried to convince the young Ritola to join the Finnish 1920 Summer Olympics team, but Ritola stated that he was not ready yet. He had also just married Selma née Aaltonen. In 1921 he started to compete systematically, and in 1922 he won his first AAU Championship gold medals. The same year he came second in the Boston Marathon.

== Paris Olympics 1924 ==
In 1923, American Finns started collecting funds to pay for Ville Ritola's trip to Finland, where in May 1924 he took part in the Finnish Olympic qualification competitions. In the 10,000 m qualifying race Ritola won with a world record time of 30.35.4. This was Ritola's first official world record.

At the 1924 Paris Olympics, he won four gold and two silver medals. He had a start on eight consecutive days to achieve this, all long-distance.

In his first race, the 10,000 m, in the absence of Nurmi, he won by half a lap and obliterated his own fresh world record by more than 12 seconds. Finnish officials had selected Ritola for the race as Nurmi was already running in five other distance events. Three days later, Ritola won the 3000 m steeplechase by 75 metres. The next day he finished second in the 5000 m, 0.2 seconds behind Nurmi. Ritola later earned another silver medal behind Nurmi in the individual cross-country race and gained a gold medal as a member of the Finnish cross-country team. Finally, Ritola joined Nurmi to win the 3000 m team race.

Ritola's 1924 triumph in Paris is historical. His six medals from Paris is still the biggest number of medals won by an athlete in one Olympic games event. His four gold medals put him in second place after Paavo Nurmi in the number of gold medals won by an athlete in one Olympic Games event.

== Back to the United States ==
After the Olympics, Ritola had to return to the US to find employment, while his pregnant wife remained in Finland. His daughter Anja was born in November 1924. Selma joined her husband in the US with the baby in March 1925.

In winter 1924–1925, Ritola competed in the United States and Canada and beat world record times in the 3000 m (8 min 26.8 sec), 3000 m steeplechase (9 min 18.6 sec), 5000 m (14 min 23.2 sec), 2 miles, 2 mile steeplechase, 3 miles and 5 miles. These were not official world records as they were run indoors.

== Amsterdam Olympics 1928 ==
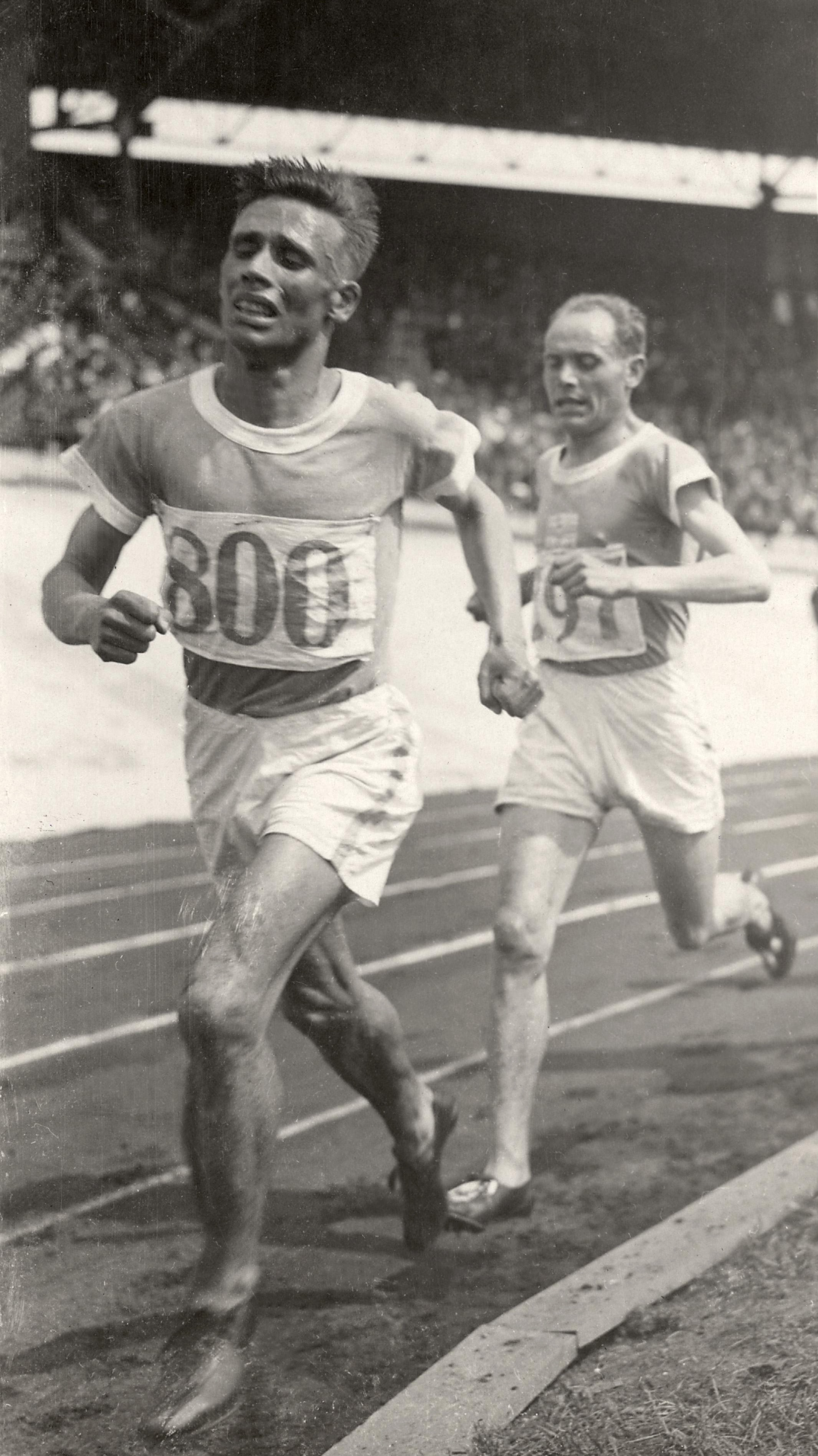
Ritola leads Paavo Nurmi in the 1928 Olympic 10000 m race.

In 1928, Ritola was 32 years old and had worked in construction for more than a decade. He had not trained systematically even though he still had won four gold medals in the AAU Championships 1927.

In the 1928 Summer Olympics, Ritola's main competitor was again Paavo Nurmi. This time each got one win. The first race was 10,000m. Ritola took the lead at 1,500m, and only four competitors followed. At 3,000m, Ray (US) dropped from the leading group and before 4,000m, Beavers (UK). As Wide (Sweden) dropped at 6,500m, only Nurmi followed Ritola. At 100m before the finish Nurmi sprinted and won by 0.6 seconds. Wide was third, losing by a 45.2s margin.

Ritola's last Olympic appearance was in the 5,000 m at the 1928 Summer Olympics. Both Ritola and Nurmi had hurt themselves in the steeplechase qualification competitions. Nurmi had a sore hip and Ritola a sore ankle. However, Ritola again took the lead at 2,500m. At 600m before the finish, only Ritola and Nurmi were left in the leading group. This time, Ritola pulled away from Nurmi in the final curve and won by 12 metres – 3 seconds. Wide nearly caught Nurmi, and Nurmi only held on to silver by a 0.2s margin. This victory brought Ritola's career total to five Olympic gold medals and three silver medals.

Ritola never competed in the Finnish championships, but won a handful of medals in the AAU Championships in the United States. He was the AAU champion at 6 miles (9.7 km) in 1927, at 10 miles (16 km) road race in 1922, 1923 and from 1925 to 1927, at 2,000 yd (1,800 m) steeplechase in 1923, 1926 and 1927 and at cross country in 1922, 1923 and from 1925 to 1927.

== After sports career ==
Ritola retired from athletics soon after the 1928 Olympic Games. He took part in only a few US competitions after 1928. He returned to American construction sites and worked in physically demanding jobs until 1959. He took US citizenship in 1937. His daughter, Anja Impola, married and lived in the US until her death in 2013. Ritola's wife Selma died in 1965 and he remarried, to Liisa Lauren, in 1967. Ritola moved back to Helsinki, Finland with his wife in 1971 and died in Helsinki aged 86.

== Honours ==
- A statue for Ville Ritola was prepared by sculptor Maija Nuotio in 1978 and placed in his homeplace Peräseinäjoki (now part of Seinäjoki).
- A sports hall in Peräseinäjoki was named RitolaHalli.
- At Ville Ritola's funeral in 1982 the coffin bearers included other Olympic heroes such as Lasse Virén.
- Kunto-Ritola, annual long-distance event

== Curiosities ==
Ritola's career inspired a phrase into colloquial Finnish. "Ottaa ritolat", translating as something like "pull a Ritola", means to make a quick exit from somewhere.

== See also ==
- List of multiple Olympic gold medalists
- List of multiple Olympic medalists at a single Games
- List of multiple Olympic gold medalists at a single Games
- List of multiple Summer Olympic medalists

Records
Preceded by Paavo Nurmi	Men's 10.000 m World Record Holder; 25 May 1924 – 31 August 1924	Succeeded by Paavo Nurmi
