= Maurice Norland =

French long-distance runner

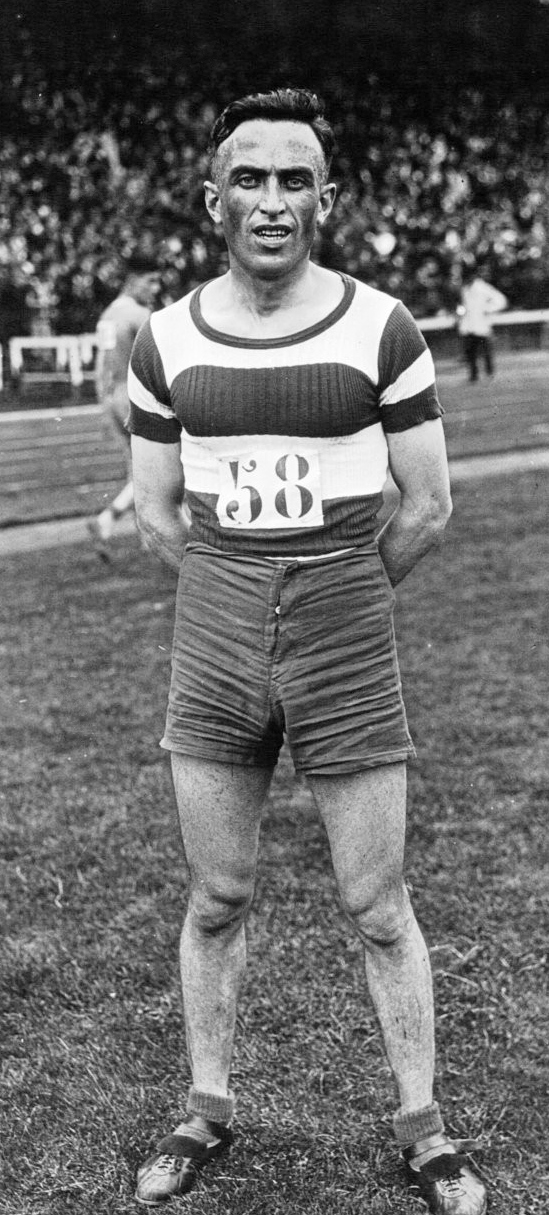
- Maurice Norland in 1927

Personal information
- Born: 30 July 1901 Auxerre, France
- Died: 18 May 1967 (aged 65) Migennes, France
- Height: 1.66 m (5 ft 5 in)
- Weight: 57 kg (126 lb)

Sport
- Sport: Athletics
- Event(s): 5000 m, steeplechase
- Club: Métropolitain Club Colombes

Achievements and titles
- Personal best(s): 5000 m – 15:06.6 (1926); 3000 mS – 9:56.4 (1927)
Medal record
Representing France
Olympic Games
Bronze medal – third place	1924 Paris	Cross country team

Maurice Marcel Jacques Norland (30 July 1901 – 18 May 1967) was a French long-distance runner. He competed at the 1924 Paris Olympics in the 5,000 m and 10,000 m cross-country races and won a team bronze medal in the cross-country event.
