= Athletics at the 1928 Summer Olympics – Men's 10,000 metres =

Men's 10,000 metres at the Games of the IX Olympiad
- Venue: Olympic Stadium
- Dates: July 29, 1928
- Competitors: 24 from 12 nations
- Winning time: 30:18.8

Medalists
1st place, gold medalist(s)		Paavo Nurmi	Finland
2nd place, silver medalist(s)		Ville Ritola	Finland
3rd place, bronze medalist(s)		Edvin Wide	Sweden

The men's 10,000 metres event was part of the track and field athletics programme at the 1928 Summer Olympics. The competition was held on Sunday, July 29, 1928. Twenty-four long-distance runners from twelve nations competed.

== Records ==
These were the standing world and Olympic records (in minutes) prior to the 1928 Summer Olympics.

World record	30:06.2	(Finland) Paavo Nurmi	Kuopio (FIN)	August 31, 1924
Olympic record	30:23.2	(Finland) Ville Ritola	Paris (FRA)	July 6, 1924

Paavo Nurmi set a new Olympic record with 30:18.8 minutes.

== Results ==
Only a final race was held.

Rank	Athlete	Nation	Time	Notes
1st place, gold medalist(s)	Paavo Nurmi	Finland	30:18.8	OR
2nd place, silver medalist(s)	Ville Ritola	Finland	30:19.4	
3rd place, bronze medalist(s)	Edvin Wide	Sweden	31:00.8	
4	Jean-Gunnar Lindgren	Sweden	31:26.0	
5	Arthur Muggridge	Great Britain	31:31.8	
6	Ragnar Magnusson	Sweden	31:37.2	
7	Toivo Loukola	Finland	31:39.0	
8	Kalle Matilainen	Finland	31:45.0	
9	Wally Beavers	Great Britain	31:48.0	
10	John Suttie Smith	Great Britain	31:50.0	
11	Robert Marchal	France	Unknown	
12	George Constable	Great Britain	Unknown	
13	Arturo Peña	Spain	32:21.8	
14	Joie Ray	United States	Unknown	
15	Staņislavs Petkēvičs	Latvia	Unknown	
16	Seghir Beddari	France	Unknown	
17	Karel Nedobitý	Czechoslovakia	Unknown	
18	Julien Serwy	Belgium	Unknown	
19	Juichi Nagatani	Japan	Unknown	
20	Danie Jacobs	South Africa	Unknown	
—	Henri Lauvaux	France	DNF	
—	Macauley Smith	United States	DNF	
—	John Romig	United States	DNF	
—	D. B. Chavan	India	DNF	
