= Athletics at the 1928 Summer Olympics – Men's 5000 metres =

Men's 5000 metres at the Games of the IX Olympiad
- Venue: Olympic Stadium
- Dates: July 31, 1928 (semifinals); August 3, 1928 (final)
- Competitors: 38 from 19 nations
- Winning time: 14:38.0

Medalists
1st place, gold medalist(s)		Ville Ritola	Finland
2nd place, silver medalist(s)		Paavo Nurmi	Finland
3rd place, bronze medalist(s)		Edvin Wide	Sweden

Official Video

The men's 5000 metres event was part of the track and field athletics programme at the 1928 Summer Olympics. The competition was held on Tuesday, July 31, 1928, and Friday, August 3, 1928. Thirty-eight long-distance runners from 19 nations competed.

== Records ==
These were the standing world and Olympic records (in minutes) prior to the 1928 Summer Olympics.

World record	14:28.2	(Finland) Paavo Nurmi	Helsinki (FIN)	June 19, 1924
Olympic record	14:31.2	(Finland) Paavo Nurmi	Paris (FRA)	July 10, 1924

== Results ==
=== Semifinals ===
All semifinals were held on Tuesday, July 31, 1928, and started at 5:10 p.m.

The best four finishers of every heat qualified for the final.

==== Semifinal 1 ====
Rank	Athlete	Nation	Time	Notes
1	Leo Lermond	United States	15:02.6	Q
2	Staņislavs Petkēvičs	Latvia	15:03.0	Q
3	Eino Purje	Finland	15:03.6	Q
4	Ragnar Magnusson	Sweden	15:03.8	Q
5	Wally Beavers	Great Britain		
6	Carl Petersen	Denmark	15:13.0	
7	Frederick Light	Great Britain		
8	Lucien Duquesne	France		
9	Seghir Beddari	France		
—	Ciro Chapa	Mexico	DNF	
—	Charles Haworth	United States	DNF	
—	Karel Nedobitý	Czechoslovakia	DNF	
—	Billy Kibblewhite	Canada	DNF	
—	Nol Wolf	Netherlands	DNF	
—	Julien Serwy	Belgium	DNF	

==== Semifinal 2 ====
Rank	Athlete	Nation	Time	Notes
1	Nils Eklöf	Sweden	15:07.4	Q
2	Ville Ritola	Finland	15:10.8	Q
3	Armas Kinnunen	Finland	15:10.8	Q
4	Brian Oddie	Great Britain	15:16.0	Q
5	Jesús Oyarbide	Spain	15:22.0	
6	Roger Pelé	France		
7	Willi Boltze	Germany	15:33.0	
8	Jozef Koščak	Czechoslovakia	15:42.0	
9	Andreas Paouris	Greece		
10	Julius Petraitis	Lithuania		
11	David Abbott	United States		
—	Art Keay	Canada	DNF	
—	George Hyde	Australia	DNF	
—	Pieter Gerbrands	Netherlands	DNF	

==== Semifinal 3 ====
Rank	Athlete	Nation	Time	Notes
1	Macauley Smith	United States	15:04.0	Q
2	Edvin Wide	Sweden	15:05.0	Q
3	Herbert Johnston	Great Britain	15:06.3	Q
4	Paavo Nurmi	Finland	15:08.0	Q
5	Otto Kohn	Germany		
6	Arie Klaase	Netherlands		
7	Arturo Peña	Spain	15:45.0	
8	Vincent Callard	Canada		
—	Gurbachan Singh	India	DNF	

=== Final ===
The final was held on Friday, August 3, 1928, and started at 2:30 p.m.

The same three runners finished on the podium as four years earlier in the 5000 metre event at the 1924 Games. But this time Ritola won the gold medal and Nurmi silver, Wide won the bronze medal again.

Rank	Athlete	Nation	Time
1st place, gold medalist(s)	Ville Ritola	Finland	14:38.0
2nd place, silver medalist(s)	Paavo Nurmi	Finland	14:40.0
3rd place, bronze medalist(s)	Edvin Wide	Sweden	14:41.2
4	Leo Lermond	United States	14:50.0
5	Ragnar Magnusson	Sweden	14:59.6
6	Armas Kinnunen	Finland	15:02.0
7	Staņislavs Petkēvičs	Latvia	
8	Herbert Johnston	Great Britain	
9	Brian Oddie	Great Britain	
10	Macauley Smith	United States	
—	Nils Eklöf	Sweden	DNF
—	Eino Purje	Finland	DNF
