= German Cross Country Championships =

Annual cross country running competition

- Date: March
- Location: Various, Germany
- Event type: Cross country
- Distance: 10 km and 4 km for men 6 km for women
- Established: 1891

The German Cross Country Championships (German: Deutsche Cross-Meisterschaften) is an annual cross country running competition that serves as Germany's national championship for the sport. It is usually held in March. It was first held in 1891 and featured a men's long course race only.

The competition had a break during 1914 and 1918 due to World War I and it ceased to be held after 1937 as a result of World War II. Following the occupation and division of Germany, the two German states set up separate national cross country championships. The Western side of the country restarted the championship in 1947 and this formally became the West German Cross Country Championships upon the nation's creation in 1949. A women's race was introduced in 1954 and the programme expanded further with a men's short course race in 1961 and a women's long course race in 1970. The East German Cross Country Championships started in 1950 and ahead of its Western counterpart in that it was responsible for the first women's championship in 1951. Men's short course was added in 1956 and a women's long course race was held in 1986. For both nations, the first women's races were short distance races.

After German reunification, the West Germany-based German Athletics Association took over the running of the competition and a single, annual German championships was once again held from 1991 onwards.

== Editions ==
All distances in kilometres

=== Post-reunification ===
Date	Venue	Men long course	km	Men Short course	km	Women's long course	km	Women's short course	km
7 March 2015	Markt Indersdorf	Manuel Stöckert	10.4	Benedict Karus	4.4	Corinna Harrer	6.0	—	—
8 March 2014	Löningen	Richard Ringer	10.28	Florian Orth	4.36	Sabrina Mockenhaupt	6.18	—	—
9 March 2013	Dornstetten	Richard Ringer	10.0	Florian Orth	4.3	Eleni Gebrehiwot	6.2	—	—
10 March 2012	Ohrdruf	Musa Roba-Kinkal	9.9	Tobias Gröbl	4.1	Eleni Gebrehiwot	5.2	—	—
5 March 2011	Löningen	Steffen Uliczka	10.3	Rico Schwarz	3.8	Sabrina Mockenhaupt	6.8	—	—
6 March 2010	Stockach	Christian Glatting	10.2	Carsten Schlangen	3.4	Sabrina Mockenhaupt	6.8	—	—
14 March 2009	Ingolstadt	Arne Gabius	10.1	Wolfram Müller	3.1	Sabrina Mockenhaupt	5.1	—	—
8 March 2008	Ohrdruf	Stephan Hohl	9.9	Franek Haschke	3.6	Sabrina Mockenhaupt	4.9	—	—
10 March 2007	Ohrdruf	Stephan Hohl	9.8	Wolfram Müller	3.8	Sabrina Mockenhaupt	5.3	—	—
11 March 2006	Regensburg	Sebastian Hallmann	9.8	Jonas Stifel	3.5	Susanne Ritter	4.7	—	—
26 November 2005	Darmstadt	Jens Borrmann	9.2	Dominik Burkhardt	4.0	Sabrina Mockenhaupt	5.3	—	—
27 November 2004	Bremen	Alexander Lubina	10.5	Jonas Stifel	3.9	Sabrina Mockenhaupt	5.7	—	—
8 March 2003	Bad Durrheim	André Green	10.5	Damian Kallabis	3.8	Sabrina Mockenhaupt	5.7	—	—
9 March 2002	Regensburg	Dieter Baumann	10.0	Jens Borrmann	3.9	Luminita Zaituc	5.3	—	—
3 March 2001	Regensburg	André Green	10.0	Jens Borrmann	3.9	Luminita Zaituc	6.7	Luminita Zaituc	3.9
2 December 2000	Wetter	Sebastian Hallmann	10.5	Jan Fitschen	3.8	Irina Mikitenko	7.2	Irina Mikitenko	3.8
27 November 1999	Süchteln	Rainer Wachenbrunner	9.8	Rüdiger Stenzel	4.2	Sonja Oberem	7.6	Luminita Zaituc	3.5
29 November 1998	Heringsdorf	Christian Fischer	10.0	Rainer Wachenbrunner	3.5	Petra Wassiluk	6.0	Petra Wassiluk	3.5
1 March 1997	Gotha	Dieter Baumann	9.7	Michael Busch	3.3	Claudia Dreher	6.5	Luminita Zaituc	3.3
30 November 1996	Hamburg	Uwe König	9.0	Rüdiger Stenzel	3.5	Claudia Lokar	5.3	Luminita Zaituc	3.5
4 March 1995	Wetter	Dieter Baumann	10.6	Jens Karrass	3.8	Claudia Lokar	7.2	Petra Wassiluk	3.8
5 March 1994	Burghaslach	Stephan Freigang	10.8	Uwe König	3.8	Claudia Lokar	7.3	Christina Mai	3.8
6 March 1993	Rhede	Stephan Freigang	12.4	Ralf Dahmen	2.8	Claudia Dreher	7.6	Claudia Metzner	2.8
7 March 1992	Iffezheim	Rainer Wachenbrunner	10.5	Hauke Fuhlbrügge	4.2	Claudia Borgschulze	6.3	Claudia Metzner	2.1
March 1991	Bad Harzburg	Heinz-Bernd Bürger	?	Klaus-Peter Nabein	?	Christina Mai	?	Steffi Kallensee	?

=== Pre-WWII ===
Date	Venue	Men long course	km
8 November 1936	Freiburg	Max Syring	10.0
3 November 1935	Wittenberg	Max Syring	
22 April 1934	Dresden	Max Syring	10.0
23 April 1933	Hohen Neuendorf	Otto Kohn	10.0
24 April 1932	Stuttgart-Degerloch	Otto Kohn	10.0
26 April 1931	Hannover	Otto Kohn	10.0
27 April 1930	Erfurt	Hermann Helber	10.0
28 April 1929	Frankfurt	Otto Kohn	10.4
22 April 1928	Weimar	Wilhelm Husen	10.0
24 April 1927	Heilbronn	Otto Petri	10.4
11 April 1926	Siegburg	Alfred Rätze	10.6
5 April 1925	Bergedorf.	Fritz Graßmann	10.0
6 April 1924	Fürstenwalde	Fritz Graßmann	10.0
8 April 1923	Breslau	Wilhelm Husen	
2 April 1922	Dresden	Paul Ribbert	10.0
28 March 1921	Munich	Albert Tschaber	10.0
18 April 1920	Berlin	Richard Lauterbach	10.0
19 October 1919	Berlin	Richard Lauterbach	7.5
5 October 1913	Berlin	Fritz Blankenburg	7.5
