= Arthur Muggridge =

British long-distance runner

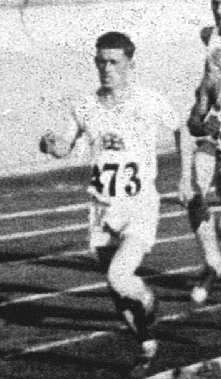
- Arthur Muggridge in 1928

Personal information
- Full name: Arthur Thomas Muggridge
- Nationality: British (English)
- Born: 7 December 1904 Cuckfield, England
- Died: 25 July 1933 (aged 28) Steyning, England

Sport
- Sport: Long-distance running
- Event: 10,000 metres
- Club: Polytechnic Harriers

Arthur Thomas Muggridge (7 December 1904 – 25 July 1933) was a British long-distance runner who competed at the 1928 Summer Olympics.

== Career ==
Muggridge finished second behind Joe Blewitt in the 4 miles event at the 1925 AAA Championships.

Muggridge finished second behind Wally Beavers in the 4 miles event at the 1928 AAA Championships. Shortly afterwards he represented Great Britain at the 1928 Olympic Games in Amsterdam, Netherlands, where he competed in the men's 10,000 metres.

== Personal best times ==
- 5000 metres: 15:12.8 min – August 28, 1927, Cologne
- 10,000 metres: 31:31.8 min – July 29, 1928, Amsterdam
