= Fred Light =

British long-distance runner

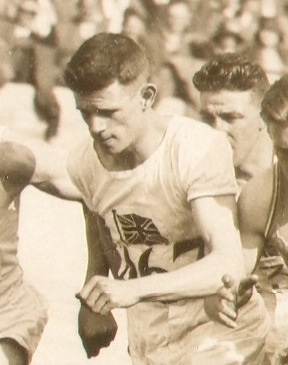
- Fred Light in 1928

Personal information
- Nationality: British (English)
- Born: Frederick Light; 11 December 1906 Rowton, England
- Died: Q3. 1963 (aged 56) Staffordshire, England

Sport
- Sport: Long-distance running
- Event: 5000 metres
- Club: Birchfield Harriers

Frederick Light (11 December 1906 – 1963) was a British long-distance runner who competed at the 1928 Summer Olympics.

== Career ==
Light finished third behind Wally Beavers in the 4 miles event at the 1928 AAA Championships. Shortly afterwards he represented Great Britain at the 1928 Olympic Games in Amsterdam, Netherlands, where he competed in the men's 5000 metres.
