= Arie Klaase =

Dutch long-distance runner

Personal information
- Full name: Adrianus "Arie" Klaase
- Nationality: Dutch
- Born: 23 September 1903
- Died: 20 November 1983 (aged 80)

Sport
- Sport: Long-distance running
- Event: 5000 metres

Adrianus "Arie" Klaase (23 September 1903 – 20 November 1983) was a Dutch long-distance runner. He competed in the men's 5000 metres at the 1928 Summer Olympics.
