= Paavo Nurmi statue =

Sculpture by Wäinö Aaltonen (1925)

Coordinates: 60°11′04″N 24°55′39″E

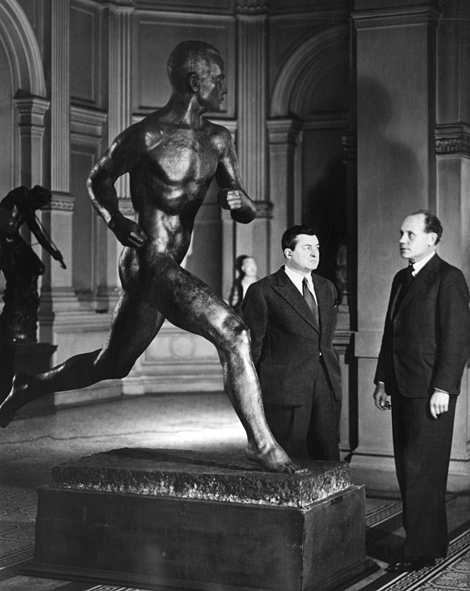
Paavo Nurmi (1897–1973) and Wäinö Aaltonen (1894–1966) with the statue at the Ateneum art museum in the 1930s.

The Paavo nurmi statue (also known as the Paavo Nurmi runner statue) is a whole-body sculpture of runner Paavo Nurmi, the most successful Olympic athlete in Finland, made by sculptor Wäinö Aaltonen. The bronze sculpture was made in 1925 and there have been four additional casts of it. The statue has become a symbol for Finnish sport and the independent Finnish nation as well as an envoy of the image of Finland.

The order represented the start of the career as a trusted national artist for Aaltonen. He had earlier made a significant local impact in the Turku area. The sculpture order was given to Aaltonen as an "improvement prize" as he was considered the most talented among young sculptors. The sculpture was also the first sculpture representing an athlete to be ordered by the state of Finland.

== Style ==
Paavo Nurmi posed as Aaltonen's model in the Hirvensalo atelier. The sculpture was not made into a naturalist portrait, instead the goal was to create an idealistic "monument of a Finnish runner". Aaltonen sought a dynamic and light position for the runner character. In his search for a proper movement and position Aaltonen also used photographs of Nurmi's exercise technics published in Toivo J. Kaila's book.

The image of the sculpture is light and airy. Its weight rests on the toes of Nurmi's right foot. Because of artistic reasons, the sculpture depicts Nurmi as stepping on his toes, although in reality he stepped on his entire foot. The twisted position of the sculpture's torso refers to Nurmi's characteristic long step starting from his pelvis.

Unlike most sculptures of notable persons, the sculpture is nude. This refers to the admiration of ancient Greek art prominent in the 1920s. The sculpture is a direct reference to the nude athletes of ancient Greece and the continuation of Hellenistic art.

The sculpture received positive reviews both in Finland and abroad. Typical to its time, it was judged on a racial basis, and it was seen to represent the properties of the Finnish people and race.

== Reception and phases ==
=== In the Ateneum art museum ===
The Finnish state ordered a full-body sculpture of Paavo Nurmi from sculptor Wäinö Aaltonen on 1 October 1924, when Nurmi had won five gold medals at the 1924 Summer Olympics in Paris, France. Wäinö Aaltonen's clay model was completed already in the same year and the bronze cast by Aukusti Veuro in autumn 1925.

The finished statue was temporarily placed in the Ateneum art museum to await placement at a public place. The Helsinki Olympic Stadium, already being planned at the time, was seen as a suitable place. Although the sculpture had received many favourable reviews abroad, the depiction of a Finnish national hero in the nude shocked the Finnish public so much that the sculpture remained inside the Ateneum art museum even upon the completion of the stadium in 1938.

=== Outdoor sculpture in Helsinki and Turku ===
At the time of the 1952 Summer Olympics in Helsinki the situation and time became favourable for outdoor placement of the statue. Instead of moving the original cast of the sculpture, it was decided to make a new copy of the sculpture, which was revealed at the front field of the Helsinki Olympic Stadium in connection with the Olympic Games. The sculpture was also prominently featured in the official poster of the Olympic Games.

The third copy of the sculpture was revealed in Nurmi's home city of Turku in 1955 on the Itäinen Rantakatu street near the Auransilta bridge, only a few years after the Olympic Games. The sculpture was donated to the city of Turku by the company Wärtsilä. The sculpture was later moved a few metres closer to the harbour from its original position because of intersection arrangements and a traffic lights column placed right in front of the statue. The statue is located on a traffic island.

=== In Jyväskylä and abroad ===
The first cast of the statue was shown at numerous foreign exhibitions in the 1950s and 1960s, but its proper site remained at the Ateneum.

In 1983 the cast was deposited to the University of Jyväskylä. It was placed at the Seminaarinmäki campus, at the Aallonpuisto park next to the faculty of athletic sciences. In 1994, the Ateneum wanted the statue back for a centenary exhibition of Wäinö Aaltonen. This resulted in controversy as the Ateneum had neglected to inform the University of Jyväskylä about this.

In honour of Aaltonen's centenary a fourth cast was made of the statue, which the state donated to the Olympic Museum park of the International Olympic Committee in Lausanne, Switzerland.

The University of Jyväskylä kept waiting for the statue's return, so the controversy increased when the Ateneum announced that because of the statue's poor condition it would henceforth be stored inside the Ateneum building. The newspaper Keskisuomalainen published a headline: "Culture scandal - the Nurmi statue taken from Jyväskylä is hardly coming back any more". The Jyväskylä society negotiated with Aaltonen's heirs about making a new cast and collected money for this. In addition to corporations and private people, donations were made by the Ministry of Education, the city of Jyväskylä and the University of Jyväskylä. The cast was completed in 2000 at Kellokoski and it was revealed on its original pedestal in the next year. As there only was permission to make five casts of the sculpture, the Jyväskylä statue was the last one.

== Casts of the statue ==
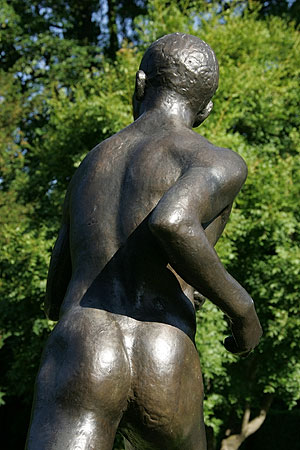
The Paavo Nurmi statue in Lausanne, Switzerland.

1. At the Ateneum art museum 1925-1983, at the campus of the University of Jyväskylä 1983-1993, at the Ateneum art museum since 1993
2. At the front field of the Helsinki Olympic Stadium since 9 July 1952
3. At the Itäinen Rantakatu street in Turku since 26 January 1955
4. At the Olympic Museum park of the International Olympic Committee in Lausanne, Switzerland since 22 October 1994
5. The last cast in 2000, at the park area of the campus of the University of Jyväskylä since 15 March 2001

== Other applications ==
The sculpture has been popular and it has had a great symbolic value. In addition to the poster of the 1952 Summer Olympics in Helsinki, numerous advertisements and postcards the sculpture was featured on the 10 markka banknote. A Paavo Nurmi memorial postage stamp was also made based on the sculpture, which was launched after Nurmi's death in October 1973.

Miniature statues of the sculpture were mass produced in the early 1950s. These were used to finance athletic facilities at the Otaniemi student village in Espoo. These miniature statues also showed Nurmi only touching the ground with the toes of his right foot. These miniature sculptures made of type metal were 40 centimetres tall. Some miniature sculptures were also cast in bronze. There were plans to make more miniature casts of the sculpture and market them in the United States. The total number of casts is not known, but probably it was smaller than anticipated.

One miniature Paavo Nurmi sculpture caused confusion when it was found in the middle of historical items and junk on the deck of the ship Vasa which had lain at the bottom of the sea in front of Stockholm, Sweden for 333 years until the ship was lifted to the surface in 1961. The explanation was simple: this was a case of a teekkari student prank, the statue had only been placed on the ship during the previous night.
