= Brian Oddie =

British long-distance runner

Personal information
- Nationality: British (English)
- Born: 16 May 1905 Luton, England
- Died: 7 August 1996 (aged 91) Bracknell, England
- Height: 176 cm (5 ft 9 in)
- Weight: 60 kg (132 lb)

Sport
- Sport: Long-distance running
- Event: 5000 metres
- Club: South London Harriers

Brian Cecil Vernon Oddie (16 May 1905 – 7 August 1996) was a British long-distance runner who competed at the 1928 Summer Olympics.

== Career ==
Oddie finished third behind Swede Bror Ohrn in the 4 miles event at the 1927 AAA Championships.

Oddie competed in the men's 5000 metres at the 1928 Olympic Games.

Shortly before the 1930 British Empire Games in Canada, Oddie finished second behind Lauri Virtanen in the 4 miles event at the 1930 AAA Championships. At the 1930 British Empire Games he competed in the 3 mile race for England. Oddie was also a civil servant at the time of the 1930 Games and lived in Luton.
