= Andreas Paouris =

Greek long-distance runner

Personal information
- Nationality: Greek
- Born: 13 November 1902

Sport
- Sport: Long-distance running
- Event: 5000 metres

Andreas Paouris (born 13 November 1902, date of death unknown) was a Greek long-distance runner. He competed in the men's 5000 metres at the 1928 Summer Olympics.
