= George Constable =

British long-distance runner

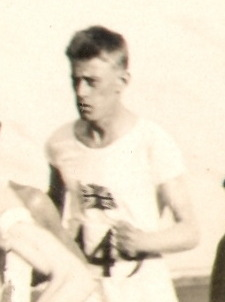
- George Constable in 1928

Personal information
- Full name: Charles George Constable
- Nationality: British (English)
- Born: July 1904 Fenny Stratford, England
- Died: 14 April 1932 (aged 27) Charing Cross, London, England

Sport
- Sport: Long-distance running
- Event: 10,000 metres
- Club: Surrey AC

Charles George Constable (July 1904 – 14 April 1932) was a British long-distance runner who competed at the 1928 Summer Olympics.

== Career ==
Constable finished second behind Jack Webster in the steeplechase event at the 1926 AAA Championships and repeated the feat the following year, finishing second behind Ernie Harper, but this time in the 10 miles event at the 1927 AAA Championships.

Constable competed in the men's 10,000 metres at the 1928 Olympics Games.
