= Aleksis Kivi Memorial =

Bronze statue in Helsinki, Finland

- Aleksis Kiven muistopatsas
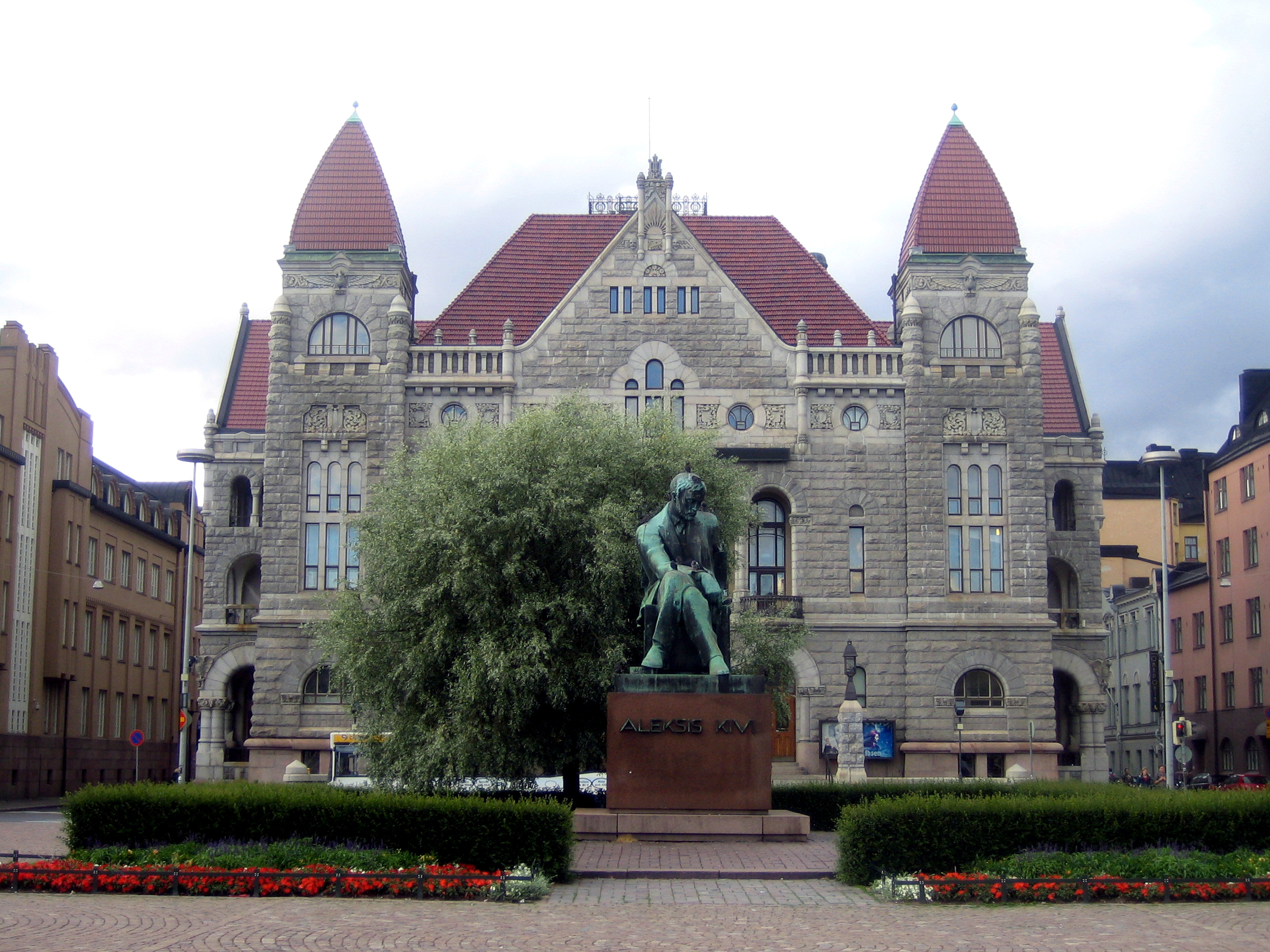
- Aleksis Kivi Memorial front of the Finnish National Theatre
- Interactive map of Aleksis Kivi Memorial
- Location: Helsinki Railway Square
- Coordinates: 60°10′18.05″N 024°56′38.08″E
- Designer: Wäinö Aaltonen
- Material: Bronze
- Completion date: 1939
- Website: Official website

The Aleksis Kivi Memorial (Finnish: Aleksis Kiven muistopatsas) is a statue dedicated to the Finnish author Aleksis Kivi (1834–1872), designed and sculpted by Wäinö Aaltonen.

== History ==
Unveiled on 10 October 1939, the bronze statue is located in the Helsinki Railway Square, in front of the Finnish National Theatre. The statue, along with most of Helsinki's public artwork, is owned and maintained by the Helsinki Art Museum. The sculpture was originally chosen through a contest; Aaltonen's submission was originally a more abstract cubist piece, but the selection committee chose him with the caveat that he would redesign the statue to be more realistic in appearance.

== Description ==
The memorial depicts a complentative (even melancholic) Kivi sitting in a chair. On the chair are reliefs inspired by three of Kivi's works: Sydämeni laulu, Keinu and Seitsemän veljestä pakenee Impivaarasta. The back of the chair features two stanzas from his poem, Ikävyys ("Melancholy"): (Note: Translated by Douglas Robinson in Aleksis Kivi and/as World Literature)

Mi ikävyys,
mi hämäryys sieluni ympär
kuin syksy-iltainen autiol maal?
Turha vaiva täällä,
turha ompi taistelo
ja kaikkisuus maailman, turha!

En taivasta
mä tahdo, en yötä Gehennan,
enp' enään neitosta syliini suo.
Osani vain olkoon:
tietämisen tuskast pois.
kaik' äänetön tyhjyys olkoon.

What dreadness dear,
what gloaming gloom looms round my soul
like an autumn's eve in a barren land?
All here is vain,
the strife the struggle vain
the world's wide wholeness, vain!

No heav'nly joy
want I, no Gehennan midnight,
no maid e'er again in my arms shall I take.
My lot, be it e'er only:
away from the aches of knowing,
let all be the voiceless void.

== See also ==
- Sibelius monument
- Equestrian statue of Marshal Mannerheim
- Three Smiths Statue
