= Nol Wolf =

Dutch long-distance runner

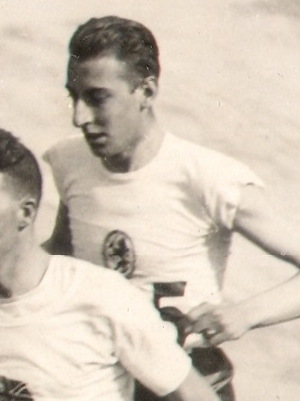
- Nol Wolf in 1928

Personal information
- Full name: Arnoldus Antonius Wilhelmus "Nol" Wolf
- Nationality: Dutch
- Born: 7 August 1903 The Hague, Netherlands
- Died: 21 September 1982 (aged 79) The Hague, Netherlands

Sport
- Sport: Long-distance running
- Event: 5000 metres

Arnoldus Antonius Wilhelmus "Nol" Wolf (7 August 1903 – 21 September 1982) was a Dutch long-distance runner. He competed in the men's 5000 metres at the 1928 Summer Olympics.
