= Staņislavs Petkēvičs =

Latvian athlete

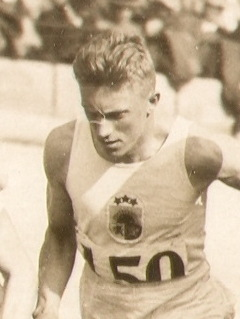

Personal information
- Nationality: Latvian
- Born: 7 November 1908
- Died: 29 December 1960 (aged 52)

Sport
- Sport: Long-distance running
- Event: 5000 metres

Staņislavs Petkēvičs (7 November 1908 – 29 December 1960) was a Latvian-Polish long-distance runner. He competed in the men's 5000 metres at the 1928 Summer Olympics.

== Career ==
He took part in the 1928 Summer Olympics in Amsterdam representing Latvia and claiming 7th place in the 5000 m race. Since 1929, he represented Poland. He trained at the KS Warszawianka Sports Club and was one of the major rivals of Janusz Kusociński.

In 1938, he graduated from the Józef Piłsudski University of Physical Education in Warsaw. He was a three-time Polish Champion, and thirteen-time Polish record holder in the 1500 m, 2000 m, 3000 m, 5000 m, 10 000 m as well as 800-200-400-200 m relay races. In 1929, he became one of few athletes who won against Paavo Nurmi. In 1929, he was chosen the Polish Sportspersonality of the Year.

Between 1934 and 1939, he worked as a coach of Polish middle- and long-distance runners team. In 1939, he emigrated to Argentina and worked as a PE teacher. In 1945, he established the Instituto de Cúltura Física in Buenos Aires.

== See also ==
- Polish Sportspersonality of the Year
- Sport in Poland
- List of Poles
