= Carl Petersen (runner) =

Danish long-distance runner

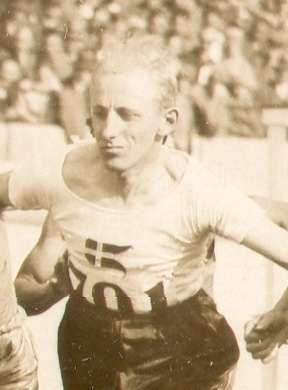
- Carl Petersen in 1928

Personal information
- Full name: Carl Axel Holger Petersen
- Nationality: Danish
- Born: 15 February 1902
- Died: 27 September 1983 (aged 81)

Sport
- Sport: Long-distance running
- Event: 5000 metres

Carl Axel Holger Petersen (15 February 1902 – 27 September 1983) was a Danish long-distance runner. He competed in the men's 5000 metres at the 1928 Summer Olympics.
