= Wäinö Aaltonen =

Finnish artist and sculptor (1894–1966)

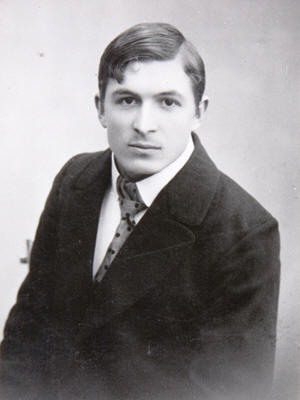
- Aaltonen in the early 20th century
- Born: 8 March 1894; Marttila, Finland
- Died: 30 May 1966 (aged 72); Helsinki, Finland
- Occupation: Sculptor
- Years active: 1916–1961
- Notable work: Paavo Nurmi statue, 1925; Aleksis Kivi Memorial, 1939; Statues in the plenary chamber of Parliament House
- Children: Children with Aino Aliisa Aaltonen :Matti Aaltonen,Aino Lea Aaltonen-Everhall,Maija Liisa Aaltonen (Pfeifer),Anja Angnelica Aaltonen (Vorberg)

Wäinö Valdemar Aaltonen (8 March 1894 – 30 May 1966) was a Finnish artist and sculptor. The Chambers Biographical Dictionary describes him as "one of the leading Finnish sculptors".

He was born to a tailor in the village of Karinainen, Finland. He attended the School of Drawing of the Turku Art Association from age 16, or specifically between 1910 and 1915. He had spent many of the early years at this school studying painting under Victor Westerholm, but he was mainly self-taught as a sculptor. He learned the technics of treatment of marble with his relative Aarre Aaltonen, and by working as a trainee stonemason in Hirvensalo. Sculptor Felix Nylund was a substitute teacher in the art school in Turku for one season, and his work was inspiration for young Aaltonen.

A journey Aaltonen made to Italy in 1923 opened his eyes to cubist and futurist art. These elements can primarily be seen in his paintings.

As the Republic of Finland arose, and the First World War raged, he sculpted War Memorials. He soon became a nationalist icon, the exemplar Finn, establishing an exhibition in Stockholm in 1927. His sculpture is nationalist in nature, and he is noted for monumental figures and busts portraying citizens of Finland. An example is the 1925 sculpture of Paavo Nurmi, a cast of which is exhibited outside the Helsinki stadium. A fourth cast of the statue was donated by the Republic of Finland to the park of the Olympic Museum of the International Olympic Committee in Lausanne, Switzerland. Another notable work is that of Jean Sibelius, a bust of 1928. These two works, like the main body of his work, are bronze casts—though he did work in stone and even glass. Though chiefly naturalistic, the cubist influence is also present here. He was one of the early 20th-century pioneers of direct carving.

When the new House of Parliament for Finland was built, architect Johan Sigfrid Sirén wished he could buy sculptures directly from Aaltonen. Instead, an open competition was announced, and Aaltonen's Work and the Future was selected as the winner. The series of gilded sculptures that Aaltonen completed in 1932 were cast in bronze after his death.

Aaltonen was married four times. His first wife was singer Aino Alisa Pietikäinen from 1920, second wife actor Elsa Emilia Rantalainen from 1931, third wife gallerist in Galerie Artek Elvi Elisabet Hernell from 1942 and fourth wife medical doctor Marie Elisabeth Maasik from year 1961. His son Matti Aaltonen became an architect, who with Irma Aaltonen designed the Wäinö Aaltonen Museum of Art in Turku.

== Works ==
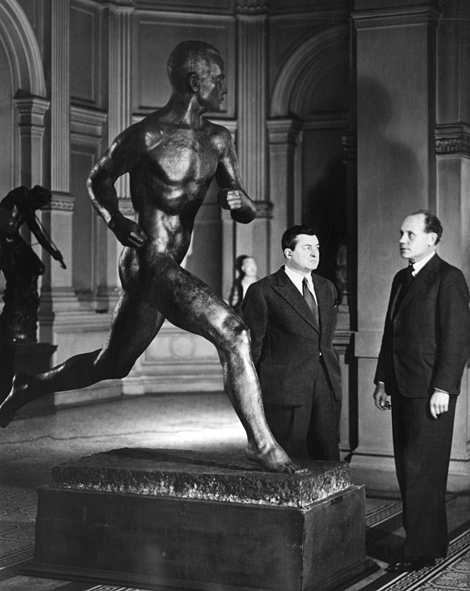
Paavo Nurmi and Wäinö Aaltonen in front of Aaltonen's bronze statue of Nurmi at Ateneum in the late 1930s

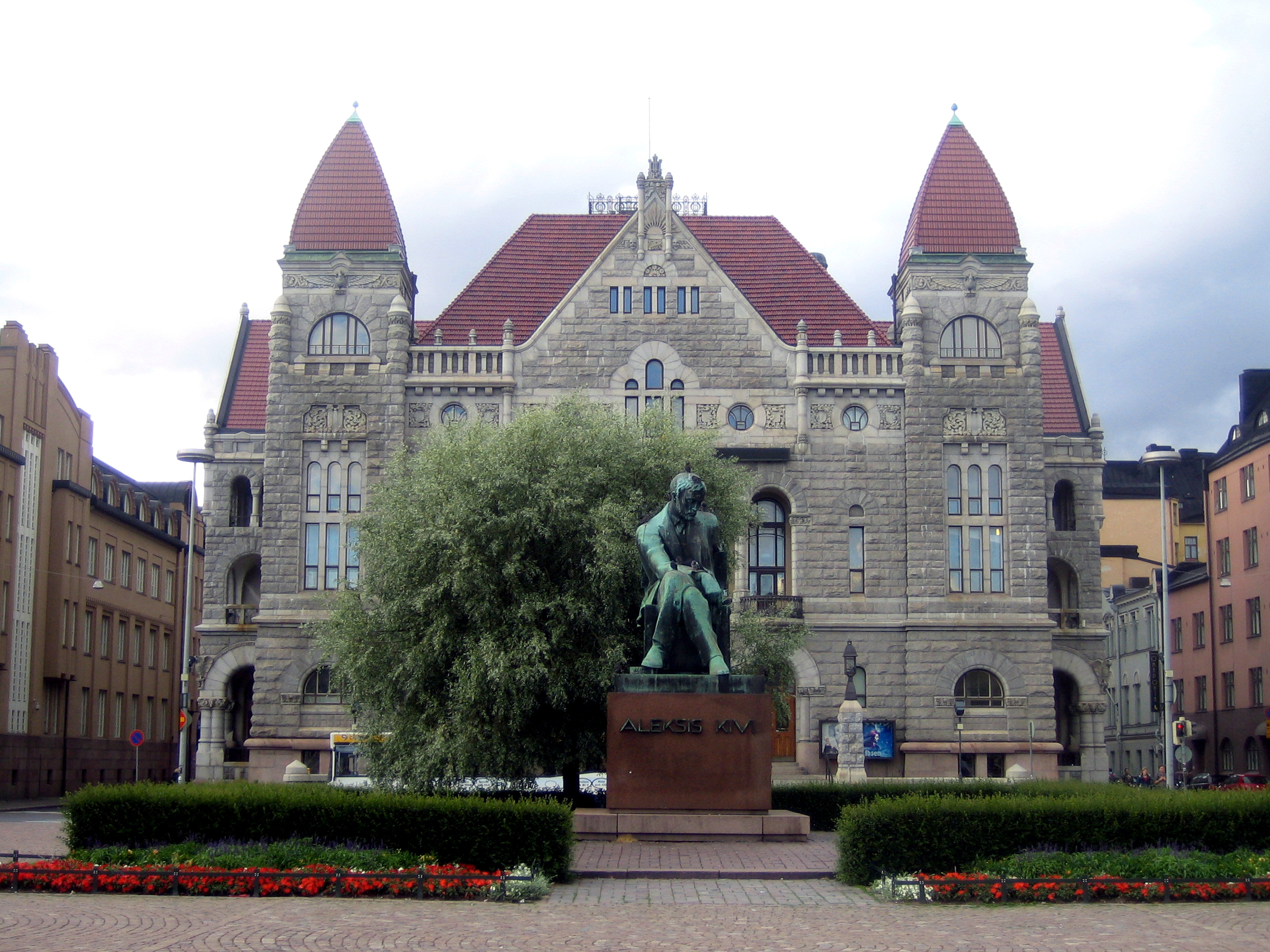
The Aleksis Kivi Memorial in front of the Finnish National Theatre

- Tytön pää, n. 1917
- Graniittipoika, 1917–1920
- Maria Jotuni, 1918–1920
- Opettajani, 1919
- Aaro Hellaakosken pronssipää, 1919
- Savonlinnan sankaripatsas, (The Hero's Grave) 1919–1921
- Punagraniittinen neito, 1923
- Mustagraniittinen neito, 1924
- Paavo Nurmi runner statue, 1924–1925
- Seisova nainen, 1920–1924
- Istuva nainen, 1920–1925
- Uimaan lähtevä nainen, 1924
- Turun Lilja, n. 1924–1926
- Musica, 1926
- Aleksis Kivi statue (Tampere), 1926–1927
- Statues on Hämeensilta bridge, Tampere: Eränkävijä (the Hunter), Veronkantaja (the Tax Collector), Kauppias (the Merchant) ja Suomen neito (the Maiden of Finland), 1927–1929
- Myrsky (Memorial statue for the 53 victims of the sunken Finnish torpedo boat S2 in Reposaari, Pori), 1930
- Statues in the plenary chamber of Parliament House 1930–1932
- Aleksis Kivi Memorial (Helsinki), 1930–1939
- Marjatta, 1934
- Delaware-muistomerkki, 1937–1938
- Vapauden jumalatar seppelöi nuoruuden, 1939–1940
- Memorial of the Battle of Kämärä, 1939/1949
- Tampereen Osuustoimintamuistomerkki, 1949–1950
- Ystävyys solmitaan (Joint monument for the cities of Turku and Gothenburg), n. 1948–1955
- Lahden sankaripatsas, 1952
- Rautatienrakentajien muistomerkki, 1957, Hyvinkää
- Genius ohjaa nuoruutta (in front of the University of Turku main library), 1958–1960
- Statues of presidents in front of Parliament house: K. J. Ståhlberg, 1957–1958; P. E. Svinhufvud, 1957–1959
- Genius Montanus (on Aaltonen's grave in Turku), 1960
- Johannes Gutenberg, 1962 (Büste)
