= Charles Haworth =

American long-distance runner

Personal information
- Full name: Charles Edwin Haworth
- Nationality: American
- Born: August 25, 1906
- Died: August 4, 1986 (aged 79)

Sport
- Sport: Long-distance running
- Event: 5000 metres

Charles Edwin Haworth (August 25, 1906 – August 4, 1986) was an American long-distance runner. He competed in the men's 5000 metres at the 1928 Summer Olympics.

Haworth competed for the William Penn Statesmen track and field team in the NCAA.
