= Willi Boltze =

German long-distance runner (1904–1937)

Personal information
- Full name: Wilhelm Andreas Boltze
- Nationality: German
- Born: 24 July 1904 Hamburg, Germany
- Died: 25 October 1937 (aged 33) Hamburg, Germany

Sport
- Sport: Long-distance running
- Event: 5000 metres

Wilhelm Andreas "Willi" Boltze (24 July 1904 – 25 October 1937) was a German long-distance runner. He competed in the men's 5000 metres at the 1928 Summer Olympics. Boltze committed suicide in 1937.
