= Jesús Oyarbide =

Spanish long-distance runner

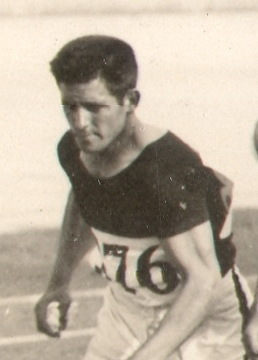
- Jesús Oyarbide in 1928

Personal information
- Nationality: Spanish
- Born: 2 February 1902
- Died: 23 March 1933 (aged 31)

Sport
- Sport: Long-distance running
- Event: 5000 metres

Jesús Oyarbide (2 February 1902 – 23 March 1933) was a Spanish long-distance runner. He competed in the men's 5000 metres at the 1928 Summer Olympics.
