= Billy Kibblewhite =

Canadian long-distance runner

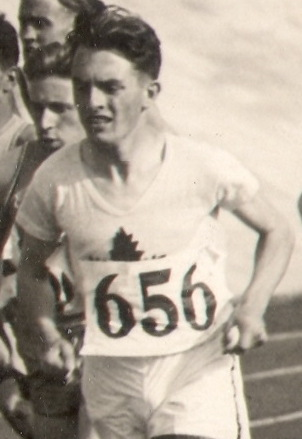
- Billy Kibblewhite in 1928

Personal information
- Full name: William Edward "Billy" Kibblewhite
- Nationality: Canadian
- Born: 6 October 1909 Calgary, Alberta, Canada
- Died: 5 February 1951 (aged 41)

Sport
- Sport: Long-distance running
- Event: 5000 metres

William Edward Kibblewhite (6 October 1909 – 5 February 1951) was a Canadian long-distance runner. He competed in the men's 5000 metres at the 1928 Summer Olympics.
