= Edvin Wide =

Swedish runner (1896–1996)

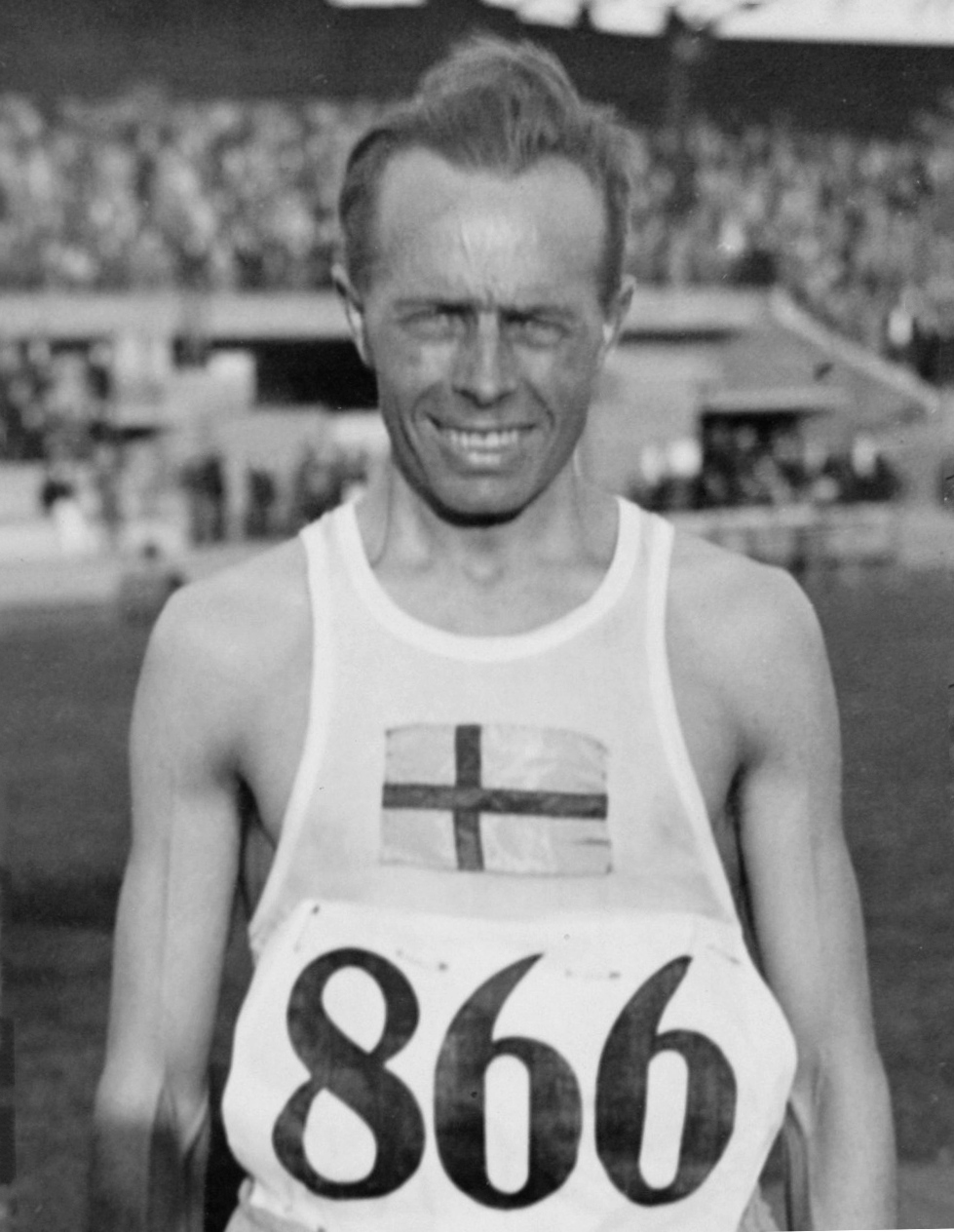
- Edvin Wide at the 1928 Olympics

Personal information
- Born: 22 February 1896 Kimito, Finland
- Died: 19 June 1996 (aged 100) Stockholm, Sweden

Sport
- Sport: Athletics
- Events: 1500 m, 3000 m
- Club: Enköpings AIF, Enköping; IF Linnéa, Stockholm

Achievements and titles
- Personal bests: 1500 m – 3:51.8 (1926); 5000 m – 14:40.4 (1925); 10,000 m – 30:55.2 (1924)
Medal record
Representing Sweden
Olympic Games
Silver medal – second place	1924 Paris	10,000 m
Bronze medal – third place	1920 Antwerp	3,000 m team
Bronze medal – third place	1924 Paris	5,000 m
Bronze medal – third place	1928 Amsterdam	5,000 m
Bronze medal – third place	1928 Amsterdam	10,000 m

Emil Edvin Wide (22 February 1896 – 19 June 1996) was a Swedish middle-distance and long-distance runner.

== Biography ==
Born in Finland as Emil Edvin Hermansson, Wide moved to Sweden in 1918. He competed for Sweden at the 1920 Summer Olympics in the 3000 metre team event, winning a bronze medal, together with Eric Backman and Sven Lundgren. At the 1924 Olympics, he won a silver medal in the 10,000 m behind Ville Ritola of Finland. He also finished third in the 5,000 m, behind Ville Ritola and Paavo Nurmi.

At the 1928 Summer Olympics, the 5,000 metre medals went to the same people as in 1924, only the Finns swapped medals, leaving Edvin with his third Olympic bronze medal. He finished behind the same two yet again for the third time in Olympic competition to win the bronze medal in the 10,000 metres.

Nationally Wide won 12 Swedish titles: five in the cross country (1922–26), four in the 1,500 m and three in the 5,000 m, and held Swedish records over 1,500 m, 5,000 m and 10,000 m. He also held world records in non-Olympic 4 × 1500 m, 2000 m and 3000 m events, and won the United States two-mile indoor championships in 1929.

Wide lived most of his life near Enköping, where he worked as a school teacher and then headmaster. In 1926, he was awarded the Svenska Dagbladet Gold Medal. He retired from competitions in 1930.

Wide died at the age of 100. He was survived by his wife, Axelina (age 99), and two sons.

Records
Preceded by (Finland) Paavo Nurmi	Men's 3,000m World Record Holder; 7 June 1925 – 24 May 1926	Succeeded by (Finland) Paavo Nurmi
