= Roger Pelé =

French long-distance runner

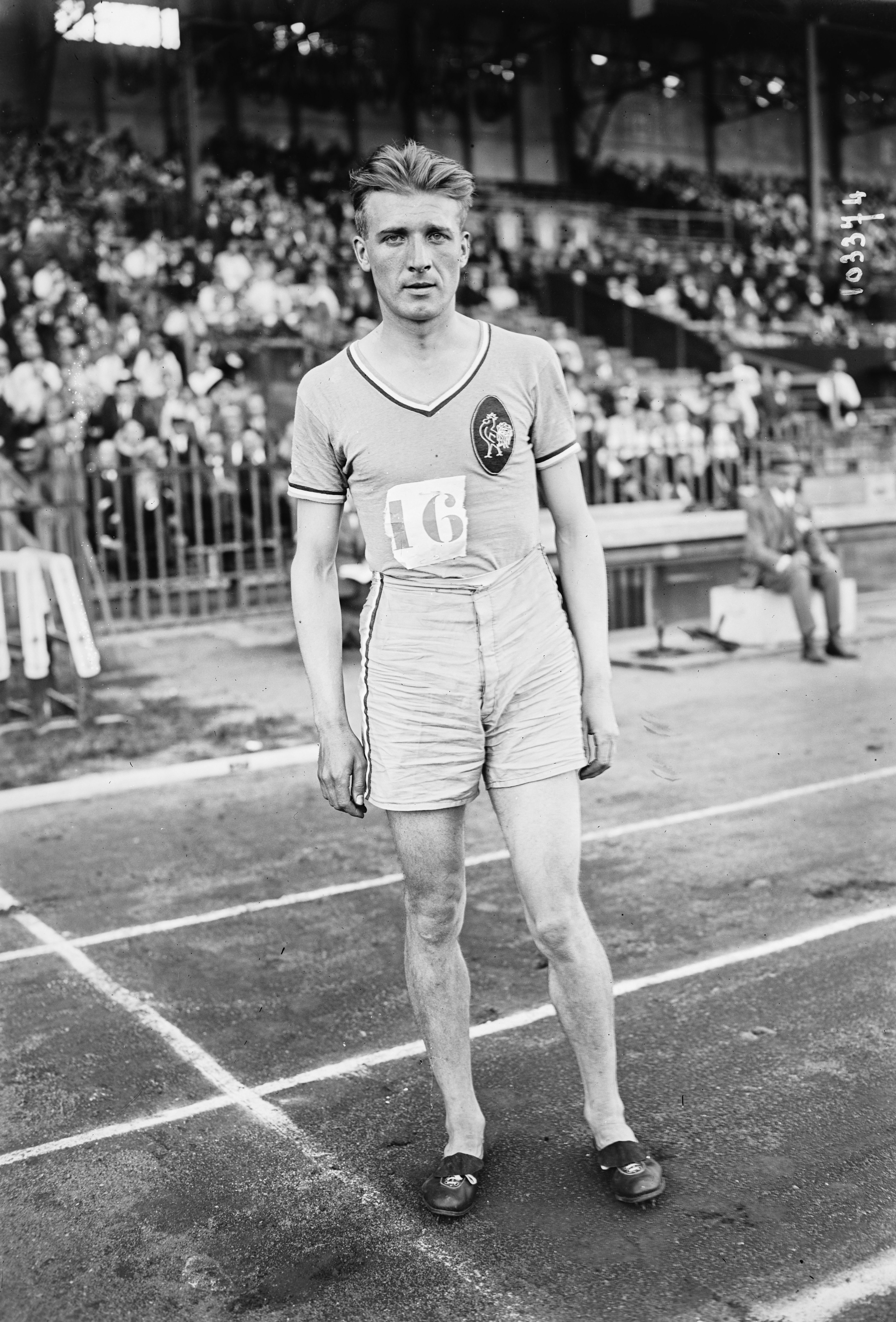

Personal information
- Full name: Roger Louis Pelé
- Nationality: French
- Born: 29 August 1901
- Died: 30 March 1982 (aged 80)

Sport
- Sport: Long-distance running
- Event: 5000 metres

Roger Louis Pelé (29 August 1901 – 30 March 1982) was a French long-distance runner. He competed in the men's 5000 metres at the 1928 Summer Olympics.
