= Pieter Gerbrands =

Dutch long-distance runner

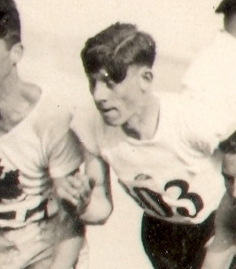
- Pieter Gerbrands in 1928

Personal information
- Full name: Pieter Gerbrands Jr.
- Nationality: Dutch
- Born: 27 April 1909
- Died: 11 November 1962 (aged 53)

Sport
- Sport: Long-distance running
- Event: 5000 metres

Pieter Gerbrands Jr. (27 April 1909 – 11 November 1962) was a Dutch long-distance runner. He competed in the men's 5000 metres at the 1928 Summer Olympics.
