= Petra Wassiluk =

German long-distance runner (born 1969)

Personal information
- Nationality: German
- Born: 27 October 1969 (age 56)

Sport
- Sport: Long-distance running
- Event: 5000 metres

Petra Wassiluk (born 27 October 1969) is a German long-distance runner. She competed in the women's 5000 metres at the 1996 Summer Olympics.
