= Armas Kinnunen =

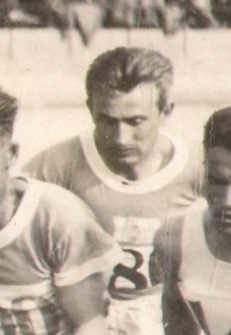
- Armas Kinnunen in 1928

Personal information
- Nationality: Finnish
- Born: 7 February 1900
- Died: 26 June 1964 (aged 64)

Sport
- Sport: Middle-distance running
- Event: 1500 metres

Armas Kinnunen (7 February 1900 – 26 June 1964) was a Finnish middle-distance runner. He competed in the men's 1500 metres at the 1928 Summer Olympics.
