= Arturo Peña =

Spanish long-distance runner

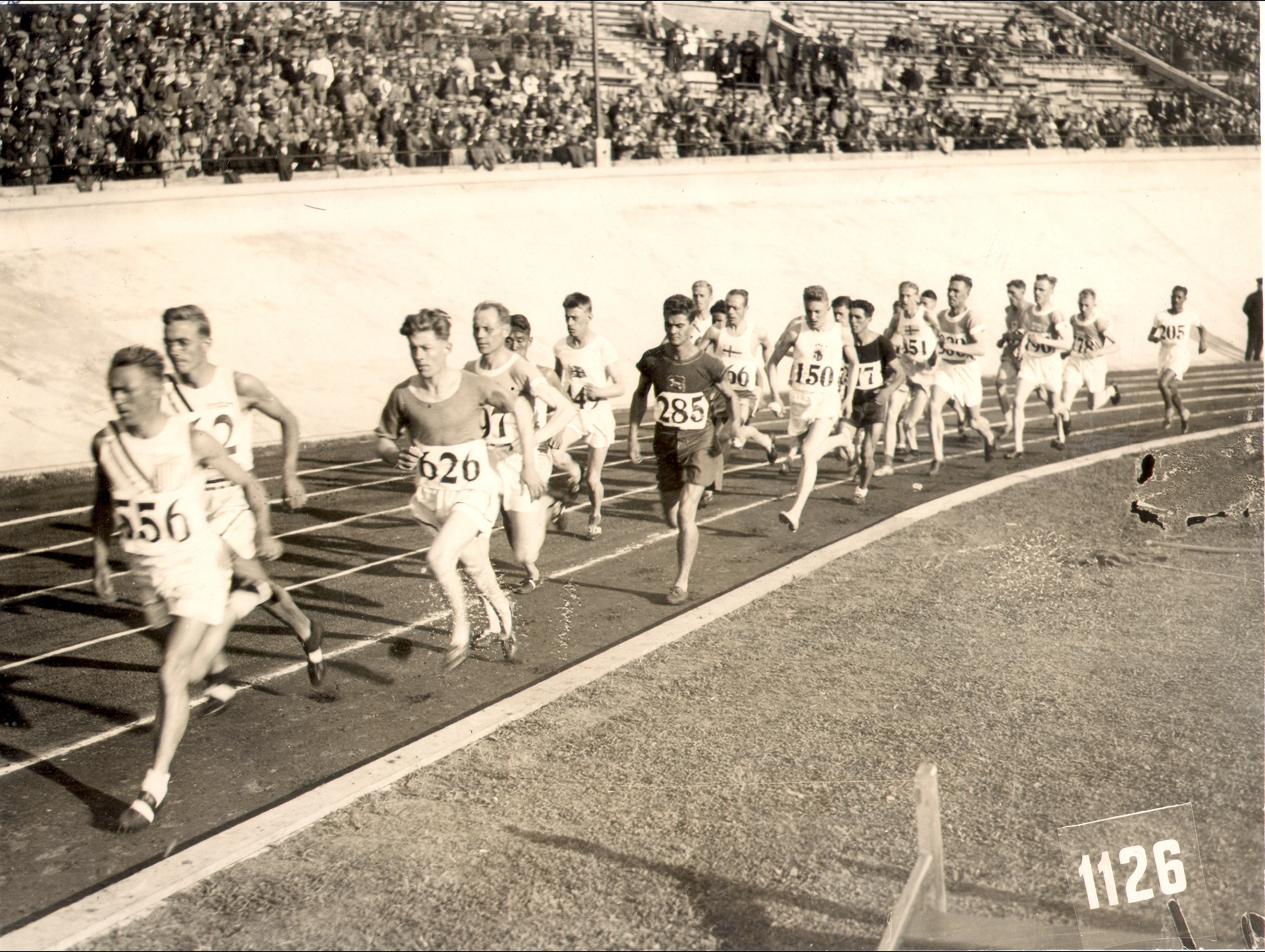
- Bib 377

Personal information
- Full name: Arturo Peña Aznar
- Nationality: Spanish
- Born: 21 November 1903
- Died: 13 December 1969 (aged 66)

Sport
- Sport: Long-distance running
- Event: 5000 metres

Arturo Peña Aznar (21 November 1903 – 13 December 1969) was a Spanish long-distance runner. He competed in the men's 5000 metres at the 1928 Summer Olympics.
