= Otto Kohn =

German long-distance runner (1907–1992)

Personal information
- Nationality: German
- Born: 16 July 1907
- Died: 9 May 1992 (aged 84)

Sport
- Sport: Long-distance running
- Event: 5000 metres

Otto Kohn (16 July 1907 – 9 May 1992) was a German long-distance runner. He competed in the men's 5000 metres at the 1928 Summer Olympics.
