= Macauley Smith =

American long-distance runner

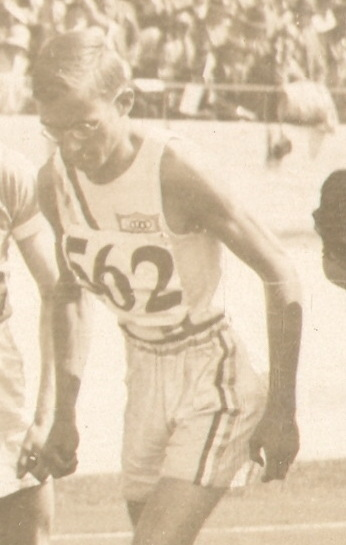
- Macauley Smith in 1928

Personal information
- Full name: John Macauley Letchworth Smith
- Nationality: American
- Born: April 10, 1905 Louisville, Kentucky, United States
- Died: August 25, 1993 (aged 88)

Sport
- Sport: Long-distance running
- Event: 5000 metres

John Macauley Letchworth Smith (April 10, 1905 – August 25, 1993) was an American long-distance runner. He competed in the men's 5000 metres at the 1928 Summer Olympics.
