= Julien Serwy =

Belgian long-distance runner

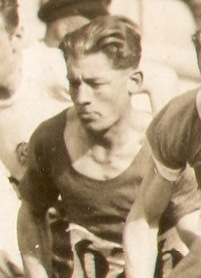
- 1928 Summer Olympics

Personal information
- Nationality: Belgian
- Born: 20 August 1906
- Died: 22 December 1964 (aged 58)

Sport
- Sport: Long-distance running
- Event: 5000 metres

Julien Serwy (20 August 1906 – 22 December 1964) was a Belgian long-distance runner. He competed in the men's 5000 metres at the 1928 Summer Olympics.
