= Wally Beavers =

English long-distance runner

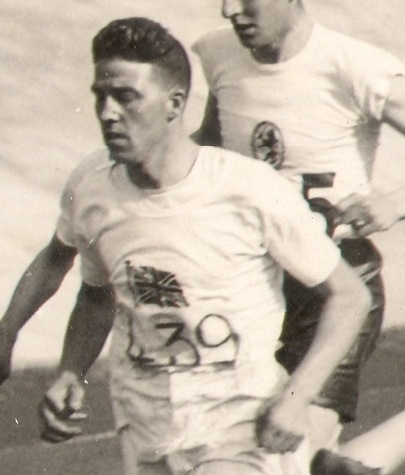
- Beavers in 1928

Personal information
- Nationality: British (English)
- Born: 11 July 1903 York, England
- Died: 29 November 1965 (aged 62) York, England
- Height: 167 cm (5 ft 6 in)
- Weight: 59 kg (130 lb)

Sport
- Sport: Athletics
- Event: middle-distance
- Club: York Harriers & Athletic Club
Medal record
Men's Athletics
Representing England
British Empire Games
| Gold medal – first place | 1934 London | 3 miles |

Walter James Beavers (11 July 1903 – 29 November 1965) was an English athlete who competed at the 1928 Summer Olympics.

== Biography ==
Beavers was born in York.

Beavers became the national 4 mile champion after winning the British AAA Championships title at the 1928 AAA Championships.

Shortly afterwards he represented Great Britain at the 1928 Olympic Games in Amsterdam, Netherlands, where he finished ninth in the 10,000 metres event. In the 5,000 metres competition he was eliminated in the first round.

Beavers retained his 4 miles title at the 1929 AAA Championships and the 1932 AAA Championships.

At the 1934 British Empire Games he won the gold medal in the 3 miles contest.
