= Nils Eklöf =

Swedish runner (1904–1987)

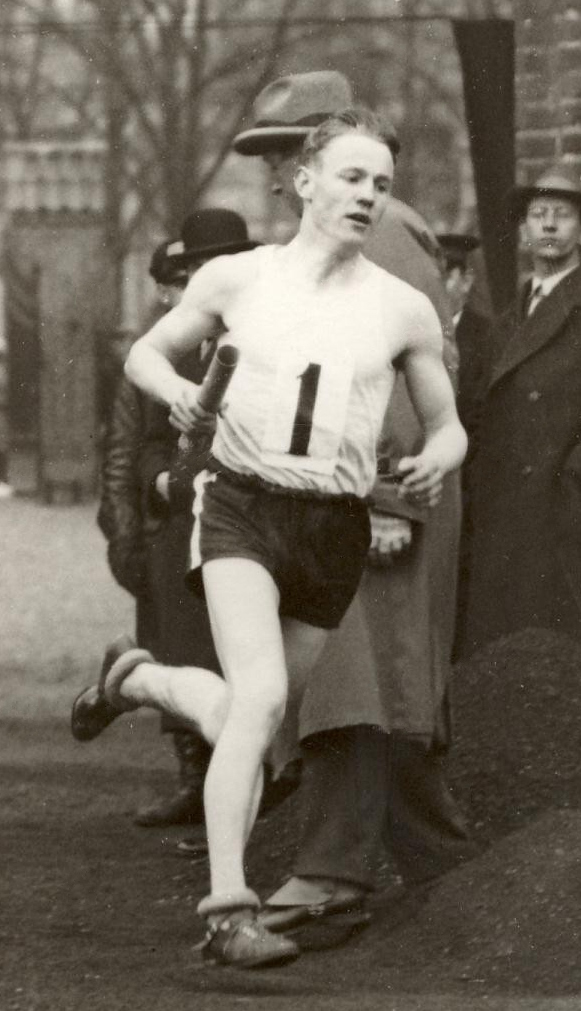

Personal information
- Born: 25 July 1904 Stockholm, Sweden
- Died: 22 December 1987 (aged 83) Arboga, Sweden
- Height: 1.72 m (5 ft 8 in)
- Weight: 58 kg (128 lb)

Sport
- Sport: Athletics
- Event(s): Steeplechase, 1500–5000 m
- Club: Fredrikshofs IF, Stockholm

Achievements and titles
- Personal best(s): 1500 m – 3:57.6 (1926); 3000 mS – 9:38.0 (1928); 5000 m – 14:45.3 (1927)

Nils Evert Eklöf (25 July 1904 – 22 December 1987) was a Swedish runner. He competed at the 1928 Summer Olympics in the 3000 m steeplechase and 5000 m events and finished fourth in the steeplechase.

Eklöf initially trained as a boxer. He changed to running in 1923, and already by 1927 was ranked first in the world over 3000 and 5000 m distances. At the 1928 Olympics he abandoned his 5000 m race, but finished fourth in the steeplechase, which he rarely ran before. After that he continued running and worked as a planning supervisor and a sports adviser.
