= Ragnar Magnusson =

Swedish long-distance runner

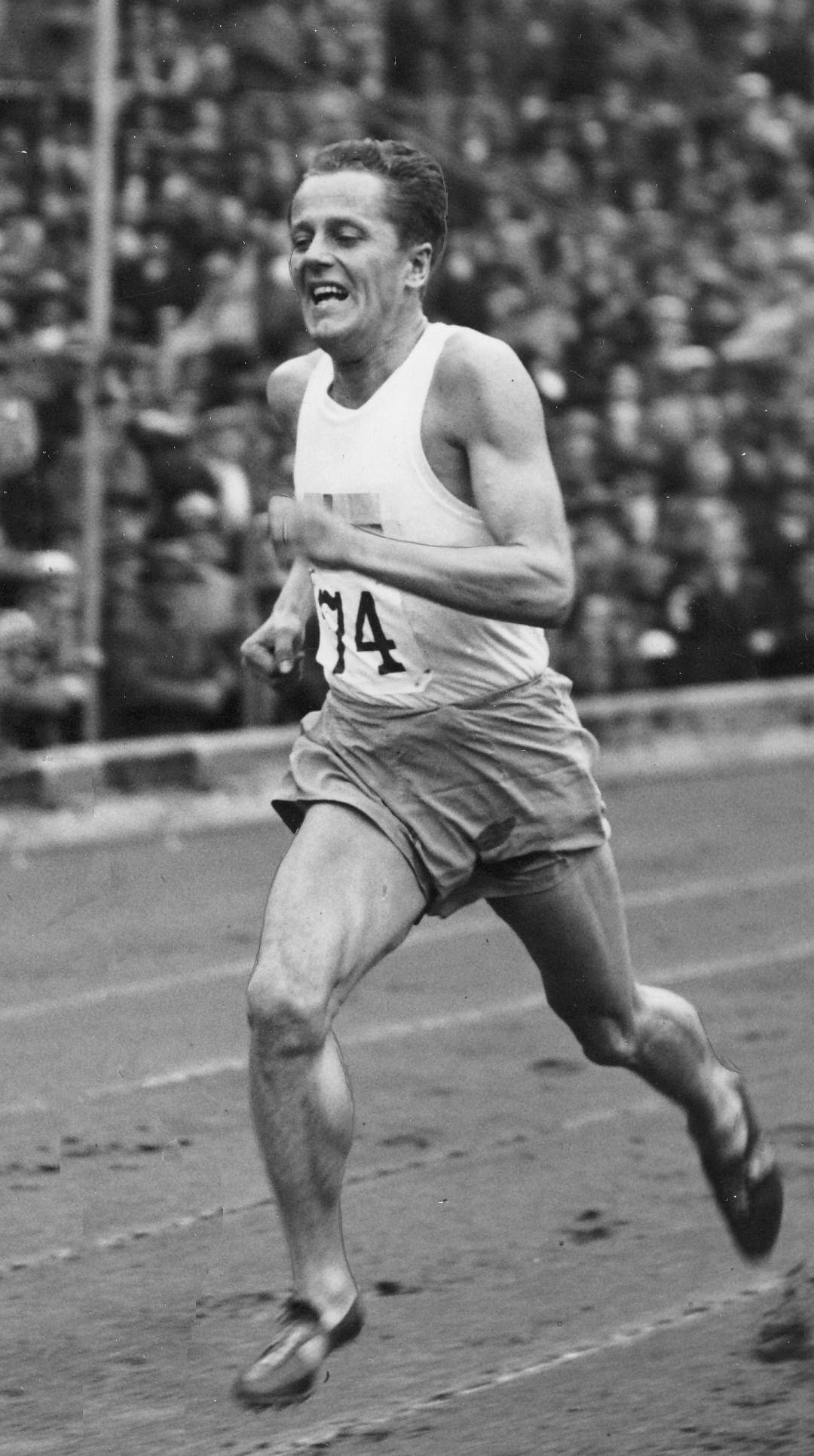
- Ragnar Magnusson in 1934

Personal information
- Born: 15 September 1901 Stockholm, Sweden
- Died: 4 March 1981 (aged 79) Johanneshov, Sweden
- Height: 1.76 m (5 ft 9 in)
- Weight: 60 kg (130 lb)

Sport
- Sport: Athletics
- Event(s): 5,000 m; 10,000 m
- Club: Fredrikshofs IF, Stockholm

Achievements and titles
- Personal best(s): 1500 m – 4:00.6 (1930); 5000 m – 14:43.8 (1933); 10000 m – 31:14.4 (1929)

Ragnar Karl Magnusson (15 September 1901 – 4 March 1981) was a Swedish long-distance runner. He competed at the 1928 Summer Olympics in the 5,000 and 10,000 m events and finished in fifth and sixth place, respectively. Magnusson held Swedish titles in the 5,000 m in 1930, 1932 and 1933 and in the 10,000 m in 1932.
