= Athletics at the 1924 Summer Olympics – Men's 1500 metres =

Men's 1500 metres at the Games of the VIII Olympiad
- Venue: Stade Olympique Yves-du-Manoir
- Dates: July 9, 1924 (semifinals); July 10, 1924 (final)
- Competitors: 40 from 22 nations
- Winning time: 3:53.6 OR

Medalists
| 1st place, gold medalist(s) | | Paavo Nurmi; Finland |
| 2nd place, silver medalist(s) | | Willy Schärer; Switzerland |
| 3rd place, bronze medalist(s) | | H. B. Stallard; Great Britain |

The men's 1500 metres event was part of the track and field athletics programme at the 1924 Summer Olympics. The competition was held on Wednesday, July 9, 1924, and on Thursday, July 10, 1924. As for all other races the track was 500 metres in circumference. Forty middle distance runners from 22 nations competed. The maximum number of athletes per nation was 4.

The event was won by Paavo Nurmi of Finland, the first of his 5 gold medals in 1924. He had previously won 3 gold medals and a silver in 1920 in longer distances and would go on to win another gold and 2 more silvers in 1928; this event would be the shortest distance at which Nurmi won a medal. He would race again in the 5000 metres less than an hour later. Nurmi's victory was Finland's first in the men's 1500 metres. Switzerland also earned its first 1500 metres medal with Willy Schärer's silver. The United States missed the podium for the first time, having taken at least bronze in each of the prior six editions of the event. H. B. Stallard's bronze gave Great Britain a medal in each of its five appearances, though the nation had not competed in the event in 1896 or 1904.

== Background ==
This was the seventh appearance of the event, which is one of 12 athletics events to have been held at every Summer Olympics. Ninth-place finisher Léon Fourneau of Belgium was the only finalist from the 1920 Games to return. Paavo Nurmi of Finland was dominant in both middle and long distances; he had broken the world record in the 1500 metres a few weeks before the Olympics.

Bulgaria, Egypt, India, Mexico, Poland, and Switzerland each made their first appearance in the event. The United States made its seventh appearance, the only nation to have competed in the men's 1500 metres at each Games to that point.

== Competition format ==
The competition consisted of two rounds, the format used since 1908. The field was larger than in 1920, moving back towards more semifinals with fewer qualifiers from each. Six semifinals were held, with anywhere between 5 and 8 runners in each. The top two runners in each heat advanced to the final, for a 12-man final race.

== Records ==
These were the standing world and Olympic records (in minutes) prior to the 1924 Summer Olympics.

| World record | Paavo Nurmi (FIN) | 3:52.6 | Helsinki, Finland | 19 June 1924 |
| Olympic record | Arnold Jackson (GBR) | 3:56.8 | Stockholm, Sweden | 10 July 1912 |

In the final Paavo Nurmi set a new Olympic record at 3:53.6.

== Schedule ==
| Date | Time | Round |
|---|---|---|
| Wednesday, 9 July 1924 | 16:00 | Semifinals |
| Thursday, 10 July 1924 | 14:45 | Final |

== Results ==
=== Semifinals ===
All semifinals were held on Wednesday, July 9, 1924.

The best two finishers of every heat qualified for the final.

==== Semifinal 1 ====
| Rank | Athlete | Nation | Time | Notes |
|---|---|---|---|---|
| 1 | René Wiriath | France | 4:13.8 | Q |
| 2 | Jaakko Luoma | Finland | 4:14.8 | Q |
| 3 | Ferdinand Friebe | Austria | 4:15.8 | |
| 4 | Mohamed El-Sayed | Egypt | Unknown | |
| 5 | István Grósz | Hungary | Unknown | |

==== Semifinal 2 ====
| Rank | Athlete | Nation | Time | Notes |
|---|---|---|---|---|
| 1 | Willy Schärer | Switzerland | 4:06.6 | Q |
| 2 | Douglas Lowe | Great Britain | 4:07.2 | Q |
| 3 | William Spencer | United States | 4:08.4 | |
| 4 | Léon Fourneau | Belgium | Unknown | |
| 5 | Pala Singh | India | Unknown | |
| — | Clifford Davis | South Africa | DNF | |

==== Semifinal 3 ====
| Rank | Athlete | Nation | Time | Notes |
|---|---|---|---|---|
| 1 | Paavo Nurmi | Finland | 4:07.6 | Q |
| 2 | Sonny Spencer | Great Britain | 4:09.0 | Q |
| 3 | Albert Larsen | Denmark | 4:11.5 | |
| 4 | René Jubeau | France | 4:14.5 | |
| 5 | Aleksander Antson | Estonia | Unknown | |
| 6 | Ferruccio Bruni | Italy | Unknown | |
| 7 | Daniel Eslava | Mexico | Unknown | |
| 8 | Józef Jaworski | Poland | 4:28.4 | |

==== Semifinal 4 ====
| Rank | Athlete | Nation | Time | Notes |
|---|---|---|---|---|
| 1 | Arvo Peussa | Finland | 4:17.4 | Q |
| 2 | Ray Watson | United States | 4:17.9 | Q |
| 3 | Disma Ferrario | Italy | 4:18.5 | |
| 4 | Jan Zeegers | Netherlands | 4:21.0 | |
| 5 | Jack Newman | Australia | Unknown | |
| 6 | Joseph Van der Wee | Belgium | Unknown | |
| 7 | Stefan Kostrzewski | Poland | 4:29.0 | |

==== Semifinal 5 ====
| Rank | Athlete | Nation | Time | Notes |
|---|---|---|---|---|
| 1 | H. B. Stallard | Great Britain | 4:11.8 | Q |
| 2 | Ray Buker | United States | 4:12.8 | Q |
| 3 | Rolph Barnes | Canada | 4:13.1 | |
| 4 | Louis Philipps | France | 4:13.4 | |
| 5 | Angelo Davoli | Italy | Unknown | |
| 6 | Lyuben Karastoyanov | Bulgaria | Unknown | |

==== Semifinal 6 ====
| Rank | Athlete | Nation | Time | Notes |
|---|---|---|---|---|
| 1 | Lloyd Hahn | United States | 4:06.8 | Q |
| 2 | Frej Liewendahl | Finland | 4:07.4 | Q |
| 3 | Cyril Ellis | Great Britain | 4:08.1 | |
| 4 | Robert Chottin | France | 4:14.8 | |
| 5 | Malcolm Boyd | Australia | Unknown | |
| 6 | Vilém Šindler | Czechoslovakia | 4:23.6 | |
| 7 | Ömer Besim Koşalay | Turkey | Unknown | |
| — | Giovanni Garaventa | Italy | DNF | |

=== Final ===
The final was held on Thursday, July 10, 1924.

Less than 45 minutes after his win in this race Nurmi started in the 5000 metre event and also won that gold medal.

| Rank | Athlete | Nation | Time | Notes |
|---|---|---|---|---|
| 1 | Paavo Nurmi | Finland | 3:53.6 | OR |
| 2 | Willy Schärer | Switzerland | 3:55.0 | |
| 3 | H. B. Stallard | Great Britain | 3:55.6 | |
| 4 | Douglas Lowe | Great Britain | 3:57.0 | |
| 5 | Ray Buker | United States | 3:58.6 | |
| 6 | Lloyd Hahn | United States | 3:59.0 | |
| 7 | Ray Watson | United States | 4:00.0 | |
| 8 | Frej Liewendahl | Finland | 4:00.3 | |
| 9 | Arvo Peussa | Finland | 4:00.6 | |
| 10 | René Wiriath | France | 4:02.8 | |
| 11 | Sonny Spencer | Great Britain | 4:03.7 | |
| 12 | Jaakko Luoma | Finland | 4:03.9 | |
