= Athletics at the 1928 Summer Olympics – Men's 800 metres =

Men's 800 metres at the Games of the IX Olympiad
- Venue: Olympic Stadium
- Dates: July 29, 1928 (heats); July 30, 1928 (semifinals); July 31, 1928 (final)
- Competitors: 49 from 24 nations
- Winning time: 1:51.8 OR

Medalists
1st place, gold medalist(s)		Douglas Lowe	Great Britain
2nd place, silver medalist(s)		Erik Byléhn	Sweden
3rd place, bronze medalist(s)		Hermann Engelhard	Germany

Video on YouTube Official Video

The men's 800 metre event at the 1928 Olympic Games took place between July 29 & July 31. Forty-nine athletes from 24 nations competed. NOCs were limited to 4 competitors each.

The event was won by Douglas Lowe of Great Britain, successfully defending his 1924 championship (the first man to do so in the 800 metres). It was the third of what ultimately would be four straight British victories in the event, and the fourth overall title for Great Britain in the 800 metres. Erik Byléhn's silver was Sweden's first 800 metres medal. Hermann Engelhard matched Germany's best-ever result in the event (Germany had previously won bronze in 1908).

== Background ==
This was the eighth appearance of the event, which is one of 12 athletics events to have been held at every Summer Olympics. Three finalists from 1924 returned: gold medalist Douglas Lowe of Great Britain, silver medalist Paul Martin of Switzerland, and ninth-place finisher Harry Houghton of Great Britain. The competitive field was led by Lowe (defending champion and 1928 AAA winner), Otto Peltzer of Germany (880 yard world record holder), Séra Martin of France (800 metres world record holder), and Lloyd Hahn of the United States (1928 AAU champion, who had broken the world record at the U.S. Olympic trials a few days before Séra Martin ran even faster; Hahn's record was never ratified).

Argentina and India appeared in the event for the first time. Great Britain and the United States each made their seventh appearance, tied for the most among all nations.

== Competition format ==
The competition used the three-round format introduced in 1912, with the nine-man final introduced in 1920. There were eight first-round heats of between 4 and 7 athletes each; the top three runners in each heat advanced to the semifinals. There were three semifinals with 8 athletes each; the top three runners in each semifinal advanced to the nine-man final.

== Records ==
These were the standing world and Olympic records (in minutes) prior to the 1928 Summer Olympics.

World record	Séra Martin (FRA)	1:50.6	Paris, France	14 July 1928
Olympic record	Ted Meredith (USA)	1:51.9	Stockholm, Sweden	8 July 1912

Douglas Lowe broke the Olympic record by 0.1 seconds in the final, setting the new record at 1:51.8.

== Schedule ==
Date	Time	Round
Sunday, 29 July 1928	16:15	Round 1
Monday, 30 July 1928	15:25	Semifinals
Tuesday, 31 July 1928	16:20	Final

== Results ==
=== Round 1 ===
The first three finishers in each of the eight heats advanced to the semifinal round.

==== Heat 1 ====
Rank	Athlete	Nation	Time	Notes
1	Alex Wilson	Canada	1:59.2	Q
2	Erik Byléhn	Sweden	1:59.8	Q
3	John Sittig	United States	2:00.6	Q
4	Guus Zeegers	Netherlands	Unknown	
5	Gérald Bertheloot	Belgium	Unknown	
6	Vasilios Stavrinos	Greece	Unknown	
7	Louis Schmit	Luxembourg	Unknown	
—	António Dias	Portugal	DNS	

==== Heat 2 ====
Rank	Athlete	Nation	Time	Notes
1	Otto Peltzer	Germany	1:57.4	Q
2	Brant Little	Canada	1:57.8	Q
3	Wilfred Tatham	Great Britain	1:58.2	Q
4	Adriaan Paulen	Netherlands	Unknown	
5	William Whyte	Australia	Unknown	
6	Albert Larsen	Denmark	Unknown	
—	József Marton	Hungary	DNS	

==== Heat 3 ====
Rank	Athlete	Nation	Time	Notes
1	Jean Keller	France	1:59.0	Q
2	Paul Martin	Switzerland	1:59.4	Q
3	Ray Watson	United States	1:59.6	Q
4	Max Tarnogrocki	Germany	1:59.9	
5	Alfonso García	Mexico	Unknown	
6	Andries Hoogerwerf	Netherlands	Unknown	
7	Antonios Mangos	Greece	Unknown	
—	Harri Larva	Finland	DNS	

==== Heat 4 ====
Rank	Athlete	Nation	Time	Notes
1	Georges Baraton	France	2:03.4	Q
2	Earl Fuller	United States	2:03.8	Q
3	Olaf Strand	Norway	2:03.8	Q
4	Ettore Tavernari	Italy	Unknown	
5	Philippe Coenjaerts	Belgium	Unknown	
6	Harry Houghton	Great Britain	Unknown	
—	Danie Jacobs	South Africa	DNS	

==== Heat 5 ====
Rank	Athlete	Nation	Time	Notes
1	Lloyd Hahn	United States	1:56.8	Q
2	Hermann Englehard	Germany	1:57.0	Q
3	Vilém Šindler	Czechoslovakia	1:57.0	Q
4	René Féger	France	Unknown	
5	Jack Walter	Canada	Unknown	
6	Charles Stuart	Australia	Unknown	
—	Grigorios Georgakopoulos	Greece	DNS	
—	Matti Korpela	Finland	DNS	

==== Heat 6 ====
Rank	Athlete	Nation	Time	Notes
1	Serafín Dengra	Argentina	2:01.2	Q
2	Douglas Lowe	Great Britain	2:02.2	Q
3	Guido Cominotto	Italy	2:02.4	Q
4	Ömer Besim Koşalay	Turkey	Unknown	
—	G. Arnoldy	Luxembourg	DNS	
—	Frej Liewendahl	Finland	DNS	
—	László Magdics	Hungary	DNS	

==== Heat 7 ====
Rank	Athlete	Nation	Time	Notes
1	Séra Martin	France	1:58.8	Q
2	László Barsi	Hungary	1:59.0	Q
3	Fredy Müller	Germany	1:59.4	Q
4	Adolf Kittel	Czechoslovakia	1:59.6	
5	Feliks Malanowski	Poland	1:59.8	
6	Gerry Coughlan	Ireland	Unknown	
7	J. Murphy	India	Unknown	
—	Eino Purje	Finland	DNS	

==== Heat 8 ====
Rank	Athlete	Nation	Time	Notes
1	Phil Edwards	Canada	1:59.4	Q
2	Ralph Starr	Great Britain	1:59.8	Q
3	Norman McEachern	Ireland	1:59.8	Q
4	Leopoldo Ledesma	Argentina	Unknown	
5	José Lucílo Iturbe	Mexico	Unknown	
6	Joaquín Miquel	Spain	2:03.2	
—	L. Passy	Greece	DNS	
—	Ivan Rittig	Yugoslavia	DNS	

=== Semifinals ===
The three fastest runners from each of the three heats advanced to the final.

==== Semifinal 1 ====
Rank	Athlete	Nation	Time	Notes
1	Earl Fuller	United States	1:55.6	Q
2	Douglas Lowe	Great Britain	1:55.8	Q
3	Jean Keller	France	1:56.0	Q
4	László Barsi	Hungary	1:56.2	
5	Otto Peltzer	Germany	1:56.3	
6	Alex Wilson	Canada	1:57.1	
7	Vilém Šindler	Czechoslovakia	Unknown	
—	Norman McEachern	Ireland	DNF	

==== Semifinal 2 ====
Rank	Athlete	Nation	Time	Notes
1	Erik Byléhn	Sweden	1:55.6	Q
2	Ray Watson	United States	1:56.8	Q
3	Hermann Engelhard	Germany	1:56.8	Q
4	Brant Little	Canada	1:57.6	
5	Ralph Starr	Great Britain	Unknown	
6	Guido Cominotto	Italy	Unknown	
7	Serafín Dengra	Argentina	Unknown	
—	Georges Baraton	France	DNS	

==== Semifinal 3 ====
Rank	Athlete	Nation	Time	Notes
1	Lloyd Hahn	United States	1:52.6	Q
2	Phil Edwards	Canada	1:52.8	Q
3	Séra Martin	France	1:53.0	Q
4	Paul Martin	Switzerland	1:53.3	
5	John Sittig	United States	1:53.4	
6	Fredy Müller	Germany	1:53.8	
7	Wilfrid Tatham	Great Britain	Unknown	
8	Olaf Strand	Norway	1:59.9	

=== Final ===
Rank	Athlete	Nation	Time	Notes
1st place, gold medalist(s)	Douglas Lowe	Great Britain	1:51.8	OR
2nd place, silver medalist(s)	Erik Byléhn	Sweden	1:52.8	
3rd place, bronze medalist(s)	Hermann Engelhard	Germany	1:53.2	
4	Phil Edwards	Canada	1:54.0	
5	Lloyd Hahn	United States	1:54.2	
6	Séra Martin	France	1:54.6	
7	Earl Fuller	United States	1:55.0	
8	Jean Keller	France	1:57.0	
9	Ray Watson	United States	2:03.0	
