= Athletics at the 1924 Summer Olympics – Men's 800 metres =

Men's 800 metres at the Games of the VIII Olympiad
- Venue: Stade Olympique Yves-du-Manoir
- Dates: July 6, 1924 (quarterfinals); July 7, 1924 (semifinals and final)
- Competitors: 50 from 24 nations
- Winning time: 1:52.4

Medalists
1st place, gold medalist(s)		Douglas Lowe; Great Britain
2nd place, silver medalist(s)		Paul Martin; Switzerland
3rd place, bronze medalist(s)		Schuyler Enck; United States

Official Video Highlights

The men's 800 metres event was part of the track and field athletics programme at the 1924 Summer Olympics. The competition was held from Sunday, July 6, 1924, to Tuesday, July 8, 1924. As with all other races the track was 500 metres in circumference. Fifty middle distance runners from 24 nations competed.

The event was won by Douglas Lowe of Great Britain. It was the second of four consecutive British victories in the event, and the third overall 800 metres title for Great Britain. Lowe would successfully defend his title four years later, the first man to repeat in the 800 metres. Paul Martin's silver was Switzerland's first medal in the 800 metres.

== Background ==
This was the seventh appearance of the event, which is one of 12 athletics events to have been held at every Summer Olympics. Two finalists from 1920 returned: fourth-place finisher Edgar Mountain of Great Britain and seventh-place finisher Adriaan Paulen of the Netherlands. The favorites for 1924 were Schuyler Enck of the United States (who had the best time in 1924 with 1:53.2), H. B. Stallard of Great Britain (AAA champion), and Paul Martin of Switzerland.

Austria, Brazil, Haiti, Ireland, Mexico, and Poland appeared in the event for the first time. Great Britain and the United States each made their sixth appearance, tied for the most among all nations.

== Competition format ==
The competition used the three-round format introduced in 1912, with the nine-man final introduced in 1920. There were eight first-round heats of between 4 and 7 athletes each; the top three runners in each heat advanced to the semifinals. There were three semifinals with 8 athletes each; the top three runners in each semifinal advanced to the nine-man final.

== Records ==
These were the standing world and Olympic records (in minutes) prior to the 1924 Summer Olympics.

World record	Ted Meredith (USA)	1:51.9	Stockholm, Sweden	8 July 1912
Olympic record	Ted Meredith (USA)	1:51.9	Stockholm, Sweden	8 July 1912

No world or Olympic records were set during the competition.

== Schedule ==
The rounds were each on separate days again, following a one-time experiment with the semifinals and final being held one after the other in 1920.

Date	Time	Round
Sunday, 6 July 1924	15:15	Round 1
Monday, 7 July 1924	15:30	Semifinals
Tuesday, 8 July 1924	15:15	Final

== Results ==
=== Round 1 ===
All heats were held on Sunday, July 6, 1924.

The best three finishers of every heat qualified for the semi-finals.

==== Heat 1 ====
Rank	Athlete	Nation	Time	Notes
1	René Wiriath	France	1:59.0	Q
2	Bill Richardson	United States	1:59.6	Q
3	Gösta Jansson	Finland	1:59.9	Q
4	Charles Davis	South Africa	Unknown	
5	Ludwig Deckardt	Austria	Unknown	
6	Vilém Šindler	Czechoslovakia	Unknown	
7	Édouard Armand	Haiti	Unknown	

==== Heat 2 ====
Rank	Athlete	Nation	Time	Notes
1	Clarence Oldfield	South Africa	1:58.0	Q
2	Harry Houghton	Great Britain	1:58.4	Q
3	Schuyler Enck	United States	1:58.6	Q
4	Maurice Grosclaude	France	Unknown	
5	Mario-Giuseppe Bonini	Italy	Unknown	
6	Eduard Riedl	Czechoslovakia	2:02.5	
7	Juan Escutia	Mexico	Unknown	

==== Heat 3 ====
Rank	Athlete	Nation	Time	Notes
1	Paul Martin	Switzerland	2:00.2	Q
2	Sven Emil Lundgren	Sweden	2:01.4	Q
3	Jack Harris	Canada	2:01.6	Q
4	Malcolm Boyd	Australia	Unknown	

==== Heat 4 ====
Rank	Athlete	Nation	Time	Notes
1	Adriaan Paulen	Netherlands	1:59.2	Q
2	John Watters	United States	1:59.8	Q
3	Tom McKay	Canada	2:00.1	Q
4	Puccio Pucci	Italy	Unknown	
5	Roy Norman	Australia	Unknown	
6	Narciso Costa	Brazil	Unknown	
—	Józef Jaworski	Poland	DNF	

==== Heat 5 ====
Rank	Athlete	Nation	Time	Notes
1	Rudolf Johansson	Sweden	1:57.6	Q
2	François Morren	Belgium	Unknown	Q
3	Edgar Mountain	Great Britain	Unknown	Q
4	Ferruccio Bruni	Italy	Unknown	
5	Hec Phillips	Canada	Unknown	
6	Stefan Ołdak	Poland	2:09.0	
—	Wim Bolten	Netherlands	DNF	

==== Heat 6 ====
Rank	Athlete	Nation	Time	Notes
1	Kai Jensen	Denmark	1:58.4	Q
2	Norman McEachern	Ireland	Unknown	Q
3	Ray Dodge	United States	Unknown	Q
4	Stefan Kostrzewski	Poland	2:01.6	
5	Menso Johannes Menso	Netherlands	Unknown	
6	Christophe Mirgain	Luxembourg	2:05.2	
7	Jack Newman	Australia	Unknown	

==== Heat 7 ====
Rank	Athlete	Nation	Time	Notes
1	H. B. Stallard	Great Britain	1:57.6	Q
2	Louis Philipps	France	1:58.6	Q
3	Albert Larsen	Denmark	1:58.8	Q
4	Tokushige Noto	Japan	Unknown	
5	Erik Byléhn	Sweden	Unknown	
6	Ömer Besim Koşalay	Turkey	Unknown	

==== Heat 8 ====
Rank	Athlete	Nation	Time	Notes
1	Douglas Lowe	Great Britain	1:58.0	Q
2	Georges Baraton	France	1:59.2	Q
3	Charles Hoff	Norway	2:02.1	Q
4	Karel Přibyl	Czechoslovakia	2:03.8	
5	Guillermo Amparan	Mexico	Unknown	

=== Semifinals ===
All semi-finals were held on Monday, July 7, 1924.

The best three finishers of every heat qualified for the final.

==== Semifinal 1 ====
Rank	Athlete	Nation	Time	Notes
1	H. B. Stallard	Great Britain	1:54.2	Q
2	Bill Richardson	United States	1:55.0	Q
3	Paul Martin	Switzerland	1:55.6	Q
4	Rudolf Johansson	Sweden	1:55.7	
5	Kai Jensen	Denmark	Unknown	
6	Clarence Oldfield	South Africa	Unknown	
7	Georges Baraton	France	1:57.6	
8	Tom McKay	Canada	1:58.5	

==== Semifinal 2 ====
Rank	Athlete	Nation	Time	Notes
1	Douglas Lowe	Great Britain	1:56.8	Q
2	Harry Houghton	Great Britain	1:57.3	Q
3	John Watters	United States	1:57.4	Q
4	Sven Emil Lundgren	Sweden	1:57.6	
5	Norman McEachern	Ireland	1:58.3	
6	François Morren	Belgium	1:58.5	
7	René Wiriath	France	1:59.6	
8	Albert Larsen	Denmark	2:00.2	

==== Semifinal 3 ====
Rank	Athlete	Nation	Time	Notes
1	Ray Dodge	United States	1:57.0	Q
2	Schuyler Enck	United States	1:57.6	Q
3	Charles Hoff	Norway	1:58.4	Q
4	Adriaan Paulen	Netherlands	1:58.8	
5	Gösta Jansson	Finland	1:59.4	
6	Jack Harris	Canada	Unknown	
7	Edgar Mountain	Great Britain	Unknown	
8	Louis Philipps	France	Unknown	

=== Final ===
The final was held on Tuesday, July 8, 1924.

Rank	Athlete	Nation	Time
1st place, gold medalist(s)	Douglas Lowe	Great Britain	1:52.4
2nd place, silver medalist(s)	Paul Martin	Switzerland	1:52.6
3rd place, bronze medalist(s)	Schuyler Enck	United States	1:53.0
4	H. B. Stallard	Great Britain	1:53.0
5	Bill Richardson	United States	1:53.8
6	Ray Dodge	United States	1:54.2
7	John Watters	United States	1:54.8
8	Charles Hoff	Norway	1:56.7
9	Harry Houghton	Great Britain	1:58.0
