= 1928 Summer Student World Championships =

Multi-sport event in Paris, France

Official poster

The 1928 Summer Student World Championships, was the fourth editions of the Summer Student World Championships, were organised by the Confederation Internationale des Etudiants (CIE) and held in Paris, France. Held from 9–17 August, a total of 300 athletes from 16 nations competed in the programme of five sports, including: athletics, fencing, association football, swimming and tennis. Women competed in swimming events only.

== Athletics medal summary ==
Event	Gold		Silver		Bronze	
100 metres	André Théard (HAI)	10.6	Hans Salz (GER)	10.8e	Eugen Eldracher (GER)	10.9e
200 metres	John Rinkel (ENG)	22.2	Eugen Eldracher (GER)	22.8e	Georges Krotoff (FRA)	Unknown
400 metres	Werner Storz (GER)	49.2	Joseph Jackson (FRA)	50.6e	László Magdics (HUN)	Unknown
800 metres	Paul Martin (SUI)	01:57.6	Fredy Müller (GER)	1:58.4e	Francis Galtier (FRA)	1:58.6e
1500 metres	Helmut Krause (GER)	04:01.6	Reidar Jørgensen (NOR)	4:01.7e	Gaston Leduc (FRA)	4:02.4e
3000 metres	Gaston Leduc (FRA)	08:58.4	David Richards (ENG)	9:02.6e	Elek Szerb (HUN)	9:08.6e
110 metres hurdles	Bernard Lucas (ENG)	15.6	Gabriel Sempé (FRA)	15.7e	Robert Marchand (FRA)	15.8e
400 metres hurdles	Robert Maxwell (USA)	55.4	Stefan Kostrzewski (POL)	56.0e	Édouard Max-Robert (FRA)	Unknown
4 × 100 metres relay	Germany (GER); Hans Salz; Eugen Eldracher; Kurt Mölle; Robert Suhr	42.8	Japan (JPN)	43.2	France (FRA); Georges Krotoff; Gabriel Sempé; Jacques Arnaud; Charles Heutschell	44.8
4 × 400 metres relay	France (FRA); Joseph Jackson; Georges Krotoff; Francis Galtier; Marcel Keller	3:22.8	Germany (GER)	3:24.8	Hungary (HUN); Imre Dénes; Ödön Ferenczy; Lajos Remetz; László Magdics	3:25.0
1000 metres medley relay	Germany (GER); Harry Storz; Hans Salz; Eugen Eldracher; Peter-Paul Wiese	2:01.2	France (FRA); Joseph Jackson; Georges Krotoff; Édouard Max-Robert; Francis Galtier	2:01.6	Hungary (HUN); László Magdics; Ferenc Abonyi; János Paizs; Elemér Veress	2:02.0
High jump	Kazuo Kimura (JPN)	1.88	Wilhelm Ladewig (GER)	1.85	Giuseppe Palmieri (ITA)	1.80
Pole vault	Hiroshi Kasahara (JPN)	3.80	Shuhei Nishida (JPN)	3.70	Jan Koreis (TCH)	3.60
Long jump	Willi Meier (GER)	7.34	Chuhei Nambu (JPN)	7.18	Lajos Balogh (HUN)	7.13
Shot put	Édouard Duhour (FRA)	14.60	Antal Bacsalmasi (HUN)	13.90	Václav Chmelík (TCH)	13.41
Discus throw	István Komlos (HUN)	40.28	Kurt Weiss (GER)	39.35	István Regos (HUN)	39.10
Javelin throw	Kosaku Sumiyoshi (JPN)	62.81	Hans Schnackerts (GER)	58.48?	Giuseppe Palmieri (ITA)	57.72
Pentathlon	Wilhelm Beck (AUT)	3460.60	Wilhelm Ladewig (GER)	3457.69	Jacques Flouret (FRA)	3300.98

== Athletics medal table ==
1	Germany (GER)	4	8	1	13
2	France (FRA)	3	3	6	12
3	Japan (JPN)	3	2	0	5
4	England (ENG)	2	1	0	3
5	Hungary (HUN)	1	1	6	8
6	Austria (AUT)	1	0	0	1
7	Switzerland (SUI)	1	0	0	1
8	United States (USA)	1	0	0	1
9	Norway (NOR)	0	1	0	1
10	Poland (POL)	0	1	0	1
11	Italy (ITA)	0	0	2	2
12	Czechoslovakia (TCH)	0	0	2	2
Total		16	17	17	50

== Participating nations ==
- Austria
- Belgium
- Czechoslovakia
- France
- Germany
- Great Britain
- Haiti
- Hungary
- Italy
- Japan
- Norway
- Poland
- Sweden
- Switzerland
- United States
- Kingdom of Yugoslavia

== See also ==
- FISU World University Games § Precursors
- University and college sport
