= 1927 Summer Student World Championships =

Multi-sport event in Rome, Italy

The 1927 Summer Student World Championships, the third edition of the Summer Student World Championships, were organised by the Confederation Internationale des Etudiants (CIE) and held in Rome, Italy. Held from 28 August to 4 September, 269 athletes from 15 nations competed in the sports programme including athletics, fencing, association football, swimming and tennis. Women's events were introduced for the first time, but in swimming only.

== Athletics medal summary ==
Event	Gold		Silver		Bronze	
100 metres	André Théard (HAI)	10.6	Elemér Veress (HUN)	11.0	János Paitz (HUN)	11.0
200 metres	János Paitz (HUN)	22.4	Georges Krotoff (FRA)	22.8	Kazimierz Kasperkiewicz (POL)	22.8
400 metres	Paul Martin (SUI)	50.6	Joseph Jackson (FRA)	52.2	László Magdics (HUN)	52.6
800 metres	Paul Martin (SUI)	1:57.6	René Wiriath (FRA)	1:58.8	Lajos Remetz (HUN)	2:01.0
1500 metres	René Wiriath (FRA)	4:05.0	Paul Martin (SUI)	4:06.6	Euclide Svampa (ITA)	4:14.6
3000 metres	Józef Jaworski (POL)	9:20.4	John Bell (USA)	9:28.0	Josef Hron (TCH)	9:33.4
110 metres hurdles	Gabriel Sempé (FRA)	15.2	Wojciech Trojanowski (POL)	16.0	Stefan Kostrzewski (POL)	16.2
4×100 metres relay	(Hungary) Hungary; Ferenc Orbán; János Paizs; Elemér Veress; Károly Ottováy	44.4	(France) France; Géo André; Jacques Flouret; Georges Krotoff; Gabriel Sempé	44.6	(Italy) Italy; Alberto D'Agostino; Renato Alessandri; Manlio Gelsomini; Aldo Colussi	45.0
4×400 metres relay	(France) France; Joseph Jackson; René Wiriath; Georges Pontvianne; Marcel Keller	3:28.4	(Hungary) Hungary; Károly Ottováy; Ödön Ferenczy; Lajos Remetz; Endre Sandor	3:30.4	(Poland) Poland; Zygmunt Weiss; Józef Korolkiewicz; Józef de Virion; Stefan Kostrzewski	3:31.2
1000 metres medley relay	(Hungary) Hungary; János Paizs; Elemér Veress; Károly Ottováy; Ödön Ferenczy	2:01.2	(France) France; Géo André; Georges Krotoff; René Wiriath; Émile Mattei	2:02.8	(Czechoslovakia) Czechoslovakia; Karel Kněnický; Jan Holub; Emanuel Černý; Ladislav Dostál	2:03.0
High jump	Ferenc Orbán (HUN)	1.86	József Tass (HUN)	1.83	Fernand Aupinel (FRA)	1.83
Pole vault	Raimund Held (AUT)	3.60	István Király (HUN)	3.50	Artur Reisner (EST)	3.40
Long jump	Virgilio Tommasi (ITA)	7.03	József Tass (HUN)	6.78	Elemér Veress (HUN)	6.73
Shot put	Antal Bacsalmasi (HUN)	14.22	Hugo Vītols (LAT)	13.70	Nikolai Feldmann (EST)	13.18
Discus throw	Jan Beneš (TCH)	39.73	Pál Tóth (HUN)	38.63	Wilhelm Schwartzinger (AUT)	38.48
Javelin throw	Johannes Schutz (EST)	51.85	Jacques Flouret (FRA)	51.35	Agop Taxgian (ITA)	50.27
Pentathlon	Ludovico Paternò (ITA)	3145.68	Jacques Flouret (FRA)	3135.77	Gustavo Baracchi (ITA)	2987.36

== Athletics medal table ==
Rank	Nation	Gold	Silver	Bronze	Total
1	Hungary (HUN)	4	6	4	14
2	France (FRA)	3	6	1	10
3	Switzerland (SUI)	2	1	0	3
4	Italy (ITA)	2	0	3	5
5	Poland (POL)	1	1	3	5
6	Estonia (EST)	1	0	2	3
7	Austria (AUT)	1	0	1	2
7	Czechoslovakia (TCH)	1	0	1	2
9	Latvia (LAT)	0	1	0	1
9	United States (USA)	0	1	0	1
Totals (10 entries)		15	16	15	46

== Participating nations ==
- Austria
- Belgium
- Czechoslovakia
- Denmark
- Estonia
- France
- Greece
- Haiti
- Hungary
- Italy
- Latvia
- Poland
- Soviet Union
- South Africa
- Switzerland
- United States

== See also ==
- FISU World University Games § Precursors
- University and college sport
