= The Fighting Rookie =

- Theatrical release poster
- Directed by: Spencer Gordon Bennet
- Screenplay by: George Morgan
- Story by: Homer King Gordon
- Produced by: Spencer Gordon Bennet; Lester F. Scott Jr.
- Starring: Jack La Rue; Ada Ince; DeWitt Jennings; Matthew Betz; Arthur Belasco; Tom Brower
- Cinematography: James S. Brown Jr.
- Edited by: Fred Bain
- Production company: Mayfair Pictures
- Distributed by: Mayfair Pictures
- Release date: May 15, 1934
- Running time: 67 minutes
- Country: United States
- Language: English

The Fighting Rookie is a 1934 American crime film directed by Spencer Gordon Bennet and written by George Morgan. The film stars Jack La Rue, Ada Ince, DeWitt Jennings, Matthew Betz, Arthur Belasco and Tom Brower. The film was released on May 15, 1934, by Mayfair Pictures.

== Cast ==
- Jack La Rue as Jim Trent
- Ada Ince as Molly Malone
- DeWitt Jennings as Police Commissioner
- Matthew Betz as Lewis Cantor
- Arthur Belasco as Bates
- Tom Brower as Tom Malone
