= Friebe =

Friebe is a surname. Notable people with the surname include:

- Adolf Tortilowicz von Batocki-Friebe (1868–1944), German noble, lawyer and politician
- Ferdinand Friebe (1894–1980), Austrian middle-distance runner
- Helmut Friebe (1894–1970), German general
- Percy Friebe (born 1931), Scottish rugby union player
- Werner Friebe (1897–1962), German general
