= Louis Schmit =

Luxembourgish middle-distance runner

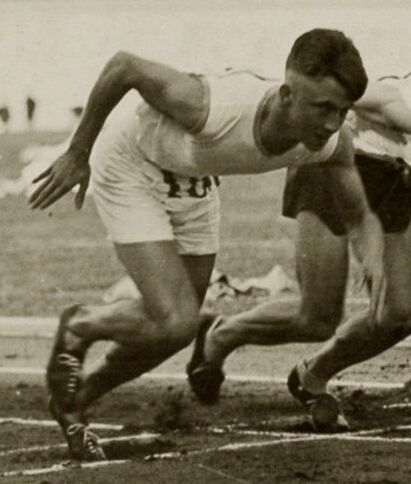
- Louis Schmit in 1928

Personal information
- Nationality: Luxembourgish
- Born: 18 February 1908 Luxembourg City, Luxembourg
- Died: 25 November 2002 (aged 94)

Sport
- Sport: Middle-distance running
- Event: 800 metres

Louis Schmit (18 February 1908 – 25 November 2002) was a Luxembourgish middle-distance runner. He competed in the men's 800 metres at the 1928 Summer Olympics.
