= Tom McKay (runner) =

Canadian middle-distance runner

Personal information
- Nationality: Canadian
- Born: 28 July 1900 Lucan, Ireland
- Died: 3 April 1978 (aged 77) Toronto, Ontario, Canada

Sport
- Sport: Middle-distance running
- Event: 800 metres

Thomas Parish McKay (28 July 1900 – 3 April 1978) was a Canadian middle-distance runner. He competed in the men's 800 metres at the 1924 Summer Olympics.
