= Frontier Days (film) =

1934 film

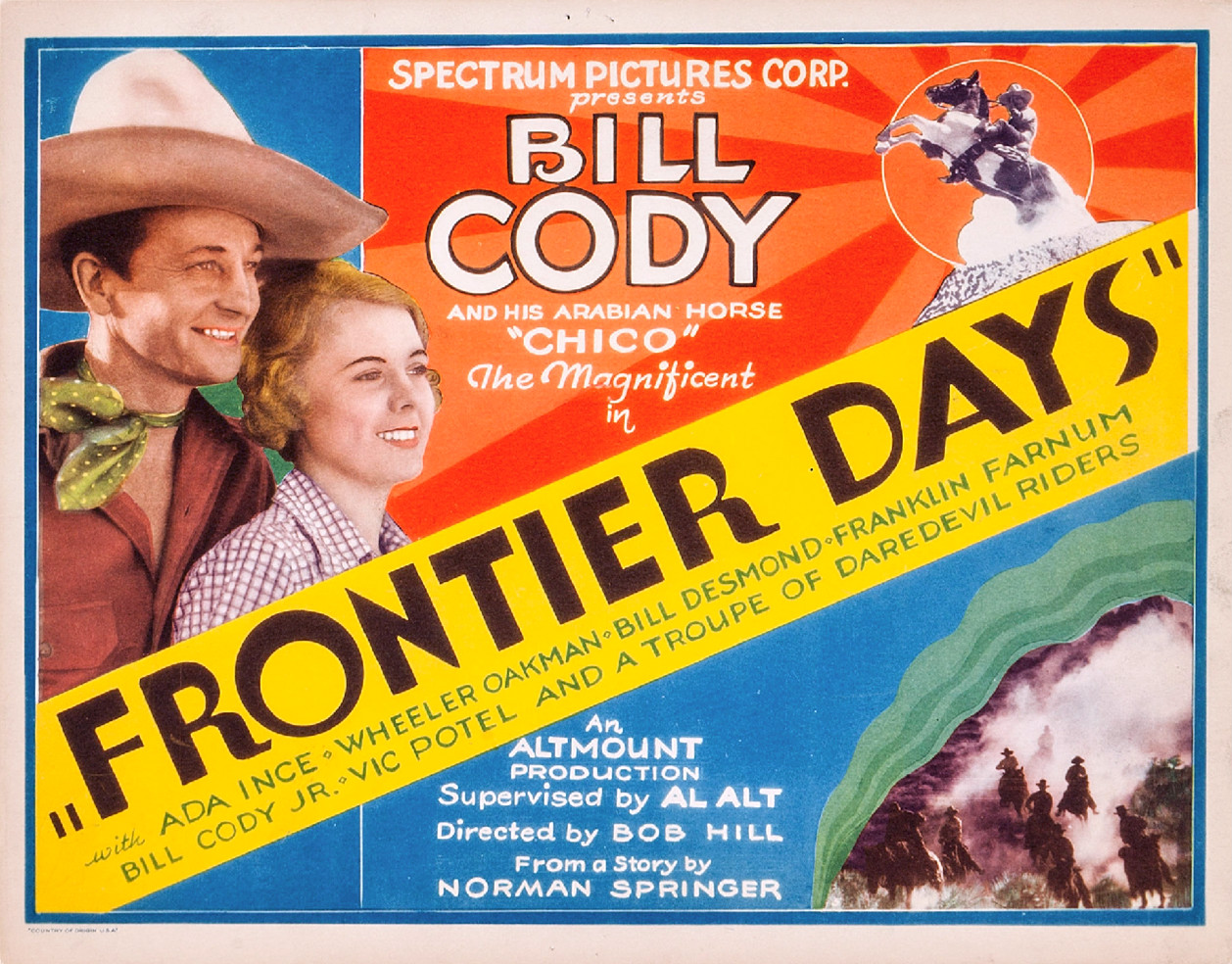
- Directed by: Robert F. Hill
- Written by: Norman Springer; Robert F. Hill
- Produced by: Ray Kirkwood
- Starring: Bill Cody; Ada Ince; Wheeler Oakman
- Cinematography: Brydon Baker
- Edited by: S. Roy Luby
- Music by: Lee Zahler
- Production company: Altmount Pictures
- Distributed by: Spectrum Pictures
- Release date: November 15, 1934
- Running time: 61 minutes
- Country: United States
- Language: English

Frontier Days is a 1934 American western film directed by Robert F. Hill and starring Bill Cody, Ada Ince and Wheeler Oakman. It was produced by independent Poverty Row outfit Altmount Pictures for release as a second feature. Location shooting took place in the Alabama Hills in California.

== Plot ==
A detective working for Wells Fargo goes undercover as The Pinto Kid to investigate the killings of a series of stagecoach drivers. However, this leads to himself being accused of the murder of one of them.

== Cast ==
- Bill Cody as Bill Maywood - aka The Pinto Kid
- Ada Ince as Beth Wilson
- Wheeler Oakman as Enry Jethrow
- Bill Cody Jr. as Bart Wilson
- Franklyn Farnum as George Wilson
- Lafe McKee as Hank Wilson
- Victor Potel as Deputy Tex Hatch
- William Desmond as Sheriff Barnes
- Robert McKenzie as Casey
- Harry Martell as Deputy Rio
- Barney Beasley as Barfly / Deputy
- Herman Hack as Townsman
- Robert F. Hill as Chief Burrows
- Lew Meehan as Deputy
- Fred Parker as Doctor
- Chico as Chico - Pinto Kid's Horse

== Bibliography ==
- Pitts, Michael R. Poverty Row Studios, 1929–1940. McFarland & Company, 2005.
