= Rolph Barnes =

Canadian middle-distance runner

Personal information
- Born: 16 July 1904 Hamilton, Ontario, Canada
- Died: 6 October 1982 (aged 78)

Sport
- Sport: Middle-distance running
- Event: 1500 metres

Rolph Barnes (16 July 1904 – 6 October 1982) was a Canadian middle-distance runner. He competed in the men's 1500 metres at the 1924 Summer Olympics.
