= Giuseppe Palmieri (athlete) =

Italian basketball player

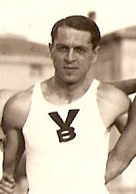

Personal information
- Nationality: Italian
- Born: 21 January 1902 Trani
- Died: 13 October 1989 (aged 87) Trani

Sport
- Country: Italy
- Sport: Athletics
- Events: High jump Javelin throw
- Club: Atletica Virtus Bologna

Achievements and titles
- Personal bests: High jump: 1.86 m (1927); Javelin throw: 59.68 m (1928)

Giuseppe Palmieri (21 January 1902 – 13 October 1989) was an Italian high jumper and javelin thrower who competed at the 1924 Summer Olympics, than he was also basketball player and coach.

== Biography ==
He won two bronze medal at the Pre-Universiade held in Paris in 1928, and he won seven times the national championships at senior level.

== Personal bests ==
- High jump: 1.86 m ( (Italy) Ascoli Piceno, 17 July 1927)
- Javelin throw: 59.68 m ( (Italy) Bologna, 7 October 1928)
- Hammer throw: 30.77 m ( (Italy) Florence, 6 October 1929)
- Discus throw: 36.78 m ( (Italy) Trento, 5 June 1927)
- Shot put: 11.81 m ( (Italy) Turin, 23 September 1929)
- Triple jump: 12.60 m ( (Italy) Cesena, 6 September 1925)
- Pole vault: 3.00 m ( (Italy) Genoa, 13 April 1924)
- Decathlon: 5755.985 pts ( (Italy) Genoa, 12–13 April 1924)

== Achievements ==
Year	Competition	Venue	Position	Event	Time	Notes
1924	Olympic Games	(France) Paris	Qual.	High jump	1.70 m	
1928	Student World Championships	(France) Paris	3rd	High jump	1.80 m	
1928	Student World Championships	(France) Paris	3rd	Javelin throw	57.72	

== National titles ==
- Italian Athletics Championships
  - High jump: 1924, 1925, 1926, 1927, 1928 (5)
  - Javelin throw: 1925, 1929 (2)

== See also ==
- Men's high jump Italian record progression
