= Rainbow's End (1935 film) =

1935 film by Norman Spencer

- Film poster
- Directed by: Norval Spencer
- Written by: Rollo Ward
- Starring: Hoot Gibson
- Cinematography: Gilbert Warrenton
- Edited by: Ralph Dietrich
- Production company: First Division Pictures
- Distributed by: First Division Pictures
- Release date: July 17, 1935
- Running time: 60 minutes
- Country: United States
- Language: English

Rainbow's End is a 1935 American Western film directed by Norval Spencer and starring Hoot Gibson.

== Plot ==
A rancher's son finds himself helping another rancher who is at odds with his father--all because of the father's crooked partner.

== Cast ==
- Hoot Gibson as Neil Gibson Jr.
- June Gale as Ann Ware
- Oscar Apfel as Neil Gibson Sr.
- Ada Ince as Gwen Gibson
- John Elliott as Adam Ware
- Henry Roquemore as Joe Williams
- Jerry Mandy as Ranch Cook
- Charles Hill as Bert Randall
- Warner Richmond as Thomas Stark
- Buddy Roosevelt as "Butch", Henchman
- Stanley Blystone as Dorgan, Ranch Foreman
- Fred Gilman as George Wright, Bookkeeper
- John Ince as Rodeo Judge
- Len Sowards as Lem
