= Mohamed El-Sayed (athlete) =

Egyptian middle-distance runner

Personal information
- Nationality: Egyptian
- Born: 1905

Sport
- Sport: Middle-distance running
- Event: 1500 metres

Mohamed El-Sayed (born 1905, date of death unknown) was an Egyptian middle-distance runner. He competed in the men's 1500 metres at the 1924 Summer Olympics.
