= Vasileios Stavrinos =

Greek sprinter

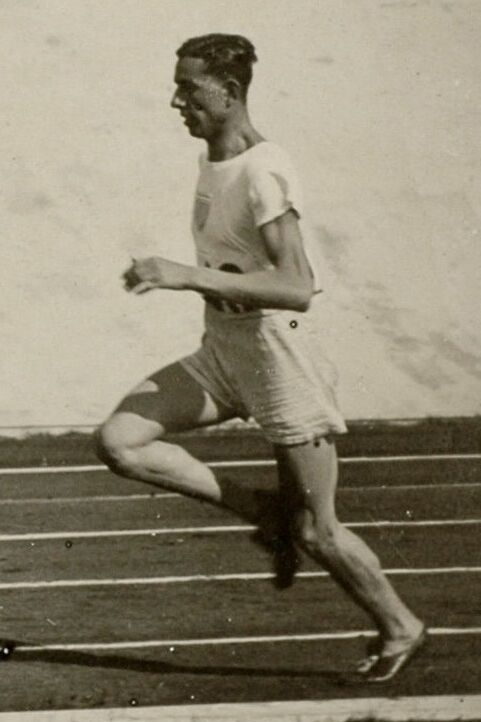
- Vasilios Stavrinos (1928)

Personal information
- Nationality: Greek
- Born: 1 May 1907 Istanbul, Ottoman Empire

Sport
- Sport: Sprinting
- Event: 400 metres

Vasileios Stavrinos (born 1 May 1907, date of death unknown) was a Greek sprinter. He competed in the men's 400 metres at the 1928 Summer Olympics. He also entered the men's 800 metres event, but finished in 6th place in the first heat behind Belgium's Gerard Bertheloot.
