= Ralph Starr =

British middle-distance runner

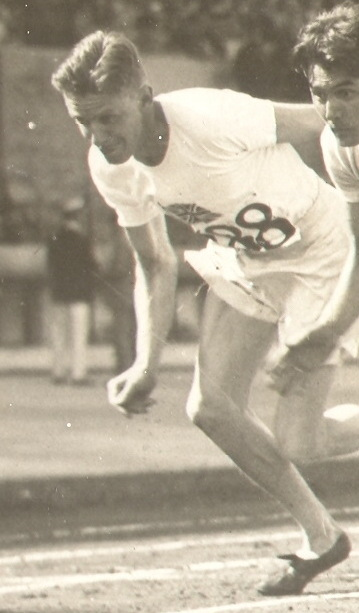
- Ralph Starr in 1928

Personal information
- Nationality: British (English)
- Born: 6 March 1903 Cambridge, England
- Died: 20 November 1959 (aged 56) Marylebone, England

Sport
- Sport: Middle-distance running
- Event: 800 metres
- Club: University of Cambridge AC; Achilles Club

Ralph Stewart Starr (6 March 1903 – 20 November 1959) was a British middle-distance runner who competed at the 1924 Summer Olympics and the 1928 Summer Olympics.

== Biography ==
Starr was born in Cambridge and was educated at Cambridge County School and Christ's College, Cambridge.

Starr went to his first Olympic Games in Paris during 1924, competing in the 5,000 metres event. From 1923 to 1926 he represented Cambridge against Oxford four times and won the Southern mile title in 1925.

At the 1928 Olympic Games in Amsterdam, he competed in the men's 800 metres competition.
