= Earl Fuller (athlete) =

American middle-distance runner

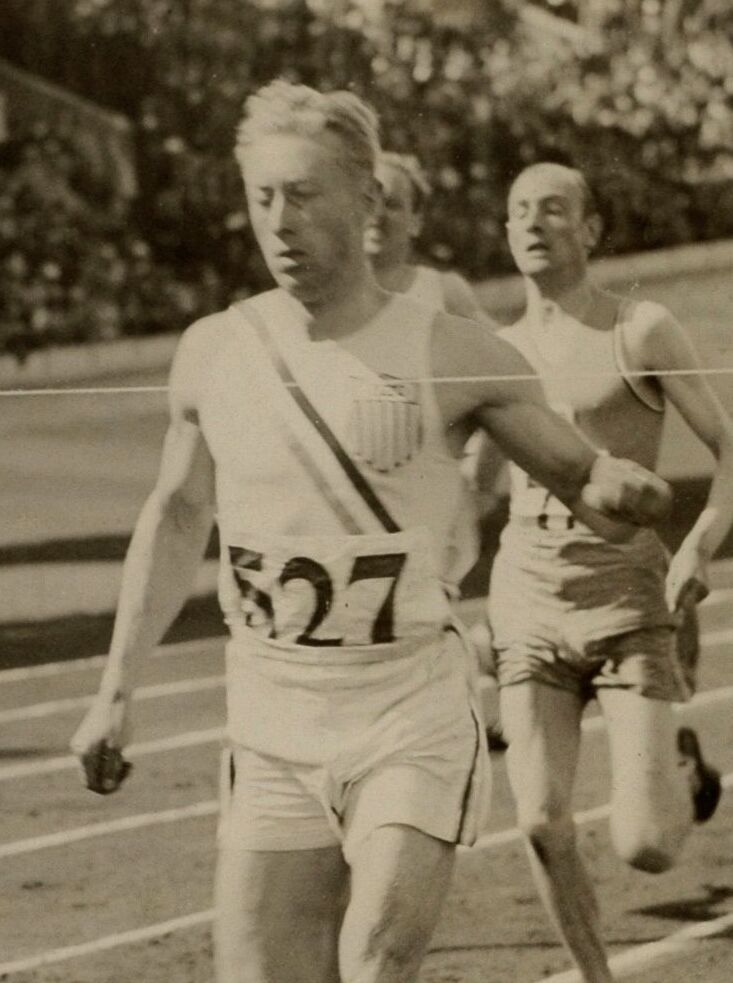
- Earl Fuller in 1928

Personal information
- Nationality: American
- Born: March 6, 1904
- Died: October 23, 1956 (aged 52)

Sport
- Sport: Middle-distance running
- Event: 800 metres

Earl Fuller (March 6, 1904 – October 23, 1956) was an American middle-distance runner. He competed in the men's 800 metres at the 1928 Summer Olympics.
