= Willy Schärer =

Swiss middle-distance runner

Olympic medal record

Men's athletics

Representing Switzerland
Silver medal – second place	1924 Paris	1500 metres

Wilhelm "Willy" Schärer (20 September 1903 – 26 November 1982) was a Swiss middle-distance runner who won a silver medal over 1500 m at the Olympic Games in Paris in 1924. The race was won by Paavo Nurmi.
