= Józef Korolkiewicz =

Polish painter

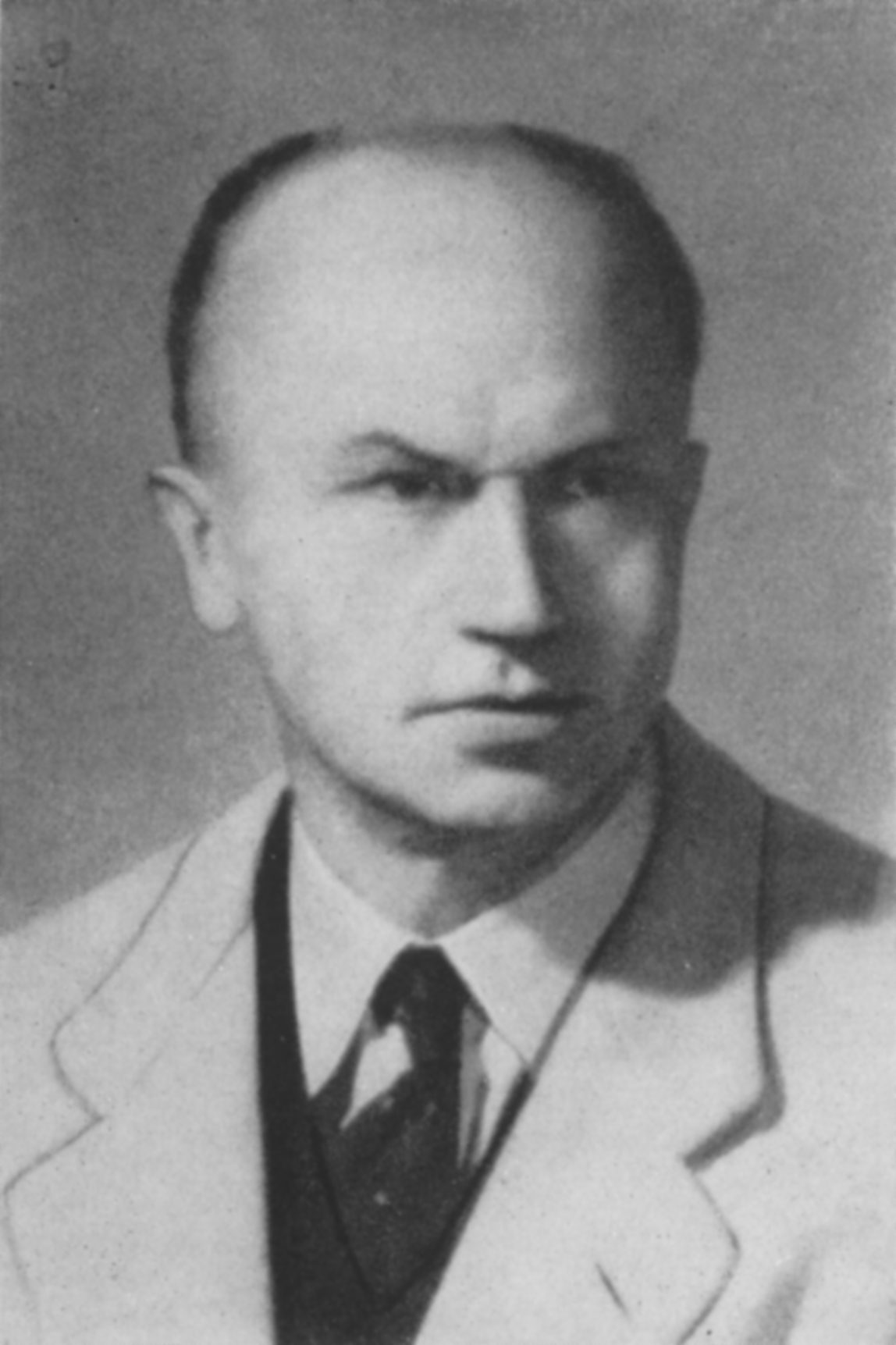
- Józef Korolkiewicz (before 1965)
- Born: 27 April 1902; Godziszewy, Poland
- Died: 18 November 1988 (aged 86); Warsaw, Poland
- Resting place: Old cemetery in Kobyłka
- Education: School of Fine Arts, Warsaw
- Occupations: painter, graphic designer, operatic singer, athlete
- Spouse: Barbara Złotnicka (m. 1941)
- Children: Piotr, Łukasz

Józef Korolkiewicz (27 April 1902 – 18 November 1988) was a Polish painter, graphic designer, operatic singer and athlete.

== Biography ==
He came from a wealthy family. His father, Olgierd, was an agricultural engineer, owner of a country family estate, Nowa Wieś near Kobyłka, and benefactor. His mother, Vlastimila née Vycpálek, was of Czech origin. He had three siblings: Zbigniew, Maria and Andrzej.

=== Artist ===
At age 15, encouraged by a painter and family friend, Wojciech Kossak, he became his youngest student at the Warsaw School of Fine Arts. Being 18 years old, together with his older brother, Zbigniew, he voluntarily joined the Polish Army and took part in the Polish-Bolshevik War in 1920. Between 1922 and 1923 he continued his studies in Kraków in the studio of Ignacy Pieńkowski. In 1924 he returned to Warsaw to Tadeusz Pruszkowski's studio.

He created oil paintings, gouaches and drawings. The main subject of his works was the horse. Other animals, nature and humans appeared less frequently, although he did not hesitate to paint portraits. He made his public debut as a painter at the Zachęta Gallery in 1927. In 1932 his oil painting Bokserzy ("Boxers") was entered in the Olympic Art competition. Between 1936 and 1938 he was staying in Rome, Italy, dedicating his time to painting and vocal studies with Astolfo Pescia, and occasionally performing in concerts. After the outbreak of World War II, he put on the Polish Army uniform again to defend Warsaw against German aggression. During the Warsaw Uprising, he lost almost all of his works created before the war. They were burned in city fires.

Between 1934 and 1949, with a break during the war, he performed as a soloist at the Warsaw Opera, singing baritone. He appeared in a wide variety of roles in such operas as Stanisław Moniuszko's Halka and Straszny dwór, Gioachino Rossini's The Barber of Seville, Charles Gounod's Faust, Georges Bizet's Carmen, Giuseppe Verdi's Rigoletto, Ruggero Leoncavallo's Pagliacci and Giacomo Puccini's Madama Butterfly.

Throughout almost his entire artistic career, he was engaged in applied arts. He designed posters, tapestries, mosaics, medals and postage stamps. He also illustrated books, magazines, sports textbooks and school educational boards. However, from the 1960s he focused mainly on painting and drawing.

=== Athlete ===
He was a track and field athlete, running mostly 400 m hurdles and 400 m. He won five silver medals in the former event at the Polish Athletics Championships (1924, 1925, 1926, 1927, 1930) and a bronze in the 4x400 m relay at the 1927 Summer Student World Championships in Rome, Italy. He was qualified for the 1928 Poland Olympic team but was unable to compete due to injury.

He was also a tennis fan. He himself played it as an amateur, especially in the latter part of his life, competing in old-timers games. As a spectator, he attended the Grand Slam tournaments.

Furthermore, he had ridden horses since childhood, demonstrating great skills in this field.

== Paintings ==
- Runners, 1932
- Children in the Park, 1937
- Zbigniew Korolkiewicz, 1944 – a portrait of his big brother
- Horses, 1969
- Races, 1969
- On the Racetrack, 1970
- Pheasants, 1975
- Horse Ride, 1977
- Hounting, 1979
- Raiders, 1979
- Gallop
- Cantering Horses, 1980
- Horses in the Moonlight, 1983
- Galloping Horses, 1984
