= Ray Buker =

American middle-distance runner

Raymond Bates "Ray" Buker, Sr.
- Born: August 27, 1899; Foster, Rhode Island, US
- Died: June 3, 1992 (aged 92); Boca Raton, Florida, US
- Education: Bates College
- Organization: Illinois Athletic Club
- Height: 167 cm (5 ft 6 in)

Raymond Bates Buker, Sr. (August 27, 1899 – June 3, 1992) was an American track and field athlete who competed in the 1924 Summer Olympics. He was born in Foster, Rhode Island and died in Boca Raton, Florida. He was a member of the Illinois Athletic Club. In the 1924 Olympics he finished fifth in the 1500 metres competition.
