= Robert Chottin =

French middle-distance runner

Personal information
- Nationality: French
- Born: 20 February 1900
- Died: 13 March 1974 (aged 74)

Sport
- Sport: Middle-distance running
- Event: 1500 metres

Robert Chottin (20 February 1900 – 13 March 1974) was a French middle-distance runner. He competed in the men's 1500 metres at the 1924 Summer Olympics.
