= Sonny Spencer =

British middle-distance runner

Personal information
- Nationality: British
- Born: 18 May 1903 Mitcham, London, England
- Died: 21 November 1943 (aged 40) Nigg, Scotland

Sport
- Sport: Middle-distance running
- Event: 1500 metres

Sonny Spencer (18 May 1903 – 21 November 1943) was a British middle-distance runner, who competed at the 1924 Summer Olympics.

== Biography ==
Spencer finished third behind Cecil Griffiths in the 880 yards event at the 1923 AAA Championships.

At the 1924 Olympic Games, Spencer competed in the men's 1500 metres.

Spencer served as a sergeant in the Royal Air Force Volunteer Reserve during the Second World War. He was killed in a night training accident when his Short Sunderland crashed at Nigg on 21 November 1943. Spencer is commemorated at the Runnymede Memorial.
