= Gerard Bertheloot =

Belgian middle-distance runner

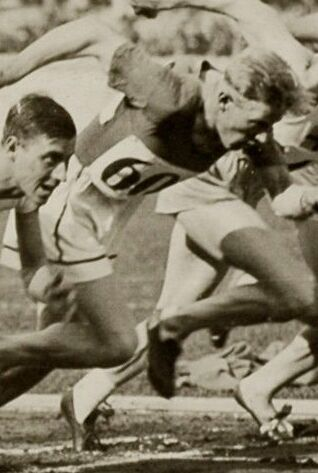
- Gerard Bertheloot in 1928

Personal information
- Nationality: Belgian
- Born: 5 January 1906 Rollegem-Kapelle
- Died: 5 October 1950 (aged 44) Kortrijk

Sport
- Sport: Middle-distance running
- Event: 800 metres
- Club: Union Sportive Gantoise

Gerard Bertheloot (5 January 1906 – 5 October 1950) was a Belgian middle-distance runner. He competed in the men's 800 metres at the 1928 Summer Olympics.

== Biography ==
Bertheloot was born in Rollegem-Kapelle in West Flanders in 1908. He moved to Kortrijk, where he was employed in a bicycle factory. He appears to have been a member of the Union Sportive Gantoise athletics club in Ghent.

In 1928, Bertheloot competed in the Olympic Games which were held in Amsterdam. Bertheloot ran in the 1st heat of the men's 800 metres, which was held on 29 July 1928 at the Olympic Stadium. He finished in fifth place, behind Guus Zeegers of the Netherlands and ahead of Vasileios Stavrinos, who was competing for Greece.

Bertheloot died without having children, at the age of 44 on 5 October 1950.
