= Gösta Jansson =

Finnish middle-distance runner

Personal information
- Nationality: Finnish
- Born: 8 February 1903 Tikkurila, Russian Empire
- Died: 20 May 1958 (aged 55) Tikkurila, Finland

Sport
- Sport: Middle-distance running
- Event: 800 metres

Gösta Jansson (8 February 1903 – 20 May 1958) was a Finnish middle-distance runner. He competed in the men's 800 metres at the 1924 Summer Olympics.
