= Ray Dodge =

American middle-distance runner (1900–1985)

Personal information
- Born: August 4, 1900 Woodburn, Oregon, U.S.
- Died: March 28, 1985 (aged 84) Key Biscayne, Florida, U.S.
- Height: 181 cm (5 ft 11 in)
- Weight: 78 kg (172 lb)

Sport
- Sport: Athletics
- Events: 800 m, 1500 m, mile
- Club: Oregon State Beavers, Corvallis; Multnomah AC

Achievements and titles
- Olympic finals: 1924 Summer Olympics
- Personal bests: 800 m – 1:53.9 (1924); 1500 m – 4:01.6 (1925); Mile – 4:20.9 (1925)

Raymond Edgar Dodge (August 4, 1900 – March 28, 1985) was an American middle-distance runner who competed at the 1924 Summer Olympics.

== Career ==
Dodge placed sixth in the 800 metres at the 1924 Olympic Games in Paris. The following year he finished third behind Cecil Griffiths in the 880 yards event at the British 1925 AAA Championships.

He won the AAU indoor title in the 1,000 yards in 1926. Outdoors he placed third at the AAU Championships in 1924 and 1927.

After retiring from competitions Dodge founded and ran metalworks that produced the Oscars for the Academy Awards. In May 1935 he married Ada Ince.
