= Schuyler Enck =

American middle-distance runner (1900–1970)

Personal information
- Full name: Schuyler Colfax Enck Jr.
- Nickname: Sky
- Born: January 25, 1900 Columbia, Pennsylvania, U.S.
- Died: November 1, 1970 (aged 70) Harrisburg, Pennsylvania, U.S.
- Education: Pennsylvania State University; U. Penn Dental School
- Occupation: Dentist
- Height: 1.78 m (5 ft 10 in)
- Weight: 73 kg (161 lb)
- Spouse: Mary Eleanor Bixler (1932)

Sport
- Sport: Track and field
- Event: 800 metres
- College team: Pennsylvania State University
- Coached by: C. W. Martin (Penn State)
Medal record
Representing the United States
Men's athletics
Representing the United States
Bronze medal – third place	1924 Paris	800 metres

Schuyler Colfax "Sky" Enck (January 25, 1900 – November 1, 1970) was an American track and field athlete who competed for Penn State and specialized in the 800 metres event. He represented the United States in the 1924 Summer Olympics, held in Paris, in the 800 metres where he won the bronze medal.

== Early life ==
Enck was born January 25, 1900 in Columbia, Pennsylvania to the Reverend Schuyler C. Enck and Elizabeth Seltzer Enck. In 1917, Enck's father became the superintendent of the East Pennsylvania Conference of the United Brethren Church. Reverend Schuyler had formerly been the pastor in Columbia prior to the family move to Philadelphia. He attended West Philadelphia High School, where in his Senior year, he helped lead their track team to the city senior championship, winning a 3.5 mile cross country race held at Philadelphia's College Boat Club in a time of 19:39. He placed first among 39 finishers.

== 1924 Paris Olympics ==
Enck represented the United States in the Men's 800 metres competition at the 1924 Paris Olympics taking a bronze medal with a time of 1:53.0. A pre-game favorite, Enck had formerly run one of the top times in world in the event with a 1:53.2. Bronze medalist Paul Martin of Switzerland was another pre-game favorite, as was Henry Stallard of Great Britain, though he placed fourth. Douglas Lowe of Great Britain took the gold with a time of 1:52.4, and early favorite Paul Martin of Switzerland took the silver with a time of 1:52.6.

== Penn State ==
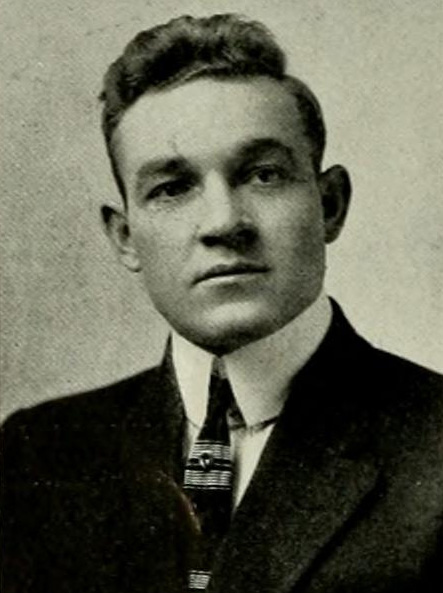
Penn State track coach C. W. Martin, 1913

Enck attended Pennsylvania State University, from around 1919 through 1923, where he ran track for Charles W. "Bill" Martin. A former Notre Dame sprinter, Martin coached track at Penn State from around 1920 through the mid-1920's, then left to coach at Harvard University, considered one of America's top track teams at the time. A notably strong team in track that year under Martin, at the 1924 Olympics, in addition to Enck, Penn State sent Charles Moore, Blondy Romig, Alan Helfrich, and Art Studenroth to compete for the U.S. team in track and field.

In February, 1925, Enk won the 800 meter indoor race in world record time at the Wilco Athletic Club meet with a burst of speed in the last lap, breaking the tape eight yards ahead of second place finisher Ray Watson of the Illinois Athletic Club. In one of his most noteworthy collegiate meets, Enck was part of a world record of 7:48.8 in the 4x880 yard relay when the Penn State relay team beat the team from Oxford at the Penn Relays in 1923. In June, 1923, Enck helped lead Penn State to the team championships at the annual intercollegiate track and field meet at the University of Pittsburgh. At the 1923 Intercollegiate meet, Enck won the one mile competition, possibly his best collegiate event, with a time of 4:32.2 and placed second in the half mile. Enck was part of the two-mile relay World Championship team in 1924 for Penn State and also held the Penn State record for the half mile for a notable 33 years. Enck was a member of the professional fraternities, Sigma Phi Epilson and Delta Sigma Delta.

After graduating Penn State, Enck received a degree in dentistry around 1926 from the University of Pennsylvania School of Dental Medicine.

== Marriage ==
Enck married Mary Eleanor Bixler on the evening of November 26, 1932 at the Keller Memorial Lutheran Church in Washington, D.C. His wife Eleanor was a graduate of George Washington University, and a member of Kappa Kappa Gamma Sorority. A reception at the Washington Club followed the ceremony. After a trip, the couple planned to live in Harrisburg.

After graduating the University of Pennsylvania School of Dentistry, Enck practiced Dentistry from around 1930 through 1970 in Harrisburg.

He died October 18, 1970, at the age of 58 in Harrisburg, Pennsylvania, and was buried at the East Harrisburg Cemetery. Active in professional service and community activities, Enck was a member of the Harrisburg Dental Society, the Camera Club, the Torch Club, and with an interest in history, the Civil War Round Table. Services were held October 21 at State Street United Methodist Church. He was survived by a daughter and two grandchildren.

== See also ==
- List of Pennsylvania State University Olympians
