= Max Tarnogrocki =

German middle-distance runner

Personal information
- Nationality: German
- Born: 4 September 1904 Bad Frankenhausen, German Empire
- Died: 22 December 1993 (aged 89) Berlin, Germany

Sport
- Sport: Middle-distance running
- Event: 800 metres

Max Tarnogrocki (4 September 1904 – 22 December 1993) was a German middle-distance runner. He competed in the men's 800 metres at the 1928 Summer Olympics.
