= Joy Street =

1929 film

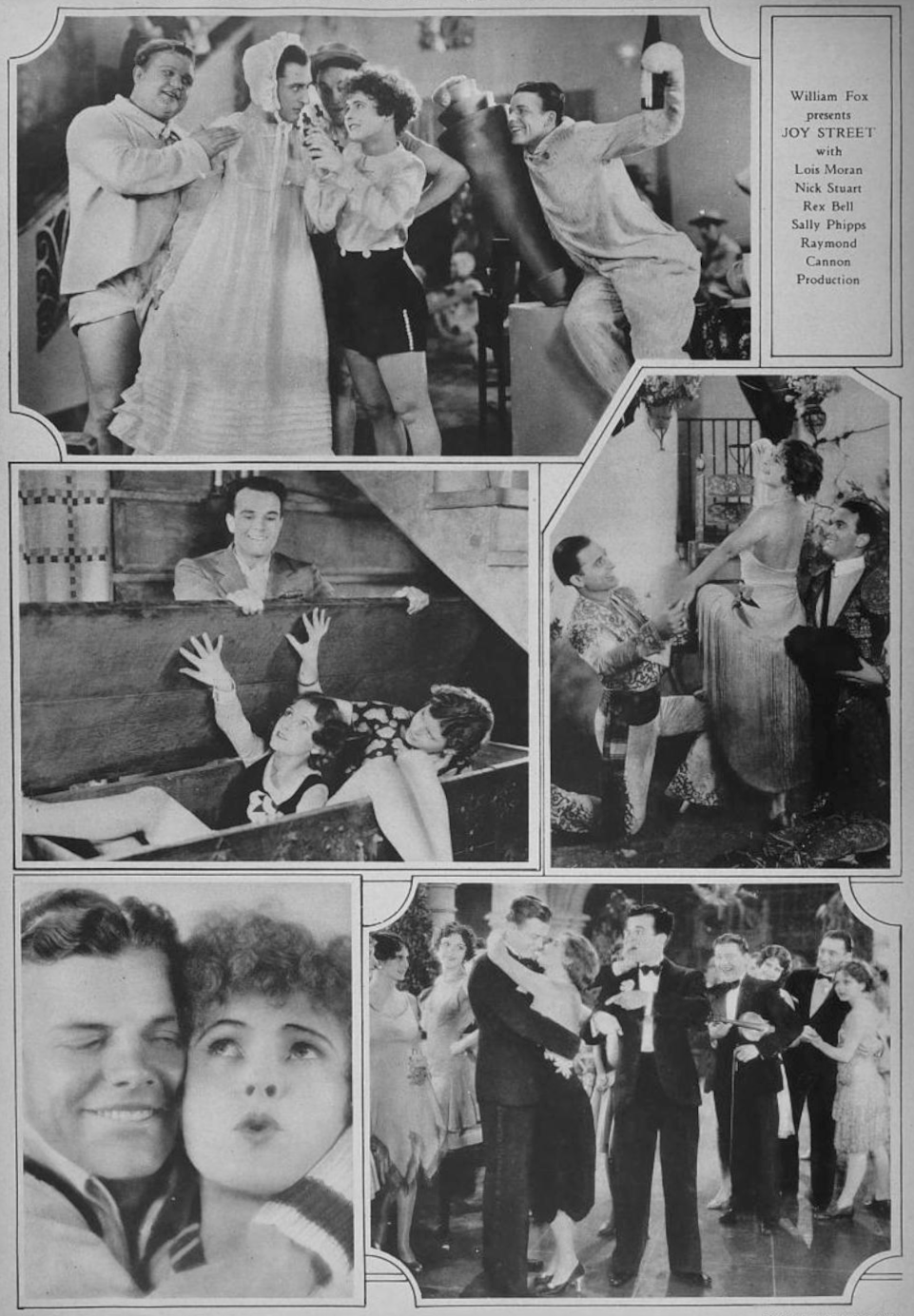
- Directed by: Raymond Cannon
- Written by: Raymond Cannon; Charles R. Condon; Frank Gay; Malcolm Stuart Boylan
- Starring: Lois Moran; Nick Stuart; Rex Bell
- Cinematography: Ernest Miller
- Production company: Fox Film Corporation
- Distributed by: Fox Film Corporation
- Release date: May 12, 1929
- Country: United States
- Languages: Sound (Synchronized); English intertitles

Joy Street is a 1929 American Synchronized sound romantic drama film directed by Raymond Cannon and starring Lois Moran, Nick Stuart, and Rex Bell. It was produced by the Fox Film Corporation. The sound was recorded using the Movietone recording system. While the film has no audible dialog, it was released with a synchronized musical score with sound effects using both the sound-on-disc and sound-on-film process.

== Cast ==
- Lois Moran as Marie Colman (Mimi)
- Nick Stuart as Joe
- Rex Bell as Eddie
- Sally Phipps as Mabel
- Maria Alba as Agnes
- Florence Allen as Becky
- James Barnes as Harry
- John Breeden as Tom
- José Crespo as Juan
- Paul d'Estournelles de Constant as Teacher
- Allen Dale as Dizzy
- Charles Eaton as Student
- Captain Marco Elter as Skiing Mailman
- Ada Ince as Beverly
- Marshall Ruth as Dick
- Lupita Tovar
- Mabel Vail as Dean of Girls' School
- Dorothy Ward as Dot
- Carol Wines as Maid

== Music ==
The film features a theme song entitled “Lonely (Oh How I Miss You Sweetheart)” by Walter Hirsch (words) and Monte Wilhite (music).

== See also ==
- List of early sound feature films (1926–1929)

== Bibliography ==
- Pancho Kohner. Lupita Tovar The Sweetheart of Mexico. Xlibris Corporation, 2011.
