= Ludwig Deckardt =

Austrian middle-distance runner

Personal information
- Nationality: Austrian
- Born: 23 March 1902

Sport
- Sport: Middle-distance running
- Event: 800 metres

Ludwig Deckardt (born 23 March 1902, date of death unknown) was an Austrian middle-distance runner. He competed in the men's 800 metres at the 1924 Summer Olympics.
