= Maurice Grosclaude =

French middle-distance runner

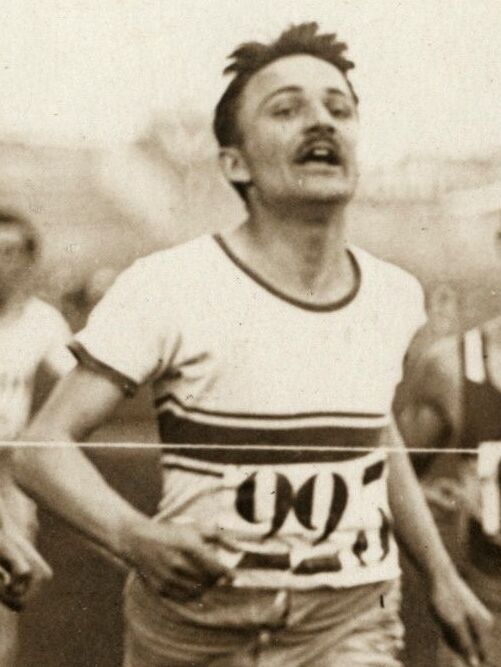
- Maurice Grosclaude in 1924

Personal information
- Nationality: French
- Born: 22 February 1900
- Died: 15 September 1985 (aged 85)

Sport
- Sport: Middle-distance running
- Event: 800 metres

Maurice Grosclaude (22 February 1900 – 15 September 1985) was a French middle-distance runner. He competed in the men's 800 metres at the 1924 Summer Olympics.
