= Jack Newman (runner) =

Australian middle-distance runner

Personal information
- Full name: Jack Heather Newman
- Nationality: Australian
- Born: July 1903 Melbourne, Australia
- Died: 22 August 1976 (aged 73) Sydney, Australia

Sport
- Sport: Middle-distance running
- Event: 800 metres

Jack Heather Newman (July 1903 – 22 August 1976) was an Australian middle-distance runner. He competed in the men's 800 metres and 1500 metres at the 1924 Summer Olympics.
