= Arvo Peussa =

Finnish middle-distance runner (1900–1941)

Personal information
- Full name: Aarne Aatami Peussa
- Nationality: Finnish
- Born: 25 December 1900 Koivisto, Grand Duchy of Finland, Russian Empire
- Died: 19 July 1941 (aged 40)

Sport
- Sport: Middle-distance running
- Event: 1500 metres

Aarne Aatami "Arvo" Peussa (25 December 1900 – 19 July 1941) was a Finnish middle-distance runner. He competed in the men's 1500 metres at the 1924 Summer Olympics where he won his heat to come 9th in the final. He was killed in action at age 40 in Russia during World War II.
