= John Watters (athlete) =

American middle-distance runner

Personal information
- Nationality: American
- Born: July 22, 1903
- Died: August 3, 1962 (aged 59)

Sport
- Sport: Middle-distance running
- Event: 800 metres

John Watters (July 22, 1903 – August 3, 1962) was an American middle-distance runner. He competed in the men's 800 metres at the 1924 Summer Olympics. He graduated from Harvard College in 1926.
