= René Jubeau =

French middle-distance runner

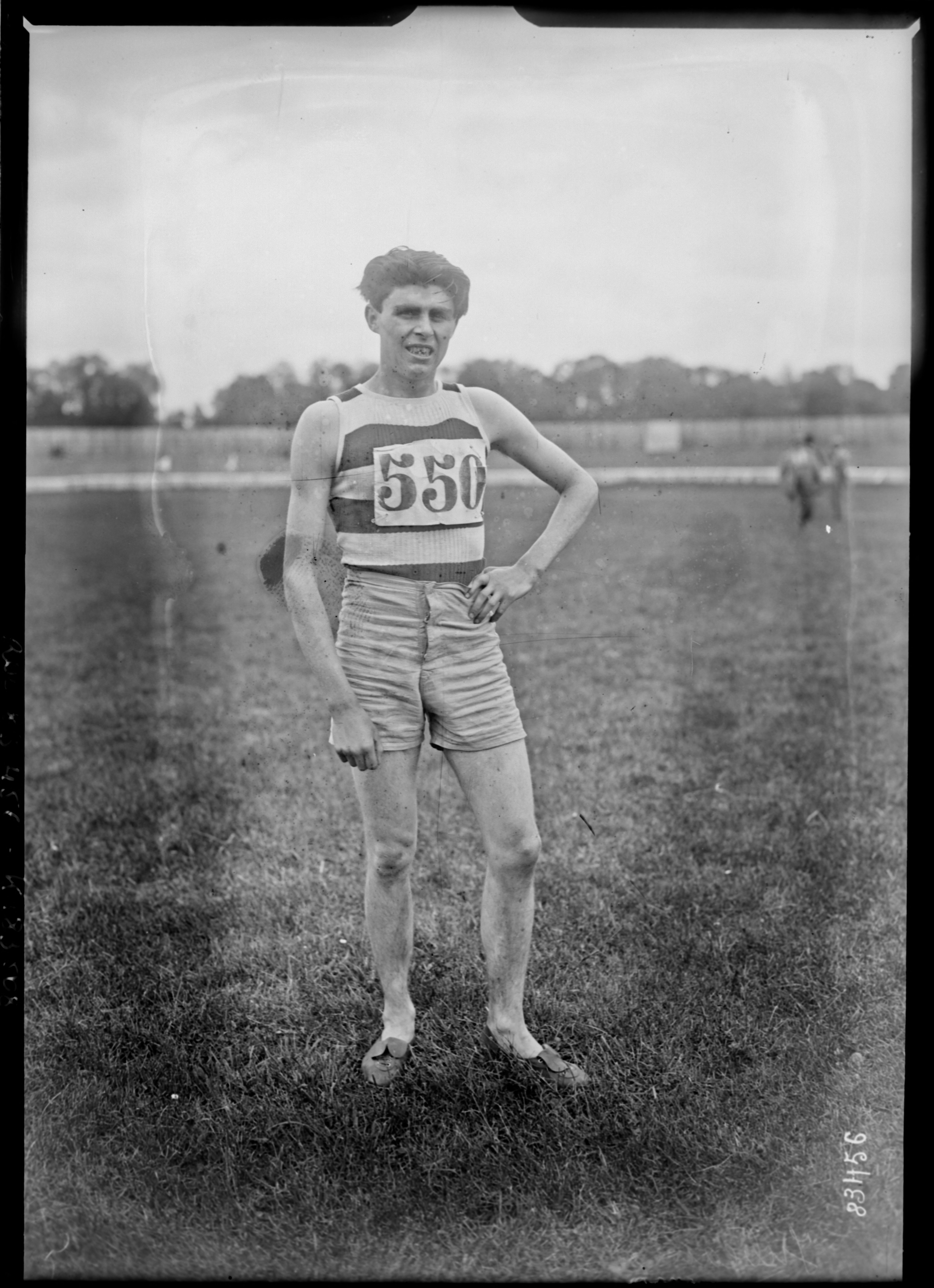

Personal information
- Nationality: French
- Born: 29 September 1905
- Died: 21 April 1976 (aged 70)

Sport
- Sport: Middle-distance running
- Event: 1500 metres

René Jubeau (29 September 1905 – 21 April 1976) was a French middle-distance runner. He competed in the men's 1500 metres at the 1924 Summer Olympics.
