= Antonios Mangos =

Greek middle-distance runner

Personal information
- Nationality: Greek
- Born: 1910
- Died: December 1940 (aged 29–30) Ioannina, Greece

Sport
- Sport: Middle-distance running
- Event: 800 metres

Antonios Mangos (1910 – December 1940) was a Greek middle-distance runner. He competed in the men's 800 metres at the 1928 Summer Olympics. He died during the Greco-Italian War.
