= Lyuben Karastoyanov =

Bulgarian middle-distance runner

Personal information
- Nationality: Bulgarian
- Born: 1904

Sport
- Sport: Middle-distance running
- Event: 1500 metres

Lyuben Karastoyanov (born 1904, date of death unknown) was a Bulgarian middle-distance runner. He competed in the men's 1500 metres at the 1924 Summer Olympics.
