= István Grósz =

Hungarian middle-distance runner

Personal information
- Nationality: Hungarian
- Born: 20 November 1895 Budapest, Hungary
- Died: 16 April 1945 (aged 49) Budapest, Hungary

Sport
- Sport: Middle-distance running
- Event: 1500 metres

István Grósz (20 November 1895 – 16 April 1945) was a Jewish Hungarian middle-distance runner. He competed in the men's 1500 metres at the 1924 Summer Olympics.

He was executed by the paramilitary of the Arrow Cross Party in 1944.
