= Georges Baraton =

French middle-distance runner

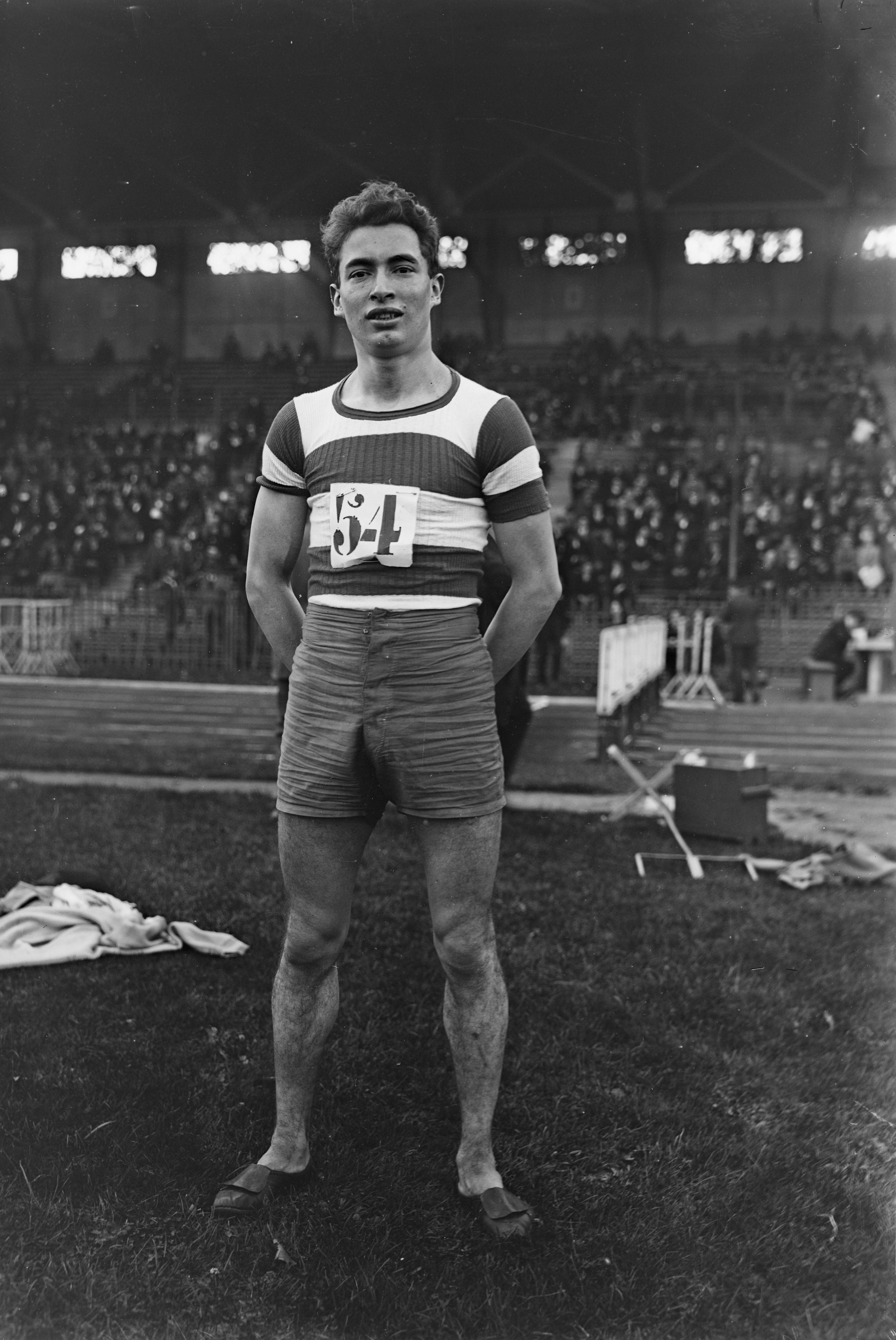

Personal information
- Nationality: French
- Born: 12 April 1904 Saulzais-le-Potier, Cher, France
- Died: 11 November 1962 (aged 58) Clichy, Hauts-de-Seine, France
- Height: 172 cm (5 ft 8 in)
- Weight: 60 kg (132 lb)

Sport
- Sport: Middle-distance running
- Event: 800 metres
- Club: Métropolitain Club Colombes

Georges Léon Baraton (12 April 1904 – 11 November 1962) was a French middle-distance runner who competed at two Olympic Games.

== Career ==
Baraton competed in the 800 metres at the 1924 Summer Olympics and reached the semi-finals.

Baraton won the British AAA Championships title in the 1 mile event at the 1926 AAA Championships.

At the 1928 Summer Olympics, Baraton once again reached the semi-finals of the 800 metres.
