= Jack Harris (athlete) =

Canadian middle-distance runner

Personal information
- Nationality: Canadian
- Born: May 1902 Aspley Guise, Bedford, England
- Died: 23 August 1997 (aged 95) Winnipeg, Manitoba, Canada

Sport
- Sport: Middle-distance running
- Event: 800 metres

Francis John Harris (May 1902 – 23 August 1997) was a Canadian middle-distance runner. He competed in the men's 800 metres at the 1924 Summer Olympics.
