= Bill Richardson (runner) =

American middle-distance runner (1903–1969)

Personal information
- Full name: William Hord Richardson
- Nationality: American
- Born: December 25, 1903 Los Angeles, California, U.S.
- Died: December 28, 1969 (aged 66) Los Angeles, California, U.S.

Sport
- Sport: Middle-distance running
- Event: 800 metres

William Hord Richardson (December 25, 1903 – December 28, 1969) was an American middle-distance runner. He competed in the men's 800 metres at the 1924 Summer Olympics.

Competing for the Stanford Cardinal track and field team, Richardson finished runner-up in the 800 m at the 1925 NCAA Track and Field Championships.
