= Rudolf Johansson =

Swedish middle-distance runner

Personal information
- Nationality: Swedish
- Born: 12 April 1899
- Died: 28 November 1994 (aged 95)

Sport
- Sport: Middle-distance running
- Event: 800 metres

Rudolf Johansson (12 April 1899 – 28 November 1994) was a Swedish middle-distance runner. He competed in the men's 800 metres at the 1924 Summer Olympics.
