= Jaakko Luoma =

Finnish middle-distance runner

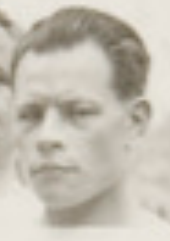

Personal information
- Nationality: Finnish
- Born: 9 July 1897
- Died: 12 March 1940 (aged 42)

Sport
- Sport: Middle-distance running
- Event: 1500 metres

Jaakko Luoma (9 July 1897 – 12 March 1940) was a Finnish middle-distance runner. He competed in the men's 1500 metres at the 1924 Summer Olympics. He was killed in action during World War II.
