= Eduard Riedl =

Czech middle-distance runner

Personal information
- Nationality: Czech
- Born: 20 August 1901

Sport
- Sport: Middle-distance running
- Event: 800 metres

Eduard Riedl (born 20 August 1901, date of death unknown) was a Czech middle-distance runner. He competed in the men's 800 metres at the 1924 Summer Olympics.
