= Jacques Flouret =

French athlete

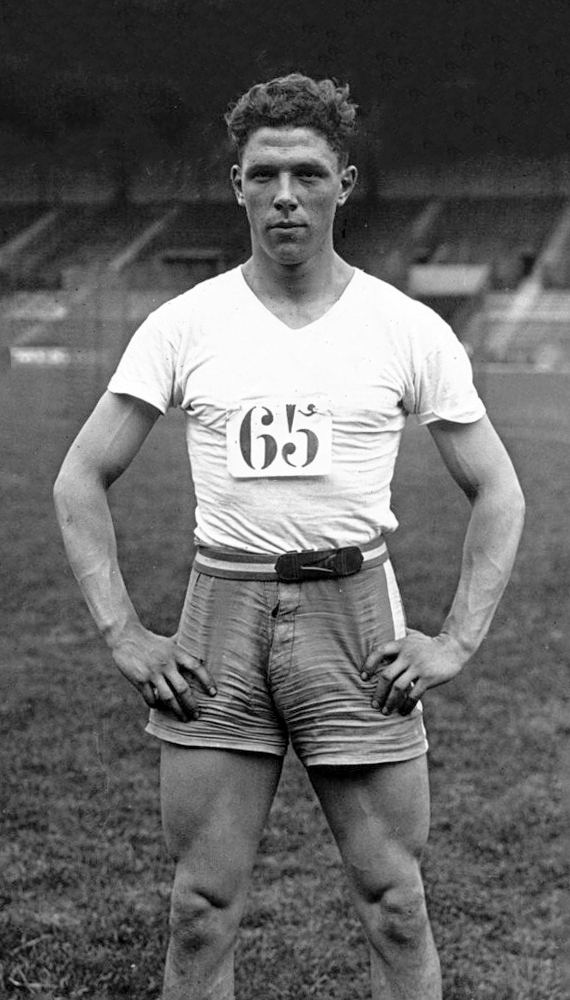
- Flouret in 1927

Personal information
- Born: 8 September 1907 Saint-Maur, France
- Died: 4 October 1973 (aged 66)
- Height: 186 cm (6 ft 1 in)
- Weight: 87 kg (192 lb)

Sport
- Sport: Athletics, basketball
- Events: Long jump, pentathlon, javelin throw
- Club: Paris UC

Achievements and titles
- Personal best: LJ – 7.05 m (1927)
Medal record
Representing France
Athletics
Student World Championships
Silver medal – second place	1927 Rome	Javelin throw
Silver medal – second place	1927 Rome	Pentathlon
Bronze medal – third place	1928 Paris	Pentathlon
Basketball
EuroBasket
Bronze medal – third place	1937 Riga	Team

Jacques Flouret (8 September 1907 – 4 October 1973) was a multi-talented French athlete.

== Track and field career ==
Flouret won three medals in the pentathlon and javelin throw, at the Student World Championships of 1927 and 1928. He finished 28th in the long jump at the 1928 Summer Olympics.

== Basketball career ==
Between 1930 and 1938, Flouret played in 25 international games as a shooting guard, for the senior French national basketball team, and scored 48 points. Those 25 games included the opening match of France-Estonia, at the 1936 Summer Olympics, and the EuroBasket 1937 tournament, where France won the bronze medal. He was inducted into the French Basketball Hall of Fame, in 2010.

== Post-athletic career ==
After retiring from sports in 1938, Flouret had a long career as a sports official in France.
