= Louis Philipps =

French middle-distance runner

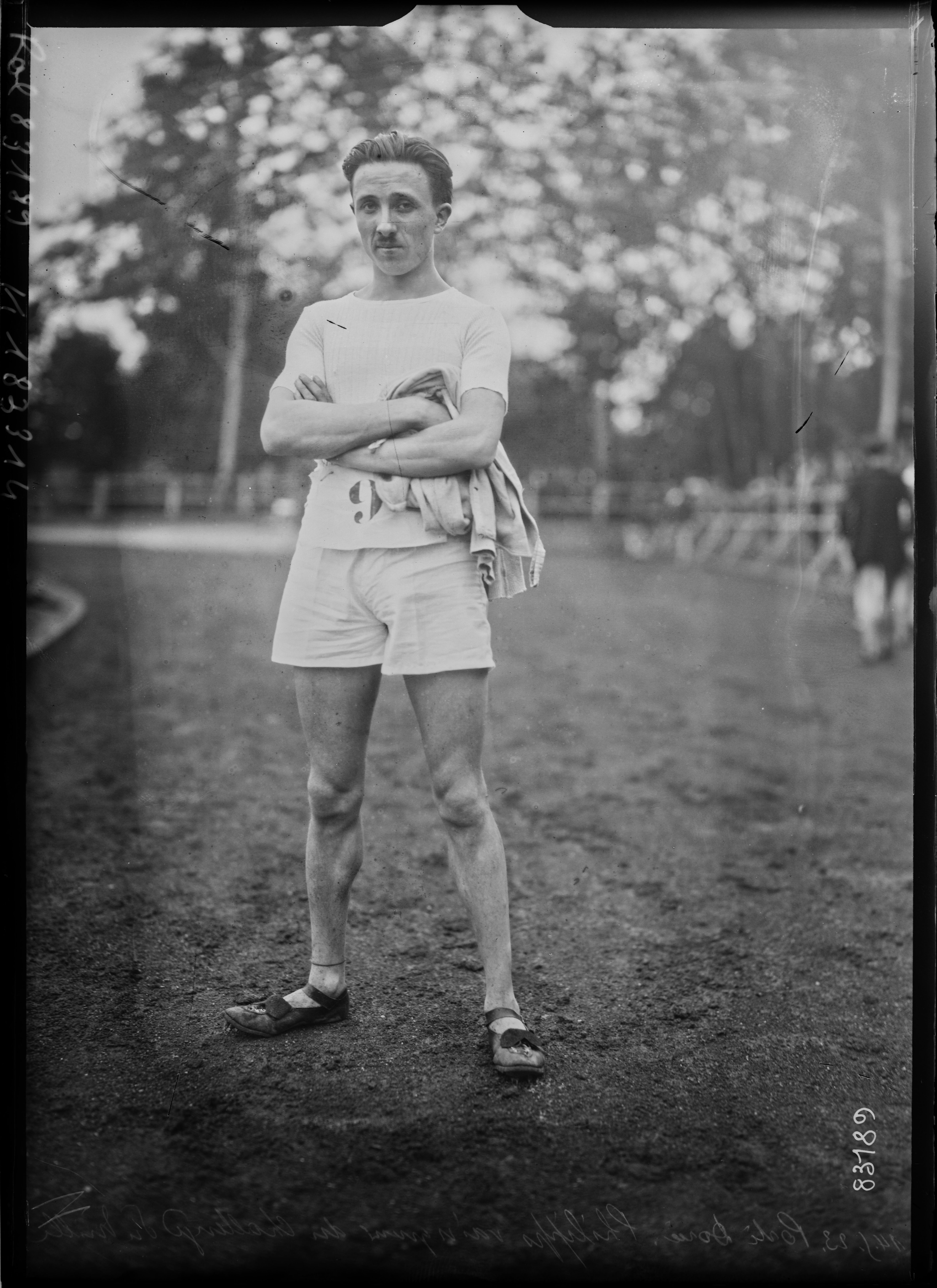

Personal information
- Nationality: French
- Born: 8 January 1904
- Died: 3 October 1965 (aged 61)

Sport
- Sport: Middle-distance running
- Event: 800 metres

Louis Philipps (8 January 1904 – 3 October 1965) was a French middle-distance runner. He competed in the men's 800 metres at the 1924 Summer Olympics.
