= Paul Martin (Swiss athlete) =

Swiss middle-distance runner

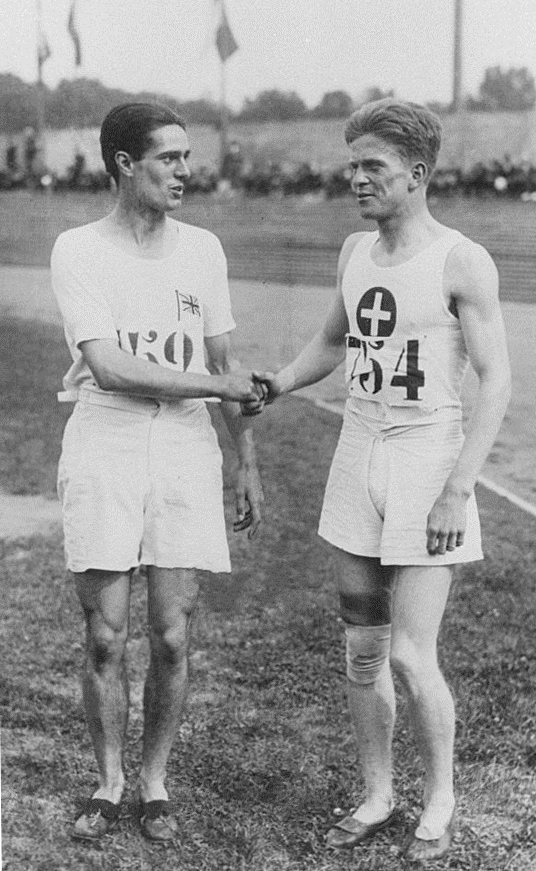
- Douglas Lowe and Paul Martin (right) at the 1924 Olympics

Personal information
- Born: 11 August 1901 Geneva, Switzerland
- Died: 28 April 1987 (aged 85) Lausanne, Switzerland
- Height: 1.75 m (5 ft 9 in)
- Weight: 63 kg (139 lb)

Sport
- Sport: Athletics
- Event: 400–1500 m
- Club: Cercle des Sports Lausanne; Stade Lausanne

Achievements and titles
- Personal bests: 400 m – 47.8 (1928); 800 m – 1:51.8 (1928); 1500 m – 3:58.1 (1934)
Medal record
Representing Switzerland
Olympic Games
| Silver medal – second place | 1924 Paris | 800 metres |
World Student Games
| Gold medal – first place | 1923 Paris | 800 metres |
| Gold medal – first place | 1927 Rome | 400 metres |
| Gold medal – first place | 1927 Rome | 800 metres |
| Silver medal – second place | 1927 Rome | 1500 metres |

Paul-René Martin (11 August 1901 – 28 April 1987) was a Swiss middle-distance runner. He was the first Swiss sportsperson to compete at five Olympics, which he did from 1920 to 1936.

== Career ==
At every Olympics he competed in the 800 metres; he won a silver medal in 1924, behind Douglas Lowe, and failed to reach the final in other years. In 1928 and 1936 he also took part in the 1500 m event, and finished sixth in 1928. At the 1936 Games Martin also submitted an entry in the literature section of the art competition.

Martin was the flag bearer for Switzerland three times: the opening and closing ceremonies of the 1936 Summer Olympics, and the opening ceremony of the 1932 Summer Olympics.

Martin finished third behind Edgar Mountain in the 880 yards event at the 1922 AAA Championships.

== See also ==
- List of athletes with the most appearances at Olympic Games
