= Giovanni Garaventa =

Italian middle-distance runner

Personal information
- Nationality: Italian
- Born: 18 April 1900 Genoa
- Died: 8 August 1986 (aged 86)

Sport
- Country: Italy
- Sport: Athletics
- Event: Middle-distance running

Giovanni Garaventa (18 April 1900 - 8 August 1986) was an Italian middle-distance runner who competed at the 1924 Summer Olympics,
