= Alfred Müller (runner) =

German middle-distance runner

Personal information
- Born: 8 June 1905 Lyck, Germany
- Died: 17 March 1959 (aged 53) Berlin, Germany
- Height: 1.74 m (5 ft 9 in)
- Weight: 67 kg (148 lb)

Sport
- Sport: Athletics
- Club: Zehlendorf 88 Berlin

Alfred "Fredy" Müller (8 June 1905 – 17 March 1959) was a German middle-distance runner. In 1928, he won a silver medal in 800 m at the 1928 Summer Student World Championships. He competed in this event at the 1928 Summer Olympics, but failed to reach the final.
