= Disma Ferrario =

Italian middle-distance runner

Personal information
- Nationality: Italian
- Born: 29 January 1899 Milan
- Died: 3 March 1979 (aged 80)

Sport
- Country: Italy
- Sport: Athletics
- Event: Middle-distance running

Disma Ferrario (29 January 1899 – 3 March 1979) was an Italian male middle-distance runner who competed at the 1924 Summer Olympics,
