= Ada Williams (actress) =

American actress

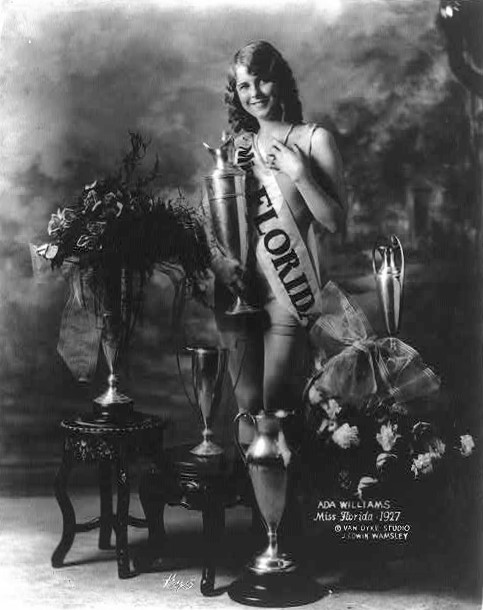
- Williams as "Miss Florida" 1927
- Born: Ada Williams; June 2, 1913; Louisville, Kentucky
- Died: August 12, 1975 (aged 62); Blowing Rock, North Carolina
- Years active: 1929–1935
- Spouses: William Thomas Ince (1929-1934); Ray Dodge (1935-1975)

Ada Williams (June 2, 1913 – August 12, 1975) was an American film actress.

== Biography ==
She was the daughter of Calvin Williams of Knoxville, Kentucky.

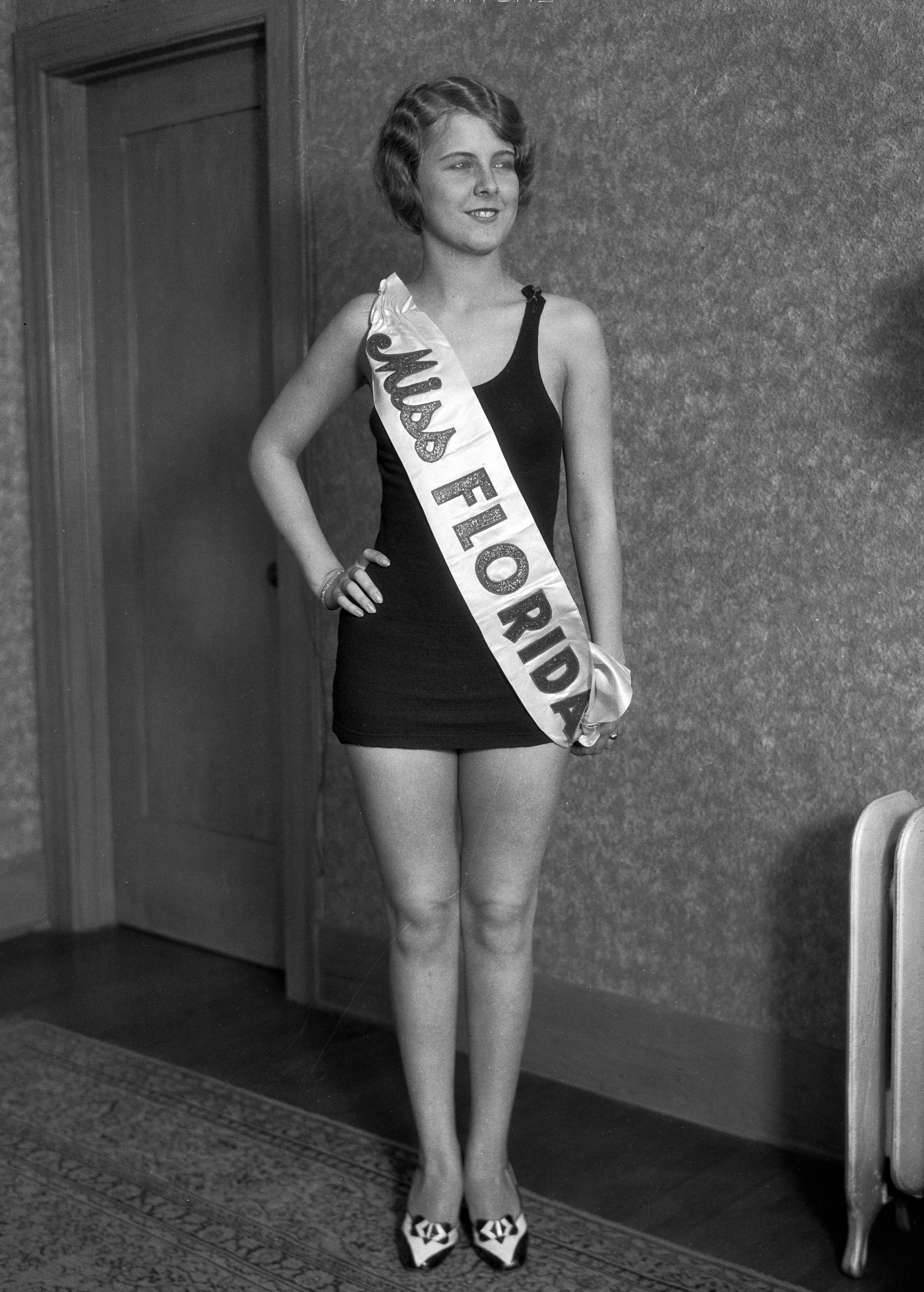
Williams in Los Angeles, 1929

In 1927, she won the Miss Florida beauty contest, and became first runner-up in the Miss United States contest.

Her film career began with a role was in Joy Street (1929) for the William Fox Film corporation. As she was 16 at the time, her contract needed to be validated by the California court system. She was chaperoned by her mother, A. G. Williams. In 1929, at the age of 18, she was married to William Thomas Ince, a son of a movie producer. She took the name Ada Ince, which appeared in her subsequent film credits.

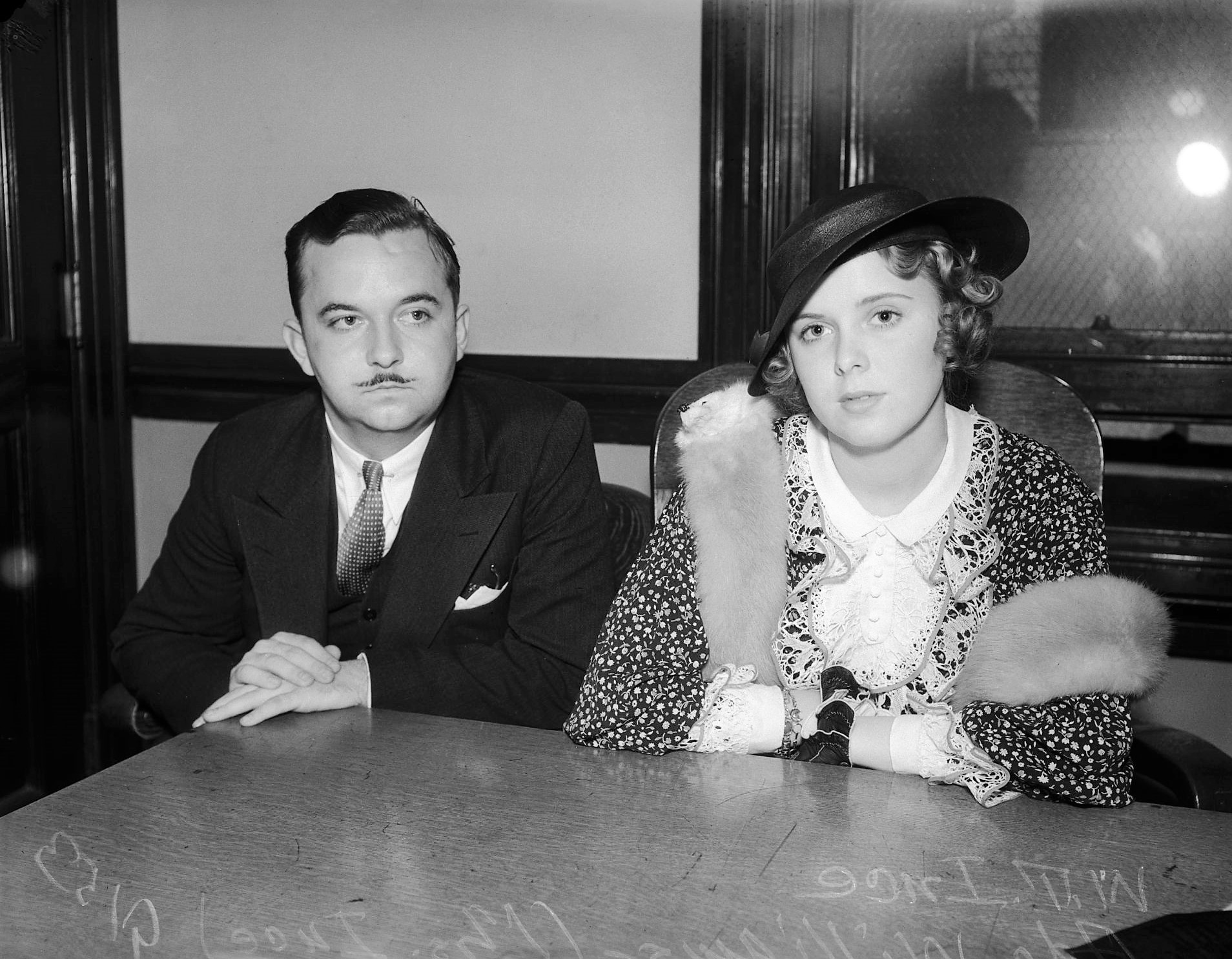
William T. and Ada Williams Ince on the day of their divorce, Friday, April 13, 1934

They were divorced in 1934. The following year, she was married to Ray Dodge, a middle-distance runner who competed in the 1924 Summer Olympics. Their daughters were named Diana Ada and Darlene Rae Dodge.

== Filmography ==
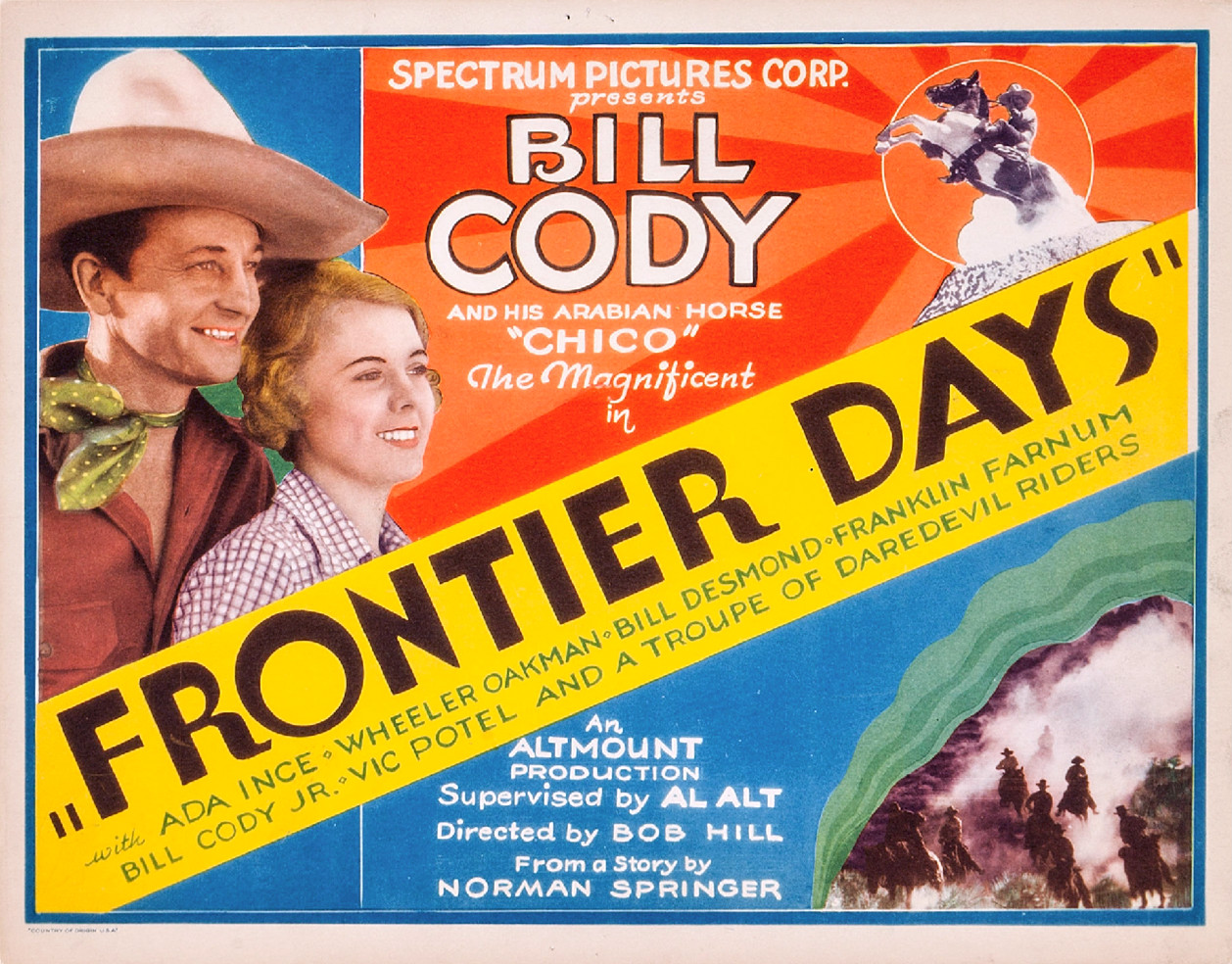
Ince with Bill Cody in Frontier Days (1934)

- Joy Street (1929) as Beverly
- Common Clay (1930) as Hugh's sister
- The Vanishing Shadow (1934, Serial) as Gloria Grant
- The Fighting Rookie (1934) as Molly Malone
- Frontier Days (1934) as Beth Wilson
- Stolen Harmony (1935) as Girl in Sextette (uncredited)
- Rainbow's End (1935) as Gwen Gibson (final film role)
