= Ferdinand Friebe =

Austrian middle-distance runner

Personal information
- Nationality: Austrian
- Born: 2 February 1894
- Died: 30 March 1980 (aged 86)

Sport
- Sport: Middle-distance running
- Event: 1500 metres

Ferdinand Friebe (2 February 1894 – 30 March 1980) was an Austrian middle-distance runner. He competed in the men's 1500 metres at the 1924 Summer Olympics.
