= Malcolm Boyd (athlete) =

Australian middle-distance runner

Personal information
- Nationality: Australian
- Born: 6 September 1896
- Died: 11 May 1960 (aged 63)

Sport
- Sport: Middle-distance running
- Event: 800 metres

Malcolm Boyd (6 September 1896 – 11 May 1960) was an Australian middle-distance runner. He competed in the men's 800 metres at the 1924 Summer Olympics.
