= Wilhelm Ladewig =

German decathlete

Personal information
- Nationality: German
- Born: 8 October 1906; Dargosław, Poland
- Died: 20 July 1979 (aged 72); Düsseldorf, West Germany

Sport
- Sport: Athletics
- Event: Decathlon

Wilhelm Ladewig (8 October 1906 – 20 July 1979) was a German athlete. He competed in the men's decathlon at the 1928 Summer Olympics.
