= Norman McEachern =

Irish middle-distance runner

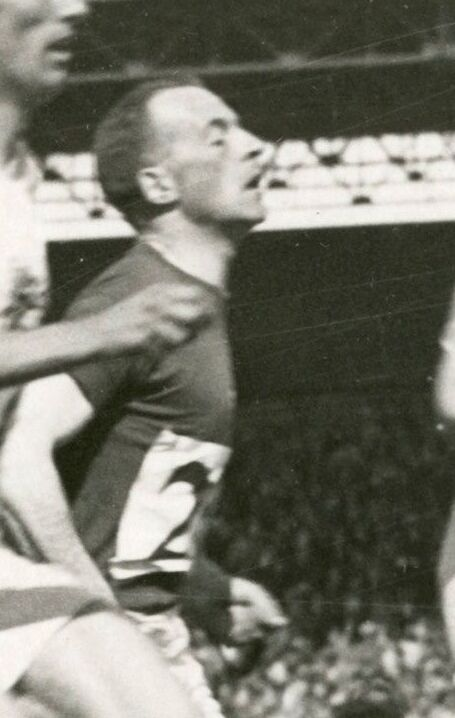
- Norman McEachern in 1928

Personal information
- Nationality: Irish
- Born: 5 December 1899
- Died: 19 March 1986 (aged 86)

Sport
- Sport: Middle-distance running
- Event: 800 metres
- Club: Clonliffe Harriers
Medal record
Representing Ireland
Tailteann Games
| Gold medal – first place | 1924 Dublin | 800 metres |

Norman McEachern (5 December 1899 – 19 March 1986) was an Irish middle-distance runner. He competed in the 800 metres at the 1924 Summer Olympics and the 1928 Summer Olympics.
