= Ferruccio Bruni =

Italian middle-distance runner

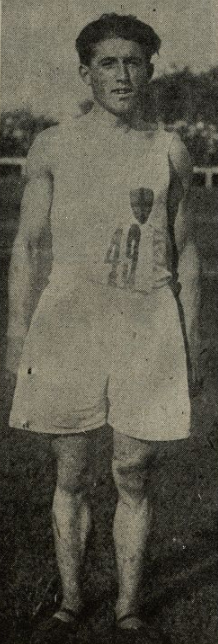
- Ferruccio Bruni

Personal information
- Nationality: Italian
- Born: 12 July 1899 Camisano Vicentino, Italy
- Died: 16 August 1971 (aged 72) Santa Fe, Argentina

Sport
- Country: Italy
- Sport: Athletics
- Event: Middle-distance running

Ferruccio Bruni (13 July 1899 – 16 August 1971) was an Italian middle-distance runner who competed at the 1924 Summer Olympics,
