= Douglas Lowe (athlete) =

British athlete

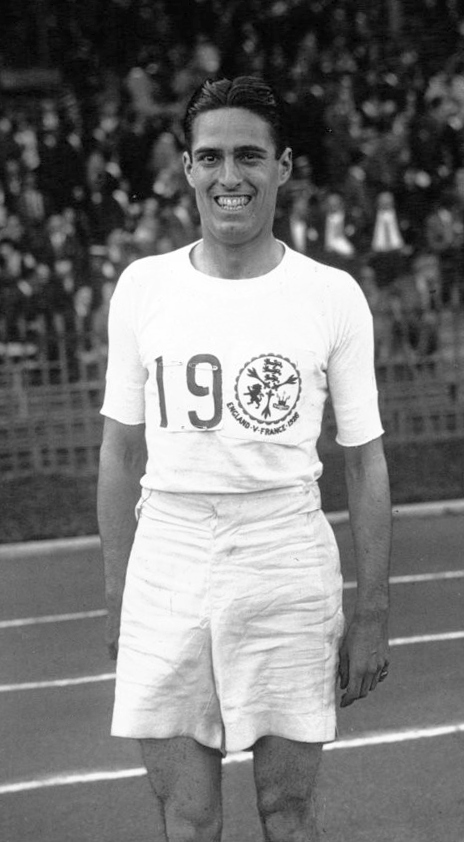
- Douglas Lowe in 1926

Personal information
- Born: 7 August 1902 Manchester, England
- Died: 30 March 1981 (aged 78) Cranbrook, Kent, England
- Education: University of Cambridge
- Height: 1.83 m (6 ft 0 in)
- Weight: 70 kg (154 lb)

Sport
- Sport: Athletics
- Event: 400–1500 m
- Club: University of Cambridge AC; Achilles Club

Achievements and titles
- Personal bests: 400 m – 48.5 (1927); 800 m – 1:51.2 (1928); 1500 m – 3:57.0 (1924)
Medal record
Representing United Kingdom
Olympic Games
Gold medal – first place	1924 Paris	800 metres
Gold medal – first place	1928 Amsterdam	800 metres

Douglas Gordon Arthur Lowe (7 August 1902 – 30 March 1981) was a British double Olympic Games champion, winning gold medals in 1924 and 1928. On both occasions he set British 800-metres records of 1:52.4 and 1:51.8 respectively, the latter also being an Olympic record.

== Biography ==
Born in Manchester, Douglas Lowe first attended Harrow but moved at the age of 14 to Highgate School, where unusually he was made Head Boy for two years before leaving in July 1921. An all-round school sportsman, he excelled as a middle distance runner, winning the Public Schools' 880 yd (805 m) title in 1920. Later, at Pembroke College, Cambridge, where he studied medieval and modern languages, he played football and won the 880 yd (805 m) against Oxford in 1922 and 1923, and both the mile (1609 m) and the quarter-mile (402 m) race against them in 1924.

In the 1924 Summer Olympics in Paris, Lowe won the 800 metres gold medal in a new European record time of 1:52.4. He beat the fellow Cambridge runner H. B. Stallard, who had been considered the pre-race favourite. Stallard suffered a leg injury and could only finish fourth. Lowe also came fourth in the 1,500 metres in a time of 3:57.0.

Lowe was defeated in a famous 880 yards race with Germany's Otto Peltzer at the 1926 AAA Championships. Peltzer won by three yards in a time of 1:51.6 with Lowe (untimed but estimated at 1:52.0) also inside the world record of 1:52.2.

Lowe was a national 440 yards champion and national 880 yards champion after winning the AAA Championships title at both the 1927 AAA Championships and 1928 AAA Championships.

At the Amsterdam Olympics Lowe won the 800 metres in a personal best performance of 1:51.8, a full second and eight yards ahead of a world class field. He also anchored the British 4×400 metres relay team that finished 5th.

Lowe set a world record of 1:10.6 for 600 yards in 1926, a distance then recognized by the IAAF for record purposes. His other personal bests included: 440 yards – 48.8 (1927); 800 metres – 1:51.2 (1928); 1,500 metres – 3:57.0 (1924); 1 mile – 4:21.0 (1925).

Lowe retired from athletics at the end of the 1928 season but played 9 times for Isthmian League side Casuals FC in the 1928/29 season including in two friendlies against Oxford and Cambridge Universities. He also took up law at the Inner Temple in London, where he was elected a Bencher in 1955. First elected to the Bar Council in 1958, he was President from 1961 to 1964. He was appointed QC in 1964, and was made Recorder of Lincoln in the same year. He was a Governor of Highgate School from 1939 to 1975.

He was Chairman of the Universities Athletic Union from 1928 to 1936, Honorary Secretary of the Amateur Athletic Association from 1931 to 1938, a Council member of the British Olympic Association in 1928–38 and an IAAF representative in 1931–40.

Prior to the making of the film Chariots of Fire, Lowe's support was sought, but declined. In consequence, the fictional character of Lindsay was created in his stead.

== Sources ==
- Quercentani, Roberto & Kok, Nejat (1992): Wizards of the Middle Distances: A history of the 800 metres
- Watman, Mel (1981): Encyclopedia of Track and Field Athletics
- Peter Matthews & Ian Buchanan (1995): All-Time Greats of British & Irish Sport
- Wallechinsky, David (2000): The Complete Book of the Olympics
- Lowe, DGA and Porritt, AE (Longmans Green, 1929) : Athletics
- Lowe, DGA (Pitman, 1936): Track and Field Athletics
