= János Paizs =

Hungarian sprinter

Personal information
- Nationality: Hungarian
- Born: 2 April 1907
- Died: 16 March 1978 (aged 70)

Sport
- Sport: Sprinting
- Event: 100 metres

János Paizs (2 April 1907 – 16 March 1978) was a Hungarian sprinter. He competed in the men's 100 metres at the 1928 Summer Olympics.
