= Harry Houghton (athlete) =

British athlete

Personal information
- Full name: Harold Houghton
- Nationality: British
- Born: 9 January 1901 Preston
- Died: 12 June 1986 (aged 85) Birmingham

Sport
- Sport: Athletics
- Event: Middle-distance running

Harry Houghton (9 January 1901 – 12 June 1986) was a British athlete who competed at the 1924 Summer Olympics and the 1928 Summer Olympics.
