= René Wiriath =

French middle-distance runner

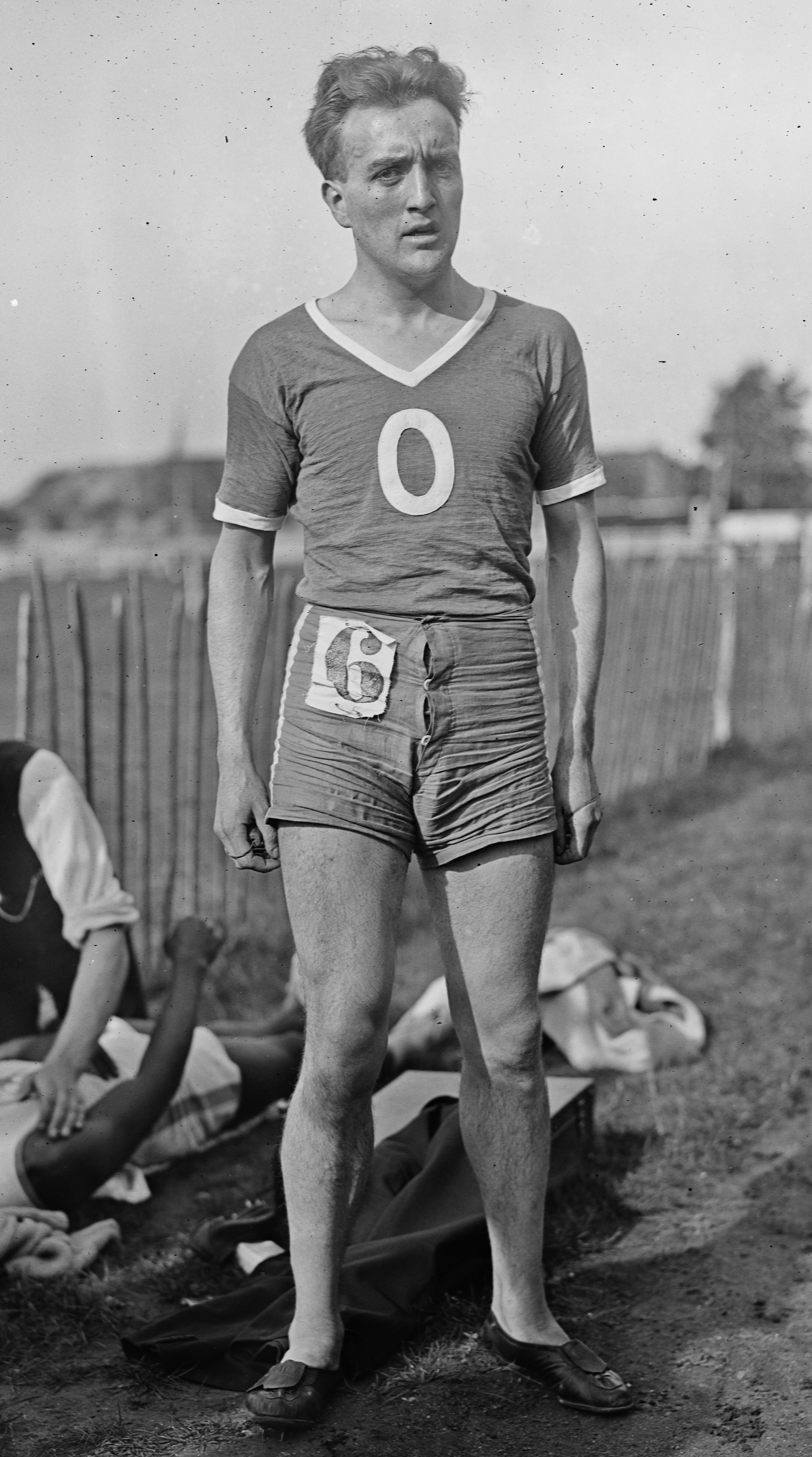
- René Wiriath in 1924.

Personal information
- Nationality: French
- Born: 1 December 1899
- Died: 28 March 1942 (aged 42)

Sport
- Sport: Middle-distance running
- Event: 800 metres

René Wiriath (1 December 1899 – 28 March 1942) was a French middle-distance runner. He competed in the men's 800 metres at the 1924 Summer Olympics.
