= Albert Larsen =

Danish middle-distance runner

Personal information
- Nationality: Danish
- Born: 5 April 1901
- Died: 5 September 1985 (aged 84)

Sport
- Sport: Middle-distance running
- Event: 800 metres

Albert Larsen (5 April 1901 – 5 September 1985) was a Danish middle-distance runner. He competed in the 800 metres at the 1924 Summer Olympics and the 1928 Summer Olympics.
