= László Magdics =

Hungarian sprinter

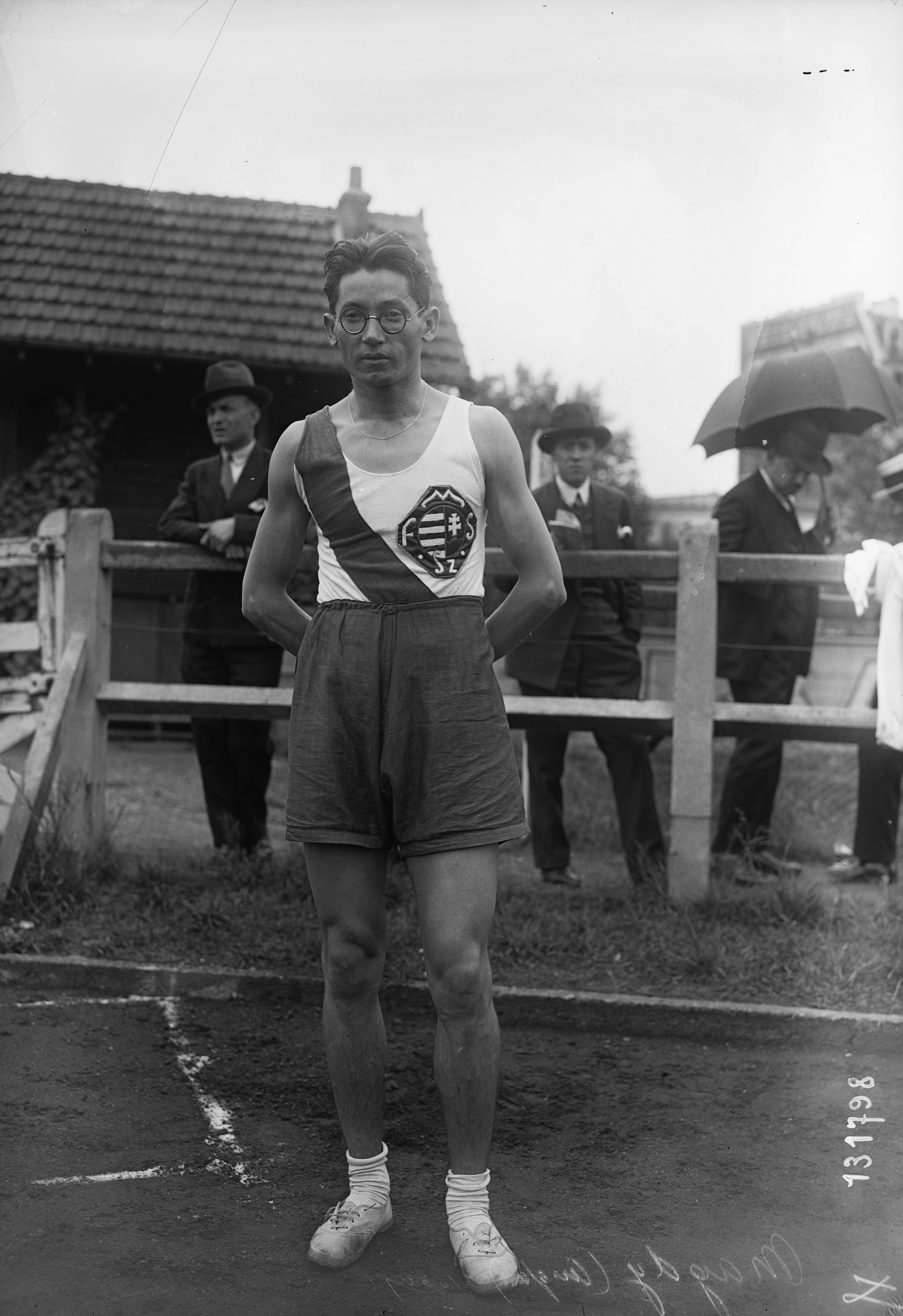
- László Magdics in 1928.

Personal information
- Nationality: Hungarian
- Born: 27 December 1902
- Died: 30 July 1972 (aged 69)

Sport
- Sport: Sprinting
- Event: 400 metres

László Magdics (27 December 1902 – 30 July 1972) was a Hungarian sprinter. He competed in the men's 400 metres at the 1928 Summer Olympics.
