= Athletics at the 1924 Summer Olympics – Men's 3000 metres team race =

Men's 3000 metres team race at the Games of the VIII Olympiad
- Venue: Stade Olympique Yves-du-Manoir
- Dates: July 11, 1924 (semifinals); July 13, 1924 (final)
- Competitors: 44 from 9 nations

Medalists
1st place, gold medalist(s)		Katz, Nurmi, Ritola; Liewendahl, Seppälä, Tala; Finland
2nd place, silver medalist(s)		Johnston, Macdonald, Webber; Clark, Porter, Seagrove; Great Britain
3rd place, bronze medalist(s)		Cox, Kirby, Tibbetts; Connolly, Larrivee, Ray; United States

The men's 3000 metres team event was part of the track and field athletics programme at the 1924 Summer Olympics. It was the third and last appearance of a 3000-metre team race event after the debut in 1912, but the sixth time that a team contest was arranged at the Olympics. The competition was held on Friday, July 11, 1924, and on Sunday, July 13, 1924. Forty-four runners from nine nations competed.

== Results ==
=== Semifinals ===
Both semi-finals were held on Friday, July 11, 1924, and the first heat started at 3:15 p.m. The top two teams in each heat qualified for the final.

Semifinal 1

Team result

Place	Team	Scores				Qual.
Place	Team	1	2	3	Total	Qual.
1	Finland	1	2	3	6	Q
2	Great Britain	4	5	6	15	Q
3	Norway	8	9	10	27	
4	Italy	7	11	13	31	
5	Poland	12	14	15	41	

Individual race result

Place	Athlete	Score
1	Paavo Nurmi (FIN)	1
2	Ville Ritola (FIN)	2
3	Sameli Tala (FIN)	3
4	Walter Porter (GBR)	4
5	Herbert Johnston (GBR)	5
6	Bertram Macdonald (GBR)	6
7	Angelo Davoli (ITA)	7
8	Hans Gundhus (NOR)	8
9	William Seagrove (GBR)	—
10	Nils Andersen (NOR)	9
11	Haakon Jansen (NOR)	10
12	Frej Liewendahl (FIN)	—
13	Elias Katz (FIN)	—
14	Ferruccio Bruni (ITA)	11
15	Johan Badendyck (NOR)	—
16	Stanisław Ziffer (POL)	12
17	Giovanni Garaventa (ITA)	13
18	Julian Łukaszewicz (POL)	14
19	Stefan Szelestowski (POL)	15
—	Eino Seppälä (FIN)	DNF
—	Arthur Clark (GBR)	DNF
—	George Webber (GBR)	DNF
—	Ernesto Ambrosini (ITA)	DNF

Semifinal 2

Team result:

Place	Team	Scores				Qual.
Place	Team	1	2	3	Total	Qual.
1	United States	2	3	4	9	Q
2	France	5	6	7	18	Q
3	Sweden	1	8	12	21	
4	Spain	9	10	11	30	

Individual race result:

Place	Athlete	Score
1	Edvin Wide (SWE)	1
2	Bill Cox (USA)	2
3	Edward Kirby (USA)	3
4	Willard Tibbetts (USA)	4
5	Paul Bontemps (FRA)	5
6	Lucien Duquesne (FRA)	6
7	Camille Barbaud (FRA)	7
8	James Connolly (USA)	—
9	Axel Eriksson (SWE)	8
10	Armand Burtin (FRA)	—
11	Joie Ray (USA)	—
12	Jesús Diéguez (ESP)	9
13	José Andía (ESP)	10
14	Léonard Mascaux (FRA)	—
15	Fabián Velasco (ESP)	11
16	Jean Keller (FRA)	—
17	Miguel Palau (ESP)	—
18	Joaquín Miquel (ESP)	—
19	Sven Emil Lundgren (SWE)	12
20	Leo Larrivee (USA)	—
21	Stig Reuterswärd (SWE)	—

=== Final ===
The final was held on Sunday, July 13, 1924, and started at 4:45 p.m.

Team result:

Place	Team	Scores			
Place	Team	1	2	3	Total
1	Finland	1	2	5	8
2	Great Britain	3	4	7	14
3	United States	6	8	11	25
4	France	9	10	12	31

Individual race result:

Place	Athlete	Score
1	Paavo Nurmi (FIN)	1
2	Ville Ritola (FIN)	2
3	Bertram Macdonald (GBR)	3
4	Herbert Johnston (GBR)	4
5	Elias Katz (FIN)	5
6	Edward Kirby (USA)	6
7	George Webber (GBR)	7
8	Bill Cox (USA)	8
9	Paul Bontemps (FRA)	9
10	Walter Porter (GBR)	—
11	Armand Burtin (FRA)	10
12	Willard Tibbetts (USA)	11
13	Sameli Tala (FIN)	—
14	Arthur Clark (GBR)	—
15	Léonard Mascaux (FRA)	12
16	William Seagrove (GBR)	—
17	Leo Larrivee (USA)	—
18	Joie Ray (USA)	—
19	Camille Barbaud (FRA)	—
—	Frej Liewendahl (FIN)	DNF
—	James Connolly (USA)	DNF
—	Jean Keller (FRA)	DNF
—	Lucien Duquesne (FRA)	DNF
