= Walter Porter (runner) =

British athlete

Personal information
- Full name: Walter Harold Porter
- Nationality: British (English)
- Born: 30 February 1903 York, England
- Died: 3 August 1979 (aged 75) York, England

Sport
- Sport: Athletics
- Event: Middle-distance running
- Club: York Harriers & Athletic Club
Medal record
Olympic Games
Silver medal – second place	1924 Paris	3000 metres team race

Walter Harold Porter (30 August 1903 – 3 August 1979) was a British athlete who competed at the 1924 Summer Olympics.

== Career ==
Porter was the Yorkshire champion at 880 yards, the mile, and 3 miles and finished third behind William Seagrove in the a mile event at the 1924 AAA Championships. Shortly afterwards he was selected for the British team to compete at the 1924 Olympic Games in Paris, winning a silver medal in the 3000 metres team race.
