= Herbert Johnston =

British long-distance runner (1902–1967)

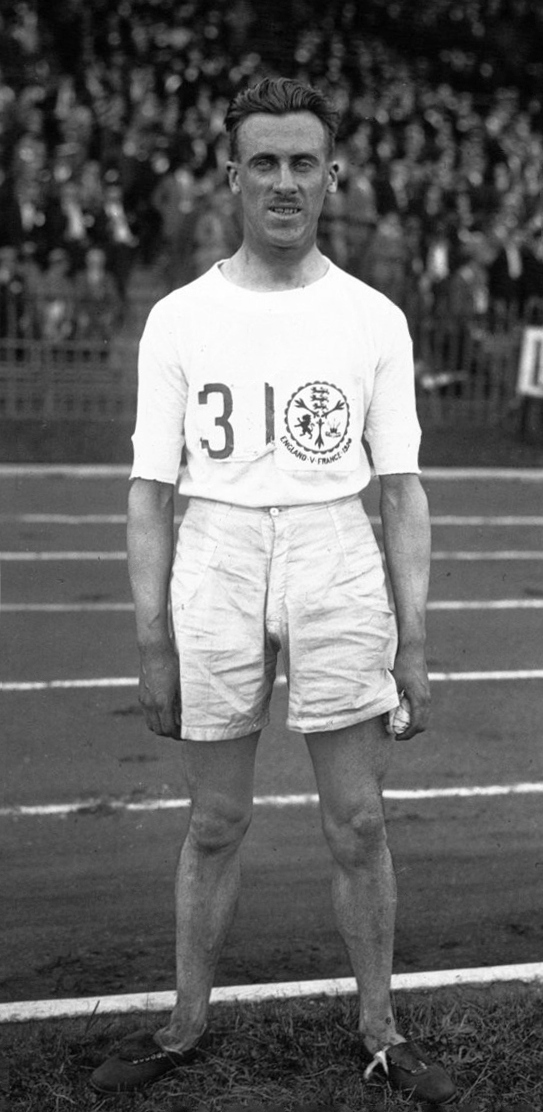
- Herbert Johnston in 1926

Personal information
- Born: 16 April 1902 Dulwich, London
- Died: 5 April 1967 (aged 64) Harold Wood, London
- Height: 1.79 m (5 ft 10 in)
- Weight: 73 kg (161 lb)

Sport
- Sport: Athletics
- Event(s): 200 m, 400 m
- Club: Herne Hill Harriers, Mitcham

Achievements and titles
- Personal best(s): Mile – 4:21.8 (1926); 3000 m – 8:45.2 (1924); 5000 m – 15:00.4 (1926)
Medal record
Representing United Kingdom
Olympic Games
Silver medal – second place	1924 Paris	3000 metre team

Herbert Arthur Johnston (16 April 1902 – 5 April 1967) was a British runner who competed in events ranging from one to four miles.

== Career ==
Johnston won a silver medal in the 3000 metre team event at the 1924 Summer Olympics, together with Bertram Macdonald and George Webber. At the 1928 Summer Olympics he finished eighth in the 5000 metre race.

Johnston finished second behind William Seagrove in the 1 mile event at the 1924 AAA Championships and finished second behind Jack Webster in the 4 miles event at the 1926 AAA Championships.

He continued to contribute to British athletics after he retired from running by coaching several prominent long-distance runners including Jim Peters, who held the world record in the marathon for six years, as well as Stan Cox and Fred Norris. He was a founding member of Herne Hill Harriers and earned his living in the insurance business.
