= Dave Shade =

American boxer (1902–1983)

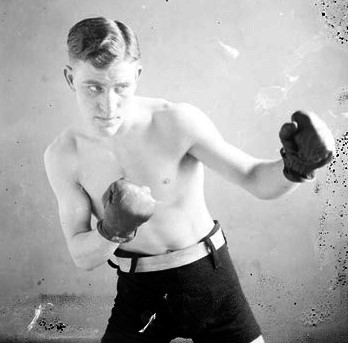

Personal information
- Born: Charles D. Shade; March 3, 1902 Vallejo, California, U.S.
- Died: June 23, 1983 (aged 81) Concord, California, U.S.
- Height: 5 ft 8 in (1.73 m)
- Weight: Welterweight

Boxing career
- Reach: 71 in (180 cm)
- Stance: Orthodox

Boxing record
- Total fights: 251
- Wins: 156
- Win by KO: 17
- Losses: 29
- Draws: 62
- No contests: 4

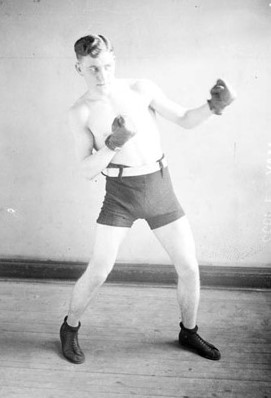
Shade in fighting pose

Dave Shade (March 3, 1902 – June 23, 1983) was an American boxer who was active from 1918 to the 1935 and amassed a total of nearly 250 bouts fought during the course of his career. His famous low crouching bob-and-weave style earned him a reputation as one of the cleverest boxers of his time period. Although Shade never captured a world title, he fared very well against the best boxers of his era including the likes of Mickey Walker, Jack Britton, Maxie Rosenbloom, Len Harvey and Jimmy Slattery. Shade was inducted into the International Boxing Hall of Fame in 2011.

== Professional boxing record ==
All information in this section is derived from BoxRec, unless otherwise stated.

=== Official Record ===
251 fights	132 wins	28 losses
By knockout	17	2
By decision	113	25
By disqualification	2	1
Draws	61	
No contests	4	
Newspaper decisions/draws	26	

All newspaper decisions are officially regarded as "no decision" bouts and are not counted in the win/loss/draw column.

No.	Result	Record	Opponent	Type	Round(s)	Date	Age	Location	Notes
251	Win	132–28–61 (30)	Paulie Sykes	UD	10	Dec 2, 1935	33 years, 274 days	Auditorium, Pittsfield, Massachusetts, U.S.	
250	Loss	131–28–61 (30)	Johnny Rossi	UD	10	Mar 18, 1935	33 years, 15 days	Auditorium, Pittsfield, Massachusetts, U.S.	
249	Loss	131–27–61 (30)	Al Gainer	UD	10	Jan 21, 1935	32 years, 324 days	Auditorium, Pittsfield, Massachusetts, U.S.	
248	Win	131–26–61 (30)	Bob Turner	SD	10	Jan 21, 1935	32 years, 324 days	Auditorium, Pittsfield, Massachusetts, U.S.	
247	Win	130–26–61 (30)	Joe Kaminski	UD	10	Nov 26, 1934	32 years, 268 days	Auditorium, Pittsfield, Massachusetts, U.S.	
246	Draw	129–26–61 (30)	Al Rossi	MD	10	Oct 15, 1934	32 years, 226 days	Auditorium, Pittsfield, Massachusetts, U.S.	
245	Loss	129–26–60 (30)	Fred Henneberry	PTS	15	Jan 29, 1934	31 years, 332 days	Sydney Stadium, Sydney, New South Wales, Australia	
244	Win	129–25–60 (30)	Ambrose Palmer	DQ	6 (15)	Jan 15, 1934	31 years, 318 days	Sydney Stadium, Sydney, New South Wales, Australia	Low blow
243	Win	128–25–60 (30)	Fred Henneberry	PTS	15	Dec 26, 1933	31 years, 298 days	Sydney Stadium, Sydney, New South Wales, Australia	
242	Loss	127–25–60 (30)	Ambrose Palmer	PTS	15	Nov 27, 1933	31 years, 269 days	Sydney Stadium, Sydney, New South Wales, Australia	
241	Draw	127–24–60 (30)	Henry Firpo	PTS	10	Oct 29, 1933	31 years, 240 days	Houston, Texas, U.S.	
240	Win	127–24–59 (30)	Jack Gibbs	PTS	10	Oct 12, 1933	31 years, 223 days	City Auditorium, Houston, Texas, U.S.	
239	Draw	126–24–59 (30)	Rosy Baker	PTS	10	Jun 30, 1933	31 years, 119 days	Red Bird Stadium, Columbus, Ohio, U.S.	
238	Win	126–24–58 (30)	Henry Firpo	NWS	10	May 5, 1933	31 years, 63 days	Jefferson County Armory, Louisville, Kentucky, U.S.	
237	Win	126–24–58 (29)	Sammy Slaughter	PTS	10	Nov 11, 1932	30 years, 253 days	Chicago Stadium, Chicago, Illinois, U.S.	
236	Win	125–24–58 (29)	Norman Conrad	SD	10	Aug 23, 1932	30 years, 173 days	Fenway Park, Boston, Massachusetts, U.S.	
235	Win	124–24–58 (29)	Charley Horn	PTS	6	Jul 22, 1932	30 years, 141 days	Long Beach Stadium, New York City, New York, U.S.	
234	Win	123–24–58 (29)	Ray Tramblie	PTS	10	May 3, 1932	30 years, 61 days	Armory, Indianapolis, Indiana, U.S.	
233	Win	122–24–58 (29)	Jack Kilbourne	PTS	10	Apr 21, 1932	30 years, 49 days	White City Arena, Chicago, Illinois, U.S.	
232	Loss	121–24–58 (29)	Sammy Slaughter	UD	10	Apr 11, 1932	30 years, 39 days	Auditorium, Milwaukee, Wisconsin, U.S.	
231	Win	121–23–58 (29)	Angel Clivilles	PTS	10	Feb 23, 1932	29 years, 357 days	Auditorium, Milwaukee, Wisconsin, U.S.	
230	Win	120–23–58 (29)	Henry Firpo	PTS	10	Feb 8, 1932	29 years, 342 days	White City Arena, Chicago, Illinois, U.S.	
229	Win	119–23–58 (29)	Joey LaGrey	PTS	10	Jan 22, 1932	29 years, 325 days	Madison Square Garden, New York City, New York, U.S.	
228	Win	118–23–58 (29)	Al Gainer	PTS	10	Nov 5, 1931	29 years, 247 days	State Armory, Waterbury, Connecticut, U.S.	
227	Win	117–23–58 (29)	Ben Jeby	UD	12	Oct 2, 1931	29 years, 213 days	Madison Square Garden, New York City, New York, U.S.	
226	Draw	116–23–58 (29)	Ben Jeby	PTS	10	Sep 8, 1931	29 years, 189 days	Queensboro Stadium, New York City, New York, U.S.	
225	Win	116–23–57 (29)	Willie Oster	PTS	10	Aug 17, 1931	29 years, 167 days	White City Arena, Chicago, Illinois, U.S.	
224	Win	115–23–57 (29)	Leo Larrivee	PTS	10	Apr 14, 1931	29 years, 42 days	Arena, Boston, Massachusetts, U.S.	Not to be confused with Leo Larrivee
223	Loss	114–23–57 (29)	Tiger Thomas	UD	10	Feb 12, 1931	28 years, 346 days	South Main Street Armory, Wilkes-Barre, Pennsylvania, U.S.	
222	Win	114–22–57 (29)	Joe Anderson	TKO	10 (10)	Jan 9, 1931	28 years, 312 days	Madison Square Garden, New York City, New York, U.S.	
221	Draw	113–22–57 (29)	Jack Hood	PTS	12	Dec 4, 1930	28 years, 276 days	Royal Albert Hall, Kensington, London, England, U.K.	
220	Draw	113–22–56 (29)	Jack Hood	PTS	12	Oct 28, 1930	28 years, 239 days	Royal Albert Hall, Kensington, London, England, U.K.	
219	Loss	113–22–55 (29)	Len Harvey	PTS	15	Sep 29, 1930	28 years, 210 days	Royal Albert Hall, Kensington, London, England, U.K.	
218	Win	113–21–55 (29)	Joe Anderson	PTS	10	Aug 5, 1930	28 years, 155 days	Braves Field, Boston, Massachusetts, U.S.	
217	Win	112–21–55 (29)	Ace Hudkins	PTS	10	May 27, 1930	28 years, 85 days	Olympic Auditorium, Los Angeles, California, U.S.	
216	NC	111–21–55 (29)	Mike Hector	NC	9 (10)	May 6, 1930	28 years, 64 days	Olympic Auditorium, Los Angeles, California, U.S.	
215	Draw	111–21–55 (28)	Joe Anderson	PTS	10	Apr 15, 1930	28 years, 43 days	Olympic Auditorium, Los Angeles, California, U.S.	
214	Win	111–21–54 (28)	Jack Kilbourne	PTS	10	Mar 28, 1930	28 years, 25 days	Coliseum, San Diego, California, U.S.	
213	Win	110–21–54 (28)	Young George Dixon	PTS	6	Feb 27, 1930	27 years, 361 days	Greenwich Coliseum, Tacoma, Washington, U.S.	
212	Win	109–21–54 (28)	Young Johnny Burns	PTS	10	Feb 19, 1930	27 years, 353 days	Auditorium, Oakland, California, U.S.	
211	Win	108–21–54 (28)	Cowboy Jack Willis	PTS	10	Feb 10, 1930	27 years, 344 days	Dreamland Auditorium, San Francisco, California, U.S.	
210	Win	107–21–54 (28)	Joe Roche	PTS	10	Jan 24, 1930	27 years, 327 days	Dreamland Auditorium, San Francisco, California, U.S.	
209	Win	106–21–54 (28)	Dick Evans	KO	2 (10)	Nov 15, 1929	27 years, 257 days	Beach Arena, Miami Beach, Florida, U.S.	
208	Win	105–21–54 (28)	Joe Roche	PTS	10	Oct 2, 1929	27 years, 213 days	Coliseum, Chicago, Illinois, U.S.	
207	Win	104–21–54 (28)	Young George Dixon	PTS	10	Aug 21, 1929	27 years, 171 days	Arcadia Pavilion, Oakland, California, U.S.	
206	Win	103–21–54 (28)	Rene De Vos	PTS	10	Jul 18, 1929	27 years, 137 days	Yankee Stadium, New York City, New York, U.S.	
205	Win	102–21–54 (28)	Leo Mitchell	PTS	8	Jul 12, 1929	27 years, 131 days	Long Beach Stadium, New York City, New York, U.S.	
204	Draw	101–21–54 (28)	Esteban Gallard	PTS	12	Apr 30, 1929	27 years, 58 days	Parque Romano, Buenos Aires, Distrito Federal, Argentina	
203	Win	101–21–53 (28)	Manuel K.O. Brissett	PTS	12	Mar 30, 1929	27 years, 27 days	Buenos Aires, Distrito Federal, Argentina	
202	Loss	100–21–53 (28)	Ray Still	DQ	7 (10)	Dec 27, 1928	26 years, 299 days	Arena, Trenton, New Jersey, U.S.	
201	Win	100–20–53 (28)	Arthur Flynn	PTS	10	Dec 7, 1928	26 years, 279 days	Boston Garden, Boston, Massachusetts, U.S.	
200	Win	99–20–53 (28)	Bobby Williams	KO	3 (10)	Nov 22, 1928	26 years, 264 days	Armory, Grand Rapids, Michigan, U.S.	
199	Loss	98–20–53 (28)	Rene De Vos	UD	10	Nov 2, 1928	26 years, 244 days	Coliseum, Chicago, Illinois, U.S.	
198	Win	98–19–53 (28)	Cowboy Jack Willis	PTS	10	Oct 15, 1928	26 years, 226 days	White City Arena, Chicago, Illinois, U.S.	
197	Win	97–19–53 (28)	Joe Anderson	PTS	10	Aug 20, 1928	26 years, 170 days	Midway Gardens, Chicago, Illinois, U.S.	
196	Loss	96–19–53 (28)	Rene De Vos	PTS	10	Aug 1, 1928	26 years, 151 days	Outdoor Arena, Philadelphia, Pennsylvania, U.S.	
195	Win	96–18–53 (28)	Tiger Johnny Cline	PTS	10	Jul 23, 1928	26 years, 142 days	Muehlebach Field, Kansas City, Missouri, U.S.	
194	Win	95–18–53 (28)	Bert Colima	KO	7 (10)	Jul 9, 1928	26 years, 128 days	Midway Gardens, Chicago, Illinois, U.S.	
193	Win	94–18–53 (28)	George Courtney	PTS	10	Jun 15, 1928	26 years, 104 days	Coney Island Stadium, New York City, New York, U.S.	
192	Win	93–18–53 (28)	Tiger Johnny Cline	NWS	10	Jun 7, 1928	26 years, 96 days	Coliseum, Davenport, Iowa, U.S.	
191	Win	93–18–53 (27)	Imey Garfinkle	NWS	10	May 29, 1928	26 years, 87 days	Muehlebach Field, Kansas City, Missouri, U.S.	
190	Win	93–18–53 (26)	Del Fontaine	PTS	10	Mar 19, 1928	26 years, 16 days	White City Arena, Chicago, Illinois, U.S.	
189	Win	92–18–53 (26)	Charley Long	PTS	10	Feb 29, 1928	25 years, 363 days	Auditorium, Oakland, California, U.S.	
188	Win	91–18–53 (26)	Al Webster	PTS	10	Feb 21, 1928	25 years, 355 days	Stockyards Stadium, Denver, Colorado, U.S.	
187	Loss	90–18–53 (26)	Joe Anderson	PTS	10	Feb 7, 1928	25 years, 341 days	Olympic Auditorium, Los Angeles, California, U.S.	
186	Draw	90–17–53 (26)	Jack McVey	PTS	12	Oct 12, 1927	25 years, 223 days	Public Hall, Cleveland, Ohio, U.S.	
185	Win	90–17–52 (26)	Al Webster	PTS	10	Sep 26, 1927	25 years, 207 days	Tulsa, Oklahoma, U.S.	
184	Win	89–17–52 (26)	Warnie Smith	PTS	10	Sep 5, 1927	25 years, 186 days	Convention Hall, Kansas City, Missouri, U.S.	
183	Win	88–17–52 (26)	Joe Anderson	PTS	10	Aug 11, 1927	25 years, 161 days	Yankee Stadium, New York City, New York, U.S.	
182	Win	87–17–52 (26)	Willie Walker	PTS	12	Aug 6, 1927	25 years, 156 days	Rocky Point Natatorium, Providence, Rhode Island, U.S.	
181	Win	86–17–52 (26)	Young George Dixon	PTS	10	Jun 21, 1927	25 years, 110 days	Armory, Portland, Oregon, U.S.	
180	Win	85–17–52 (26)	Cowboy Jack Willis	PTS	10	Jun 15, 1927	25 years, 104 days	Auditorium, Oakland, California, U.S.	
179	Win	84–17–52 (26)	Bert Colima	PTS	10	May 24, 1927	25 years, 82 days	Olympic Auditorium, Los Angeles, California, U.S.	
178	Win	83–17–52 (26)	Phil Krug	PTS	10	Apr 12, 1927	25 years, 40 days	Coliseum, Chicago, Illinois, U.S.	
177	Draw	82–17–52 (26)	Lou Scozza	PTS	10	Apr 1, 1927	25 years, 29 days	Broadway Auditorium, Buffalo, New York, U.S.	
176	Win	82–17–51 (26)	Tillie Herman	TKO	7 (10)	Mar 17, 1927	25 years, 14 days	Coliseum, Chicago, Illinois, U.S.	
175	Win	81–17–51 (26)	Walcott Langford	PTS	10	Feb 24, 1927	24 years, 358 days	Coliseum, Chicago, Illinois, U.S.	
174	Win	80–17–51 (26)	Vic McLaughlin	TKO	6 (10)	Feb 12, 1927	24 years, 346 days	Walker A.C., New York City, New York, U.S.	
173	Win	79–17–51 (26)	Johnny Oakey	NWS	10	Jan 28, 1927	24 years, 331 days	Convention Hall, Camden, New Jersey, U.S.	
172	Win	79–17–51 (25)	Bobby Barrett	PTS	10	Jul 12, 1926	24 years, 131 days	Shibe Park, Philadelphia, Pennsylvania, U.S.	
171	Win	78–17–51 (25)	Lew Chester	NWS	12	Jul 6, 1926	24 years, 125 days	Laurel Open-Air Arena, Newark, New Jersey, U.S.	
170	Loss	78–17–51 (24)	Maxie Rosenbloom	PTS	12	Jun 29, 1926	24 years, 118 days	Queensboro Stadium, New York City, New York, U.S.	
169	Loss	78–16–51 (24)	Maxie Rosenbloom	UD	10	Jun 5, 1926	24 years, 94 days	Queensboro Stadium, New York City, New York, U.S.	
168	Win	78–15–51 (24)	Frank Moody	PTS	10	Apr 23, 1926	24 years, 51 days	Arena, Syracuse, New York, U.S.	
167	NC	77–15–51 (24)	Frank Moody	NC	5 (10)	Apr 12, 1926	24 years, 40 days	Arena, Syracuse, New York, U.S.	Stopped for "stalling"
166	Win	77–15–51 (23)	Jack Conley	PTS	10	Feb 12, 1926	23 years, 346 days	Benjamin Field Arena, Tampa, Florida, U.S.	
165	Win	76–15–51 (23)	Jock Malone	NWS	10	Jan 15, 1926	23 years, 318 days	Auditorium, Saint Paul, Minnesota, U.S.	
164	Win	76–15–51 (22)	Roland Todd	PTS	10	Jan 1, 1926	23 years, 304 days	Madison Square Garden, New York City, New York, U.S.	
163	Win	75–15–51 (22)	Bermondsey Billy Wells	NWS	10	Oct 16, 1925	23 years, 227 days	Arena Gardens, Michigan, U.S.	
162	Loss	75–15–51 (21)	Mickey Walker	SD	15	Sep 21, 1925	23 years, 202 days	Yankee Stadium, New York City, New York, U.S.	For NYSAC, NBA, The Ring welterweight titles
161	Win	75–14–51 (21)	Frankie Schoell	PTS	10	Aug 8, 1925	23 years, 158 days	Recreation Park, San Francisco, California, U.S.	
160	Win	74–14–51 (21)	Morrie Schlaifer	UD	10	Jul 22, 1925	23 years, 141 days	Artillery Park, Wilkes-Barre, Pennsylvania, U.S.	
159	Win	73–14–51 (21)	Jimmy Slattery	TKO	3 (10)	Jul 2, 1925	23 years, 121 days	Polo Grounds, New York City, New York, U.S.	
158	Win	72–14–51 (21)	Osk Till	PTS	10	Mar 23, 1925	23 years, 20 days	Convention Hall, Rochester, New York, U.S.	
157	Win	71–14–51 (21)	Phil Krug	NWS	12	Dec 3, 1924	22 years, 275 days	1st Regiment Armory, Newark, New Jersey, U.S.	
156	Draw	71–14–51 (20)	Oakland Jimmy Duffy	PTS	4	Sep 1, 1924	22 years, 182 days	Oaks Ballpark, Emeryville, California, U.S.	
155	Draw	71–14–50 (20)	Bert Colima	PTS	4	Aug 12, 1924	22 years, 162 days	Arena, Vernon, California, U.S.	
154	Win	71–14–49 (20)	Joe Simonich	PTS	4	Jul 22, 1924	22 years, 141 days	Arena, Vernon, California, U.S.	
153	Loss	70–14–49 (20)	Bert Colima	PTS	4	Jul 15, 1924	22 years, 134 days	Arena, Vernon, California, U.S.	
152	Win	70–13–49 (20)	Warnie Smith	NWS	10	Jun 16, 1924	22 years, 105 days	Open-air Arena, East Chicago, Indiana, U.S.	
151	Win	70–13–49 (19)	Morrie Schlaifer	PTS	12	May 23, 1924	22 years, 81 days	Public Hall, Cleveland, Ohio, U.S.	
150	Draw	69–13–49 (19)	Pete Latzo	UD	10	May 19, 1924	22 years, 77 days	South Main Street Armory, Wilkes-Barre, Pennsylvania, U.S.	
149	Win	69–13–48 (19)	Augie Ratner	PTS	10	May 7, 1924	22 years, 65 days	Arena, Boston, Massachusetts, U.S.	
148	Win	68–13–48 (19)	Allentown Joe Gans	PTS	10	Apr 28, 1924	22 years, 56 days	South Main Street Armory, Wilkes-Barre, Pennsylvania, U.S.	
147	Win	67–13–48 (19)	Morrie Schlaifer	PTS	10	Apr 25, 1924	22 years, 53 days	City Auditorium, Omaha, Nebraska, U.S.	
146	Win	66–13–48 (19)	Frankie Schoell	PTS	10	Apr 14, 1924	22 years, 42 days	Broadway Auditorium, Buffalo, New York, U.S.	
145	Win	65–13–48 (19)	Bermondsey Billy Wells	NWS	10	Feb 18, 1924	21 years, 352 days	Auditorium, Saint Paul, Minnesota, U.S.	
144	Win	65–13–48 (18)	Ted Moore	PTS	10	Feb 1, 1924	21 years, 335 days	Mechanics Building, Boston, Massachusetts, U.S.	
143	Win	64–13–48 (18)	Harry Galfund	PTS	12	Dec 10, 1923	21 years, 282 days	Broadway Arena, New York City, New York, U.S.	
142	Win	63–13–48 (18)	Bermondsey Billy Wells	PTS	15	Oct 26, 1923	21 years, 237 days	Madison Square Garden, New York City, New York, U.S.	
141	Win	62–13–48 (18)	Joe O'Hara	NWS	10	Sep 28, 1923	21 years, 209 days	Mullen-Sager Arena, Aurora, Illinois, U.S.	
140	Win	62–13–48 (17)	Dago Joe Gans	NWS	10	Sep 21, 1923	21 years, 202 days	Auditorium, Saint Paul, Minnesota, U.S.	
139	Win	62–13–48 (16)	Johnny Herman	TKO	2 (12)	Sep 3, 1923	21 years, 184 days	Providence, Rhode Island, U.S.	
138	Win	61–13–48 (16)	Jimmy Kelly	NWS	10	Aug 29, 1923	21 years, 179 days	South Main Street Armory, Wilkes-Barre, Pennsylvania, U.S.	
137	Win	61–13–48 (15)	Georgie Ward	UD	15	Aug 24, 1923	21 years, 174 days	Johnson Field, Johnson City, New York, U.S.	
136	Win	60–13–48 (15)	Paul Doyle	PTS	10	Aug 1, 1923	21 years, 151 days	Velodrome, New York City, New York, U.S.	
135	Loss	59–13–48 (15)	Jimmy Jones	PTS	10	Jul 27, 1923	21 years, 146 days	Arena, Boston, Massachusetts, U.S.	Lost NYSAC welterweight title
134	Win	59–12–48 (15)	Jimmy Kelly	PTS	12	Jun 22, 1923	21 years, 111 days	Steeplechase A.A., New York City, New York, U.S.	
133	Win	58–12–48 (15)	Georgie Ward	PTS	10	Feb 27, 1923	20 years, 361 days	Mechanics Building, Boston, Massachusetts, U.S.	
132	Win	57–12–48 (15)	Morrie Schlaifer	NWS	10	Feb 9, 1923	20 years, 343 days	Armory Arena, Duluth, Minnesota, U.S.	
131	Win	57–12–48 (14)	Eddie Shevlin	PTS	10	Feb 3, 1923	20 years, 337 days	Mechanics Building, Boston, Massachusetts, U.S.	
130	Win	56–12–48 (14)	Jimmy Kelly	PTS	12	Jan 13, 1923	20 years, 316 days	Commonwealth Sporting Club, New York City, New York, U.S.	
129	Win	55–12–48 (14)	Jimmy Jones	NWS	10	Jan 8, 1923	20 years, 311 days	Motor Square Garden, Pittsburgh, Pennsylvania, U.S.	
128	Win	55–12–48 (13)	Frankie Schoell	PTS	10	Dec 15, 1922	20 years, 287 days	City Auditorium, Omaha, Nebraska, U.S.	
127	Win	54–12–48 (13)	Jack Perry	TKO	7 (10)	Nov 6, 1922	20 years, 248 days	Arena, Boston, Massachusetts, U.S.	
126	Loss	53–12–48 (13)	Eddie Shevlin	PTS	10	Oct 9, 1922	20 years, 220 days	Arena, Boston, Massachusetts, U.S.	
125	Win	53–11–48 (13)	Cowboy Padgett	NWS	12	Oct 3, 1922	20 years, 214 days	City Auditorium, Galveston, Texas, U.S.	
124	Win	53–11–48 (12)	Jack Perry	NWS	10	Sep 8, 1922	20 years, 189 days	Auditorium, Milwaukee, Wisconsin, U.S.	
123	Win	53–11–48 (11)	Georgie Ward	NWS	12	Jul 31, 1922	20 years, 150 days	Broad A.C., Newark, New Jersey, U.S.	
122	Win	53–11–48 (10)	Tillie Herman	DQ	2 (12)	Jun 12, 1922	20 years, 101 days	Houston, Texas, U.S.	Herman DQ'd for hitting low
121	Draw	52–11–48 (10)	Billy Ryan	NWS	10	Jun 7, 1922	20 years, 96 days	Redland Field, Cincinnati, Ohio, U.S.	
120	Loss	52–11–48 (9)	Pete Latzo	NWS	10	May 17, 1922	20 years, 75 days	South Main Street Armory, Wilkes-Barre, Pennsylvania, U.S.	
119	Win	52–11–48 (8)	Paul Doyle	PTS	10	May 8, 1922	20 years, 66 days	Arena, Boston, Massachusetts, U.S.	
118	Win	51–11–48 (8)	Dennis O'Keefe	NWS	10	May 1, 1922	20 years, 59 days	Kenosha, Wisconsin, U.S.	
117	Win	51–11–48 (7)	Bud Logan	PTS	10	Apr 18, 1922	20 years, 46 days	City Auditorium, Omaha, Nebraska, U.S.	
116	Win	50–11–48 (7)	Nate Siegel	PTS	10	Apr 3, 1922	20 years, 31 days	Arena, Boston, Massachusetts, U.S.	
115	Win	49–11–48 (7)	Pinky Mitchell	KO	4 (10)	Mar 27, 1922	20 years, 24 days	Auditorium, Milwaukee, Wisconsin, U.S.	
114	Win	48–11–48 (7)	Jimmy Jones	NWS	12	Mar 17, 1922	20 years, 14 days	Canton Auditorium, Canton, Ohio, U.S.	
113	Win	48–11–48 (6)	Johnny Riley	NWS	10	Mar 15, 1922	20 years, 12 days	South Main Street Armory, Wilkes-Barre, Pennsylvania, U.S.	
112	Loss	48–11–48 (5)	Frankie Schoell	PTS	10	Mar 13, 1922	20 years, 10 days	Broadway Auditorium, Buffalo, New York, U.S.	
111	Win	48–10–48 (5)	Morrie Schlaifer	PTS	10	Mar 9, 1922	20 years, 6 days	City Auditorium, Omaha, Nebraska, U.S.	
110	Win	47–10–48 (5)	Billy Ryan	NWS	10	Feb 27, 1922	19 years, 361 days	Heuck's Opera House, Cincinnati, Ohio, U.S.	
109	Draw	47–10–48 (4)	Jack Britton	MD	15	Feb 17, 1922	19 years, 351 days	Madison Square Garden, New York City, New York, U.S.	For NYSAC and NBA welterweight titles
108	Win	47–10–47 (4)	Jack Perry	PTS	10	Dec 26, 1921	19 years, 298 days	Broadway Auditorium, Buffalo, New Jersey, U.S.	
107	Win	46–10–47 (4)	Mickey Walker	NWS	12	Dec 21, 1921	19 years, 293 days	Broad A.C., Newark, New Jersey, U.S.	
106	Draw	46–10–47 (3)	Al Norton	PTS	12	Dec 15, 1921	19 years, 287 days	Columbus Hall, Yonkers, New York, U.S.	
105	Loss	46–10–46 (3)	Mickey Walker	TKO	8 (12)	Nov 21, 1921	19 years, 263 days	Broad A.C., Newark, New Jersey, U.S.	
104	Win	46–9–46 (3)	Jimmy Kelly	PTS	12	Nov 5, 1921	19 years, 247 days	Commonwealth S.C., New York City, New York, U.S.	
103	Win	45–9–46 (3)	Joe Jackson	NWS	8	Oct 29, 1921	19 years, 240 days	National A.C., Philadelphia, Pennsylvania, U.S.	
102	Win	45–9–46 (2)	Georgie Levine	TKO	14 (15)	Oct 22, 1921	19 years, 233 days	Clermont Avenue Rink, New York City, New York, U.S.	
101	Win	44–9–46 (2)	Georgie Ward	PTS	10	Oct 7, 1921	19 years, 218 days	Madison Square Garden, New York City, New York, U.S.	
100	Draw	43–9–46 (2)	Frankie Murphy	PTS	10	Aug 19, 1921	19 years, 169 days	Armory, Marshfield, Oregon, U.S.	
99	Draw	43–9–45 (2)	Joe Simonich	PTS	4	Aug 9, 1921	19 years, 159 days	Pavilion, Seattle, Washington, U.S.	
98	Win	43–9–44 (2)	Joe Simonich	PTS	15	Jul 4, 1921	19 years, 123 days	Broadway Theater, Butte, Montana, U.S.	
97	Win	42–9–44 (2)	Claire Bromeo	TKO	9 (10)	Jun 24, 1921	19 years, 113 days	Armory, Portland, Oregon, U.S.	
96	Draw	41–9–44 (2)	Jack Britton	PTS	10	Jun 3, 1921	19 years, 92 days	Arena, Milwaukie, Oregon, U.S.	For NYSAC and NBA welterweight titles
95	Draw	41–9–43 (2)	Travie Davis	PTS	6	Apr 21, 1921	19 years, 49 days	Eagles Hall, Tacoma, Washington, U.S.	
94	Win	41–9–42 (2)	Harry Schuman	PTS	10	Apr 15, 1921	19 years, 43 days	Armory, Portland, Oregon, U.S.	
93	Win	40–9–42 (2)	Frankie Haynie	KO	4 (6)	Apr 7, 1921	19 years, 35 days	Eagles A.C., Tacoma, Washington, U.S.	
92	Win	39–9–42 (2)	Frankie Murphy	PTS	10	Mar 30, 1921	19 years, 27 days	Arena, Milwaukie, Oregon, U.S.	
91	Win	38–9–42 (2)	Frankie Murphy	PTS	10	Mar 17, 1921	19 years, 14 days	Arena, Milwaukie, Oregon, U.S.	
90	Win	37–9–42 (2)	Jimmy Storey	KO	2 (6)	Mar 10, 1921	19 years, 7 days	Eagles Hall, Tacoma, Washington, U.S.	
89	Draw	36–9–42 (2)	Earl France	PTS	4	Mar 4, 1921	19 years, 1 day	Dreamland Pavilion, Seattle, Washington, U.S.	
88	Draw	36–9–41 (2)	Oakland Frankie Burns	PTS	4	Dec 8, 1920	18 years, 280 days	Auditorium, Oakland, California, U.S.	
87	Win	36–9–40 (2)	Willie Cappelli	PTS	4	Dec 1, 1920	18 years, 273 days	Auditorium, Oakland, California, U.S.	
86	Win	35–9–40 (2)	Willie Cappelli	PTS	4	Nov 17, 1920	18 years, 259 days	Auditorium, Oakland, California, U.S.	
85	Draw	34–9–40 (2)	Frankie Farren	PTS	4	Oct 29, 1920	18 years, 240 days	Dreamland Rink, San Francisco, California, U.S.	
84	Draw	34–9–39 (2)	Joe Miller	PTS	4	Oct 22, 1920	18 years, 233 days	Dreamland Rink, San Francisco, California, U.S.	
83	Loss	34–9–38 (2)	Oakland Jimmy Duffy	PTS	4	Oct 13, 1920	18 years, 224 days	Auditorium, Oakland, California, U.S.	
82	Draw	34–8–38 (2)	Oakland Jimmy Duffy	PTS	4	Oct 6, 1920	18 years, 217 days	Auditorium, Oakland, California, U.S.	
81	Draw	34–8–37 (2)	Oakland Frankie Burns	PTS	4	Sep 22, 1920	18 years, 203 days	Auditorium, Oakland, California, U.S.	
80	Win	34–8–36 (2)	Frankie Farren	PTS	4	Sep 10, 1920	18 years, 191 days	Dreamland Rink, San Francisco, California, U.S.	
79	Draw	33–8–36 (2)	Joe Miller	PTS	4	Sep 3, 1920	18 years, 184 days	Dreamland Rink, San Francisco, California, U.S.	
78	Draw	33–8–35 (2)	Frankie Farren	PTS	4	Aug 27, 1920	18 years, 177 days	Dreamland Rink, San Francisco, California, U.S.	
77	Win	33–8–34 (2)	Battling Bill Hurley	PTS	4	Aug 24, 1920	18 years, 174 days	Town Hall, Benicia, California, U.S.	
76	Win	32–8–34 (2)	Charlie McCarthy	PTS	4	Aug 6, 1920	18 years, 156 days	Dreamland Rink, San Francisco, California, U.S.	
75	Win	31–8–34 (2)	Eddie Hawke	PTS	4	Jul 29, 1920	18 years, 148 days	Benicia, California, U.S.	
74	Win	30–8–34 (2)	Johnny Weber	PTS	4	Jul 23, 1920	18 years, 142 days	Dreamland Rink, San Francisco, California, U.S.	
73	Draw	29–8–34 (2)	Willie Hunefeld	PTS	4	Jul 16, 1920	18 years, 135 days	Dreamland Rink, San Francisco, California, U.S.	
72	Win	29–8–33 (2)	Johnny Papke	PTS	4	Jun 18, 1920	18 years, 107 days	Sacramento, California, U.S.	
71	Draw	28–8–33 (2)	Evert Hammer	PTS	4	Jun 9, 1920	18 years, 98 days	American Legion, Stockton, California, U.S.	
70	Win	28–8–32 (2)	Gene Cline	PTS	4	May 25, 1920	18 years, 83 days	Stockton, California, U.S.	
69	Loss	27–8–32 (2)	Phil Salvadore	PTS	4	May 14, 1920	18 years, 72 days	Armory, Sacramento, California, U.S.	
68	Draw	27–7–32 (2)	Danny Kramer	PTS	4	Apr 12, 1920	18 years, 40 days	Midway Arena, Taft, California, U.S.	
67	NC	27–7–31 (2)	Larry Jones	NC	3 (4)	Apr 9, 1920	18 years, 37 days	Dreamland Rink, San Francisco, California, U.S.	Fight stopped for "stalling"
66	Win	27–7–31 (1)	George Eagel	PTS	4	Mar 26, 1920	18 years, 23 days	Dreamland Rink, San Francisco, California, U.S.	
65	Win	26–7–31 (1)	Joe Gorman	PTS	4	Mar 12, 1920	18 years, 9 days	Dreamland Rink, San Francisco, California, U.S.	
64	Draw	25–7–31 (1)	Billy Alvarez	PTS	4	Mar 11, 1920	18 years, 8 days	Taft, California, U.S.	
63	Draw	25–7–30 (1)	Johnny Papke	PTS	4	Mar 2, 1920	17 years, 365 days	Bakersfield, California, U.S.	
62	Win	25–7–29 (1)	Lee Johnson	PTS	4	Feb 18, 1920	17 years, 352 days	Auditorium, Oakland, California, U.S.	
61	Win	24–7–29 (1)	Earl Young	PTS	6	Jan 12, 1920	17 years, 315 days	Oregon Building at Presidio, San Francisco, California, U.S.	
60	Draw	23–7–29 (1)	Young Johnny Golindo	PTS	4	Jan 6, 1920	17 years, 309 days	Bakersfield Stadium, Bakersfield, California, U.S.	
59	Loss	23–7–28 (1)	Frankie Malone	PTS	4	Jan 1, 1920	17 years, 304 days	Coliseum, San Francisco, California, U.S.	
58	Win	23–6–28 (1)	California Dixie Kid	PTS	4	Dec 23, 1919	17 years, 295 days	Bakersfield Stadium, Bakersfield, California, U.S.	
57	Win	22–6–28 (1)	Johnny Kid Mex	PTS	4	Dec 2, 1919	17 years, 274 days	Arena, Vernon, California, U.S.	
56	Win	21–6–28 (1)	Henry Gastine	PTS	4	Nov 28, 1919	17 years, 270 days	Arena, Vernon, California, U.S.	
55	Win	20–6–28 (1)	Joe Brown	PTS	4	Nov 14, 1919	17 years, 256 days	Arena, Vernon, California, U.S.	
54	Draw	19–6–28 (1)	Joe Brown	PTS	4	Nov 13, 1919	17 years, 255 days	Arena, Vernon, California, U.S.	
53	Loss	19–6–27 (1)	Danny Kramer	PTS	4	Oct 31, 1919	17 years, 242 days	Arena, Vernon, California, U.S.	
52	Draw	19–5–27 (1)	George Spencer	PTS	4	Oct 2, 1919	17 years, 213 days	Coliseum, San Francisco, California, U.S.	
51	Draw	19–5–26 (1)	Danny Kramer	PTS	4	Sep 26, 1919	17 years, 207 days	Long Beach, California, U.S.	
50	Draw	19–5–25 (1)	Joe Coffey	PTS	4	Sep 12, 1919	17 years, 193 days	Dreamland Rink, San Francisco, California, U.S.	
49	Win	19–5–24 (1)	Joe Coffey	PTS	4	Sep 9, 1919	17 years, 190 days	Modesto, California, U.S.	
48	Draw	18–5–24 (1)	Joe Brown	PTS	4	Sep 4, 1919	17 years, 185 days	Rodeo Arena, San Francisco, California, U.S.	
47	Win	18–5–23 (1)	Eddie Gorman	PTS	4	Sep 1, 1919	17 years, 182 days	Rodeo Arena, San Francisco, California, U.S.	
46	Draw	17–5–23 (1)	Joe Brown	PTS	4	Aug 29, 1919	17 years, 179 days	Dreamland Rink, San Francisco, California, U.S.	
45	Draw	17–5–22 (1)	Frankie Vierra	PTS	4	Aug 20, 1919	17 years, 170 days	Auditorium, Oakland, California, U.S.	
44	Win	17–5–21 (1)	Johnny Conde	PTS	4	Aug 15, 1919	17 years, 165 days	Dreamland Rink, San Francisco, California, U.S.	
43	Draw	16–5–21 (1)	Charlie Moy	PTS	4	Aug 5, 1919	17 years, 155 days	Martinez, California, U.S.	
42	Win	16–5–20 (1)	George Hall	PTS	4	Jul 18, 1919	17 years, 137 days	Floral A.C., San Mateo, California, U.S.	
41	Loss	15–5–20 (1)	Charlie Moy	PTS	4	Jul 11, 1919	17 years, 130 days	Dreamland Rink, San Francisco, California, U.S.	
40	Draw	15–4–20 (1)	Willie Penn	PTS	4	Jun 25, 1919	17 years, 114 days	Airdrome Theater, Vallejo, California, U.S.	
39	Draw	15–4–19 (1)	Charlie Moy	PTS	4	Jun 6, 1919	17 years, 95 days	Coliseum, San Francisco, California, U.S.	
38	Win	15–4–18 (1)	Johnny Conde	PTS	4	May 27, 1919	17 years, 85 days	Dreamland Rink, San Francisco, California, U.S.	
37	Draw	14–4–18 (1)	Larry Jones	PTS	4	May 23, 1919	17 years, 81 days	Dreamland Rink, San Francisco, California, U.S.	
36	Draw	14–4–17 (1)	Danny Edwards	PTS	4	May 7, 1919	17 years, 65 days	Auditorium, Oakland, California, U.S.	
35	Win	14–4–16 (1)	Charley Jones	KO	3 (4)	Apr 25, 1919	17 years, 53 days	Dreamland Rink, San Francisco, California, U.S.	
34	Loss	13–4–16 (1)	Joe Coffey	KO	3 (4)	Apr 4, 1919	17 years, 32 days	Dreamland Rink, San Francisco, California, U.S.	
33	Draw	13–3–16 (1)	George Spencer	PTS	4	Mar 12, 1919	17 years, 9 days	Association Club, San Francisco, California, U.S.	
32	Draw	13–3–15 (1)	Baby Blue	PTS	4	Mar 5, 1919	17 years, 2 days	Association Club, San Francisco, California, U.S.	
31	Loss	13–3–14 (1)	Danny Nunes	PTS	4	Feb 26, 1919	16 years, 360 days	Armory, Woodland, California, U.S.	
30	Win	13–2–14 (1)	Smiley Bricker	PTS	4	Jan 22, 1919	16 years, 325 days	Association Club, San Francisco, California, U.S.	
29	Win	12–2–14 (1)	Charlie Moy	PTS	4	Jan 17, 1919	16 years, 320 days	Dreamland Rink, San Francisco, California, U.S.	
28	Win	11–2–14 (1)	Baby Blue	PTS	4	Jan 15, 1919	16 years, 318 days	Association Club, San Francisco, California, U.S.	
27	Draw	10–2–14 (1)	Al Walker	PTS	4	Sep 18, 1918	16 years, 199 days	Association Club, San Francisco, California, U.S.	
26	Draw	10–2–13 (1)	Joe Coffey	PTS	4	Sep 6, 1918	16 years, 187 days	Dreamland Rink, San Francisco, California, U.S.	
25	Loss	10–2–12 (1)	Eddie Landon	PTS	4	Aug 9, 1918	16 years, 159 days	Dreamland Rink, San Francisco, California, U.S.	
24	Draw	10–1–12 (1)	Charley Jones	PTS	4	Aug 7, 1918	16 years, 157 days	Association Club, San Francisco, California, U.S.	
23	Draw	10–1–11 (1)	Joe Coffey	PTS	4	Jul 26, 1918	16 years, 145 days	Dreamland Rink, San Francisco, California, U.S.	
22	Win	10–1–10 (1)	Tiger Jack Burns	KO	2 (4)	Jul 24, 1918	16 years, 143 days	Association Club, San Francisco, California, U.S.	
21	Draw	9–1–10 (1)	Joe Coffey	PTS	4	Jul 9, 1918	16 years, 128 days	Shipbuilder's Club, Oakland, California, U.S.	
20	Draw	9–1–9 (1)	Joe Coffey	PTS	4	Jul 5, 1918	16 years, 124 days	Dreamland Rink, San Francisco, California, U.S.	
19	Draw	9–1–8 (1)	Young Joe Thomas	PTS	4	Jul 4, 1918	16 years, 123 days	Luna Park, San Jose, California, U.S.	
18	Draw	9–1–7 (1)	Young Joe Thomas	PTS	4	Jun 26, 1918	16 years, 115 days	Association Club, San Francisco, California, U.S.	
17	Draw	9–1–6 (1)	George Ingle	PTS	4	Jun 25, 1918	16 years, 114 days	Shipbuilder's Club, Oakland, California, U.S.	
16	Draw	9–1–5 (1)	Jim Coffey	PTS	4	Jun 21, 1918	16 years, 110 days	Dreamland Rink, San Francisco, California, U.S.	
15	Win	9–1–4 (1)	George Eagel	PTS	4	Jun 19, 1918	16 years, 108 days	Association Club, San Francisco, California, U.S.	
14	Win	8–1–4 (1)	Danny Reese	PTS	4	Jun 14, 1918	16 years, 103 days	Dreamland Rink, San Francisco, California, U.S.	
13	Win	7–1–4 (1)	Young Joe Thomas	PTS	4	Jun 12, 1918	16 years, 101 days	Association Club, San Francisco, California, U.S.	
12	Win	6–1–4 (1)	Jimmy Wolgast	KO	1 (4)	Jun 11, 1918	16 years, 100 days	Shipbuilder's Club, Oakland, California, U.S.	
11	Draw	5–1–4 (1)	Cash Travers	PTS	4	May 18, 1918	16 years, 76 days	Woodland, California, U.S.	
10	Draw	5–1–3 (1)	Frankie Vierra	PTS	4	May 17, 1918	16 years, 75 days	Sacramento, California, U.S.	
9	Win	5–1–2 (1)	Young Driscoll	PTS	4	Apr 26, 1918	16 years, 54 days	Dreamland Rink, San Francisco, California, U.S.	
8	Win	4–1–2 (1)	Red Bresnan	PTS	4	Apr 19, 1918	16 years, 47 days	Dreamland Rink, San Francisco, California, U.S.	
7	Draw	3–1–2 (1)	Jimmy Wolgast	PTS	4	Apr 16, 1918	16 years, 44 days	Shipbuilder's Club, Oakland, California, U.S.	
6	Win	3–1–1 (1)	Teddy O'Hara	PTS	4	Apr 10, 1918	16 years, 38 days	Oaks Ballpark, Emeryville, California, U.S.	
5	Draw	2–1–1 (1)	Al Walker	PTS	4	Apr 5, 1918	16 years, 33 days	Dreamland Rink, San Francisco, California, U.S.	
4	Win	2–1 (1)	Gene Kelly	TKO	3 (4)	Apr 3, 1918	16 years, 31 days	Association Club, San Francisco, California, U.S.	
3	NC	1–1 (1)	Al Hall	NC	1 (4)	Apr 3, 1918	16 years, 31 days	Association Club, San Francisco, California, U.S.	Bout stopped "because neither fighter was trying "
2	Loss	1–1	Tommy Driscoll	PTS	4	Mar 27, 1918	16 years, 24 days	Association Club, San Francisco, California, U.S.	
1	Win	1–0	Johnny Garcia	PTS	4	Mar 20, 1918	16 years, 17 days	Association Club, San Francisco, California, U.S.	

=== Unofficial record ===
251 fights	156 wins	29 losses
By knockout	17	2
By decision	137	26
By disqualification	2	1
Draws	62	
No contests	4	

Record with the inclusion of newspaper decisions in the win/loss/draw column.

No.	Result	Record	Opponent	Type	Round(s)	Date	Age	Location	Note
251	Win	156–29–62 (4)	Paulie Sykes	UD	10	Dec 2, 1935	33 years, 274 days	Auditorium, Pittsfield, Massachusetts, U.S.	
250	Loss	155–29–62 (4)	Johnny Rossi	UD	10	Mar 18, 1935	33 years, 15 days	Auditorium, Pittsfield, Massachusetts, U.S.	
249	Loss	155–28–62 (4)	Al Gainer	UD	10	Jan 21, 1935	32 years, 324 days	Auditorium, Pittsfield, Massachusetts, U.S.	
248	Win	155–27–62 (4)	Bob Turner	SD	10	Jan 21, 1935	32 years, 324 days	Auditorium, Pittsfield, Massachusetts, U.S.	
247	Win	154–27–62 (4)	Joe Kaminski	UD	10	Nov 26, 1934	32 years, 268 days	Auditorium, Pittsfield, Massachusetts, U.S.	
246	Draw	153–27–62 (4)	Al Rossi	MD	10	Oct 15, 1934	32 years, 226 days	Auditorium, Pittsfield, Massachusetts, U.S.	
245	Loss	153–27–61 (4)	Fred Henneberry	PTS	15	Jan 29, 1934	31 years, 332 days	Sydney Stadium, Sydney, New South Wales, Australia	
244	Win	153–26–61 (4)	Ambrose Palmer	DQ	6 (15)	Jan 15, 1934	31 years, 318 days	Sydney Stadium, Sydney, New South Wales, Australia	Low blow
243	Win	152–26–61 (4)	Fred Henneberry	PTS	15	Dec 26, 1933	31 years, 298 days	Sydney Stadium, Sydney, New South Wales, Australia	
242	Loss	151–26–61 (4)	Ambrose Palmer	PTS	15	Nov 27, 1933	31 years, 269 days	Sydney Stadium, Sydney, New South Wales, Australia	
241	Draw	151–25–61 (4)	Henry Firpo	PTS	10	Oct 29, 1933	31 years, 240 days	Houston, Texas, U.S.	
240	Win	151–25–60 (4)	Jack Gibbs	PTS	10	Oct 12, 1933	31 years, 223 days	City Auditorium, Houston, Texas, U.S.	
239	Draw	150–25–60 (4)	Rosy Baker	PTS	10	Jun 30, 1933	31 years, 119 days	Red Bird Stadium, Columbus, Ohio, U.S.	
238	Win	150–25–59 (4)	Henry Firpo	NWS	10	May 5, 1933	31 years, 63 days	Jefferson County Armory, Louisville, Kentucky, U.S.	
237	Win	149–25–59 (4)	Sammy Slaughter	PTS	10	Nov 11, 1932	30 years, 253 days	Chicago Stadium, Chicago, Illinois, U.S.	
236	Win	148–25–59 (4)	Norman Conrad	SD	10	Aug 23, 1932	30 years, 173 days	Fenway Park, Boston, Massachusetts, U.S.	
235	Win	147–25–59 (4)	Charley Horn	PTS	6	Jul 22, 1932	30 years, 141 days	Long Beach Stadium, New York City, New York, U.S.	
234	Win	146–25–59 (4)	Ray Tramblie	PTS	10	May 3, 1932	30 years, 61 days	Armory, Indianapolis, Indiana, U.S.	
233	Win	145–25–59 (4)	Jack Kilbourne	PTS	10	Apr 21, 1932	30 years, 49 days	White City Arena, Chicago, Illinois, U.S.	
232	Loss	144–25–59 (4)	Sammy Slaughter	UD	10	Apr 11, 1932	30 years, 39 days	Auditorium, Milwaukee, Wisconsin, U.S.	
231	Win	144–24–59 (4)	Angel Clivilles	PTS	10	Feb 23, 1932	29 years, 357 days	Auditorium, Milwaukee, Wisconsin, U.S.	
230	Win	143–24–59 (4)	Henry Firpo	PTS	10	Feb 8, 1932	29 years, 342 days	White City Arena, Chicago, Illinois, U.S.	
229	Win	142–24–59 (4)	Joey LaGrey	PTS	10	Jan 22, 1932	29 years, 325 days	Madison Square Garden, New York City, New York, U.S.	
228	Win	141–24–59 (4)	Al Gainer	PTS	10	Nov 5, 1931	29 years, 247 days	State Armory, Waterbury, Connecticut, U.S.	
227	Win	140–24–59 (4)	Ben Jeby	UD	12	Oct 2, 1931	29 years, 213 days	Madison Square Garden, New York City, New York, U.S.	
226	Draw	139–24–59 (4)	Ben Jeby	PTS	10	Sep 8, 1931	29 years, 189 days	Queensboro Stadium, New York City, New York, U.S.	
225	Win	139–24–58 (4)	Willie Oster	PTS	10	Aug 17, 1931	29 years, 167 days	White City Arena, Chicago, Illinois, U.S.	
224	Win	138–24–58 (4)	Leo Larrivee	PTS	10	Apr 14, 1931	29 years, 42 days	Arena, Boston, Massachusetts, U.S.	Not to be confused with Leo Larrivee
223	Loss	137–24–58 (4)	Tiger Thomas	UD	10	Feb 12, 1931	28 years, 346 days	South Main Street Armory, Wilkes-Barre, Pennsylvania, U.S.	
222	Win	137–23–58 (4)	Joe Anderson	TKO	10 (10)	Jan 9, 1931	28 years, 312 days	Madison Square Garden, New York City, New York, U.S.	
221	Draw	136–23–58 (4)	Jack Hood	PTS	12	Dec 4, 1930	28 years, 276 days	Royal Albert Hall, Kensington, London, England, U.K.	
220	Draw	136–23–57 (4)	Jack Hood	PTS	12	Oct 28, 1930	28 years, 239 days	Royal Albert Hall, Kensington, London, England, U.K.	
219	Loss	136–23–56 (4)	Len Harvey	PTS	15	Sep 29, 1930	28 years, 210 days	Royal Albert Hall, Kensington, London, England, U.K.	
218	Win	136–22–56 (4)	Joe Anderson	PTS	10	Aug 5, 1930	28 years, 155 days	Braves Field, Boston, Massachusetts, U.S.	
217	Win	135–22–56 (4)	Ace Hudkins	PTS	10	May 27, 1930	28 years, 85 days	Olympic Auditorium, Los Angeles, California, U.S.	
216	NC	134–22–56 (4)	Mike Hector	NC	9 (10)	May 6, 1930	28 years, 64 days	Olympic Auditorium, Los Angeles, California, U.S.	
215	Draw	134–22–56 (3)	Joe Anderson	PTS	10	Apr 15, 1930	28 years, 43 days	Olympic Auditorium, Los Angeles, California, U.S.	
214	Win	134–22–55 (3)	Jack Kilbourne	PTS	10	Mar 28, 1930	28 years, 25 days	Coliseum, San Diego, California, U.S.	
213	Win	133–22–55 (3)	Young George Dixon	PTS	6	Feb 27, 1930	27 years, 361 days	Greenwich Coliseum, Tacoma, Washington, U.S.	
212	Win	132–22–55 (3)	Young Johnny Burns	PTS	10	Feb 19, 1930	27 years, 353 days	Auditorium, Oakland, California, U.S.	
211	Win	131–22–55 (3)	Cowboy Jack Willis	PTS	10	Feb 10, 1930	27 years, 344 days	Dreamland Auditorium, San Francisco, California, U.S.	
210	Win	130–22–55 (3)	Joe Roche	PTS	10	Jan 24, 1930	27 years, 327 days	Dreamland Auditorium, San Francisco, California, U.S.	
209	Win	129–22–55 (3)	Dick Evans	KO	2 (10)	Nov 15, 1929	27 years, 257 days	Beach Arena, Miami Beach, Florida, U.S.	
208	Win	128–22–55 (3)	Joe Roche	PTS	10	Oct 2, 1929	27 years, 213 days	Coliseum, Chicago, Illinois, U.S.	
207	Win	127–22–55 (3)	Young George Dixon	PTS	10	Aug 21, 1929	27 years, 171 days	Arcadia Pavilion, Oakland, California, U.S.	
206	Win	126–22–55 (3)	Rene De Vos	PTS	10	Jul 18, 1929	27 years, 137 days	Yankee Stadium, New York City, New York, U.S.	
205	Win	125–22–55 (3)	Leo Mitchell	PTS	8	Jul 12, 1929	27 years, 131 days	Long Beach Stadium, New York City, New York, U.S.	
204	Draw	124–22–55 (3)	Esteban Gallard	PTS	12	Apr 30, 1929	27 years, 58 days	Parque Romano, Buenos Aires, Distrito Federal, Argentina	
203	Win	124–22–54 (3)	Manuel K.O. Brissett	PTS	12	Mar 30, 1929	27 years, 27 days	Buenos Aires, Distrito Federal, Argentina	
202	Loss	123–22–54 (3)	Ray Still	DQ	7 (10)	Dec 27, 1928	26 years, 299 days	Arena, Trenton, New Jersey, U.S.	
201	Win	123–21–54 (3)	Arthur Flynn	PTS	10	Dec 7, 1928	26 years, 279 days	Boston Garden, Boston, Massachusetts, U.S.	
200	Win	122–21–54 (3)	Bobby Williams	KO	3 (10)	Nov 22, 1928	26 years, 264 days	Armory, Grand Rapids, Michigan, U.S.	
199	Loss	121–21–54 (3)	Rene De Vos	UD	10	Nov 2, 1928	26 years, 244 days	Coliseum, Chicago, Illinois, U.S.	
198	Win	121–20–54 (3)	Cowboy Jack Willis	PTS	10	Oct 15, 1928	26 years, 226 days	White City Arena, Chicago, Illinois, U.S.	
197	Win	120–20–54 (3)	Joe Anderson	PTS	10	Aug 20, 1928	26 years, 170 days	Midway Gardens, Chicago, Illinois, U.S.	
196	Loss	119–20–54 (3)	Rene De Vos	PTS	10	Aug 1, 1928	26 years, 151 days	Outdoor Arena, Philadelphia, Pennsylvania, U.S.	
195	Win	119–19–54 (3)	Tiger Johnny Cline	PTS	10	Jul 23, 1928	26 years, 142 days	Muehlebach Field, Kansas City, Missouri, U.S.	
194	Win	118–19–54 (3)	Bert Colima	KO	7 (10)	Jul 9, 1928	26 years, 128 days	Midway Gardens, Chicago, Illinois, U.S.	
193	Win	117–19–54 (3)	George Courtney	PTS	10	Jun 15, 1928	26 years, 104 days	Coney Island Stadium, New York City, New York, U.S.	
192	Win	116–19–54 (3)	Tiger Johnny Cline	NWS	10	Jun 7, 1928	26 years, 96 days	Coliseum, Davenport, Iowa, U.S.	
191	Win	115–19–54 (3)	Imey Garfinkle	NWS	10	May 29, 1928	26 years, 87 days	Muehlebach Field, Kansas City, Missouri, U.S.	
190	Win	114–19–54 (3)	Del Fontaine	PTS	10	Mar 19, 1928	26 years, 16 days	White City Arena, Chicago, Illinois, U.S.	
189	Win	113–19–54 (3)	Charley Long	PTS	10	Feb 29, 1928	25 years, 363 days	Auditorium, Oakland, California, U.S.	
188	Win	112–19–54 (3)	Al Webster	PTS	10	Feb 21, 1928	25 years, 355 days	Stockyards Stadium, Denver, Colorado, U.S.	
187	Loss	111–19–54 (3)	Joe Anderson	PTS	10	Feb 7, 1928	25 years, 341 days	Olympic Auditorium, Los Angeles, California, U.S.	
186	Draw	111–18–54 (3)	Jack McVey	PTS	12	Oct 12, 1927	25 years, 223 days	Public Hall, Cleveland, Ohio, U.S.	
185	Win	111–18–53 (3)	Al Webster	PTS	10	Sep 26, 1927	25 years, 207 days	Tulsa, Oklahoma, U.S.	
184	Win	110–18–53 (3)	Warnie Smith	PTS	10	Sep 5, 1927	25 years, 186 days	Convention Hall, Kansas City, Missouri, U.S.	
183	Win	109–18–53 (3)	Joe Anderson	PTS	10	Aug 11, 1927	25 years, 161 days	Yankee Stadium, New York City, New York, U.S.	
182	Win	108–18–53 (3)	Willie Walker	PTS	12	Aug 6, 1927	25 years, 156 days	Rocky Point Natatorium, Providence, Rhode Island, U.S.	
181	Win	107–18–53 (3)	Young George Dixon	PTS	10	Jun 21, 1927	25 years, 110 days	Armory, Portland, Oregon, U.S.	
180	Win	106–18–53 (3)	Cowboy Jack Willis	PTS	10	Jun 15, 1927	25 years, 104 days	Auditorium, Oakland, California, U.S.	
179	Win	105–18–53 (3)	Bert Colima	PTS	10	May 24, 1927	25 years, 82 days	Olympic Auditorium, Los Angeles, California, U.S.	
178	Win	104–18–53 (3)	Phil Krug	PTS	10	Apr 12, 1927	25 years, 40 days	Coliseum, Chicago, Illinois, U.S.	
177	Draw	103–18–53 (3)	Lou Scozza	PTS	10	Apr 1, 1927	25 years, 29 days	Broadway Auditorium, Buffalo, New York, U.S.	
176	Win	103–18–52 (3)	Tillie Herman	TKO	7 (10)	Mar 17, 1927	25 years, 14 days	Coliseum, Chicago, Illinois, U.S.	
175	Win	102–18–52 (3)	Walcott Langford	PTS	10	Feb 24, 1927	24 years, 358 days	Coliseum, Chicago, Illinois, U.S.	
174	Win	101–18–52 (3)	Vic McLaughlin	TKO	6 (10)	Feb 12, 1927	24 years, 346 days	Walker A.C., New York City, New York, U.S.	
173	Win	100–18–52 (3)	Johnny Oakey	NWS	10	Jan 28, 1927	24 years, 331 days	Convention Hall, Camden, New Jersey, U.S.	
172	Win	99–18–52 (3)	Bobby Barrett	PTS	10	Jul 12, 1926	24 years, 131 days	Shibe Park, Philadelphia, Pennsylvania, U.S.	
171	Win	98–18–52 (3)	Lew Chester	NWS	12	Jul 6, 1926	24 years, 125 days	Laurel Open-Air Arena, Newark, New Jersey, U.S.	
170	Loss	97–18–52 (3)	Maxie Rosenbloom	PTS	12	Jun 29, 1926	24 years, 118 days	Queensboro Stadium, New York City, New York, U.S.	
169	Loss	97–17–52 (3)	Maxie Rosenbloom	UD	10	Jun 5, 1926	24 years, 94 days	Queensboro Stadium, New York City, New York, U.S.	
168	Win	97–16–52 (3)	Frank Moody	PTS	10	Apr 23, 1926	24 years, 51 days	Arena, Syracuse, New York, U.S.	
167	NC	96–16–52 (3)	Frank Moody	NC	5 (10)	Apr 12, 1926	24 years, 40 days	Arena, Syracuse, New York, U.S.	Stopped for "stalling"
166	Win	96–16–52 (2)	Jack Conley	PTS	10	Feb 12, 1926	23 years, 346 days	Benjamin Field Arena, Tampa, Florida, U.S.	
165	Win	95–16–52 (2)	Jock Malone	NWS	10	Jan 15, 1926	23 years, 318 days	Auditorium, Saint Paul, Minnesota, U.S.	
164	Win	94–16–52 (2)	Roland Todd	PTS	10	Jan 1, 1926	23 years, 304 days	Madison Square Garden, New York City, New York, U.S.	
163	Win	93–16–52 (2)	Bermondsey Billy Wells	NWS	10	Oct 16, 1925	23 years, 227 days	Arena Gardens, Michigan, U.S.	
162	Loss	92–16–52 (2)	Mickey Walker	SD	15	Sep 21, 1925	23 years, 202 days	Yankee Stadium, New York City, New York, U.S.	For NYSAC, NBA, The Ring welterweight titles
161	Win	92–15–52 (2)	Frankie Schoell	PTS	10	Aug 8, 1925	23 years, 158 days	Recreation Park, San Francisco, California, U.S.	
160	Win	91–15–52 (2)	Morrie Schlaifer	UD	10	Jul 22, 1925	23 years, 141 days	Artillery Park, Wilkes-Barre, Pennsylvania, U.S.	
159	Win	90–15–52 (2)	Jimmy Slattery	TKO	3 (10)	Jul 2, 1925	23 years, 121 days	Polo Grounds, New York City, New York, U.S.	
158	Win	89–15–52 (2)	Osk Till	PTS	10	Mar 23, 1925	23 years, 20 days	Convention Hall, Rochester, New York, U.S.	
157	Win	88–15–52 (2)	Phil Krug	NWS	12	Dec 3, 1924	22 years, 275 days	1st Regiment Armory, Newark, New Jersey, U.S.	
156	Draw	87–15–52 (2)	Oakland Jimmy Duffy	PTS	4	Sep 1, 1924	22 years, 182 days	Oaks Ballpark, Emeryville, California, U.S.	
155	Draw	87–15–51 (2)	Bert Colima	PTS	4	Aug 12, 1924	22 years, 162 days	Arena, Vernon, California, U.S.	
154	Win	87–15–50 (2)	Joe Simonich	PTS	4	Jul 22, 1924	22 years, 141 days	Arena, Vernon, California, U.S.	
153	Loss	86–15–50 (2)	Bert Colima	PTS	4	Jul 15, 1924	22 years, 134 days	Arena, Vernon, California, U.S.	
152	Win	86–14–50 (2)	Warnie Smith	NWS	10	Jun 16, 1924	22 years, 105 days	Open-air Arena, East Chicago, Indiana, U.S.	
151	Win	85–14–50 (2)	Morrie Schlaifer	PTS	12	May 23, 1924	22 years, 81 days	Public Hall, Cleveland, Ohio, U.S.	
150	Draw	84–14–50 (2)	Pete Latzo	UD	10	May 19, 1924	22 years, 77 days	South Main Street Armory, Wilkes-Barre, Pennsylvania, U.S.	
149	Win	84–14–49 (2)	Augie Ratner	PTS	10	May 7, 1924	22 years, 65 days	Arena, Boston, Massachusetts, U.S.	
148	Win	83–14–49 (2)	Allentown Joe Gans	PTS	10	Apr 28, 1924	22 years, 56 days	South Main Street Armory, Wilkes-Barre, Pennsylvania, U.S.	
147	Win	82–14–49 (2)	Morrie Schlaifer	PTS	10	Apr 25, 1924	22 years, 53 days	City Auditorium, Omaha, Nebraska, U.S.	
146	Win	81–14–49 (2)	Frankie Schoell	PTS	10	Apr 14, 1924	22 years, 42 days	Broadway Auditorium, Buffalo, New York, U.S.	
145	Win	80–14–49 (2)	Bermondsey Billy Wells	NWS	10	Feb 18, 1924	21 years, 352 days	Auditorium, Saint Paul, Minnesota, U.S.	
144	Win	79–14–49 (2)	Ted Moore	PTS	10	Feb 1, 1924	21 years, 335 days	Mechanics Building, Boston, Massachusetts, U.S.	
143	Win	78–14–49 (2)	Harry Galfund	PTS	12	Dec 10, 1923	21 years, 282 days	Broadway Arena, New York City, New York, U.S.	
142	Win	77–14–49 (2)	Bermondsey Billy Wells	PTS	15	Oct 26, 1923	21 years, 237 days	Madison Square Garden, New York City, New York, U.S.	
141	Win	76–14–49 (2)	Joe O'Hara	NWS	10	Sep 28, 1923	21 years, 209 days	Mullen-Sager Arena, Aurora, Illinois, U.S.	
140	Win	75–14–49 (2)	Dago Joe Gans	NWS	10	Sep 21, 1923	21 years, 202 days	Auditorium, Saint Paul, Minnesota, U.S.	
139	Win	74–14–49 (2)	Johnny Herman	TKO	2 (12)	Sep 3, 1923	21 years, 184 days	Providence, Rhode Island, U.S.	
138	Win	73–14–49 (2)	Jimmy Kelly	NWS	10	Aug 29, 1923	21 years, 179 days	South Main Street Armory, Wilkes-Barre, Pennsylvania, U.S.	
137	Win	72–14–49 (2)	Georgie Ward	UD	15	Aug 24, 1923	21 years, 174 days	Johnson Field, Johnson City, New York, U.S.	
136	Win	71–14–49 (2)	Paul Doyle	PTS	10	Aug 1, 1923	21 years, 151 days	Velodrome, New York City, New York, U.S.	
135	Loss	70–14–49 (2)	Jimmy Jones	PTS	10	Jul 27, 1923	21 years, 146 days	Arena, Boston, Massachusetts, U.S.	Lost NYSAC welterweight title
134	Win	70–13–49 (2)	Jimmy Kelly	PTS	12	Jun 22, 1923	21 years, 111 days	Steeplechase A.A., New York City, New York, U.S.	
133	Win	69–13–49 (2)	Georgie Ward	PTS	10	Feb 27, 1923	20 years, 361 days	Mechanics Building, Boston, Massachusetts, U.S.	
132	Win	68–13–49 (2)	Morrie Schlaifer	NWS	10	Feb 9, 1923	20 years, 343 days	Armory Arena, Duluth, Minnesota, U.S.	
131	Win	67–13–49 (2)	Eddie Shevlin	PTS	10	Feb 3, 1923	20 years, 337 days	Mechanics Building, Boston, Massachusetts, U.S.	
130	Win	66–13–49 (2)	Jimmy Kelly	PTS	12	Jan 13, 1923	20 years, 316 days	Commonwealth Sporting Club, New York City, New York, U.S.	
129	Win	65–13–49 (2)	Jimmy Jones	NWS	10	Jan 8, 1923	20 years, 311 days	Motor Square Garden, Pittsburgh, Pennsylvania, U.S.	
128	Win	64–13–49 (2)	Frankie Schoell	PTS	10	Dec 15, 1922	20 years, 287 days	City Auditorium, Omaha, Nebraska, U.S.	
127	Win	63–13–49 (2)	Jack Perry	TKO	7 (10)	Nov 6, 1922	20 years, 248 days	Arena, Boston, Massachusetts, U.S.	
126	Loss	62–13–49 (2)	Eddie Shevlin	PTS	10	Oct 9, 1922	20 years, 220 days	Arena, Boston, Massachusetts, U.S.	
125	Win	62–12–49 (2)	Cowboy Padgett	NWS	12	Oct 3, 1922	20 years, 214 days	City Auditorium, Galveston, Texas, U.S.	
124	Win	61–12–49 (2)	Jack Perry	NWS	10	Sep 8, 1922	20 years, 189 days	Auditorium, Milwaukee, Wisconsin, U.S.	
123	Win	60–12–49 (2)	Georgie Ward	NWS	12	Jul 31, 1922	20 years, 150 days	Broad A.C., Newark, New Jersey, U.S.	
122	Win	59–12–49 (2)	Tillie Herman	DQ	2 (12)	Jun 12, 1922	20 years, 101 days	Houston, Texas, U.S.	Herman DQ'd for hitting low
121	Draw	58–12–49 (2)	Billy Ryan	NWS	10	Jun 7, 1922	20 years, 96 days	Redland Field, Cincinnati, Ohio, U.S.	
120	Loss	58–12–48 (2)	Pete Latzo	NWS	10	May 17, 1922	20 years, 75 days	South Main Street Armory, Wilkes-Barre, Pennsylvania, U.S.	
119	Win	58–11–48 (2)	Paul Doyle	PTS	10	May 8, 1922	20 years, 66 days	Arena, Boston, Massachusetts, U.S.	
118	Win	57–11–48 (2)	Dennis O'Keefe	NWS	10	May 1, 1922	20 years, 59 days	Kenosha, Wisconsin, U.S.	
117	Win	56–11–48 (2)	Bud Logan	PTS	10	Apr 18, 1922	20 years, 46 days	City Auditorium, Omaha, Nebraska, U.S.	
116	Win	55–11–48 (2)	Nate Siegel	PTS	10	Apr 3, 1922	20 years, 31 days	Arena, Boston, Massachusetts, U.S.	
115	Win	54–11–48 (2)	Pinky Mitchell	KO	4 (10)	Mar 27, 1922	20 years, 24 days	Auditorium, Milwaukee, Wisconsin, U.S.	
114	Win	53–11–48 (2)	Jimmy Jones	NWS	12	Mar 17, 1922	20 years, 14 days	Canton Auditorium, Canton, Ohio, U.S.	
113	Win	52–11–48 (2)	Johnny Riley	NWS	10	Mar 15, 1922	20 years, 12 days	South Main Street Armory, Wilkes-Barre, Pennsylvania, U.S.	
112	Loss	51–11–48 (2)	Frankie Schoell	PTS	10	Mar 13, 1922	20 years, 10 days	Broadway Auditorium, Buffalo, New York, U.S.	
111	Win	51–10–48 (2)	Morrie Schlaifer	PTS	10	Mar 9, 1922	20 years, 6 days	City Auditorium, Omaha, Nebraska, U.S.	
110	Win	50–10–48 (2)	Billy Ryan	NWS	10	Feb 27, 1922	19 years, 361 days	Heuck's Opera House, Cincinnati, Ohio, U.S.	
109	Draw	49–10–48 (2)	Jack Britton	MD	15	Feb 17, 1922	19 years, 351 days	Madison Square Garden, New York City, New York, U.S.	For NYSAC and NBA welterweight titles
108	Win	49–10–47 (2)	Jack Perry	PTS	10	Dec 26, 1921	19 years, 298 days	Broadway Auditorium, Buffalo, New Jersey, U.S.	
107	Win	48–10–47 (2)	Mickey Walker	NWS	12	Dec 21, 1921	19 years, 293 days	Broad A.C., Newark, New Jersey, U.S.	
106	Draw	47–10–47 (2)	Al Norton	PTS	12	Dec 15, 1921	19 years, 287 days	Columbus Hall, Yonkers, New York, U.S.	
105	Loss	47–10–46 (2)	Mickey Walker	TKO	8 (12)	Nov 21, 1921	19 years, 263 days	Broad A.C., Newark, New Jersey, U.S.	
104	Win	47–9–46 (2)	Jimmy Kelly	PTS	12	Nov 5, 1921	19 years, 247 days	Commonwealth S.C., New York City, New York, U.S.	
103	Win	46–9–46 (2)	Joe Jackson	NWS	8	Oct 29, 1921	19 years, 240 days	National A.C., Philadelphia, Pennsylvania, U.S.	
102	Win	45–9–46 (2)	Georgie Levine	TKO	14 (15)	Oct 22, 1921	19 years, 233 days	Clermont Avenue Rink, New York City, New York, U.S.	
101	Win	44–9–46 (2)	Georgie Ward	PTS	10	Oct 7, 1921	19 years, 218 days	Madison Square Garden, New York City, New York, U.S.	
100	Draw	43–9–46 (2)	Frankie Murphy	PTS	10	Aug 19, 1921	19 years, 169 days	Armory, Marshfield, Oregon, U.S.	
99	Draw	43–9–45 (2)	Joe Simonich	PTS	4	Aug 9, 1921	19 years, 159 days	Pavilion, Seattle, Washington, U.S.	
98	Win	43–9–44 (2)	Joe Simonich	PTS	15	Jul 4, 1921	19 years, 123 days	Broadway Theater, Butte, Montana, U.S.	
97	Win	42–9–44 (2)	Claire Bromeo	TKO	9 (10)	Jun 24, 1921	19 years, 113 days	Armory, Portland, Oregon, U.S.	
96	Draw	41–9–44 (2)	Jack Britton	PTS	10	Jun 3, 1921	19 years, 92 days	Arena, Milwaukie, Oregon, U.S.	For NYSAC and NBA welterweight titles
95	Draw	41–9–43 (2)	Travie Davis	PTS	6	Apr 21, 1921	19 years, 49 days	Eagles Hall, Tacoma, Washington, U.S.	
94	Win	41–9–42 (2)	Harry Schuman	PTS	10	Apr 15, 1921	19 years, 43 days	Armory, Portland, Oregon, U.S.	
93	Win	40–9–42 (2)	Frankie Haynie	KO	4 (6)	Apr 7, 1921	19 years, 35 days	Eagles A.C., Tacoma, Washington, U.S.	
92	Win	39–9–42 (2)	Frankie Murphy	PTS	10	Mar 30, 1921	19 years, 27 days	Arena, Milwaukie, Oregon, U.S.	
91	Win	38–9–42 (2)	Frankie Murphy	PTS	10	Mar 17, 1921	19 years, 14 days	Arena, Milwaukie, Oregon, U.S.	
90	Win	37–9–42 (2)	Jimmy Storey	KO	2 (6)	Mar 10, 1921	19 years, 7 days	Eagles Hall, Tacoma, Washington, U.S.	
89	Draw	36–9–42 (2)	Earl France	PTS	4	Mar 4, 1921	19 years, 1 day	Dreamland Pavilion, Seattle, Washington, U.S.	
88	Draw	36–9–41 (2)	Oakland Frankie Burns	PTS	4	Dec 8, 1920	18 years, 280 days	Auditorium, Oakland, California, U.S.	
87	Win	36–9–40 (2)	Willie Cappelli	PTS	4	Dec 1, 1920	18 years, 273 days	Auditorium, Oakland, California, U.S.	
86	Win	35–9–40 (2)	Willie Cappelli	PTS	4	Nov 17, 1920	18 years, 259 days	Auditorium, Oakland, California, U.S.	
85	Draw	34–9–40 (2)	Frankie Farren	PTS	4	Oct 29, 1920	18 years, 240 days	Dreamland Rink, San Francisco, California, U.S.	
84	Draw	34–9–39 (2)	Joe Miller	PTS	4	Oct 22, 1920	18 years, 233 days	Dreamland Rink, San Francisco, California, U.S.	
83	Loss	34–9–38 (2)	Oakland Jimmy Duffy	PTS	4	Oct 13, 1920	18 years, 224 days	Auditorium, Oakland, California, U.S.	
82	Draw	34–8–38 (2)	Oakland Jimmy Duffy	PTS	4	Oct 6, 1920	18 years, 217 days	Auditorium, Oakland, California, U.S.	
81	Draw	34–8–37 (2)	Oakland Frankie Burns	PTS	4	Sep 22, 1920	18 years, 203 days	Auditorium, Oakland, California, U.S.	
80	Win	34–8–36 (2)	Frankie Farren	PTS	4	Sep 10, 1920	18 years, 191 days	Dreamland Rink, San Francisco, California, U.S.	
79	Draw	33–8–36 (2)	Joe Miller	PTS	4	Sep 3, 1920	18 years, 184 days	Dreamland Rink, San Francisco, California, U.S.	
78	Draw	33–8–35 (2)	Frankie Farren	PTS	4	Aug 27, 1920	18 years, 177 days	Dreamland Rink, San Francisco, California, U.S.	
77	Win	33–8–34 (2)	Battling Bill Hurley	PTS	4	Aug 24, 1920	18 years, 174 days	Town Hall, Benicia, California, U.S.	
76	Win	32–8–34 (2)	Charlie McCarthy	PTS	4	Aug 6, 1920	18 years, 156 days	Dreamland Rink, San Francisco, California, U.S.	
75	Win	31–8–34 (2)	Eddie Hawke	PTS	4	Jul 29, 1920	18 years, 148 days	Benicia, California, U.S.	
74	Win	30–8–34 (2)	Johnny Weber	PTS	4	Jul 23, 1920	18 years, 142 days	Dreamland Rink, San Francisco, California, U.S.	
73	Draw	29–8–34 (2)	Willie Hunefeld	PTS	4	Jul 16, 1920	18 years, 135 days	Dreamland Rink, San Francisco, California, U.S.	
72	Win	29–8–33 (2)	Johnny Papke	PTS	4	Jun 18, 1920	18 years, 107 days	Sacramento, California, U.S.	
71	Draw	28–8–33 (2)	Evert Hammer	PTS	4	Jun 9, 1920	18 years, 98 days	American Legion, Stockton, California, U.S.	
70	Win	28–8–32 (2)	Gene Cline	PTS	4	May 25, 1920	18 years, 83 days	Stockton, California, U.S.	
69	Loss	27–8–32 (2)	Phil Salvadore	PTS	4	May 14, 1920	18 years, 72 days	Armory, Sacramento, California, U.S.	
68	Draw	27–7–32 (2)	Danny Kramer	PTS	4	Apr 12, 1920	18 years, 40 days	Midway Arena, Taft, California, U.S.	
67	NC	27–7–31 (2)	Larry Jones	NC	3 (4)	Apr 9, 1920	18 years, 37 days	Dreamland Rink, San Francisco, California, U.S.	Fight stopped for "stalling"
66	Win	27–7–31 (1)	George Eagel	PTS	4	Mar 26, 1920	18 years, 23 days	Dreamland Rink, San Francisco, California, U.S.	
65	Win	26–7–31 (1)	Joe Gorman	PTS	4	Mar 12, 1920	18 years, 9 days	Dreamland Rink, San Francisco, California, U.S.	
64	Draw	25–7–31 (1)	Billy Alvarez	PTS	4	Mar 11, 1920	18 years, 8 days	Taft, California, U.S.	
63	Draw	25–7–30 (1)	Johnny Papke	PTS	4	Mar 2, 1920	17 years, 365 days	Bakersfield, California, U.S.	
62	Win	25–7–29 (1)	Lee Johnson	PTS	4	Feb 18, 1920	17 years, 352 days	Auditorium, Oakland, California, U.S.	
61	Win	24–7–29 (1)	Earl Young	PTS	6	Jan 12, 1920	17 years, 315 days	Oregon Building at Presidio, San Francisco, California, U.S.	
60	Draw	23–7–29 (1)	Young Johnny Golindo	PTS	4	Jan 6, 1920	17 years, 309 days	Bakersfield Stadium, Bakersfield, California, U.S.	
59	Loss	23–7–28 (1)	Frankie Malone	PTS	4	Jan 1, 1920	17 years, 304 days	Coliseum, San Francisco, California, U.S.	
58	Win	23–6–28 (1)	California Dixie Kid	PTS	4	Dec 23, 1919	17 years, 295 days	Bakersfield Stadium, Bakersfield, California, U.S.	
57	Win	22–6–28 (1)	Johnny Kid Mex	PTS	4	Dec 2, 1919	17 years, 274 days	Arena, Vernon, California, U.S.	
56	Win	21–6–28 (1)	Henry Gastine	PTS	4	Nov 28, 1919	17 years, 270 days	Arena, Vernon, California, U.S.	
55	Win	20–6–28 (1)	Joe Brown	PTS	4	Nov 14, 1919	17 years, 256 days	Arena, Vernon, California, U.S.	
54	Draw	19–6–28 (1)	Joe Brown	PTS	4	Nov 13, 1919	17 years, 255 days	Arena, Vernon, California, U.S.	
53	Loss	19–6–27 (1)	Danny Kramer	PTS	4	Oct 31, 1919	17 years, 242 days	Arena, Vernon, California, U.S.	
52	Draw	19–5–27 (1)	George Spencer	PTS	4	Oct 2, 1919	17 years, 213 days	Coliseum, San Francisco, California, U.S.	
51	Draw	19–5–26 (1)	Danny Kramer	PTS	4	Sep 26, 1919	17 years, 207 days	Long Beach, California, U.S.	
50	Draw	19–5–25 (1)	Joe Coffey	PTS	4	Sep 12, 1919	17 years, 193 days	Dreamland Rink, San Francisco, California, U.S.	
49	Win	19–5–24 (1)	Joe Coffey	PTS	4	Sep 9, 1919	17 years, 190 days	Modesto, California, U.S.	
48	Draw	18–5–24 (1)	Joe Brown	PTS	4	Sep 4, 1919	17 years, 185 days	Rodeo Arena, San Francisco, California, U.S.	
47	Win	18–5–23 (1)	Eddie Gorman	PTS	4	Sep 1, 1919	17 years, 182 days	Rodeo Arena, San Francisco, California, U.S.	
46	Draw	17–5–23 (1)	Joe Brown	PTS	4	Aug 29, 1919	17 years, 179 days	Dreamland Rink, San Francisco, California, U.S.	
45	Draw	17–5–22 (1)	Frankie Vierra	PTS	4	Aug 20, 1919	17 years, 170 days	Auditorium, Oakland, California, U.S.	
44	Win	17–5–21 (1)	Johnny Conde	PTS	4	Aug 15, 1919	17 years, 165 days	Dreamland Rink, San Francisco, California, U.S.	
43	Draw	16–5–21 (1)	Charlie Moy	PTS	4	Aug 5, 1919	17 years, 155 days	Martinez, California, U.S.	
42	Win	16–5–20 (1)	George Hall	PTS	4	Jul 18, 1919	17 years, 137 days	Floral A.C., San Mateo, California, U.S.	
41	Loss	15–5–20 (1)	Charlie Moy	PTS	4	Jul 11, 1919	17 years, 130 days	Dreamland Rink, San Francisco, California, U.S.	
40	Draw	15–4–20 (1)	Willie Penn	PTS	4	Jun 25, 1919	17 years, 114 days	Airdrome Theater, Vallejo, California, U.S.	
39	Draw	15–4–19 (1)	Charlie Moy	PTS	4	Jun 6, 1919	17 years, 95 days	Coliseum, San Francisco, California, U.S.	
38	Win	15–4–18 (1)	Johnny Conde	PTS	4	May 27, 1919	17 years, 85 days	Dreamland Rink, San Francisco, California, U.S.	
37	Draw	14–4–18 (1)	Larry Jones	PTS	4	May 23, 1919	17 years, 81 days	Dreamland Rink, San Francisco, California, U.S.	
36	Draw	14–4–17 (1)	Danny Edwards	PTS	4	May 7, 1919	17 years, 65 days	Auditorium, Oakland, California, U.S.	
35	Win	14–4–16 (1)	Charley Jones	KO	3 (4)	Apr 25, 1919	17 years, 53 days	Dreamland Rink, San Francisco, California, U.S.	
34	Loss	13–4–16 (1)	Joe Coffey	KO	3 (4)	Apr 4, 1919	17 years, 32 days	Dreamland Rink, San Francisco, California, U.S.	
33	Draw	13–3–16 (1)	George Spencer	PTS	4	Mar 12, 1919	17 years, 9 days	Association Club, San Francisco, California, U.S.	
32	Draw	13–3–15 (1)	Baby Blue	PTS	4	Mar 5, 1919	17 years, 2 days	Association Club, San Francisco, California, U.S.	
31	Loss	13–3–14 (1)	Danny Nunes	PTS	4	Feb 26, 1919	16 years, 360 days	Armory, Woodland, California, U.S.	
30	Win	13–2–14 (1)	Smiley Bricker	PTS	4	Jan 22, 1919	16 years, 325 days	Association Club, San Francisco, California, U.S.	
29	Win	12–2–14 (1)	Charlie Moy	PTS	4	Jan 17, 1919	16 years, 320 days	Dreamland Rink, San Francisco, California, U.S.	
28	Win	11–2–14 (1)	Baby Blue	PTS	4	Jan 15, 1919	16 years, 318 days	Association Club, San Francisco, California, U.S.	
27	Draw	10–2–14 (1)	Al Walker	PTS	4	Sep 18, 1918	16 years, 199 days	Association Club, San Francisco, California, U.S.	
26	Draw	10–2–13 (1)	Joe Coffey	PTS	4	Sep 6, 1918	16 years, 187 days	Dreamland Rink, San Francisco, California, U.S.	
25	Loss	10–2–12 (1)	Eddie Landon	PTS	4	Aug 9, 1918	16 years, 159 days	Dreamland Rink, San Francisco, California, U.S.	
24	Draw	10–1–12 (1)	Charley Jones	PTS	4	Aug 7, 1918	16 years, 157 days	Association Club, San Francisco, California, U.S.	
23	Draw	10–1–11 (1)	Joe Coffey	PTS	4	Jul 26, 1918	16 years, 145 days	Dreamland Rink, San Francisco, California, U.S.	
22	Win	10–1–10 (1)	Tiger Jack Burns	KO	2 (4)	Jul 24, 1918	16 years, 143 days	Association Club, San Francisco, California, U.S.	
21	Draw	9–1–10 (1)	Joe Coffey	PTS	4	Jul 9, 1918	16 years, 128 days	Shipbuilder's Club, Oakland, California, U.S.	
20	Draw	9–1–9 (1)	Joe Coffey	PTS	4	Jul 5, 1918	16 years, 124 days	Dreamland Rink, San Francisco, California, U.S.	
19	Draw	9–1–8 (1)	Young Joe Thomas	PTS	4	Jul 4, 1918	16 years, 123 days	Luna Park, San Jose, California, U.S.	
18	Draw	9–1–7 (1)	Young Joe Thomas	PTS	4	Jun 26, 1918	16 years, 115 days	Association Club, San Francisco, California, U.S.	
17	Draw	9–1–6 (1)	George Ingle	PTS	4	Jun 25, 1918	16 years, 114 days	Shipbuilder's Club, Oakland, California, U.S.	
16	Draw	9–1–5 (1)	Jim Coffey	PTS	4	Jun 21, 1918	16 years, 110 days	Dreamland Rink, San Francisco, California, U.S.	
15	Win	9–1–4 (1)	George Eagel	PTS	4	Jun 19, 1918	16 years, 108 days	Association Club, San Francisco, California, U.S.	
14	Win	8–1–4 (1)	Danny Reese	PTS	4	Jun 14, 1918	16 years, 103 days	Dreamland Rink, San Francisco, California, U.S.	
13	Win	7–1–4 (1)	Young Joe Thomas	PTS	4	Jun 12, 1918	16 years, 101 days	Association Club, San Francisco, California, U.S.	
12	Win	6–1–4 (1)	Jimmy Wolgast	KO	1 (4)	Jun 11, 1918	16 years, 100 days	Shipbuilder's Club, Oakland, California, U.S.	
11	Draw	5–1–4 (1)	Cash Travers	PTS	4	May 18, 1918	16 years, 76 days	Woodland, California, U.S.	
10	Draw	5–1–3 (1)	Frankie Vierra	PTS	4	May 17, 1918	16 years, 75 days	Sacramento, California, U.S.	
9	Win	5–1–2 (1)	Young Driscoll	PTS	4	Apr 26, 1918	16 years, 54 days	Dreamland Rink, San Francisco, California, U.S.	
8	Win	4–1–2 (1)	Red Bresnan	PTS	4	Apr 19, 1918	16 years, 47 days	Dreamland Rink, San Francisco, California, U.S.	
7	Draw	3–1–2 (1)	Jimmy Wolgast	PTS	4	Apr 16, 1918	16 years, 44 days	Shipbuilder's Club, Oakland, California, U.S.	
6	Win	3–1–1 (1)	Teddy O'Hara	PTS	4	Apr 10, 1918	16 years, 38 days	Oaks Ballpark, Emeryville, California, U.S.	
5	Draw	2–1–1 (1)	Al Walker	PTS	4	Apr 5, 1918	16 years, 33 days	Dreamland Rink, San Francisco, California, U.S.	
4	Win	2–1 (1)	Gene Kelly	TKO	3 (4)	Apr 3, 1918	16 years, 31 days	Association Club, San Francisco, California, U.S.	
3	NC	1–1 (1)	Al Hall	NC	1 (4)	Apr 3, 1918	16 years, 31 days	Association Club, San Francisco, California, U.S.	Bout stopped "because neither fighter was trying "
2	Loss	1–1	Tommy Driscoll	PTS	4	Mar 27, 1918	16 years, 24 days	Association Club, San Francisco, California, U.S.	
1	Win	1–0	Johnny Garcia	PTS	4	Mar 20, 1918	16 years, 17 days	Association Club, San Francisco, California, U.S.	
