= Stig Reuterswärd =

Swedish middle-distance runner

Personal information
- Nationality: Swedish
- Born: 17 February 1907 Borås, Sweden
- Died: 5 March 1980 (aged 73) Uppsala, Sweden

Sport
- Sport: Athletics
- Event: Middle-distance running

Stig Reuterswärd (17 February 1907 – 5 March 1980) was a Swedish athlete. He competed in the men's 3000 metres team race event at the 1924 Summer Olympics.
