= Bill Cox (runner) =

American long-distance runner

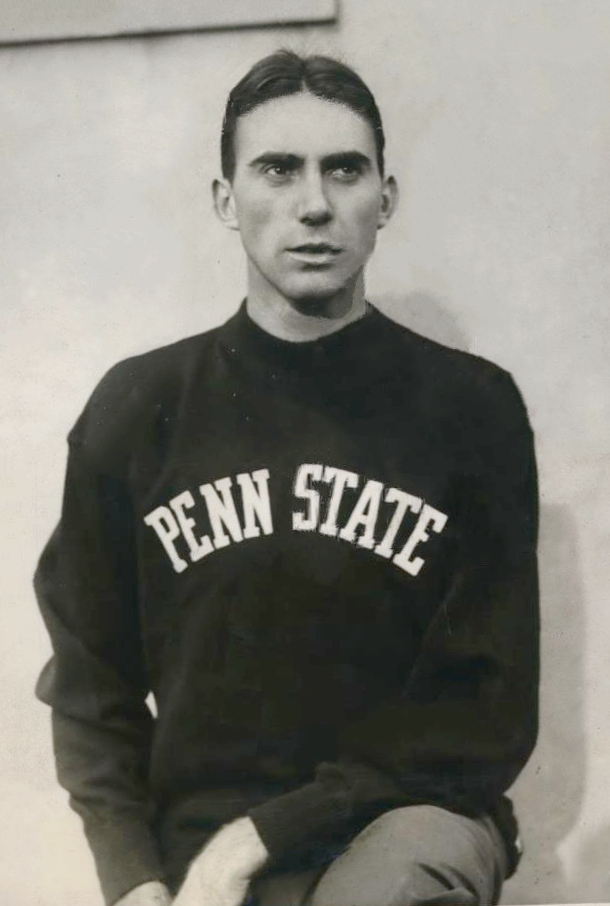
- Cox in 1926

Personal information
- Born: June 12, 1904 in Rochester, New York, U.S.
- Died: June 3, 1996 (aged 91) Webster, New York, U.S.

Sport
- Sport: Athletics
- Events: Mile, 5000 m, 3000 m
- Club: Mercersburg Academy, Lancaster

Achievements and titles
- Personal best: Mile – 4:18.6 (1927)
Medal record
Representing the United States
Bronze medal – third place	1924 Paris	3000 m team

William John 'Spuds' Cox (June 12, 1904 – June 3, 1996) was an American middle-distance runner. Although initially qualifying for the 5,000m team at the 1924 Olympics, he competed in the 3,000m team race. He placed eighth individually, thereby winning a team bronze medal, together with Edward Kirby and Willard Tibbetts.

Cox was educated at the Rochester Shop School, Mercersburg Academy, and Pennsylvania State University. While at Mercersburg he put on several pounds in weight due to his love of potatoes in the school dining room, earning him the nickname 'Spuds'. In later years he returned to Rochester Shop School (then known as Edison Technical School) and taught mathematics for 36 years. Scots American coach Jimmy Curran trained him at Mercersburg.

== See also ==
- List of Pennsylvania State University Olympians
