= Edward Kirby =

American long-distance runner

Olympic medal record

Men's athletics

Representing the United States
Bronze medal – third place	1924 Paris	3000 metre team

Edward Buckler Kirby (October 30, 1901 – July 5, 1968) was an American athlete who competed mainly in the 3000 metre team. He competed for the United States in the 1924 Summer Olympics held in Paris, France, in the 3000 metre team where he won the bronze medal with his teammates William Cox and Willard Tibbetts.

Kirby graduated from Cornell University in 1924 and was a member of the Sphinx Head Society. He was born in Washington, D.C., and died in New York City.
