= Camille Barbaud =

French middle-distance runner

Personal information
- Nationality: French
- Born: 14 July 1900 Gien, France
- Died: 16 December 1996 (aged 96) Montmorency, France

Sport
- Sport: Athletics
- Event: Middle-distance running

Camille Barbaud (14 July 1900 – 16 December 1996) was a French athlete. He competed in the men's 3000 metres team race event at the 1924 Summer Olympics.
