= Nils Andersen =

Norwegian runner

Nils Andersen (21 March 1902 – 7 May 1979) was a Norwegian middle- and long-distance runner.

He was born in Kristiania, and represented the club Tøien TF. He competed in the 3000 metres team race at the 1924 Summer Olympics, along with team mates Haakon Jansen, Johan Badendyck and Hans Gundhus.

At national championships he won two silver medals, in the 1500 metres in 1924 and 5000 metres in 1925. He also collected bronze medals in the 1500 metres in 1922 and 1926.
