= Bertram Macdonald =

British long-distance runner

Personal information
- Nationality: British (English)
- Born: 25 May 1902 Kings Norton, Birmingham, England
- Died: 28 December 1965 (aged 63) Wellesbourne, Warwickshire, England

Sport
- Sport: Athletics
- Event: middle-distance
- Club: Birchfield Harriers
Medal record
Representing Great Britain
Olympic Games
Silver medal – second place	1924 Paris	3000 metre team

Bertram Hector Macdonald (25 May 1902 – 28 December 1965) was a British long-distance runner who competed at the 1924 Summer Olympics.

== Career ==
Macdonald was born in Kings Norton, Birmingham. MacDonald competed for Great Britain in the 1924 Olympics Games held in Paris, France, in the 3000 metre team where he won the silver medal with his teammates Herbert Johnston and George Webber.

The following year Macdonald became the national 1 mile champion after winning the British AAA Championships title at the 1925 AAA Championships.

He died in Wellesbourne in Warwickshire,.
