= Bert Colima =

American boxer

Personal information
- Nickname: Whittier Bearcat
- Born: Ephram Romero; 1902-09-08 Whittier, CA
- Died: October 24, 1979 (aged 77)
- Weight: Middleweight

Boxing career
- Stance: Orthodox

Boxing record
- Total fights: 200
- Wins: 135
- Win by KO: 48
- Losses: 38
- Draws: 21
- No contests: 6

Ephram Romero (1902-1979) was an American professional boxer from Whittier, California from 1919 to 1920. He fought in Mexico and the United States.

== Professional career ==
Bert fought Frank Barrieau to a draw in California. A rematch in Oakland, California again went to a draw.

In California, he fought Oakland Jimmy Duffy to a draw and also fought Mickey Walker, losing by DQ.

He fought Leo Lomski for the Pacific Coast Middleweight Title in Seattle, Washington. Bert lost by KO.

Bert fought Dave Shade in Los Angeles, California, losing by decision. A rematch in Chicago, Illinois produced another loss, by KO.

Bert fought Tommy White for the Mexican middleweight title in Mexico City, Mexico, winning by decision.

Bert successfully defended his title against Hilario Martinez by winning in Mexico City, Mexico (August 11, 1929).

His next fight came against Joe Dundee for the Mexican welterweight title in Mexico City, Mexico. He lost by decision.

Bert fought for the Mexican heavyweight title against Firpo Segura in Mexico City, Mexico and lost by decision.
