= Arthur Clark (athlete) =

British middle-distance runner

Personal information
- Nationality: British
- Born: 8 September 1900 Birchmoor, England
- Died: 25 April 1979 (aged 78)

Sport
- Sport: Athletics
- Event: Middle-distance running

Arthur Clark (8 September 1900 – 25 April 1979) was a British athlete. He competed in the men's 3000 metres team race event at the 1924 Summer Olympics.
