= Haakon Jansen =

Norwegian long-distance runner

Haakon Jansen (24 May 1900 – 6 November 1968) was a Norwegian long-distance runner.

He was born in Kristiania, and represented the club IK Tjalve. He competed in the 3000 metres team race at the 1924 Summer Olympics, along with team mates Nils Andersen, Johan Badendyck and Hans Gundhus. He had modest success on the domestic level, only collecting a single national silver medal from the 5000 metres in 1923.
