= Hans Gundhus =

Norwegian athlete

Hans Gundhus (13 September 1900 – 1 July 1968) was a Norwegian middle and long-distance runner.

He was born in Hønefoss, and represented the clubs IF Liv and later IF Ørnulf. He competed in the 3000 metres team race at the 1924 Summer Olympics, along with teammates Nils Andersen, Johan Badendyck and Haakon Jansen.

He became Norwegian 5000 metres champion in 1924, and won a bronze in 1925 and silver in 1926. He also won two national bronze medals in the 1500 metres, in 1924 and 1925. In June 1924 he captured the Norwegian 3000 metres record from Alf Halstvedt. He ran in 8:44.9 minutes at Bislett stadion. Five days later he improved it additionally to 8:44.8 minutes, again at Bislett. The record stood until 1929 when it was broken by Reidar Jørgensen.
