= Sameli Tala =

Finnish distance runner

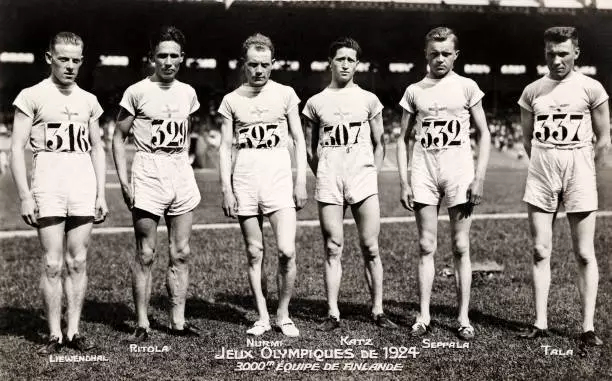

Personal information
- Nationality: Finnish
- Born: 16 August 1893 Jalasjärvi
- Died: 6 January 1961 (aged 67)

Sport
- Sport: Athletics

Sameli Tala (16 August 1893 – 6 January 1961) was a Finnish track and field athlete. He was born in Jalasjärvi. He competed in the 3000 metres team race at the 1924 Summer Olympics, where the Finnish team won gold medals.
