= Johan Badendyck =

Norwegian long-distance runner (1902–1973)

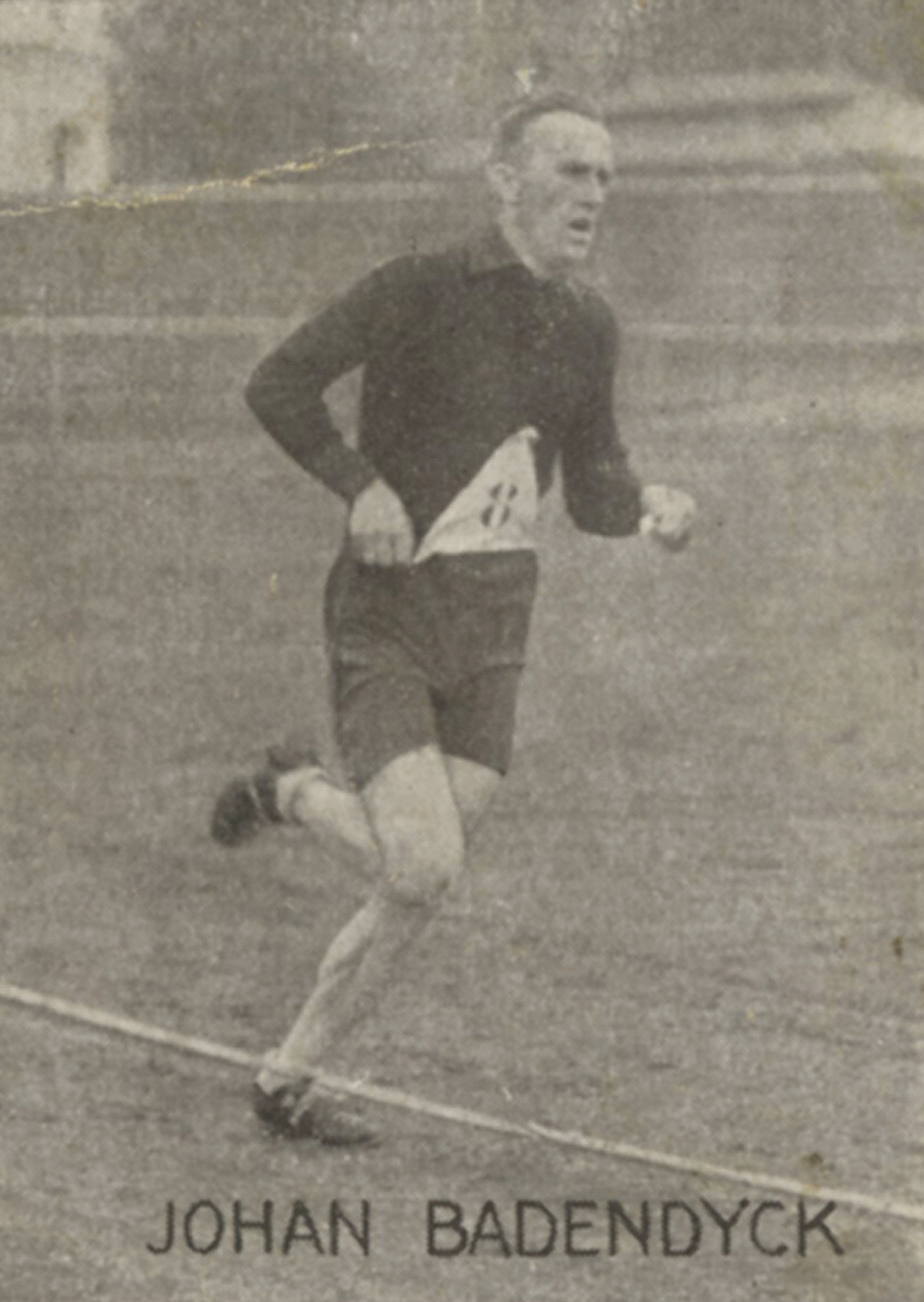
Badendyck, c. 1930

Johan Badendyck (28 March 1902 – 19 April 1973) was a Norwegian long-distance runner.

== Biography ==
He was born on 28 March 1902, in Kristiania, and represented the club IL i BUL. He competed in the 3000 metres team race at the 1924 Summer Olympics, along with teammates Haakon Jansen, Nils Andersen and Hans Gundhus.

He became Norwegian champion in the 10,000 metres in 1926 and 1932, also collecting silver in 1927 and bronze in 1924 and 1929. He also became cross-country champion in 1927 and 1930 with a silver in 1923. In the 5000 metres his best result was bronze in 1926, 1927 and 1932.

In August 1927, he broke the Norwegian 10,000 metres record. Running in 31:41.7 minutes at Østerbro stadion, he overcame Alf Halstvedt's old record by fourteen seconds. He lost the record in 1933 to Georg Braathe. Badendyck's record for the hour run was much more lasting. Having run 17.789 metres in one hour in Stockholm in 1926, the record was not beaten until 1953 when Jacob Kjersem ran 18.093 metres. During the race in Stockholm, Badendyck also posted a record time in the 20,000 metres, but it was not sanctioned. One additional Norwegian record was set with his clubmates in BUL, that in the 4 x 1500 metres relay. In 1926, at Bislett stadion the team beat Grane's old record with a 17:22.5 minute posting. This was greatly improved by Oslo IL the next year.
