= Jack Hood =

British boxer (1902–1992)

Personal information
- Nickname: "Gentleman" Jack
- Nationality: British
- Born: 17 December 1902 Birmingham, England
- Died: 1 July 1992 (aged 89)
- Weight: Welterweight, middleweight

Boxing career

Boxing record
- Total fights: 48
- Wins: 35
- Win by KO: 10
- Losses: 6
- Draws: 6
- No contests: 1

Jack Hood (17 December 1902 – 1 July 1992) was a British boxer who was British and European welterweight champion in the 1920s and 1930s.

== Career ==
=== Early years ===
From Birmingham, "Gentleman" Jack Hood made his professional debut in September 1924 with a win over Joe Boswell. Undefeated in his first seven fights, he lost to Edouard Verret on a points decision in September 1925. He fought Verret again in January 1926, this time winning on points over twenty rounds. His next fight was a challenge for Harry Mason's British welterweight title, winning a controversial points decision over 20 rounds and earning a Lonsdale Belt. A rematch two months later ended in the same result. In 1926 he travelled to the United States for a series of fights with the aim of securing a shot at the world title, which included wins over Paul Doyle and Meyer Grace, a draw with Jimmy Jones, and a defeat to Jack Movey.

=== British and Empire middleweight titles ===
An undefeated run back in the UK, including a knock-out win over European middleweight champion Bruno Frattini and a points win over Belgian cruiserweight champion Louis Wustenrad, led to a fight in October 1929 with Len Harvey, with British and Empire middleweight titles and a £4,100 purse at stake; Harvey won, and retained his titles in a rematch in December after the fight was drawn.

=== Welterweight title ===
Hood's welterweight title was removed by the BBBofC in October 1931 after failing to defend the title. Over the next three years Hood fought with mixed success, including defeats to Harry Mason and Len Harvey, and two draws with Dave Shade and a draw with Vince Dundee, but in 1933 he got another shot at the British welterweight title against Stoker George Reynolds after initially turning down the fight as he deemed the £500 purse inadequate; Hood won with a ninth-round knockout to regain the title. This led to a European title fight against Adrien Anneet in May 1933, which Hood won when Anneet was disqualified in the third round for throwing low blows. The fight was subject to an inquiry by the International Boxing Union, which confirmed the result in December.

=== Final boxing years ===
Promoter Ted Salmon unsuccessfully tried to get Hood a fight with Young Corbett for the world welterweight title in 1933, and Hood filed a challenge with the New York State Athletic Commission in January 1934 for a world title fight with Jimmy McLarnin, but he didn't get a chance to challenge for the title. Hood lost to Len "Tiger" Smith in February 1934, the match postponed from January after Hood fell ill with influenza, subsequently announcing his retirement from boxing and relinquishing the British welterweight title, saying "We must all bow to the inevitable, and being no exception I realise that my best boxing days are now past." He returned, however, in October to fight Smith again, this time winning a points decision over 15 rounds, this proving to be his final fight. In an 11-year career he won 35 of 48 fights and in 6 defeats was only stopped once.

Hood's Lonsdale Belt sold at auction in 2011 for £36,000.

== Retirement from boxing ==
Hood went on to run The Bell Inn, a public house, in Tanworth-in-Arden for 36 years.

== Death ==
Jack Hood died on 1 July 1992, aged 89.
