= Frej Liewendahl =

Finnish middle-distance runner

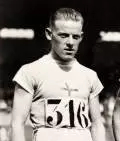
- Liewendahl in 1924

Personal information
- Born: 22 October 1902 Jomala, Åland
- Died: 31 January 1966 (aged 63) Mariehamn, Åland

Sport
- Sport: Athletics
- Club: Turun Urheiluliitto; IFK Mariehamn; HIFK; Pyrkivä Turku; Finnish-American Athletic Club
Medal record
Representing Finland
Men's athletics
Olympic Games
Gold medal – first place	1924 Paris	3000 m team

Frey Fritiof "Frej" Liewendahl (22 October 1902 – 31 January 1966) was a Finnish track and field athlete. Born in Åland, he had first competed for the sports club IFK Mariehamn. He represented Finland at the 1924 Summer Olympics placing eighth in the men's 1500 metres, though was part of the gold medal-winning team in the men's 3000 metres team race.

In 1925, Liewendahl raced mostly in the United States. The following year, he broke the five year winning streak of middle-distance runner Paavo Nurmi in a 1000 metres race. Liewendahl was entered for the 1928 Summer Olympics though he did not compete in his event. He died on 31 January 1966 in Mariehamn.

== Biography ==
Frey Fritiof "Frej" Liewendahl was born on 22 October 1902 in Jomala, Åland, being of Swedish descent. He initially represented the IFK Mariehamn sports club in races.

At the 1924 Summer Olympics in Paris, France, he competed in the men's 1500 metres individually. The preliminaries of the event were held on 9 June; he raced against eight other competitors and placed second in his heat with a time of 4:07.4, thus qualifying him for the finals. The finals of the event were held the next day with twelve competitors. He ran a time of 4:00.3 and placed eighth, citing his poor performance to his suffering of pneumonia while at the games. He was also part of the Finnish relay team for the men's 3000 metres team race that garnered eight points in the final, earning them an Olympic gold medal. He himself did not contribute to the point total of the nation. He is considered to be the first Olympian from Åland.

He later switched clubs to represent Pyrkivä Turku. As part of the club, he had broken two world records with the club's 4 × 1500 metres relay team, In 1925, he mostly competed in the United States as part of the Finnish-American Athletic Club. He had to drop out of the Millrose Games' Wannamaker one and a half-mile (2400 m) in 1925 which was won by Joie Ray. In the same year, Liewendahl broke the five-year winning streak of fellow middle-distance runner and European champion Paavo Nurmi after he defeated Nurmi in a 1000 metres race with a time of 2:31.2 in Väinölänniemi. Sportswriter Sulo Kolkka had opined that Liewendahl felt like he had committed a crime. The morning following the race, Liewendahl went to Nurmi's hotel room with flowers to apologise.

For the lead-up to the 1928 Summer Olympics in Amsterdam, the Netherlands, he worked with the REO Motor Car Company in Finland to distribute cars. At this time, he resided in Mariehamn. He qualified to compete in the men's 800 metres and men's 1500 metres. He eventually did not compete in the event as he retired from sport as a form of protest stemming from his reported refusal to adopt a traditional Finnish surname. In his sporting career, he had also represented HIFK and Turun Urheiluliitto. Liewendahl died on 31 January 1966 at the age of 63 in Mariehamn.
