= Willard Tibbetts =

American long-distance runner (1903–1992)

Olympic medal record

Men's athletics

Representing the United States
Bronze medal – third place	1924 Paris	3000 metre team

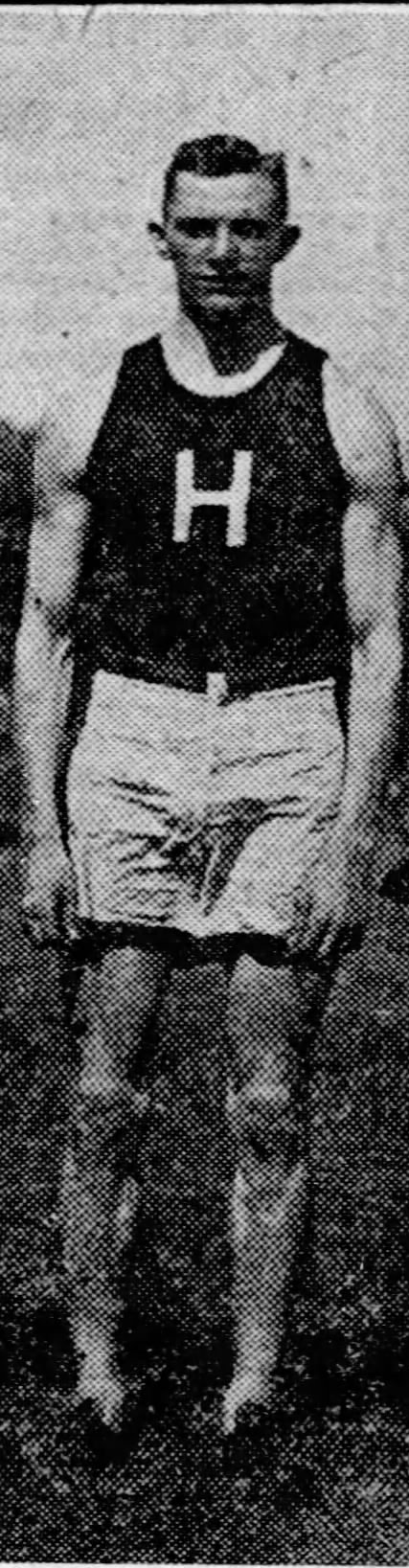
Tibbetts as Harvard track captain-elect in 1925

Willard Lewis Tibbetts Jr. (March 26, 1903 – March 28, 1992) was an American athlete who competed mainly in the 3000 metre team. Tibbetts grew up in Stafford Springs, Connecticut. He graduated from Worcester Academy in 1922 and matriculated to Harvard.

He competed for the United States in the 1924 Summer Olympics held in Paris, France in the 3000 metre team where he won the bronze medal with his teammates Edward Kirby and William Cox.
