= George Webber (athlete) =

British long-distance runner (1894–1950)

Personal information
- Born: 6 December 1894 Shepherd's Bush, London
- Died: 31 May 1950 (aged 55) Luton, England

Sport
- Sport: Athletics
- Event: Middle distance
- Club: Highgate Harriers
Medal record
Men's athletics
Representing Great Britain
Olympic Games
Silver medal – second place	1924 Paris	3000 metre team

George Joseph Webber (6 December 1894 – 31 May 1950) was a British athlete, who competed at the 1924 Summer Olympics.

== Career ==
Webber was born in Shepherd's Bush, London, and was affiliated with Highgate Harriers. He finished third behind Joe Blewitt in the 4 miles event at the 1923 AAA Championships.

At the 1924 Olympic Games held in Paris, France, he competed for Great Britain in the 3000 metre team event, where he won the silver medal with his teammates Bertram Macdonald and Herbert Johnston.
