= Joaquín Miquel =

Spanish athletics competitor

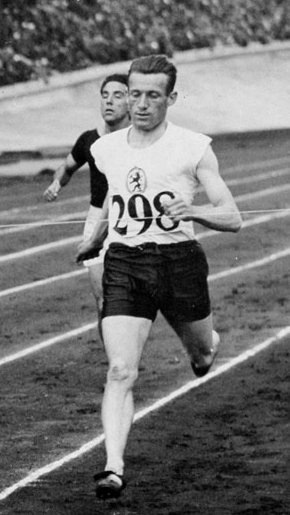
- Miquel (left) at the 1928 Olympics

Personal information
- Born: 21 July 1904 Catalonia, Spain
- Died: 1929 (aged 26)

Sport
- Sport: Athletics
- Event: 400–5000 m
- Club: RCD Espanyol, Barcelona

Achievements and titles
- Personal best(s): 400 m – 49.8 (1928); 800 m – 1:58.4 (1928); 5000 m – 15:41.6 (1924)

Joaquín Miquel Casas (21 July 1904 – 1929) was a Spanish runner. He competed at the 1924 Summer Olympics in the 3000 m and 5000 m and at the 1928 Summer Olympics in the 400 m and 800 m events, but failed to reach the finals.
