= Leo Larrivee =

American middle- and long-distance runner

Medal record

Men's athletics

Representing the United States

Olympic Games
| Bronze medal – third place | 1924 Paris | 3000 metre team |

Leo Edward Larrivee (November 23, 1903, in Fall River, Massachusetts – October 7, 1928, in Chicago, Illinois) was an American track and field athlete. Larrivee won a bronze medal at the 1924 Summer Olympics in Paris. He was a middle-distance runner at the College of the Holy Cross. He died in a traffic collision in 1928.
