= William Seagrove =

British long-distance runner

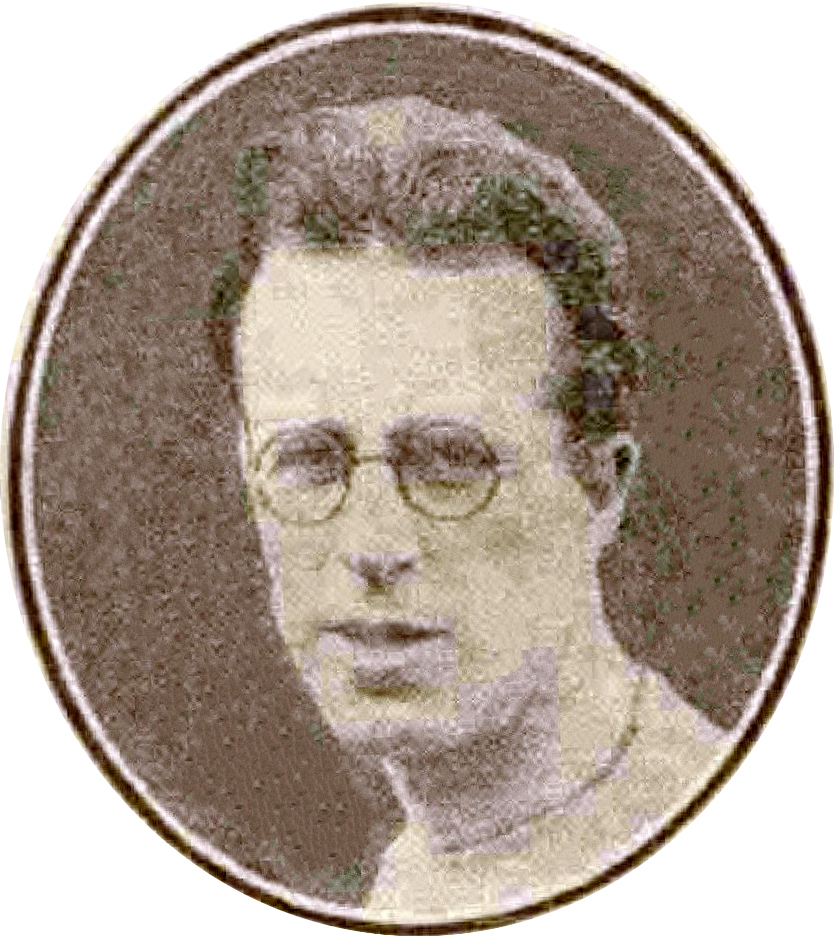
- William Seagrove c. 1926

Personal information
- Nickname: Bonna
- Born: 2 July 1898 London, England
- Died: 5 June 1980 (aged 81) Seaford, East Sussex, England

Sport
- Sport: Athletics
- Event: 800–5000 m
- Club: University of Cambridge AC; Achilles Club

Achievements and titles
- Personal bests: 880 yd – 1:58.0 (1927); Mile – 4:21.2 (1924); 3000 m – 9:00.0e (1920); 5000 m – 15:21.0 (1920)
Medal record
Representing United Kingdom
Olympic Games
Silver medal – second place	1920 Antwerp	3000 m team
Silver medal – second place	1924 Paris	3000 m team

William Raymond Seagrove (2 July 1898 – 5 June 1980) was a British middle-distance runner who competed at two Olympic Games.

== Biography ==
Born in London and educated at Highgate School, Seagrove left in April 1917. After serving in the army during World War I, he matriculated at Clare College, Cambridge in 1919, leaving with a Diploma in Geography three years later. He competed at the 1920 Summer Olympics, winning a silver medal in the 3000 metre team event and finishing sixth in the 5000 metre. Four years later at the 1924 Summer Olympics, he again won a silver medal with the 3000m British team.

Seagrove became the national 1 mile champion after winning the British AAA Championships title at the 1924 AAA Championships.

For a time, he taught at Glenalmond College and in 1926, he founded Normansal preparatory school in Seaford, East Sussex, where he was initially the headmaster and mathematics master. He remained actively involved in the running of the school after his retirement, and the appointment of Rex Hackett to the headship. Seagrove Way, a street in Seaford, is named after him.

Seagrove was an all-rounder in life. An accomplished pianist and violinist, he ran the Normansal School choir, introduced boys to opera, and organised annual visits to the Vienna Boys Choir concerts in Brighton. He was the master of ceremonies and umpire at the annual sports day: eight-year-olds competed in pole vault, long jump, shot, and the usual events. Long-distance running was encouraged.
